= Chronological list of Canadian classical composers =

This is a list of notable Canadian classical music composers ordered by date of birth.

== Baroque ==
- Charles-Amador Martin (1648–1711)

== Classical ==
- Joseph Quesnel (1746–1809)

== Romantic ==
- Stephen Codman (c. 1796–1852)
- James P. Clarke (1807/8–1877)
- Robert Ambrose (1824–1908)
- Jean-Baptiste Labelle (1825–1898)
- Célestin Lavigueur (1831-1885)
- Ernest Gagnon (1834–1915)
- Adélard Joseph Boucher (1835–1912)
- Frantz Jehin-Prume (1839–1899)
- Calixa Lavallée (1842–1891)
- Gustave Gagnon (1842–1930)
- Romain-Octave Pelletier I (1843–1927)
- Joseph-A. Fowler (1845–1917)
- Guillaume Couture (1851–1915)
- J. E. P. Aldous (1853–1934)
- Alexis Contant (1858–1918)
- Alfred De Sève (1858–1927)
- W. O. Forsyth (1859–1937)

== Post romantic/Early modern ==
- Louis-Phillipe Laurendeau (1861–1916)
- Humfrey Anger (1862–1913)
- Charles A.E. Harriss (1862–1929)
- Achille Fortier (1864–1939)
- Clarence Lucas (1866–1947)
- Paul Ambrose (1868–1941)
- Frédéric Pelletier (1870–1944)
- W. H. Hewlett (1873–1940)
- Joseph Allard (1873–1947)
- Romain Pelletier (1875–1953)
- Donald Heins (1878–1949)
- Henri Miro (1879–1950)
- Healey Willan (1880–1968)
- Robert Nathaniel Dett (1882–1943)
- Alfred La Liberté (1882–1952)
- W.H. Anderson (1882–1955)
- Robert Graham Manson (1883–1950)
- J.-J. Gagnier (1885–1949)
- Albertine Morin-Labrecque (1886 or 1890–1957)
- Albert Chamberland (1886–1975)
- Frank Marsales (1886–1975)
- Henri Gagnon (1887–1961)
- Allard de Ridder (1887–1966)
- Rodolphe Mathieu (1890–1962)
- Lydia Boucher (1890–1971)
- Claude Champagne (1891–1965)
- Alexander Chuhaldin (1892–1951)
- René Gagnier (1892–1951)
- Omer Létourneau (1891–1983)
- Léo-Pol Morin (1892–1941)
- Ernest MacMillan (1893–1973)
- Alfred Mignault (1895–1961)
- Joseph Beaulieu (1895–1965)
- Amice Calverley (1896–1959)
- Eugène Lapierre (1899–1970)
- Sophie Carmen Eckhardt-Gramatté (1899–1974)

== Modern/Early postmodern ==
- Colin McPhee (1900–1964)
- Hector Gratton (1900–1970)
- Isabelle Delorme (1900–1991)
- Lionel Daunais (1901–1982)
- Gabriel Cusson (1903–1972)
- Morris Davis (1904–1968)
- Allan McIver (1904–1969)
- Conrad Bernier (1904–1988)
- Charles Houdret (1905–after 1964)
- Bruce Holder (1905–1987)
- Albertine Caron-Legris (1906–1972)
- Murray Adaskin (1906–2002)
- Boris Berlin (1907–2001)
- Lucien Martin (1908–1950)
- Jean Coulthard (1908–2000)
- Jean Deslauriers (1909–1978)
- Walter MacNutt (1910–1996)
- Charles Jones (1910–1997)
- Patricia Blomfield Holt (1910–2003)
- Otto Joachim (1910–2010)
- Keith Bissell (1912–1992)
- Graham George (1912–1993)
- Johana Harris (1912–1995)
- Barbara Pentland (1912–2000)
- Lucio Agostini (1913–1996)
- Violet Archer (1913–2000)
- John Weinzweig (1913–2006)
- Henry Brant (1913–2008)
- Hugh Le Caine (1914–1977)
- Émilien Allard (1915–1977)
- Ricky Hyslop (1915–1998)
- Alexander Brott (1915–2005)
- James Gayfer (1916–1997)
- Jean Papineau-Couture (1916–2000)
- Gaston Allaire (1916–2011)
- Richard Johnston (1917–1997)
- Herbert Belyea (1917–2001)
- Samuel Dolin (1917–2002)
- Robert Farnon (1917–2005)
- Oskar Morawetz (1917–2007)
- Godfrey Ridout (1918–1984)
- Gordon Delamont (1918–1981)
- Lorne Betts (1918–1985)
- Louis Applebaum (1918–2000)
- Gerald Bales (1919–2002)
- Talivaldis Kenins (1919–2008)
- István Anhalt (1919–2020)
- Udo Kasemets (1919–2014)
- Neil Chotem (1920–2008)
- Robert Turner (1920–2012)
- Howard Cable (1920–2016)
- Robert Fleming (1921–1976)
- Kelsey Jones (1922–2004)
- Harry Freedman (1922–2005)
- Jocelyne Binet (1923–1968)
- Kenneth G. Mills (1923–2004)
- Jack Kane (1924–1961)
- Mort Garson (1924–2008)
- Harry Somers (1925–1999)
- Pierre Brabant (1925–2014)
- Gérald Gagnier (1926–1961)
- Victor Bouchard (1926–2011)
- Alan Detweiler (1926–2012)
- Raymond Daveluy (1926–2016)
- François Morel (1926–2018)
- Clermont Pépin (1926–2006)
- Pierre Mercure (1927–1966)
- John Beckwith (born 1927)
- Dolores Claman (1927–2021)
- Carleton Elliott (1928–2003)
- Lloyd Blackman (1928–2014)
- André Mathieu (1929–1968)
- Serge Garant (1929–1986)
- Alfred Kunz (1929–2019)
- Alcides Lanza (born 1929)
- Roger Matton (1929–2004)
- Ron Collier (1930–2003)
- Gustav Ciamaga (1930–2011)
- Hugh Davidson (1930–2014)
- Richard Hunt (1930–2011)
- Ruth Lomon (1930–2017)
- Milton Barnes (1931–2001)
- F. R. C. Clarke (1931–2009)
- Derek Holman (1931–2019)
- Rudolf Komorous (born 1931)
- Glenn Gould (1932–1982)
- Michael Colgrass (1932–2019)
- Boyd McDonald (born 1932)
- Walter Buczynski (born 1933)
- R. Murray Schafer (born 1933)
- Ben McPeek (1934–1981)
- Srul Irving Glick (1934–2002)
- Norma Beecroft (born 1934)
- Jack Behrens (born 1935)
- John Arpin (1936–2007)
- Milan Kymlicka (1936–2008)
- Léon Bernier (1936–2011)
- Malcolm Forsyth (1936–2011)
- Hagood Hardy (1937–1997)
- Ann Southam (1937–2010)
- Michael Conway Baker (born 1937)
- Diana McIntosh (born 1937)
- Jacques Hétu (1938–2010)
- Alain Gagnon (1938–2017)
- Robert Aitken (born 1939)
- Victor Davies (born 1939)
- Bruce Mather (born 1939)
- Marc Bélanger (born 1940)
- John Wyre (1941–2006)
- Brian Cherney (born 1942)
- José Evangelista (1943―2023)
- Larry Lake (1943–2013)
- Anne Lauber (born 1943)
- John Mills-Cockell (born 1943)
- James Montgomery (born 1943)
- John Hawkins (1944–2007)
- John Fodi (1944–2009)
- Bruce Carlson (born 1944)
- Raynald Arseneault (1945–1995)

== Contemporary/Postmodern ==
- Bruce Cockburn (born 1945)
- Yves Daoust (born 1946)
- René Dupéré (born 1946)
- Yves Lapierre (born 1946)
- Michel Longtin (born 1946)
- Nikolai Korndorf (1947–2001)
- Walter Boudreau (born 1947)
- Clifford Ford (born 1947)
- Steven Gellman (born 1947)
- Peter Paul Koprowski (born 1947)
- Gene Martynec (born 1947)
- Claude Vivier (1948–1983)
- Stephen Brown (born 1948)
- Jim Hiscott (born 1948)
- Lubomyr Melnyk (born 1948)
- Marjan Mozetich (born 1948)
- Chan Ka Nin (born 1949)
- David Foster (born 1949)
- Fariborz Lachini (born 1949)
- Alexina Louie (born 1949)
- Denis Bédard (born 1950)
- Christian Calon (born 1950)
- Stephen Chatman (born 1950)
- Michael Matthews (born 1950)
- John Burke (1951–2020)
- Lisle Ellis (born 1951)
- Denis Gougeon (born 1951)
- Peter Allen (born 1952)
- Gilles Bellemare (born 1952)
- Jacques Faubert (born 1952)
- David MacIntyre (born 1952)
- Peter Hannan (born 1953)
- Christos Hatzis (born 1953)
- Scott Irvine (born 1953)
- Robin Minard (born 1953)
- Gary Kulesha (born 1954)
- Denys Bouliane (born 1955)
- Eleanor Joanne Daley (born 1955)
- Jean Derome (born 1955)
- William Beauvais (born 1956)
- Timothy Brady (born 1956)
- Paul Dolden (born 1956)
- Larysa Kuzmenko (born 1956)
- Linda Bouchard (born 1957)
- René Lussier (born 1957)
- Mychael Danna (born 1958)
- Colin Eatock (born 1958)
- Andrew Paul MacDonald (born 1958)
- John Abram (born 1959)
- James Gelfand (born 1959)
- James Keelaghan (born 1959)
- Omar Daniel (born 1960)
- Marc-André Hamelin (born 1961)
- Amin Bhatia (born 1961)
- John Burge (born 1961)
- Andrew Ager (born 1962)
- Ned Bouhalassa (born 1962)
- Arne Eigenfeldt (born 1962)
- Alain Lefèvre (born 1962)
- Leo Marchildon (born 1962)
- Allison Cameron (born 1963)
- Veronika Krausas (born 1963)
- Edwin Orion Brownell (born 1964)
- Benoît Charest (born 1964)
- Jeff Danna (born 1964)
- Brent Lee (born 1964)
- Allan Gilliland (born 1965)
- John Estacio (born 1966)
- Melissa Hui (born 1966)
- David Kristian (born 1967)
- André Éric Létourneau (born 1967)
- Lesley Barber (born 1968)
- Éric Morin (born 1969)
- Jocelyn Morlock (born 1969)
- Desmond Gaspar (born 1970)
- Chris Harman (born 1970)
- Analia Llugdar (born 1972)
- Emily Doolittle (born 1972)
- Airat Ichmouratov (born 1973)
- Derek Charke (born 1974)
- Kati Agócs (born 1975)
- Jimmie LeBlanc (born 1977)
- Andrew Staniland (born 1977)
- Aaron Gervais (born 1980)
- Christopher Mayo (born 1980)
- Vahram Sargsyan (born 1980)
- Samuel Andreyev (born 1981)
- Kyle Bobby Dunn (born 1986)
- Sarah Davachi (born 1987)

== Jazz and other composers (listed alphabetically) ==
- Moe Koffman (1928–2001)
- Phil Nimmons (born 1923)
- Robert Normandeau (born 1955)
- Oscar O'Brien (1892–1958)
- Michael Oesterle (born 1968)
- John Oliver (born 1959)
- Charles O'Neill (1882–1964)
- John Oswald (born 1953)
- Owen Pallett (born 1979)
- Donald Patriquin (born 1938)
- Trevor W. Payne (born 1948)
- Kenneth Peacock (1922–2000)
- Paul Pedersen (born 1935)
- Oscar Peterson (1925–2007)
- Michel Perrault (born 1925)
- Jean Piché (born 1951)
- Dave Pierce (born 1972)
- Randolph Peters (born 1959)
- Benoît Poirier (1882–1965)
- Paul Pratt (1894–1967)
- Albert Pratz (1914–1995)
- André Prévost (1934–2001)
- Harry Puddicombe (1870–1953)
- Donald Quan (born 1962)
- Allan Rae (born 1942)
- Imant Raminsh (born 1943)
- Jan Randall (born 1952)
- Eldon Rathburn (1916–2008)
- Elizabeth Raum (born 1945)
- John Rea (born 1944)
- William Reed (1859–1945)
- Bill Richards (1923–1995)
- Doug Riley (1945–2007)
- André Ristic (born 1972)
- Normand Roger (born 1949)
- Stan Rogers (1949–1983)
- James Rolfe (born 1961)
- Ivan Romanoff (1914–1997)
- Clark Ross (born 1957)
- Myke Roy (born 1950)
- Stéphane Roy (born 1959)
- Welford Russell (c.1901–1975)
- Jeffrey Ryan (born 1962)
- Marc Sabat (born 1965)
- Charles Wugk Sabatier (1819–1862)
- Patrick Saint-Denis (born 1975)
- Micheline Coulombe Saint-Marcoux (1938–1985)
- Herbert Sanders (1878–1938)
- Armando Santiago (born 1932)
- Charles Sauvageau (1807–1849)
- Oliver Schroer (1956–2008)
- Ernest Seitz (1892–1978)
- Paul Shaffer (born 1949)
- Rodney Sharman (born 1958)
- Howard Shore (born 1946)
- Anita Sleeman (1930–2011)
- Linda Catlin Smith (born 1957)
- Leo Smith (1881–1952)
- David Squires (born 1957)
- Paul Steenhuisen (born 1965)
- Ben Steinberg (born 1930)
- Donald Steven (born 1945)
- Fred Stone (1935–1986)
- Timothy Sullivan (born 1954)
- Norman Symonds (1920–1998)
- Boleslaw Szczeniowski (1898–1995)
- Robert Talbot (1893–1954)
- Georges-Émile Tanguay (1893–1964)
- Oscar Ferdinand Telgmann (1855–1946)
- Steve Tittle (born 1935)
- Peter Togni (born 1959)
- Roman Toi (born 1916)
- Jerry Toth (1928–1999)
- Rudy Toth (1925–2009)
- Bramwell Tovey (born 1953)
- Jiří Traxler (born 1912)
- Amédée Tremblay (1876–1949)
- George Tremblay (1911–1982)
- Gilles Tremblay (born 1932)
- Barry Truax (born 1947)
- Ian Tyson (born September 25, 1933)
- Owen Underhill (born 1954)
- Jean Vallerand (1915–1994)
- Stéphane Venne (born 1941)
- Benoît Verdickt (1884–1970)
- Joseph Vézina (1849–1924)
- Albert Viau (1910–2001)
- Michael Vincent (born 1976)
- Augustus Stephen Vogt (1861–1926)
- Calvin Vollrath (born 1960)
- Arnold Walter (1902–1973)
- Ruth Watson Henderson (born 1932)
- Frank Welsman (1873–1952)
- John Welsman (born 1955)
- Hildegard Westerkamp (born 1946)
- Dinuk Wijeratne
- Eric Wild (1910–1989)
- Rick Wilkins (born 1937)
- Charles Wilson (born 1931)
- Scott Wilson (born 1969)
- Édouard Woolley (1916–1991)
- Kathleen Yearwood (born 1958)
- Gayle Young (born 1950)
- Maurice Zbriger (1896–1981)
- Rui Shi Zhuo (born 1956)
- Joel Zimmerman (born 1981)
- León Zuckert (1904–1992)

== See also ==
- Canadian classical music
- List of Canadian composers
