= Joseph Fowler =

Joseph or Joe Fowler may refer to:

- Joseph-A. Fowler (1845–1917), Canadian composer, organist, choirmaster, pianist, and music educator
- Joseph S. Fowler (1820–1902), United States Senator from Tennessee
- Joe Fowler (1894–1993), United States Naval Admiral who had an important part in the building of Walt Disney World
- Boob Fowler (Joseph Chester Fowler, 1900–1988), Major League Baseball shortstop
