= Stéphane Roy =

Stéphane Roy may refer to:

== Ice hockey ==
- Stéphane Roy (ice hockey, born 1967)
- Stéphane Roy (ice hockey, born 1976)

== Others ==
- Stéphane Roy (composer), Canadian composer
- Stéphane E. Roy, Canadian actor and comedian
