= David MacIntyre =

David MacIntyre may refer to:

- David Lowe MacIntyre (1895–1967), Scottish recipient of the Victoria Cross
- David MacIntyre (composer) (born 1952), Canadian composer
