= Godfrey Ridout =

Canadian composer and conductor

Godfrey Ridout (6 May 1918 in Toronto – 24 November 1984 in Toronto) was a Canadian composer, conductor, music educator, and writer.

== Life and career ==
Ridout was a descendant of Thomas Ridout, the first Surveyor General of Upper Canada during the administration of Lieutenant Governor John Graves Simcoe. He attended University of Toronto with John Beckwith. During his time at the Toronto University, he was a pupil of Ettore Mazzoleni (conducting), Weldon Kilburn (piano), and Charles Peaker (organ and counterpoint) at its Conservatory of Music. He then taught on the conservatory faculty from 1940 to 1948. He left there to join the faculty at Toronto University, where he taught until 1982. Among his notable pupils were Walter Babiak, Walter Buczynski, Hugh Davidson, Alan Detweiler, Ben McPeek, Welford Russell, Alfred Strombergs, and Charles Wilson.

He contributed articles to numerous Canadian music publications, notably serving as the assistant editor of both Canadian Music (1940–1941) and Canadian Review of Music and Art (1942–1943). From 1973 to 1984 he was the author of the Toronto Symphony Orchestra's program notes. As a conductor he served as the music director of the Eaton Operatic Society from 1949 to 1958. He was also highly involved with the Toronto Gilbert & Sullivan Society of which he was made an honorary vice-president.

As a composer, Ridout is chiefly remembered for his symphonic and choral works. The Canadian Encyclopedia describes him thus:

"Essentially an eclectic, Ridout yet did not lack for individuality. His music, though intensely felt, is prevailingly sunny and affirmative; it eschews the 'doom and gloom' manner and self-conscious profundity of much 20th-century concert fare. Ridout liked fun in music and could not easily resist concluding a work with a 'good tune'. He saw no need to strive for ever-new styles, or for a progress through styles, or for the role of musical inventor; style for him was a means of communication, not the 'message' itself. In this aloofness from contemporary conformity, Ridout may be perceived to be more original than many innovators and one of the determined communicators of his day."

In 1946, Ridout conducted Two Etudes for String Orchestra, after making alterations suggested by TSO music director Ernest MacMillan. In 1961, he composed one of his notable works, Fall Fair and on March 13, 1974, was in London for the Toronto Symphony Orchestra's first ever concert at the Royal Festival Hall and the UK premiere of his Two Etudes for String Orchestra. This was Ridout's first visit to England and arguably the peak of his career. His Etudes were followed by a young Radu Lupu playing Schumann's Piano Concerto.

== Selected works ==
Opera

- The Lost Child, Opera in 3 acts for television (1976); libretto by John Reid

Orchestral

- Festal Overture (1939)
- Two Etudes for string orchestra (1946)
- Music for a Young Prince (1959)
- Fall Fair (1961)
- La Prima Ballerina: Overture (1967)
- La Prima Ballerina: Suite No.1 (1967)
- La Prima Ballerina: Suite No.2 (1967)
- Frivolités Canadiennes (1973)
- Jubilee (1973)
- George III His Lament, Variations on a Well-known Tune (1975)
- Kids' Stuff (1978)
- No Mean City: Scenes from Childhood (1983)

Band

- Partita accademica (1969)
- Tafelmusik (1976)

Concertante

- Ballade for viola and string orchestra (1938)
- Concerto Grosso for violin, piano and string orchestra (1974)
- Ballade II for viola and string orchestra (1980)
- Concerto Grosso No.2 for solo brass quintet and orchestra (1980)

Chamber music

- Movement for string quartet, Op.4 (1949)
- Introduction and Allegro for violin, cello, and wind quintet (1968)
- A Birthday Fantasy for flute, clarinet and bassoon (1982)
- Fanfare for brass and percussion (1984)

Organ

- Three Preludes on Scottish Tunes (1959)
- Prelude for Organ for Four Sonnets (1968)
- March (1969)
- Two Hymn Tune Improvisations (1977)

Piano

- Junior Boogie (1957)
- Prelude in F (1958)
- Presto from Ontario Variations, 4 Variations on a theme by Jack Behrens (1979)

Vocal

- Cantiones Mysticae for voice and piano or orchestra (1953); words by John Donne
- The Ascension, Cantiones Mysticae No.2 for soprano, trumpet and string orchestra (1962)
- In Memoriam Anne Frank for soprano or tenor and orchestra (1965); words by Bruce Attridge
- Folk Songs of Eastern Canada for voice and piano or chamber orchestra (1967)
- The Seasons, Song Cycle for tenor and piano quintet (1980); words from Poetical Sketches by William Blake
- Exile, Melodrama for female narrator and 9 instruments (1984); text from Roughing It in the Bush by Susanna Moodie
- Two Songs for soprano and oboe; words by T. S. Eliot

Choral

- Come Rejoicing for mixed chorus and organ (1952)
- Esther, Choral Ballad in 5 parts for baritone, soprano, mixed chorus and orchestra (1952)
- Ave Maria for women's chorus (1954)
- We'll Rant and We'll Roar: The Ryans and the Pittmans for mixed chorus (1958); words by W. H. Le Messurier
- The Shepherd's Watch, Christmas Chorus for soprano and mixed chorus (1959)
- The Dance for mixed chorus and orchestra (1960); text from Carmina Burana
- J'entends le moulin for mixed chorus and piano (1960)
- Pange lingua for mixed chorus and orchestra (1960); Latin words by St. Thomas Aquinas
- Sainte Marguerite for mixed chorus and piano (1960)
- Two Christmas Carols for soprano and women's chorus (1960)
- Four Sonnets for mixed chorus and orchestra (1964); words by J. E. Ward
- A General Invitation to Praise God for mixed chorus and organ (1964); words by George Wither
- When Age and Youth Unite for mixed chorus and orchestra (1966); words by Claude Bissell
- The Christmas Story for narrator, chorus and orchestra (1967)
- J'ai cueilli' la belle rose for unison children's chorus and piano (or orchestra) (1967)
- I'll Give My Love an Apple for unison children's chorus and piano (or orchestra) (1967)
- She's Like the Swallow for unison children's chorus and piano (or orchestra) (1967)
- The Domage of the Wise, 3 Partsongs for mixed chorus (1968)
- The Dream of the Rood, Cantiones Mysticae No.3 for baritone or tenor, mixed chorus, orchestra and organ (1972)
- Spirit Is Flesh This Night for mixed chorus (1976); words by John Reid
- The Faithless Nelly Gray, Pathetic Ballad for soprano, children's chorus and piano (1979); words by Thomas Hood
- Holy Is the True Light for mixed chorus and organ (1980); words by Jeremias Gotthelf and Sarum Diurnal
- Whence Is This Fragrance?, Old French Tune for women's chorus

== See also ==
- Canadian classical music
- List of Canadian composers
- Chronological list of Canadian classical composers
