= Richard Gibson (composer) =

- Born: December 13, 1953 (age 71); Charlottetown, Prince Edward Island, Canada
- Genres: Classical
- Occupation(s): composer, educator

Richard Gibson (born December 13, 1953) is a Canadian composer of contemporary classical music, and Professor of Composition at the Université de Moncton in New Brunswick.

He is an Associate Composer of the Canadian Music Centre, and a member of the Canadian League of Composers.

Gibson has also been active as a producer for classical recordings. One of these – the New Brunswick Youth Orchestra's Forbidden City Tour CD – won an East Coast Music Award (ECMA) in 2008 for Classical Recording of the Year.

== Education ==
- B.Mus., Dalhousie University (Steve Tittle, composition)
- M.Mus., University of Western Ontario (Peter Paul Koprowski, composition)
- PhD, King's College London (David Lumsdaine, composition)

== Awards ==
- 1983 – First Prize, Society of Composers, Authors and Music Publishers of Canada (SOCAN) competition for young composers
- 1992 – New Brunswick Award for Excellence in Arts

== Compositions ==
=== Solo works ===
- Nightingales for Katy (flute) 1982
- Cantilena (guitar) 1984
- Sonate (saxophone) 1984
- Resonances (percussion) 1985
- Sept Miniatures (guitar) 1986
- Hemispheres (bass guitar) 1987
- Prélude, Fugue et Allegro Vivace (piano) 1987
- 25 Préludes (piano) 1996
- Cora (percussion) 2000
- Lepidoptera (piano) 2002
- You gotta move (trumpet) 2002
- Julia – Variaciones sobre un tema de Juan Lennon (guitar) 2013

=== Chamber works ===
- Les Îles (12 brass) 1976
- Oboe Piece (oboe, piano) 1976
- Free Flight I (trumpet, fixed media) 1977
- What? Not Another Dance! (3 percussion) 1977
- Oboe Metamorphosis (oboe, fixed media) 1978
- Capriccio (flute, 4 percussion) 1979
- Pattern Music (bass guitar, 2 synthesizers) 1980
- Jazz Poems (5 jazz players, live electronics) 1981
- Free Flight II (trumpet, double bass, percussion) 1983
- Passacaille (violin, piano) 1988
- Changing Perspectives (string quartet) 1990
- The Mindfulness of Breathing (4 tubas) 1990
- Conversation Piece (flute, oboe, bass clarinet, trumpet, piano) 1991
- Neuf Cartes Postales de Cornwall (violin, viola) 1992
- Les Cloches de Kastelli (4 percussion) 1994
- Montañas del Fuego (clarinet, percussion) 1995
- Seven Pieces (bass clarinet, piano) 1995
- Le Barachois (violin, cello, piano) 1996
- Canzona (11 brass) 1997
- Éloges pour Han-Shen (4 percussion) 1998
- April Remembered (violin, double bass) 1999
- Mouvement Polyphonique (3 trombones, piano) 2001
- Guitar Quartet (4 guitars) 2002

=== Vocal works ===
- Glistenin' Whistle (mixed chorus, flute, French horn, 2 trumpets, trombone, tuba, guitar, violin, bass guitar, percussion) 1976
- Parfums Exotiques (soprano, flute, cello, piano) 1976
- Beatus Vir (mixed chorus) 1987
- Hidden Rivers (soprano, piano) 1987
- The Gravity of Earth (speaker, synthesizers, percussion, string orchestra, live electronics) 1988
- Nisi Dominus (soloists, 4 choruses, orchestra) 1989
- Remembering a Woman's Voice (soprano, cello) 1990
- White Pearls (baritone, clarinet, French horn, cello, percussion) 1991
- Cinq Poèmes de Raymond Guy Leblanc (soprano, lute, 4 percussion, string quartet) 1993
- Transfigured Autumn (mixed chorus, small orchestra) 1993
- For Daniel (tenor, piano) 1995
- Trois Chants Klingons (soprano, 4 flutes, synthesizer, 2 percussion, live electronics) 1995
- Poème du Mois de Juillet (soloists, speaker, mixed chorus, 9 percussion) 1999

=== Works for large ensemble ===
- Synchrony (symphonic band) 1978
- Concerto (trombone, orchestra) 1982
- Mantras (youth orchestra) 1987
- Musique Solennelle (small orchestra) 1987
- November Music (14 strings) 1990
- Étude Chromatique (symphonic band) 1994
- Sinfonietta (symphonic band) 1994
- Symphony (orchestra) 1994
- A Festive Overture (orchestra) 2000
- Neo-Baroque Suite (youth string orchestra) 2002

== Discography ==
- Et + Ke 2 – Amerythme (Atlantica Musique 02002) – 1994 (contains Les Cloches de Kastelli for 4 percussion)
- Canadian Music for Clarinet – James Mark, clarinet – 1999 (contains Montañas Del Fuego for clarinet and percussion)
- Nightingales for Katy – Karin Aurell, flute – 2005 (contains Nightingales for Katy for flute)
- Piano Atlantica – Barbara Pritchard, piano (Centrediscs CMC CD 15210) – 2010 (contains Variation and excerpts from 25 Préludes)
- Richard Boulanger joue Richard Gibson – musique pour piano seul – 2015 (contains Le 24 décembre 2004, Lepidoptera, 24 Notes, 25 Préludes (excerpts), Prélude, Fugue et Allegro Vivace, and Sarabande)
