= David Mills (bass) =

Canadian singer, poet. composer, actor (1926–2020)

David Hume Mills (29 January 1926 – 30 November 2020) was a Canadian bass singer, poet, composer and actor. He had an active international singing career that spanned more than five decades. He has published two books of poetry, Isobelle, a Novel in Verse (Toronto 1989) and The Social Comedy (Ottawa 1990). He wrote a one-man show, David Mills – His Poetry and Songs, which premiered in Toronto in 1989 and then toured to numerous Canadian cities in the early 1990s. As a composer he has written a cantata, Vision of Peace to texts from the Book of Isaiah, and several art songs to the poetry of Pauline Johnson and Robert Browning. As an actor, he has appeared on CBC TV and in films for Circle Films and Atlantis Films among other production companies.

Mills was born in Moose Jaw, Saskatchewan on 29 January 1926. As a singer Mills had been chiefly active as a recitalist from the 1940s through the 1990s, usually accompanied by his wife, the pianist Marjorie Mutter. He toured numerous times throughout Europe (1960, 1961, 1965, 1970, 1977, 1979, 1983, and 1988) in addition to making numerous appearances in North America, including 8 nationwide tours of Canada. He performed programs of Canadian art songs, and notably premiered works by such Canadian composers as James Gayfer, Welford Russell, Boleslaw Szczeniowski, and León Zuckert. The latter two composers notably set Mills' own poems to music. In a 1987 review, music critic Pauline Durichen described his voice as "displaying vibrant deep-range control... and at times a soulful sweetness at heights where few basses dare linger".

Mills also occasionally performed in oratorios and operas. In 1953 he sang in his first professional oratorio performance with the Yorkminster Choir under the baton of his former teacher, D'Alton McLaughlin. In 1954 he performed the bass solos in Ludwig van Beethoven's rarely heard 1814 cantata Der glorreiche Augenblick with conductor Emil Gartner and the Toronto Jewish Folk Choir. On the opera stage he performed with the Canadian National Opera in Toronto in 1953, the Opéra de Marseille in 1957–1958, and at a summer festival of light opera in Chicago in 1958.

Mills studied voice at the University of Regina (UR) with Alicia Birkett from 1947 to 1949, during which time he performed on the Canadian radio stations CKRM and CKCK-FM and was heavily involved with the music programs at a number of churches. He also wrote the libretto for The Rebel, an operetta which was performed by students at the UR. He then pursued further studies at The Royal Conservatory of Music where he was a pupil of George Lambert and McLaughlin.

David Mills died on 30 November 2020, at the age of 94.
