= Canadian Review of Music and Art =

Canadian magazine

- Cover of volume 1, number 3 (April 1942)
- First issue: February 1942; 83 years ago
- Final issue: 1951
- Company: Canadian Review Publishing
- Country: Canada
- Based in: Toronto
- Language: English
- ISSN: 0383-0772

The Canadian Review of Music and Art was a Canadian magazine that was published between February 1942 and 1951 by Canadian Review Publishing. The magazine was based in Toronto, Ontario and covered a variety of topics on the arts, from music to painting to sculpture to dance and craft works. Each issue featured several individual Canadian artists and musicians in addition to profiling Canadian arts organizations.

Christopher Wood served as the journal's chief editor for the magazine's duration. L. de B. Corriveau took over as Managing Editor in December 1942. Composer Godfrey Ridout notably served as assistant editor in 1942–1943.

Like many publications during World War II, the magazine was published irregularly due to material shortages, labour difficulties, and other war related problems. Ultimately rising prices and continued problems with material shortages after the war forced the publication to cease in 1951.
