= Carleton Elliott =

Canadian musician and music educator

- Born: 15 March 1928; Welland, Ontario
- Died: 24 August 2003 (aged 75) Fredericton, New Brunswick
- Occupations: Canadian composer, music theorist, choir conductor and music educator.

Carleton Weir Elliott (15 March 1928, Welland, Ontario – 24 August 2003, Fredericton, New Brunswick) was a Canadian composer, music theorist, choir conductor and music educator.

== Early life and education ==
Elliott was the son of Weir and Gertrude (née Chrysler) Elliott. He studied at Mount Allison University where he graduated with a Bachelor of Music in 1951. He earned a Master of Music from California's University of Redlands in 1959, and did further studies in theory and choral conducting at Indiana University.

== Career ==
Elliott joined the faculty of Mount Allison University in 1951, and taught there until 1993. He co-founded the Mount Allison Conservatory Chorale in 1953 and served as its director until 1993. He also served as a music examiner and adjudicator, becoming the Mount Allison Local Centre Examinations in Music supervisor in 1967, and adjudicating at many music festivals in eastern Canada. As an examiner, he "dispelled [students'] fears and nervousness by his gentleness and his genuine interest in them as people as well as musicians." Among his compositions were many choral works and piano pieces for young learners.

== Works ==
- String Quartet No.1 in C Minor (1951) ms.
- Piano Sonata
- Toccata for Piano (1961)
- Suite for Flute and B♭ Clarinet
- Sonatina in one movement for Clarinet and Piano
- 17 Canons for Piano (Waterloo Music)

== See also ==
- Music of Canada
- Canadian classical music
- List of Canadian musicians
- List of Canadian composers
