= Humfrey Anger =

- Born: Joseph Humfrey Anger; 3 June 1862; Ashbury, Oxfordshire, England
- Died: 11 June 1913 (aged 51) Toronto, Ontario, Canada
- Occupations: Organist, pianist, conductor, composer, and music educator
- Instruments: Piano, pipe organ
- Years active: 1890–1913

Joseph Humfrey Anger (3 June 1862 – 11 June 1913) was a Canadian organist, pianist, conductor, composer, and music educator of English birth. His compositional output consists mainly of church music and works for solo piano and organ. Some of his more well known works are A Concert Overture for organ (1895), the patriotic song Hail Canada (1911), and Tintamarre, Morceau de Salon (1911), all of which were published by Whaley, Royce & Co. The latter piece was notably the first published classical composition to thoroughly integrate true tone clusters. He also wrote the textbooks Form in Music and A Treatise on Harmony, both of which were widely used in music schools in North America.

== Life and career ==
Born at Ashbury in Berkshire (now Oxfordshire), Anger studied at New College, Oxford where he earned a Bachelor of Music. He began his career as a school teacher and a church organist-choirmaster in his native country. He was notably the conductor of the Ludlow Choral and Orchestral Society for several years. In 1897 his cantata A Song of Thanksgiving was awarded the Jubilee Prize by the Bath Philharmonic Society. In 1890 his madrigal Bonnie Belle won the London Madrigal Society Prize.

In 1893 Anger emigrated to Canada when he was appointed to the music faculty of the Toronto Conservatory of Music where he was made head of the music theory department. He also worked as an examiner for the University of Trinity College for many years. In 1894 he was appointed organist-choirmaster at the Church of the Ascension, leaving there in 1896 to assume a similar position at Old St Andrew's Presbyterian Church. He left St Andrew's in 1902 when he became organist-choirmaster at Central Methodist Church.

From 1896 to 1898 Anger served as the conductor of the Toronto Philharmonic. He was appointed president of the Canadian Society of Musicians in 1895 and was for several years the dean of the Ontario chapter of the American Guild of Organists. He died 11 June 1913 in Toronto eight days after his 51st birthday.

== See also ==
- Music of Canada
- Canadian classical music
- List of Canadian composers
- List of Canadian musicians
