= Margaret Drynan =

Canadian musician and writer

- Born: Margaret Isobel Brown; December 10, 1915; Toronto, Canada
- Died: February 18, 1999 (aged 83); Oshawa, Canada
- Occupations: Composer, musician, writer
- Era: 20th century

Margaret Isobel Drynan (December 10, 1915 – February 18, 1999) was a Canadian composer, musician, writer and educator.

She was born Margaret Isobel Brown in Toronto. She received a BMus from the University of Toronto in 1943. She studied with Arthur Benjamin, Madeline Bone, Michael Head, E. Kelvin James, James Campbell McInnes, Molly Slater and Healey Willan. She was a long-time member of the choir at the Church of St. Mary Magdalene in Toronto, also singing with the Tudor Singers and the Toronto Bach Choir. She was choirmaster and organist for Holy Trinity Church in Oshawa. From 1960 to 1969, she was music supervisor for the Oshawa elementary school board and, from 1969 to 1981, was music consultant for the Durham District School Board. From 1983 to 1990. she was choirmaster and organist for St. Matthew's Anglican Church in Oshawa.

Drynan was a founding member of the Oshawa District Council for the Arts, serving as president from 1973 to 1975. She helped found the Oshawa Arts Centre. She was named a director of the Oshawa Symphony Association in 1960 and also served as its chairperson. She was also a member of the percussion section for the Oshawa Symphony Orchestra.

Her compositions include:

- The Canada Goose: a musical play in three acts
- a Missa brevis
- The Fate of Gilbert Gim
- a number of carols and songs, including Why Do the Bells of Christmas Ring? and Songs for Judith
- four operettas

She became an associate of The Royal Conservatory of Music in 1975 and was a founding member and honorary fellow of the Royal Canadian College of Organists, serving as its national president from 1982 to 1984.

She was Canadian editor for Diapason. She also contributed to various music periodicals including Toronto's Music Magazine.

Drynan died in Oshawa at the age of 83.
