= Célestin Lavigueur =

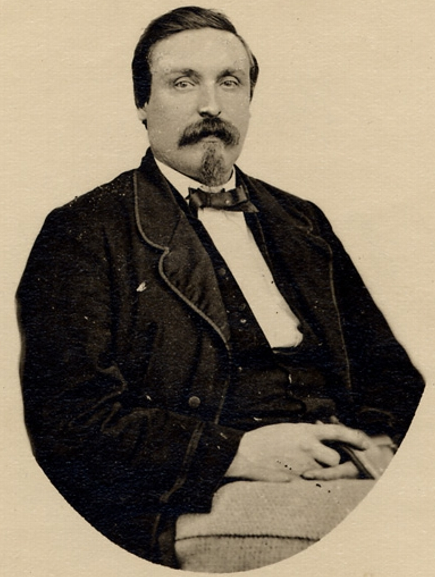

Background information
- Born: Jean-Célestin Lavigueur; 19 January 1831; Quebec City, Lower Canada
- Died: 11 December 1885 (aged 54) Lowell, Massachusetts

Célestin Lavigueur (19 January 1831 – 11 December 1885) was a French Canadian musician and composer.

== Early life and education ==
Lavigueur was born in Quebec City, Lower Canada. He attended the Petit Séminaire de Québec, but left to devote his time to musical pursuits. He studied violin with an amateur musician, François Huot. He learned to play several more instruments with little formal training.

== Career ==
Lavigueur taught piano, violin, and wind instruments at the Petit Séminaire de Québec from 1853 to 1881.

Lavigueur was a composer and a concert artist. He composed three operas: "La fiancée des bois", "Un mariage improvisé", and "Les enfants du manoir". With poet Pierre-Gabriel Huot, he composed a song for the Huron people, "La Huronne, Romance for voice and piano" in about 1861.

In 1880 Lavigueur's patriotic song, "O Canada, beau pays, ma patrie" was published.

In 1881, he moved to Lowell, Massachusetts to be with one of his sons. He participated in the local music scene there, presenting a play with musical accompaniment. He died in 1885 in Lowell.

== Personal life ==
Lavigueur's mother, Marguerite, was the daughter of General Sir Howard Douglas, 3rd Bt, Governor of New Brunswick. He married Mary Childs of Quebec in 1863. The couple had four children, including violinist Émile Lavignueur, and Henri-Edgar Lavigueur, a politician.
