= Ramona Luengen =

Ramona Luengen (born December 29, 1960) is a Canadian composer, choir conductor and educator who has received international attention for her compositions.

She was born in Vancouver and received a BMus and MMus from the University of British Columbia and a DMus in composition from the University of Toronto. Luengen studied composition with Cortland Hultberg, Derek Holman and Harry Freedman and piano with Jane Coop.

Her choral compositions have been performed in North America, Europe, Australia, New Zealand and Japan. Performances of her works have been broadcast on the CBC, the BBC, DR in Denmark, Deutschlandradio in Germany, NRK in Norway, Magyar Rádió in Hungary, Radio Nacional de España in Spain and Sveriges Radio in Sweden. Her Stabat Mater was chosen as Outstanding Choral Composition of the Year and Outstanding Choral Event of the Year by the Canadian Association of Choral Conductors in 1996. In 2006, she received the Herbert Drost Award from the British Columbia Choral Federation.

She has also composed Naomi's Road, an opera for young audiences based on Joy Kogawa's youth novel, and a piano concerto which was performed on CBC radio.

Luengen was artistic director for the Phoenix Chamber Choir for seventeen years. She also was conductor for the Shaughnessy Heights United Church choir in Vancouver and the Amabilis Singers of New Westminster.

She has lectured on theory, choir, composition and contemporary music at the University of British Columbia and Simon Fraser University.
