= Eric Genuis =

Canadian composer and pianist

- Born: March 13, 1967 (age 59); Toronto, Canada
- Education: Royal Conservatory of Music, Canada; Berklee College of Music, Boston
- Occupations: Composer, musician
- Years active: 1992–present
- Known for: Concerts for Hope
- Website: www.ericgenuis.com

Eric Genuis is a Canadian composer and musician who lives in Louisville, Kentucky, U.S.

He is noted for his Concerts for Hope. He performs his original compositions more than a hundred times a year.

Genuis was born in Toronto, Canada on March 13, 1967. He earned a degree in piano performance from the Royal Conservatory of Music in Canada. He also studied to become a math and physics teacher.

He is known for playing in prisons, hospitals, rehab centres, nursing homes and inner-city schools. He started playing in prisons when he was invited to a maximum security prison. He feels music brings humanity and beauty to places lacking in these virtues.

He has performed across the world in countries including the United States, Australia, Austria, Canada, France, Germany, Peru, Poland and Slovakia.

In February 2019 Genuis began his second tour of Australia playing in Corrimal, New South Wales and Windang, New South Wales.

== Discography ==
Albums

- Last in Line (1993)
- No Greater Love (1995)
- Truth Never Changes (1996)
- Eternity (1997)
- Never Alone (1999)
- Fantasias for Violin and Piano (2003)
- Legacy (2006)
- The Winds Have Changed (2006)
- Timeless (2009)
- Redemption (2020)
