= Michael Vincent (music journalist) =

Canadian composer (born 1976)

- Born: 1976 (age 49–50)
- Education: Concordia University, Simon Fraser University, University of Toronto
- Occupations: Journalist, media executive, composer
- Years active: 2004 onward
- Employer: Ludwig Van Museland Media Inc. Toronto Star ZoomerMedia
- Website: michaelvincent.ca

Michael Vincent (born 1976) is a music journalist, media executive, and composer, who splits his time between Toronto, Ontario and Moncton, New Brunswick.

Since 2014, he has been publisher and editor-in-chief of Ludwig Van (formally Musical Toronto), and CEO of Museland Media Inc. He was a freelance music critic for the Toronto Star, and also a composer of works which combine electronic and traditional instrumentation, as well as his work with spoken word, which includes a full-length opera Generation X with text by the Canadian Author Douglas Coupland.

His company, Museland Media (Ludwig Van) was acquired by ZoomerMedia for $1.1 Million in June 2023. Headed by Canadian media mogul Moses Znaimer, Ludwig Van joins other ZoomerMedia properties, which include BlogTO, Daily Hive, The Peak, and Curiosity.

Michael Vincent has written and edited for Ludwig Van, The Toronto Star, La Scena musicale, Norman Lebrecht and was a contributing author for the book, Playing With Words: the spoken word in artistic practice, a collection of responses from over 40 leading contemporary composers and artists who have been invited to represent aspects of their creative practice with words, and in particular, the spoken word, for the printed page. Michael has studied with composers Osvaldo Golijov, Tim Brady, Gary Kulesha, Jean Claude Risset, Roberto Sierra, David MacIntyre, Barry Truax, Christos Hatzis, and James Rolfe. He has studied music at Victoria Conservatory of Music, McGill University, and holds advanced degrees from Concordia University (Montreal, Quebec), and Simon Fraser University (Vancouver, British Columbia).

Vincent graduated with a Doctorate in Musical Arts in composition and theory at the University of Toronto Faculty of Music and is a member of the Canadian Music Centre.

He has served as an official judge for the Juno Awards, the Polaris Music Prize, and Classical:NEXT.

== Bio ==
In 2002, his piece Essence was recorded on the CEC labels DISContact! III compilation album. Under direction of Tim Brady, Bradyworks ensemble premiered his Un-What? at Oscar Peterson Concert Hall. In March 2003, and Bozzini String Quartet premiered his Three Ring Circus in April 2004, and during that same year, Terra Firma was premiered by the Wire Ensemble under The New Modes group.

Between November 2003 and February 2004, Michael has premiered three electroacoustic works Sat There and Clapped, Advaita, and Three Stories for the Faint of Heart at the ÉuCue Concert Series at Oscar Peterson concert hall in Montreal, Quebec. In late 2003, he won the Allan award for his work in mixed electroacoustic and instrumental forms, and has written articles and reviews for eContact! Electroacoutic music journal, and la Scene Musicale classical music magazine. For the past 6 years, Michael has been on staff at la Scene Musicale, acting as new editor, and news contributor.

Michael has collaborated choreographer Jennifer Mascall and videographer Jacqueline Levitin on a feature work for the Off Centre Dance Company entitled Just Barely, which premiered at SFU Burnaby Theatre on April 8 and 9, 2005. Michael has also worked with plunderphonics composer, John Oswald on a concert inspired by Glenn Gould for the Vancouver New Forms festival, which saw the premiere of his work Gouldberg Variations on September 15, 2005. He has joined forces with the Vancouver spoken word artists Barbara Adler on two unique pieces entitled Baby 81 and Little Museum. Little Museum has since been recorded on the spoken word CD Flusterblush released in July 2006.

Over the years 2005 and 2006, Michael wrote and adapted a feature-length spoken-word opera entitled Generation X- the Opera, which was based on a novel by Canadian author Douglas Coupland. Generation X- the Opera, premiered on March 17, 2006, at the SFU Burnaby Theatre, in Burnaby BC.

In February 2007, Michael premiered three speech melody compositions titled Warnings from Punk Rock 101, West-Coast Cats, and Dying Ain't Bad Y'all at the Western Front in Vancouver BC, for the PuSh International Performing Arts Festival.

Michael also contributed as one of four composers in a multi-interdisciplinary work entitled Triaspora, performed at the Chan Centre for the Performing Arts on September 21–22, 2007 by Juno Award nominated performers Orchid Ensemble and Moving Dragon Dance, with multimedia by Aleksa Dulic and Kenneth Newby. Most recently, the production was shown at the National Arts Centre (NAC) in Ottawa Canada as part of BC Scene

In the spring of 2010, Michael premiered a newly commissioned work (Tombeau for an Ancient Chinese General) for dance at the Royal Ontario Museum (ROM) as part of the International CanAsian Dance Festival, which was performed by Moving Dragon Dance and the TorQ Percussion Quartet.

== Awards ==
- 2011 Karen Kieser Prize in Canadian Music - Honourable Mention" - University of Toronto
- 2008-2012 Full-Tuition Fellowship" - University of Toronto
- 2010 Project Award" - Ontario Arts Council
- 2006 Graduating Project Grant" - Simon Fraser University
- 2006 Arts Service Award" - Simon Fraser University
- 2004 Graduate Fellowship" - Simon Fraser University
- 2003 Alain Award in Electroacoustic Composition" - Concordia University

== Compositions ==
=== Film score ===
- "In the End" (2012, independent feature film)

=== Stage ===
- Koong (2010, 15'42")
- Triaspora: Overture (2007, 9'30")
- Generation X - The Opera (2006, 51')
- Just Barely (2005, 11'11")

=== Orchestra ===
- Throwing a Line (2008, 12'00")

=== Chamber ===
- Quel Bon Hiver (2011, 10'36")
- How They Come Singing (2011, 4'50")
- What Times Is It There? (2010, 8'54")
- Tombeau for an Ancient Warrior (2010, 15'42")
- Jack (2008, 5'30")
- Mothertongue (2008, 9'30")
- West Coast Cats (2006, 9'37")
- The Brevity of the Appellation (2005, 10'3")
- Until You Are Satisfied (2005, 10'3")
- Le Cirque de Calder (2004, 11'51")
- Warnings from Punk Rock 101 (2003, 8'34")
- Last of the Gallant Heroes (2003, 4'08")
- Un-What (2003, 4'40")
- Music to Rise to (2002, 3'36")
- Four Set Mutations (2002, 15'20")

=== Solo ===
- A Mobile of Gulls (2011, 4'40")
- Gawkey Music (2011, 7'46")
- Max and the Life of Big Machines (2010–11, 16'18")
- The Girl w/ X's for Eyes (2010, 4'40")
- The Busy Life (2010, 6'06")
- Haunting Lomax (2010, 10'06")
- Flesh Colour (2008, 14'12")
- The Filth and the Fury (2007, 7'11")
- Dying Ain't Bad Y'all (2006, 3'38")

=== Electroacoustic ===
- Little Museum (2006, 5'25")
- Baby 81 (2005, 5'15")
- Gouldberg Variations (2005, 11'11")
- Terra Firma (2004, 15’)
- Three Stories for the Faint of Heart (2004, 15 minutes)
- Advaita (2003, 8'26")
- Sat There and Clapped (featuring Kevin Austin) (2003, 6'08")
- Essence (2002, 2'50")

=== Interdisciplinary ===
- Sleepwalk (2005)
