= Gayle Young =

Canadian composer and author (born 1950)

Gayle Young (born 22 Mar 1950) is a Canadian composer and author. Young is an adherent of microtonality who has invented a number of musical instruments and notational systems.

== Early life and education ==
Young was born in St Catharines, Ontario. She graduated from York University with a Bachelor of Fine Arts in 1977.

== Career ==
Young began writing for Musicworks magazine in 1978, becoming its managing editor in 1987.

In 1980 Young designed a 24-stringed musical instrument, the amaranth, which she played in many of her performances and later released an album of music performed on it.

Young lectured about the musical creations of Canadian physicist, composer, and instrument builder Hugh Le Caine at the McGill Contemporary Music Festival in 1985, and in 1989 she published a book about him.

In 2012 Young's recorded soundscape, "Avalon Shorelines", was part of a New York concert by cellist Madeleine Shapiro. She continued to act as editor of the magazine MusicWorks.

In 2016 Young performed with her amaranth as part of a deep listening concert in Ottawa organized by composer and accordionist Pauline Oliveros.
