= Charles A. E. Harriss =

British-Canadian composer and conductor

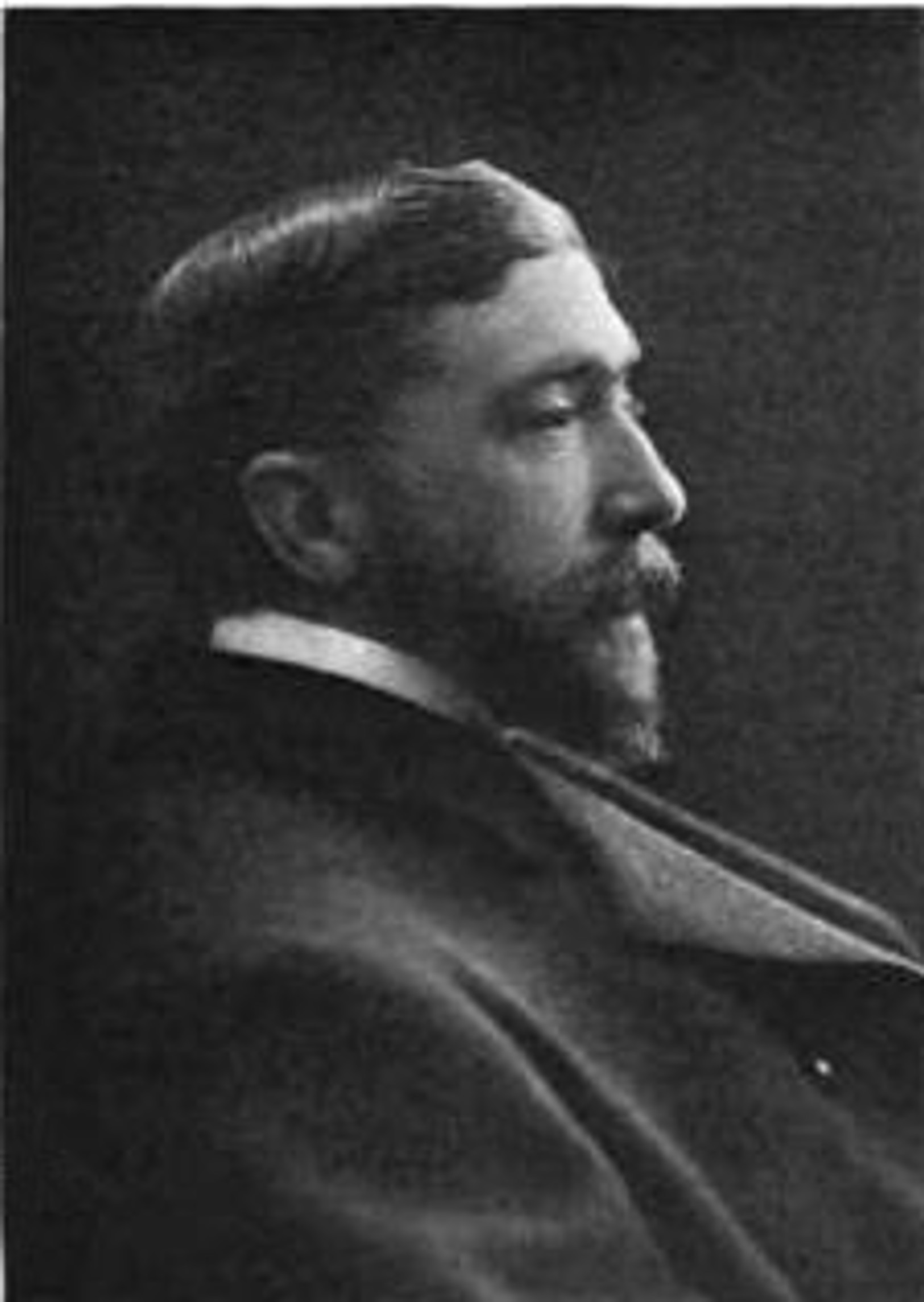
Charles Harriss, 1903

Charles Albert Edward Harriss (16 or 17 December 1862 – 31 July 1929) was a British-Canadian composer, impresario, educator, organist-choirmaster and conductor.

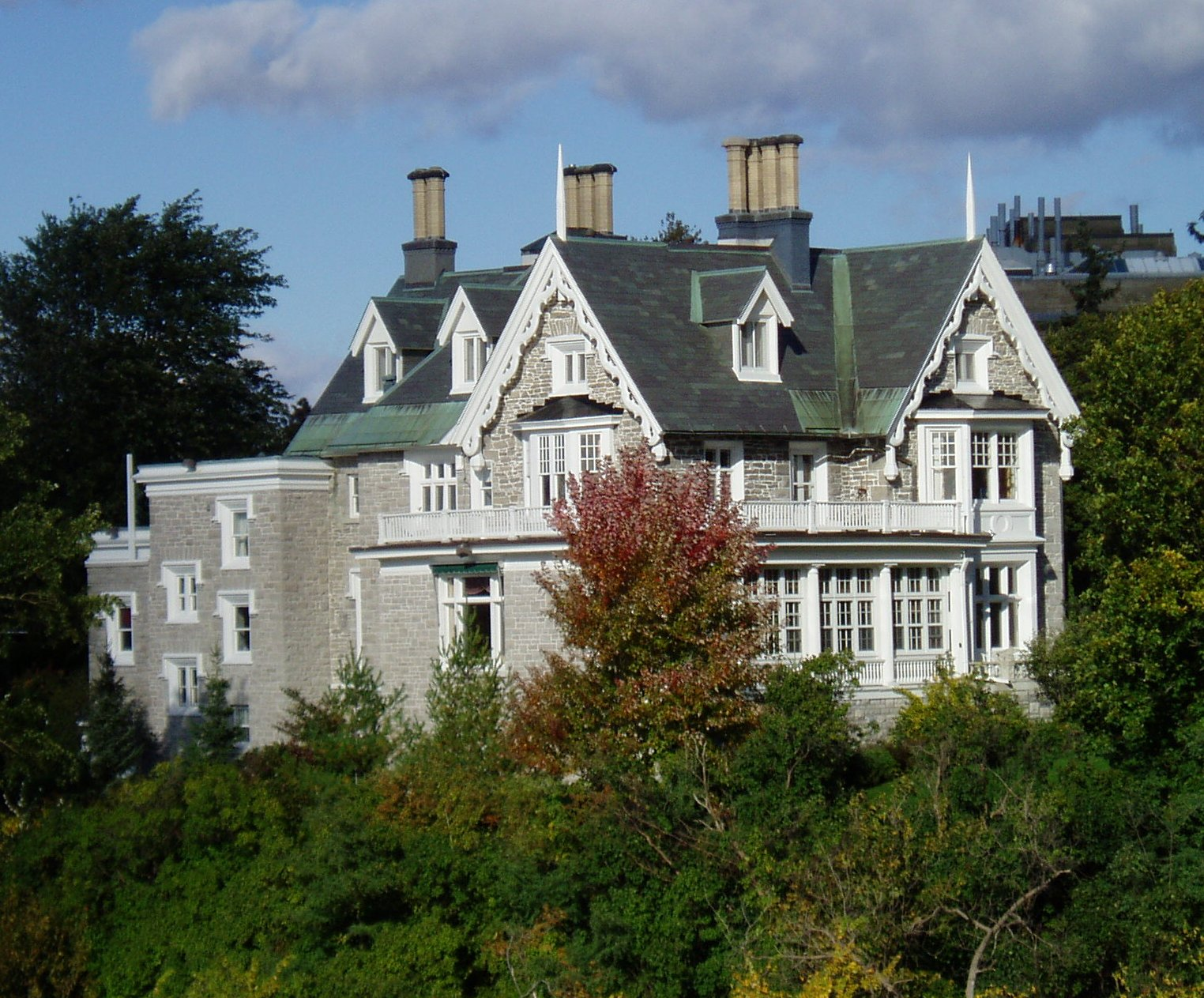
Earnscliffe Residence in Ottawa, Ontario

== Early life and education ==
Harriss was born in London, England, around midnight between 16 and 17 December 1862. He was the son of Edwin Harriss, organist and choir conductor. He studied at St. Michael's College, Tenbury, with Sir Frederick Ouseley. Upon graduation, his first job was that of choir master at St. John's church in Wrexham, Wales.

== Career ==
At the age of 18 Harriss was appointed organist in a church in Welshpool, Wales. Through his teacher Ouseley's connections in Canada, and after a direct petition from Agnes Macdonald, wife of the Prime Minister of Canada, Sir John Macdonald, Harriss was invited to audition for the job of organist at St. Alban the Martyr in Ottawa, Canada. After moving there in 1882, he became the organist at Christ Church Cathedral in Montreal (1883–1886). In 1886 Harriss succeeded his own father as organist in St. James the Apostle church, also in Montreal.

Harriss composed a number of hymns and other choral works. His most famous composition is his opera Torquil, conceived firstly in 1896 as a piano-vocal score subtitled "a Scandinavian dramatic legend", on a text by Edward Oxenford. Even though structurally operatic, the composer warned in the score that it "may be sung by choral societies but must be given without custome or action". Torquil was premiered on 22 May 1900 at Massey Hall, Toronto, by the Boston Festival Orchestra with Harriss conducting.

In 1894 Harriss became the founding director of the McGill Conservatorium of Music (today the Schulich School of Music), supervising 26 music instructors. He continued to compose religious music, including masses and cantatas.

Harris organized a series of music festivals throughout Canada. In 1910 he published several patriotic works. He was also in charge or bringing the shining stars of the day to his newly adopted country, such as English baritone Charles Santley in 1891 and soprano Emma Albani in 1896.

== Personal ==
In 1897, Harriss married Ella Beatty-Shoenberger, daughter of John Beatty, M.D., Professor of Sciences in Victoria University, Cobourg, Ontario, and Eleanor Armstrong. She was the widow of the American industrialist George K. Shoenberger, who left her a considerable fortune. In 1900 the couple bought Lady Macdonald's Ottawa house, Earnscliffe.

According to Nadia Turbide in the Dictionary of Canadian Biography, Harriss was a staunch British imperialist who sought to bring British cultural "standards" to the crown's dominions abroad.

Charles A. E. Harriss is sometimes confused with his namesake and fellow composer, Charles Lewis Matthew Harris (1863–1925). Besides the similarity between their first and last names, the confusion is sparked by the fact that the latter was also an organist and choir master, also born in England (Staningly, Yorkshire) and who later (as a child) moved to Canada, eventually becoming the founder and first director of Hamilton Conservatory.

== Death and legacy ==
Harriss died in 1929. His papers are on file at the National Library of Canada.

== Selected works ==
- Daniel before the King, dramatic cantata, 1884
- Torquil, lyric opera, 1894
- Festival Mass, 1901
- Coronation Mass for Edward VII, 1903
- Pan, choric idyll, 1904
- The Sands of Dee, ballad, 1904
- The Crowning of the King, ode, 1911
- The Admiral, comic opera, 1902
- Canadian Fantasie, 1904
