= William Beauvais =

Canadian classical guitarist and composer

William Eugene Beauvais (born October 9, 1956) is a Canadian classical guitarist and composer who has performed in the United States, Europe, and across Canada.

== Early life ==
Beauvais completed a Bachelor of Music in Music Performance at the University of Toronto. Shortly after graduation he won first prize both at the Canadian Music Competition and in the Carrefour Mondial de Guitare in Martinque.

== Career ==
Beauvais is best known for his work as a teacher at York University, The Royal Conservatory of Music, Queen's University and the University of Windsor, and for his recordings, most notably, his 1991 recording of The Bulgarian Dances on the [Musica Viva 1071].

In over three decades, Beauvais has accumulated many diverse performing and recording credits. The artists he has worked with include: Brian Katz, The Evergreen Club, Arraymusic, New Music Concerts, Alan Hetherington, The Canadian Chamber Ensemble and Les Amis Concerts. He has also worked with choreographers Terrill Maguire and Hedy Minton, as well as poets Steven McCabe, Richard Truhlar and Wayne Keon. He has given many premier performances, including works George Crumb, Elliott Carter, Jon Siddall, Stephen Wingfield, Ronald Bruce Smith and Chris Harman.

More recently Beauvais has devoted much time to his own creative output writing music for The Montreal Guitar Trio, the Canadian Music Centre, Jeffrey McFadden and the Echo Women's Choir. His music is published by les Productions d'OZ, Mel Bay, Tuscany Publications and Frederick Harris Music.

He is a member of the Canadian Music Centre, and currently teaches at York University.

== Recordings ==
- Memory Palace music of Gerry Berg - 1990
- Dances and Romances for Violin - 1991 with Moshe Hammer and Valerie Tryon
- Bridges with Brian Katz - 1992
- Traces with George Koller and Julian Knight - 1995
- 4/Four music of Michael Hynes - 1997
- Invisible Cities - 2009 with George Koller: bass, Alan Hetherington: percussion, Barry Prophet: percussion, Raffi Altounian: guitar, Michael Kolk: guitar and Rob MacDonald: guitar
- Unspoken Dreams: Stories from Rumi - 2010 with Ariel Balevi: story-teller

== Awards ==
- First prize at the Canadian Music Competition - 1980
- First prize at the World Centre For Guitar in Martinique - 1980
- He has received grants from the Toronto Arts Council, FACTOR and York University and his music has been heard in Switzerland, Denmark, the U.K., Turkey, South Korea, Australia and Argentina, and is published by Les Productions D’OZ.
