= Myke Roy =

Canadian composer and recording engineer (born 1950)

- Born: 2 July 1950 (age 74); Trois-Rivières, Quebec, Canada
- Occupation(s): Composer, recording engineer

Myke Roy (born 2 July 1950) is a Canadian composer and recording engineer. An associate of the Canadian Music Centre and a member of the Canadian Electroacoustic Community, his compositional output includes a substantial amount of electroacoustic music, instrumental music, multi-media works, and music for the theatre. In 1976 he was awarded the Sir Ernest MacMillan Award/Fellowship by the Composers, Authors and Publishers Association of Canada for his works Sveln (piano and synthesizer), Dra-men Dzunkt (8 performers or more) and Tsé Tnant/Te Deum (17 amplified instruments and tape). In 1987 he won the Robert Fleming Prize.

== Education ==
Born in Trois-Rivières, Roy began his musical education at the École supérieure de musique de Nicolet where he studied from 1970 to 1972. He pursued further studies at the Université de Montréal where he earned a Bachelor of Music in 1975, a Master of Music in 1980, and a Doctor of Music in 1989. One of his principal teachers at the UM was Serge Garant.

== Career ==
Roy began his career as a recording engineer in 1972. In 1974-1975 he worked with Alcides Lanza and Mario Bertoncini at McGill University's Electronic Music Studio. He was also employed at the Université de Montréal as a technician from 1974 to 1977. While there he notably worked on the Grand prix du disque de l'Académie Charles-Cros winning LP Games and Songs.

In 1983 Roy joined the faculty of the Université du Québec à Trois-Rivières where he taught courses in acoustics, electroacoustics and aural perception and served as the head of the school's electroacoustic music laboratory through 1986. In 1987 he returned to the Université de Montréal to become coordinator of the electroacoustic department, He served as vice-president of the Canadian Electroacoustic Community from 1987 to 1989.

Roy has also worked as a sound technician for concerts presented by the Association pour la création et la recherche électroacoustiques du Québec and the Société de musique contemporaine du Québec. He has also occasionally contributed articles on electronic music to music publications, including the 1989 article 'Le Statut de professionnel pour le compositeur/diffuseur d'électroacoustique' in GUIDE magazine.
