= Brent Lee =

Brent Lee (born 1964, Wynyard, Saskatchewan) is a Canadian composer and professor of Music Composition at the University of Windsor. Growing up, he studied guitar and saxophone. He received a Bachelor's (1986) and Master's (1990) degree in Music Composition from McGill University in Montreal. Brent showed interest in both computer and electroacoustic music. While still a student, he was awarded several composition prizes through CAPAC and SOCAN, and was one of six young composers to receive a Residency Prize at the Bourges International Electroacoustic Music Festival in 1988.

Following his studies in Montreal, Lee had residencies in the Netherlands, Bourges and at the Banff Centre, before settlingin Calgary in 1990. There, he taught at the Mount Royal College Conservatory, as well as working with New Works Calgary, Strictly Plutonic and Modus Vivendi ensembles. He was named an associate composer of the Canadian Music Centre in 1991.

He completed a doctoral degree in composition at the University of British Columbia, studying composition with Keith Hamel and Steven Chatman. He also studied orchestration with Nikolai Korndorf in Vancouver. Lee accepted a position at the University of Windsor in 2002, after a two-year post-doctoral fellowship at UBC.

While in Windsor, Lee was named the first Composer-in-Residence with the Windsor Symphony Orchestra, a position which he held from, 2003–2006. He has also been heavily involved in the Windsor Canadian Music Festival, which is a celebration of new Canadian music hosted by the Windsor Symphony, and the University of Windsor School of Music.

He started the Noiseborder Ensemble, an experimental new music group, at the University of Windsor.
