= Albertine Morin-Labrecque =

Canadian opera singer (1886–1957)

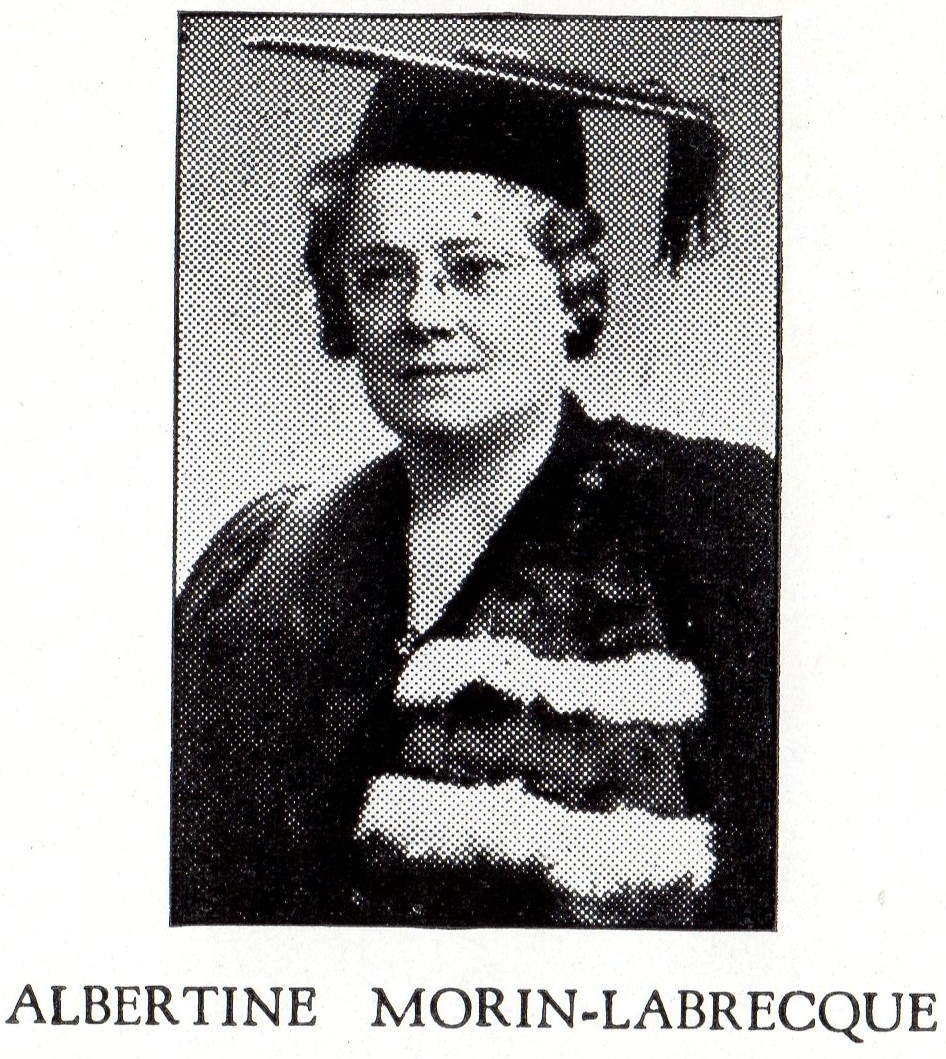

Albertine Morin-Labrecque (sometimes Labrecque-Morin) (8 June 1886 – 22 or 25 September 1957) was a Canadian pianist, soprano, composer, and music educator. Her compositional output includes 4 ballets, 2 comic operas, the Chinese opera Pas-chu, 2 concertos for two pianos, the symphonic poem Le Matin, numerous symphonic works, and compositions for band. Her works have been published by a variety of companies. A square and a street in Montreal were named after her in 1984.

== Early education and career ==
Born Albertine Rosalie Odile Labrecque in Montreal, Morin-Labrecque was a child prodigy and began her musical training at the Académie de musique du Québec (AMQ) at the age of five. She gave her first public piano recitals when she was seven and earned her senior class diploma with honours from the AMQ at age 8. She notably was awarded first prize in music theory in her academy class. She pursued further studies in piano privately with Romain-Octave Pelletier I for a number of years. With him she mastered the standard piano repertoire.

In 1901 Morin-Labrecque began giving regular recitals. During the first two decades of the century she regularly gave recital tours in both Canada and the United States, and actively studied harmony and music composition. She also taught on the faculty of the Conservatoire national de musique.

== Studies in Paris and later career ==
Following the end of World War I, Morin-Labrecque went to Paris to study with J. Macaire (composition) and Arthur Plamondon (singing). She performed in several concerts in Paris and in Brussels as both a pianist in singer, before crossing the Atlantic again in 1920. She stopped in New York City to perform in a few concerts before making her way back to Montreal.

In 1922 Morin-Labrecque established the chamber ensemble Trio de Montréal with her sister, violinist Jeanne Labrecque, and cellist Yvette Lamontagne. From 1922 to 1951 she served on the faculty of the Université de Montréal (UM) where she taught music analysis, pedagogy, piano and voice. She was awarded an honorary doctorate from the UM in 1935. She also continued to teach at the Conservatoire national for part of that time. Her notable students included Gérard Caron and Hector Gratton.

Morin-Labrecque published two books on piano pedagogy, Recueil de modèles et de dictées musicales and Méthode de piano. During the 1940s she published several short essays and monographs on composers like Bach, Beethoven, Chopin, Gounod, Liszt, Massenet, Mozart, Schubert, Verdi, and Wagner among others. Many of her papers and original manuscripts are part of the collection at the Library and Archives Canada. She died in Montreal in 1957.
