= Jimmie LeBlanc =

Canadian composer and guitarist

Jimmie LeBlanc (born 1977) is a Canadian composer specializing in instrumental and mixed music. His music has been performed throughout his native country and internationally, including by the Ensemble Contrechamps, Hwaum Chamber Ensemble, Kore Ensemble, Les Enfants Terribles, Nouvel Ensemble Moderne, Pentaèdre, Quatuor Bozzini, and the Trio Fibonacci, and many soloists.

== Early life and education ==
LeBlanc was born in Saint-Étienne-de-Lauzon, Quebec. His initial musical training was as a pop and jazz guitarist. He then pursued studies in classical guitar and music composition at the Conservatoire de musique du Québec à Montréal. He completed a Doctor of Music degree at the Schulich School of Music at McGill University.

== Career ==
In 2007 LeBlanc was a finalist in the 4th Seoul International Competition for Composers. In 2008 he received the Lutoslawski Award. In 2009 he was awarded the Jules Léger Prize for New Chamber Music for the work L’Espace intérieur du monde. LeBlanc is the author of Luigi Nono et les chemins de l'écoute (L'Harmattan, 2010), and of "Xenakis' Æsthetic Project: the Paradoxes of a Formalist Intuition" (Xenakis Matters, Pendragon Press, 2012), and has contributed two chapters to La création musicale au Québec (PUM, 2014). He is member of the Circuit – musiques contemporaines editorial board, responsible of the cahiers d’analyse section, and regular member of the Observatoire interdisciplinaire de création et de recherche en musique (OICRM). He taught composition at Conservatoire de musique de Montréal from 2016 to 2021, and is currently professor of composition at Université de Montréal.
