= Robert Graham Manson =

British-born musician

Robert Graham Manson (11 June 1883 – 14 February 1950) was a British-born musician.

He was born in London, one of four sons of James Alexander Manson (born 1852), a journalist and author. One of his brothers was James Bolivar Manson (1879–1945), who was an artist and director of the Tate Gallery in London from 1930 to 1938.

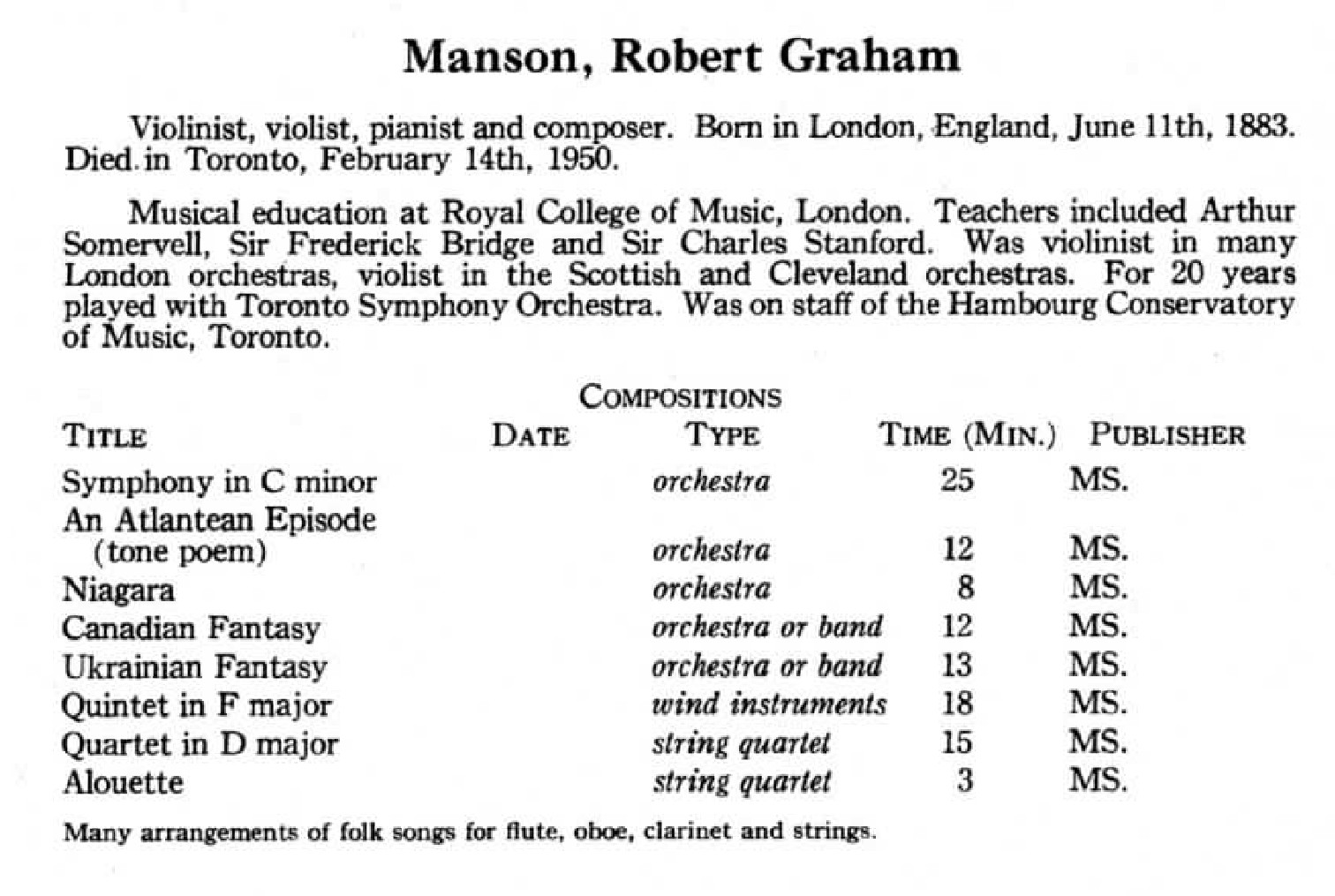
Summary of Manson's compositions from Catalogue of Canadian Composers, (p.164 Pub. 1972 Canadian Broadcasting Corporation)

Manson was a student at the Royal College of Music from January 1900 to December 1903. His tutors included Arthur Somervell, Sir Frederick Bridge and Sir Charles Villiers Stanford. He played the violin, viola and piano. He went on to play in the string sections of the Scottish Orchestra and the London Symphony Orchestra before emigrating to North America. Here he played in the Cleveland Symphony Orchestra (Sokoloff, conductor) for two seasons, the Toronto Symphony Orchestra (Frank Welsman, conductor) for three seasons and then went on to become leader of the second violins in the New Symphony Orchestra of Toronto (Dr Von Kunits, conductor). In 1913 he returned to England and served for four years in the British Expeditionary Force during the Great War, thereafter returning to Canada to continue his work with the Toronto Symphony Orchestra.

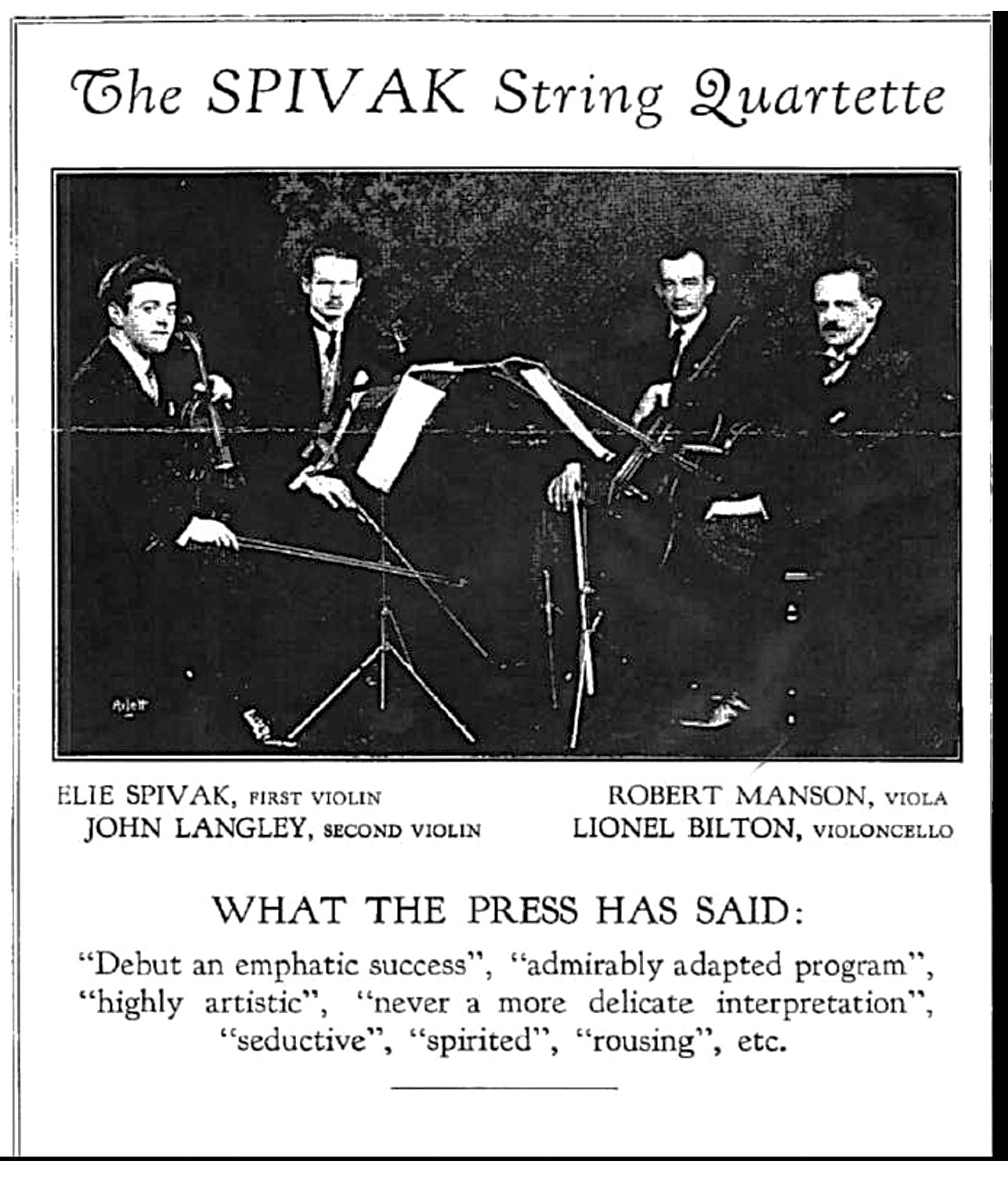
Spivak Quartet publicity brochure, Toronto

In addition, he became a member of the Spivak String Quartet, formed and led by Eli Spivak (1902 - 1960), in which he played the viola.

He was also a composer - his works including the Symphony in G Minor. This was first performed in the County Orange Hall, Toronto (date unknown) by about 50 members of the Toronto Symphony Orchestra under the conductorship of Donald Heins, assistant director of the TSO. His other compositions included An Atlantean Episode (tone poem for orchestra), Niagra (orchestra), Rhapsodie Canadienne (orchestra), Ukrainian Melodies (orchestra), Quintet in F major (wind instruments), Quartet in D major (string quartet) and Alouette (string quartet).

Two of his compositions have been performed by the Toronto Symphony Orchestra. Rhapsodie Canadienne was performed in Massey Hall, Toronto on Tuesday evening, February 12 at 5.15pm, 1929 (Seventh Twilight Concert) in the Seventh Season 1928/29. Ukrainian Melodies was performed in Massey Hall, Toronto, on Tuesday evening, February 15 at 5:15 pm. 1927 (Fifth Season, 1926/27) by the New Symphony Orchestra (pre-TSO).

Manson married Mary L Steward in Bedford, England, in 1921. She died in Toronto in 1940.

Manson died in Toronto on 14 February 1950.
