= Welford Russell =

Canadian composer

Welford Russell (30 October 1900 – 1975) was a Canadian composer based in Toronto, Ontario. He is particularly remembered for his output of choral works.

== Early life and education ==
Russell was born in Neepawa, Manitoba. He graduated from the University of Toronto in 1925. He studied the organ in Ireland and pursued studies in music composition with Godfrey Ridout and singing with Weldon Kilburn at the Toronto Conservatory of Music.

== Career ==
Russell worked as a surgeon and was a medical missionary in India from 1925 to 1941. He left during World War II to serve in a medical corps.

He pursued musical activities in his spare time. He published a Stabat mater and eight individual choral pieces, of which his part-song Who Is at My Window Who? has been widely performed. The song was also recorded by the Festival Singers of Canada. He also produced a number of anthems and motets which remain unpublished. He wrote a number of art songs, two of which, The Conqueror and Farewell to Arms, were premiered by bass David Mills. Lois Marshall recorded several of his songs for CBC/Radio Canada in 1969 (RCI 333/SM 101).

After his death in 1975, his papers were collected at the National Archives in Ottawa.
