= Colin Eatock =

Canadian composer, writer and journalist

Colin Timothy Eatock is a Canadian composer, writer and journalist who lives in Toronto, Ontario.

== Life and career ==
Eatock was born in Hamilton, Ontario, in 1958, and attended the University of Western Ontario, McMaster University, and The University of Toronto, from which he received a PhD in musicology.

Eatock's music has been performed in Canada, the US and Europe. He is an associate member of the Canadian Music Centre, which released a CD of his compositions entitled Colin Eatock: Chamber Music in 2012 on its Centrediscs label. It contains six of his compositions: "Ashes of Soldiers" (2010), "Suite for Piano" (1995), "Tears of Gold" (2000), "Three Songs from Blake's 'America'" (1987), "Three Canzonas for Brass Quartet" (1991), and "The Lotus-Eaters" (2000).

In 2023, Centrediscs released a second CD of Eatock's music, Colin Eatock: Choral and Orchestral Music. It contains a chamber-orchestra arrangement of his "Ashes of Soldiers" (2010-2012) and "Sinfonietta" (1999), also for chamber orchestra, as well as eight of his choral works: "The Lord Is Risen!" (2021), "In the Bleak Mid-Winter" (1998), "Cast Off All Doubtful Care" (2012), "Three Poems by Amy Lowell" (2018), "Three Psalms" (2018), "Benedictus es: Alleluia" (2018), "Two Poems by Walt Whitman" (2017), and "Out of My Deeper Heart" (2015).

As a music journalist and critic, Eatock has written for Toronto's The Globe and Mail newspaper, and also the National Post, The New York Times, the Houston Chronicle, the Kansas City Star, and the San Antonio Express-News, as well as numerous magazines and journals in Canada, the US and the UK.

He has also written three books: the first is on the life of Felix Mendelssohn, the second is a collection of interviews about the pianist Glenn Gould and the third, Music After the Millennium, is a collection of his music journalism.

In 2025, Eatock's board game Schooled was published under an anagrammatic pseudonym by Analog Game Studios of Toronto.

== Published works ==
=== Books ===
- Eatock, Colin, Mendelssohn and Victorian England, Ashgate Press (London, England), 2009
- Eatock, Colin, Remembering Glenn Gould, Penumbra Press (Newcastle, Ontario), 2012
- Eatock, Colin, Music After the Millennium, published independently, 2024

=== Articles ===
- Eatock, Colin. "Classical Music Criticism at the Globe and Mail: 1936–2000." Canadian University Music Review (Canadian University Music Society) 24/2: 8–28.
- Eatock, Colin. "The Crystal Palace Concerts: Canon Formation and the English Musical Renaissance." 19th Century Music (University of California) 34/1: 87–105.
- Eatock, Colin. "Mendelssohn's Conversion to Judaism: An English Perspective." Mendelssohn Perspectives (Ashgate Press) 2012: 63–79.
