= Arne Eigenfeldt =

Canadian composer

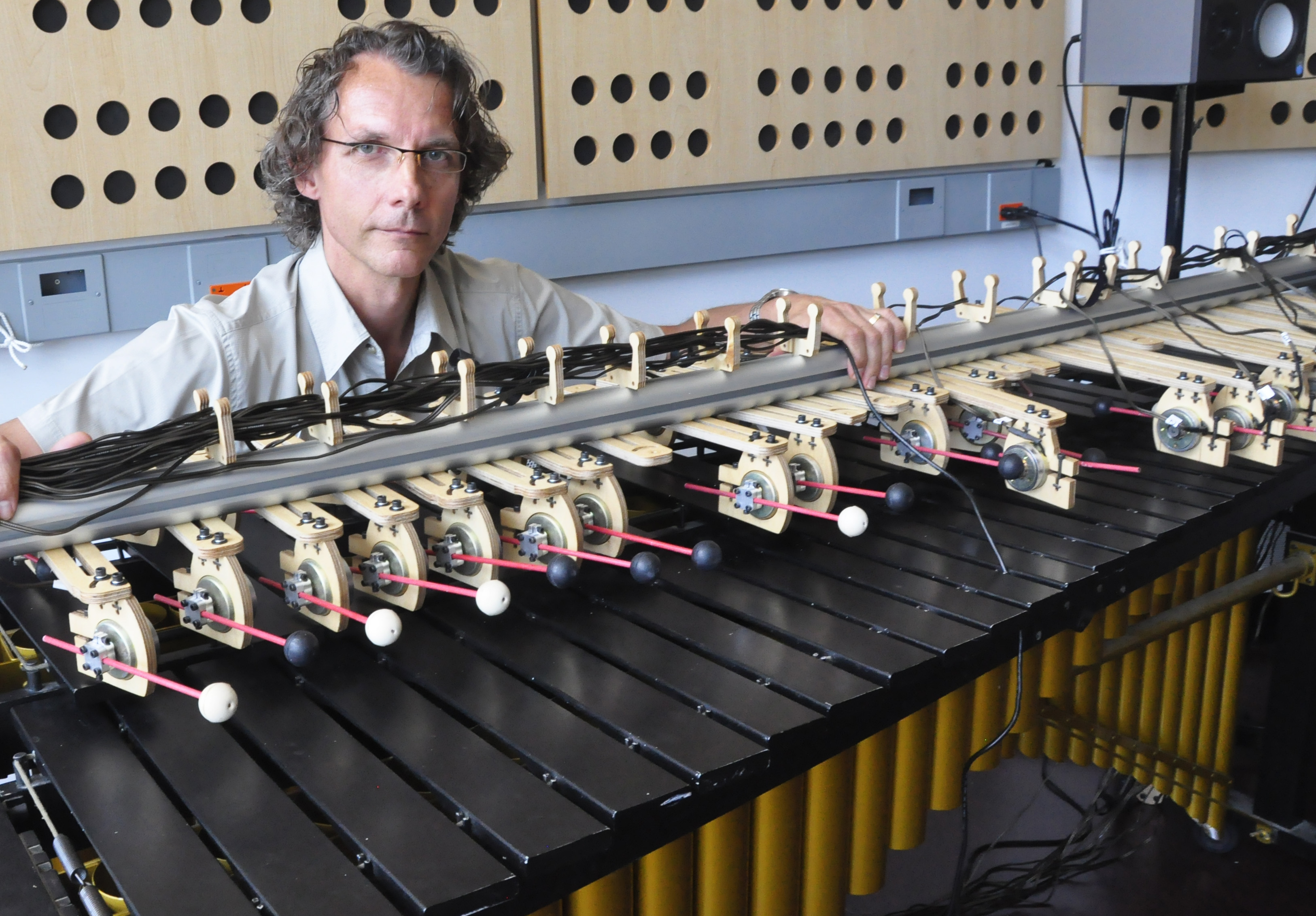
Arne Eigenfeldt

Arne Eigenfeldt (born 1962) is a Canadian composer and creator of interactive and generative music systems based in Vancouver, British Columbia. Both his music and his research into intelligent systems have been presented internationally. He is currently a professor of music at Simon Fraser University. He also produces electronica under the pseudonyms Raemus and loadbang.

Eigenfeldt has composed extensively for contemporary dance, especially in collaboration with choreographer Serge Bennathan. His electroacoustic music is predominantly live, generated or performed in software he has written in Max/MSP. His recent research focusses on encoding knowledge into intelligent performance systems. Eigenfeldt is also known for his goalkeeping skills in the local old-timers league, playing for virtually every team in the Fraser Valley.

== Works and publications ==
- Eigenfeldt, Arne (October 2008), "Intelligent Real-time Composition", eContact! 10.4 — Temps réel, improvisation et interactivité en électroacoustique / Live-electronics — Improvisation — Interactivity in Electroacoustics, Montréal: CEC
- Eigenfeldt, Arne. "Multi-agency and Real-time Composition: In Equilibrio." eContact! 11.4 — Toronto Electroacoustic Symposium 2009 (TES) / Symposium Électroacoustique 2009 de Toronto (December 2009). Montréal: CEC.
- Eigenfeldt, Arne. "In Search of Tools for the Laptop Ensemble." eContact! 13.3 — TES 2010 etc.: Toronto Electroacoustic Symposium 2010 / Symposium Électroacoustique 2010 de Toronto (June 2011). Montréal: CEC.
- Eigenfeldt, Arne (March 2013), "Towards a Generative Electronica: A Progress Report", TES 2011: Toronto Electroacoustic Symposium / Symposium électroacoustique de Toronto, vol. 14, no. 4, Montréal: CEC
