= Léon Bernier =

Canadian musician (1936–2011)

Léon Bernier (6 September 1936, Hull, Quebec (now Gatineau, Quebec) - 11 October 2011, Longueuil) was a Canadian composer, conductor, pianist, arranger, accompanist, and music pedagogue. He composed and arranged music for numerous programs on Canadian radio and television, and also wrote music for a number of theatrical productions in Canada. For CBC Television he served as music director of the programs Les Coqueluches, Allo Boubou, Zoum, and Les Démons du midi, and composed music for the television dramas Edna, Le Vélo devant la porte, Pâques, Le Misanthrope, and Coup de sang among others.

In 1962 Bernier founded Les Diplomates du Québec, an award-winning drum and bugle corps which remains active to this day. He served as pop singer Ginette Reno's music director from 1964 to 1972. His arrangements for Reno's self-titled album was awarded the Grand Prix du Disque in 1968. From 1970 to 1972 he was director of a summer concert series at the Place des Arts in Montreal. As a pianist, he appeared as a soloist with a number of notable Canadian ensembles, including several appearances with both the Quebec Symphony Orchestra and the Montreal Symphony Orchestra.

Bernier was a pupil of pianist Hélène Landry at the Conservatoire de musique du Québec à Québec where he graduated with a premier prix in piano performance in 1954. In 1955 he was awarded the Prix d'Europe which enabled him to study under Renzo Silvestri from 1956 to 1958 at the Accademia Nazionale di Santa Cecilia in Rome. He taught on the music faculties of Laval University, the Université de Montréal, and the Université du Québec.
