= Keith Bissell =

Canadian composer, conductor, and music educator

- Born: 12 February 1912; Meaford, Ontario, Canada
- Died: May 9, 1992 (aged 80)
- Occupations: composer, conductor, and music educator

Keith Warren Bissell (12 February 1912 in Meaford, Ontario – 9 May 1992 in Newmarket, Ontario) was a Canadian composer, conductor, and music educator. He was particularly known for his choral music, which often implemented elements of Canadian folk music. A passionate educator, he was a pupil of Carl Orff and was influential in popularizing the Orff Schulwerk methodology within North America. From 1957 to 1958 he was President of the Ontario Music Educators' Association. He was conductor and artistic director of the National Youth Orchestra of Canada in 1970–1971. He also was vice-president of the Canadian Music Council for several years and president of the Canadian Music Centre from 1975 to 1977.

Bissell began his career as a public school teacher in Toronto from 1934 to 1948. During this time he began his professional music studies at the University of Toronto where he earned a Bachelor of Music in 1942. He was particularly influenced by his professor in music composition, Leo Smith.

In 1948 Bissell was appointed the assistant supervisor of the music program for the Edmonton school district. After just one year he was made supervisor of the program, serving in that capacity for seven years. In 1952 he founded the Edmonton Junior Symphony Orchestra. He also worked as the organist/choirmaster for Christ Church in Edmonton.

Bissell left Edmonton in 1955 to become supervisor of the music program for the Scarborough school district, a position he held into the 1970s. In 1956 he founded the Scarborough Teachers' Chorus, which he conducted up through 1970. In 1960 he went on a sabbatical to study music education methods with Gunild Keetman and Carl Orff in Munich. After these studies he implemented the Orff Schulwerk methodology within the Scarborough school system, using his own compositions and Canadian folk music to help translate the German methodology into an English language context. His success in this area led to his invitation to lecture on the Orff Schulwerk method at many universities and music conservatories throughout North America. From 1960 to 1973, he led the Scarborough Orff Ensemble.

Bissell was a lifelong exponent of Canadian music. In 1963 he and John Adaskin organized the first Canadian composers symposium in music education in Toronto. In 1976 a trust fund was established in his name that annually commissions a choral work to be written for school use by a Canadian composer. He was an associate of the Canadian Music Center and was awarded the Canadian Music Council Medal in 1978.
