= Paul Dolden =

Canadian composer (born 1956)

Paul Dolden (born January 23, 1956, in Ottawa, Canada), is an electroacoustic music composer, currently living in Montréal, Canada.

Paul Dolden began his career at age 16 as a professional electric guitarist, violinist, and cellist. Since age 29 he has won over twenty international awards for his music which is performed in both Europe and North America. His approach to audio technology is to use it as a platform to launch otherwise impossible musical performances, thereby making his computer behave like a virtual orchestra. His compositions are characterised by a maximalist aesthetic in which hundreds of digitally recorded instrumental and vocal performances are combined in multiple layers.

Dolden's early works employed a unified approach to timbral and harmonic variation, but under the influence of postmodernism, his concerns shifted to include the juxtaposition and superimposition of disparate musical styles. His Resonance Cycle of works (1992–96) are an example of this. In his Twilight Cycle Dolden investigated contemporary new music-melody and dance rhythms, genres not normally associated with electroacoustic music.

Dolden's 2-CD set, L'Ivresse de la Vitesse (empreintes DIGITALes) is regarded as a landmark recording and was selected by The Wire magazine as "one of the top 100 recordings of the 20th century."

== List of works ==
- The Melting Voice Through Mazes Running (1984)
- Veils (1984–85)
- In the Natural Doorway I Crouch (1986–87)
- Caught in an Octagon of Unaccustomed Light (1987–88)
- Measured Opalescence (1988), piano, percussion, and tape
- Below the Walls of Jericho (1988–89)
- Dancing on the Walls of Jericho (1990)
- Physics of Seduction. Invocation #1 (1991), electric guitar, and tape
- Physics of Seduction. Invocation #2 (1991), harpsichord, and tape
- Beyond the Walls of Jericho (1991–92)
- Physics of Seduction. Invocation #3 (1992), cello, and tape
- L'ivresse de la vitesse (1992–93)
- In a Bed Where the Moon Was Sweating. Resonance #1 (1993), clarinet, and tape
- Revenge of the Repressed. Resonance #2 (1993), soprano sax, and tape
- The Gravity of Silence. Resonance #5 (1995), flute, and tape
- The Heart Tears itself Apart with the Power of its own Muscle. Resonance #3 (1995), 4 violins, 2 violas, 2 cellos, 2 doublebasses, and tape
- Gravity's Stillness. Resonance #6 (1996), violin (or viola), and tape
- The Vertigo of Ritualized Frenzy. Resonance #4 (1996), reed instrument and/or piano (or accordion), and tape
- The Frenzy of Banging on a Can (1997), piano, bass clarinet (B flat clarinet), electric guitar, vibraphone, cello, doublebass, and tape
- The Heart Tears for Saxes and Brass (1998), 4 saxes (soprano, alto, tenor, baritone), 4 trombones, 4 trumpets, and tape
- Resonant Twilight (1998), orchestra, and tape
- Twilight's Dance (2000)
- Entropic Twilights (1997–2002)
- Rave #1 (2005), trumpet, electric guitar, vibraphone, piano, acoustic or electric bass, and tape

== Recordings ==
- The Threshold of Deafening Silence (Tronia, TRD 0190, 1990)
- L'ivresse de la vitesse (empreintes DIGITALes, IMED 9917/18, 1994, 1999)
- Twilight's Dance (Immersion, Starkland 2010, 2000) (5-channel DVD-Video)
- Seuil de silences (empreintes DIGITALes, IMED 0369, 2003)
- L'ivresse de la vitesse 1 (empreintes DIGITALes, IMED 0317, 2003)
- L'ivresse de la vitesse 2 (empreintes DIGITALes, IMED 0318, 2003)
- Délires de plaisirs (empreintes DIGITALes, IMED 0577, 2005)
- Who Has the Biggest Sound? (Starkland ST-220, 2014)
