= Stephen Brown (composer) =

Canadian composer (born 1948)

- Born: Stephen John Brown; August 16, 1948 (age 77); Nottingham, England
- Occupations: Composer, Conductor, Teacher
- Website: www.stephenbrown.ca

Stephen John Brown (born August 16, 1948) is a Canadian composer. He holds ARCT Diplomas in both Theory and Composition from the Royal Conservatory of Music and is an Associate of the Canadian Music Centre. Brown, composer-in-residence, at the Victoria Conservatory of Music, British Columbia, was the Composition and Theory Department Head, and an examination designer and syllabus design consultant for the Royal Conservatory of Music of Toronto. He served as a juror for the British Columbia Arts Council (performance & composition), and is a clinician and adjudicator in Western Canada.
