= Leo Marchildon =

- Born: May 30, 1962 (age 64); Toronto, Ontario, Canada

Leo Marchildon (born May 30, 1962) is a Canadian organist, music director, film/theatre music composer and producer based in Prince Edward Island.

== Early life and education ==
Marchildon was born in Toronto, Ontario. He has French-Canadian ancestry.

== Career ==
Marchildon's first commercial album, To Each is Given, based on inspirational poetry, was released in 1998. He and co-writer Adam-Michael James teamed up to create the stage musical The Nine Lives of L.M. Montgomery based upon the life of the Canadian author.

In 2014 Marchildon premiered a symphonic tribute to Canada entitled "Canada, Our Dear Home", a 20-minute work for voice and orchestra celebrating the various cultural influences and indigenous Island fiddle music which helped to shape and support PEI's role as the Birthplace of Confederation. In 2016 he was hired to compose underscore music for the Watermark Theatre summer productions of "The Glass Menagerie" and "Blithe Spirit" in Rustico, PEI, and again in 2018 for their production of "Dial M for Murder".

Marchildon has performed as a guest soloist with the PEI Symphony. In 2017 he was commissioned by them to compose part of the Cantata for Canada 150; his "Song of a Tree", based on a poem by Madison Lockman, premiered in November of that year at the Confederation Centre of the Arts in Charlottetown.

Marchildon also creates musical arrangements for choirs and soloists and is music director/organist for St. Dunstan's Basilica in Charlottetown, Prince Edward Island, as well as music director for the Diocese of Charlottetown. He was also conductor for the Strathgartney Chamber Orchestra, which later became PEI Pops!.
