= David Squires (composer) =

Canadian composer

David Squires (born 1957) is a Canadian composer and the dean of the School of the Arts, Media and Culture at Trinity Western University.

== Early life and education ==
Squires received a bachelor's degree in music (Performance) from University of Western Ontario in 1979, a masters in music (Composition) University of Toronto in 1981, and a doctorate in (Composition) State University of New York at Buffalo in 1993.

== Career ==
From 1984 to 1987 Squires was the conductor of the Fraser Valley Symphony. Squires has been on the faculty at TWU music for 15 years and was a worship pastor there for 11 years. His scholarly interest is in Christian spirituality and new music, and he has also taught composition, music history, 20th-century composers and Christian spirituality, and Worship design and leadership.

Squires' composition "Ride" was performed in 1997 by the Lethbridge Community Band.

His composition "Table Songs", a communion liturgy for flexible instrumentation, premiered in November 2004; "God Ever Breath", for mezzo-soprano, flute, piano, string orchestra, premiered in November 2005. "Where Angels Danced" was premiered in November 2007 by the Trinity Western Orchestra with violinist Brielle Goheen.

Squires is the initiator of TWU's Worship Studies Minor and has been instrumental in developing the program. Beginning in 2003, the program studies contemporary worship music, issues regarding worship leadership, and worship theology and history. In 2007, he was appointed the new dean of the Faculty of Professional Studies and Performing Arts, which is now the School of the Arts, Media and Culture.

In 2018 Squires toured to the United Kingdom with the band Trinity Worship Project; the group was serving as the opening band for the U.K.-based Rend Collective.
