= Stephen Codman =

Canadian composer

Stephen Codman (c. 1796 – 6 October 1852) was a Canadian composer of English descent. His known compositions all date from before 1835, and mainly consist of works for solo voice or vocal ensembles.

== Early life and education ==
Codman was born in Norwich, England. He was a pupil of John Christmas Beckwith and William Crotch.

== Career ==
In 1816 Codman came to Canada to assume the post of organist at Holy Trinity Anglican Cathedral in Quebec City, most likely succeeding John Bentley. He remained in that post up until his death in Quebec City 36 years later.

Two of his songs, The Fairy Song and They Are Not All Sweet Nightingales, were published by Goulding, D'Almaine, and Co in 1827, placing them among the oldest published Canadian compositions. He also wrote an instrumental piece for the organ, titled "Invocation".

Codman died in Quebec City on 6 October 1852.
