= Richard Hunt (pianist) =

Canadian pianist and composer

Richard Hunt (1930 – December 8, 2011) was a Canadian pianist and composer of British birth. He is best known for his work with the Montreal ensemble Quartango.

== Early life and education ==
Hunt was born in Great Britain. He was trained as a pianist at the Royal Academy of Music in London and at McGill University in Montreal where he was a pupil of István Anhalt, Bengt Hambraeus and Bruce Mather.

== Career ==
As a soloist Hunt performed in concert with several notable ensembles in Canada, including the Montreal Symphony Orchestra and the Quebec Contemporary Music Society. He is a former faculty member of McGill University.

In 1983 Hunt became a founding member of the chamber ensemble Quartango with whom he performed on the piano, made several commercial recordings and composed and arranged more than 100 works. He remained with the group until shortly before his death in 2011.

== Selected compositions ==
- "Merkabah" (1973)
- “Milonga Céltica"

== Recordings ==
- El Fuego (2009) with Quartango
