= Jacques Faubert =

Canadian composer, conductor and music educator

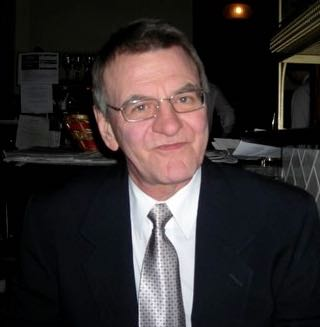
- Faubert in 2014
- Born: 30 May 1952 (age 74); Salaberry-de-Valleyfield, Quebec, Canada
- Education: Conservatoire de musique du Québec à Montréal; Paris Conservatory
- Occupations: Composer, conductor, educator

Jacques Faubert (born 30 May 1952) is a Canadian composer, conductor, and music educator, known for founding the Mont-Royal Symphony Orchestra.

== Early life and education ==
Faubert earned premiers prix in harmony, counterpoint, and fugue from the Conservatoire de musique du Québec à Montréal (CMQM) where he studied with Jean-Louis Martinet, Gaston Arel, and Pierre Mollet from 1970 to 1976. He then went to France to study at the Paris Conservatory with Marcel Bitsch and Jacques Castérède from 1976 to 1979, earning premier prizes in fugue and music analysis.

== Career ==
Faubert served as a professor of music at the Conservatoire de musique du Québec à Trois-Rivières.

In 1985 his choral work "Messe de la Saint-Jean-Baptiste", commissioned by the Archdiocese of Montreal, was premiered by a 150 voice choir at St-Jean-Baptiste Church. That year joined the music faculty of the CMQM, where he taught harmony until 2005. He also composed two psalms for the vocal group Arioso.

In 1986 Faubert conducted the newly formed choir of the Orchestre Métropolitain.

In 1987 Faubert founded the Mont-Royal Symphony Orchestra and its choir. He directed both until 1997, after which he shared some of these responsibilities with Michel Brousseau.
