= Maurice Zbriger =

Canadian violinist and composer

Maurice Zbriger (July 10, 1896, Kamenets-Podolskiy, Ukraine – April 5, 1981, Montreal, Quebec, Canada) was a Canadian violinist, composer and conductor. He began learning violin as a child, and continued his studies at the conservatory in St. Petersburg, Russia, where he was a classmate of Jascha Heifetz, Nathan Milstein and Mischa Elman.

== Career ==
He left Russia in 1920 and traveled throughout Europe, until he arrived in Montreal in 1924. He quickly found work there at His Majesty's Theatre, in silent film houses, and other venues. He was one of the founders of the Traymore Quartet in 1925, which later became the Traymore Salon Orchestra. He was one of the first Canadians to specialize in Roma music and performed and conducted for a radio show that ran on the station CKAC for 40 years.

Zbriger became a partner in, and eventually the sole owner of, the Montreal Hebrew Delicatessen. Better known as "Schwartz's", this restaurant is famous for its distinctive Montreal-style smoked meat. With the profits from this business, Zbriger spent many thousands of dollars organizing free concerts of his music.

Zbriger was unable to pursue a career as a concert violinist because his wife was in poor health. Mrs. Zbriger was a pianist and co-composed music with Maurice, until her death after 65 years of marriage.

Many of Zbriger's compositions were dedicated to famous people. He wrote The Vincent Massey March (1952) for the Canadian statesman of the same name, while "Mother's Lullaby" (1948) was dedicated to Charles, Prince of Wales upon his birth. The individuals honored by Zbriger frequently received copies of the music with letters he commissioned.

In his later years, arthritis in his hands prevented Zbriger from performing publicly, though he continued to compose and conduct until his death.

== Sources ==
- D. Allaire. "Maurice Zbriger". Encyclopedia of Music in Canada.
- Ianzelo, T. (Director), Courtois, D. & Symansky, A. (Producers). (1993). The Concert Man. [Motion picture]. Ottawa: National Film Board of Canada
