= Desmond Gaspar =

Canadian musician, conductor, and composer

Desmond Gaspar is a Canadian organist, pianist, conductor, composer and songwriter who works as a freelance concert artist and ballet pianist who won the Associateship and Fellowship diplomas of the Royal Canadian College of Organists in consecutive years while under 30 years of age, thus being one of a very small number of Canadians under that age to achieve that distinction at the time.

Gaspar studied under Earle Moss (piano), Molly Sclater (theory), Roman Toi (composition) and Heather Spry (organ and church music) from the University of Toronto and the Royal Conservatory of Music in Toronto, during which time he received numerous performance and competition awards.

His eclectic career in liturgical music, dance accompaniment, choir-directing and other disciplines has taken him to various venues in Canada, the United States and Europe.

A Fellow of the Royal Canadian College of Organists (winning the Associateship and Fellowship Diplomas in consecutive years as well as the Charles Peaker and the Healey Willan Prizes respectively with those attempts, scoring the highest mark in Canada for the latter), Gaspar was one of a very small number of Canadians who won that professional designation under the age of thirty at the time of his receiving it. He has also conducted chamber orchestras, massed choirs and jazz combos in addition to writing a number of uniquely crafted classical songs (based on T.S. Eliot's cycle Prufrock and Other Observations). In 2007 he appeared in Los Angeles at the "TAXI" convention in a gala promo event featuring some original songs from his collection, entitled The Dancer and I.

From 2005 to 2007 Gaspar stepped in as Associate Organist at St. Paul's Anglican Cathedral, London, Ontario, where he performed in the Cathedral concert series as organ accompanist which often featured members of Orchestra London – and where he was publicly declared "A World Class Musician" on two occasions by the Cathedral Dean, now Bishop, Terry Dance.

== Personal life ==
Gaspar, born in Toronto, Ontario, Canada, began his music studies at a young age with trumpet and demonstrated considerable musical ability at an early age. By age thirteen, after having learned the Haydn trumpet concerto and the challenging Puedert Studies, he began to show more interest in the piano and abandoned the trumpet altogether for some twenty five years. After having finished with his piano and then later, organ studies, he resumed playing jazz trumpet with Jack Hayter and the Con Brio Band in Stratford as well as with the dance band "The Royal Aires".

In 2002, he took a long working sabbatical to focus on composition, song writing, jazz and other disciplines and has worked intermittently as a church musician including his short stint at the London Cathedral. He performed two full length recitals in 2010 in addition to some other guest solo appearances and continues his work as a Ballet accompanist on a regular basis in Toronto.

== List of compositions ==
Lieder (art songs – voice and piano): Prufrock (Song Cycle based upon poems by T.S. Eliot): Lovesong, Portrait, Prelude #1, Prelude #2, Prelude #3;
Lo and Behold

Choral: Agnus Dei (setting for SATB choir, divided passages and solo-soprano passage included)

Pop songs (voice and piano): Dancer and I (Collection): Dancing 'round the Fire, Dancing Alone, Happy and Free, Dreams For Two, Dancing with you, Beautiful Dancer, Mystic Dreams, The Dancer and I, Playful Colours, Lovesong, Magick

Lovers (Collection): Crazy 'bout you, Coming Home, Penny Love

== Discography ==
- Lovers
- The Dancer and I
- For the Father and the Son
