= Éric Morin =

Canadian composer (born 1969)

Éric Morin (born 20 December 1969) is a Canadian composer. He has been awarded several prizes for his compositions, including the 2003 Jules Léger Prize for New Chamber Music for his D'un Château l'autre and the CBC Radio National Competition for Young Composers which he won twice. His works have been performed by several notable musical ensembles, including the Esprit Orchestra, the National Arts Centre Orchestra, the Quebec Contemporary Music Society, and the Toronto Symphony Orchestra among others. He has been commissioned to write works by the Canada Council for the Arts and the Conseil des arts et des lettres du Québec.

== Life and career ==
Born in Montreal, Morin is a graduate of the Conservatoire de musique du Québec à Montréal where he was a pupil of Gilles Tremblay, He pursued graduate studies at the Conservatoire de Paris from 1996 to 1998 where he earned a Master of Music in composition and was a student of Gérard Grisey. He then entered the doctoral music composition program at the University of Toronto in the Fall of 1998. After completing his degree, he studied at the IRCAM where he took courses in musicology and 20th-century music.

Morin was appointed composer-in-residence of the Toronto Symphony Orchestra in May 2000, a position he held for two years. In September 2000 he joined the faculty of Université Laval where he is currently a professor of music composition and orchestration.

== Selected works ==
- Elegy, for string quintet (2001)
- Bombs away, for orchestra (1999)
- D'un château l'autre, for string quintet and 15 instruments (1998)
- Clone, for wind quintet and piano (1997)
- For Crying out loud, for four instruments (1996–1997)
- Un, deux, beaucoup, for orchestra (1993–1994)
