= Analia Llugdar =

Argentine composer

Analia Llugdar (born 1972) is an Argentine composer living and working in Montreal, Quebec since 1999. She has created both instrumental and vocal compositions and has won several music competitions.

== Early life and education ==
Llugdar was born in Argentina. She earned a Bachelor of Music degree in piano performance from the National University of Córdoba in 1999. She then entered the graduate music program at Laval University in Quebec City, Quebec, Canada, but soon transferred to the Université de Montréal where she graduated with a Master of Music and a Doctor of Music in composition. Among her teachers at the school were José Evangelista and Denis Gougeon.

== Career ==
Llugdar won first prize in the chamber music category of the CBC Radio National Competition for Young Composers. She also won the Jeunesses Musicales du Canada Award and the Grand Prix of the Canada Council for the Arts,

Llugdar won the 2008 Jules Léger Prize for New Chamber Music for her work "Que sommes-nous". Her composition "Tricycle" was performed by the Trio Fibonacci, and included on their 2009 album 5 x 3.

In 2010, Llugdar received a $15,000 Canada Council grant. That year her composition "La Machi" was premiered in Montreal,

In 2015, her musical interpretation of Frederico Garcia Lorca’s poem "Romance de la luna, luna" was premiered by soprano Kristina Szabó as part of the Soundstreams music series in Toronto.
