= Bruce Holder =

Canadian musician (1905–1987)

Bruce Edward Holder Sr. (January 8, 1905 – August 27, 1987) was a Canadian composer, conductor, and violinist. He helped to conduct, teach, and found many music groups, including Symphony New Brunswick, the New Brunswick Youth Orchestra, and the Third Field Artillery Band, which earned him his nickname, Mr. Music of Saint John.

== Early life and education ==
Holder was born in Saint John, New Brunswick. He took violin lessons as a child, and later studied conducting in Hancock, Maine, under Pierre Monteaux.

== Career ==
Holder worked at the Ocean Steel and Construction Company. In 1948 Holder was a volunteer with the Saint John Salvage Corps. For fifteen years, beginning in the 1940s, he led the CBC Radio orchestra for the programs Holiday for Strings, Music Styled for Strings, and Fanfare. 1945 he opened a record store in Saint John. In 1950 Holder became first violinist of the Saint John Symphony Orchestra.

In 1957 he began teaching music at Saint John Vocational School, and in 1967 he was assistant conductor of the New Brunswick Youth Orchestra.
