= Rui Shi Zhuo =

Chinese-Canadian composer

Rui Shi Zhuo (Chinese: 卓汭仕, born 1956) is a Chinese-born Canadian composer, based in British Columbia. He has been commissioned by the Canada Council, and has written music for an animated film. He has been composer-in-residence for the Vancouver Chinese Music Ensemble.

== Early life and education ==
Rui received his bachelor's degree in music from the Shanghai Conservatory in 1986; he then completed his master's degree in music at the University of British Columbia, where he studied with Keith Hamel and Stephen Chatman.

== Career ==
In 2003 Rui was nominated for a Leo Award for his music written to accompany the National Film Board short The Chinese Violin.

An album of Rui's compositions was released by Artifact Music in 2004.

In 2011 Rui and Dorothy Chang composed the score for the animated film Mountain High River Flow"¦without end. In 2014 he composed music for the BC Chinese Music Ensemble. He is also the conductor of Vancouver youth philharmonic orchestra.
