= Alfred Mignault =

Canadian organist and composer (1895-1961)

- Born: 8 December 1895; Saint-Augustin-de-Desmaures, Quebec, Canada
- Died: 10 July 1961 (aged 65) Montreal, Quebec, Canada
- Occupations: Organist, composer, music educator
- Instrument: Organ
- Years active: 1916–1961

Alfred Joseph Édouard Mignault (8 December 1895 – 10 July 1961) was a Canadian organist, composer, and music educator. A largely self-taught composer, his compositional output includes both vocal and instrumental works such as songs, works for solo piano, choral works, and works for orchestra. Some his compositions were published by Adélard Joseph Boucher and Archambault Musique. His most well known work is his 1944 Messe brève de requiem.

== Life and career ==
Born in Saint-Augustin-de-Desmaures, Mignault received his earliest musical training from his mother who was an organist trained by Romain-Octave Pelletier I. In 1916 he began studying the piano with Alfred La Liberté. He briefly pursued studies at the Université de Montréal but dropped out to pursue private music studies with pianist Léo-Pol Morin and organists Eugène Lapierre and Émile Lambert.

In the early 1920s, Mignault held organist posts briefly at St-Alphonse d'Youville, St-Étienne, Ste-Cunégonde, Ste-Catherine, and St-Georges in Montreal. In 1924 he was appointed organist at St-Enfant-Jésus Church, a position he held through 1957. He also served as that church's choirmaster from 1944 to 1957. In 1937 he began working as an organist and pianist for CBC Radio, appearing on radio broadcasts periodically up into the 1950s. He notably succeeded Henri Letondal as artistic director of the CKAC radio program L'Heure provinciale from 1938 to 1940.

In 1943, Mignault joined the music faculty of the Conservatoire de musique du Québec à Montréal where he taught solfège and musical dictation through 1961. He also taught voice and solfège for the Montreal Catholic School Board from 1944 to 1957. He died in Montreal in 1961 at the age of 65. His son André Mignault had a successful career as a cellist.
