= Louis-Philippe Laurendeau =

Louis-Philippe Laurendeau (1861 in St-Hyacinthe, Canada East – 13 February 1916 in Montreal) was a Canadian composer and bandmaster. He also held an editorial position with Carl Fischer, the New York music publishers.

Most of Laurendeau's compositions and arrangements were for concert or military band and were published primarily by Fischer and Cundy-Bettoney. He also composed works of specific Canadian interest, such as Shores of the St Lawrence, a medley for band, and Land of the Maple, Opus 235, a march. He wrote, as well, on music pedagogy, including volumes on band instruction and arranging for band. He occasionally wrote under the pseudonym, Paul Laurent.

He is most familiar to audiences throughout the world through his band arrangement of Julius Fučík's 1897 march, Entrance of the Gladiators (originally entitled Grande Marche Chromatique). Laurendeau arranged the march for American Wind bands, and Carl Fischer published this in 1901 under the title "Thunder and Blazes". The work is the best-known circus march in the world and has become a musical icon for that form of entertainment.

== Sources ==
- The Canadian Encyclopedia : Louis-Philippe Laurendeau
