= Joseph-A. Fowler =

Canadian musician (1845–1917)

Joseph-A. Fowler (14 November 1845 – 4 January 1917) was a Canadian composer, organist, choirmaster, pianist, and music educator. His compositional output mainly consists of sacred music, although he did compose some secular songs for voice and piano and a number of works for solo piano. He wrote two masses for choir and orchestra: Mass of the Blessed Virgin Mary (published by I. Suckling & Sons, 1893) and Mass of the Sacred Heart (published by Whaley Royce, 1898).

== Life and career ==
Born in Montreal, Fowler was the son of an Irish father and a French-Canadian mother. He studied the piano with Paul Letondal and was notably one of his first students. He visited Europe three times during his life, experiences which enriched his musical life. At the age of 16 he began teaching at the Collège Sainte-Marie de Montréal where he worked for seven years. From 1868 to 1890 he taught at the Sacré-Coeur Convent at Sault-au-Récollet just outside Montreal. Among his notable pupils were Alexis Contant and Arthur Pépin. He also occasionally organized concerts and promoted artists in Montreal, notably bringing Irish baritone William Ludwig to the city among other performers.

An active recitalist and accompanist on the piano, Fowler notably performed Ludwig van Beethoven's Variations on God Save the Queen in an 1870 concert organized by Adélard Joseph Boucher on the occasion of composer's centenary birth. He also served as the organist/choirmaster at St. Patrick's Basilica, Montreal from 1868 until his retirement in 1908. He was named an organist emeritus by St. Patrick's and in 1915 he donated an organ to the church's Lady Chapel.
