= Boleslaw Szczeniowski =

Canadian aeronautical engineer and composer of Polish descent

- Born: 20 July 1898; Poland
- Died: 1985 (aged 86–87); Montreal, Quebec, Canada
- Education: Lviv Polytechnic
- Occupations: aeronautical engineer, composer

Boleslaw Szczeniowski (20 July 1898 – 1985) was a Canadian aeronautical engineer and composer of Polish descent. A graduate of the school of engineering at Lviv Polytechnic, Szczeniowski made a living as an engineer in Montréal. He published two books: Theory of the siphon jet (published by the National Advisory Committee for Aeronautics, 1955) and Theoretical analysis of combustion gases (Montreal, 1946).

As a composer and musician, Szczeniowski was largely self-taught. He composed a significant amount of vocal music and works for solo piano and a small amount of chamber music.

== Compositions ==
=== Symphonic ===
- Rustic Dance

=== Vocal music ===
- 1954 The rainbow, - text: Marja Konopnicka
- 1954 Will-o'the wisp, - text: Hanna Gross
- 1955 Entends tu…/ Do you hear…, text: Mario Gross
- 1955 Les tenebres/Dusk, - text: Mario Gross
- 1955 Mon chant, - text: Mario Gress
- 1955 Poranek/Morning, - text: Marja Konopnicka
- 1956 Poeme, - text: Marc Gelinas
- 1956 Little Jack Horner
- 1958 La lune dans l'eau, - textt: Wilfrid Lemoine
- 1958 Le petit lapin de la lune, - text: Cecile Duchene
- 1958 Pierrot, - text: Wilfrid Lemoine
- 1959 A poor young Sheppard - text: Paul Verlaine
- 1959 Un grand sommeil noir, - text: Paul Verlaine
- 1960 The house of the hill, - text: Edwin Arlington Robinson
- 1961 Song for the rainy season, - text: Elizabeth Bishop
- 1977 To the dog howling in the middle of the street, - text: Kazimierz Wierzynski
- Ashes - text: Kazimierz Wierzynski
- A door is closing - text: Hanna Gross
- A la clair fountaine
- A little love story/Un petit amour - text: Beata Obertynska
- Chanson des ivrognes, slow-boggie - text: Mario Gross
- Le ciel est par-dessus, text: Paul Verlaine
- Drinking song
- Fall, tekst: Hanna Gross
- Gra w lisa, Foxy - text: Marja Konopnicka
- Je voulais te dire
- Little rain, text: Marja Konopnicka
- Popiot, Ashes-Cendres - text: Kazimierz Wierzynski
- Rues desertes/Deserted streets, - text: Mario Gross
- To sleep, darling/Oj, usnij, - text: Marja Konopnicka
- Swialton, light-lumiere - text: Kazimierz Wierzynski
- Vision/Wizja, - text: Marja Konopnicka
- What lips my lips have kissed, - text: Edna St. Vincent Millay
- What should I sing you/A co wam spiewac, - text: Marja Konopnicka
- Winter ballad - text: Hanna Gross

=== Chamber music ===
- String Quartet No. 1 (1956)
- String Quartet No. 2 (1962)

=== Piano works ===
- 1976 The Gentle Wind
- Seven Etudes
  1. For seconds - Allegro
  2. For thirds - Allegro
  3. For fourths - Andante
  4. For fifths - Andantino
  5. For sixths - Allegretto
  6. For sevenths - Andante
  7. For octaves - Largo
- Pieces
  1. Prélude
  2. Rite sauvage
  3. L'aube au Lac Noir
  4. Le caribou mourant
  5. Thème russe
  6. Thème ibérique
  7. Promenade aux chutes Darwin
  8. Le vent
  9. Le ruisseau
  10. Le moulin
  11. Labourage
  12. Songe
  13. La pluie
  14. Automne
  15. Une fontaine
  16. Une prière
  17. La course
  18. Le retour
  19. Une barque
  20. La nuit
  21. Thème polonais
  22. Le renard
  23. Berceuse
  24. Berceau
  25. Les hirondelles
  26. Été

== Sources ==
- Ronald Napier: A Guide to Canada's composers, Willowdale, Ontario: Avondale Press, 1973, p. 50
- Storm Bull: Index to biographies of contemporary composers - Vol. II, Metuchen, N.J.: Scarecrow Press, 1974, 567 p.
