= Stéphane Roy (composer) =

Stéphane Roy is an acousmatic composer. His works have been programmed throughout Europe and the Americas. His latest album, L’inaudible, received the 2019-2020 Prix Opus — Album of the year, Electroacoustic Music.

Born in Saint-Jean-sur-Richelieu, Roy earned both a doctorate degree in electroacoustic composition and a PhD in musicology from the Université de Montréal. He is the author of L'analyse des musiques électroacoustiques: Modèles et propositions (published 2003, Paris; 2003-04 Prix Opus — Book of the Year), a book on electroacoustic music analysis. He has taught composition, auditory perception and electroacoustic music analysis in various universities and music conservatories, in Québec and abroad. Once in a while he gives lectures on electroacoustic music analysis.

Stéphane Roy is an Associate Composer of the Canadian Music Centre (CMC), and his works have been published on audio support by various labels, including empreintes DIGITALes (Kaleidos, 1996; Migrations, 2003; L’inaudible, 2019). He lives in Rimouski, Quebec, Canada.

== Recordings ==
- Coups de foudre (empreintes DIGITALes, IMED 25198, 2025)
- L'inaudible (empreintes DIGITALes, IMED 19162, 2019)
- Migrations (empreintes DIGITALes, IMED 0373, 2003)
- Kaleidos (empreintes DIGITALes, IMED 9630, 1996)

== List of works ==
- Le cri des sirènes (2026)
- Après, les cendres (2023)
- Avec le temps... (2022)
- Bestiaire à hauteur d'oreille (2022), Table de Babel and tape
- Les aurores pourpres (2019)
- Maelström (2016)
- Voix crépusculaires (2014)
- Train d'enfer (2011)
- Les Territoires secrets (2008-2019)
- Appartenances (2003)
- La basilique fantôme (1998, 2000), guitar and tape
- Crystal Music (1994)
- Inaccessible azur (1997), instrumental quartet and tape
- Masques et parades (2000–2003)
- Mimetismo (1992), guitar, and tape
- Ondes / Arborescences (1987)
- Paysages intérieurs (1988)
- Récit pour cordes (1998)
- Résonances d'arabesques (1990)
- Trois petites histoires concrètes (1998)
- Une âme nue glisse à l'eau vive (2005), film: Denis Chabot / 2005 / 35 mm / colour / animation / 15 min 55 s / no dialogue
