= David MacIntyre (composer) =

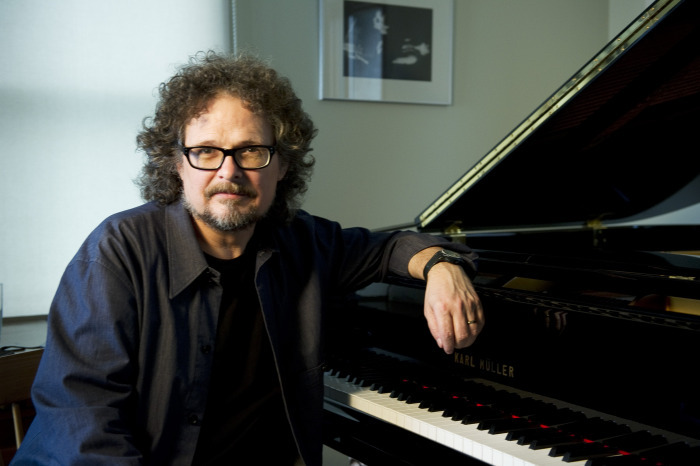

Background information
- Born: David Keith MacIntyre; 1952 (age 73–74); Yorkton, Saskatchewan, Canada
- Occupations: Composer, professor

David MacIntyre (born 1952) is a Canadian composer of opera, music theatre, choral, orchestral and chamber music, and site-specific works in dance and theatre, based in Vancouver. From 1979-2017, he was professor of music at Simon Fraser University in Vancouver. His music has been performed in more than thirty countries.

== Early life and education ==
MacIntyre was born in Yorkton, Saskatchewan; as a child, he studied brass instruments, theatre arts, voice and piano. In 1969, he attended the Banff School for Fine Arts. He attended the University of Saskatchewan (1970–72), where he studied composition with Murray Adaskin, voice with Dorothy Howard, and University of Victoria (73-75 B.Mus and 77-79 M.Mus), where he studied composition with Rudolf Komorous, conducting with George Corwin, and voice with Selena James. In 1977, he wrote his first opera Humulus the Mute on a libretto by Jean Anouilh, translation by Michael Benedickt. Humulus the Mute was premiered in 1979 in a production conducted by George Corwin, directed by the composer and featuring Erika Kurth and Richard Margison.[9]

== Career ==
In 1979, MacIntyre was invited to join the faculty at Simon Fraser University where he co-founded the Contemporary music program and where he taught courses in music composition and interdisciplinary collaboration in the School for the Contemporary Arts for thirty-eight years until his retirement as professor emeritus on September 1, 2017.

In 1983, MacIntyre collaborated with choreographer Karen Jamieson to create Sisyphus, which was named one of the ten best choreographic works of the twentieth century by Danse Canada Dance magazine. In 1988, his music for Piazza for ten saxophones and twenty-four dancers created in collaboration with Montreal choreographer Jean-Pierre Perreault received excellent notice from Anna Kisselgoff in the New York Times: "Certainly the score by David MacIntyre, a composer from Vancouver, British Columbia, worked to perfection in its fragmentary structure. Separate phrases (not always melodic) were often played by soloists but also by all 10 instrumentalists, creating rich overlapping textures.".

In 1989, Vancouver New Music produced David MacIntyre's Sanctuary, a 75 minute site-specific performance of instrumental theatre for string orchestra, conductor and boy soprano conducted by Owen Underhill, featuring concertmaster Victor Costanzi and boy soprano Scott Shymko at the Vancouver East Cultural Centre. This critically acclaimed work was broadcast nationally three times, once on CBC's flagship program Two New Hours and twice on the French service Radio Canada. In 1992, the CBC Radio Orchestra commissioned and premiered Home for horn soloist and string orchestra featuring horn virtuoso Martin Hackleman and conducted by Owen Underhill for broadcast on CBC's Two New Hours. MacIntyre's opera The Architect, created in collaboration with playwright Tom Cone, was the first opera ever commissioned by Vancouver Opera and premiered on June 11, 1994 at the Vancouver Playhouse for four principal singers, chorus and orchestra conducted by Leslie Uyeda for eight performances as part of Vancouver Opera's 1993-94 season. That year he composed Ave Maria for treble voices in six parts, commissioned and premiered by Elektra Women's Choir, conducted by Diane Loomer. Ave Maria has become his most widely known and performed composition following its international debut in 1996 at the Sydney Opera House for the World Choral Symposium.

In 1998, he collaborated with dancer/choreographer Catherine Lubinsky to create and perform Squeeze, a duet for musician and dancer in a 75 minute performance at the Vancouver East Cultural Centre featuring concertina-driven song and dance.

In 2009 MacIntyre was commissioned to write a song, Hammer, on words by Tom Wayman for the 150th anniversary of British Columbia. His 2012 opera cabaret Love in Public , a staged, four-singer setting of Elizabeth Barrett Browning's poetry collection Sonnets from the Portuguese, was nominated for Outstanding Original Composition by Jesse Richardson Theatre Awards in 2012.

MacIntyre's musical drama Tom Pinkerton, The Ballad of Butterfly's Son (2008), created in collaboration with playwright Hiro Kanagawa, was shortlisted for Best Musical of 2012 by the Playwrights Guild of Canada.

== Style ==
MacIntyre is predominantly known as a composer for the theatre; he has written operas, music theatre works, instrumental theatre works, art songs, and choral works. His music emphasizes rhythm, lyricism and smooth orchestration.

== Personal ==
In 1990, MacIntyre met dancer Catherine Josephine Lubinsky and they married in 1992.

== Selected works ==
- Humulus the Mute (1977)
- "Sisyphus" (1983)
- "Piazza" (1988, with Jean-Pierre Perreault)
- "Sanctuary" (1989)
- "Home" (1992)
- "The Architect" (1994, with Tom Cone)
- "Ave Maria" (1994)
- "Squeeze" (1998, with Catherine Lubinsky)
- "Love in Public" (2004)
- "Alleluia" (2011)
- Late Canadian Carols (2016)
