= Alan Detweiler =

Alan Gregory Detweiler (15 June 1926 – 25 February 2012) was a Canadian composer, author, and patron of the arts. He was born in Toronto, Ontario, Canada and attended the Toronto Conservatory of Music. He obtained degrees in philosophy at the University of Toronto and Trinity College Dublin, and earned a Ph.D. in the Aesthetics of Music from the University of London. His composition teachers included Lennox Berkeley and Howard Ferguson. His major works include David and Goliath (1969), a masque for soloists, SATB chorus, and small ensemble, and Theseus and the Minotaur (2011). Alan Detweiler created and administered the annual Detweiler Competition, which awarded prizes for the visual arts at Upper Canada College in Toronto and Bedford School in England.
