= List of Haitian Canadians =

This is a list of notable Haitian Canadians, including both original immigrants who obtained Canadian citizenship and their Canadian descendants.

To be included in this list, the person must have a Wikipedia article showing they are Haitian Canadian, or have references showing they are Haitian Canadian and are notable.

== List of notable Haitian Canadians ==
=== Artists ===
- Marie-Denise Douyon – painter, graphic artist
- Leonel Jules – painter
- Guerdy J. Préval – painter
- Fabienne Colas - artist

=== Athletes ===
- Jennifer Abel – Olympic swimmer
- Bennedict Mathurin – NBA basketball player
- Joachim Alcine – professional boxer
- Wyn Belotte – professional soccer player
- Patrice Bernier – professional soccer player
- Maxime Boisclair – professional Canadian hockey player
- Francis Bouillon – defenceman for the Montreal Canadiens
- Zachary Brault-Guillard – professional soccer player
- Félix Brillant – professional soccer player
- Dayana Cadeau – Haitian-born Canadian American professional bodybuilder
- Marc Calixte – professional soccer player
- Mikael Cantave – professional soccer player
- Obed Cétoute – professional Canadian Football League player
- Kenny Chery – professional basketball player
- Gilles Colon – former professional Canadian Football League player
- Samuel Dalembert – professional basketball player for the Milwaukee Bucks
- Jonathan David – professional soccer player
- Anthony Duclair – professional hockey player
- Edrick Floréal – Olympic long and triple jumper
- Raymond Fontaine – professional Canadian Football League player
- Maxime Fortunus – professional ice hockey player
- Jems Geffrard – professional soccer player
- Jean-Luc Grand-Pierre – professional hockey player
- Ronald Hilaire – former CFL defensive lineman; current head coach of McGill Redmen
- Schiller Hyppolite – professional boxer
- Yves Jabouin – mixed martial arts fighter
- Dierry Jean – professional boxer
- Osvaldo Jeanty – professional basketball player
- Luguentz Dort – National Basketball Association Player
- Loudia Laarman – sprinter
- Georges Laraque – professional hockey player
- David Loiseau – mixed martial arts fighter, the first Haitian-Canadian to fight in the Ultimate Fighting Championship
- Elkana Mayard – professional soccer player
- Josué Mayard – professional soccer player
- Pierre-Rudolph Mayard – professional soccer player
- Olivier Occéan – professional soccer player
- Jean Pascal – professional boxer
- Jimmy-Shammar Sanon – professional soccer player
- Adonis Stevenson – professional boxer, current WBC Light Heavyweight Champion
- Bermane Stiverne – professional boxer
- Bruny Surin – Olympian gold medal winning sprinter
- Tammara Thibeault – professional boxer
- Claude Vilgrain – professional hockey player

=== Business ===
- Ralph Gilles – automobile designer (Chrysler 300)

=== Entertainment ===
- Benz Antoine – actor
- Bad News Brown – musician
- Jephté Bastien – film director
- Miryam Charles – filmmaker
- Fabienne Colas – actress, director and producer and head of the Fabienne Colas Foundation
- Fayolle Jean – actor
- Fayolle Jean Jr. – actor
- Garihanna Jean-Louis – comedian, actress and writer
- Anthony Kavanagh – comedian
- Yasmine Mathurin – documentary filmmaker
- Mireille Métellus – actress
- Vanessa Morgan – actress
- Widemir Normil – actor
- Panou – actor
- Henri Pardo – filmmaker
- Frédéric Pierre – actor
- Will Prosper – filmmaker
- Quddus – MTV veejay
- Isabelle Racicot – television and radio host
- Sagine Sémajuste – actress
- Catherine Souffront – actress and singer
- Wesli – musician
- Richardson Zéphir – actor and comedian

=== Literature ===
- Marie-Célie Agnant – author and poet
- Georges Anglade – geographer and writer
- Paul Arcelin – writer
- Gérard Étienne – writer
- Gary Klang – poet and novelist
- Dany Laferrière – novelist
- Nadine Magloire – writer
- Émile Ollivier – writer
- Anthony Phelps – writer

=== Music ===
- Marc Antoine – singer
- Athésia – singer-songwriter
- Carmen Brouard – pianist, composer and music educator
- Régine Chassagne – musician with group Arcade Fire
- Dominique Fils-Aimé – musician
- Pierre Gage – singer-songwriter
- Roi Heenok – rapper
- Imposs – rapper
- DL Incognito – rapper
- Kaytranada – electronic musician, producer and DJ
- Yvon Krevé – hip hop artist
- Mélissa Laveaux – musician
- Marie-Josée Lord – opera soprano
- Luck Mervil – Quebec-based rock singer
- Muzion – rap group
- Wesli – musician
- Édouard Woolley – tenor, actor, composer, and music educator

=== Politicians ===
- Jean Alfred – former MNA for Hull
- Dominique Anglade – MNA for Saint-Henri-Sainte-Anne and leader of the Liberal Party of Quebec
- Vivian Barbot – former MP for Papineau in Montreal
- Frantz Benjamin – MNA for Viau and former Montreal city councillor for Saint-Michel
- Ulrick Chérubin – former mayor of Amos, Quebec
- Emmanuel Dubourg – MP for Bourassa, former MNA of Viau in Montreal
- Michaëlle Jean – journalist and Canada's first black Governor General
- Firmin Monestime – mayor of Mattawa, Ontario and the first elected black mayor in Canada
- Suze Youance - Senator for Lauzon, Quebec
- Jude Guerrier - 2019 MP Candidate for Scarborough North Ontario , former Police Inspector
- Dr Eric Pierre Serves as Haitian’s Honorary consul general in Toronto

== See also ==
- Canada–Haiti relations
- Haitian diaspora
- List of Haitians
- List of Haitian Americans
- Black Canadians in Montreal
