= Gagnier =

Gagnier is a surname. Notable people with the surname include:

- Charles Gagnier (born 1985), Canadian freeskier
- Claire Gagnier (1924–2022), Canadian soprano
- Ed Gagnier (baseball) (1882–1946), French-American baseball player
- Ed Gagnier (gymnast) (born 1936), American gymnast and coach
- Ève Gagnier (1930–1984), actress and singer in Quebec
- Gérald Gagnier (1926–1961), Canadian bandmaster, composer, and trumpeter
- Holly Gagnier (born 1962), American actress
- J.-J. Gagnier (1885–1949), Canadian musician and music educator
- John Gagnier (1670?–1740). French orientalist
- Joseph Gagnier (1854–1919), Canadian clarinetist
- Laurent Gagnier (born 1979), French footballer
- Pierre Gagnier, Quebec politician
- Regenia Gagnier (born 1953), scholar of Victorian and modern British literature
- René Gagnier (1892–1951), Canadian musician
- Vincent Gagnier (born 1993), Canadian professional freestyle skier

== See also ==
- Garnier (disambiguation)
- Gaynier (disambiguation)
