= Colombe Pelletier =

Canadian pianist, coach and accompanist

- Born: May 12, 1923; Montreal, Quebec, Canada
- Died: April 11, 2021 (aged 97); Montreal, Quebec, Canada
- Occupations: Pianist; Coach; Accompanist

Colombe Pelletier (May 12, 1923 – April 11, 2021) was a Canadian pianist, coach and accompanist. She made her solo debut in 1944 and toured Canada for the Jeunesses Musicales Canada (YMC). Pelletier accompanied several Canadian and foreign artists on recital tours by the YMC and played for vocal productions. She was an examiner for the École Normale de Musique de Paris, a coach at the JMC Orford Art Centre, for CBC, the Montreal Festivals, the Opera Guild of Montreal, and the Théâtre du Nouveau Monde.

== Early life and education ==
Pelletier was born in Montreal, Quebec on May 12, 1923, and had a sister. She began studying piano at the age of six, and earned her Bachelor of Music degree from the Conservatoire national de musique in 1940, winning the gold medal in the baccalaureate examamination. Pelletier earned her Bachelor of Arts degree in 1942 under the lectureship of Antonio Létourneau on piano for six years and theory with Eugène Lapierre for a year. She enrolled at the École Normale de Musique de Paris in September 1949 with the support of bursaries from the Government of Quebec and was tutored by Jules Gentil and Alfred Cortot. Pelletier graduated with a Licentiate in Music degree in 1952, having specialized in the art of accompaniment. She studied Lieder interpretation with Ernst Reichart at the Mozarteum in Salzburg in mid-1956.

== Career ==
She played with Les Variétés lyriques, and made her debut as a solo performer on the piano in Montreal in March 1944. Pelletier performed in concerts in Belgium and France, and accompanied a host of Quebec artists on international tours, on radio, on stage and on television, such as Colette Boky, Claire Gagnier, Joseph Rouleau, André Turp and Richard Verreau. Between late 1952 and 1953, she toured Canada for the Jeunesses Musicales Canada (YMC), giving 35 concerts as a guest artist with Marthe Létourneau and Jean-Paul Jeannotte. Pelletier played at venues such as the Ritz-Carlton Hotel in Montreal, and the Salle de l'Auditorium, Laval. She also accompanied several Canadian and foreign artists on recital tours by the YMC, Eugene Kash and Ginette Martenot from 1958 to 1959; Gaston Germain between 1965 and 1966; Guy Fallot from 1968 to 1969; the violinist Andrzej Grabiec, the singers Anna Chornodolska and Bruno Laplante, the oboist Bernard Jean, and the violinist Adele Armin between 1972 and 1973.

Under the YMC, Pelletier played for the vocal productions as Jean Vallerand's Le Magicien and Claude Debussy's L'enfant prodigue from 1961 to 1962, Roberto Hazon's L'Amante Cubista between 1967 and 1968, and Gioachino Rossini’s The Barber of Seville from 1976 to 1977. From 1962 to 1967, she was the official accompanist for the JMC National Competition, and was an examiner for the École Normale de Musique de Paris in 1963. Pelletier was a coach at the JMC Orford Art Centre from 1962 to 1973 and served in that role for the CBC, the Montreal Festivals, the Opera Guild of Montreal, and the Théâtre du Nouveau Monde. She and Turp recorded Jeannotte's Propos intimes. Pelletier suffered a stroke and stopped playing the piano in 2018.

== Death ==
She died in the palliative care unit of Hôpital Jean-Talon, Montreal, Quebec on April 11, 2021. A ceremony for Pelletier was held at the Centre funéraire Côte-des-Neiges on the afternoon of July 1, 2021.
