= Royal Canadian Ordnance Corps =

Former administrative corps of the Royal Canadian Army (1919–1968)

- Corps royal canadien des munitions
- Corps badge
- Active: 1919–1968
- Country: Canada
- Branch: Canadian Army
- Type: Administrative corps
- Role: Supply chain management, transportation, human resource management, finance, and food services, movements, postal, and ammunition
- Size: Corps
- Garrison/HQ: Montreal
- Mottos: Honi soit qui mal y pense (Anglo-Norman for 'Shame to him who thinks evil of it'); from the motto of the Order of the Garter)
- March: "The Village Blacksmith"

The Royal Canadian Ordnance Corps (RCOC; French: Corps royal canadien des munitions, CRCM) was an administrative corps of the Canadian Army. The corps traced its roots back to the Canadian Stores Department. Formed in 1871, the Canadian Stores Department was a civil department of the Canadian government. This civil service was charged with control of forts, ammunition, stores, buildings and an ordnance depot left by the departing British military.

On 1 July 1903 the responsibilities of the Canadian Stores Department were transferred to the Ordnance Stores Corps. In 1907 it was renamed the Canadian Ordnance Corps (COC).

== World War I ==
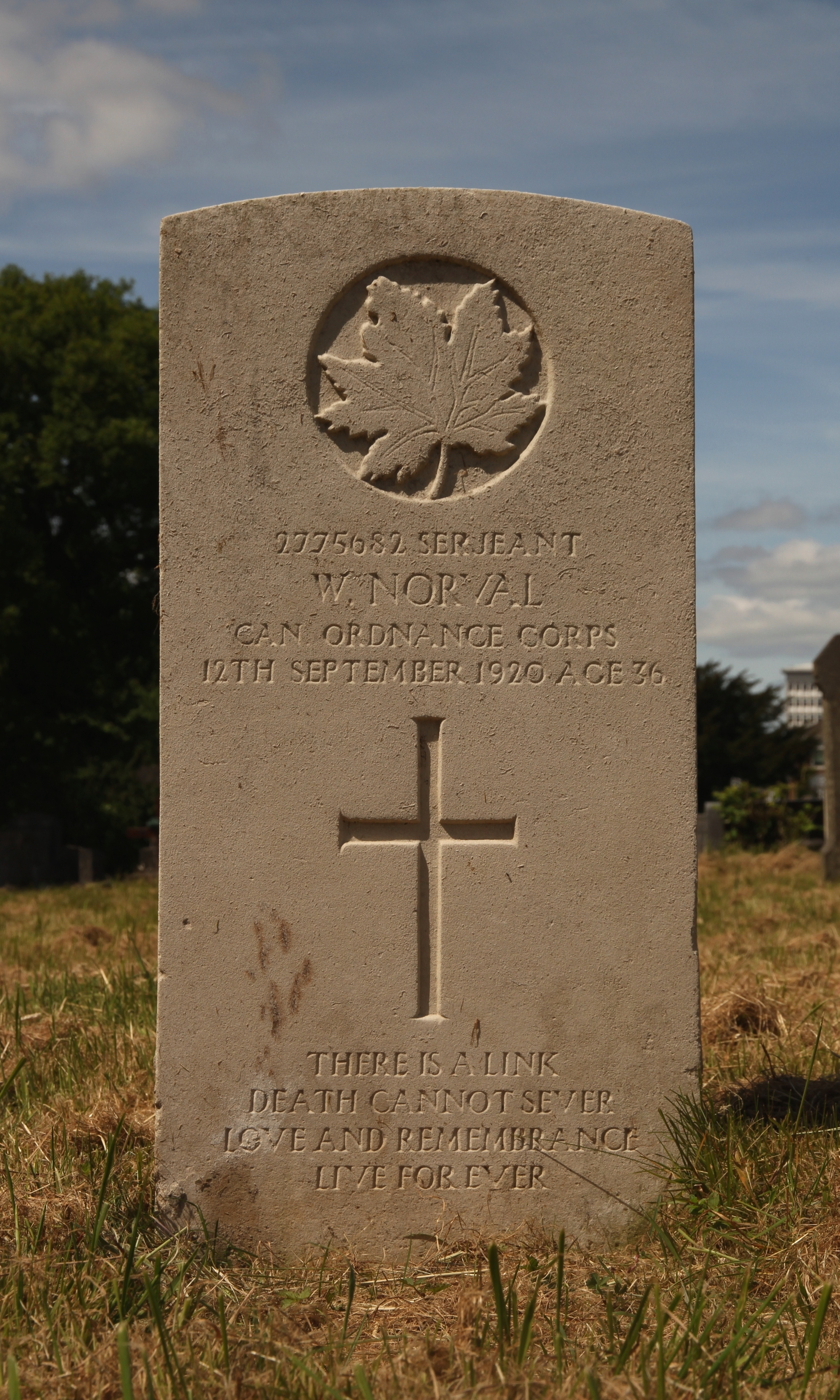
Grave in Cathays Cemetery, Cardiff of Sgt W Norval, who died in September 1920

In the First World War the COC, in conjunction with the Canadian Army Service Corps, was supporting 400,000 men, 150,000 French civilians and 25,000 horses. In 1919, for recognition of outstanding service during the war, King George V authorized the “Royal” designation.

== World War II ==
The Militia component of the now-Royal Canadian Ordnance Corps was not authorized until 1912, and redesignated with the Royal prefix in 1936 (probably on 29 April 1936).

During the Second World War, the corps had a strength of 35,000 military personnel, not including the thousands of civilian personnel employed at corps installations. They procured all the material goods required by the army, from clothing to weapons. Up until 1944, the RCOC was responsible for maintenance and repair. Ordnance field parks, which held and stored everything from spare parts to spare artillery, supported field formations including the divisions and I and II Canadian Corps.

== Post-war ==
The Canadian Ordnance Corps was redesignated The Royal Canadian Ordnance Corps on 22 March 1948. It reverted to the previous name on 18 April 1955. In 1960, 1 Ordnance Field Park moved from Edmonton to Calgary and in 1968 merged with the base supply organization to become the Supply Company of 1 Service Battalion. A memorial in Cobourg, Ontario, dedicated to the personnel who served as part of 26 Central Ordnance Depot, RCOC, consists of a large depiction of the corps's badge.

== Unification ==
When the Canadian Army, Royal Canadian Navy, and Royal Canadian Air Force were merged in 1968 to form the Canadian Forces, the administrative corps of the army were deactivated and merged with their naval and air force counterparts to form the Canadian Forces' personnel branches.

The RCOC was combined with the transport and supply elements of the Royal Canadian Army Service Corps to form the Logistics Branch.

== Traditions ==
=== Colonel-in-chief ===
Elizabeth II, Queen of Canada, was the last colonel-in-chief of the RCOC. Kings George V, Edward VIII, and George VI all served as previous colonels-in-chief of the corps.

=== Motto ===
King George VI granted the RCE the same mottoes as the Royal Army Service Corps, which was one of its British equivalents. Honi soit qui mal y pense (Anglo-Norman for 'Shame to him who thinks evil of it') was the motto used since 1937. It originated from the era of the inception of the Order of the Garter, an order of chivalry which was the original user of this motto. The motto is also used by the Grenadier Guards, the Royal Army Service Corps, the Royal Australian Army Service Corps, and the Hauraki Regiment.

=== Royal designation ===
The Canadian Ordnance Corps was redesignated the Royal Canadian Ordnance Corps on 3 November 1919. As a matter of honour, King George V, the Canadian monarch, bestowed on the organization the right to use the prefix royal before its name.

=== Badge ===
The badge of the RCOC consists of a belt, with the royal crown on top, with the text "Honi soit qui mal y pense" with six maple leaves around the edge. At the centre of the belt is a shield superimposed with three cannonballs and three cannons. At the bottom the text "Royal Canadian Army Service Corps" is written on a ribbon.

=== Band ===
The RCOC maintained a military band in its ranks up unit the corps's dissolution in 1968. The band was established as a unit of the Canadian Army in 1956 with an establishment of 55 musicians based at Longue-Point (later CFB Montreal). Among its members included Gérald Gagnier, a bandmaster and composer who served in the band from 1956 until his death in 1961. Gagnier's uncle J.-J. Gagnier was notably the founder of the Canadian Grenadier Guards Band. Other notable members included Charles Villeneuve and Laurence Henry Hicks. In mid-June 1944, the band performed in Normandy following the D-Day landings, during which the director of music recalled that "we were mobbed by the troops particularly after we played the 'Colonel Bogey March' which everyone enjoyed". In 1958, the band took part in a concert with American composer Morton Gould, who conducted the band which was standing directly on the Canada–United States border. In September 1959, the band performed the "Vice Regal Salute" for Georges Vanier during his swearing-in as Governor General of Canada in Ottawa. In 1967, the band was one of 17 from Canadian Army, Royal Canadian Navy, and Royal Canadian Air Force to take part in the Canadian Armed Forces Tattoo 1967 in honor of Canada's centennial year celebrations.

=== RCOC Association ===
The Royal Canadian Ordnance Corps Association was a defence association authorized on 9 March 1945 and was recognized by the Conference of Defence Associations in early 1946. It was established as many senior RCOC officers recognized the desire for a post-World War association for former officers who had served in the RCOC and had no intent on continuing in the Regular Force. Its constitution was adopted on 20 April 1948 and Major General J. H. McQueen was elected as its first president.

== See also ==
- List of Canadian organizations with royal prefix
