= Isabelle Delorme =

Canadian musician (1900–1991)

Isabelle Delorme (4 November 1900 – 20 February 1991) was a Canadian composer, pianist, and music educator. As a composer, her works are lyrical in nature and follow more traditional ideas of harmony as opposed to the avant-garde music that was in vogue in her day. She was an active recitalist but is best remembered for her impact as a teacher of music theory.

== Career ==
Delorme was born in Montreal. She began her professional studies at the École supérieure de musique d'Outremont with Sister Madeleine-Marie. She later studied privately with pianist Arthur Letondal and violinists Albert Chamberland and Agostino Salvetti. In 1918 she earned a teaching certificate from the Académie de musique du Québec.

Delorme developed an interest in music composition in the late 1920s, and pursued formal training in this area with Claude Champagne from 1929 to 1939. She later studied with Nadia Boulanger at the American Conservatory in Fontainebleau during the summers of 1955 and 1956. She wrote a modest body of symphonic works, piano works, and chamber music between 1940 and 1960, all of which remain unpublished. However, several of her pieces were played by the CBC Montreal Orchestra for broadcasts on Canadian radio, of which her Andante (1941) received several repeat performances. Her other orchestral works include Fantaisie, Choral et Fugue, Prélude et Fugue, Suite, and Berceuse dans le style ancien.

As an educator, Delorme began teaching as a professor of music theory and solfège at the newly formed Conservatoire de musique du Québec à Montréal in 1943 through the invitation of Wilfrid Pelletier. She remained at that school through 1969, during which time she also taught at the Conservatoire de musique du Québec à Québec for a few years and at the Ursuline Convent in Trois-Rivières among other schools. She wrote a treatise on harmony in 1967 which earned the admiration of Boulanger, but remains unpublished. Among her notable students are Andrée Desautels, Jacques Hétu, Roger Matton, François Morel, and André Prévost. She died in her home city of Montreal.
