= Gérald Gagnier =

Gérald Gagnier (14 October 1926 – 14 January 1961) was a Canadian bandmaster, composer, and trumpeter. His compositional output includes the symphonic poem Polyphème, a Prélude for piano, a Suite romantique for strings, and Rolandineries for piano.

== Life and career ==
Born in Montreal, Gagnier was the son of musician René Gagnier and received his earliest musical training in the trumpet, piano, and music theory from him. His grandfather Joseph Gagnier had 26 children, many of whom also became professional musicians of note; including Armand Gagnier, Ernest Gagnier, Guillaume Gagnier, J.-J. Gagnier, Lucien Gagnier, Réal Gagnier, and René Gagnier. Several of his cousins became notable musicians, including Claire Gagnier, Ève Gagnier, and Roland Gagnier. He attended the Séminaire Saint-Joseph de Trois-Rivières from 1939 to 1945 where he received his general education.

In 1945 Gagnier entered the Conservatoire de musique du Québec à Montréal where he studied through 1951. During that time he also spent three summers studying under Pierre Monteux. He also spent some time mentoring François Morel in conducting. In 1954 he earned a diploma from the Royal Military School of Music after passing tests given by a traveling examiner.

Gagnier began his career as a trumpeter in the Canadian Grenadier Guards Band which was conducted by his uncle J.-J. From 1946 to 1949 he taught at the Studio Labelle and then joined the staff of Mont-St-Louis College in 1951. He was appointed assistant director of the Opéra national du Québec in 1951. He directed several bands for the Canadian Army with whom he held the rank of lieutenant, including Les Fusiliers Mont-Royal during the early 1950s and the Royal Canadian Ordnance Corps Band from 1956 until his death in Montreal in 1961.
