= Andrée Desautels =

Canadian musician, musicologist and music educator (1923–2023)

Andrée Desautels CM (9 October 1923 – 23 February 2023) was a Canadian musician, musicologist and music educator.

== Early life and training ==
The daughter of Victor Desautels and Cédia Brault, she was born in Montreal on 9 October 1923. Desautels studied piano with Isabelle Delorme and studied at the École supérieure de musique d'Outremont. She went on to study at the Conservatoire de musique du Québec à Montréal with Germaine Malépart, Isabelle Delorme and Claude Champagne. Desautels also studied the history of art and literature at the University of Montreal. At the Conservatoire de Paris, she studied music history with Norbert Dufourcq and aesthetics with Marcel Beaufils and Alexis Roland-Manuel. She also studied privately with Andrée Vaurabourg (composition and orchestration), with Nadia Boulanger (analysis) and with Maurice Martenot (ondes Martenot). Three of her vocal works were performed at the École Normale de Musique de Paris in 1947.

== Career ==
Desautels returned to Montreal in 1949 and taught music history and musicology at the Conservatoire de musique du Québec à Montréal until she retired in 1988. She also taught music history at the University of Montreal and the École de musique Vincent-d'Indy from 1961 to 1964. She was a commentator for concerts at the Jeunesses musicales du Canada (JMC) from 1949 to 1966 and was managing editor for the JMC's journal from 1951 to 1956. Desautels also was responsible for the programming at the JMC pavilion at Expo 67. She wrote and introduced a number of series on music for Radio Canada.

Her students included Jacques-André Houle, Richard Boulanger, Nicole Labelle and Liette Yergeau.

Desautels contributed articles and reviews to various newspapers and periodicals; she also contributed to various publications including the Encyclopedia of music in Canada and The New Grove Dictionary of Music and Musicians.

Desautels wrote incidental music for the play La Fille du soleil by Carl Dubuc and for the Radio Canada performance of the play Antigone by Jean Anouilh.

In 1951, she was elected to the Société française de musicologie. From 1967 to 1970, she was a member of the Canada Council. She founded the Association des professeurs of the Conservatoire de musique du Québec and served as its president from 1960 to 1968. In 1988, she received a medal from the Quebec National Assembly. In 1995, she was named to the Order of Canada.

== Personal life and death ==
Desautels died on 23 February 2023, at the age of 99.
