= Verdickt =

Verdickt is a surname. Notable people with the surname include:

- Benoît Verdickt (1884–1970), Canadian organist
- Joseph Verdickt (1894–?), Belgian racing cyclist
