= Conservatoire national de musique =

Conservatoire national de musique was a music conservatory in Montreal, Quebec that was actively providing higher education in music during the first eight decades of the 20th century. Founded in 1905 by Alphonse Lavallée-Smith as the Conservatoire national de musique et de l'élocution, the school gained the official right to teach music, diction, elocution, drawing, and painting and to grant diplomas through a 1906 letters patent from Secretary of State Richard William Scott. A few years later it was renamed the Consservatoire national Ltée. By 1912 the conservatoire had granted 250 diplomas. Jean-Noël Charbonneau served as the school's director from 1915-1922 followed by Benoît Poirier from 1923-1925.

In 1921 the conservatoire became affiliated with the Université de Montréal (UM) and from here on was known as the Conservatoire national de musique. Eugène Lapierre, who had been the conservatory's secretary since 1922, was appointed the school's director in 1927, a post he held until 1970. He notably reorganized the institution in the model of a European conservatory in 1928, having visited numerous European school's from 1924-1927. This restructuring was made possible through the generous financial support of Edmond Archambault of Archambault Musique and Joseph Versailles, and through the administrative help of Lapierre's brother Albert, Alexandre d'Aragon, and Antonio Létourneau.

In 1951 the conservatoire broke its ties with the UM and resumed independent management. Élise Chapdelaine, who had been secretary since 1940, served as interim director following Lapierre's death in 1970. Édouard Woolley, a graduate of the institution, was director in 1971-5 and was succeeded by the school's last director, Chapdelaine.

== Notable alumni ==
- Gaston Allaire
- Émilien Allard
- Françoise Aubut
- Gérard Caron
- Albertine Caron-Legris
- Claude Champagne
- Lucien Martin
- Colombe Pelletier
- Paul Pratt

== Notable faculty ==
- Victoria Cartier
- Albert Chamberland
- Claude Champagne
- Jean-Noël Charbonneau
- Eugène Chartier
- Alexis Contant
- Camille Couture
- Auguste Descarries
- Orpha-F. Deveaux
- J.-J. Gagnier
- François Héraly
- Alfred La Liberté
- Arthur Laurendeau
- Arthur Letondal
- Germaine Malépart
- Rodolphe Mathieu
- Léo-Pol Morin
- Albertine Morin-Labrecque
- Frédéric Pelletier
- Benoît Poirier
- Marcel Saucier
- Joseph-Élie Savaria
- Benoît Verdickt
