= Vinette (name) =

Vinette is a feminine given name and a surname. People with the name are as follows:

== Given name ==
- Vinette Ebrahim (born 1957), South African actress
- Vinette Robinson (born 1981), British actress

== Surname ==
- Alice Vinette (1894–1989), Canadian composer
