= Canadian Grenadier Guards Band =

Canadian military band

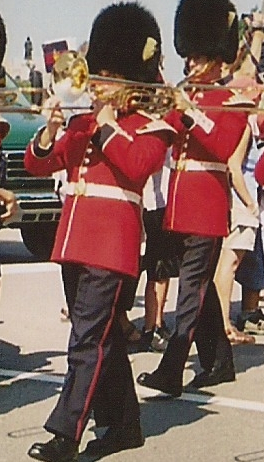
- A CGG musician parading with the Band of the Ceremonial Guard in 2005.

Background information
- Also known as: His Majesty's Canadian Grenadier Guards Band
- Origin: Montreal, Quebec, Canada
- Genres: Classical, military
- Years active: April 26, 1913–1974
- Labels: His Master's Voice, Victor Talking Machine Company, RCA

The Canadian Grenadier Guards Band (sometimes referred to as His Majesty's Canadian Grenadier Guards Band) was a Canadian military band that was active for more than 60 years during the 20th century. In addition to performing for military events, the band had an active concert schedule which brought them to performance venues throughout North America. The group also made several recordings on a variety labels and appeared on numerous radio broadcasts in both Canada and the United States.

== History ==
The Canadian Grenadier Guards Band (CGGB) was founded in Montreal on April 26, 1913, through the financial support and initiative of Frank Stephen Meighen. The regimental band's initial purpose was to accompany parades and other regimental activities. However, while the group performed this function, they became more well known for their performances as a concert band. The ensemble played an unusually varied repertoire for a band of its time period, playing both new music and works by major composers like Ludwig van Beethoven, Hector Berlioz, Jules Massenet, Giacomo Meyerbeer, Camille Saint-Saëns, and Richard Wagner. They also incorporated music by Canadian composers into their programs, such as Alexis Contant's Marche héroïque. Composer Claude Champagne was an original member of the band and he wrote Ballade des lutins for the grenadiers in 1914. Other notable band members included Hervé Baillargeon, Francis Boucher, Rudi Martinus van Dijk, Gérald Gagnier, René Gagnier, and Paul Pratt.

The band also featured guest singers, including Bertha Crawford in 1922.

Conductor J.-J. Gagnier was appointed the CGGB's first director by Meighen upon the ensemble's founding in 1913. He remained in that post for the next 34 years. During his tenure the ensemble toured throughout North America and appeared on CBC Radio, CBS Radio, and NBC Radio. They also made appearances at the Canadian National Exhibition in 1921 and 1929. During World War II the band was stationed the 2nd Battalion of The Royal Canadian Regiment. Gagnier's last appearance with the CGGB was in 1947 for a meeting of the United Nations at the Montreal Forum. He retired soon after with the rank Captain.

After Gagnier's retirement, the CGGB was disbanded for the next 5 years. In 1952, the band was reformed under the leadership of Lieutenant Norman Mouland. He was succeeded in 1959 by Sgt-Maj Joe Miceli. Miceli remained in that position until 1964. He was succeeded by Cpl Miglio Delauro a trumpet player who had served under Joe Miceli. Dilauro left in 1966. Capt Henry Rzepus a Montreal musician took over the band which operated until 1974 when the Department of National Defence decided to merge the various regimental bands into a single ensemble, the Montreal Garrison Band. Under Gagnier's leadership, the CGGB made seven 78 rpm records for His Master's Voice and one record for the Victor Talking Machine Company.

Recorded albums included:

- RCA Victor 216605 (Side A: Souvenir de Quebec Part 1 // Side B: Souvenir de Quebec Part 2)

- RCA Victor 216606 (Side A: Le Reve Passe // Side B: Aupres de ma blonde)

- RCA Victor 216619 (Side A: Regimental March Royal Canadian Regiment // Side B: Regimental March RCASC "Wait for the Wagon"

- RCA Victor 216611 (Side A: Regimental March - Royal 22nd Regiment "Vive la Canadienne" // Side B: Regimental March Les Fusiliers de Mont-Royal "Jock O' York"

The ensemble made no recordings under Mouland, but did record one LP record, On Parade, with Miceli for RCA Records in 1964.

Today, the CGG still maintains a musical presence in the Canadian Army, by providing musicians to serve in the Band of the Ceremonial Guard, which currently parades with the CGG.

== See also ==
- Canadian military bands
- Band of the Grenadier Guards
- The Canadian Grenadier Guards
