= Lydia Boucher =

Canadian composer (1890–1971)

Lydia Boucher (28 February 1890 – 5 March 1971) was a Canadian composer, music educator, and nun. She was active as a composer from 1923 to 1971, producing several choral works and pieces for solo piano and organ. Most of her works are sacred and many of them were published by L'Édition Belgo-Canadienne, Musica Enrégistré, and Éditions canadiennes. Her first composition was Ave Maria (1923) and her last work was Hommage à Mère Marie-Anne (1971). Of particular note is her oratorio L'Oeuvre d'Esther Blondin which premiered in 1949. Some of her other notable pieces include the piano works Trois Préludes (1928–30) and La Ronde des aiguilles (1950), and the Alleluia for organ (1958).

== Life and career ==
Born in Saint-Ambroise-de-Kildare, Quebec, Boucher studied music with Claude Champagne (music composition), Fleurette Contant (singing), J. Alexandre Delcourt (violin), Auguste Descarries (piano and composition), Rodolphe Mathieu (piano and harmony), Louis Michiels (composition), and Raoul Paquet (organ). She became a novitiate at the Sisters of Saint Anne in 1907. She took her vows in 1909 at which time she took the name Sister Marie-Thérèse. Composer Alice Vinette (Sister Marie-Jocelyne) was a contemporary of Boucher's.

Boucher was active as a teacher of piano, voice, violin, and organ from 1909 to 1969. She taught at several different schools and institutions during her 60-year teaching career, including the Maison-Mère Mont-Ste-Anne in Lachine and the École de musique Wilfrid-Pelletier in Montreal. She died in Montreal in 1971 at the age of 81.
