= Joseph Gagnier =

Joseph Gagnier (5 April 1854 – 9 April 1919) was a Canadian clarinetist and the father of an important Canadian family of musicians.

== Life and career ==
Born in L'Ancienne-Lorette, Quebec, Gagnier moved to Montreal in 1874 after deciding to pursue a music career. In that city he studied the clarinet with Oscar Arnold and Jacques Vanpoucke. He was also a student of music theory with Joseph Geai and Ernest Lavigne.

Gagnier began his career performing in the orchestras of a variety of Montreal theatres during the late 1870s and 1880s. From 1890-1919 he was clarinetist at Sohmer Park. In the 1905-1906 season he, along with his son J.-J. Gagnier, became a bassoonist in J.-J. Goulet's Montreal Symphony Orchestra, following the ensemble's unsuccessful attempt to acquire two bassoonists among the city's other musicians. He continued to play with that orchestra as a clarinetist up into the latter years of his life. He died in Montreal in 1919.

Gagnier was the father of 27 children. He taught music and a variety of instruments to most of them, "thus forming a veritable Gagnier orchestra". Many of his children became notable musicians, including Armand Gagnier, Ernest Gagnier, Guillaume Gagnier, J.-J. Gagnier, Lucien Gagnier, Réal Gagnier, and René Gagnier. Several of his grandchildren became notable musicians, including Claire Gagnier, Ève Gagnier, Gérald Gagnier, and Roland Gagnier.
