= Rodolphe Mathieu =

Canadian musician (1890–1962)

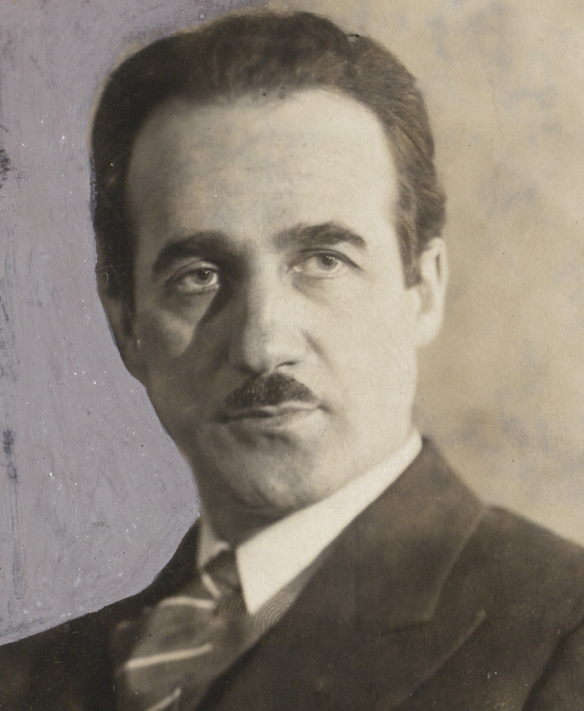

Joseph Rodolphe Mathieu (10 July 1890 – 29 June 1962) was a Canadian composer, pianist, writer on music, and music educator. The Canadian Encyclopedia states, "Considered too avant-garde for his time because of Debussy's influence on his music, Mathieu gained recognition too late to inspire the generation that followed." The pianist Léo-Pol Morin was one of the few important exponents of his work, notably including Mathieu's Chevauchée and Trois Préludes in his concert repertoire. Mathieu's song Un peu d'ombre (1913) was included in a number of recitals given by Marguerite Bériza and Sarah Fischer in Europe.

== Early life and career in Canada ==
Born in Grondines, Quebec, Mathieu's parents were farmers. In 1906 he moved to Montreal where he began to study the piano with Alphonse Martin and singing with Céline Marier at the age of 16. Through Marier he met pianist and composer Alfred La Liberté who instilled within him an admiration for the works of Alexander Scriabin. He soon began composing music. His first major work was the choral piece Le Poème de la mer (1908) which he dedicated to Marier. Many of his early piano compositions display a strong influence of Scriabin, including Chevauchée (1911) and Sonata (1927).

Mathieu obtained the post of organist at St-Jean-Berchmans Church in Montreal in 1907. In 1908 he opened his own teaching studio in Montreal which he ran for over the next decade. He also taught at the Conservatoire national de musique. Many of his students became winners of the prestigious Prix d'Europe, including Jean Dansereau, Auguste Descarries, Wilfrid Pelletier, and Ruth Pryce. In 1910 he began studying music composition, the organ, and the piano with Alexis Contant.

== Studies in France ==
In 1920 Mathieu entered the Schola Cantorum in Paris on the advice of Albert Roussel. His studies were initially made possible through the generous support of funds raised by his friends, and later by a 1923 grant from the Quebec government (notably the first such grant awarded to a composer) which enabled him to continue studies in France for four more years. At the Schola Cantorum he studied composition with Vincent d'Indy and conducting with Vladimir Golschmann. He also studied psychology at the Collège de France with Pierre Janet. Several of his most important works were composed during his time in France, including String Quartet, Trio, Monologues for violin, and Dialogues for violin and cello.

== Later life and career ==
Mathieu returned to Montreal in 1927, at which time he began teaching at the convent of the Sisters of Ste Anne at Lachine and at the Institut pédagogique of the Sisters of the Congregation of Notre-Dame in addition to operating his own private studio. In 1929 he founded the Canadian Institute of Music, an organization whose aim was to enable "young artists and literary talents to perform before an elite audience". He directed the organization until its disbandment in 1956. From 1930 to 1952 he organized the "Soirées Mathieu", an intermittent concert series which featured concerts by himself, many of his pupils, and other notable musicians. After 1934 he composed few works, choosing instead to focus on his work as a teacher. Among his pupils during the 1920s to 1950s were Fleurette Beauchamp-Huppé, Lydia Boucher, Pierre Brabant, Raymond Lévesque, and Alice Vinette. He also taught André Mathieu, the son of his marriage to the violinist Mimi Gagnon, who had a highly successful career as a concert pianist.

In 1955 Mathieu joined the faculty of the Conservatoire de musique du Québec à Montréal where he taught music analysis through 1959. Of the few compositions he wrote during this time was the Quintet for piano and strings which is viewed as one of his best works. He began his last piece, Symphonie pour voix humaines for six-voice choir with brass accompaniment, in 1956 but never completed the work. He died in Montreal in 1962 at the age of 71. He was named an associate of the Canadian Music Centre posthumously and many of his papers and manuscripts are part of the collection at the Library and Archives Canada.
