= Gaston Allaire =

Canadian musician and educator (1916–2011)

Visit Gaston Allaire's musicology at www.allairefictamusic.com

Joseph Georges-Émile Gaston Allaire (18 June 1916 – 15 January 2011) was a Canadian musicologist, organist, pianist, composer, and music educator of American birth. His compositional output includes several preludes for organ, an organ work on French carols, some motets and other choral works, a communion service, a prelude and fugue for string orchestra, and a polyphonic mass. He also wrote Suite laurentienne for orchestra from which the Poème and the Menuet were premiered by the Quebec Symphony Orchestra in 1949, and composed the music for the 1953 film The Man on the Beach. His Marche (1964) and Petite Suite (1965) were both written for the Royal Canadian Ordnance Corps Band.

== Early life and education ==
Born in Berlin, New Hampshire to parents Marie and Xavier, Allaire moved with his family to Danville, Quebec when he was just two years old. His mother was a homemaker and his father was the station master for the Danville train station. The eldest of 9 children, he began studying the organ and piano as a child. He began professional studies in the organ in Victoriaville in 1934, continuing with his education in Quebec City in 1936. He entered the Conservatoire national de musique in Montréal in 1940 where he was a pupil of Auguste Descarries (piano) and Eugène Lapierre (organ). After earning a Bachelor of Music from the conservatoire in 1947, he pursued further studies in fugue, orchestration, and music composition with George Rochberg in Philadelphia from 1948 to 1950.

In 1953 Allaire entered the University of Connecticut where he earned a Master of Arts in music history and composition in 1956. He went on to earn a PhD in musicology from Boston University in 1960 after writing a doctoral thesis entitled The masses of Claudin de Sermisy. He pursued further studies in musicology in Europe and the United States through grants from the Canada Council (1961-2), a Fulbright Fellowship (1962), and a grant from the Ministère des Affaires culturelles du Québec (1965). In 1973 he was awarded a fellowship from the Canada Council to pursue musicological research in Spain.

== Career ==
From 1962 to 1967 Allaire taught on the music faculty of Loyola College in Montreal. He then served on the music faculties of the Université de Montréal (1966–1967) and the Université de Moncton (1967–1984). At the latter institution he served as a research officer from 1969 to 1973, president of the Canadian Folk Music Association in addition to being a lecturer. After his retirement from teaching in 1984 he was named professor emeritus at the Université de Moncton. He continued to research and publish articles on renaissance polyphonic vocal music with the Revue Belge de Musicologie, and on his website allairefictamusic.com which he kept up until 2010

As a performer, Allaire toured as both an organ and piano recitalist throughout Canada. A number of these recitals were nationally broadcast on CBC Radio between 1967 and 1970. As a writer and musicologist he contributed articles to several musical journals, including the Revue de musicologie (Paris), the Music Scene, EMC, the Boston University Journal, and the journal of the University of Moncton. He also served as president of the Canadian Society for Traditional Music from 1968 to 1971 and was editor of that organization's newsletter from 1969 to 1971.
