= Ida Héraly =

Canadian pianist and music educator

Ida Héraly (20 May 1860 – 1942) was a Canadian pianist and music educator. Born Ida Campbell in Sherbrooke, Canada East, she was the wife of clarinetist and bandmaster François Héraly. She earned a diploma from the Canadian College of Music where she studied piano with a Mrs Holland who had studied at the Conservatoire de Paris. Although active as a recitalist, she became chiefly known for her work as an educator, giving instruction in piano, solfège, and harmony in Montreal for a total of 54 years. Her most famous pupil was conductor Wilfrid Pelletier, founder of the Montreal Symphony Orchestra and long time Metropolitan Opera conductor, whom she taught from 1904 to 1914. She was his first music teacher and had a profound impact on his early life and career.
