= Orpha-F. Deveaux =

Orpha-F. Deveaux (July 24, 1872 – December 1933) was an American organist, pianist, and music educator. Born in Saginaw, Michigan, he studied at the New York College of Music with Mat Schmidt and privately in Montreal with Alexis Contant and Percival J. Illsley. He began working as an organ and piano teacher in Montreal circa 1901 and in 1905 he obtained the post of organist at Église Tres-St-Nom-de-Jésus Church in that Hochelaga/Maisonneuve. He became a faculty member and secretary of the Conservatoire national de musique in 1914, where he taught courses in organ, piano, theory, and harmony. Among his notable pupils were Claude Champagne, J.-J. Gagnier, Paul Pratt, and Hedwige Saint-Jacques. He left Montreal in 1923 to assume the post of organist with the Dominican fathers in Fall River, Massachusetts. He died in Hartford, Connecticut in 1933.
