= René Gagnier =

Canadian conductor, composer, euphonium player, violinist, and music educator

René Gagnier (30 May 1892 – 25 May 1951) was a Canadian conductor, composer, euphonium player, violinist, and music educator. His compositional output includes several marches, waltzes, works for solo violin, and some chamber and symphonic music, all of which remains unpublished.

== Life and career ==
Born in Montreal, Quebec, Gagnier was the son of clarinetist Joseph Gagnier and received his earliest musical training from him. His later teachers included violinists Saul Brant, Albert Chamberland, and Alfred De Sève. He had 26 siblings, many of whom also became professional musicians of note, including Armand Gagnier, Ernest Gagnier, Guillaume Gagnier, J.-J. Gagnier, Lucien Gagnier, and Réal Gagnier. A number of his nieces and nephews also became notable musicians, including Claire Gagnier, Ève Gagnier, Gérald Gagnier, and Roland Gagnier.

From 1918 to 1929, Gagnier served as the assistant conductor of Loew's Theatre in Montreal. He was also active as a violinist in a number of orchestras during the 1910s through the 1930s, including the Montreal Orchestra, the Little Symphony of Montreal, the CSM Orchestra, and a number of theatre orchestras. In 1936-1937 he was the second violinist in the Dubois String Quartet. As a euphonium player he performed for over 25 years with the Canadian Grenadier Guards Band, which was directed by his older brother J.-J.

In 1939, Gagnier moved to Trois-Rivières to assume the post of music director of the Union musicale de Trois-Rivières, a position he held for the next 11 years. During that time he also taught at the Académie de Trois-Rivières. He had previously taught at the Conservatoire de musique du Québec à Montréal and the Séminaire de Nicolet. He died in Trois-Rivières in 1951 at the age of 58.
