= Première vague =

- Directed by: Max Dufaud; Rémi Fréchette; Reda Lahmouid; Kevin T. Landry
- Written by: Max Dufaud; Rémi Fréchette; Reda Lahmouid; Kevin T. Landry; Jarrett Mann
- Produced by: Jarrett Mann
- Starring: Fayolle Jean Jr. Myranda Plourde; Marie-Sophie Roy; Mathieu Lorain Dignard
- Cinematography: Vincent Allard; Julien David; Soufiane Najah
- Edited by: Max Dufaud; Rémi Fréchette; Michel Giroux; Alexandra Oakley; Milène Ortenberg
- Music by: Pierre Desmarais
- Production company: Kino Montréal
- Release date: April 28, 2021 (RVQC)
- Running time: 75 minutes
- Country: Canada
- Language: French

Première vague ("First Wave") is a Canadian dramatic anthology film, which premiered in 2021. The first feature film ever produced by Kino Montréal, a filmmaking collective which otherwise specializes in short films, the film tells four interrelated stories about life in Montreal during the early days of the COVID-19 pandemic in 2020. The film was directed by Max Dufaud, Reda Lahmouid, Kevin T. Landry and Rémi Fréchette, with each of the directors writing and helming one of the four segments.

Daniel (Fayolle Jean Jr.), a delivery driver, becomes overwhelmed with work while caring for his sick father (Fayolle Jean). Fanny (Myranda Plourde), a young woman who has just recently moved to Montreal, finds herself becoming more fearful as her roommate ignores social distancing rules. Sex worker Marianne (Marie-Sophie Roy) watches her income dry up as her mother contracts COVID-19 in a nursing home. Samuel (Mathieu Lorain Dignard) slowly unravels in isolation after both losing his job and breaking up with his girlfriend. In addition to some interconnecting plot points between the four stories, the segments are also linked by footage of premier François Legault's real-life press conferences.

The film premiered on April 28, 2021 at the Rendez-vous Québec Cinéma, before opening commercially on May 14.
