= Édouard Woolley =

American opera singer

Édouard Joseph Woolley (31 March 1916 – 22 December 1991) was a Canadian tenor, actor, composer, and music educator of Haitian birth. He became a naturalized Canadian citizen in 1958. His compositional output includes masses for three voices and for four voices, a few songs, and some instrumental pieces. The section "Mazoumbel" from his suite for violin and piano Sous les palmiers (c. 1958) was performed in a concert of Haitian music in Montreal in 1979.

== Life and career ==
Born in Port-au-Prince, Woolley began his studies in his native city with Carmen Brouard (piano and harmony), Élisabeth de Pesquidoux-Mahy (singing), Werner Jaegerhuber (German opera/lieder), Raoul Nargys (acting), and Henriette Perret-Duplessis (singing). After working for a few years as a choirmaster at a church in Port-au-Prince, he moved to Montreal in 1938 at the age of 22 where he studied singing with Salvator Issaurel from the time of his arrival through 1944. He then entered the Conservatoire national de musique where he earned a Doctor of Music in 1947 after writing his thesis "La phonétique appliquée à l'art du chant". At the conservatoire he was an organ student of Eugène Lapierre and a piano pupil of Edmond Trudel.

In 1942 Woolley made his professional opera debut as Antonin in Reynaldo Hahn's Ciboulette at Les Variétés lyriques (LVL) in Montreal. That same year he began operating his own private voice studio which he ran for several decades. Among his notable students were Joseph Rouleau and André Turp. He was a principal artist at the LVL through 1947, spending five seasons performing leading roles in works like François Bazin's Le voyage en Chine and Oscar Straus's Drei Walzer. During the 1940s through the 1960s he performed as a singer and actor on a variety of CBC Radio and CBC Television programs and appeared in supporting roles on the dramatic stage and in Canadian films.

In 1948 Woolley founded the Opéra national du Québec, serving as the company's first artistic director through 1952. From 1967 until his retirement in 1981 he taught art history at the Cégep du Vieux Montréal. He served as the director of the Conservatoire national de musique from 1971 to 1975. He died in Miami in 1991 at the age of 75.
