= Albertine Caron-Legris =

Canadian composer (1906–1972)

Albertine Caron-Legris (1894–1972) was a Canadian pianist, composer and music educator. Many of her manuscripts and personal papers are held in the collection at the Library and Archives Canada.

== Early life ==
Born Albertine Caron in 1894, Caron-Legris received her musical training from the Sisters of the Assumption of the Blessed Virgin Mary in Louiseville and Nicolet. She later studied the piano and music composition with Eugène Lapierre at the Conservatoire national de musique, where she earned a Bachelor of Music degree in 1942.

== Career ==
Her catalogue comprises nearly 70 compositions, including art songs, piano works, sacred music, and harmonizations of traditional French-Canadian songs. She set texts by such authors as Blanche Lamontagne-Beauregard, Félix-Antoine Savard, Claude-Henri Grignon, Émile Nelligan, and Olivette Lamontagne.

Many of her pieces used folksong harmonizations. Her most well-known composition is the 1947 song La Berceuse de Donalda which was featured on both the radio and television version of the Canadian Broadcasting Corporation program Un Homme et son péché. In 1962, her collection of song melodies for piano, Mes Plus Belles Chansons, was published through a grant by the Canada Council. Her other works include Poème pastoral for the piano (composed 1942) and the songs Ceux qui s'aiment sont toujours malheureux (published 1947) and Soir d'hiver (published 1949). Some of her compositions were also published and submitted to competitions, among them Garde ton coeur, which received an award in the 1940 La Bonne Chanson competition. Her compositional work occupied a distinctive space at the intersection of the concert music world, French-Canadian literary traditions of terroir, and popular song.

During her lifetime, her works were included in the concert repertoires of Canadian musicians Maureen Forrester, Rose Goldblatt, Dorothy Pfeiffer, Raoul Jobin, Marthe Létourneau, Nicolas Massue and Albert Viau.

In 1972, Caron-Legris died in Montreal at the age of 77.
