= Charles Tanguy =

French composer and French horn player

Charles Tanguy (c. 1845 – 19??) was a French composer, French horn player, and music educator. His compositional output consists of several works for solo piano, numerous sentimental ballads, and a number of patriotic songs for the nation of Canada which were published in Le Passe-Temps. It is his patriotic music for which he is most well known, with his songs Canadien toujours! (1907, lyrics by Gaston Leury) and Patrie (1909, poem by Albert Ferland) being his most popular works.

== Life and career ==
Born in France, Tanguy earned a premier prix in the french horn from both the Académie de Valenciennes and the Conservatoire de Paris. He began his career playing the french horn in the Pasdeloup Orchestra and the house orchestra of the Théâtre Lyrique in Paris. During the Franco-Prussian War he played in a regimental band, first as a sergeant-bugler and then assuming the role of bandmaster. Following the war he played for the orchestra of the Théâtre-Italien in Paris and worked for a number of orchestras throughout Europe in countries like England, Scotland, Ireland, and Switzerland. He notably was the principal french hornist for the Opéra francais and with them toured to New Orleans in the early years of the 20th century. He was also active as a conductor for a number of French musical societies, both choral and instrumental.

Tanguy was active as a teacher of brass instruments, first working as a faculty member at the Conservatoire de Valenciennes. He was for a number of years the director of the Société chorale de St-Quentin, after which he taught on the faculty of the Conservatoire de Bordeaux. In 1907 he was appointed an officer of the Académie by the French government. That same year he immigrated to Canada where he worked in Montreal as an instructor in brass instruments, piano, singing, and violin. His notable students included J.-J. Gagnier and Guillaume Gagnier.
