= Joseph Rouleau =

Canadian opera singer

- Born: Joseph Alfred Pierre Rouleau; February 28, 1929; Matane, Quebec
- Died: July 12, 2019 (aged 90) Montreal, Quebec

Joseph A. Rouleau, CC GOQ (French pronunciation: [ʒozɛf ʁulo]; February 28, 1929 – July 12, 2019) was a French Canadian bass opera singer, particularly associated with the Italian and French repertoires.

== Life and career ==
Born in Matane, Quebec, he studied privately with Édouard Woolley and Albert Cornellier in Montreal, and at the Conservatoire de musique du Québec à Montréal with Martial Singher. In 1950–1951, Joseph participated in his first tour with Jeunesses Musicales Canada, of 40 concerts across the province of Québec.

He went to Milan, Italy, for complementary studies with Mario Basiola and Antonio Narducci. He sang small roles with the Opéra national du Québec, but his real debut was as Colline in La bohème, in New Orleans Opera, in 1955. He made his Opera Guild of Montreal debut as Philip II in Don Carlos (one of his greatest roles) in 1956. He also appeared in concert and on Canadian radio and television.

Engaged by the Royal Opera House in London, Rouleau sang with the company in Cardiff, Manchester, and Southampton prior to his London debut as Colline on 23 April 1957. Leading roles followed in over 40 productions there during the next 20 years. His Count Rodolfo in Bellini's La Sonnambula in 1960 with Joan Sutherland, led to a collaboration with the soprano which included his debut at the Paris Opéra that year as Raimondo in Lucia di Lammermoor and a 1965–66 Australian tour during which he won high praise particularly for his Assur in Rossini's Semiramide.

A consummate actor and musician, Rouleau sang a wide range of roles, he expanded his repertoire to include German and Russian roles, notably Titurel in Parsifal, and the lead in Boris Godunov. He also won considerable acclaim as Don Quichotte, and Mephistofeles in Faust. In 1976, he participated for the BBC, in a performance of the complete French version of Don Carlos, singing Philippe II.

He made his debut at the Metropolitan Opera on April 13, 1984, as the Grand Inquisitor in Don Carlos, under James Levine. From 1987 he appeared in concerts and recitals with accompanist Pierre Brabant. Many of their recitals together were devoted to the music of Félix Leclerc.

In 1977, Rouleau was made an officer of the Order of Canada, and was promoted to companion of the Order of Canada in 2010. In 1999, he was made an officer of the National Order of Quebec was promoted to grand officer in 2004. In 1990, he was awarded the Prix Denise-Pelletier award of the Prix du Québec. Rouleau was the recipient of a Governor General's Performing Arts Award for Lifetime Artistic Achievement in 2004. Rouleau was chosen as the mentor in the 2014 Governor General's Performing Arts Awards' Mentorship Program in which a mid-career artist is paired with a past Governor General's Performing Arts Awards recipient. The mentor and protégé learn from each other's experiences. Rouleau mentored tenor Jean-Philippe Fortier-Lazure.

He was also active as a teacher at the Université du Québec à Montréal, where he founded an opera workshop, in collaboration with soprano Colette Boky.

He died in Montreal on July 12, 2019.

== Selected recordings ==
- Semiramide – Joan Sutherland, Marilyn Horne, Joseph Rouleau, John Serge, Spiro Malas – Ambrosian Opera Chorus, London Symphony Orchestra, Richard Bonynge – DECCA (1965)
- Don Carlos – Edith Tremblay, Michèle Vilma, André Turp, Robert Savoie, Joseph Rouleau, Richard Van Allan – BBC Orchestra and Chorus, John Matheson – PONTO (1975)

== Sources ==
- The Encyclopedia of Music in Canada, Gilles Bryant, Florence Hayes, Gilles Potvin
