= Eugène Lapierre =

Canadian musician

- Born: June 8, 1899; Montreal, Canada
- Died: October 21, 1970 (aged 71); Montreal, Canada

Eugène Lapierre (8 June 1899 – 21 October 1970) was a Canadian organist, composer, journalist, writer on music, arts administrator, and music educator. He was awarded the King George V Silver Jubilee Medal in 1935 and the King George VI Coronation Medal in 1937. In 1963 he was named Chevalier of the Order of Malta and in 1966 he received the Bene merenti de patria from the Saint-Jean-Baptiste Society. He is the great-uncle of composer Yves Lapierre.

== Life and career ==
Born in Montreal, Lapierre received his earliest musical education at Saint Brigid's Church in his native city where he was a pupil of choirmaster Lucien Perreault. He then studied the organ with Étienne Guillet and worked as an accompanist at the Royal Military College Saint-Jean. He entered the École des Hautes Études Commerciales where he earned a degree in 1922.

From 1924–1928 Lapierre studied in Paris through a grant from the Canadian government, first at the Institut Grégorien where he earned a diploma in 1926 and then at the Schola cantorum where he earned a diploma in 1928. Among his teachers in Paris were Georges Caussade (composition), Vincent d'Indy (composition), Marcel Dupré (organ and improvisation), Simone Plé-Caussade (piano), and P. Sylva Hérard (piano). He went on to earn a diploma in journalism and Doctor of Music (1930) from the Université de Montréal, after which he worked as a journalist for La Patrie. While writing for that newspaper he continued to study the organ with Benoît Poirier.

During the 1920s and 1930s Lapierre served as organist for several churches in Montreal, including Saint-Philomène de Rosemont, Saint-Denis, and Saint-Jacques (1922-4 and 1928–36). From 1936–1944 he was organist at Saint-Stanislas-de-Kostka and from 1944–70 he served in that position at Saint-Alphonse-d'Youville. In 1921 he was appointed secretary of the Conservatoire national de musique and was later appointed the school's director in 1927, a post he held up until his death in 1970. Among his notable pupils are Gaston Allaire, Émilien Allard, Françoise Aubut, Pierre Brabant, Albertine Caron-Legris, Alfred Mignault, Colombe Pelletier, and Édouard Woolley.
