= François Héraly =

J. A. François Héraly (1856 – between 20 and 22 July 1920) was a Canadian clarinetist, bandmaster, and music educator of Belgian birth. Born in the small town of Flavin near Namur, Héraly began studying music privately in 1867 in Brussels. He entered the Namur Conservatory in 1873 where he was a member of the regimental band. In 1877 he matriculated to the Royal Conservatory of Liège and after completing his studies there directed bands in Belgium, France, Switzerland, and Algeria.

In 1894 Héraly emigrated to Canada where he remained for the rest of his life. There he met and married pianist and music teacher Ida Héraly (née Campbell). From 1894 to 1897 he was bandmaster for the Sherbrooke Band, after which he was active as a bandmaster in Montreal. In circa 1903 he became director of music at Sohmer Park and formed the St-Pierre-Apôtre parish Temperance Band whose membership included a young Wilfrid Pelletier among the drummers. He was also active as a woodwind teacher throughout his career and taught for a number of years on the faculty of the Conservatoire national de musique. Among his notable pupils was Paul Pratt. He died in Montreal in 1920.
