= Benoît Poirier =

Canadian organist, composer, and music educator

Benoît Fidèle Poirier
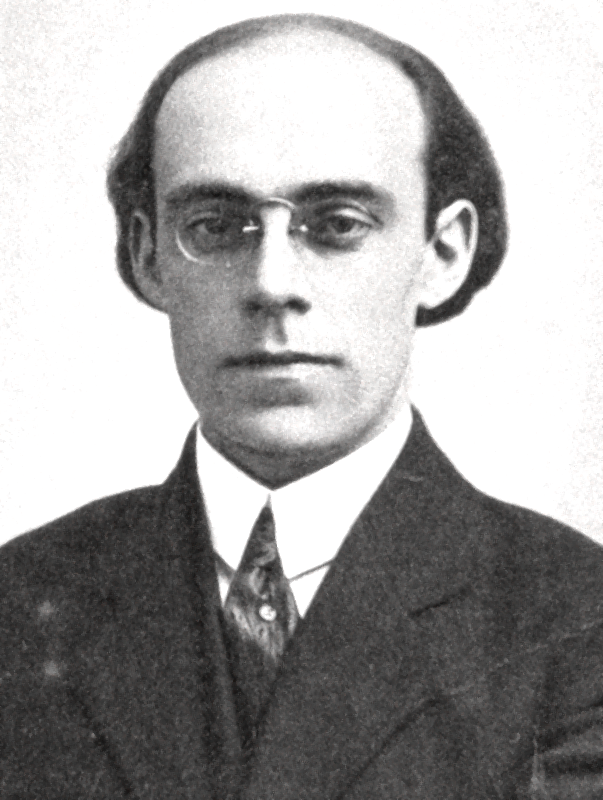
- Benoît Poirier in June 1910

Background information
- Born: October 17, 1882; Tignish, Prince Edward Island
- Died: October 7, 1965
- Occupations: Organist, composer, music educator

Benoît Poirier, OC (17 October, 1882 – 7 October, 1965) was a Canadian organist, composer and music educator.

Benoît Fidèle Poirier (17 October 1882 – 7 October 1965) was a Canadian organist, composer, and music educator. He was a church organist and taught at several educational and religious institutions in Montreal, Quebec. He created a number of compositions for organ and piano.

== Early life and education ==
Poirier was born Benjamin Perry in Tignish, Prince Edward Island. His parents were Laurence Poirier Perry & Emelia Margaret Desroches. His pipe organ study began when he was 13. He studied at the francophone University of St. Joseph's College, Memramcook, New Brunswick, from which he earned a Bachelor of Arts in 1902 and was granted an honorary Master of Arts in 1928. While an undergraduate there, he was also organist of St Thomas Church, Memramcook.

== Career ==
In 1903 Poirier relocated to Montreal to study for the priesthood. He taught at the Collège de Montréal and became the organist of the Séminaire de Philosophie. In 1919 he was elected to the board of the Schola cantorum, later serving as its president from 1923 to 1925. He was the director of the Conservatoire national de musique from 1923 to 1925 and also served on the school's board of examiners for many years. From 1921 to 1925 he taught at the Sacré-Coeur Convent, Sault-au-Récollet, Quebec. From 1953 to 1959 he was the director and principal teacher of the Conservatoire Royal de Montréal. His notable pupils included Eugène Lapierre and Alfred Tardif.

Pourier was organist at a number of churches in Montreal, including Ste-Hélène (1906), St. Patrick's Basilica, Montreal (1908), Saint-Vincent-de-Paul Church (1909), and St-Jacques Cathedral (1914). In 1921 he succeeded Joseph-Daniel Dussault as the organist at Notre-Dame Basilica, remaining in that post through 1954. During these years he regularly presented organ recitals.

Pourier created a number of compositions during his career, including several motets, patriotic songs, and works for solo piano and organ, the latter being most well-known.

He died in Laval, Quebec.

In 1978, Barry Waterlow performed two Radio Canada radio broadcasts of Poirier's organ music on the historic Louis Mitchell organ of Tignish, Prince Edward Island, the organ that inspired Poirier to become an organist.
