= Canada–Haiti relations =

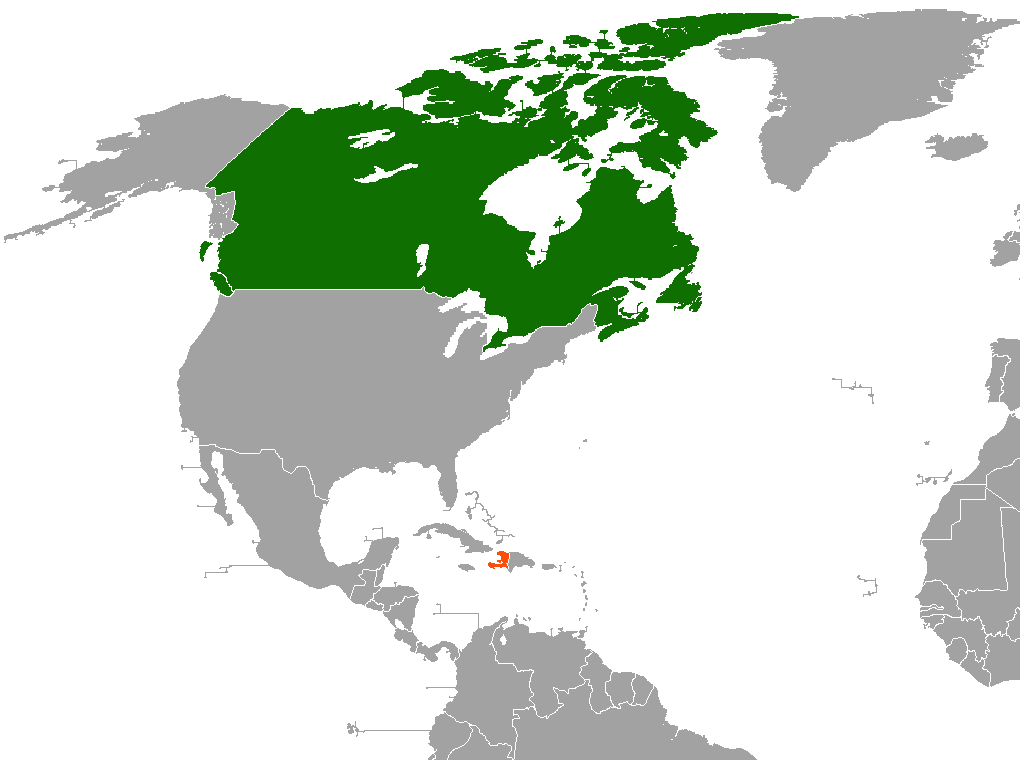

- Canada: Haiti

Diplomatic relations between Canada and Haiti were established in 1954. During the unsettled period from 1957 to 1990, Canada received many Haitian refugees, who now form a significant minority in Quebec. Canada participated in various international interventions in Haiti between 1994 and 2004, and continues to provide substantial aid to Haiti. Both nations are members of the Organisation internationale de la Francophonie, Organization of American States and the United Nations, and are the only independent French-speaking countries in the Americas.

== Historical background ==
Haiti is in the west of the island of Hispaniola. In 1797 Toussaint Louverture led an ultimately successful revolt against the French, and Haiti achieved independence in 1804. In the early 20th century, Haiti experienced significant political instability and continued to be burdened by foreign debt. These issues culminated in the United States occupation of the country via a brutal military regime lasting from 1915 to 1934.

Canada is a member of the Francophonie, or community of French-speaking countries, as is Haiti. Canada plays an active role in peacekeeping (or peacemaking) around the world. Quebec is an independent member of La Francophonie, with Haiti being the largest recipient of aid assistance from the province. Further, a large majority of the NGOs working in Haiti are Quebec organizations.

Canada and Haiti only officially established diplomatic relations in 1954, when Edward Ritchie Bellemare was appointed chargé d'affaires of the Canadian Embassy in Haiti. From 1957 to 1986, the Duvalier family reigned as dictators. They created the private army and terrorist death squads known as Tonton Macoutes. Many Haitians fled to exile in the United States and Canada, especially French-speaking Quebec. In the 1991 Canadian census, nearly 44,000 people described themselves as being of Haitian origin. By 2006, Canada had over 100,000 residents of Haitian origin.

=== Canadian operations in Haiti ===
A list of Canadian operations in Haiti follows:

- Operation HORATIO World Food Programme, September 2008
- Haiti 2004-4 December 2004
- Haiti 2004-3 October 2004
- Haiti 2004-2 October 2004
- Haiti 2004-1 September 2004
- Operation HAMLET United Nations Stabilization Mission in Haiti (MINUSTAH), August 2004–present
- Operation HALO MINUSTAH, March–August 2004
- Operation HALO Multinational Interim Force, February–July 2004
- Haiti 1999 December 1999
- Operation STANDARD June 1996 – July 1997
- Operation DIALOGUE January–December 1994
- Operation CAULDRON September 1993 – June 1996
- Operation FORWARD ACTION October 1993 – September 1994
- Haiti 1989 January–October 1989
- Operation BANDIT January–February 1988
- Haiti 1963 May 1963

== 1993 international intervention ==
Following the overthrow of the Duvalier regime, Haiti went through a period of political and economic turmoil. UN sponsored forces repeatedly intervened in an attempt to stabilize the situation. The Canadian government refused to recognize the 1988 Haitian national elections, which were marred by violence that left at least 34 people dead, and stated they were thinking of cutting $15 million in development aid.

Though government bilateral aid had plunged, Haiti was still seeing aid from Canada in the form of NGO bilateral assistance. For a brief 10-month period beginning in December 1990, Canada reinstated significant aid efforts in light of Jean-Bertrand Aristide being democratically elected as Prime Minister and promising to protect the fundamental human rights of his people. The aid was again revoked when Aristide fled the country after a coup d'état the next year. Canada chose to even discontinue NGO bilateral aid after Aristide fled, leaving only food aid and basic need assistance able to continue in the Caribbean nation. Political chaos ensued. In June 1993, Prime Minister Brian Mulroney of Canada told President Bill Clinton that Canada was ready to send troops to enforce a blockade around Haiti. Canada's decision to intervene in Haiti in this time period was largely propelled by the demands and concerns of the Haitian-Francophonie population living in Quebec at the time. Later that year, Canada assisted in the United Nations Mission in Haiti, a peacekeeping operation carried out by the United Nations between September 1993 and June 1996.

The Force Commander from March to June 1996, Brigadier-General J.R.P. Daigle was Canadian. Daigle continued as commander of the United Nations Support Mission in Haiti (1996–1997), and the Canadian Général Robin Gagnon led the subsequent United Nations Transition Mission in Haiti (1997). Canada also provided the Police Commissioners between October 1993 and February 1996, and contributed police officers to the United Nations Civilian Police Mission in Haiti (1997–2000).

In 2000, with Haiti more stable, Jean-Bertrand Aristide was again elected, although his second term of office was marked by accusations of corruption.

== 2004 international intervention ==
In February 2004, the presidency of Jean-Bertrand Aristide came to an end amid a rebellion. The Multinational Interim Force (MIF) was authorized by the UN Security Council to deploy in Haiti immediately to keep the peace. Of the 2,700 troops initially deployed, Canada contributed 125. By April, the Canadian contingent led by Lt.-Col. Jim Davis had risen to 500.

Recent reports detailing sexual abuse against Haitian civilians by UN peacekeepers following the 2004 intervention have implicated the MIF. Allegations have ranged from the use of sexual harassment by peacekeepers to coerce the population in the midst of the political unrest, to outright abuse and exploitation during the period of political turmoil.

Despite Canada’s participation in the post-rebellion peacekeeping mission, Haiti’s illegal prostitution industry grew. During this period, there were many cases of MIF-associated peacekeepers exploiting their newfound authority in the region to systematically sexually abuse Haitians. In February 2005, three Pakistani peacekeepers were accused, and later court martialed, for the sexual abuse of a young girl.

The United Nations Stabilization Mission in Haiti was established later in 2004 as a successor to the MIF. Since then, Canadian contributions have been limited to a 100 police officers and a small number of liaison officers. In June 2005, the Canadian government warned Canadians to avoid visiting Haiti due to the increasingly deteriorating security situation.

The United Nations Stabilization Mission in Haiti (MINUSTAH) had a total of 14 allegations of sexual exploitation and abuse (SEA) against MINUSTAH personnel in 2014. An inquiry conducted by the United Nations in 2015 found that the actual number of SEA interactions by MINUSTAH personnel was 231.

Beginning in roughly 2004, Canada's aid program implemented what is known as a whole-of-government approach that aimed to develop and support the transitional government. More money was being spent on state services such as public security and election processes. In 2006 Canada assisted in international efforts to help Haiti complete its first full electoral cycle since its constitution entered into force in 1987. The Government of Canada through the Canadian International Development Agency contributed nearly $40 million for the electoral process, providing observers and technical assistance. The Governor General of Canada, Michaelle Jean (herself of Haitian origin) attended the inauguration of President Rene Preval on May 14, 2006, as the Canadian representative.

In July 2007, Canadian Prime Minister Stephen Harper visited Haiti, including a visit to a Canadian-funded hospital in the crime-ridden Cite Soleil slum.

== Current situation ==
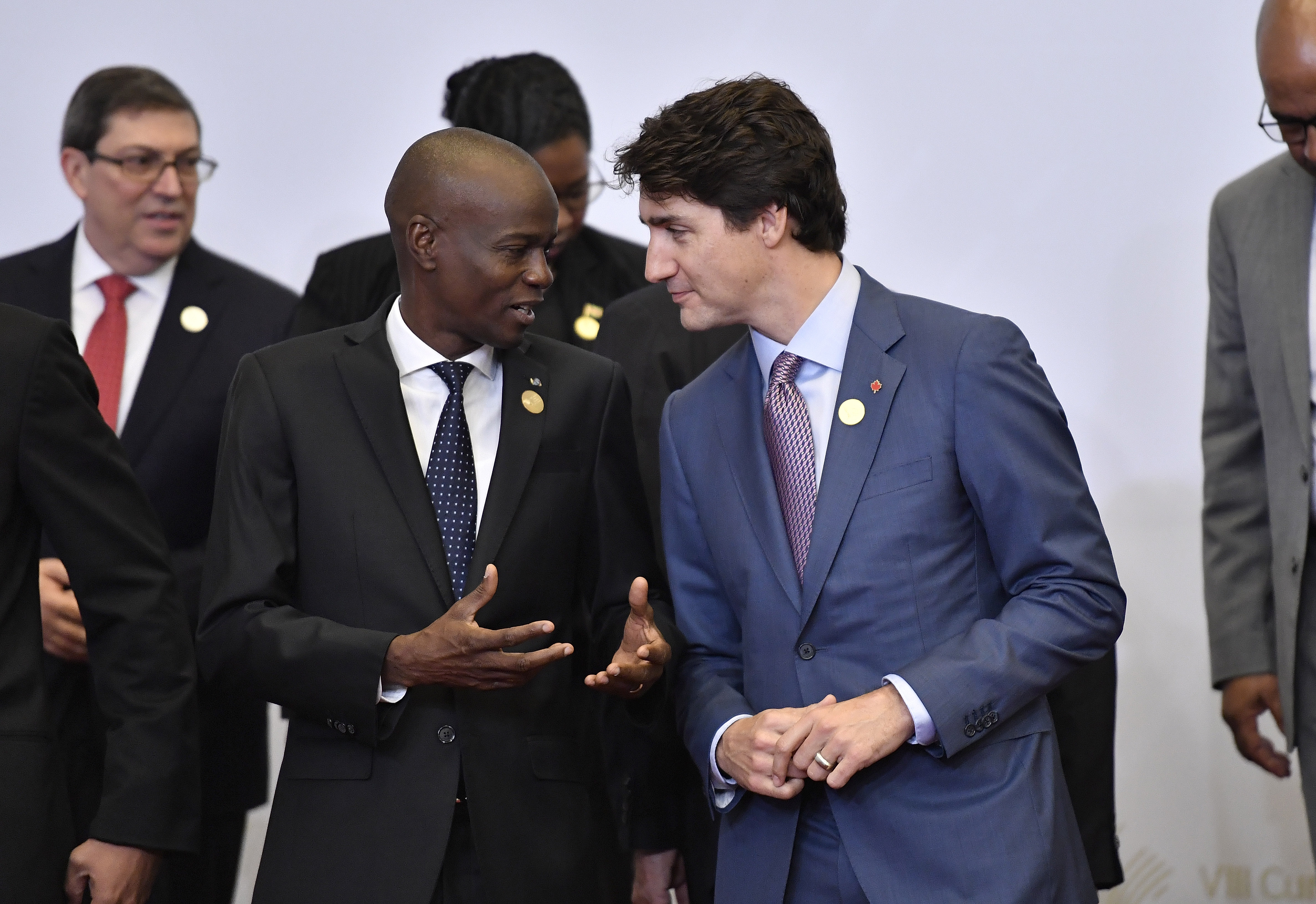
Canadian Prime Minister Justin Trudeau and Haitian President Jovenel Moïse during the 8th Summit of the Americas in Lima, Peru; April 2018.

Haiti is considered a fragile state under the Canadian definition of the concept, as the government does not provide basic services to its citizens. CIDA has created a development plan for nations it deems as fragile states, specifically Haiti, Afghanistan, Sudan formerly unified, and the West Bank and Gaza Strip called the New Deal. The New Deal was implemented to provide further support in helping the fragile states reach the MDGs for 2015. The New Deal includes goals such as security, jobs, revenue, and justice. Despite this, there is much controversy over how Canada's aid money is being spent and who it is being handed over to. Though CIDA has outlined good governance as one of its priorities, NGOs have been providing over 80% of the basic services in Haiti, thus receiving a large part of the Canadian aid money. By avoiding interaction with the Haitian government, Canada has promoted a parallel system of services in lieu of the state providing these services.

A large number of Canadian development workers are present in Haiti, including hundreds of missionaries working primarily in the health and education sectors.

As of 2008, Canada had committed $555 million to Haiti over five years. Haiti became the top recipient of Canadian development aid in 2009, with Afghanistan falling into the second recipient position. $334 million total dollars in aid money was given to Haiti in 2009. In February 2009, the Canadian government announced it will focus foreign aid on 20 countries or regions where it hopes to have a bigger impact, including Haiti. In addition to official aid, Haitian immigrants in Canada sent about $248 million of remittances to their families in Haiti in 2006. After the destructive earthquake that Haiti experienced in 2010, $221 million in citizen and private donations was raised for Haiti. CIDA then matched that amount in contributions. In January 2013, Canada's Minister of International Cooperation, Julian Fantino, announced that the government would be reviewing the aid being remitted to Haiti, citing concerns regarding the results of the use of the funds. Some of these concerns were expressed by Haitian Prime Minister Laurent Lamothe, who also suggested that the Canadian government give more say and more aid to the Haitian government directly.

There remains a security warning from the government of Canada to exercise caution when travelling to the country, however there is not presently an advisory in effect for Haiti.

In January 2020, Canadian Foreign Minister, François-Philippe Champagne, issued a statement in remembrance for the 10th anniversary of Haiti's earthquake.

== Resident diplomatic missions ==
- Canada maintains an embassy in Port-au-Prince.
- Haiti maintains an embassy in Ottawa and a consulate-general in Montreal.

== See also ==
- Haitian Canadians
- List of Haitian Canadians
