= François Morel (composer) =

François Morel CQ
- Born: 14 March 1926; Montreal, Quebec, Canada
- Died: 14 January 2018 (aged 91)
- Genres: Classical
- Occupations: Composer, pianist, conductor, music educator
- Instrument: Piano

François Morel (14 March 1926 – 14 January 2018) was a Canadian composer, pianist, conductor, and music educator. An associate of the Canadian Music Centre, he was made a Knight of the National Order of Quebec in 1994 and was awarded the Prix Denise-Pelletier in 1996. He has had his works premiered by the CBC Symphony Orchestra, the Montreal Symphony Orchestra, and the Philadelphia Orchestra.

== Life and career ==
Born in Montreal, Morel studied at the Conservatoire de musique du Québec à Montréal from 1944 to 1953. His teachers included Claude Champagne (composition), Isabelle Delorme (harmony, counterpoint, fugue), Gérald Gagnier (conducting), Arthur Letondal (piano), Germaine Malépart, Jean Papineau-Couture (acoustics), and Edmond Trudel (piano). He was a founding member of the Canadian League of Composers in 1951. From 1956 to 1979 he worked for CBC Radio as a composer of incidental music, music consultant, and researcher.

Morel taught music analysis and composition at the Institut Nazareth from 1959 to 1961. In 1972 he was appointed director of the Académie de musique du Québec, a position he held through 1978. From 1976 to 1979 he taught at the Bourgchemin Cegep in Drummondville and from 1979 to 1997 he taught at Université Laval. He also served on the faculty of the Université de Montréal in 1979–1980. His work for guitar Me duele España, played by and written for guitarist Michael Laucke, was recorded on the Radio Canada International label (RCI 457) and won the Grand Prix du Disque of the Canadian Music Council in 1979 for the best Canadian recording.

He is among the first Quebec musicians to be trained exclusively at the CMM. From 1944 to 1953 he studied composition with Claude Champagne, acoustics with Jean Papineau-Couture, harmony, counterpoint and fugue with Isabelle Delorme and piano with Arthur Letondal, Germaine Malépart and Edmond Trudel.

== Compositions ==
- Esquisse, op.1 (1946)
- Chants japonais - for voice and piano (1949)
- Quatuor à cordes no.1 (1952)
- Antiphonie - for orchestra (1953)
- Prière - for organ (1953)
- Cassation - for septet à vent (commissioned by de Radio-Canada, 1954)
- Deux études de sonorités - for piano (1954)
- Les rivages perdus - for voice and piano (1954)
- Dyptique - for wind instruments and percussion (1954)
- Symphonie pour cuivres (commissioned by Radio-Canada, 1956)
- Rituel de l'espace - for orchestra (commissioned by Radio-Canada, 1959)
- Boréal - for orchestra (commissioned by The Montreal Symphony Orchestra, 1959)
- L'étoile noire - tombeau de Borduas, for orchestra (1961)
- Le mythe de la roche percée (commissioned by Pittsburg wind orchestra, 1961)
- Quintette pour cuivre (commissioned by Quintette de Montréal, 1962)
- Quatuor à cordes no.2 (commissioned by Canadian Broadcasting corporation, 1963)
- Alleluia, for organ (commissioned by Ars organi, 1964)
- Requiem for wind instruments (1966)
- Nuvattuq (solo flute, 1967), recorded around 1975 on album "Solo" (Various Artists) on Radio Canada International (RCI 409), flute by Jean C. Morin.
- Neumes d'espaces et reliefs (commissioned by Edmonton Orchestra, 1967)
- Prismes anamorphoses (commissioned by Canadian Broadcasting corporation, Vancouver, 1967)
- Étude en forme de toccate (for two percussion instruments, 1968)
- Départs (commissioned for guitar and orchestra, McGill Chamber Orchestra, 1969), recorded on RCI 367, guitare Michael Laucke
- Radiance (commissioned by Canadian Broadcasting Corporation Vancouver, 1970)
- Rythmologue, pour 8 percussions (1970)
- Iikkii, froidure (commissioned by the Société de musique contemporaine du Québec, 1971), guitar and chamber orchestra\, recorded on RCI 367, Michael Laucke, guitar
- Me duele España - for guitar (commissioned by the Guitar Society Toronto, Michael Laucke)(1977)
- Melisma, pièce concertante for piano and orchestra (*The Montreal Symphony Orchestra Competition Award, 1980)
- L'oiseau-demain, flute ensemble (1982)
- Aux marges du silence (commissioned by Laval University, 1982)
- Divergences, violin and guitar (1983), recorded on RCI 583, Michael Laucke, guitar
- Taléa, wind trio (1984)
- Fulgurance no.1, for small ensemble (1986)
- Aerea, brass and percussion (1986)
- Lyre de cristal, hommage to Varèse, for percussion instruments (commissioned by University McGill, 1986)
- Les voix de l'ombre, for brass (1987)
- Aux couleurs du ciel, for orchestra (commissioned by the Montréal, 1988)
- Duolet, for two flutes (1988)
- De subitement Lointain, for wind ensemble (1989)
- Fulgurance no.2, for small ensemble (1990)
- Paysage dépaysé, for string quintet (commissioned by the Canadian Broadcasting Corporation, 1990)
- Figures-Segments-Ellipses, clarinet and string quartet (commissioned by Laval University, 1990)
- Distance intime, for flute and piano (commissioned by Musique of Canada competition, 1991)
- Stèle for clarinet (commissioned by Musique of Canada competition, 1991)
- Die stelle der Zwillinge, hommage to Paul Klee (commissioned by Laval Orchestra, 1992)
- Lumières sculptées, pour cuivres et percussions (commissioned by the Société de musique contemporaine du Québec, 1992)
- Eklepsis, for marimba (1993)
- Chants d'espace (commissioned by Orchestre symphonique de Québec, 1994)
- Les Éphémères, for 4 horns and tuba (1995)
- Et le crépuscule.... se trouva libre (commissioned by the Orchestre symphonique de Trois-Rivières, 1996)
- Strophes, séquences, mouvements, for 12 saxophones (1999)
- Imaginaire, 3 pieces for guitar (2000)
- Les récits du rêve, for 2 pianos-left hand and orchestra (commissioned by Festival de Lanaudière, 2000)
- Miroir, solo bassoon (2001)
- Rupture, for orchestra (commissioned by de l'Orchestre symphonique de Québec, 2001)
- Calligraphies sonores, ensemble à vent et percussions (2002)
- Il faut inventer la terre (commissioned by de l'Orchestre symphonique de Trois-Rivières, 2003)
- Rencontre Aria, tuba and piano (2004)
- Passage à l'aube, for orchestra (commissioned by The Montreal Symphony Orchestra, 2005)
- Aulos, solo oboe (2007)
- Signal, solo flute (2007)
- Phases, for horn and piano (2008)
- Parcours for4 percussions (2009)
- Trinomes, piano solo (2011)
- Enjeux, piano solo (2013)
- Visions, piano solo (commissioned by Musique du Canada competition, 2014)
- La vie (titre provisoire) (2016)

== Awards ==
- 1947 : Lauréat de piano, from Académie de musique du Québec
- 1953 : Premier Prix de fugue, from Conservatoire de musique de Montréal
- 1979 : Grand Prix du Disque from the Canadian Music Council in 1979 for the best Canadian recording
- 1994 : Chevalier of the Ordre national du Québec
- 1996 : Denise-Pelletier Award one of the Prix du Québec
- 2003 : Prix Serge-Garant, par la Fondation Émile-Nelligan
- 2013 : Prix Hommage, Prix Opus
