= Lakay Nou =

Canadian comedy television series

- Genre: Sitcom
- Created by: Frédéric Pierre
- Written by: Frédéric Pierre; Catherine Souffront Darbouze; Angelo Cadet
- Directed by: Ricardo Trogi
- Starring: Frédéric Pierre; Catherine Souffront Darbouze; Fayolle Jean; Mireille Métellus
- Composer: Frédéric Bégin
- Country of origin: Canada
- No. of seasons: 3
- No. of episodes: 30

Production
- Producer: Frédéric Pierre
- Production locations: Montreal, Quebec
- Editor: Guillaume Choquette
- Production company: Productions Jumellage

Original release
- Network: Ici Radio-Canada Télé
- Release: January 18, 2024 – present

Lakay Nou (meaning "Our Home" in Haitian Creole) is a Canadian television comedy series, which premiered in 2024 on Ici Radio-Canada Télé. The series stars Frédéric Pierre and Catherine Souffront Darbouze as Henri Honoré and Myrlande Prospère, a married couple in Montreal who are torn between the traditional expectations of their Haitian immigrant parents and their modern lifestyle as parents of teenagers who consider themselves fully québécois rather than Haitian.

It is noted as the first television series ever made in Quebec with a majority Black Canadian core cast.

== Premise ==
Henri, whose parents Frank (Fayolle Jean) and Rose (Mireille Métellus) live in the other half of the same duplex, has been running the used bookstore previously owned by his father, while Myrlande is a Crown attorney. In the first episode of the series, Henri receives news from his landlord Steve (François Chénier) that the store will be evicted from its longtime location due to Steve's plans to demolish the building; after struggling to get his father to accept the news, he decides to simply close the bookstore, whose business has been rapidly dwindling in the era of online bookshopping, and instead chase his own deferred dream of opening a Haitian cuisine restaurant. Meanwhile, Myrlande struggles with whether or not to accept a new job with a corporate law firm where she will have to defend clients associated with organized crime, but will make significantly more money than she does as a public prosecutor, and thus will be able to properly support the family through the upheaval in Henri's career.

The cast also includes Catherine-Audrey Volcy, Stanley Exantus and Kiara Gaudin as Henri and Myrlande's children Judeline, Jude and Malia, Marcel Joseph and Yardly Kavanagh as Myrlande's parents Parnel and Célestine, Maxime de Cotret as Myrlande's law colleague Guillaume-Félix Tanguay-Boucher, and Richardson Zéphir as Moïse, the priest of the family's church.

Through the first season, storylines include Henri's challenges in getting the restaurant up and running, Myrlande's increasing ethical discomfort with representing mobsters, Judeline coming out as lesbian soon after starting university studies in music, and Jude's desire to drop out of school and devote his time to becoming a social media content creator and influencer.

== Production ==
It was created by Pierre, and directed by Ricardo Trogi. According to Pierre, he had been interested in creating a television series centred on Quebec's Haitian community for a number of years, but faced indifference from the industry due to a perception that the concept would not appeal to mainstream audiences in Quebec, until finding a more receptive audience for his pitch following the George Floyd protests in 2020 and the resulting conversations about institutional racism. Pierre noted that TVA had previously had significant ratings success with dubbed versions of African-American television shows such as Diff'rent Strokes and The Cosby Show, thus proving that the province's television audience could be much more receptive to Black-themed shows than the television industry was giving them credit for.

Writers of the series include Pierre, Souffront Darbouze, Angelo Cadet and Marie-Hélène Lebeau Taschereau.

Pierre launched his own production firm, Productions Jumelage, to produce the series and other works highlighting people of colour in the province.

== Distribution ==
The series was launched in January 2024 on Radio-Canada's Ici TOU.TV streaming platform, before premiering on the terrestrial network in April.

A second season was released to TOU.TV in January 2025, with terrestrial broadcast again planned for the spring, and a third season was released in 2026.

The first season was also added, in a version with English language subtitles, to the CBC Gem platform in 2025.
