= Fayolle Jean Jr. =

Haitian-Canadian actor

Fayolle Jean Jr. is a Haitian Canadian actor from Montreal, Québec, best known for his television roles as Valère in Entre deux draps and Jeff Bourjoly in Escouade 99.

He had a small bit part in the 2002 film North Station (Station-Nord) before being cast in his first major television role as goalie Alex Beauchesne in Lance et compte in 2004, and had his first major leading film role in the 2015 film Scratch. In 2022 he played the doctor in Sainte-Marie-la-Mauderne, a stage adaptation of the film Seducing Doctor Lewis (La Grande séduction).

His father, Fayolle Jean, is also an actor. The two have acted together in the films Scratch and Première vague.
