= Germaine Malépart =

Canadian pianist, educator

- Born: July 7, 1898; Laval, Quebec
- Died: April 19, 1963 (aged 64); Montreal, Canada
- Education: Conservatoire de Paris
- Occupations: Pianist, educator

Germaine Malépart (July 7, 1898 – April 19, 1963) was a Canadian pianist and music educator.

She was born in Saint-Vincent-de-Paul (now Laval, Quebec) and began taking piano lessons with Arthur Letondal at the age of 7. When she was 13, she performed for the Ladies' Morning Musical Club in Montreal. In 1917, she won the Prix d'Europe and, in 1920, she received a scholarship from the Ladies' Morning Musical Club. Malépart studied five years at the Conservatoire de Paris with Isidor Philipp, Maurice Amour and Roland Broche. After her return to Montreal, she toured throughout Canada and the United States and performed on radio.

In 1942, she began teaching at the École supérieure de musique d'Outremont and at the Conservatoire de musique du Québec à Montréal. Her students included Lise Boucher, Andrée Desautels, Pierre Hétu, Claude Lagacé, Mireille Lagacé, François Morel, Renée Morisset, Claude Savard, William Stevens, Gilles Tremblay and Ronald Turini.

Malépart died in Montreal at the age of 64.
