= Werner Jaegerhuber =

Haitian composer (1900–1953)

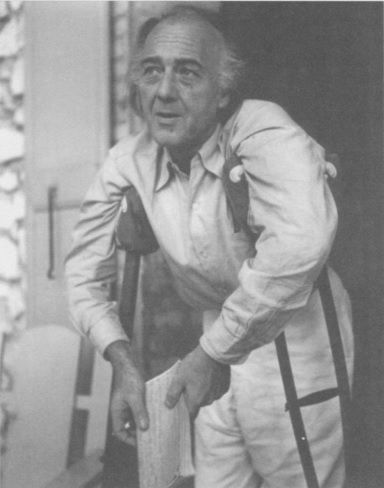
- Werner A. Jaegerhuber
- Born: Werner Anton Jaegerhuber; 17 March 1900; Port-au-Prince, Haiti
- Died: 20 May 1953 (aged 53); Pétion-Ville, Haiti
- Occupation: Composer
- Parent(s): Anton Jaegerhuber; Anna Maria Tippenhauer

Werner Anton Jaegerhuber (17 March 1900 – 20 May 1953) was a Haitian composer known for composing "Messe sur les Airs Vodouesques", "Musique pour Aieules", "Naissa" and many others.

Born in Port-au-Prince, Haiti, Jaegerhuber was the son of Anton Jaegerhuber, a naturalized American citizen of German origin and Anna Maria Tippenhauer, a member of a mulatto Haitian family. Jaegerhuber studied at the former Voigt Conservatory of Hamburg in Germany from 1915 to 1922, staying in Germany for further study until 1937 when he returned to Haiti. He stayed away for roughly the duration of the US occupation of Haiti. Jaegerhuber later went on to compose classical music and operas. His interest in peasant music made a major contribution to the world of music by combining traditional Haitian folkloric music with classical European music.

== Death ==
Jaegerhuber died in Pétion-Ville, Haiti on 20 May 1953.
