= Gaynier =

Gaynier may refer to:

- Oswald J. Gaynier (1915-1942), a United States Navy officer and Navy Cross recipient
- USS Gaynier (DE-751), a United States Navy destroyer escort cancelled in 1944
