= J.-J. Gagnier =

Canadian musician

Jean-Josaphat Gagnier (2 December 1885 – 16 September 1949) was a Canadian conductor, composer, clarinetist, bassoonist, pianist, arts administrator, and music educator. His compositional output mainly consists of works for orchestra and band, although he did write some choral pieces, songs, works for solo piano and organ, some incidental music for the theatre, and a work for solo harp. His compositions are written in a wide variety of styles from romanticism to impressionism to 20th century idioms.

== Life and career ==
Born in Montreal, Gagnier was the son of clarinetist Joseph Gagnier and received his earliest musical training on that instrument from him. His other clarinet teachers included Oscar Arnold, Léon Medaer, Louis van Loocke, and Jacques Vanpoucke. He studied the bassoon with Émile Barbot and Carl Westermeier, the piano with Alexis Contant and Romain-Octave Pelletier I, and theory with Contant, Orpha-F. Deveaux, Romain Pelletier, and Charles Tanguy. He had 26 siblings, many of whom also became professional musicians of note; including Armand Gagnier, Ernest Gagnier, Guillaume Gagnier, Lucien Gagnier, Réal Gagnier, and René Gagnier. A number of his nieces and nephews also became notable musicians, including Claire Gagnier, Ève Gagnier, and Gérald Gagnier, and his son Roland Gagnier was a successful bassoonist.

Gagnier began working as a professional musician at the age of 14, performing in orchestras and bands in theaters in Montreal and with his father in the orchestra at Sohmer Park. By 1904 he was conducting his own choirs and bands at just 18 years of age. In the 1905–1906 season he, along with his father, became a bassoonist in J.-J. Goulet's Montreal Symphony Orchestra, following the ensemble's unsuccessful attempt to acquire two bassoonists among the city's other musicians. He founded the Montreal Concert Band (also known as the Concordia) in 1910, a band he directed for the next several years.

In 1911-1912 Gagnier played in the orchestra and served as assistant conductor for the Montreal Opera Company. His work with this company led to his meeting arts patron and impresario Frank Stephen Meighen who was highly impressed by Gagnier's talent. Meighen appointed him director of the Canadian Grenadier Guards Band in 1913 with the rank of captain in the Canadian Army; a position he held through 1947. In 1917 he became music director of the Sohmer Park Concert Band, a post he held for three years.

During the 1920s and 1930s, Gagnier worked frequently as a guest conductor throughout Canada and the United States, notably working on a number occasions with the famous Goldman Band. He conducted a number of opera performances for theatres in St-Denis and Français in 1921. In 1920 he founded the Little Symphony of Montreal which he directed through 1931. From 1927 to 1929 he conducted the Montreal Symphony Orchestra (no relation to the current orchestra of that name). In the summer of 1933 he organized a special concert of un-published works by Calixa Lavallée at the Lafontaine Gardens upon the occasion of Lavallée's remains being moved from Boston to Montreal. The music presented was the result of Gagnier's unearthing of original scores by Lavallée held in private collections and libraries. In 1942 he founded the Gagnier Woodwind Quintet which consisted of four of his brothers and his son. He directed the ensemble until bad health forced him to resign in 1949.

In the 1930s and 1940s Gagnier was active conducting for radio, beginning with a series of 26 concerts in 1931 with the Canadian Grenadier Guards Band for CBS Radio in the United States. From 1934 until his death in Montreal in 1949 he worked as the director of CBC Radio in Montreal and was an employee of CRBC. For them he not only coordinated and chose programs, but also served as a conductor for broadcasts of opera, orchestral, and band concerts. For the CBC he compiled the first catalogue of musical compositions by Canadian composers which was issued by the CBC in mimeograph in 1947.

Gagnier was active as a teacher throughout his career, taking on a number of private students. He also was a faculty member at both Mont-St-Louis College and the Collège de Montréal from 1925 to 1930. He also was an instructor at the Conservatoire national de musique, the McGill University, and the Dominion College of Music. He himself earned a Doctor of Music from the Université de Montréal in 1934. He also gave numerous guest lectures and published several articles, essays, and poems; many of which appeared in Le Passe-Temps.
