= Regenia Gagnier =

English language and literature scholar

Regenia Gagnier FBA (b. 24 June 1953) is a scholar of Victorian and modern British literature, the geopolitics of language and literature migration, world literatures and political economy, and Professor of English at the University of Exeter.

== Biography ==
Gagnier was Professor of English at Stanford University from 1982-1996 and Professor of English at the University of Exeter since 1996. She received a Guggenheim Fellowship in 1991. She was elected as a Fellow of the Academy of Europe in 2014 and as a Fellow of the British Academy in 2020. She is also a Fellow of St Catherine's College, Oxford.

== Select publications ==
- Gagnier, R. 1986. Idylls of the Marketplace: Oscar Wilde and the Victorian Public. Stanford University Press.
- Gagnier, R. 1991. Subjectivities: A History of Self-Representation in Britain 1832-1920. Oxford University Press.
- Gagnier, R. 2000. The Insatiability of Human Wants: Economics and Aesthetics in Market Society. University of Chicago Press.
- Gagnier, R. 2010. Individualism, Decadence and Globalization: On the Relationship of Part to Whole, 1859–1920. Palgrave Macmillan.
- Gagnier, R. 2018. Literatures of Liberalization: Global Circulation and the Long Nineteenth Century. Palgrave Macmillan.
