= Alice Vinette =

Canadian composer, organist and nun (1894–1989)

Alice Vinette (24 April 1894 - 17 March 1989) was a Canadian composer, organist, and nun. Her religious name was Sister Marie-Jocelyne.

Vinette was born in Saint-Urbain, Quebec. She studied piano with Romain Octave Pelletier I, organ with Raoul Paquet, composition with Rodolphe Mathieu and Auguste Descarries, and singing with Fleurette Contant. Vinette joined the Sisters of Saint Anne in 1917 as Sister Marie-Jocelyne, a contemporary of composer Lydia Boucher (Sister Marie-Therese). She taught theory, voice, piano, and organ at the school run by the Sisters of Saint Anne.

== Selected compositions ==
=== Piano ===
- Prelude

=== Voice ===
- Messe Breve (three voices)
- Si tu savais le don de Dieu
