= Carmen Brouard =

Haitian-Canadian pianist, composer and music educator

Carmen Brouard (February 10, 1909 – December 11, 2005) was a Haitian-Canadian pianist, composer and music educator. She was considered the most accomplished Haitian composer of her time.

The daughter of Raphaël Brouard, mayor of Port-au-Prince, and Cléomine Gaëtjens, who gave Brouard her first lessons on the piano, she was born in Port-au-Prince. Her brother was the Haitian poet Carl Brouard. At a young age, she moved to France with her family, where she continued her studies with the masters at the Conservatoire de Paris. She continued her studies on the piano with Justin Elie and his wife Lily Price. Brouard gave her first public performance at the café-chantant Parisiana in Paris. She also trained with Isidore Philipp. She gave her first concert at the Parisiana in October 1929. When she returned to Port-au-Prince, she began teaching music there. Her pupils included the composer and singer Édouard Woolley.

She returned to France where she pursued further studies in music with Marguerite Long; through Long, she became friends with the composer Maurice Ravel. Brouard went back to Haiti during the 1940s, returning to France one more time around 1955. In 1956, she was admitted to the Faculté des lettres de Paris.

Brouard moved to Quebec in 1977; she became a Canadian citizen in 1981. With Claude Dauphin, she founded the Société de Recherches et de Diffusion de la Musique Haïtienne. She died in Montreal at the age of 96.

She married Jean Magloire; the couple later divorced. Their daughter Nadine became a writer.
