= Frédéric Pierre (actor) =

Canadian actor

Frédéric Pierre (born July 27, 1972) is a Canadian actor from Quebec of Haitian descent. He is most noted for his starring role as Renaud Magloire in the crime drama series Alertes, for which he won the Gémeaux Award for Best Actor in a Drama Series in 2024, and as the creator and star of the comedy series Lakay Nou.

Pierre launched his own production firm, Productions Jumelage, to produce Lakay Nou and other works highlighting people of colour in Quebec.
