= Benoît Verdickt =

Canadian organist (1884–1970)

Benoît Verdickt (27 September 1884 – 28 April 1970) was a Canadian organist, choirmaster, composer, and music educator of Belgian birth. His compositional output consists mainly of sacred music, some of which he self-published. His most notable works are his Cantique de mariage for soloist and two-part choir (1918) and his Missa pro defunctis for three-part choir and organ (1941).

== Early life ==
Born in Steenhuffel, Londerzeel, Verdickt studied in Mechelen, first at the Interdiocesan School of Sacred Music, and then at the Mechelen Conservatory where he ultimately graduated with his diploma.

== Career ==
In 1906 Verdickt immigrated to Canada to assume a church organist post in Victoriaville, Quebec. He remained there until 1912 when he became an organist/choirmaster at a church in Rochester, New York in the United States. After just one year there, he returned to Canada in 1913 to assume a similar role at Sts-Anges Church in Lachine, Quebec near Montreal. He remained there until his retirement in 1963.

Verdickt was active as a music teacher while living in Lachine. He taught on the music faculty of the Conservatoire national de musique, taught solfège for the Quebec government, and served as the Lachine school board's director of music education. He also had a number of private students. Among his notable pupils was Gustave Robitaille. He also conducted Lachine's local concert band and organized concerts in the town. At the time of his death in Saint-Laurent, Quebec in 1970 the newspaper Messager de Lachine stated, "There are many among us who owe their taste and musical training to him. For that reason he will always remain a prominent figure in the history of Lachine". The Lachine Museum named one of their pavilions in his honor. A gallery in the Musée de Lachine is named for him.
