= Wilfrid Pelletier =

Canadian musician and arts administrator (1896–1982)

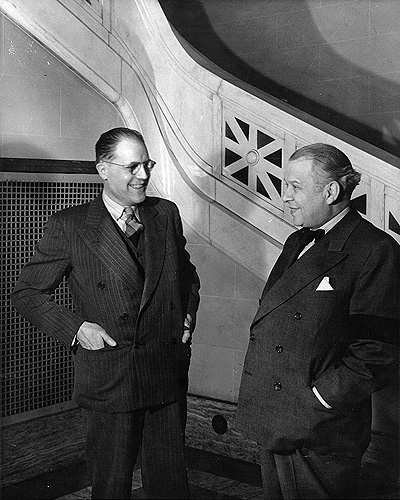
Claude Champagne (left) and Wilfrid Pelletier (right) at the opening of the Conservatoire de musique du Québec à Montréal in 1943.

Joseph Louis Wilfrid Pelletier (sometimes spelled Wilfred), CC, CMG (20 June 1896 – 9 April 1982) was a Canadian conductor, pianist, composer, and arts administrator. He was instrumental in establishing the Montreal Symphony Orchestra, serving as the orchestra's first artistic director and conductor from 1935 to 1941. He had a long and fruitful partnership with the Metropolitan Opera in New York City that began with his appointment as a rehearsal accompanist in 1917; ultimately working there as one of the company's conductors in mainly the French opera repertoire from 1929 to 1950. From 1951 to 1966, he was the principal conductor of the Orchestre Symphonique de Québec. He was also a featured conductor for a number of RCA Victor recordings, including an acclaimed reading of Gabriel Fauré's Requiem featuring baritone Mack Harrell and the Montreal Symphony Orchestra and chorus.

Pelletier was one of the most influential music educators in Canada during the 20th century. It was largely through his efforts that the Conservatoire de musique et d'art dramatique du Québec (CMADQ), an organization which has established and oversees nine different schools of higher education in music and theatre in Quebec, was established in 1942. From 1943 through 1961 he served as the director of the CMADQ and its first school the Conservatoire de musique du Québec à Montréal. He also served as the first director of the CMDAQ's second school, the Conservatoire de musique du Québec à Québec, from 1944 to 1946, and was instrumental in establishing the Conservatoire d'art dramatique du Québec à Montréal in 1954.

As a pianist, Pelletier was active during the 1920s and 1930s as one half of a piano duo with partner Arthur Loesser, the half-brother of Broadway composer Frank Loesser. The two made a number of recordings together that were made under the direction of Arthur Bodanzky. He also made a number of solo recordings and Ampico piano rolls in the early 1920s, playing mostly piano reductions from the operas of French composers like Georges Bizet, Charles Gounod, and Jules Massenet. As a composer, he produced only a small body of work, most notably In the Dark, in the Dew (published in Boston, 1923) which soprano Maria Jeritza included in a number of her recitals. He was married three times in his life, notably to opera singers Queena Mario and Rose Bampton.

== Early life and career in Canada ==
Born in Montreal, Pelletier was the son of a baker who in his spare time performed actively as an amateur musician and conducted a community concert band. At the age of 8 he began to study music with Ida Héraly, the wife of clarinetist and bandmaster François Héraly, who taught him piano, music theory, and solfège up through 1914. His older brother Albert taught him to play percussion instruments and at the age of 12 he began playing the drums with the St-Pierre-Apôtre parish temperance band in concerts at a local movie theatre.

In 1910, at the age of 14, Pelletier had his first exposure to opera, a performance of Ambroise Thomas's Mignon at His Majesty's Theatre, Montreal. The performance absolutely enthralled him and he decided that night that he wanted to pursue a career conducting operas. While attempting to find work in the field of opera he took a position as the pianist for the orchestra of the National Theatre in Montreal. In the summer of 1911 he was hired by Henri Delcellier as the rehearsal pianist with the Montreal Opera Company (MOC), remaining there until the company went bankrupt in 1913. While working for the company he married his first wife Berthe Jeannotte, the sister of tenor Albert Clerk-Jeannotte.

The experience of losing his job with the MOC made Pelletier question his potential career opportunities in Canada and he decided that he needed to find a way to go to Europe. Lack of finances prevented him from pursuing this course of action, and he continued his studies in his native city with Alexis Contant (harmony and composition), Alfred La Liberté (piano), and Rodolphe Mathieu (piano). His teachers encouraged him to enter the Prix d'Europe competition which he lost in 1914 but won in 1915. This competition win led to the Quebec government giving him a grant to pursue studies in Europe.

== Studying and working in Europe and the United States ==
In October 1916, Pelletier and his wife arrived in Paris, France in the midst of World War I and the outbreak of a major flu epidemic. Undaunted, the couple remained until circumstances related to the war forced them to leave at the end of June 1917. Although only in France for roughly nine months, Pelletier's time there was well spent under the tutelage of Isidor Philipp (piano), Marcel Samuel-Rousseau (harmony), Charles-Marie Widor (composition), and most importantly Camille Bellaigue who gave him singing lessons and worked with him in learning the French operatic repertoire on the piano.

In July 1917, the Pelletiers arrived in New York City where they were befriended by conductor Pierre Monteux who introduced them to important people in the musical social circles of the city. These connections led to his being hired at the Metropolitan Opera as a rehearsal pianist for the company's French opera productions, a position he maintained until 1922 when he was promoted to assistant conductor at the Met. Between 1917 and 1924 he also frequently played the piano for the Met's Sunday Night Concert Series, and he also portrayed the minor role of Boleslao Lazinski in Umberto Giordano's Fedora on the Met stage between 1924 and 1926. During these early years with the Met he developed a lasting friendship with Arturo Toscanini, who later hired him to conduct his NBC Symphony Orchestra on numerous occasions when he himself was unavailable. After divorcing his first wife (with whom he had two sons: Camille and François), he married Met soprano Queena Mario in 1925. That relationship also ended in divorce some years later. He later married a former voice student of Mario's, opera star Rose Bampton in 1937.

From 1919 to 1922, Pelletier was the rehearsal pianist and assistant conductor for Antonio Scotti's touring company the Scotti Opera Company where he worked under conductors Gennaro Papi and Carlo Peroni. With this company he conducted his first complete opera performance, Giuseppe Verdi's Il trovatore on 21 May 1920 in Memphis, Tennessee. In 1922, he conducted operas for the Ravinia Park Opera Company of Chicago, the San Francisco Opera, and on 19 February of that year he conducted for the first time at the Met for one of the Sunday Concerts. On 4 April 1926, he conducted his first opera at the Met, Pietro Mascagni's Cavalleria rusticana, with Carmela Ponselle as Santuzza and Armand Tokatyan as Turiddu. That same year he was appointed Artistic Director of the Sunday Night Concert series.

On 28 February 1929, Pelletier was promoted by Giulio Gatti-Casazza from assistant to regular conductor at the Met, a position he maintained through 1950. His first performance in this title was conducting Deems Taylor's The King's Henchman on the following 29 March with Edward Johnson, Florence Easton, and Lawrence Tibbett starring. He went on to conduct the house premieres of Benjamin Godard's ballet Reminiscence, Johann Strauss II's Die Fledermaus, Domenico Cimarosa's Il matrimonio segreto, and Igor Stravinsky's Apollo. He was also the driving force behind establishing the 'Metropolitan Opera Auditions of the Air' competition (precursor to the Metropolitan National Council Auditions) in 1936. His final and 462nd performance at the Met was on 15 May 1950 conducting Charles Gounod's Faust with Giuseppe Di Stefano in the title role, Nadine Conner as Marguerite, Luben Vichey as Méphistophélès, and Robert Merrill as Valentin.

During the 1940s, Pelletier made several opera recordings at the request of the National Committee for Music Appreciation in New York with artists from the Metropolitan Opera. These gramophone records (78-rpm albums) were abridged versions of popular operas like Aida, La Bohème, Carmen, Faust, I Pagliacci, Madama Butterfly, Rigoletto, and La traviata among others. The recordings were originally released by the World's Greatest Operas label, and many of them were later reissued by RCA Camden and Parade Records on LP. In 1938 he appeared on camera in Paramount's feature film The Big Broadcast of 1938 as he conducted Norwegian soprano Kirsten Flagstad in Brunhilde's Battle Cry from Richard Wagner's Die Walküre.

== The Montreal Symphony Orchestra ==
While working at the Met in the early 1930s, Pelletier was approached by Canadian industrialist and philanthropist Jean Lallemand to collaborate with him and the Béique and David families of Montreal in establishing a new orchestra in his native city. He initially rejected the offer, still having a somewhat critical attitude towards the state of the arts in Canada. However, he was later persuaded by his father, who reminded him of the support of the Quebec government earlier in his life, to have pride in his country and do what he could in service to it. He accordingly returned to Montreal and began putting together what would eventually become the Montreal Symphony Orchestra (MSO).

The MSO gave its first concert under the name Les Concerts Symphoniques in January 1935 at Plateau Hall. On 16 November 1935, the orchestra performed the first of many Matinées symphoniques pour la jeunesse (The Young People's concert) which had been Pelletier's brainchild. In 1936 he established the Montreal Festivals, which included a summer concert series by the MSO in addition to featuring other Canadian ensembles and musicians. The festival continued annually long after Pelletier's departure from the MSO in 1941. He notably returned to conduct the festival's last performance before it was disestablished at the Place des Arts in August 1965.

== The Conservatoire de musique et d'art dramatique du Québec ==
Pelletier was appointed the first director of the Conservatoire de musique et d'art dramatique du Québec and its first school, the Conservatoire de musique de Montréal (CMQM), in 1943. During the late 1930s and early 1940s, Canadian composer Claude Champagne had put together a large report on music education that was sponsored by the Quebec government. The report closely examined music education in Europe as well as in Canada and plans were soon formed to establish a network of state-subsidized school which would be modeled after European conservatories, particularly the Conservatoire de Paris. On 29 May 1942 The Conservatory Act ('Loi du conservatoire') was passed by the Legislative Assembly of Quebec which allocated a $30,000 budget to form the conservatoire.

Pelletier and Champagne, who was appointed the conservatoire's assistant director, were largely responsible for recruiting a highly impressive international staff of teachers. The CMQM opened its doors in January 1943 with its first round of courses which were held at the Saint-Sulpice Library. Under their leadership, the school gained a high reputation for the quality of its education. In 1956 the two men oversaw the moving of the school to better facilities on Saint Catherine Street. Pelletier was succeeded in the role of director by Roland Leduc in 1961 after 18 years on the job. He also served as the first director of the CMDAQ's second school, the Conservatoire de musique du Québec à Québec, from 1944 until 1946 when Henri Gagnon succeeded him.

== The Orchestre Symphonique de Québec and later life and career ==
Pelletier and his wife both decided to leave the Metropolitan Opera when Rudolf Bing was appointed the company's new general manager in 1950. Bampton stated in a 1989 interview that, "Both of us got the feeling that we wouldn't be happy with the new regime." This change considerably freed up Pelletier's schedule and enabled him to accept at offer to become artistic director of the Orchestre Symphonique de Québec. He assumed the post in June 1951, remaining there for the next 15 years. During that time he also conducted the Children's Concerts of the New York Philharmonic from 1952 to 1957 and the tours of the National Youth Orchestra of Canada in 1960–1961.

Pelletier retired from performance in the early 1970s and thereafter lived with his wife in New York City. He died in Wayne, Pennsylvania in 1982 and was interred in the cemetery at St. David's Episcopal Church. His memoirs, Une symphonie inachevée, were published ten years prior to his death.

== Honours ==
- In 1936, he was awarded an Honorary Doctor of Music degree from the Université de Montréal.
- In 1946, he was appointed a Companion of the Order of St Michael and St George.
- In 1952, he was awarded an Honorary Doctor of Music degree from the Université Laval.
- In 1953, he was awarded an Honorary Doctor of Music degree from the University of Alberta.
- In 1958, a boulevard in Ville d'Anjou, Montreal was named after him. Along the road is also a primary school which bears his name.
- In 1959, he was awarded an Honorary Doctor of Music degree from the New York College of Music.
- In 1960, he was awarded an Honorary Doctor of Music degree from Hobart College.
- In 1965, the music school of the Sisters of Ste-Anne in Montreal was named after him.
- In 1966, he was awarded an Honorary Doctor of Music degree from Ottawa University.
- In 1966, the Place des Arts' Salle Wilfrid-Pelletier, the largest multi-purpose concert hall in Canada, was named in his honour.
- In 1967, he was appointed a Companion of the Order of Canada.
- In 1968, he was awarded an Honorary Doctor of Music degree from McGill University.
- In 1978, he was awarded an Honorary Doctor of Music degree from the Université du Québec.
- In 1983, the Wilfrid Pelletier Foundation was established, an organization which annually awards grants to holders of the premier prix of the Conservatoire de musique du Québec.
- In 1984, sculptor Arto Tchakmaktchian made a bronze bust of Pelletier which is on display at the Place des Arts.
- In 2002, he became a MasterWorks honouree for the Audio-Visual Preservation Trust of Canada.
