= Guerdy J. Préval =

Haitian-Canadian painter (born 1950)

Guerdy Jacques Préval
- Born: 3 March 1950 (age 76); Port-au-Prince, Haïti
- Education: Université du Québec à Montréal
- Known for: Painter, essayist
- Website: www.guerdypreval.com

Guerdy Jacques Préval (born March 1950 in Port-au-Prince, Haiti) is a Haitian-Canadian painter. He now lives and works in Montreal, Quebec, Canada.

== Life ==
Guerdy Jacques Preval was born in Port-au-Prince, Haiti, in 1950. At a young age, he began taking summer classes in ceramics and, then in painting at the workshop Poto-Mitan led by painters Tiga and Dorcély. Later, at the Athenaeum Studio Art, he continued his apprenticeship under the supervision of Emmanuel Pierre-Charles and Valentin Iviquel who quickly became his friends.

In 1972, Préval emigrated to Montreal. In conjunction with his activities as an artist, he obtained a Bachelor of Arts and a Master of Art Studies at the Université du Québec à Montréal (UQAM). In 2001, he exhibited his work at the 49th edition of the Venice Biennale Contemporary Arts.

== Works ==
The painting of Préval, according to the art historian Carlo A. Célius, "manifests […] a passion for beautiful shapes, bright colors, a drawing virtuosity and skill in a spatial environment, which, however, never form a pure formalism."

Indeed, there is in the painting of Préval a permanent tension between the figurative and the abstract, which aims only toward one objective: to break with a certain classicism. There are so many moments that troubled areas are deaf or silent. Sometimes, they try to identify the principles of strength and fragility of humans. Sometimes, they evoke historical event of the home country, in particular. These echoes of a scarred land, Haiti, are major contributors to the aesthetics of Preval.

However, Préval remains "a painter of the body". "It's on the body, according to Carlo A. Célius that prove two other main characteristics of his work: eroticism and dreamlike, the first as format and the second as layout. The body, mostly female, erotic in its posture, its forms, symbols and situations associated suggested rises, acts, moves into a dreamy space…"

Préval had the privilege of exhibiting, in solo and group exhibitions, his work around the world, especially in Hong Kong, Paris, Venice, Rome, Montreal, Toronto, New York City, Miami, Boston, Santo Domingo, Port-au-Prince and Lagos. His works are included in several publications, including the Canadian guide to visual arts, Le Guide Vallée.

In addition, Préval is pursuing research on the popular Haitian cultural expressions that he regularly publishes in the form of books and articles.

The artist, who still lives in Montreal after several attempts to return home, has won several awards and grants to support his creativity from both federal and provincial levels of the Canadian government.

== Prizes, awards and recognnition ==
- 1976: Second Winner at "Gouverneurs de la Rosée" Concours, Port-au-Prince, Haïti
- 1980: Only contemporary artist to have exhibited his works at Place Royale, Quebec, Canada
- 2001: Exhibition at the 49th edition of the Venice Biennale of Contemporary Arts

== Exhibitions ==
=== Personal exhibitions ===
- 1969: Académie des Beaux-Arts (Port-au-Prince, Haiti)
- 1972: Athénée Studio Art (Port-au-Prince, Haiti)
- 1974: Mont-Tremblant (Quebec, Canada)
- 1979: Complexe Desjardins (Montreal, Canada)
- 1980: Haiti-Diaspora, Quebec University in Montreal (Montreal, Canada)
- 1980: Place Royale, Quebec, Canada
- 1985: La Ataranza (Santo Domingo, Dominican Republic)
- 1990: Nuances, French Institute (Port-au-Prince, Haiti)
- 1994: Souvenirs ankylosés, Gallery Entre-Cadre (Montreal, Canada)
- 1995: Peinture en extase, Gallery Entre-Cadre (Montreal, Canada)
- 2003: Entretien, Gallery Entre-Cadre (Montreal, Canada)

=== Collective exhibitions ===
- 1969: Académie des Beaux-Arts (Port-au-Prince, Haiti)
- 1975: Columbia University’s "New York World Fair" (New York, USA)
- 1976: Gouverneurs de la Rosée Concours, Galerie Nader (Port-au-Prince, Haiti)
- 1976: United Nations (New York, USA)
- 1977: Lee Garden (Hong Kong, China)
- 1983: International Festival of Arts (Montreal, Canada)
- 1986: UNESCO (New York, USA)
- 1987: Contemporary Art at Grand Palais (Paris, France)
- 1989: Festival Gallery (Haiti)
- 1999: Gallerie Carmel (Ottawa, Canada)
- 2000: Bergeron Gallery (Ottawa, Canada)
- 2001: 49th edition of the Venice Biennale Contemporary Arts (Venice, Italy)
- 2001: Voodoo's Painters, Istituto Italo-Latino-Americano (Rome, Italy)
- 2004: Art Off the Main, Puck Building (New York, USA)
- 2004: Bank Street College of Education (New York, USA)
- 2005: Art Off the Main, Puck Building (New York, USA)

== Publications ==
- Proverbes haïtiens illustrés, National Museums of Canada, Ottawa, 1985.
- Gérard Dupervil ou La Voix d'une génération, Ilan-Ilan éditeur, Sherbrooke, 1995.
- La Musique populaire haïtienne de l'ère coloniale à nos jours, éditions Histoires Nouvelles, Montréal, 2003.
- Histoire d'Haïti : la nôtre, éditions Histoires Nouvelles, Montréal, 2008.
- Histoire de la culture haïtienne, éditions Histoires Nouvelles, Montréal, 2012.
- Dialogue avec l'Histoire. Tome I. Pour mieux connaître le vrai visage de l'occupation américaine, de 1915 à nos jours, éditions Histoires Nouvelles, Montréal, 2017.
- Dialogue avec l'Histoire. Tome II. De la Croix du débarquement de Christophe Colomb et le pourquoi du débarquement des Marines américains, éditions Histoires Nouvelles, Montréal, 2017.
- D'un royaume à l'autre : le roi Coupé Cloué et ses héroïnes, éditions Histoires Nouvelles, Montréal, 2018.
