= Catherine Souffront =

Canadian actress and singer

Catherine Souffront, also sometimes credited as Catherine Souffront Darbouze, is a Canadian actress and singer from Quebec, best known for her regular roles as Mylène Rancourt in L'Œil du cyclone and Myrlande Prospère in Lakay Nou.

Born and raised in Quebec to immigrant parents from Haiti, She began her acting career in the late 2010s with small supporting roles in film and television, including appearances in Reasonable Doubt (Doute raisonnable), Entre deux draps, L'Effet secondaire and Sans rendez-vous, before having her first prominent film role as Jessica in the 2022 film Two Days Before Christmas (23 décembre). In the same year, she also had a leading role as Coralie in the children's comedy series L'Île Kilucru, and a regular supporting role as Jocelyne, a nurse, in Les Bracelets rouges, the Quebec adaptation of Red Band Society.

In late 2025 she released "Wish You Well", her debut rhythm and blues single, under the stage name Cath Darbouze. In an interview with the magazine 7 Jours, she clarified that Darbouze is her mother's maiden surname, and stated that she wished to become known as Catherine Souffront Darbouze.
