= Nadine Magloire =

Haitian-Canadian writer (born 1932)

Nadine Magloire (February 10, 1932 - December 25, 2021) was a Haitian-Canadian writer.

== Biography ==
The daughter of journalist Jean Magloire and composer Carmen Brouard, she was born in Port-au-Prince and was educated at the Institution Sainte Rose de Lima there. Magloire continued her education at the Collège International Marie de France in Montreal. Magloire also took correspondence courses in journalism. In 1955, she moved to Paris to pursue studies at the Centre d'Etudes de Radiodiffusion et Télévision. On her return to Port-au-Prince, she studied at the École normale supérieure there.

In 1968, she published the novel Le mal de vivre, considered to be the first feminist book published in Haiti. Looking at sexuality from a feminist perspective, it was controversial for its time. An exchange of letters between Magloire and Simone de Beauvoir followed the publication of this book. In 1975, she organized an exhibition of women artists at the Institut Français in Port-au-Prince. From March 1978 to March 1979, she published a cultural journal Le fil d'Ariane. In 1979, after spending time in Haiti and abroad, often in Canada, she settled in Montreal.

== Selected works ==
Sources:

- Autopsie in vivo: le sexe mythique, novel (1975)
- Autopsie in vivo, novel (2009)
- Autopsie in vivo (la suite), novel (2010)
