= Alexis Contant =

Canadian composer and musician

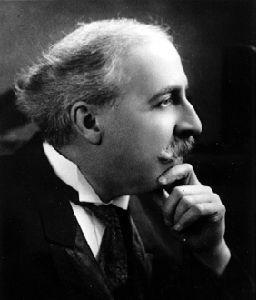
- Born: 12 November 1858; Montreal, Canada East
- Died: 28 November 1918 (aged 60); Montreal, Quebec, Canada
- Resting place: Notre Dame des Neiges Cemetery
- Occupations: composer; musician; educator

Joseph Pierre Alexis Contant (12 November 1858 – 28 November 1918) was a Canadian composer, organist, pianist, and music educator. Trained as a pianist, he became one of the first Canadians to compose large-scale choral and orchestral works, in spite of the difficulty of finding suitable teachers of musical composition. His younger years were spent mostly in teaching, family, and work as a church organist, and many of his compositions were written later in life.

== Early life ==
Contant was born in Montreal, the son of two amateur musicians. His father was a violinist who was involved in a number of community ensembles and his mother was a piano and voice student of Emma Albani. His younger siblings, Marie and Joseph-Albert, also became musicians. All three children had their initial musical lessons from their mother. At the age of 11, Contant became a pupil of organist and pianist Joseph-A. Fowler and two years later gave his first public recital. At the age of 17 he became a student of Calixa Lavallée, who had just returned from Paris. Contant himself wanted to pursue studies in Europe, but his father forbade him to go in fear that European society might be detrimental to Alexis's religious faith.

== Career ==
Contant spent his late teenage years and early twenties working as an accompanist for a variety of artists, including violinist Frantz Jehin-Prume. He took a post teaching at the Collège de L'Assomption in 1880–1881. In 1883 he traveled with Lavallée to Boston where he was able to pursue intense studies with his teacher in music composition, harmony, and counterpoint. While there he also had the opportunity to attend operas for the first time and went to many orchestral concerts and recitals. He was particularly moved by a concert of Charles Gounod's La Rédemption. During the trip, Lavallée became ill and Contant was asked to substitute for his teacher in several concerts, which gave him attacks of severe stage fright. These attacks led him to decide to abandon a performance career in favor of composition, teaching, and the organ for church work.

Upon returning to Montreal in June 1883, Contant became a pupil of organist and composer Guillaume Couture, but the two did not get along well and he soon left. He pursued studies in composition on his own by analyzing the scores of the works by composers Bach, Mozart, Wagner, Massenet, and Franck among others. He joined the faculty at the Collège de Montréal, teaching there until 1890.

In 1885 Contant took a post as organist at St-Jean-Baptiste Church in Montreal, a position he held until his death more than thirty years later. From 1900 to 1918 he taught at Mont-St-Louis College and from 1905 to 1917 he taught at the Conservatoire national de musique. He also ran a private studio in his home. Among his notable pupils were Victor Brault, Claude Champagne, Orpha-F. Deveaux, J.-J. Gagnier, Rodolphe Mathieu and Wilfrid Pelletier. See: List of music students by teacher: C to F#Alexis Contant. His daughter Fleurette was a concert singer and music teacher and his grandson Jean-Yves Contant worked as a producer for CBC Radio from 1938 to 1979. His other daughter, Aline, was married to the painter Georges Delfosse.

In 1914 he suffered a paralytic stroke which severely limited his mobility. This virtually ended his activity as a composer. After his death in 1918, he was entombed at the Notre Dame des Neiges Cemetery in Montreal.

== Compositions ==
Contant's compositional output was minimal before 1900. As his children grew older, he was able to devote more time to composition and therefore his later life was his most productive.

Contant's compositional output includes several symphonic works and works for chorus and orchestra, works for chorus with organ accompaniment, a small body of chamber music, and several pieces for solo piano and solo organ. His works were published in Paris by Hamelle, Haussman, and L. Grus and in Montreal by Archambault, Beauchemin, Joseph-Émile Bélair, A.J. Boucher, L. Cardinal, Édition Belgo-Canadienne, and J.-G. Yon and in Le Passe-Temps. The Canadian Encyclopedia states that, "Contant was a pioneer whose vision was on a large scale, and although the results of his efforts do not equal his ambitions, he displays a sincerity and honesty worthy of admiration."

One of Contant's first pieces to be widely played in both Canada and Europe was La Lyre enchantée (1875), a 'fantaisie-nocturne' for piano. His third mass was premiered in February 1903 at the Monument national in a performance conducted by Edmond Hardy. Also premiered at the Monument-National was his Caïn in November 1905; it was one of the first oratorios written by a Canadian composer. He wrote a second oratorio, Les Deux Âmes, which was composed between 1905 and 1909 but did not premiere until 1913. His Trio for violin, cello and piano is the most often performed of his major works. After a stroke in 1914 he composed only one more song, Sur Un Crucifix to a poem by Albert Lozeau.
