= Fayolle Jean =

Canadian film and television actor

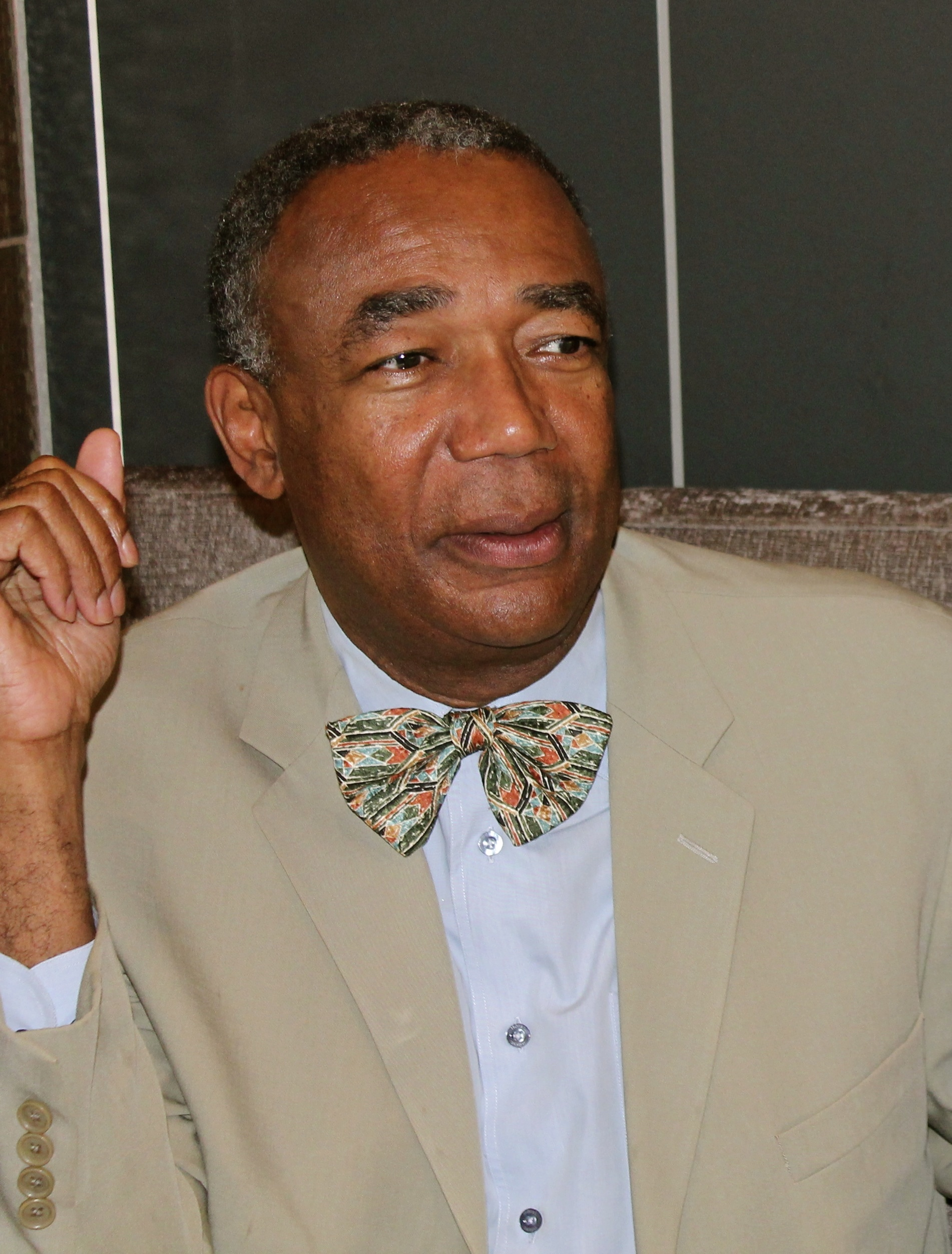
- Born: July 17, 1956 (age 68); Les Cayes, Haiti
- Occupation: Actor
- Years active: 1970s–present
- Children: Fayolle Jean Jr.

Fayolle Jean (born July 17, 1953) is a Haitian Canadian actor from Montreal, Quebec, best known for his starring role as Frank Honoré in the television series Lakay Nou.

Originally from Les Cayes, Haiti, he had a career as an actor and radio broadcaster in Haiti before emigrating to Canada in 1979, where he was a founder of the Théâtre Libre d'Haïti au Québec theatre company.

He has been most prominently a stage actor, although he has also had film and television roles beginning with a small bit part in How to Make Love to a Negro Without Getting Tired (Comment faire l'amour avec un nègre sans se fatiguer) in 1989. His most noted roles have included Victor in A Sunday in Kigali (Un dimanche à Kigali), Joseph Louboutin in the third season of Durham County, writer Joseph in Of Ink and Blood (D'encre et de sang), and an alternate reality version of Denzel Washington in There Are No False Undertakings (Il n'y a pas de faux métier).

His son, Fayolle Jean Jr., is also an actor. The two have acted together in the films Scratch and Première vague.
