= André Turp =

Canadian opera singer

André Turp (December 21, 1925, Montreal – February 25, 1991, Montreal) was a Canadian tenor, particularly associated with the French and Italian repertories.

== Life and career ==
André Turp took private voice lessons with Édouard Woolley and Frank H. Rowe, before entering the Montreal Music Conservatory, where he was a pupil of Ruzena Herlinger. He was then awarded a grant and went to Italy to study with Hélène Vita. He made his stage debut in 1950 in operettas with the "Variétés Lyriques", in Montreal. He also took part in several programs with the Canadian Broadcasting Corporation. A biographical note from Covent Garden·on his first appearance there revealed that he had appeared in twenty-one Offenbach operettas.

His true operatic debut took place in 1956, at New Orleans, where he sang Roméo in Roméo et Juliette, Rodolfo in La Bohème, and Cavaradossi in Tosca. He then appeared with the Opera Guild of Montreal, in the late 1950s, as Macduff in Macbeth, and Fenton in Falstaff.

His major breakthrough came in London, at the Royal Opera House, where he made his debut on February 5, 1960, as Edgardo in Lucia di Lammermoor, opposite Joan Sutherland. He was to appear with that company for several seasons in numerous roles including the Duke of Mantua, Alfredo, Turiddu, Rodolfo, Cavaradossi, etc. He sang the tenor role of the High Priest in the premiere of Frederick Ashton's ballet Persephone for the Royal Ballet in December 1961. He was invited to the Glyndebourne Festival in 1961, where he sang in the British premiere of Hans Werner Henze's Elegy for Young Lovers.

At about the same time, he began a long association with the Opéra-Comique and the Palais Garnier (Edgard in Lucie de Lammermoor), adding to his repertoire roles such as Werther (a role he sang with great success an estimated 500 times in Europe), Faust, Don José in Carmen, Hoffmann in Les contes d'Hoffmann, etc. He also appeared in Switzerland, Spain and Portugal.

In the 1970s, for the BBC he participated in performances of the original versions of Verdi's Simon Boccanegra and Don Carlos, which have been reissued by Opera Rara. He also sang the role of Giasone in the 1958 recording of excerpts from Luigi Cherubini's Médée (Cherubini) with Eileen Farrell and Ezio Flagello under Arnold Gamson, and took the title role in the 1962 recording of La Damnation de Faust by Berlioz with the London Symphony Orchestra and Chorus conducted by Pierre Monteux.

Turp retired from the stage in 1983. He taught at the Montreal Music Conservatory from 1979 until 1989, and served on juries for international competitions in Toulouse and Verviers.

== Sources ==
- The Encyclopedia of Music in Canada, Gilles Potvin.
