= Claude Champagne =

French Canadian composer, teacher, pianist and violinist (1891–1965)

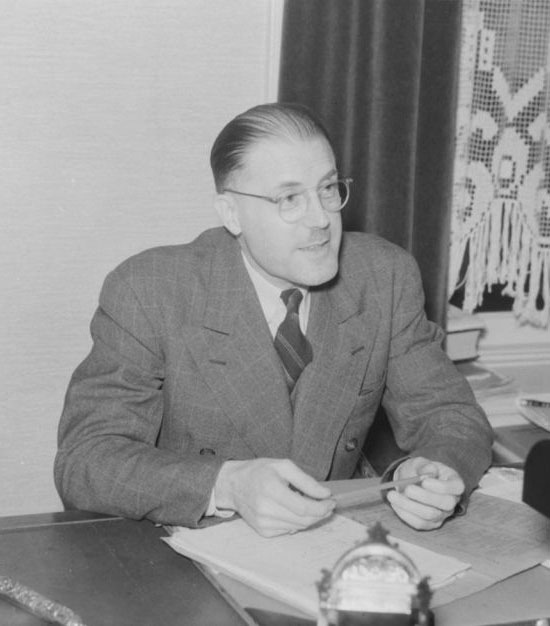
- Claude Champagne sitting at his desk, 1941
- Born: 27 May 1891; Montreal, Quebec, Canada
- Died: 21 December 1965 (aged 74); Montreal, Quebec, Canada
- Occupation: composer violinist pianist

Claude Champagne (27 May 1891 – 21 December 1965) was a French Canadian composer, teacher, pianist, and violinist.

== Early life and education ==
Born as Joseph-Arthur-Adonaï Claude Champagne in Montreal, Quebec, Champagne began piano and theory at 10 with Orpha-F. Deveaux, and continued with Romain-Octave Pelletier I and Alexis Contant at the Conservatoire national de musique. At 14, he studied violin with Albert Chamberland. He earned diplomas from private institutions: the Dominion College of Music (theory and piano, 1908) and the Conservatoire national of Montreal.

== Career ==
=== Early career ===
Between 1910 and 1921 Champagne taught piano, violin, and other instruments at the Varennes and Longueuil colleges. He performed on viola and saxophone with the Canadian Grenadier Guards Band directed by J.-J. Gagnier and gave private lessons in theory and harmony. He accompanied choirs, including that of the Maisonneuve district, and played violin during intermissions at the National, a variety theatre.

In 1921 Champagne went to Paris to study music. By then he had developed an interest in modality, which stayed with him the rest of his life. His symphonic poem Hercule et Omphale, composed in 1918, was first performed in Paris on 31 March 1926 at the Salle de l'Ancien Conservatoire under the direction of violinist, composer and conductor Juan Mendés. Even if the work's performance did not make its mark on the Parisian musical scene, the mere fact that it was programmed was a token of recognition of the composer's talent. Indeed, the Quebec papers were full of praise for Champagne's success in the French capital.

=== Later career ===
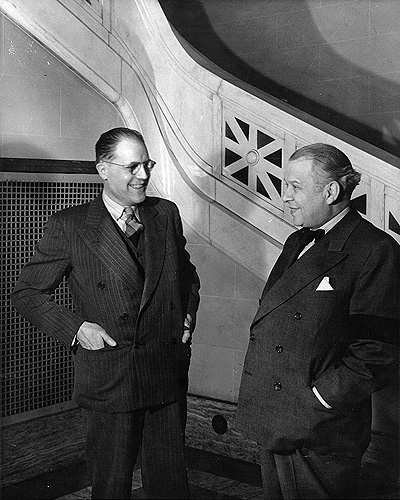
Claude Champagne (left) and Wilfrid Pelletier, 1943

At his return to Canada, Champagne became heavily involved in teaching. In 1932 he joined the Faculty of Music at McGill University, where he taught until 1941.

He played an instrumental role in establishing the Conservatoire de musique et d'art dramatique du Québec in 1942. In 1943 he was appointed the first assistant director of the Montreal Conservatoire. In the 1950s, with Boris Berlin, he published a series of sight reading exercise books for students. In 1950 his post-romantic work Concerto was recorded by BMI Canada, and in about 1955 his First String Quartet was performed by the Montreal String Quartet, and recorded by the CBC Transcription Service.

He was attached to the Montreal Catholic School Commission as co-ordinator of solfége in elementary schools, and he was at the same time professor at the McGill Conservatory. After that, he taught many Canadian composers including Jean Vallerand and François Morel.

== Death ==
He died in Montreal on 21 December 1965. A concert hall at the Université de Montréal was later named for him.

== Works ==
- Symphonie Gaspésienne
- Fantaisie "J'ai du bon tabac" – for orchestra
- Hercule et Omphale – for orchestra
- La Laurentienne – for orchestra
- Danse Villageoise
- Piano Concerto (Fiesta)
- Suite Canadienne – for choir and orchestra
- Berceuse – for small orchestra
- Prière – for organ
- Quadrilha Brasileira for Piano (1942)
- Many choral pieces

== Awards and honours ==
In 1963, Champagne was presented with an award by the Canada Council.

== See also ==
See: List of music students by teacher: C to F#Claude Champagne.
