= Ève Gagnier =

Canadian actress and singer (1930–1984)

Ève Gagnier (November 12, 1930 – September 19, 1984) was an actress and singer in Quebec, Canada.

The daughter of René Gagnier, a musician, conductor and composer, she was born in Montreal and was educated at the Conservatoire de musique du Québec à Montréal, studying voice with Martial Singher, piano with Auguste Descarries and harp with Marcel Grandjany.

In 1957, Gagnier took on the role of Tite-Ange in the film Le Survenant, followed by the same role in the television series Au chenal du moine; this first brought her to the attention of the Quebec public. From 1954 to 1966, she performed as a singer on the program L'Heure du concert. She went on to perform in various operettas and musical comedies on stage and on CBC radio and television. She also provided voices for various children's programs such as Passe-Partout (as Cannelle).

Her sister Claire was also a well-known singer.

She died in Montreal at the age of 53 at the Hôtel-Dieu de Montréal after suffering from kidney problems.

Rue Ève-Gagnier in Montreal was named in her honour.
