= Claire Gagnier =

Canadian singer (1924–2022)

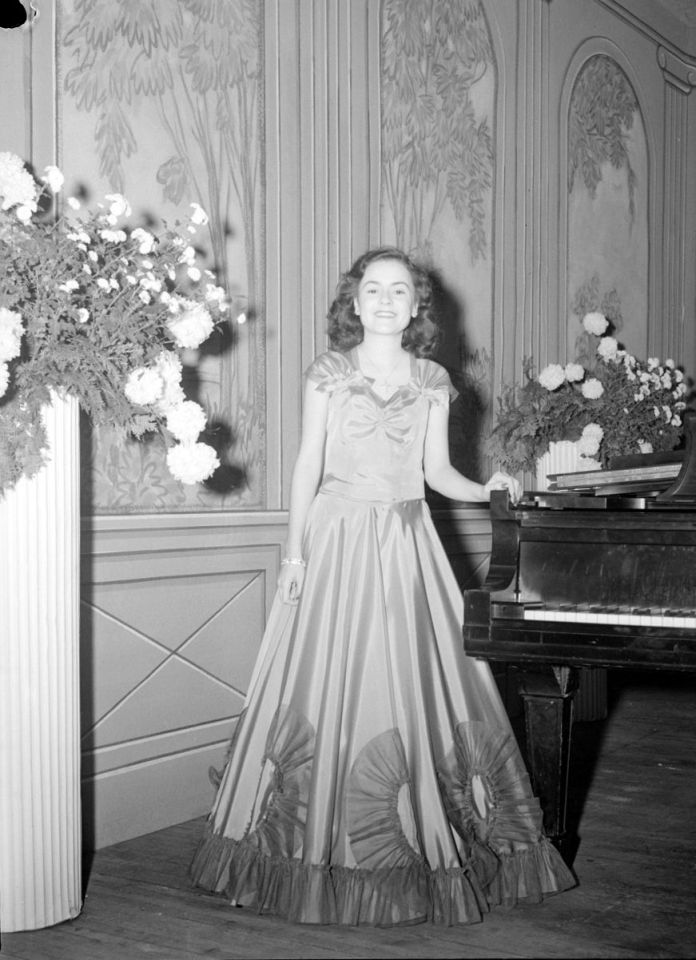

Background information
- Born: March 28, 1924; Montreal, Quebec, Canada
- Died: December 25, 2022 (aged 98)
- Genres: Opera
- Instrument: Vocals

Claire Gagnier (March 28, 1924 – December 25, 2022) was a Canadian soprano singer from Quebec.

== Life and career ==
Gagnier was born in Montreal on March 28, 1924, and took voice lessons from Roger Filiatrault. In 1944, she won first prize on the Canadian Broadcasting Corporation (CBC) program Singing Stars of Tomorrow. Assisted by a grant from the provincial government, she attended the Juilliard School in New York City. In May 1945, she appeared in The Marriage of Figaro with members of the Metropolitan Opera. Gagnier appeared in many concerts in Canada and the United States. She performed in CBC radio and television opera broadcasts, including La bohème, Così fan tutte and Madama Butterfly. She appeared regularly on the CBC radio program "Serenade For Strings" and the CBC television shows "À la claire fontaine" and "The Jackie Rae Show".

In 1972, she received the Calixa-Lavallée Award from the Montreal Saint-Jean-Baptiste Society. Gagnier was named to the Order of Canada in 1990. In 1996, she was inducted into the Canadian Opera Hall of Fame.

Her sister Ève was a well-known Quebec actress. Claire Gagnier died on December 25, 2022, at the age of 98.
