= Graton =

Graton may refer to:

- Graton, California, an unincorporated town in Sonoma County
- Graton Rancheria, a former federal land holding
- Graton Resort & Casino, Sonoma County
- Françoise Graton (1930–2014), Québécoise actress
- Jean Graton (1923–2021), French comics author
  - Studio Graton, his drawing studio
  - Graton éditeur, his publishing house
- Louis Caryl Graton (1880–1970), American geologist

== See also ==
- Gratton (disambiguation)
