= Graton éditeur =

The logo of the publishing house is made after the Vaillante logo from the series Michel Vaillant.

Graton Editeur is a French publishing house created by comics drawer and writer Jean Graton in 1982. It is owned by Jean Graton and his son Philippe. Graton Editeur have published the works of Jean Graton, among them the famous comics series Michel Vaillant.

== History ==
On February 7, 1957, Jean Graton created the character Michel Vaillant. Five short stories were published in Tintin. In the face of their huge popularity, a full album was drawn and written by Jean Graton, published in Tintin in 1959. In 1966, the adventures of Michel Vaillant were adapted for TV. In 1981, in order to be able to fully control the production of his albums, he created his own publishing house – Graton éditor – with his son Philippe, who became managing director. From 1982 on, new albums are published by Graton editeur, owned by Philippe and Jean Graton. In 1986, the album "Irish coffee" was awarded the Morzine Avoriaz Festival's Grand Prix. In 1990, the adventures were adapted for animation series on TV. In 1995, a new series was launched, the Dossiers Michel Vaillant series, with comics and information on important figures in the automobile industry. In 2000, the Palmarès Inedit series was created. In recent years, Jean Graton has left the scenario writing to his son Philippe and the drawing was done by the Studio Graton. In 2010, after several years without an album by Michel Vaillant, Graton publisher signed a partnership contract with Dupuis editions with the aim of revitalizing its flagship series. In 2020, this partnership did not meet the expectations of the Graton clan and in order to permanently perpetuate the series thanks to a major player in French-speaking publishing, the latter ended up selling his company to Dupuis and giving him all the rights to the series, with the exception of moral rights.

== Publications ==
- Michel Vaillant
- Les dossiers Michel vaillant
- Palmares inédit
- Les Labourdets
- Julie Wood
