= Gratton (surname) =

Gratton is an English locational surname, a variant of Gradon.

== Notable people with this surname ==
Hockey players

- Chris Gratton (born 1975), Canadian professional ice hockey player
- Benoît Gratton (born 1976), Canadian ice hockey forward
- Gilles Gratton (born 1952), Canadian ice hockey goaltender
- Josh Gratton (born 1982), Canadian professional ice hockey left wing
- Norm Gratton (1950–2010), Canadian professional right wing

Others

- Frank Lymer Gratton (1871–1946), Australian choral conductor and educator
- Hector Gratton (1900–1970), Canadian composer
- Lynda Gratton (born 1953), British psychologist and management academic
- Sarah Gratton (born 1966), British film producer, author and former actress

== Fiction ==
- Bob 'Elvis' Gratton, the subject of multiple films and a 1980s television series of the same name by Quebec director Pierre Falardeau
- Bob Gratton: Ma Vie My life, Québécois sitcom television series in 2007
