= Ziloti =

Ziloti may refer to

- Alexander Siloti, Russian pianist, conductor and composer
- Ziloti, Xanthi, a settlement in the Xanthi regional unit, Greece
