= Gratton =

Gratton may refer to:

- Gratton (surname)
- Gratton, Derbyshire, England
- Gratton, former settlement in Devon, England

== See also ==
- Graton (disambiguation)
