= Greydon =

Greydon may refer to:

- Greydon Square
- Greydon (surname)
