= Albert Viau =

Canadian opera singer

Albert Viau (6 November 1910 – 27 June 2001) was a Canadian baritone, folksinger, composer, and music educator. After beginning his career as a musician in the classical repertoire, he specialized in folk music and traditional songs. He released about 50 78 rpm records during his career, mostly for La Bonne Chanson. He also recorded a few songs under the pseudonym Jacques Dupont, including Partons, la mer est belle, Le Soir sur l'eau, and Le Lac des amours, and recorded the song Le Rêve passe with the Canadian Grenadier Guards Band for RCA. Many of his recordings include his own compositions. During his lifetime he wrote more than 200 songs, many of them comic patter songs, as well as hymns and two requiem masses.

== Early life and education ==
Born in Montreal, Viau studied the piano in his youth with Arthur Caron. At the age of 17 he began studying singing seriously. He received his early training privately and only later in life pursued university studies. In 1966 he earned a Bachelor of Music from the Université de Montréal and that same year was awarded a teaching certificate from the Quebec Ministry of Education. His teachers included Victor Brault, Arthur Laurendeau (voice), Conrad Letendre (diction), Georges Mercure (Gregorian chant), Oscar O'Brien, Michel Perrault, and Roland Van de Goor (harmony).

== Career ==
Viau made his professional opera debut as Mercutio in Charles Gounod's Roméo et Juliette at Loew's Theatre in Montreal in 1931. From 1932 to 1934 he sang in Paul-Émile Corbeil's Imperial Grenadiers. For the Canadian Radio Broadcasting Commission he performed in two series in 1934: La Petite Histoire and Le Chanteur de lied. For the latter series he collaborated with pianists Léo-Pol Morin and Jean-Marie Beaudet. He soon after began singing on CBC Radio programs. He notably performed for 21 years on Le Réveil rural and 15 years on Le Quart d'heure de La Bonne Chanson. The majority of his recordings were made from the late 1930s through the 1950s.

Viau began composing his own works in the late 1930s. In 1954 he published Six Chansonnettes pour bambins et bambines and in 1958 Six Chansons enfantines with Éditions Albert Viau. From 1953 to 1954 he worked for CJMS as a radio producer. He served as the choirmaster at St-Sixte Church in Ville St-Laurent, Montreal from 1950 to 1983; also operating a private studio during those years where he taught voice, piano, guitar, and recorder lessons. From 1965 to 1985 he taught music for the Catholic School Commission of Montreal. He continued to give recitals in Canada and the United States and work with vocal groups as a director and arranger until his retirement in 1986.

In 2001 Viau died in Montreal at the age of 90. His archives are currently held by the Société d'histoire de la Haute-Yamaska.
