= Puddicombe =

Puddicombe is a surname. Notable people with the surname include:

- Andy Puddicombe (born 1972), British author, public speaker and teacher of meditation and mindfulness
- Harry Puddicombe (1870–1953}, Canadian composer, pianist and music educator
- Allen Raine, pseudonym of Anne Adalisa Puddicombe (1836–1908; her married name), a Welsh novelist
