= Amédée Tremblay =

Canadian organist, composer, and music educator

Pierre-Joseph Amédée Tremblay (14 April 1876 – 14 July 1949) was a Canadian organist, composer, and music educator. A largely self-taught composer, his output includes several motets, two masses, a few patriotic songs, works for solo organ, and the operetta L'Intransigeant (produced in Ottawa in 1906). His organ piece Suite de quatre pièces pour grand orgue is his most well known composition. Dedicated to Joseph Bonnet, it is noted for its "brilliant toccata" at the finale. His works have been published by Orme, Le Passe-Temps, and Ed. Archambault. Composers Guillaume Couture and Vincent d'Indy were admirers of Tremblay's music.

== Life and career ==
Born in Montreal, Tremblay, along with Alexis Contant, was one of the first major Canadian composers to be trained exclusively in his native country. At the age of 12 he began studying music with Father Sauvé, the organist at Saint Joseph's Church in Montreal. He later studied with Alcibiade Béique (piano and organ), Father Cléophas Borduas (Gregorian chant), and Romain-Octave Pelletier I (organ and fugue).

Tremblay became the organist at Saint Joseph's Church in 1892 after having turned down a similar position at the Dominican Church in Saint-Hyacinthe, Quebec. He remained in that post until 1894 when he became the organist at the Notre-Dame Cathedral Basilica, Ottawa. He was the organist at that church for the next 26 years during which time he also worked as a prominent organist, composer, and teacher in Ottawa. His pupils in that city included Joseph Beaulieu, Wilfrid Charette, Oscar O'Brien, and his own son, the composer George Tremblay.

In 1920 Tremblay moved to Salt Lake City, Utah to assume the post of organist at the Cathedral of the Madeleine. He left there in 1925 to become the organist at St. Vincent de Paul Church in Los Angeles. He remained at that church until his death in Los Angeles in 1949.

== Scores ==
- Free scores by Amédée Tremblay at the International Music Score Library Project (IMSLP)
