= Donald Heins =

Canadian violinist, violist, conductor, organist, composer and music educator

- Born: 19 February 1878; Hereford, England
- Died: 1 January 1949 (aged 70); Toronto, Ontario, Canada
- Occupations: violinist, violist, conductor, organist, composer, teacher

Donald Heins (19 February 1878 – 1 January 1949) was a Canadian violinist, violist, conductor, organist, composer, and music educator of English birth. He notably founded the first professional orchestra in Ottawa, the Ottawa Symphony Orchestra (no relation to the current orchestra of that name), in 1902, serving as its director until 1927. He also served in a variety of positions with the Toronto Symphony Orchestra from 1927 to 1949, including concertmaster, principal violist, and assistant conductor.

He was highly active as an educator, notably founding the instrumental music program at Ottawa's public school system and teaching on the faculties of the Canadian Conservatory of Music (1902–1927) and the Toronto Conservatory of Music (1927–1948). His compositions include several motets and anthems, some chamber music for string instruments, a small amount of orchestral music, the Saint Ursula Mass for female choir and small orchestra, and two short operettas, An Old Tortugas (1936) and Yellow Back (1939), both of which were commissioned by the Canadian Broadcasting Corporation.

== Early life and education ==
Born in Hereford, Heins was the grandson of a German piano maker who had immigrated to England. He received his musical training in Germany at the Leipzig Conservatory from 1892 to 1897, where he was a pupil of Richard Hofmann (orchestration), Gustav Schreck (harmony), and Hans Sitt (violin).

Heins returned to England in 1897, where he continued with further musical studies under August Wilhelmj for the next five years. During that time, he played in the first violin section of several orchestras, including those led by Edward Elgar and Hubert Parry. He later studied under Leopold Auer in New York City in the 1920s.

== Life in Ottawa ==
In 1902 Heins crossed the Atlantic to come to Canada, settling in Ottawa. He remained in the capital for the next 25 years, where he was a member of the faculty of the Canadian Conservatory of Music (CCM). The conservatory's founder, Harry Puddicombe, was married to his sister.

Heins notably founded the school's symphony orchestra in 1903 and served as its director through 1927. In 1910 the orchestra was restructured to become the Ottawa Symphony Orchestra. With the orchestra, Heins presented several major symphonies that had never been heard in the city of Ottawa, including works by Ludwig van Beethoven, Antonín Dvořák, Wolfgang Amadeus Mozart, and Pyotr Ilyich Tchaikovsky.

While teaching at the CCM, Heins also held an organist posts at three different Presbyterian churches in Ottawa; a career spanning a total of 23 years. In 1918 he established the first violin training program in Ottawa's public schools, enlisting a group of 14 violin teachers to forward the project. With the success of this program, he went on to establish the school's system's first student orchestra, which gave four concerts annually under his baton. He also spent three years as the conductor of the 43rd Regiment's Royal Artillery Band while in Ottawa.

== Life in Toronto ==
In 1927 Heins left Ottawa for Toronto, where he lived for the rest of his life. He taught at the Toronto Conservatory of Music from 1927 to 1948, where he notably conducted the school's symphony orchestra from 1930 to 1934. He also was the violist in the Conservatory String Quartet from 1929 to 1934. He served as concertmaster of the Toronto Symphony Orchestra (TSO) from 1927 to 1931, and was then the TSO's principal violist from 1931 to 1938. He continued to play in the viola section with the orchestra up until his death in 1949. He was the TSO's assistant conductor from 1931 to 1942. While in Toronto, he also worked at St Mary the Virgin Anglican Church as their organist. He died in Toronto at the age of 70.

== Writings ==
- Technical Devices for Violinists (1942)

== Works ==
- Country Dance (1905)
- Gloria: Violin and Pianoforte; publ. by Theo. Presser Co. Philadelphia, 1924.
- Circus Day: Violin and Pianoforte; publ. by Theo. Presser, Philadelphia, 1924.
- Puppet's Dance: Violin and Pianoforte, publ. by Oliver Ditson, Boston, 1924.
- The Dutch Family: Violin and Pianoforte (1928)
- The Bell Boy Suite: Violin and Piano (1928)
- An Old Tortugas (1936), operetta
- Yellow Black (1939), operetta
- Saint Ursula Mass, mass
- The Awakening, symphonic poem
- Blest are the Pure in Heart, anthem
