= Oscar O'Brien =

Canadian folklorist and composer (1892–1958)

Oscar O'Brien (7 September 1892 – 20 September 1958) was a Canadian folklorist, composer, pianist, organist, music educator, and Roman Catholic priest. A large portion of his compositions were based in folklore and he also arranged and harmonized roughly 400 French and Canadian folksongs; many of which were written for his collaborations with Charles Marchand and the Alouette Vocal Quartet. He worked as an arranger or accompanist on numerous 78 rpm recordings for such labels as Bluebird, Brunswick, Columbia, Starr, and Victor. He contributed numerous articles on folklore to publications like Le Canada français and was a frequent lecturer on folklore subjects. In 1978 CBC Radio recognized O'Brien in a series of six broadcasts featuring his harmonizations.

== Life and career ==
Born in Ottawa, O'Brien was a pupil of Amédée Tremblay with whom he began studying both the piano and the organ as a young teenager. At the age of 16 he was appointed Tremblay's deputy organist at the Notre-Dame Cathedral Basilica, Ottawa. He continued to study with Tremblay while taking courses as De La Salle Academy and the University of Ottawa. In 1917 he moved to Montreal where he lived and worked for the rest of his life as a teacher, orchestral pianist, and accompanist. Among his pupils were Joseph Beaulieu, Lionel Daunais, Hector Gratton, Jacques Labrecque, Allan McIver, Lucien Sicotte, and Albert Viau.

In 1915 O'Brien became Charles Marchand's accompanist and arranger, a partnership which lasted until Marchand's death in 1930. Marchand instilled a love for folk music in O'Brien and that genre of music made up much of their concert repertoire. The two men toured throughout North America together in concerts and recitals. They also made a number of recordings. In 1927 they performed music composed and arranged by O'Brien at the first CPR Festivals in Quebec. They also performed in the 1928 CPR Festivals and in 1930 O'Brien became the assistant music director of the Festivals for its final year.

From 1930 to 1945 O'Brien worked as the artistic director of the Alouette Vocal Quartet (AVQ) which included singers Roger Filiatrault (baritone), André Trottier (bass), Jules Jacob (tenor), and Émile Lamarre (bass). He wrote many of the group's arrangements of French and Canadian folksongs and the group also performed some of his original compositions. The ensemble made several recordings for Victor Records and Bluebird Records and performed on hundreds of radio broadcasts. The quartet gave regular concert tours in the United States, mainly performing in New York City, Washington D.C., Detroit, Cleveland, Chicago, and Philadelphia. In 1934 the AVQ was selected as Canada's official delegate to France for the celebrations marking the fourth centenary of the discovery of Canada. In 1937 the quartet gave 35 concerts on a tour of France and Belgium. In 1945 the quartet toured to Brazil after which O'Brien left the group.

A devout Roman Catholic, O'Brien became interested in pursuing a religious life and entered the Benedictine monastery at Saint Benedict Abbey, Quebec as a novitiate in 1945. He took his vows in 1947 and was later ordained a priest in 1952 at which time he became known as Dom Oscar O'Brien.
