= Herbert Sanders =

Canadian organist, pianist, conductor, composer, music writer and music educator

Herbert Sanders (20 September 1878 – 18 May 1938) was a Canadian organist, pianist, conductor, composer, music writer, and music educator of English birth. His compositions include numerous sacred songs, anthems, and organ works. He twice won the American Guild of Organists's Clemson Gold Medal for composition. The Canadian Musical Heritage Society recently reprinted seven of his hymns and the anthem Light's Glittering Morn. Several of his compositions are in the Catalogue of Printed Music at the British Library in London, and many of his original manuscripts are in the collection at the Library and Archives Canada.

== Life and career ==
Born in Wolverhampton, Sanders studied at the Royal College of Music (RCM) with Charles Swinnerton Heap (organ), Charles H. Kitson (theory), and Charles W. Perkins (organ). After graduating from the RCM with an associates diploma in 1896, he served as the organist at Camphill Presbyterian Church in Birmingham. He left there after a few years to work in the same capacity at St Mary's Methodist Church in Truro, Cornwall. He also played the violin in a number of orchestras while living in England.

In 1907 Sanders emigrated to Canada to assume the post of organist at Chalmers' Presbyterian in Guelph, Ontario. He left there after just one year to assume a similar role at the Dominion Methodist Church in Ottawa where he remained until 1929. While there he toured extensively throughout Canada as an organ recitalist and accompanist and served as the director of the Ottawa Oratorio Society. He was also president of the Ottawa Arts and Letters Club and worked for the Ottawa Journal as a music critic. He was hired by Harry Puddicombe to teach at the Canadian Conservatory of Music and he also ran a private teaching studio. Among his pupils were Kenneth Meek, Charles O'Neill, and Bill Richards.

Sanders relocated to Montreal in 1929 to become the music director of the newly built Tudor Hall in the J.A. Ogilvy Department Store, a position he held up until his death nine years later. At the hall he performed several noon-time organ recitals every week and also arranged for appearances by other notable artists. In 1932-1933 he was president of the Royal Canadian College of Organists (RCCO). During the 1930s he also served as the organist of Westmount Park Melville United Church. He died in Montreal in 1938 at the age of 59.

As a writer, Sanders contributed articles to numerous musical journals, including Etude, Musical Quarterly, and The American Organist. He was the associate music editor of The Methodist Hymn and Tune Book which was published in 1917; also contributing several of his own hymns to the work. He was the editor of the RCCO's bulletin which was printed in Musical Canada from 1928 to 1933.
