= George Tremblay =

Canadian musician (1911–1982)

George Amédée Tremblay (14 January 1911 – 14 July 1982) was a Canadian (and later, naturalized American citizen) pianist, composer, and author who was active in the United States. Although his works display a broad range of stylistic influences, he is primarily associated with the twelve-tone technique. He is the author of the musical treatise The Definitive Cycle of the Twelve Tone Row. Tremblay was also noted for his unique capacity to extemporize on the piano and frequently performed as an improviser.

== Biography ==
Born in Ottawa, Ontario, Tremblay was the son of composer and organist Amédée Tremblay and Rosa Martel Tremblay. As the son of an active composer and performer, young George was exposed to not only the classics, but to more contemporary composers; his father, Amédée, was an early champion of Cesar Franck, Max Reger, and Claude Debussy for Canadian audiences. In addition to receiving musical instruction from his father, Tremblay quickly learned how to extemporize at the keyboard in the style of these composers. At the age of eight Tremblay gave his first public performance, a recital for Canada's prime minister, Sir Wilfrid Laurier, in which his father performed first on pipe organ and then George performed a few small pieces and improvisations. Tremblay would continue to develop as a piano improviser for the rest of his life.

In 1920 the Tremblay family moved to Salt Lake City, Utah, when Amédée was appointed organist at the Cathedral of the Madeleine. Two years later the family would briefly live in San Diego where George, only twelve years old, worked as organist for a small Catholic church. The family moved one last time in 1925 to Los Angeles, California, where Amédée became the organist and choir director at St. Vincent de Paul Church.

In 1927 Tremblay became the student of David Patterson, the author of Tone Patterns: The Didactic Materials and Principles of Piano Technique. For five years Tremblay studied harmony, counterpoint, and composition under Patterson.

Tremblay quickly made a name for himself as a composer-improviser and public figure in Los Angeles, San Diego, and Oakland. His improvisations and compositions were a regular feature of the "Evenings on the Roof" concert series in Los Angeles. He was a recurring panel member on the Sunday evening radio quiz show, Are You Musical?, on Los Angeles station KMPC. This position helped Tremblay develop key connections with producers, writers, directors, actors, and composers.

In 1934 Tremblay's "long-standing ambition" to study under Arnold Schoenberg was realized when the composer emigrated from Europe to Los Angeles due to the rise of the Nazis under Adolf Hitler in 1933. Tremblay claims to have independently discovered the twelve-tone system of musical composition in the summer of 1933; upon telling Schoenberg, the master remarked that it was a natural thing to discover because it was the next logical development in tonality. Schoenberg, always willing to learn from his own students, supposedly was inspired to compose his Ode to Napoleon (1942) with a row of two symmetrical hexachords after hearing Tremblay's Modes of Transportation (1940) make use of a similar idea. Schoenberg is also reported to have been a great admirer of Tremblay's skill in improvising at the piano, claiming that "[Tremblay] never plays a wrong note" and advising him to simply write what he improvises. Tremblay and Schoenberg's friendship remained close and lasted until Schoenberg's death in 1951.

On 10 July 1937, Tremblay married Verabel Champion, a writer and painter. The couple remained together for nearly thirty years until divorcing in 1965.

The first meeting of the American Composers Alliance was held circa 1938 in Tremblay's home in Beverly Hills. Several important composers were in attendance, including Robert Russell Bennett, Aaron Copland, Paul Pisk, Arnold Schoenberg, Gerald Strang, Ernst Toch, and Edgar Varese. Tremblay maintained his membership with the American Composers Alliance for the rest of his life.

Tremblay was naturalized as a U. S. citizen on 8 September 1939.

In 1965 Tremblay founded the School for the Discovery and Advancement of New Serial Techniques. This school was instrumental in teaching serial techniques to film and television composers. Some of Tremblay's notable students are: Alexander Courage, Larry Fotine, Hugo Friedhofer, Earle Hagen, Quincy Jones, Richard Markowitz, Randy Newman, Marty Paich, Mel Powell, Robert O. Ragland, George Roumanis, Jack Smalley, and Mark Snow.

On 8 August 1969, Tremblay married Patricia Hedberg, a painter and one of his former piano and composition students, in Calabasas, California.

Tremblay's health began to deteriorate in 1971; he suffered a bout with cancer, two heart attacks, and cirrhosis. His composition and teaching activities were put on hold until 1975 when he became healthy enough to work again. Still, during this period of rest and recovery Tremblay managed to complete his treatise, The Definitive Cycle of the Twelve Tone Row (1974).

Tremblay died on 14 July 1982, in Tijuana, Mexico, where he was receiving treatment for cirrhosis.

== The Definitive Cycle of the Twelve Tone Row ==
The Definitive Cycle of the Twelve Tone Row (1974) is a music theory and composition treatise that is the result of Tremblay's studies in the twelve-tone serial technique. The text was originally meant to function as a brief mechanical explanation, but it soon grew in scope as Tremblay realized the wider variety of users and applications to which the book was useful. Tremblay wrote, for example, that the "examples set in these books have proved invaluable to film composers, especially in the exigencies of meeting deadlines, since it gives positive and definitive answers to technical problems of a musical nature."

Tremblay's basic explanation of The Definitive Cycle reads: "By taking a row, or a series of twelve different notes, and permutating the second six notes with the first six notes, twelve rows evolve. Taking the first note of each one of those rows successively we produce a new row, and by applying the same process of interpolating the second six with the first six, we arrive at another series of twelve rows. Each series we designate at a Set. By continuing this process for twenty-four Sets we arrive again at Set 1, completing the Cycle. All of my works since 1965 have been composed on the basis of this Cycle, most of them using an entire Cycle, which incidentally, contains 3456 notes."

Essentially, the treatise realizes "a vast immutable development of the initial row" that eschews traditional methods for developing a tone row (inversion, retrograde, and retrograde-inversion). Two of Tremblay's later works, Symphony No. 3 (ca. 1973) and The Phoenix: a Dance Symphony (1982), were composed in this manner. In fact, Tremblay described his third symphony as "a textbook in actual sound of the process of this technique."

Tremblay was working on a sequel to The Definitive Cycle before his death. The second book was meant to deal primarily with more functional applications of the definitive cycle and included topics such as osinatos, sequences, harmonization of the row, and even 12 bar blues. His wife, Patricia, and Roger Steinman, a student and friend of Tremblay, organized the materials and gave them to the University of Maryland Libraries. The notes are currently held by University of Maryland's Special Collections in the Performing Arts.

== Improvisation ==
Between 1980 and 1982 Tremblay recorded his unique improvisations as a musical autobiography. These unpublished recordings were restored and are now housed in The George Tremblay Collection at Special Collections in Performing Arts at University of Maryland. Some of the improvisations are based within a particular style (such as jazz or Baroque) while others are based upon a preexisting theme or commemorate the death of a fellow composer.

Additionally, Prologue Records released an LP containing Tremblay's improvisations on a few original themes (DL-103).

== Major works ==
=== Orchestral ===
- Symphony in One Movement, 1949
- Symphony No. 2, 1954
- Symphony No. 3, 1973
- The Phoenix: A Symphonic Ballet, 1982

=== Chamber ===
- String Quartet No. 1, 1936
- Modes of Transportation, 1939
- Wind Quintet No. 1, 1940
- In Memoriam, 1942
- Serenade for 12 Instruments, 1955
- Five Pieces for Four Players, 1964
- Sextet, 1968

=== Piano ===
- Prelude and Dance, 1935
- Two Sonatas, 1938
- Piano Sonata No. 3, 1957
