= Joseph Beaulieu =

Canadian musician

- Born: 21 May 1895; Mattawa, Canada
- Died: 1 October 1965 (aged 70); North Bay, Canada
- Occupations: Composer, Lyricist, Author, Editor, Compiler

Joseph Beaulieu (21 May 1895 – 1 October 1965) was a Canadian composer, folklorist, and music educator. He traveled extensively throughout Canada collecting folk songs, which he compiled in several published books. As a composer, his works reflect his strong interest in folk music in there structure and melody. He wrote over 200 works, most of them folk-inspired songs or sacred songs. Also of note is his operetta Le Trésor du pauvre and his mass for four mixed voices, the Vatican II Mass, which was written for ceremonies held during the Second Vatican Council. A number of his pieces have been published by La Bonne Chanson and Thompson.

== Life ==
Born in Mattawa, Ontario, Beaulieu began his musical training at the relatively late age of 20, studying piano with Oscar O'Brien and Amédée Tremblay in Ottawa. He soon after began performing in evening entertainments with his teachers and baritone Charles Marchand. With Marchand he traveled throughout the provinces of Ontario and Quebec giving concerts of folk music. During these travels, he began collecting Canadian folksongs which became a lifelong passion of his.

In the early 1920s, Beaulieu pursued further training at the Canadian Conservatory of Music where he was a student of Harry Puddicombe, ultimately joining the conservatory's faculty. After the conservatory closed in 1937, he joined the faculty of the University of Ottawa where he taught courses in piano, singing, and business. In 1942 he became a voice teacher at the Benedictines of St-Benoît-du-Lac.

In 1931 Beaulieu founded the Petits Chanteurs céciliens, a musical ensemble dedicated to performing Canadian folk music. He served as the ensemble's director through 1943 and for this group he arranged many Canadian folk songs from his collection. He published several books of Canadian folk song collections, including Chantez, les petits (Thompson 1960), the eight-volume series Mon école chante (La Bonne Chanson 1956–64), Gerbes de chansons nouvelles and Chantez petits et grands.

In 1943 Beaulieu moved to Toronto to assume the role of assistant director in charge of music education for the Ontario Ministry of Education. He remained in that post for the next 22 years. He was also highly active teaching in the North Bay area where he died in 1965 at the age of 70.
