= Jean Lallemand =

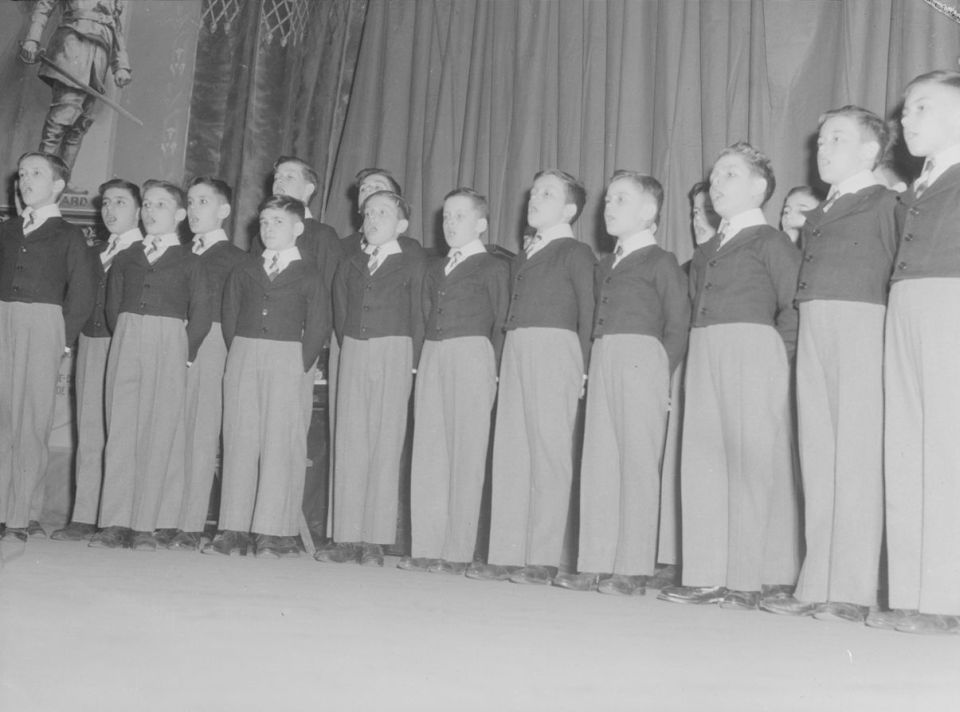
La Petite Maîtrise choir school was established by Lallemand.

Jean Lallemand (19 December 1898 - 17 November 1987) was a Canadian industrialist, philanthropist, and patron of the arts. In 1968 he was made an Officer of the Order of Canada and in 1979 he received a Canadian Music Council Medal.

Born in Montreal, Lallemand graduated from the Université de Montréal with a Bachelor of Arts in 1919. His uncle was conductor Arthur Laurendeau. He played an instrumental role in the founding of the Montreal Symphony Orchestra in 1934 and he was later named honorary president of the MSO for life. In 1936 he established an annual composition prize bearing his name, winners of which included composers Henri Miro, Hector Gratton, and Graham George. In 1938 he established the children's choir school La Petite Maîtrise de Montréal. He remained active on the boards of a number of arts organizations in Montreal up into the latter years of his life.
