= Yves Lapierre (composer) =

Canadian composer, arranger and record producer (1946–2026)

- Born: 9 August 1946; Montreal, Quebec, Canada
- Died: 26 August 2026 (aged 80)
- Occupations: Composer, arranger, record producer and singer

Yves Lapierre (9 August 1946 – 26 August 2026) was a Canadian composer, arranger, record producer and singer. He began his career performing and recording with the folk vocal quartet Les Cailloux during the 1960s. In the 1970s and 1980s he was highly active as a composer, arranger, and record producer for a large number of notable Canadian musicians. Some of his best known songs are Get That Ball, Tout va trop vite, Le Désamour, and Moi, de la tête aux pieds. He also composed music for several Canadian Broadcasting Corporation television dramas; including the Guy Fournier serials Jamais deux sans toi (1977–1980) and L'Or et le papier (1988–1989) and Lise Payette's La Bonne aventure.

== Early life ==
Born in Montreal, Lapierre was the grandnephew of composer Eugène Lapierre. A graduate of the École de musique Vincent-d'Indy, he studied conducting and instrumentation with Michel Perrault.

== Career ==
Lapierre began his career as a founding member of the folk vocal quartet Les Cailloux, which he directed from 1963 to 1968. During that time the group he toured regularly throughout the Quebec region. They also embarked on an international tour in 1967, giving performances in Europe, Africa and Asia. The ensemble released two LP albums with Pathé Records and two LPs with Capitol Records. The other members of the quartet included Jean Fortier, Jean-Pierre Goulet, and Robert Jourdain.

In 1969, Lapierre began working as an arranger for the Montreal Symphony Orchestra, making orchestral arrangements of popular music for their summer concert series into the 1970s. He also worked as a composer, arranger, and producer on recordings for a number of Canadian artists during the 1970s and 1980s, including Julie Arel, Johanne Blouin, Édith Butler, Robert Charlebois, Renée Claude, Patsy Gallant, Claude Léveillée, Suzanne Stevens, and Ginette Reno among others. He notably produced the majority of Jean Lapointe's records. He also worked as a music director for CBC Television in 1976 and 1977 for the variety programs Monsieur B and L'Heure de pointe. He also worked for the CBC as a composer of film and television scores for movies like Marcel Lefebvre's Mustang (1975) and Alain Chartrand's Ding et Dong. He has devoted most of his time after 1977 to writing jingles for radio and television.

== Death ==
Lapierre died on 26 August 2026, at the age of 80.
