= Michel Perrault =

Canadian musician (1925–2010)

Michel Brunet Perrault (20 July 1925 – 6 February 2010) was a Canadian composer, conductor, music educator, and percussionist. As a composer, his work largely pulls on Canadian folk melodies and his compositions include classical of harmony and counterpoint. Perrault has been commissioned to write works for such notable organizations as the Canadian Broadcasting Corporation, Les Grands Ballets Canadiens, and the Victoria Symphony Orchestra. From the late 1970s through the 1990s he wrote a considerable amount of music for the Gerald Danovitch Saxophone Quartet. Much of his music has been published by his own publishing company, Les Publications Bonart.

== Early life ==
Born in Montreal, Quebec, Perrault studied at McGill University under Louis Decair from 1941 to 1943. He then entered the Conservatoire de musique du Québec à Montréal where he was a pupil of Réal Gagnier from 1943 to 1944. He also studied privately with Gabriel Cusson between 1943 and 1946. He then studied in France at the École Normale de Musique de Paris with Nadia Boulanger, Georges Dandelot, and Arthur Honegger from 1946 to 1947. After returning to Canada he studied privately with Conrad Letendre.

== Career ==
Perrault served as a percussionist in the Montreal Symphony Orchestra from 1944 to 1946 and 1949–1965. He held the same post with the Little Symphony of Montreal in 1945–1946. During the 1950s and 1960s he worked in a variety of capacities for the CBC, including serving as the conductor of the CBC Montreal Orchestra and working as a composer of music for radio. In 1950 he was awarded the Radiomonde prize for his radio scores.

From 1958 to 1962 Perrault held the post of music director of Les Grands Ballets Canadiens; in 1965 the company performed his composition Suite Canadienne. In 1970 he co-founded the Institut de recherche Pantonal Inc. Among his notable pupils are Yves Lapierre and Albert Viau. In the 1980s he composed music for Gerald Danovitch and his quartet.

== Death ==
Perrault died on February 6, 2010, at the age of 84.
