= Bill Richards (musician) =

Canadian musician

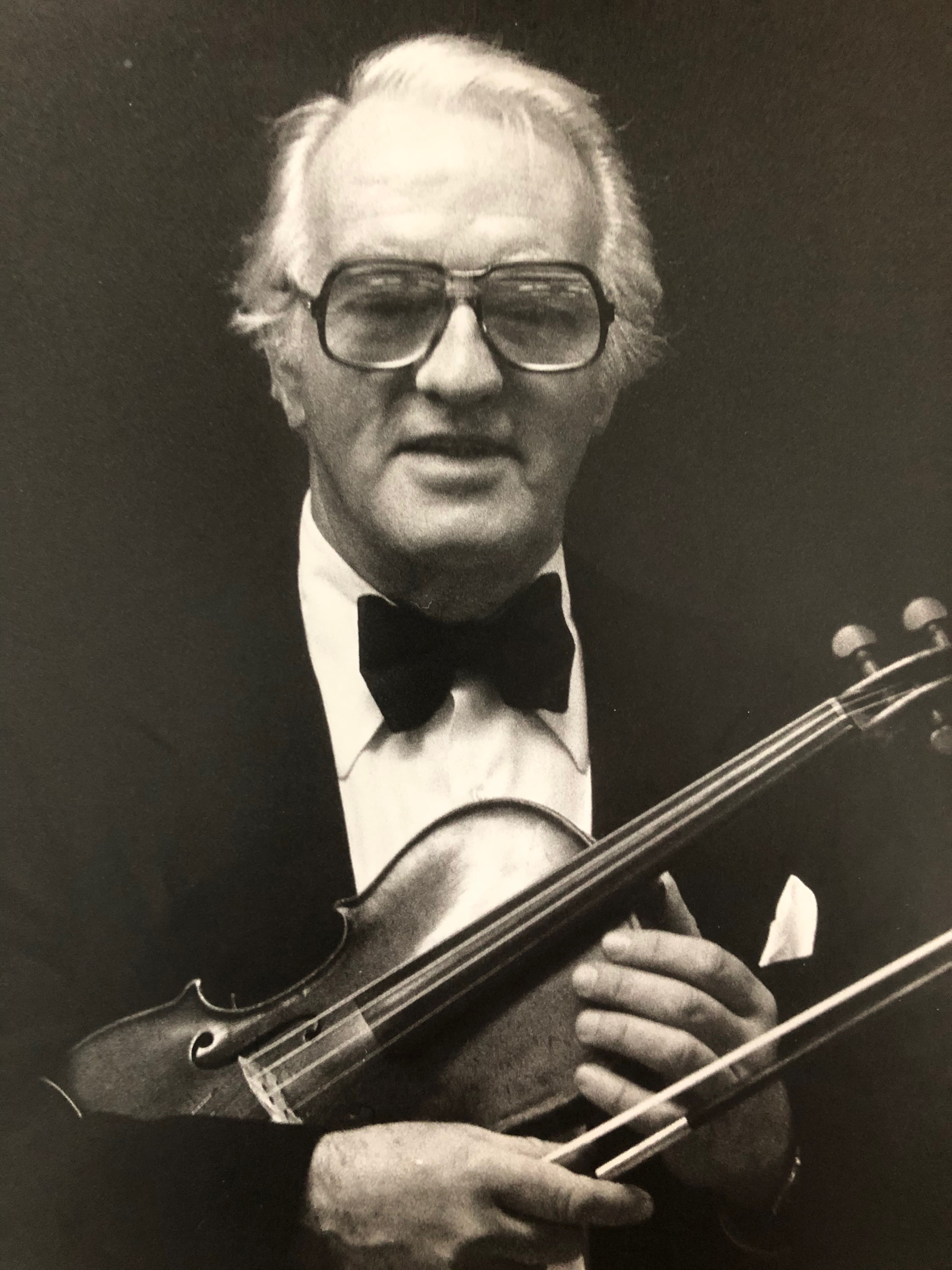
- Circa 1982. Photo: Barbara McDougall
- Born: 28 March 1923; Ottawa, Ontario, Canada
- Died: 28 February 1995 (aged 71); Toronto, Ontario, Canada
- Occupations: Violinist; composer; arranger; editor
- Years active: 1939–1995
- Spouse: Billie Mae Richards (m. 1945; div. 1966) Victoria Mae Polley (m. 1971–1995)
- Children: 5, including Judi Richards

Bill Richards (28 March 1923 – 28 February 1995) was a Canadian musician. His compositional output includes several film scores, a Flute Quartet (1964), and a number of fiddle tunes. He recorded two of his own fiddle compositions for Spiral Records in 1957 and another of his fiddle compositions was featured in the movie The Pyx. He also was active as a musician and concertmaster on a number of studio recordings from the 1950s through the 1990s, and can be heard on recordings by artists Moe Koffman, Catherine McKinnon, Anne Murray, and Gordon Lightfoot among others. In 1962 he and a quartet featuring the organist Lou Snider recorded two LP albums for the Canadian Talent Library Trust.

== Early life and education ==
Born William Francis Caven Richards in Ottawa, Ontario, Richards began his musical training as a child at the Canadian Conservatory of Music in his native city with Jack Cavill (violin) and Herbert Sanders (piano). He started his performance career at the age of eight working as a violin soloist on radio programs in Ottawa and Hull. He continued with violin studies in Ottawa with David Shuttleworth and then in Toronto with Broadus Farmer in 1939.

== Career ==
In 1942 Richards joined the Royal Canadian Navy; notably serving as a featured soloist and orchestra member for the musical revue Meet the Navy from 1943 to 1945. After World War II he pursued further violin studies in Toronto with Elie Spivak in 1946 and Albert Pratz in the mid-1950s. He married his first wife, actress Billie Mae Richards (née Dinsmore), in the mid-1940s and their daughter Judi Richards, a successful pop singer and songwriter, was born in 1949.

In 1956, Richards released his first recording on Spiral Records, "Carleton County Breakdown".

From the 1950s through the 1990s, Richards spent most of his career working in Toronto recording studios as a contractor and/or concertmaster for radio and television programs and various orchestras. For the Canadian Broadcasting Corporation he worked for a number of radio programs, serving as host and arranger for Guest Time (1954–1959), conductor and arranger for Trans-Canada Talent Show (1958–1959), and music director for Swing Easy (1959). He also composed scores for several CBC productions, including Sleeping Beauty (1957), I Knock on the Door (1968), and So Great a Sweetness (1969). In 1958 he was elected executive of the Toronto Musicians' Association (TMA) and served on the board of the organization for 25 years. He was the TMA's assistant secretary in 1960 and editor of the union's publication Crescendo from 1965 to 1977.

Richards was the concertmaster of Anne Murray's orchestra for fifteen years.

== Personal life ==
Bill Richards married voice actress Billie Mae Dinsmore in 1945 in Yorkshire, England. Together they had four children, including their daughter, Judi Richards, a singer-songwriter. He married violinist Victoria Mae Polley in 1971 and had one son together.
