= C.L.Y.D.E. =

- Genre: Science fiction
- Created by: Jean Cazes; Ronald A. Weinberg
- Story by: Alan Swayze; Gilles Taurand; Olivier Massart; Patrick Regnard; Tony Scott; Vincent James; Chris Randall; Tim O'Halloran; Tim Deacon
- Directed by: Chris Randall
- Voices of: Rick Jones; Anik Matern; Thor Bishopric; Arthur Grosser; Judi Richards; A.J. Henderson; Brian Dooley; Sonja Ball
- Composer: Leon Aronson
- Countries of origin: Canada; France
- Original languages: English; French
- No. of seasons: 1
- No. of episodes: 26

Production
- Executive producers: Micheline Charest; Jean Cazes
- Producers: Christian Davin; Ronald A. Weinberg
- Animators: James Appleton; Yannick Barbaud; Corinne Bretel; Claire De Carvalho; Didier Degand; Isabelle Faivre; Jean-Pierre Guzdziol; Philippe Lançon; Franck Marchand; Homa Niknam; Stéphane Piera; Hélène Poldervaart; Frédéric Raducanou; Valérie Schaefer; Jan Van Rijsselberge
- Running time: 25 minutes
- Production companies: CINAR Films; France Animation

Original release
- Network: TF1 (France); Family Channel (Canadian English); Global (Canadian English); YTV (Canadian English); Radio-Canada (Canadian French)
- Release: March 5, 1991 – 1991

C.L.Y.D.E. is an animated television series co-produced by France's France Animation and Canada's CINAR Animation created by CINAR's co-founder and former president Ronald A. Weinberg and veteran Canadian-French film producer Jean Cazes. It centres around a super-computer from another planet, C.L.Y.D.E. (Computer Linked Yield Driven Entity), which is put on trial for developing a virus called a "sense of humour". He is punished by being launched into space, where he enters Earth's atmosphere and crash-lands. His central core is found, intact, by two kids, Matt and Sam. They install C.L.Y.D.E. into an old jukebox, which makes him able to speak to them, and handle objects through telekinesis. Many of Matt, Sam, and C.L.Y.D.E.'s adventures concern secret agents trying to find C.L.Y.D.E., or defeating computer viruses, hackers, or invading aliens.

This cartoon was introduced into China at the end of the 1990s, and was shown on CCTV-7. The series aired in the United States on the Cookie Jar Toons block on This TV from 2009 to 2010.

== Voice cast ==
=== English version ===
- Rick Jones as C.L.Y.D.E.
- Anik Matern as Samantha
- Thor Bishopric as Matt
- Arthur Grosser as Alberto
- Judi Richards as Gaby
- A.J. Henderson as additional voices
- Brian Dooley as additional voices
- Sonja Ball as additional voices
- Terrence Scammell as additional voices (uncredited)

=== French version ===
- Jacques Ferrière : CLYDE / the green parasite
- Magali Barney : Samantha / the blue parasite
- Nicole Raucher : Matt
- Jean-Claude Donda : Alberto / the red parasite / secondary characters
- Michèle Bardollet : Gaby
- Gérard Rinaldi : secondary characters
  Dubbing artistic direction: Michel Trouillet

== Episodes ==
No.	Title	Original release date
1	"C.L.Y.D.E. Makes an Entrance"	5 March 1991
2	"Treasure of Sesemar"	1991
3	"Rock On"	1991
4	"C.L.Y.D.E. and the Poison Pen"	1991
5	"Bad Dreams"	1991
6	"Alien Brain Drain"	1991
7	"The Diabolical Dr. Hacker"	1991
8	"C.L.Y.D.E. Lends a Hand"	1991
9	"Shoot-out at the High Noon Corral"	1991
10	"Shorty, the Short Order Cook"	1991
11	"The Phantom Plane"	1991
12	"C.L.Y.D.E. and Seek"	1991
13	"The Perilous Polar Plot"	1991
14	"Al's Big Cook-off"	1991
15	"Super Matt"	1991
16	"Captain Omen"	1991
17	"A Chip Off the Old C.L.Y.D.E."	1991
18	"The Princess C.L.Y.D.E."	1991
19	"Painting by Numbers"	1991
20	"Felony Fair"	1991
21	"Heavy Weather"	1991
22	"King Klang"	1991
23	"No Place Like Home"	1991
24	"Bird Bandits"	1991
25	"Get That C.L.Y.D.E.!"	1991
26	"Double Trouble"	1991
