= Henri Miro =

Catalan-born Canadian composer (1879–1950)

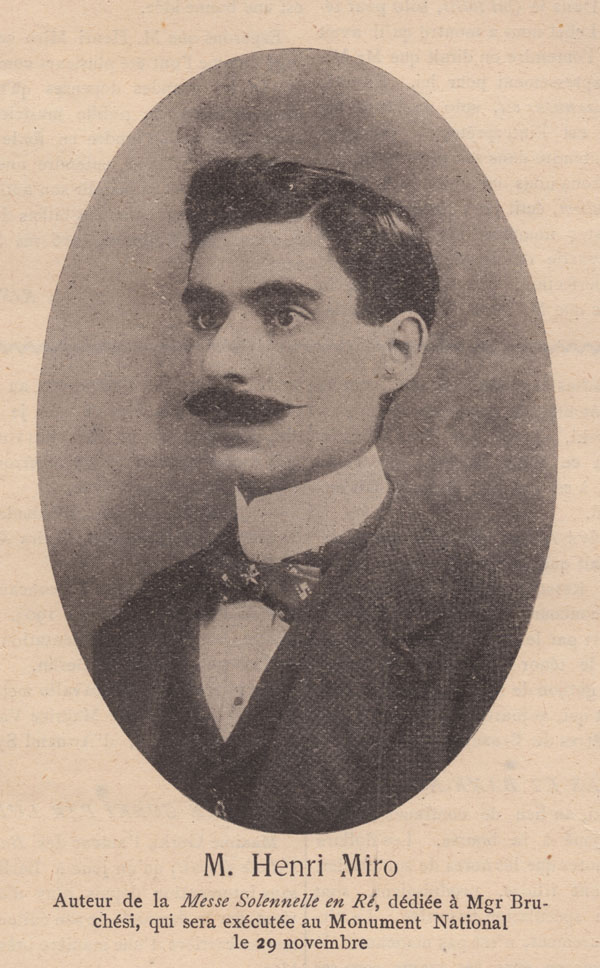
Henri Miro.jpg

Henri Enrique Miro (13 November 1879 – 19 July 1950) was a Canadian composer/arranger, conductor, pianist, and music critic of Catalan birth. He was a pioneering conductor for Canadian radio and his works were performed in all of Montreal's major performance venues of the day. He is best known for his operas, although the Montreal Symphony Orchestra did perform some of his symphonic music.

== Early life and education ==
Born in Tarrega, Spain, Miro began his musical education under Padre Domingo de Guzman at the monastery of Montserrat. In 1895 he entered the Barcelona Conservatory where he was a pupil of Bienvenido Socias y Mercadé. After earning his diploma, he moved to France in 1898 where he was director of an opera troupe for four years.

== Career ==
In 1902 Miro immigrated to Montreal where he was active as a composer/arranger, conductor, pianist, and pedagogue. His notable students included Lucio Agostini, Fleurette Beauchamp, and Rafael Masella. In 1936 he was the first winner of the Société des concerts symphoniques de Montréal composition competition for his Scènes mauresques and the work was premiered by that orchestra at Plateau Hall under the direction of Wilfrid Pelletier on 3 April 1936. He was also awarded the Jean Lallemand Prize for that composition.

In 1904 Miro's Messe solennelle premiered at the Monument-National and in 1914 his operetta Le Roman de Suzon premiered at the Princess Theatre. The latter worked was revived several times up through the late 1920s; including by the Société canadienne d'opérette in November 1925. In May 1915 his opera A Million Dollar Girl was mounted for the first time in Montreal. He wrote a second operetta, Lolita, which premiered on CBC Radio on 9 January 1944.

On 6 November 1928 Jean Goulet conducted the premiere of Miro's cantata Vox populi, which was based on 14 French-Canadian themes, at the Monument-National. Goulet also conducted the premiere of Miro's Symphonie canadienne on 27 Oct 1931. His compositions also included suites, two cello concertos, works for solo violin, and several ballads, chansons, and songs for solo voice and for choir. Many of his works were published in La Lyre for which he also worked as a music critic for several years.

From 1916 to 1921 Miro served as music director of the Berliner Gramophone Company and later worked in the same capacity at the Compo Company Ltd. In 1930–1931 he conducted a radio program dedicated to opera and operetta for the CNR Radio; notably leading performances of some of his own works. He later worked for the Canadian Broadcasting Corporation conducting for the popular Spanish music programs Sevilliana and Mexicana. He also conducted operetta performances, orchestra concerts, and on recordings for His Master's Voice and Apex Records in addition to his work as a radio conductor. He died in Montreal at the age of 70.
