= Michel Vaillant =

Comics series about a French racing car driver

- Cover of Le Grand Defi, the first title of the series

Publication information
- Publisher: Le Lombard, Novedi, Fleurus, Graton éditeur
- Format: Bande dessinée
- Publication date: 1957 - present
- Main character: Michel Vaillant

Creative team
- Created by: Jean Graton
- Written by: Jean Graton, Phillipe Graton
- Artist(s): Jean Graton, Studio Graton
- Colorist(s): Jean Graton, Studio Graton

Michel Vaillant is a French car racing comics series created in 1957 by French cartoonist Jean Graton and published originally by Le Lombard. Later, Graton published the albums by himself when he founded Graton éditeur in 1982. Michel Vaillant is the main character of the eponymous series, a French racing car driver who competes mainly in Formula One.

The feature first appeared in Tintin magazine, where Jean Graton had already published a number of short stories about real-life sporting heroes. The series appeared in Tintin between 1957 and 1976, in France as well as in Belgium. An estimated 17 million copies of the series' albums have been sold worldwide.

== Publication history ==
On February 7, 1957, Jean Graton created the character Michel Vaillant, with five short stories published in the Franco-Belgian comics magazine Tintin, with publication beginning June 12, 1957. With their positive reception, a full-length adventure was written and drawn by Graton, published in Tintin in 1959.

The titles were first published in album format by Le Lombard until 1976, then by Dargaud until 1979, by Fleurus in 1979 and 1980, by Novedi in 1981 and 1982, and finally by Graton editeur, created and owned by Philippe and Jean Graton from 1983 on. In 1995, a new series was launched, the Dossiers Michel Vaillant series, with stories and information on important figures in motorsports and the automobile industry. In 2000, the Palmarès Inedit series was created, with early works and stories previously unpublished in books. In 2007, Studio Graton translated three titles into English: "The Great Challenge" (Tome 1), "China Moon" (Tome 68), "24 Hours Under the Influence" (Tome 70). In 2008, a new collection was launched by Le Lombard, named Integrale Michel Vaillant. This series plans to reprint all past adventures in 20 volumes of 200 pages, each volume grouping several stories. All the titles of the original series are to be reprinted, and many comments, dossiers and unpublished strips added.

Jean Graton later left the writing to his son Philippe, gradually leaving the artwork to the Studio Graton, which he established. Since Graton stopped drawing the series himself, the graphic style has evolved, with Philippe Graton continuing with the writing and three artists providing the artwork. Philippe Graton admitted that the draftsmanship isn't as rigorous as it once was.

== Series overview ==
Vaillante is a family-run French business which, in the beginning, was a transporting company. They also create their own trucks and cars and so decide to enter Formula One racing competition. In 1939, Henri Vaillant, a young driver, creates this new team. In the next seventy plus adventures, Michel Vaillant and the Vaillante race team compete in numerous races in Formula One and other driving competitions such as IndyCar, rallying or enduro challenges.

Michel, Henri's son, is the main driver, his usual team-mate being the American, Steve Warson. The team is first managed by Henri Vaillant, then by Michel's older brother Jean-Pierre. Henri has remained the chairman of the Vaillante firm, but was replaced by Jean-Pierre when he retired.

As the Vaillante firm grows, Vaillante's drivers, among them Michel, accumulate victories, but their success is either disrupted by rivals, by internal problems in the Vaillante team or by the "Leader", the greatest of Vaillante's enemies. Most of the adventures deal with motor racing life, but they also deal with the Vaillante team drivers' private lives, with concerns in the Vaillante firm and with various outside problems.

== Realism ==
A Vaillante F1, designed by Michel Vaillant, as drawn by Jean Graton on the back cover of the most recent albums

The comic is notable for depicting real-life motor racing background, featuring many real-life drivers, teams and personalities. Michel Vaillant competes in existing motor races and Grand Prix on real-life circuits. In the course of the series, the background in which the characters are featured evolves: the series' environment has always been updated, so that cars, teams and personalities have constantly changed.

Graton's graphic style also aims at being realistic, as the illustrations are very technically accurate. Notably, Graton is recognized for the meticulous details he provides on cars illustrations. The numerous depictions of cars and circuits featured in the series are very specific and detailed; Graton used to personally attend races and circuits to take notes. Philippe Graton later continued this practice.

Michel Vaillant's name is very similar to that of the birth name of automotive pioneer Karl Benz, which was Karl Friedrich Michael Vaillant.

Realism is also expressed in the fictional background. Vaillant's factories and property are prominently featured in the series. The Vaillante firm is run as a real company, it has financial problems, must launch advertising campaigns and search for sponsors. It owns factories, which employs several engineers and mechanics that are realistically described and is shown employing several real-life drivers.

The Vaillants own the familial domain "La Jonquière", located a short drive / cycle ride from the factory, and is home throughout the series to Henri and Elisabeth Vaillant. Michel and Jean Pierre lived there in the early books, before striking out on their own.

As the context in which the characters evolved, Michel also is shown getting older. While he looked like a young man of about twenty years at the beginning of his adventures, he is seen progressively reaching middle-age. Recently his appearance is younger than previously. Other fictional characters are also shown getting older. In recent years, their general appearance has become steady. In spite of this he is still depicted as quite young for a man who has competed against drivers of multiple generations, including Juan Manuel Fangio, Graham Hill and Ayrton Senna.

== Characters ==

Michel Vaillant is the main character of the series. Michel Vaillant is a complete driver and sportsman. His main occupation is to drive in the Formula 1 Championship. Michel is named world champion in four different albums. He also twice won the Indianapolis 500 and the 24 Hours of Le Mans five times. He also competed in rally races, winning the East African Safari and the Paris-Dakar. He participated in several stock-car, F2, F3 and GT races.

He also drives trucks and motorcycles, and practices football, gymnastics, tennis, judo and skiing. He is popular for his character traits and abilities he possesses.

Françoise Vaillant is Michel's wife. She first appeared in 1963, as a teenager. At that time, she was a journalist for a newspaper owned by her father Louis Latour, a good friend of Henri Vaillant. In 1966, she appeared again, but as an older, attractive young woman. From that time on, she appeared in every album of the series and saw Vaillant more and more, until his family urged him to marry her. They married in 1974. Françoise has an important role in the series, and in some adventures she is the main character.

Jean-Pierre Vaillant is Michel's older brother by six years. Like Michel, he started as a driver for the Vaillante team. He married Agnès de Chanzy, the daughter of Henri Vaillant's friend living in Argentina, in the very first album. But rapidly, he became more and more interested in managing the family team and to elaborate strategies for Formula One racing. He soon became the leader of the Vaillante society, replacing his father. Able to make difficult decisions, he also does not hesitate to launch ambitious projects. He has a son, Jean-Michel Vaillant, who is Michel's godson.

Steve Warson is an American driver and Michel's best friend. He first appeared in the series in 1957. Steve has a different personality than Michel: he smokes, drinks, flirts, fights, and defies other drivers. Despite his several flaws, he is a good driver for the Vaillante team and a faithful teammate to Michel, even if his romantic adventures sometimes caused him to be Vaillante's occasional rival. His numerous girlfriends have included Ruth and Julie Wood. As good driver as Michel, he outdoes him in most rallying and American races.

The "Leader" is a mysterious character who is the worst enemy of Vaillante and owner of the Leader team. The Leader team uses modern and advanced technology to compete against the Vaillante team in motor races. The team resorts to aggressive strategies to win races and uses dangerous drivers, such as Vince Hummer, Bob Cramer, Dan Hawkins, Donald Payntor, Michael Borman, and Jack Moore. The leader was brought up by Buddhist monks. An ambitious and cruel man, he studied a form of Buddhism that gives him amazing powers, which he uses to try to dominate the motor industry. His first appearance was in the album "Mach 1 pour Steve Warson".

Ruth alias Jo Barett is the Leader's daughter and was briefly Steve Warson's girlfriend. Before knowing her real origin, Ruth was a kind girl and friendly towards the Vaillante team. She became cruel and mean, taking over as the new Leader at her father's death, and tried to avenge him by fighting against his enemies.

Henri Vaillant is Michel and Jean-Pierre's father. He began as a mechanic, then became a driver, created his own team and then became chairman of Vaillante. Rather authoritarian, he gave his two children a strict education. Later, he let his son Jean-Pierre take over as the leader and retired. His way of life remains modest, as chairman he went to work on a bicycle. A respectable man, close to his employees, he is very appreciated by them.

Elisabeth Vaillant is Henri Vaillant's wife. She married him when he was a simple mechanic, but does not know anything about cars, motor racing, or mechanics.

Julie Wood is an American motorcycle racer and at one time Steve Warson's girlfriend. An orphan, she was brought up by her uncle Chris, in California, with her two brothers, Indy and Phil. She is at ease in any kind of motorcycle race. Before her appearance in the Michel Vaillant series (in the album "Paris-Dakar"), she starred in her own series, Julie Wood, which ran for eight volumes, from 1976 to 1980.

Yves Douleac is a driver for the Vaillante team. He lost his father, a truck driver for Vaillante at Marseille, at 7. He was brought up by his mother and he was very admirative of Michel Vaillant, getting to know him personally and being employed as a driver. Courageous and proud, he later fell in love with Gabriele Spangenberg, and succeeded in marrying her despite his modest origin.

Gabriele Spangenberg is a German female driver for the Vaillante team and Yves Douléac's girlfriend. Her father, of noble heritage, first opposed such a union, due to Yves's poor origin, but later gave his permission, in the face of Gabriele's determination.

Bob Cramer is an American driver, Vaillante's enemy and a driver for the Leader team along with his friend and partner Dan Hawkins. A drunkard and a brawler, he is also aggressive in motor races where he caused a lot of crashes.

Non-fictional characters
As a driver evolving in the motor racing background, Michel Vaillant competes with many existing drivers, some of whom play an important part in the stories. Pierre Dieudonné appeared in some adventures as a driver for the Vaillante team. Drivers, most notably French and Belgians like Vanina and Jacky Ickx, François Cevert, Patrick Tambay, Thierry Boutsen, René Arnoux, Jean-Pierre Beltoise and Éric Bernard, have made appearances in the storylines.

Gilles Villeneuve and Jacky Ickx are portrayed as good friends of Michel's as is Didier Pironi, and are the most recurring drivers of the series. Didier Pironi played an important part in the album: Un pilote a disparu (1980). Non-fictional team managers and journalists also appear regularly, as do some statesmen and celebrities. Michel himself is often seen being interviewed by real-life journalist Gérard "Jabby" Crombac.

== Publications ==
- Volume 1 : The Big Challenge (1959)
- Volume 2 : The faceless pilot (1960)
- Volume 3 : The Circuit of fear (1961)
- Volume 4 : Night Road (1962)
- Volume 5 : The 13 is at the start (1963)
- Volume 6 : The Treason of Steve Warson (1964)
- Volume 7 : The Daredevils (1964)
- Volume 8 : The 8th pilot (1965)
- Volume 9 : The return of Steve Warson (1965)
- Volume 10 : The Honor of the Samurai (1966)
- Volume 11 : Suspense in Indianapolis (1966)
- Volume 12 : The Knights of Königsfeld (1967)
- Volume 13 : Concerto for pilots (1968)
- Volume 14 : Mach 1 for Steve Warson (1968)
- Volume 15 : The infernal circus (1969)
- Volume 16 : Km. 357 (1969)
- Volume 17 : The ghost of the 24 Hours (1970)
- Volume 18 : Oil on the track (1970)
- Volume 19 : 5 girls in the race (1971)
- Volume 20 : Rodeo on 2 wheels (1971)
- Volume 21 : Massacre for an Engine (1972)
- Volume 22 : Rush (1972)
- Volume 23 : Black Series (1973)
- Volume 24 : Nightmare (1973)
- Volume 25 : Girls and Engines (1974)
- Volume 26 : World Champion (1974)
- Volume 27 : In the Hell of the Safari (1975)
- Volume 28 : The Secret of Steve Warson (1975)
- Volume 29 : San Francisco Circus (1976)
- Volume 30 : The Young Wolves (1977)
- Volume 31 : The Revolt of the kingd (1978)
- Volume 32 : The white prince (1978)
- Volume 33 : The Angry Figure (1979)
- Volume 34 : KO for Steve Warson (1979)
- Volume 35 : The Galley Slave (1980)
- Volume 36 : A Pilot has disappeared (1980)
- Volume 37 : The Man of 1000 Tracks (1980)
- Volume 38 : Steve Warson VS Michel Vaillant (1981)
- Volume 39 : Rally on a Volcano (1981)
- Volume 40 : Fistcuffs in F1 (1982)
- Volume 41 : Paris-Dakar (1982)
- Volume 42 : 300 MPH in Paris (1983)
- Volume 43 : Rendezvous at Macao (1983)
- Volume 44 : Steve and Julie (1984)
- Volume 45 : The Man from Lisbon (1984)
- Volume 46 : Racing Show (1985)
- Volume 47 : Panic in Monaco (1986)
- Volume 48 : Irish Coffee (1986)
- Volume 49 : Heavy-Duty Category (1987)
- Volume 50 : The Challenge of the Remparts (1988)
- Volume 51 : The boss of Francorchamps (1989)
- Volume 52 : F3000 (1989)
- Volume 53 : The Night of Carnac (1990)
- Volume 54 : The Bugatti Affair (1991)
- Volume 55 : A Crazy Story (1992)
- Volume 56 : The Master of the World (1993)
- Volume 57 : The Jade Trail (1994)
- Volume 58 : Paddock (1995)
- Volume 59 : The Prisoner (1997)
- Volume 60 : Forgotten Victories (1997)
- Volume 61 : Bercy Fever (1998)
- Volume 62 : The Sponsor (1999)
- Volume 63 : Cairo (2000)
- Volume 64 : Operation Mirage (2001)
- Volume 65 : The Test (2003)
- Volume 66 : $100,000,000 for Steve Warson (2004)
- Volume 67 : For David (2005)
- Volume 68 : China Moon (2006)
- Volume 69 : Off-road In Hell (2006)
- Volume 70 : 24 Hours under the Influence (2007)

New series

- Volume 1 : In the name of the Son (2012)
- Volume 2 : Charge (2013)
- Volume 3 : Beyond Control (2014)
- Volume 4 : Collapse (2015)
- Volume 5 : Renaissance (2016)
- Volume 6 : Rebellion (2017)
- Volume 7 : Macau (2018)
- Volume 8 : 13 Days (2019)
- Volume 9 : Duels (2020)
- Volume 10 : Pikes Peak (2021)
- Volume 11 : Cannonball (2022)
- Volume 12 : Target (2023)
- Volume 13 : Redemption (2024)
- Volume 14 : Remparts (2025)
- Volume 15 : Double or Nothing Part 1 (2027)
- Volume 16 : Double or Nothing Part 2 (2027)

In 1986, the album Irish coffee was awarded the Avoriaz Festival's Grand Prix (Morzine, France).

== In other media ==
In 1967, French TV broadcast a live-action adaptation of the series, Les Aventures de Michel Vaillant. It ran for 13 episodes and featured stories written and filmed around a real-life world sportscar championship, documenting Henri Grandsire driving an Alpine A110, interspersed with dramatic interludes acted by Grandsire himself. Episodes offer rare close-up contemporary footage of races and cars that year at the Rallye Du Nord, Magny Cours, Nürburgring, Monza, Targa Florio, Le Mans, Monaco, Rouen-Les-Essarts, Sebring and Reims.

The series was also adapted into a Michel Vaillant animated series. 65 episodes of 26 minutes were produced in 1990 in France by la Cinq. It was released in the U.S. in 1991-1992 as Heroes on Hot Wheels, produced by Jetlag Productions and the former Family Channel, sponsored by Mattel's Hot Wheels franchise (hence the title) and distributed by France 3 Video and Pacific Media Ventures. Michel's name was anglicized to "Michael Valiant". It was broadcast again in France in 1993 and 1998 by France 2, and sold in more than 30 countries.

A Michel Vaillant film was made in 2003, and the soundtrack to the movie composed by the band Archive was released at the same time.

== In popular culture ==
A Dutch poster celebrating the 50th anniversary of the series in 2007

The series has been influential in the world of auto racing. Some famous Formula One drivers have admitted that their passion for automobile racing originated from reading the Michel Vaillant comics series, among them four- time Formula One champion Alain Prost. In 1969, Henry Ford II and Enzo Ferrari personally wished Michel Vaillant a happy 20th birthday. The circuit Zolder, in Belgium, in which several well-known motorsport races take place, have paid tribute to the series, naming the biggest building of the circuit "Michel Vaillant club".

Many real cars were adapted from automobile designs from the series. Cars bearing the logo Vaillante ran in Le Mans in 1997 and 2003: A Courage in 1997, while in 2003, Vaillante cars have been designed to be used in the Luc Besson's movie. Some fans have built a real Vaillante Grand Defi, a model which appeared several times in the comics series. The car has participated in real races, under the brand Vaillante. A model was marketed in Belgium, the Honda Civic Vaillante, of which 50 models have been produced. Automobile designer Luc Donckerwolke (current designer of Lamborghini, previously of SEAT) has drawn his inspiration from cars drawn by Jean Graton to design some real car models. He also designed the SEAT Ibiza Vaillante, exhibited at the Geneva Motor Show in 2006. It was also Luc Donckerwolke who transformed a Lola B98/10–Judd into a Vaillante and a Panoz LMP-1 Roadster-S into a Leader car in 2003 for the Besson movie. Donckerwolke also collaborated with Studio Graton on the latest titles of the series, drawing some cars featured in the albums.

Many commercial products have been derived from the series, among them figurines, collected by automobile fans as well as comics fans. There's also a video game featuring Michel Vaillant which has ranked first in the auto racing video games in Benelux, and has been the top download on commercial websites.

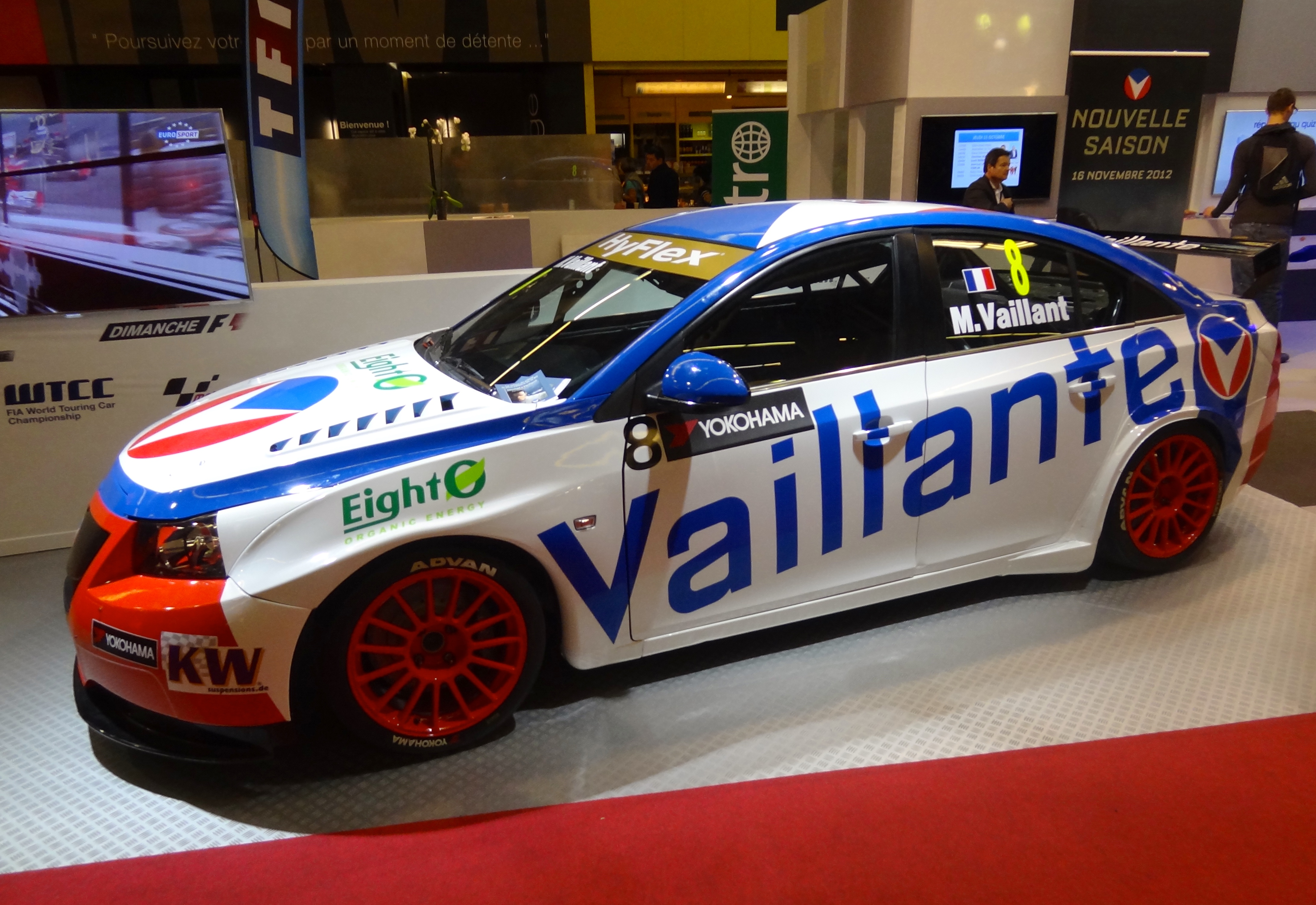
Alain Menu's Vaillant color Chevrolet Cruze 1.6T

In June 2012, Swiss racing driver Alain Menu competed in the World Touring Car Championship Race of Portugal with a Vaillante-themed livery. Menu won the second feature race of the event (round 14) under the name M. Vaillant, even dying his hair and shaving his beard to resemble the look of the character.

In 2017 Rebellion Racing entered the 2017 FIA World Endurance Championship, including the 24 Hours of Le Mans as "Vaillant Rebellion" using Vaillant colours on cars #13 and #31.

== Reception ==
The series is very popular among fans of automobiles, because it features real-life cars, including renowned and prestigious models. The series have fans throughout several countries, though it has not translated into other languages except for English, Dutch, German, Danish, Norwegian (with Michel Vaillant renamed Mark Breton in the two latter), Portuguese, Serbian, Croatian, Finnish and Italian. It has above all fans in France and Belgium, including Dutch-speaking Belgium, given that Michel Vaillant albums have been translated into Dutch.

The series has received various tributes as a masterpiece of the bande dessinée genre.

A stamp representing Michel Vaillant was published in Belgium, a rare privilege granted only to the greatest comics series'. It was made available from January 1, 2007 with a face value of 0.50 euros, in all Belgian post offices. Celebrations for the 50th anniversary of the series took place in 2007, among them Strip Turnhout, at the bi-annual official Flanders comics festival, organizing a retrospective exhibition.

In 2025 it is the French Post Office that edited a bloc of 4 stamps of a face value of 2,10€ each as a tribute to the Serie. The bloc was edited at 330000 units, and a special souvenir edition of the stamps at 20000 units. The first Day cover was the 19 of September 2025 in the city of Angoulême with a stamp designed by Agence Arobace, for the opening of the exhibition "Michel Vaillant et les remparts" (Michel Vaillant and the Ramparts) at the Museum of Angoulême, from 19th of September to 5th of October 2025.

The series also ranks high on the collector's market, with original editions ranking among the most valuable. Graton's original art pages have fetched high prices at auctions. In January 2006, a page from "Le 13 est au départ" was sold for 4,800 euros at an auction in Paris. In April 2006, in Paris again, an original page from "L'Honneur du Samourai" was auctioned for 12,384 euros (whereas its original value was 3,500 euros), breaking the record of the time. In 2008, an original page from "De l'huile sur la piste" was sold for 11,520 euros at auction in 2008 at Brussels among other works previously published by Tintin magazine, establishing the record sale of that day.

== See also ==
- Sports Portal
