= Gladys Ewart =

Canadian pianist (1892–1957)

Gladys Ewart (1892 – 19 July 1957) was a Canadian pianist and music educator.

Gladys Ewart was born in Ottawa to John S. Ewart and Jessie Campbell Ewart. She studied with Harry Puddicombe at the Canadian Conservatory of Music in Ottawa, with Alexander Siloti in New York City, and with Martinus Sieveking in London. She was active as a concert pianist in North America during the 1920s through the 1940s and made numerous appearances as a soloist with the Ottawa Symphony Orchestra. She also was active as an accompanist during these years, playing in recitals and in concerts with such notable artists as Ernestine Schumann-Heink and Frances Alda. She ran a piano studio for many years in her native city. Among her notable pupils was pianist Evelyn Greenberg. She died in Ottawa in 1957.
