= Alphonse Martin =

Canadian classical musician

Alphonse Martin (18 February 1884 – 6 June 1947) was a Canadian organist, pianist, and music educator. Born in Trois-Rivières, he studied the piano and organ in Montreal with Lévis Dussault. For many years he taught both of those instruments at the Conservatoire royal de musique in Montreal. His notable pupils included Hector Gratton and Rodolphe Mathieu. He also was the longtime organist of St Mary's Church in Montreal. His wife was the organist and teacher Corinne Boisvert with whom he performed in public concerts in Canada.

The couple had several daughters which had significant music careers, including pianists Gilberte Martin, Marcelle Martin, Magdeleine Martin, and Raymonde Martin. He died in Montreal 6 June 1947.
