= Judi Richards =

Canadian musician

- Born: 12 August 1949 (age 75); Toronto, Ontario, Canada
- Occupation(s): Pop singer, songwriter
- Years active: 1969–present
- Spouse: Yvon Deschamps (m. 1971)
- Children: 3
- Parent(s): Billie Mae Richards (mother); Bill Richards (father)

Judith "Judi" Richards (born 12 August 1949) is a Canadian pop singer and songwriter.

Born in Toronto, Richards is the daughter of musician Bill Richards and actress Billie Mae Richards (née Dinsmore). She has sung numerous jingles for the Canadian Broadcasting Corporation in Montreal and has performed in concert and on record with a variety of notable Quebec-based pop artists. In the late 1970s she was a member of the bilingual vocal trio Toulouse with Liette Lomez and Laurie Zimmerman, and the ensemble notably recorded a number of Richards's songs.

The group became well known for "It Always Happens This Way"/"C'est toujours à recommencer" and won a total of four Félix Awards. She has sung backup on numerous other artists' records. She has three solo French albums to her credit, and she cowrote many of the songs. Her first album, Touche Pas, won a Felix award for best country folk album.

Richards has also lent her voice to several animated television series such as Saban's Adventures of the Little Mermaid, C.L.Y.D.E., Young Robin Hood and Favourite Songs.

She has three daughters with author, actor, comedian and producer Yvon Deschamps to whom she has been married since 1971.
