= Canadian Conservatory of Music =

Music conservatory in Ottawa, Ontario, Canada

Coordinates: 42.2552°N 82.9733°W

The Canadian Conservatory of Music was a music conservatory in Ottawa, Ontario, Canada, that was actively providing higher education in music during the first half of the 20th century.

== History ==
Founded by Harry Puddicombe in 1902, the school was located on Bay Street. The building was designed by Edgar Lewis Horwood. Puddicombe's brother-in-law, Donald Heins, founded the conservatory's student orchestra in 1903 which eventually became Ottawa's first professional orchestra in 1910, the Ottawa Symphony Orchestra (no relation to the current orchestra of that name). Some of the schools notable pupils and faculty members include composers Joseph Beaulieu, Gladys Ewart, Johana Harris, Bill Richards, and Herbert Sanders; and pianists Yvon Barette, Annie Jenkins, and Hélène Landry. The school closed in 1937, when the school's building was acquired by the municipality of Ottawa to meet the expanding public school systems needs.

== See also ==
- Category:Academic staff of the Canadian Conservatory of Music
