= Primary Schools Music Festival =

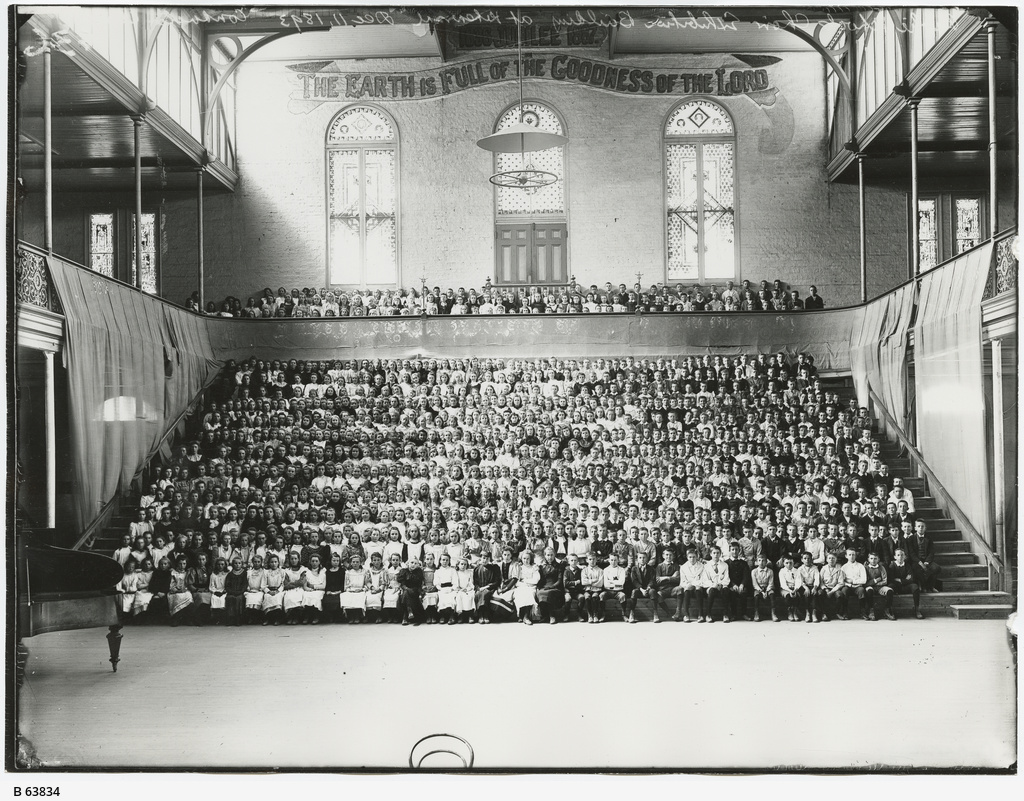
Members of the Public Schools Choir rehearsing in the Exhibition Building, Adelaide, 11 December 1893.

Operating since 1891 and a State Icon, The Festival of Music is a joint venture of the South Australian Public Primary Schools' (SAPPS) Music Society and the Department for Education.

This school-based music education program culminates in performances at the Adelaide Festival Centre and in ten regional centres.

The Festival of Music provides opportunities for students to perform in:

choirs,
orchestras,
troupes,
as Hosts/soloists,
as Guest Artists,
as choreography leaders.

== History ==
- 1891 founded by Alexander Clark as the Public Schools Decoration Society
- 1921 Frank Gratton succeeds Inspector William John McBride as conductor of the public schools concerts, Thousand Voice Choir.
