= Johana Harris =

Canadian pianist, composer and music educator

Johana Harris (31 December 1912 – 5 June 1995) was a Canadian pianist, composer, and music educator. She had highly successful career as a concert pianist, making numerous recordings and appearing as a soloist with almost every major American symphony orchestra. She made over 100 solo recordings, working with such labels as Columbia, RCA, Capitol, MGM and Contemporary Records. She also performed on the soundtracks of several Hollywood films and television productions.

She was married to composers Roy Harris (died 1979) and Jake Heggie (married 1982). She performed widely with both men in duo piano concerts and was considered to have had a particularly profound effect on Roy Harris's work as a composer.

== Life ==
Born Beula Duffey in Ottawa, she was a child prodigy and began her career as a concert pianist at the age of 8. At that time she had already been composing for some years and performed her own works along with works from the standard piano repertoire. She soon after began studying with Bertha Laverde Worden and Harry Puddicombe at the Canadian Conservatory of Music. In 1923 she turned down a full scholarship to the Hambourg Conservatory in Toronto, choosing instead to study with Ernest Hutcheson in New York City at the urging of Puddicombe.

Harris entered the Juilliard School in 1925 where she was concurrently a student and faculty member. She was appointed Hutcheson's teaching assistant and at 17 was the youngest faculty member in Juilliard history. She earned a scholarship there in 1927. At Juilliard she studied music composition with Rubin Goldmark and continued her piano studies with Hutcheson. She went on to teach on the faculties of 17 other universities and conservatories, most notably working on the faculty at the University of California, Los Angeles from 1969 to 1993. In 1987 she was awarded UCLA's Distinguished Lecturer Award.

In 1936 Harris married composer Roy Harris. It was he who convinced her to change her name to Johana after J.S. Bach. The Canadian Encyclopedia states, "Johana and Roy Harris were a tour de force in American music. Their collaboration has been compared to that of Robert and Clara Schumann. The Harrises organized concerts, adjudicated at festivals, and in 1959 founded the International String Congress. They promoted American folksong by including folksongs in their concerts and broadcasts." Johana's biographer Louise Spizizen believed that Johana had composed parts of music published under Roy Harris' name. The couple had three daughters, Patricia, Maureen and Lane, as well as two sons, Shaun and Dan, who performed with The West Coast Pop Art Experimental Band, a Los Angeles-based psychedelic rock band of the late 1960s.

She died on 5 June 1995, at her home in Los Angeles. She was 82.
