= Hector Gratton =

Canadian musician (1900–1970)

- Born: Joseph Thomas Hector Gratton; 13 August 1900; Hull, Quebec
- Died: 16 July 1970 (aged 69); Montreal, Quebec

Joseph Thomas Hector Gratton (13 August 1900 – 16 July 1970) was a Canadian composer, arranger, conductor, pianist, and music educator. As a composer his music is written in an essentially folkloric and popular style which avoids harmonic sophistication. His compositional output includes several orchestral works, chamber works, and works for solo piano. He also wrote 4 ballets and a considerable amount of music for radio programs. In 1937 his symphonic poem Légende won the Jean Lallemand Prize which led to the work's premiere performance that year by the Montreal Symphony Orchestra under conductor Wilfrid Pelletier. The work was repeated by the orchestra in concerts the following year under conductor Sir Ernest MacMillan.

== Life and career ==
Born in Hull, Quebec (now Gatineau, Quebec), Gratton studied music theory and composition with Albertine Morin-Labrecque, Oscar O'Brien, and Alfred Whitehead. He was a piano student of Alphonse Martin and Alfred La Liberté. From La Liberté he gained a great appreciation for the works and aesthetics of Nikolai Medtner and Alexander Scriabin, two composers which influenced his own compositional style.

During the 1920s, Gratton toured with Charles Marchand performing folk music that was harmonized by O'Brien. He notably performed in concerts with Marchand at the CPR Festivals between 1927 and 1930. He soon after began working for the Canadian Broadcasting Corporation during the early years of national radio. He composed and conducted music for Je me souviens, one of the first major Canadian radio series which featured scripts by Félix Leclerc. Also notable among his compositions for CBC Radio was the incidental music for Cécile Chabot's 1945 Christmas story L'Imagerie.

Gratton died in Montreal in 1970 at the age of 69. He was made an associate of the Canadian Music Centre posthumously. Several of his original manuscripts are part of the collection at the Library and Archives Canada.
