= Sarah Gratton =

British author (born 1966)

- Born: Sarah-Jayne Camden; 1966 (age 59–60); Cambridge, England
- Occupation: Author
- Website: www.sarahjaynegratton.com

Sarah-Jayne Gratton (born 1966 in Cambridge, England) is a producer, author and a former theatre performer.

== Early life ==
Gratton attended the Shrubbery school and the King Slocombe Stage school in Cambridge, which led to her appearance on BBC Look East, a regional television talent show in the late 1970s. From there, Gratton went on to perform at the Cambridge Arts Theatre, the Prince of Wales Theatre, London and Caesar's Palace, Luton in the early 1980s.

A former actress, Gratton was a columnist for Women's Business Magazine (Teallach Publications Ltd.) in the late 1990s and was elected as President of the Women in Business Society for both UK and Europe in 2000.

== Current activities ==
Gratton has since become an influential social media persona, speaker and writer, being a contributor to Social Media Today and other publications including In-Spires Lifestyle Magazine and blogcritics.org.

== Personal life ==
Gratton is married to the author and columnist Dean Anthony Gratton.

== List of works ==
- Playing God with Artificial Intelligence: Could Our Greatest Creation Lead to Our Final Downfall?, Camden Media, 2024 (ISBN 2361226936)
- Follow Me! Creating a Personal Brand with Twitter, John Wiley & Sons, 2012 (ISBN 1118336348)
- Zero to 100,000: Social Media Tips and Tricks for Small Businesses, Que (an imprint of Pearson Education), 2011 (ISBN 0789748002)
- Marketing Wireless Products, Butterworth–Heinemann (an imprint of Elsevier), 2004 (ISBN 075065936X)
