= Alexander Siloti =

Russian pianist, conductor and composer (1863–1945)

Alexander Siloti Александр Зилоти
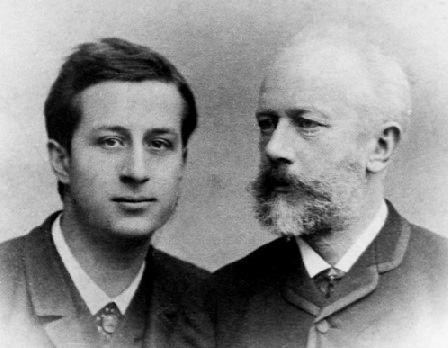
- Siloti (left) with Tchaikovsky (right)

Background information
- Born: October 9, 1863; Kharkov, Russian Empire
- Died: December 8, 1945 (aged 82) New York City, U.S.
- Occupations: Pianist; conductor; composer

Alexander Ilyich Siloti (Note: Russian: Александр Ильич Зилоти, romanized: Aleksandr Ilyich Ziloti; Ukrainian: Олександр Ілліч Зілоті, romanized: Oleksandr Illich Ziloti) (also Ziloti; Russian: Александр Ильич Зилоти; 9 October 1863 – 8 December 1945) was a Russian virtuoso pianist, conductor, composer and arranger.

== Biography ==
Alexander Siloti was born on his father's estate near Kharkov in the Russian Empire (present-day Ukraine). He studied piano at the Moscow Conservatory with Nikolai Zverev from 1871, then from 1875 under Nikolai Rubinstein, brother of the more famous Anton Rubinstein; from that year he also studied counterpoint under Sergei Taneyev, harmony under Pyotr Ilyich Tchaikovsky, and theory under Nikolai Hubert. He graduated with the gold medal in Piano in 1881. He received some lessons from Anton Rubinstein after the death of Rubinstein's brother, Nikolai. After Siloti's graduation it was decided that he would be sent to Weimar, Germany on scholarship to further his studies with Franz Liszt, co-founding the Liszt-Verein in Leipzig, and making his professional debut on 19 November 1883. Returning to Russia in 1887, Siloti taught at the Moscow Conservatory, where his students included Aleksandr Goldenweiser, Konstantin Igumnov, Leonid Maximov, and his first cousin Sergei Rachmaninoff. During this period he also began work as editor for Tchaikovsky, particularly on the First and Second piano concertos.

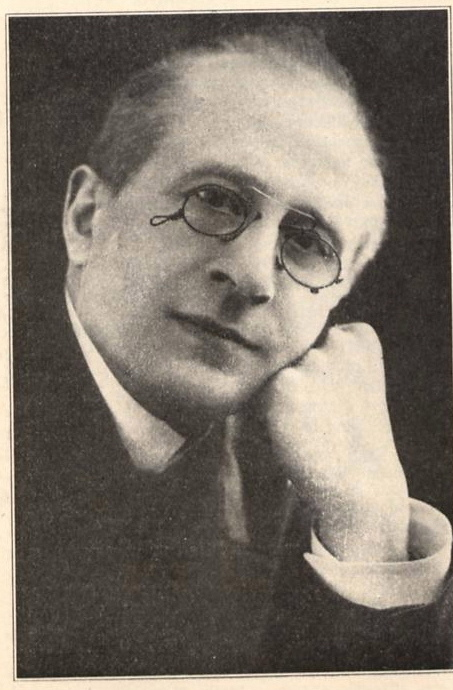
Photoportrait of Alexander Siloti from page 299 of the May 1922 issue of "The Etude" Magazine.

Siloti married Vera Tretyakova, herself a pianist and the daughter of the wealthy industrialist and art collector Pavel Tretyakov. He left his post at the Conservatory in May 1891, and from 1892 to 1900 lived and toured in Europe with his wife and young children. He also toured New York City, Boston, Cincinnati and Chicago in 1898. As a conductor Siloti gave the world premiere of Rachmaninoff's Piano Concerto No. 2 with the composer as soloist in 1901. From 1901 to 1903, he led the Moscow Philharmonic; from 1903 to 1917, he organized, financed, and conducted the influential Siloti Concerts in St Petersburg, collaborating with the critic and musicologist Alexander Ossovsky. He presented Leopold Auer, Pablo Casals, Feodor Chaliapin, George Enescu, Josef Hofmann, Wanda Landowska, Willem Mengelberg, Felix Mottl, Arthur Nikisch, Arnold Schoenberg and Felix Weingartner, and local and world premieres by Debussy, Elgar, Glazunov, Prokofiev, Rachmaninoff, Rimsky-Korsakov, Scriabin, Sibelius, Stravinsky and others. Ballet impresario Sergei Diaghilev first heard Stravinsky's music at one of the Siloti Concerts.

In the generation prior to 1917, Siloti was one of Russia's most important artists, with music by Arensky, Lyadov, Blumenfeld, Szymanowski, Liszt, Rachmaninoff, Stravinsky, Taneyev and Tchaikovsky dedicated to him. In 1918, Siloti was appointed Intendant of the Mariinsky Theatre, but late the following year fled what had become Soviet Russia for England, finally settling in New York City in December 1921. From 1925 to 1942 he taught at the Juilliard School, performing occasionally in recital, and in November 1930 gave a legendary all-Liszt concert with Arturo Toscanini. His many students included Ilmari Hannikainen, Bertha Melnik, Marc Blitzstein, Gladys Ewart, Josef Raieff and Eugene Istomin.

Siloti, who was one of the great practitioners of the art of transcription, wrote over 200 of these arrangements, as well as orchestral editions of the music of Bach, Beethoven, Liszt, Tchaikovsky and Vivaldi. Possibly his most famous transcription is the Prelude in B minor, based on a keyboard prelude by J. S. Bach. As a pianist Siloti made 8 piano rolls and 26 minutes of home-recorded discs. Carl Fischer has published a large anthology of his piano transcriptions, and Rowman and Littlefield has published the first full-scale Alexander Siloti biography. In 2014, the Alexander Siloti Archive at Stanford University was donated by author and alumnus Charles Barber. In six linear feet, it contains all of the correspondence, documentation, music and manuscripts acquired for the writing of the Siloti biography called Lost in the Stars, and for publication of the 'Alexander Siloti Collection' of piano music.

His daughter, Kyriena Siloti, was a noted pianist and teacher in New York and Boston until her death in 1989, aged 94.

Alexander Siloti is buried at the Russian Orthodox Convent Novo-Diveevo Cemetery, Nanuet, New York.

== Sources ==
- "Зилоти, Александр Ильич" . Brockhaus and Efron Encyclopedic Dictionary (in Russian). 1906.
- Barber, Charles F. (2002). Lost in the Stars: The Forgotten Musical Life of Alexander Siloti. Lanham, Maryland: Scarecrow Press. ISBN 0-8108-4108-8.
- C. Barber, editor. "The Alexander Siloti Collection". New York, New York: Carl Fischer, 2003. ISBN 978-0825847301
- S. Bertensson. "Knight of Music." Etude 64:369, July 1946.
- B. Dexter. "Remembering Siloti, A Russian Star." American Music Teacher, April/May 1989.
- J. Gottlieb. "Remembering Alexander Siloti." Juilliard Journal, November 1990.
- L.M. Kutateladze and L.N. Raaben, eds., Alexander Il'yich Ziloti, 1863-1945: vospominaniya i pis'ma (Leningrad, 1963)
- R.-A. Mooser. "The Siloti Concerts" in The Russian Life of R.-Aloys Mooser, Music Critic to the Tsars: Memoirs and Selected Writings (Edwin Mellen Press: Lewiston, Queenston, Lampeter, 2008), pp. 149–172.
- Moscow Conservatory of Music. "Alexander Ilich Ziloti (1863-1945)". Moscow, 2016. Published in commemoration of Ziloti and his career at the Conservatory. [In Russian] ISBN 978-5-89598-318-8
- A. Ziloti. Moi vospominaniya o F. Liste (St Petersburg, 1911; My Memories of Liszt, Eng. trl. Edinburgh, 1913 and New York, 1986).
- Siloti, Vera P. (1998). В доме Третьякова (in Russian). Moscow: Iskusstvo. ISBN 5-210-01321-9. OCLC 28635198.

Documents

- Alexander Siloti Archive at Stanford: letters, photographs, diaries, memorabilia, music, research documents, Siloti Concert programmes, translations, family and professional documents. Deposited by author Charles Barber in 2014
- Alexander Siloti Collection at Univ of Maryland, College Park: music, scores, performance files, correspondence, books/notebooks, and miscellaneous documents. Deposited for daughter Kyriena Siloti after her death in 1989
- Letters by Alexander Siloti held by the State Archives in Leipzig, company archives of the Music Publishing House C.F.Peters (Leipzig).
