= Frank Lymer Gratton =

Australian music educator and choral conductor

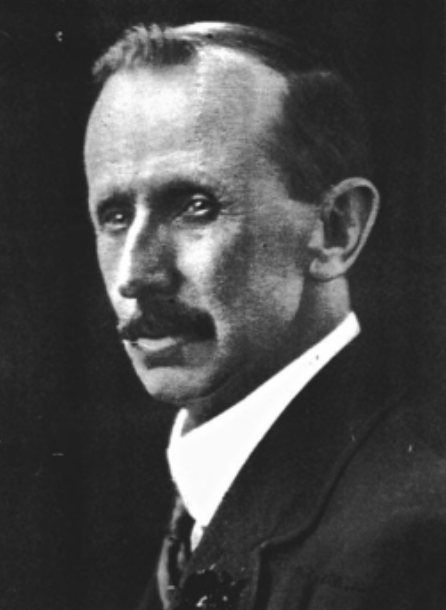
- Born: 1871
- Died: 1946 (aged 74–75)
- Occupation: Choir director, conductor, music teacher

Francis Lymer Gratton ATCL (1871 – 26 November 1946) was a teacher and choral conductor in South Australia, known for his leadership of the Thousand Voices Choir.

== Early life and education ==
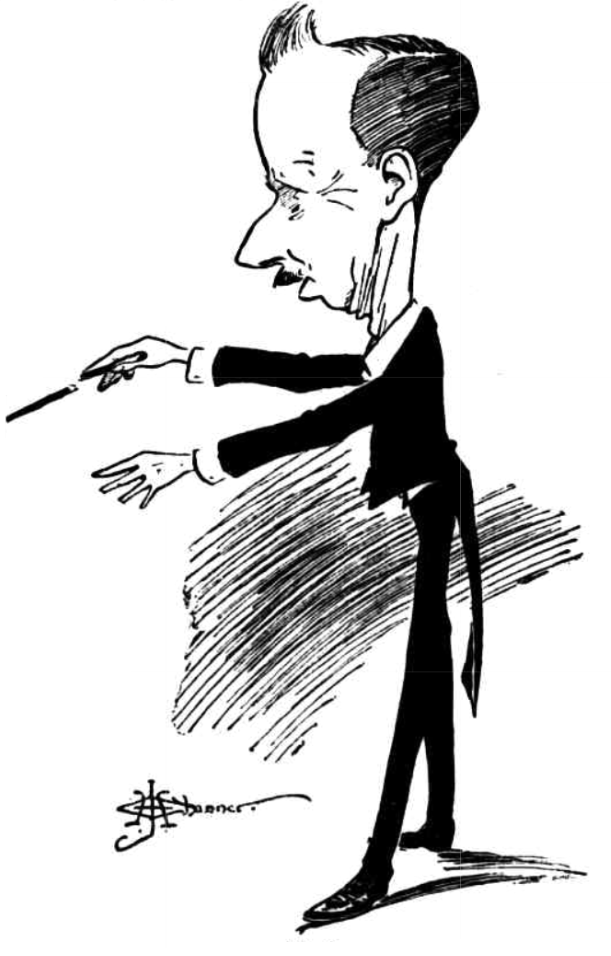
caricature by J. H. Chinner

Gratton was born in Halifax, West Yorkshire, second son of the (Methodist New Connexion) Rev. Enoch Gratton (c. April 1838 – 30 June 1931). He was educated at King Edward's School, Birmingham. Rev. Gratton was invited to South Australia to succeed Rev. M. J. Birks as pastor of the Methodist New Connexion Church, later Maughan Church, in Franklin Street and emigrated with his family aboard Orient, arriving in August 1883. He served that church for seven years, followed by Moonta, the Kensington and Eastwood circuit, Petersburg and elsewhere. He was active in the cause of Methodist Union. Shortly before he died he wrote for the Christian press a succinct history of Methodism in South Australia.

He was educated at the Sturt Street school and the High School in Gilles Street. At the age of 10, as a member of the church choir, he became a lover of music and harmony, and though largely self-taught, developed as a highly proficient singer, composer, arranger, conductor and organist.

== Career ==
=== Teaching ===
In 1888, he was appointed student teacher at the Sturt Street School. His first posting was as an assistant teacher at Moonta 1893–1896, followed by the Currie Street school 1896–1902.

He was promoted to head teacher at Kalangadoo, where he taught from 1903 to 1905. He received a contract with the Tasmanian Education Department and resigned from the SA service. He was in Launceston, Tasmania from 1906 attached to the Charles Street school.

He returned to South Australia in the 1906–1907 Christmas holidays to marry Amy Burrows of Mount Gambier. The couple lived in Launceston until 1911, when they returned to South Australia, and he rejoined the Education Department on the staff of the Teachers' College, taking music and other subjects. He also acted as relieving head teacher at the Wellington Road (Payneham) and Rose Park schools.

=== Music ===
While in Tasmania, as assistant to Director of Education W. L. Neale (previously of South Australia), he did much to influence the teaching of music and singing. He inaugurated a series of concerts by school choirs held in Launceston's Albert Hall. As an accredited examiner in the tonic sol-fa system of singing education, he influenced teacher training methods in that State.

In 1920 the SA Education Department appointed him supervisor of music, a post he held until he retired around 1936. In November 1931 he was knocked down by a bicycle at the corner of Pulteney Street and North Terrace, resulting in a broken femur.

From 1912 to 1918 he conducted the choir of Malvern Methodist Church, and was soloist on occasion.

In conjunction with Maughan Church, he assembled and led the 600-voice Methodist Centenary Choir, which gave a series of recitals, beginning with the opening of the Payneham Resthaven nursing home on 29 February 1936, when Ruth Gratton and Howard Pfitzner were soloists and the Adelaide Town Hall on 1 March 1936, when Norman Chinner presided at the organ.

The Thousand Voice Choir was founded in 1891 by Alexander Clark (died 1913) as the Public Schools Decoration Society with nine schools contributing singers. Clark was succeeded by Inspector of Schools William John McBride (died 22 May 1926), who retired in 1921. Gratton continued the tradition, and by 1926 there were 35 schools and in 1937, 45 schools participating in the annual concert at the Jubilee Exhibition Building. Between 1921 and 1938 Gratton conducted 96 Thousand Voice concerts.

He organised and conducted a choir of nearly 500 singers, drawn from a range of suburban musical societies, for the Melba Memorial Concert held at the Adelaide Town Hall on 16 May 1931, in aid of the Adelaide Children's Hospital.

Between 1945 and 1946 he led the South Australian Police Association choir in a series of charity concerts in metropolitan and country areas.

His remains were cremated at the West Terrace Cemetery.

== Compositions ==
Gratton composed a setting for the hymn "Abide with Me" in 1936, in memory of his father.

== Recognition ==
In 1938 Gratton was made an honorary Fellow of the Tonic Sol-Fa College of London.

== Family ==
Enoch Gratton married to Hannah Gratton (died 1890), had three children:

- Ernest Poole Gratton (c. 1870 – 22 July 1951) lived at Prospect
- Francis Lymer Gratton married Amy Jane Barrows of Mount Gambier on 2 January 1907 lived on Marine Parade, Seacliff. They had two children:

- Maxwell Gratton, lived in Melbourne
- Ruth Gratton married Gemmell Payne on 8 October 1938, lived in Loxton

- Rose Alice Gratton (died 1955) married Arnold Augustus Gladwyn Lewis on 7 June 1913, lived in Walkerville
