= La Bonne Chanson (publishing company) =

- Founded: 1937
- Country of origin: Canada
- Location: Saint-Hyacinthe, Quebec

La Bonne Chanson is a Canadian publishing and independent record label that is "dedicated to the dissemination of French and French-Canadian songs of quality". It was founded in Saint-Hyacinthe, Quebec, Canada in 1937 by Charles-Émile Gadbois.
