= Gradon =

Gradon is an English locational surname, of a location now lost. It can also be spelt Graddon, Gratton, Gredan, Gredden, Gredon, Greydon, Greeding, Gridon and Grodden.

== Notable people with this surname ==
- Alexander Gradon (1666–1739), Irish politician
- Margaretta Graddon (1804–?), British singer
- Sophie Gradon (1985–2018), English reality TV personality and former Miss Great Britain
- Simon Gredon, Archdeacon of Chichester
