= Julie Wood =

Franco-Belgian comics series

Julie Wood was a Franco-Belgian comics series drawn and written by French cartoonist Jean Graton between 1976 and 1980. It centered around a young female motorcyclist, Julie Wood. When the series ended the character was introduced in Graton's other, more famous, comics series Michel Vaillant.

The character was portrayed by German actress Diane Kruger in the 2003 film adaptation of Michel Vaillant.

== Overview ==
Founded in 1976 by Jean Graton, these series found an audience among bikers and other comics fans. Julie Wood was regularly published in the comics magazine Super As. The albums were published from 1976 to 1979 by Dargaud, and in 1979 and 1980 by Fleurus. The series consists of 8 albums plus 2 advertising albums. After 1980 the heroine was featured in the series Michel Vaillant in 1982, in which she becomes the bride of Steve Warson from the album Paris-Dakar.

== Albums ==
- Une fille nommée Julie Wood
- Défends-toi Julie
- 500 fous au départ
- Pas de cadeau pour Julie
- Le motard maudit
- Un ours, un singe...et un side-car
- Ouragan sur Daytona
- Bol d'or
