= Harry Puddicombe =

Canadian composer, pianist and music educator

Harry Puddicombe (c. 14 June 1870 – 7 June 1953) was a Canadian composer, pianist, and music educator. He is best remembered for his work as a teacher, notably founding the Canadian Conservatory of Music in 1902 and serving as its director for 35 years. The original score of his piano work Poème tragique is held at the Library and Archives Canada.

== Life ==
Born Henry Puddicombe in London, Ontario, Puddicombe's father made a living as a cabinet maker. He later changed his first name to Harry. In 1891 he traveled to Germany to study the piano with Martin Krause in Leipzig. He studied with Krause through 1896 with the initial intention of pursuing a career as a concert pianist. However, he had suffered from a severe case of stage fright which eventually forced him to abandon a performance career.

In 1901 Puddicombe returned to Ottawa where he began a private music studio. The following year he founded the Canadian Conservatory of Music which was located on Bay Street in Ottawa. He served as the school's director for the next 35 years. His brother-in-law, the multi-talented Donald Heins, was enlisted as a member of the faculty and became an instrumental part of the school's success. Heins notably established the school's symphony orchestra in 1903 and served as its director through 1927. In 1910 the orchestra was restructured to become Ottawa's first professional symphony orchestra. Other notable teachers that Puddicombe enlisted were Annie Jenkins and Herbert Sanders. Among his notable pupils were Yvon Barette, Joseph Beaulieu, Gladys Ewart, Johana Harris, and Hélène Landry.

The Canadian Conservatory of Music closed in 1937, when the school's building was confiscated by the municipality of Ottawa to meet the expanding public school system's needs. Puddicombe continued to operate a private studio through the latter years of his life. He died in Ottawa in 1953.
