= Jean Graton =

French comic book author (1923–2021)

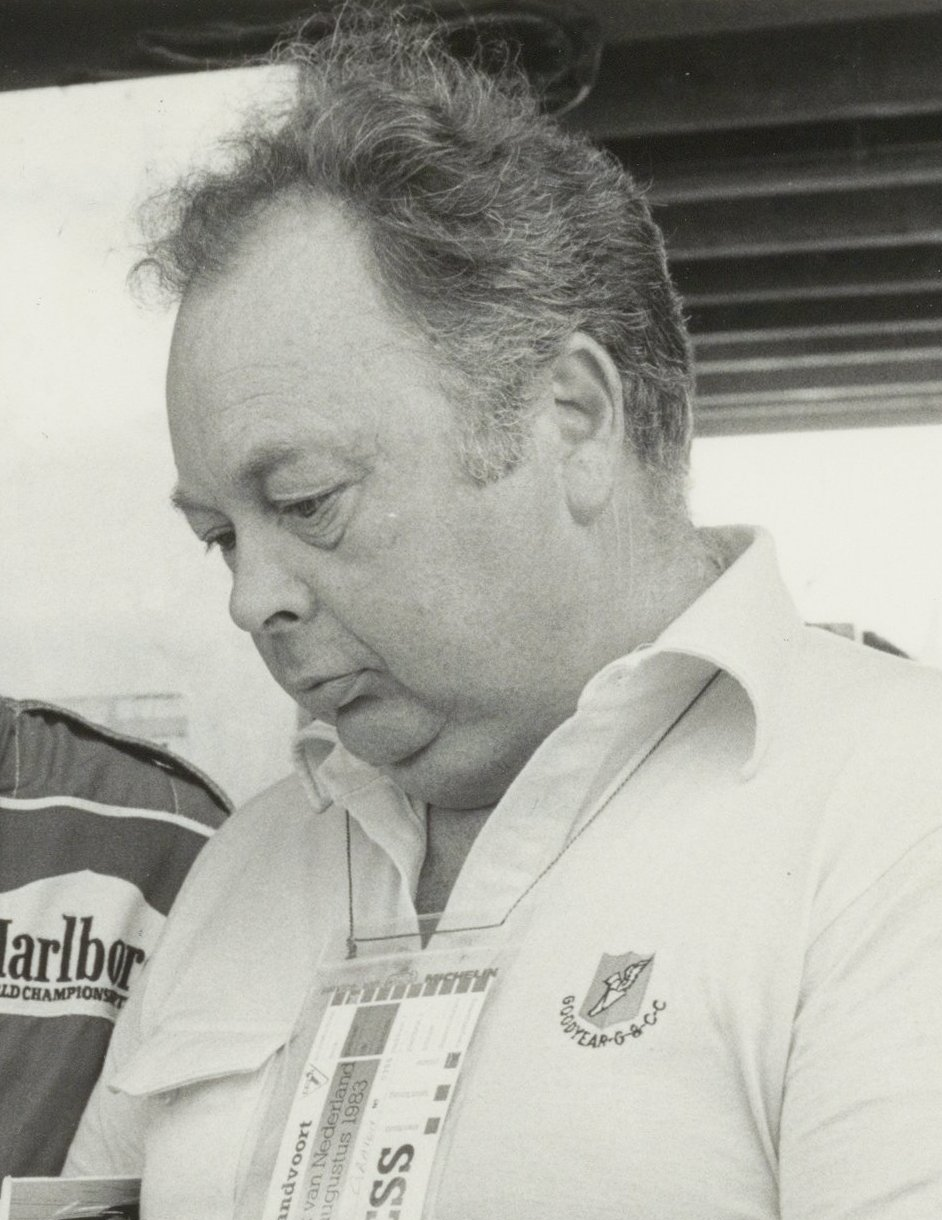
- Graton in 1983
- Born: 10 August 1923 Nantes, France
- Died: 21 January 2021 (aged 97) Brussels, Belgium
- Areas: Artist, writer
- Notable works: Michel Vaillant
- Awards: List

Jean Graton (10 August 1923 – 21 January 2021) was a French cartoonist. Graton created the character Michel Vaillant and the eponymous series in 1957.

== Biography ==
Graton was born in Nantes, France, in 1923. He moved to Brussels in 1947 and worked there in animation and advertising companies. He was hired by Spirou magazine in 1952, for which he illustrated Belles Histoires de l'Oncle Paul. Determined to create and draw his own characters, he got a job for Tintin magazine. From 1953, he published his own stories in Tintin. Some consisting of a few strips, and most related to sports and automobiles, were published in 1957 by Le Lombard in an album entitled Ca c'est du sport!.

In 1957, Graton created the character Michel Vaillant. Some short comics were published in Tintin and acquired huge popularity. As soon as 1959, a full album was published by Le Lombard. In 1966, Graton created the Les Labourdet series with his wife, Francine, and published it between 1967 and 1970 in the Chez Nous magazine. In 1972, he created Julie Wood, a character who starred first in her own series, then in the Michel Vaillant series. In 1982, Graton started, with his son Philippe Graton, his own publishing house, Graton Editeur. He launched, with Philippe Graton, the Dossiers Michel Vaillant series in 1995, each album of which being dedicated to a famous driver. In 2000, they created the Palmarès Inedit series, made up of comics that were drawn by Graton in the 1950s and 1960s, including the Labourdet series, as well as comics that had not been published before.

In 2004, Graton, at the age of 80, decided to retire and to stop drawing. His works are continued by Philippe Graton and the Studio Graton, which he created himself.

On 21 January 2021, Graton died in Brussels, Belgium, at the age of 97.

== Graphic style ==
Graton's series is popular in part because of its realism. His works, particularly the Michel Vaillant series, are noted for featuring real-life people, drivers, teams, races, and places. Graton was recognized as an automobile and motorsport drawer. Several descriptions of places, circuits, and cars he gave in his series are well-documented, specific, and realistic. Graton took many notes, illustrations, and photographs of various automobile-related places he attended as an automobile enthusiast. His son Philippe, a photography enthusiast, later assisted him in his work.

== Relation with motorsports ==
Graton's passion for motorsport went back to his childhood. Later in his life, he attended numerous Formula One and other motorsport races, and was acknowledged by famous drivers. His series inspired some drivers to choose such a career.

== Awards ==
- In 1986, at the Morzine Avoriaz BD Festival, he received the "Le sport: Une œuvre, un Auteur" (Sport: A work, an author) award.
- In 1989, at the Belgian Bande Dessinée Festival at Han sur Lesse, he was rewarded by the president of the festival and the Belgian minister, Amand Dalem, a "prix spécial d'exception pour l'ensemble de son œuvre" (special prize for his whole work).
- In 2004, at the 19th Automobile Festival, he was given the "Grand Prix de l'Art" award.
- In 2005, he was named "Chevalier de l'Ordre de Léopold" by Belgium.

== Bibliography ==
- Les Histoires vraies de l'Oncle Paul (24 stories, published in 12 albums, 1953–1954)
- Ça, c'est du sport! (1 album, 1957)
- Michel Vaillant (96 albums, 1959–2007)
- Les Labourdet (9 albums, 1967–2008)
- Un exploit de Michel Vaillant (1 album, 1972)
- Julie Wood (12 albums, 1976–1980)
- Dossiers Michel Vaillant (9 albums, 1995–2008)
- Palmarès inédit (6 albums, 2000–2006)
