= Studio Graton =

The logo of the studio was designed after the logo of Vaillante, from the series Michel Vaillant.

The Studio Graton, or Studio Jean Graton is a drawing studio that helped French cartoonist Jean Graton draw various comics series, among them the famous series Michel Vaillant.

== History ==
In 1962, Jean Graton hires an assistant, the young Christian Denayer, to help him with the drawing of the sets and cars and the colorization of the Michel Vaillant plates. After eight years of collaboration, Denayer left to work for Tibet and what was already the embryo of the Graton Studio was expanded to include Daniel Bouchez and Christian Lippens.

The studio was created by Jean Graton in the mid-1980s, contributing to several albums. It was made up of various drawers. In the 1990, a new generation of artists came, and the studio was in charge of all the drawings when Jean Graton withdrawn in 2003. It is now led by Philippe Graton, the son of Jean Graton, who has designed the scenarios of the series since the 1994.

== Publications ==
- Michel Vaillant
- Les dossiers Michel vaillant

== List of current artists ==
- Christian Papazoglakis
- Nedzad Kamenica
- Robert Paquet
