= Victoria Skating Rink =

Former indoor ice skating rink in Montreal

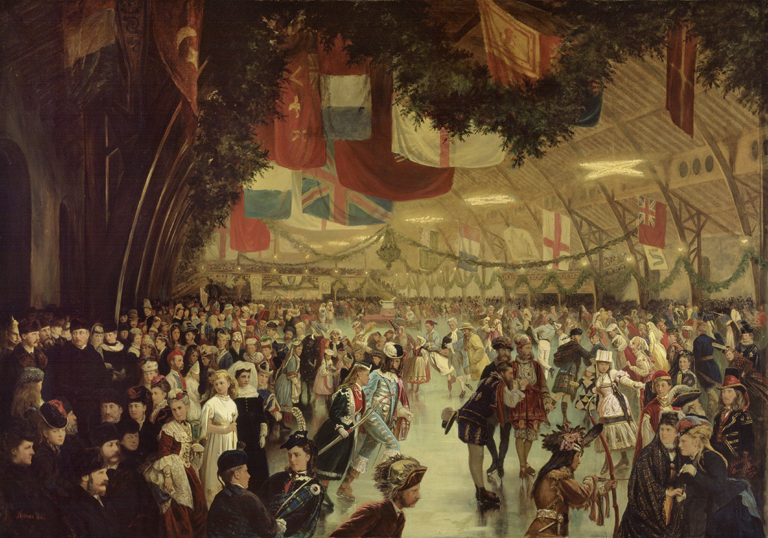
- 1870 skating carnival in Victoria Rink in honour of Prince Arthur, Duke of Connaught and Strathearn. Hundreds of skaters, some in costume, some in military dress skate inside the arena, which is decorated with evergreen boughs and flags.
- Interactive map of Victoria Skating Rink
- Location: Montreal, Québec, Canada
- Coordinates: 45.4980°N 73.5724°W
- Surface: natural ice

Construction
- Opened: December 24, 1862
- Closed: 1925

The Victoria Skating Rink was an indoor ice skating rink located in Montreal, Quebec, Canada. Opened in 1862, it was described at the start of the twentieth century to be "one of the finest covered rinks in the world". The building was used during winter seasons for pleasure skating, ice hockey and skating sports on a natural ice rink. In summer months, the building was used for various events, including musical performances and horticultural shows. It was the first building in Canada to be electrified.

The rink hosted the first-ever recorded organized indoor ice hockey match on March 3, 1875. The ice surface dimensions were confined to the distance between Drummond and Stanley Streets, which came to define the standard for today's North American ice hockey rinks. It was also the site of the first Stanley Cup playoff in 1894, where the second Stanley Cup was presented. It was also the location of the founding of the first championship ice hockey league, the Amateur Hockey Association of Canada in 1886. Frederick Stanley, the donor of the Stanley Cup, witnessed his first ice hockey game there in 1889. In 1896, telegraph wires were connected at the Rink to do simultaneous score-by-score description of a Stanley Cup challenge series between Montreal and Winnipeg, Manitoba teams, a first of its kind.

The rink was also notable for its role in the development of figure skating in Canada. It held some of the first competitions in the sport in Canada. During its existence, it was the home of two important clubs, the Victoria Skating Club and the Earl Grey Skating Club. It was the home rink of Louis Rubenstein, considered one of the first world champions of the sport, and also an important organizer.

The rink was located in central Montreal between Drummond Street and Stanley Street, immediately north of Dorchester Boulevard (presently René Lévesque Boulevard). It was located one block to the west of Dominion Square (today's Dorchester Square), where the Montreal Winter Carnivals of the 19th century were held. Surpassed by other facilities, including the Montreal Forum, the rink was sold in 1925 and today the site is occupied by a parking garage and pay toilets.

== Building ==
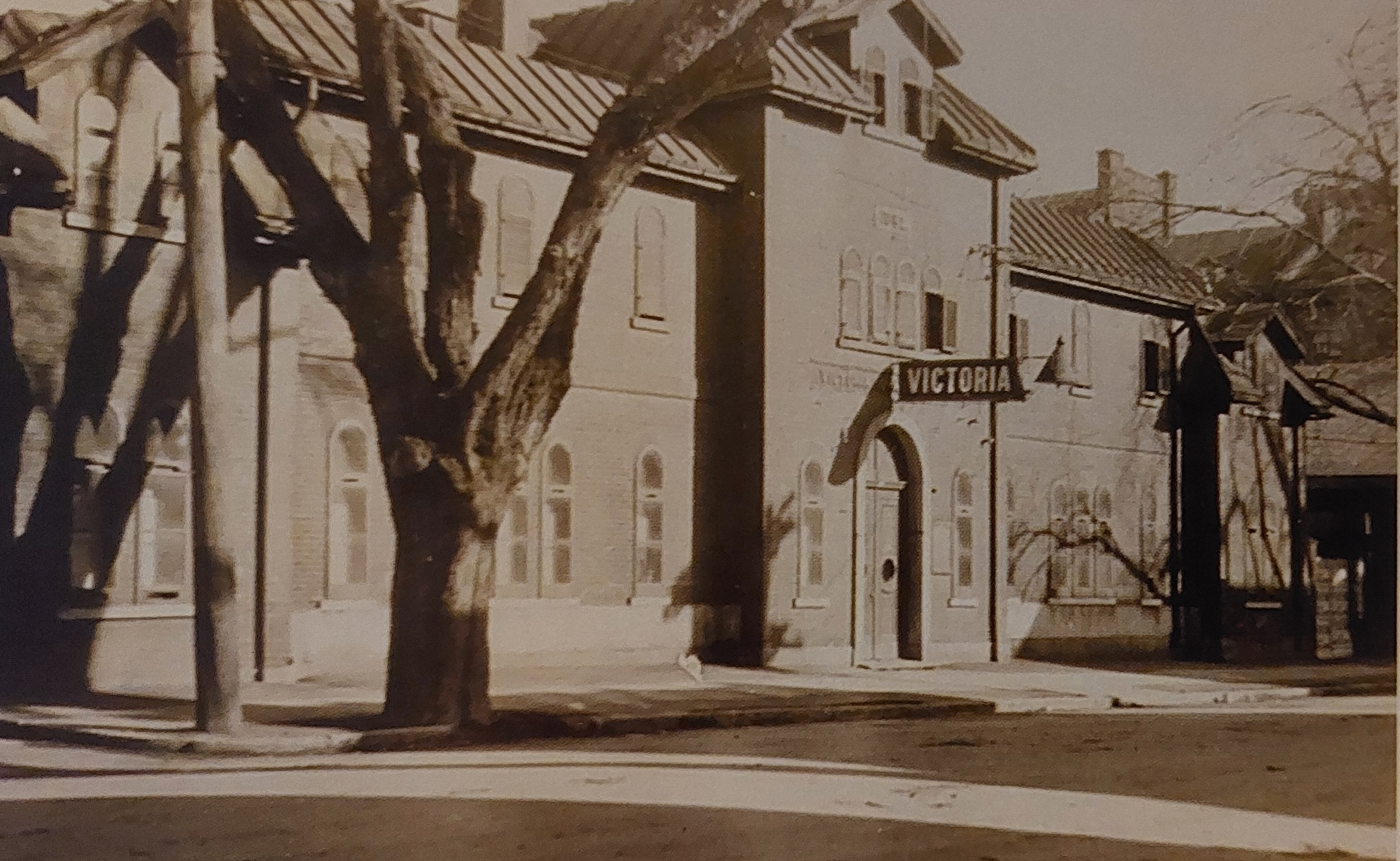
Exterior view of Victoria Skating Rink, 1862

Designed by Lawford & Nelson, Architects, the building was a long (252 by 113 feet [77 m × 34 m]), wide, two-storey brick edifice with a 52-foot-high (16 m) pitched roof supported from within by curving wooden trusses, which arched over the entire width of the structure. Tall, round-arched windows punctuated its length and illuminated its interior, while evening skating was made possible by 500 gas-jet lighting fixtures set in coloured glass globes. At a later date, the lighting was converted to electric, making the building the first in Canada to be electrified.

The ice surface measured 204 feet (62 m) by 80 feet (24 m), dimensions very similar to today's National Hockey League (NHL) ice rinks. It was surrounded by a 10-foot-wide (3.0 m) platform, or promenade, which was elevated approximately 1 foot (30 cm) above the ice surface and upon which spectators could stand or skaters could rest. Later, a gallery was added with a royal box for visiting dignitaries. The ice itself was a 'natural' ice surface, frozen by the coldness of the season, not by the later invention of mechanically-frozen ice.

At the time of its construction, the rink's location at 49 Drummond Street (now renumbered to 1187), placed it in the centre of the English community in Montreal, in the vicinity of McGill University. The area is referred to today as the "Golden Square Mile", the area of central Montreal populated then by rich businessmen of British descent who had made the city the budding centre of commerce in Canada. One block east was Dominion Square, where annual outdoor winter sporting events were held and later the Montreal Winter Carnival was held. Across the street to the east, the Windsor Hotel, a long-time centre of social life and meeting place of several sports organizations, was built in 1875, and was the site of the founding of both the Montreal Canadiens (1909) and the National Hockey League itself in 1917. Nearby is old Windsor Station, which was the eastern terminus of the Canadian Pacific Railway, built in 1889.

== History ==
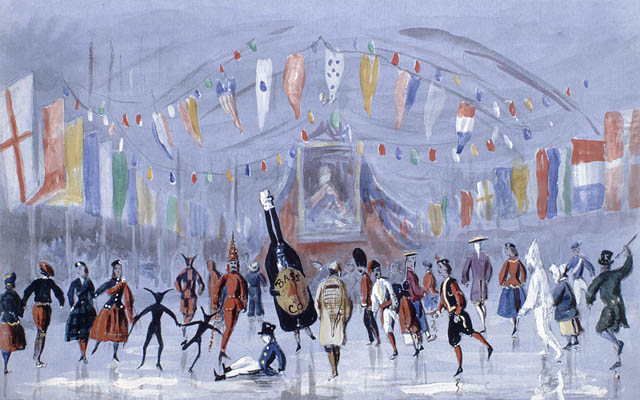
Fancy Ball at Victoria Rink, 1865

The Victoria Skating Club was incorporated on June 9, 1862, with a sizable capitalization of CA$12,000 (equivalent to $254,219 in 2025), for the purpose of buying the land and building the rink. The directors included members of prominent families of the Golden Square Mile: John Greenshields, whose family owned the largest drygoods wholesale firm in Canada and James Torrance, whose family owned a prosperous provisions wholesale firm. The rink, one of the first and largest indoor rinks in North America, was completed and opened on December 24, 1862. However, it was not the first indoor rink in Montreal. The first had opened in 1859, at the north end of St. Urbain Street, for the Montreal Skating Club. It was the first of numerous ice rinks in Canada to be named after Queen Victoria. By about 1880, membership in the Victoria Skating Club had reached 2,000, mostly drawn from Montreal's upper classes, who enjoyed considerable leisure time and could afford to participate in such events as the fancy-dress balls, which were a regular feature at the rink.

A quote from the 1870s that appeared in the book Montreal Yesterdays captures the essence:

When many hundred persons are upon the ice, and with every variety of costume, pass through all the graceful figures that skaters delight in, the scene presented to the spectator is dazzling in the extreme.

The rink became a major attraction for visitors to Montreal. In 1886, visiting Captain Willard Glazier described the scene:

One of the principal points of attraction in both winter and summer is the Victoria Skating Rink, in Dominion Square. This extensive building is used during the milder months of the year for horticultural shows, concerts and miscellaneous gatherings. In the winter the doors of this place are thronged with a crowd of sleighs and sleigh drivers, while inside, skaters and spectators form a living, moving panorama, pleasant to look upon. The place is lighted by gas, and men and women, old and young, with a plentiful sprinkling of children, on skates, are practicing all sorts of gyrations. The ladies are prettily and appropriately dressed in skating costumes, and some of them are proficient in the art of skating. The spectators sit or stand on a raised lege around the ice parallelogram, while the skaters dart off, singly or in pairs, executing quadrilles, waltzes, curves, straight lines, letters, labyrinths, and every conceivable figure. Now and then some one comes to grief in the surging, moving throng; but is quickly on his or her feet again, the ice and water shaken off, and the zigzag resumed. Children skate; boys and girls; ladies and gentlemen, and even dignified military officers. Some skate well, some medium, some shockingly ill; but all skate, or essay to do so. It is the grand Montrealese pastime, and though the ice is sloppy, and the air chill and heavy with moisture, everybody has a good time.

The Rink hosted pleasure skating and masquerade balls during the 1880s Montreal Winter Carnivals, which took place a city block to the east in Dominion Square.

=== Ice hockey ===
==== First game ====
On March 3, 1875, the Rink hosted what has been recognized as the first indoor organized ice hockey game, between members of the Club, organized by James Creighton, a member of the Victoria Skating Club and a figure skating judge. The match lays claim to this distinction because of several factors which establish its link to modern ice hockey: it featured two teams (nine players per side), goaltenders, a referee, a puck, a pre-determined set of rules, including a pre-determined length of time (60 minutes) with a recorded score. Games prior to this had mostly been outdoors, with sticks and balls, with informal rules and informal team sizes. In order to limit injuries to spectators and damage to glass windows, the game was played with a wooden puck instead of a lacrosse ball, possibly the first time such an object was used. The two teams, members of the Club, included a number of McGill University students. Sticks and skates for this game were imported from Nova Scotia, including Mic-mac sticks and Starr skates. This first game was pre-announced to the general public in the pages of the Montreal Gazette newspaper:

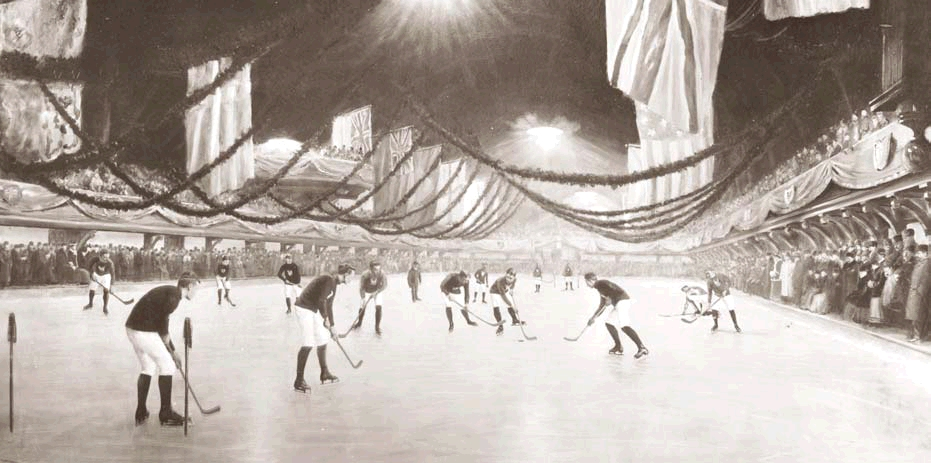
1893 hockey game

Announcement

Victoria Rink – A game of Hockey will be played at the Victoria Skating Rink this evening, between two nines chose from among the members. Good fun may be expected, as some of the players are reputed to be exceedingly expert at the game. Some fears have been expressed on the part of intending spectators that accidents were likely to occur through the ball flying about in too lively a manner, to the imminent danger of lookers on, but we understand that the game will be played with a flat circular piece of wood, thus preventing all danger of its leaving the surface of the ice. Subscribers will be admitted on presentation of their tickets.

By moving ice hockey game indoors, the smaller dimensions of the rink initiated a major change from the outdoor version of the game, limiting organized contests to a nine-man limit per team. Until that time, outdoor games had no prescribed number of players, the number being more or less the number that could fit on a frozen pond or river and often ranged in the dozens. The nine-man per side rule would last until the 1880s, when it was reduced during the Montreal Winter Carnival Hockey Tournament to seven per side.

==== Role in organized ice hockey ====
From 1875 until 1881, hockey matches would be held between hockey-playing members of the Skating Club and outside teams, such as McGill University and the Montreal Hockey Club. In 1881, the Victoria Hockey Club was organized and made the Rink its home. Play at first was by exhibition only as there were no leagues. The Rink was used for exhibition games or as an indoor facility if the outdoor rink was not available during the annual Winter Carnivals. It was for the 1883 Carnival that hockey team sizes were reduced further, to seven per side, which was the common size for the next thirty years. Eventually the tournament play led to plans for a league. The Rink hosted the founding meeting of the Amateur Hockey Association of Canada (AHAC) league in December 1886. The AHAC was the second organized ice hockey league in Canada, and the first championship league.

Lord Stanley, later to donate the Stanley Cup trophy, witnessed his first ice hockey game at the Victoria Rink on February 4, 1889, seeing the Victorias defeat the Montreal Hockey Club 2–1. According to The Globe, "the vice-regal party was immensely delighted with it." The Rink would later host the first Stanley Cup playoffs in 1894. By that time, the building had gained an elevated balcony for additional spectators and a projecting loge, precursor of today's luxury boxes. In 1896, the rink was connected by telegraph to distribute the Montreal-Winnipeg Stanley Cup series score immediately. This is considered the first ice hockey broadcast by wire. As a side note, the Montreal Wanderers practiced at the rink in 1903 and early 1904 before moving to the Montagnard Stadium (The Daily Witness, December 9, 1903). Their home rink for games was the Montreal Arena.

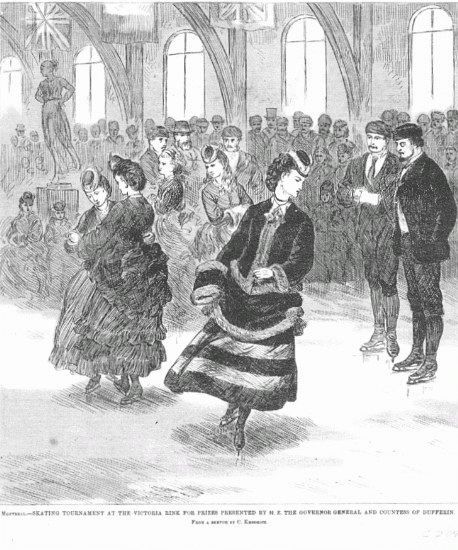
Skating tournament in 1873

=== Ice skating ===
The Rink was built for the Victoria Skating Club and skating was its primary use at first. The Rink was prominent in the development of the sports of figure skating and speed skating. Figure skating, known as "fancy skating" began in the 1860s and the Rink held championships starting in the 1870s. A combination of racing and fancy skating championships was held in February 1888 was announced internationally in the February 1, 1888 New York Times. The races were "220 yards, quarter-mile, half-mile, mile, five miles, 220 yards over six hurdles 27 inches high, and junior championship races." This was followed a week later by the fancy skating championship of figures.

Victoria Rink was the home rink of Louis Rubenstein, Canadian and world figure skating champion. Rubenstein first won the Montreal Championship in 1878, and won his first Canadian championship at the Victoria Rink in 1883. At the time, the Victoria Skating Club was considered "the most important one in the Dominion, if not on the continent." In 1887, the Club arranged for the formation of the Amateur Skating Association of Canada, the first national governing body of skating in Canada.

In 1906, the Victoria Skating Club sold the rink, dissolving the Club. Ice skating continued under the new ownership, and on December 19, 1908, the Earl Grey Skating Club was founded at the Victoria Rink. In a ceremony at the rink, the club's patron, Governor-General Albert Grey formally initiated the club. Club honorary president Sir H. Montagu Allan and Lady Evelyn Grey were the first to appear on the ice. Mrs. Helen Joseph became the president of the Club. The Earl Grey Club would move to the Montreal Arena by 1911.

=== Musical performances ===
The Rink hosted many musical performances. In 1878, a benefit concert was held to aid yellow fever victims in the southern states of the United States, featuring soprano Leonora Braham. In 1890, an audience of 6,000 attended a benefit for Montreal's Notre-Dame Hospital featuring a performance by soprano Emma Albani, as well as pianist and composer Salomon Mazurette, violinist Alfred De Sève, and the Montreal City Band under the direction of Ernest Lavigne. The rink is also known to have held performances of the Montreal Philharmonic Society, which existed from 1875 to 1899.

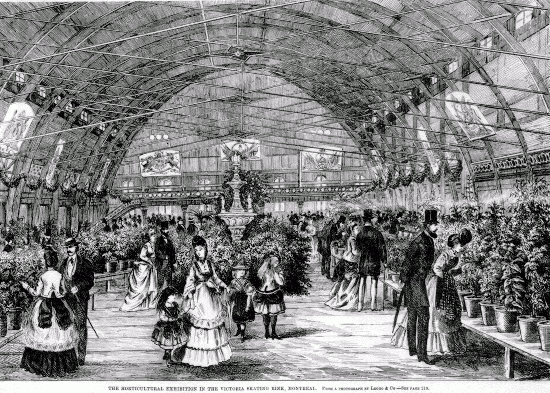
Hosting a Horticultural Exhibition, 1871

=== Other events ===
The Rink was large enough to be used for conferences and exhibitions during the months that no ice was installed. From the 1860s onwards, the Rink hosted the annual Montreal Horticultural Society Exhibition each September. A description of the 1864 exhibition notes that "in addition to prizes for Agriculture, Horticulture, Poultry, Birds, Paint, etc., $200 is offered as prizes for the best band and best solo performer on bugle, fife and drum." The Presbyterian Church in Canada held their inaugural meeting there on June 15, 1875, and other local assemblies, including an assembly of Sunday School students on October 1, 1887, in honour of Queen Victoria's Jubilee, attended by approximately 10,000 children. The programme included "singing by the children and by the Fisk Jubilee singers, and exhibition by a number of deaf mutes and also by several Indians from Algoma."

In September 1891, the National Electric Association of the United States held its convention in Montreal, including demonstrations of electrical technology by Thomas Edison and a public lecture by Nikola Tesla. In August 1897, the British Medical Association held a medical conference with an exhibition of pharmaceutical preparations, surgical and medical appliances, and "everything that interests the physician" at the Rink.

=== Decline ===
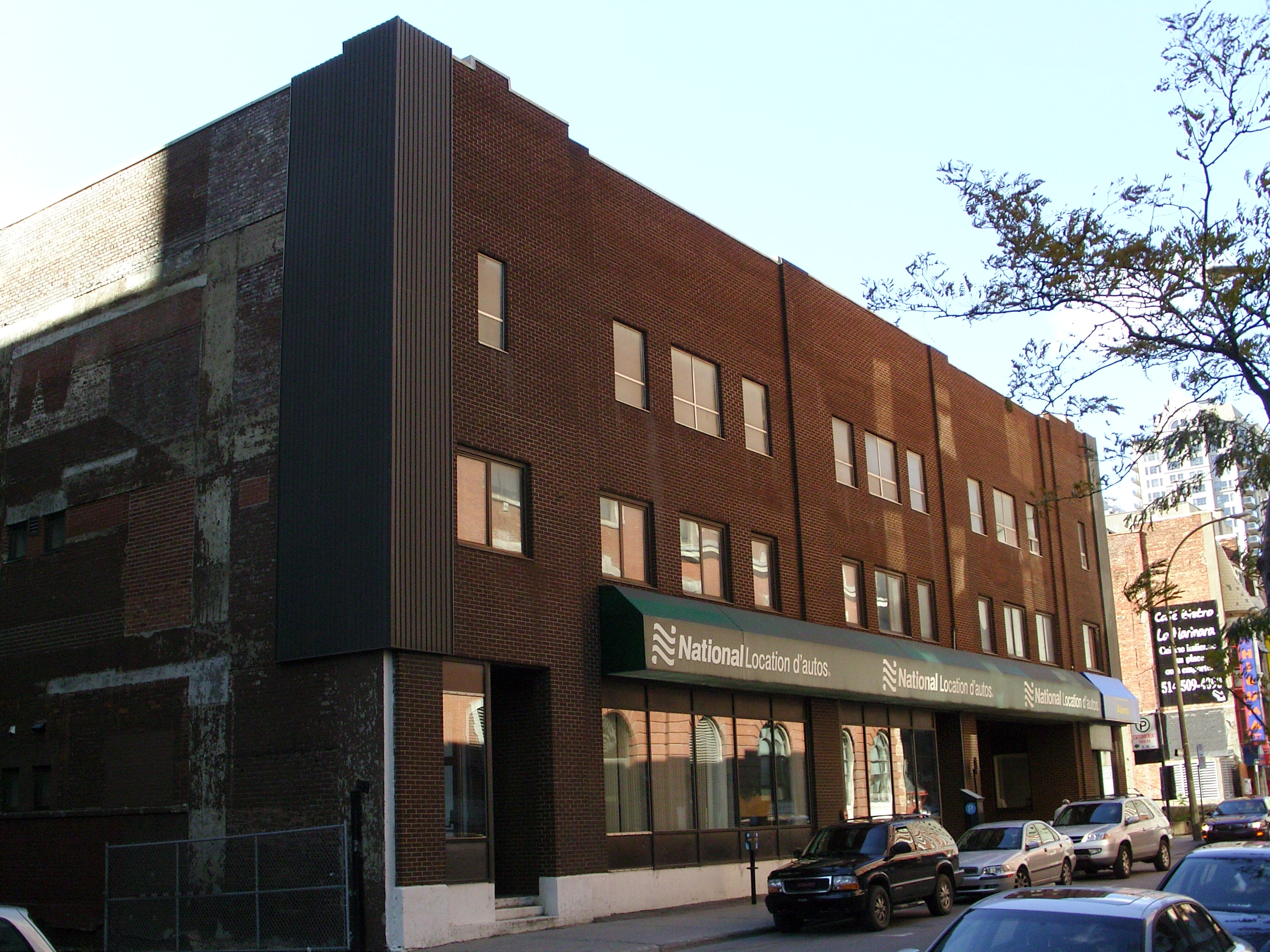
View from Stanley

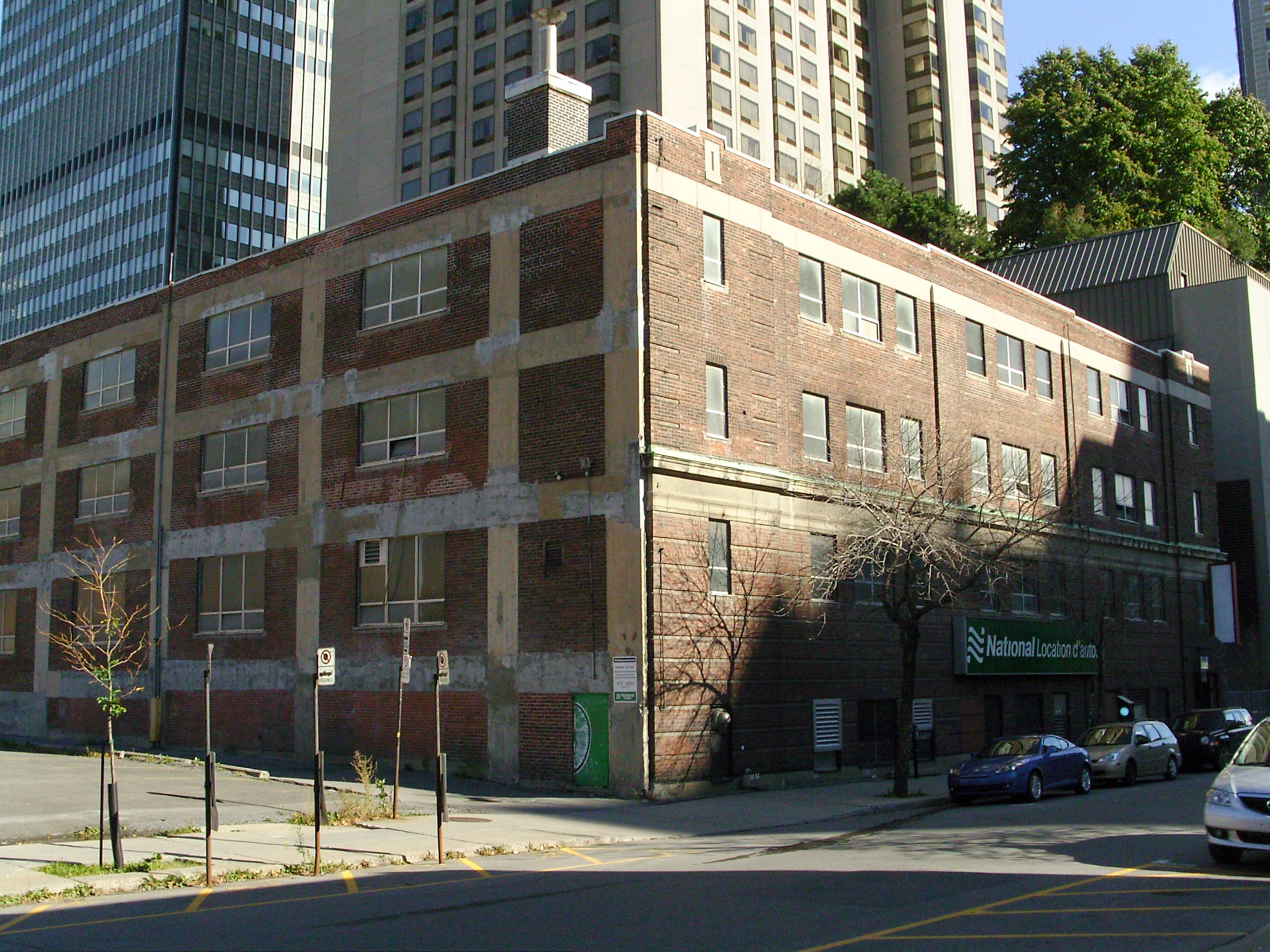
View from Drummond

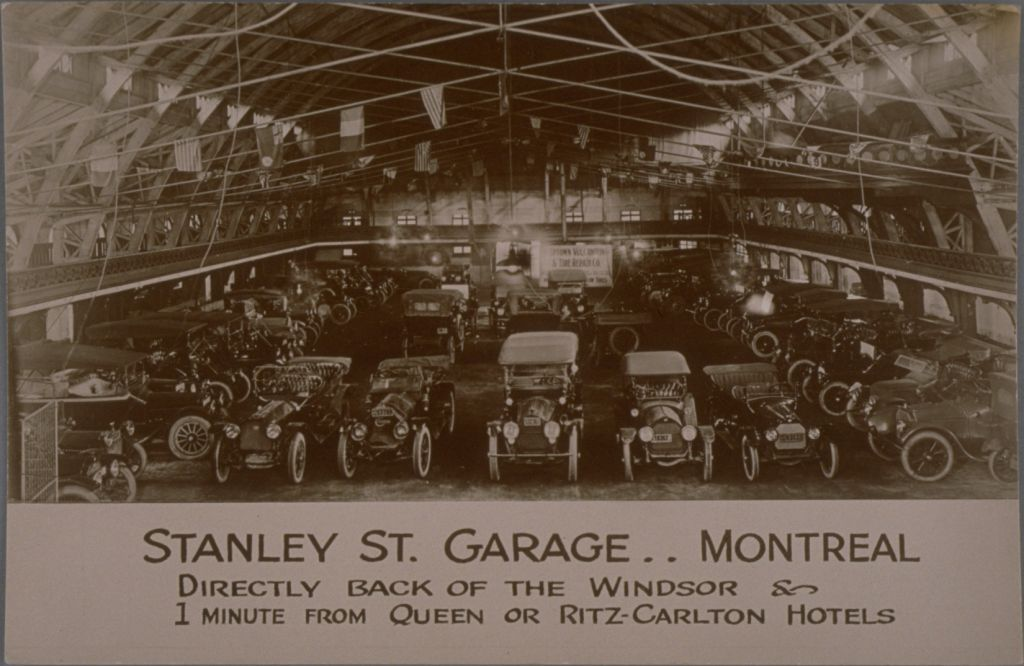
After the arrival of automobiles, the building doubled as the Stanley St. Garage during the warmer months when there was no natural ice. This is the only known photograph of its interior. The rink was demolished in 1925 to make way for the current Autoparc Stanley parking structure.

By 1906, the building needed repairs and rather than spend money on rebuilding the Rink, the Victoria Skating Club sold the site to J. William Shaw, a piano merchant, who planned to build a concert hall on the site. Shaw planned to rebuild the structure into an auditorium of 2,000 to 2,500 capacity, suitable for orchestra or opera concerts. Shaw deferred his plans due to the high cost of construction and a low expectation of profits. He continued the use of the building for skating and hockey matches, introducing a summer use for car parking.

Smaller hockey leagues continued to use the Rink, such as the Commercial and Steamship League, the Inter-School Hockey League and the Manufacturers' League. McGill University also occasionally used the rink. The final game of any note reported by the Montreal Gazette was a semi-final of the Canadian National Railway Hockey League (CNR) between Car Department and General Office on March 3, 1925, exactly fifty years after the first game. The playoff final game of the CNR league was not held at the Victoria; it was held at the Forum which had opened that season. The CNR game drew 1,200 spectators.

During the summer months, dog shows, vaudeville performances, the horticultural show and various trade exhibitions continued at the Rink. By the 1920s, the building had deteriorated and the gallery became unsafe to use. Shaw sold the site in 1925 for CA$250,000 (equivalent to $4,510,989 in 2025) to the Stanley Realty Corporation to build a parking garage. The Victoria closed and a parking garage was built in its place.

=== Current condition ===
As shown in the photos, the parking garage is still in use by a local branch of National Car Rental; Melk, a coffeehouse is situated in the parking garage, on the site of the former rink. While looking across the street at the Windsor Hotel Annex, what is left of the Windsor Hotel (the older part of the hotel was destroyed by fire and finally demolished in 1959) where both the Montreal Canadiens and National Hockey Association were founded in 1909 and the National Hockey League was founded in 1917. NHL hockey is played nearby at Centre Bell, the home arena of the Canadiens, located two blocks south. Ice skating for pleasure remains a popular pastime and an indoor ice skating rink exists nearby in the concourse of the 'Le 1000 de la Gauchetière' office building, open year-round.

== IIHF recognition ==
In 2002, the International Ice Hockey Federation (IIHF) announced that it would acknowledge the site with "a commemorative plaque or other historical site marker to remind the passers-by of the existence of the Victoria Skating Rink, the birthplace of organized hockey." The commemoration has been marked in two ways.

On May 22, 2008, a commemorative plaque was dedicated at Centre Bell, along with a plaque honouring James Creighton. Further, the IIHF created the Victoria Cup, a trophy named for the arena, for which, along with 1 million Swiss francs, one National Hockey League team, and the champion of the European Champions Hockey League playoffs annually. The first Cup match was held in Berne, Switzerland, on October 1, 2008, between the New York Rangers and the Metallurg Magnitogorsk.

== See also ==
- Amateur Hockey Association of Canada
- Matthews Arena, the world's oldest existing indoor ice hockey facility
- List of indoor arenas in Canada
