= Park Extension =

- Neighbourhood
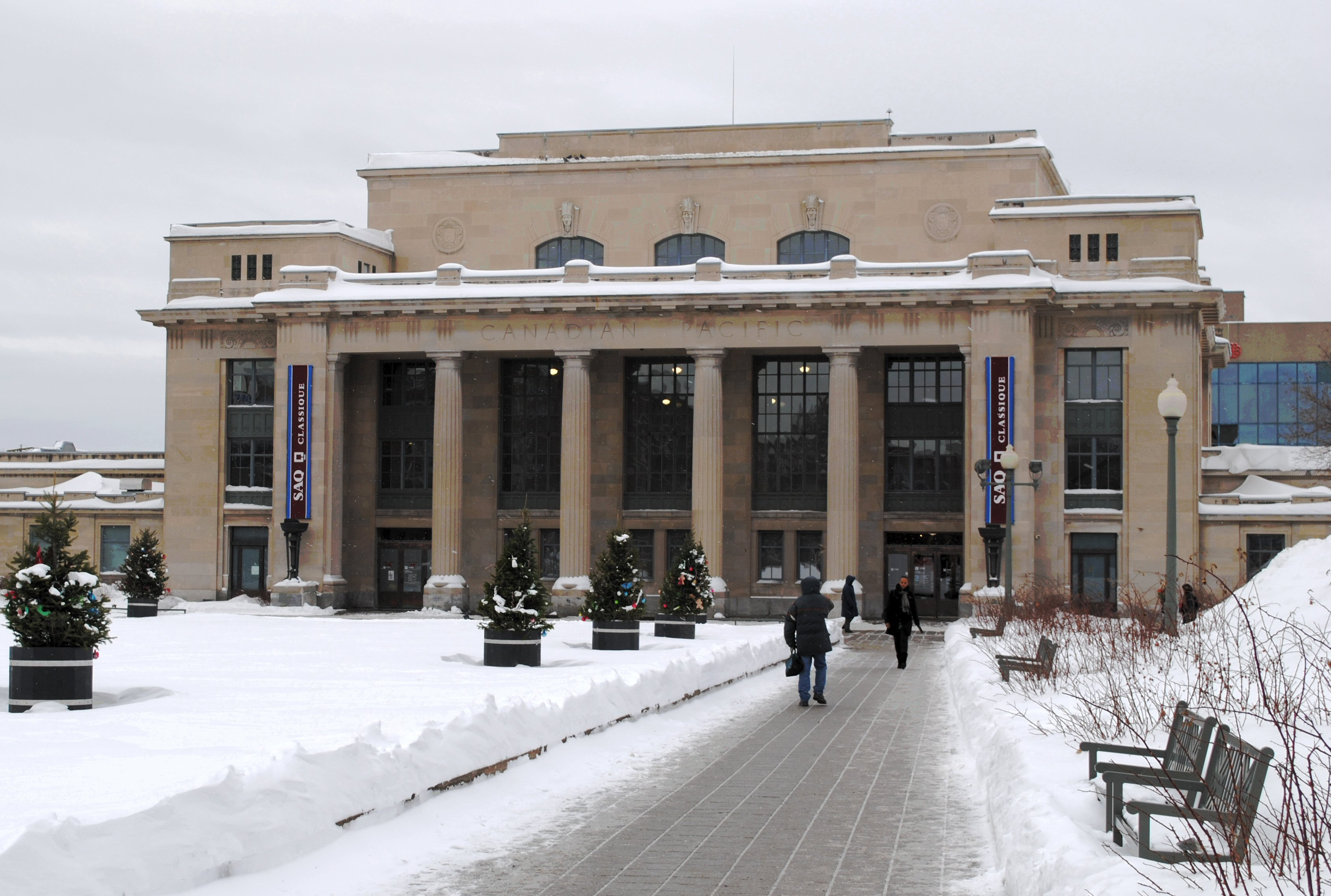
- Park Avenue station (Jean-Talon)
- Nickname: Park Ex
- Location within Montreal
- Coordinates: 45°31′38″N 73°37′26″W
- Country: Canada
- Province: Québec
- City: Montréal
- Borough: Villeray–Saint-Michel–Parc-Extension
- Established: 1910

Government
  - City Councillor: Elvira Carhuallanqui (Projet Montréal)

Area
  - Total: 1.6 km^{2} (0.62 sq mi)

Population (Canada 2006 Census)
  - Total: 33,800
  - Density: 21,000/km^{2} (55,000/sq mi)
- Postal Code: H3N
- Area codes: 514, 438

Park Extension (French: Parc-Extension, pronounced [paʁk ɛkstɑ̃sjɔ̃]) is a neighbourhood in the city of Montréal, Québec. It is located in the borough of Villeray–Saint-Michel–Parc-Extension and has a population of 33,800 and an area of 1.6 km^{2} (400 acres). The name derives from the fact that it is situated at the north end of Park Avenue and is literally an "extension" of the artery. The area is known by locals as "Park Ex."

== History ==
The area has always been a working-class neighbourhood, and understanding Park Extension's place in Montreal is to know how Montreal developed. Montreal started from a small fortified city by the Saint Lawrence River; and expanded north towards the Laurentian Mountains. Being at the head of Park Avenue, Park Extension formed the northern end of Montreal's immigrant corridor.

Park Extension was a mid-20th century suburb. It was a rural area prior to the 1950s. Starting in the early 1950s there was rapid housing development in the northern reaches of Park Extension. A significant Jewish population migrated there, mostly from Le Plateau-Mont-Royal, and established a thriving community. Several hundred families built and maintained a synagogue, Congregation Beth Aaron. By the mid-1970s, the Jewish community was diminishing. Congregation Beth Aaron merged with the Beth Israel Congregation in 1986, and the building was sold. Despite this, the Jewish community still owns property and businesses on Beaumont; the southernmost part of Park Extension.

In the 1950s and 1960s Park Extension attracted a sizable Italian population, most of whom came directly from Italy. But over time the Italian population drifted to eastern suburbs like Saint-Leonard, Quebec.

Many Greek immigrants settled in the neighbourhood from the mid-1960s through the 1980s, both from Le Plateau-Mont-Royal and directly from Greece. In the 1970s nearly 70% of residents were of Greek ancestry, and almost all the businesses along Jean Talon Street between L'Acadie Boulevard and Park Avenue were owned by Greek Canadians. In 1977 there were over 100 Greek businesses, whereas today there are only a dozen left. Four Greek churches remain, catering to the predominantly older Greek residents who still live in the area. Other younger Greeks have since moved to suburbs such as the Chomedey neighbourhood of Laval and the West Island.

Since the 1990s, most of the immigrant population coming to Parc-Ex are of South Asian origin from India, Bangladesh, Pakistan and Sri Lanka, as well as Latin American and Haitian immigrants, and a dwindling population of Greeks and Italians. Park Extension is one of Canada's most ethnically diverse neighbourhoods.

In the 2000s, more people starting moving to Park Extension from areas like the Plateau and Mile End as the housing is similar but much cheaper to rent and to buy. Several new condo buildings started being built. The area is also attractive many artists and musicians who wish to make Park Extension their permanent home. Being somewhat central on the Island of Montreal, relatively close to shopping areas (like Rockland Center, Marché Central, and Jean-Talon Market), and because of the revitalization of Jarry Park, Park Extension has become increasingly attractive to younger generations in general. There are Metro stations and several bus stops in the area too. All of this in turn, along with the new Université de Montréal campus between Beaumont and Van Horne Avenues, has caused gentrification and "renoviction" issues to affect the area gradually after about 2008 with various protests occurring in and after 2018. Many tenants who have lived there for years have been forced out of area with more being forced to leave every year.

During the "red scare" of the 1950s, according to an article in "On and Off the Record" in the Montreal Gazette dated April 24, 1956, page 4: "The Park Extension district is currently a hot-bed of Communist activity; much or all of which is known to anti-communist authorities and groups, who are keeping it under surveillance." This reflected both the suspicion of new immigrants in general, and the fact that many of these immigrants left their homelands because of political persecution.

== Geography ==
The area is bounded by the Metropolitan Expressway Autoroute 40, to the north; l'Acadie Blvd, to the west; Casgrain Avenue, to the east; and Beaumont Avenue, and Rue Jean-Talon, to the south, respectively. The surrounding neighbourhoods are Villeray and Little Italy to the east, Mile End and Outremont to the south, the Town of Mont-Royal to the west and Ahuntsic-Cartierville to the north.

Virtually the entire neighbourhood is residential, with a small amount of commercial and light manufacturing concentrated in the south. Over 35,000 people live in only 1.6 square kilometres (400 acres), more than the average population density in Montreal, but the same density as the Plateau, Villeray, St-Michel and Mile End. Parc Jarry is a large City of Montreal park, that includes IGA Stadium (tennis), that is located within Parc Extension.

Regarding Park Avenue itself, it should be mentioned that a further three block section of Park Avenue (Ave. du Parc) exists north of Metropolitan Blvd (i.e. beyond Park Extension). This street handles one-way, northbound-only traffic from Cremazie Blvd. and ends at Chabanel, in the city's garment district. In addition, a short section of Park Avenue runs north from the western end of Liege St. just east of the CPR railway tracks. This stretch of road is essentially a driveway serving loading docks of various fruit and vegetable warehouses.

Note: All compass directions above are given in nominal terms. For much of the City of Montreal, nominal "north" is actually to the west-northwest.

== Government ==
=== Municipal ===
Mary Deros is the city councillor representing Park Extension. She was elected under Vision Montreal in 1998 and has been re-elected in every municipal election since that time including the most recent election in 2017, in which she ran for Équipe Denis Coderre. After the defeat of Coderre in the city mayoralty race, her party was renamed Ensemble Montréal.

Former city councillors

- Konstantinos Georgoulis
- Stavros Zagakos
- Sofoklis Rasoulis
- Demetrios Manolakos

The district is part of the borough of Villeray–Saint-Michel–Parc-Extension.

=== Federal and provincial ===
The district is part of the Papineau federal riding and the Laurier-Dorion provincial electoral district.

== Sports ==
Many sports are popular in the Park Extension area, dating back to the Montreal Expos Baseball team at nearby Jarry Park Stadium. The primary sports of choice for the locals are ball hockey, soccer and cricket.

The province wide Quebec Ball Hockey Association has three Parc-Extension area teams: the Hellenic Republic of Parc-Ex, Park X Streets, and A.A. Hellas. The games take place at Howie Morenz Arena during the summer months. The city's only practice area for cricket with cricket cages (similar to batting cages) are in Howard Park which is next to the arena.

In the Montreal-wide soccer league, Park Extension is represented by the Panellinios soccer club.

== Culture ==
The documentary, Cricket & Parc Ex: A Love Story (2016), by director Garry Beitel and producer Barry Lazar (reFrame Films), profiled the more recently arrived immigrant South Asian communities which have moved into Park Extension and how their love for the game of cricket brings them together. It is also a film about how recreational sport can transform a neighborhood.

=== Music ===
The instrumental jazz group Parc-X Trio is named for the borough of Park Extension.

Efrim Menuck's recent album High Gospel opened with the track Our Lady of Parc Extension.

Harris Newman (guitar) and Bruce Cawdron (percussion) recorded a song called "The Pulse of Parc Ex" on their 2006 album, Triple Burner.

== Transportation ==
Park Extension is served by two Montreal Metro stations on the Blue line: Parc and Acadie

It is also served by Parc commuter rail station on Exo's Saint-Jérôme line (line 12). Parc station is adjacent to the old Park Avenue railway station, which operated between 1931 and 1984. It is now owned by Loblaws, which operated for a time a Joe Fresh outlet in the former station hall. The space between the station building and the railway line, where the original platforms were located, was occupied by a Provigo Le Marché supermarket and its vehicular access. As of 2022, a Maxi & Cie occupies the area.

== Fence with the Town of Mount Royal ==
A fence runs along the western border of Park Extension, on the opposite side of L'Acadie Boulevard in the Town of Mount Royal. While the stated purpose of the fence is to prevent children from running into the busy thoroughfare, some have contended that it was built to keep residents of the working-class Park Extension neighbourhood out of TMR.

The north–south streets of Parc Extension have the same names as those in line with them in Outremont, south of the railway tracks, from Hutchison Street in the east to Birnam in the west. McEachran Street was renamed L'Acadie Boulevard when the street was widened in the late 1950s. The area covered by the residences in the Town of Mount Royal from L'Acadie in the east to Rockland in the west and between Lockhart in the south to Cremazie in the north was once a 9-hole golf course. The golf course was sub-divided during the 1950s and the fence was erected after all the houses covered the golf course land.

This fence originally had several gates built into it, which then became a subject of controversy when they were locked one year at Halloween, preventing children from Park Extension from trick-or-treating in TMR. The Mount Royal town council responded by removing the gates. As of 2007, the gates were restored, with signs stating that this is for the safety of children and pedestrians.

== Education ==
The Commission scolaire de Montréal (CSDM) operates French-language public schools.

The English Montreal School Board (EMSB) operates English-language schools.

The Montreal Public Libraries Network operates the Parc-Extension library.

== Points of interest ==
- The Statue of the Greek immigrants is a gift from the Greek community of Montreal to the City of Montreal.
- The Park Extension library in the William Hingston community centre.
- The former studios for CFCF-TV, now the borough hall of Villeray–Saint-Michel–Parc-Extension.
- Koimisis tis Theotokou (Greek Orthodox church on Saint-Roch). (Currently being rebuilt after a fire)
- Howie Morenz Arena (Also known as Republic Arena).
- Greek Festival on Saint Roch (August 15).
- Le Piment Rouge was reopened in Park Ex after moving from Windsor Hotel.

== See also ==
- Greektown, Montreal
- Jarry Park
- Jarry Park Stadium
- Villeray–Saint-Michel–Parc-Extension
