= Louis Rubenstein =

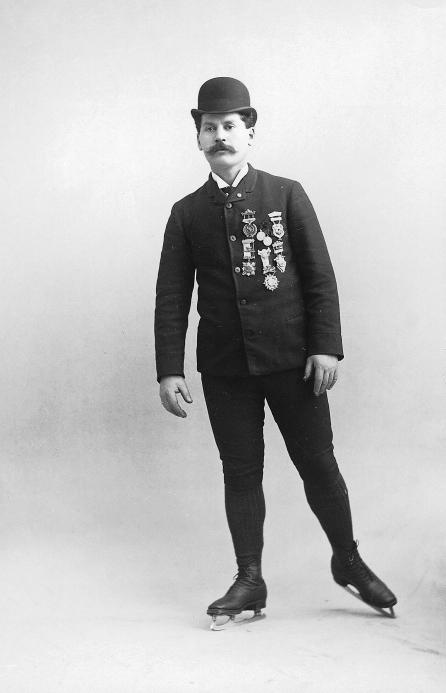
- Rubinstein in 1893.

Personal information
- Full name: Louis Rubenstein
- Born: September 23, 1861 Montreal, Canada East
- Died: January 3, 1931 (aged 69)
- Home town: Montreal, Quebec

Figure skating career
- Country: Canada

The fountain dedicated to Rubenstein's memory

Louis Rubenstein (September 23, 1861, in Montreal – January 3, 1931) was a Canadian figure skater, sportsman and politician. Rubenstein is considered the "Father of Canadian Figure Skating." After retirement from skating in 1892, Rubenstein became involved in the sports of bowling, curling, and cycling. He was elected president of the Canadian Bowling Association in 1895, president of the International Skating Union of America in 1909. He was alderman in St. Louis ward in Montreal from 1916 until 1931.

== Biography ==
Rubenstein was born and raised in Montreal, Canada East. His parents were Polish Jews who had fled Russian rule. He was coached by Jackson Haines.

Rubenstein was chosen to represent Canada in an unofficial international championships that were one of the precursors of the World Figure Skating Championships, in St. Petersburg, Russia. Although being subject of a great deal of antisemitism there, he won the gold medal. He is the only skater from North American known to have competed at a major European competition before World War 1 other than the 1908 Olympics, due to the time and money traveling required at the time.

Rubenstein helped organize the Amateur Skating Association of Canada, now known as Skate Canada. He served as the organization's president from its foundation until 1930.

He was President of the International Skating Union of America 1907–09, President of the Canadian Wheelmen's Association for 18 years, and President of the Montréal Amateur Athletic Association 1913–15.

Rubenstein was inducted into the International Jewish Sports Hall of Fame in 1981 and the World Figure Skating Hall of Fame in 1984.

There is a memorial water fountain dedicated to Rubenstein in Montreal at Parc Jeanne-Mance at the corner of Park Avenue and Mount Royal Avenues.

Rubenstein served as a Montreal alderman for 17 years. In 2016, he was named a National Historic Person.

== See also ==
- List of select Jewish figure skaters
- Victoria Skating Rink
