= Albert Chamberland =

Canadian violinist (1886–1975)

Albert Chamberland (12 October 1886 – 4 April 1975) was a Canadian violinist, composer, conductor, music producer, and music educator. As a violinist he performed as a chamber musician with a number of ensembles, including the Beethoven Trio with whom he made some early recordings for His Master's Voice during the first decade of the 20th century. He also made some solo recordings for His Master's Voice and was a concert soloist. He performed with a variety of orchestras, serving as the Montreal Symphony Orchestra's first concertmaster. Chamberland also created several compositions for band and orchestra.

== Early life and education ==
Born in Montreal, Chamberland began his musical training in his native city with Jean A. Duquette, before entering the conservatory at McGill University, where he was a pupil of Alfred De Sève. His sister Luce was a concert pianist and was married to bassist Ulysse Paquin.

== Career ==
Chamberland began his career as a violin soloist in 1904 at the age of 18. He soon began playing in J.-J. Goulet's Montreal Symphony Orchestra (no relation to the current orchestra of that name). From 1907 to 1910 he was a member of the Beethoven Trio and from 1910 to 1920 he played in the Dubois String Quartet.

In 1920 Chamberland helped found the Montreal Philharmonic Orchestra. That same year he was appointed the first violinist of the Chamberland String Quartet, whose members also included Norman Herschorn (2nd violin), Eugène Chartier (viola), and Raoul Duquette (cello). He played with that quartet through 1925. In 1921 he conducted the Societé du Musique de chambre. In 1932 he became a member of the Montreal Orchestra. He joined the newly formed Montreal Symphony Orchestra in 1934, serving as the orchestra's concertmaster (1934–1939) and then assistant conductor (1939–1948).

Chamberland worked as a music producer for the Canadian Broadcasting Corporation from 1937 to 1952. Some of the programs he was responsible for producing were CBC Radio's The Little Symphonies and Récital. His compositional output was relatively small, consisting of an Allegro militaire for band, a Sérénade for violin and piano, an Étude de concert d'après Rode, and a Fantaisie on the tune "Un Canadien errant". He performed the latter work at the Monument-National on 13 April 1926.

Chamberland taught music throughout his career, privately and on the music faculties of the Conservatoire de musique du Québec à Montréal, the Conservatoire national de musique, and the Villa Maria School. He was also active as music competition judge. Among his students were Alexander Brott, Isabelle Delorme, René Gagnier, Norman Herschorn, Lucien Martin, and Romain-Octave Pelletier II. He died in Montreal in 1975 at the age of 88.
