= Théâtre Fairmount =

Music venue in Montreal, Quebec, Canada

- Interactive map of Théâtre Fairmount
- Location: 5240, avenue du Parc; Montreal, Quebec, Canada; H2V 4G7
- Coordinates: 45.52055°N 73.598464°W
- Owner: Neon Productions Inc.
- Seating type: Standing room, Cabaret
- Capacity: 580 (Standing), 300 (Cabaret)
- Type: Nightclub, music venue

Construction
- Opened: 2015

Website
- www.theatrefairmount.com

Théâtre Fairmount is a music venue in Montreal, Quebec, Canada located at 5240 Park Avenue in the Mile End district.

== History ==
Théâtre Fairmount (or Fairmount Theatre) opened in March 2015 under the ownership of Neon Productions, a local promoter with over 15 years of experience with live shows. Previously the venue was known under the names Cabaret Mile-End, Kola Note and was the location for the original Club Soda which operated from 1983 until 1999 when it moved to their present-day location in the Quartier des Spectacles on Saint Laurent Boulevard.

Over the years the room has seen the likes of Soundgarden, Oasis, Robert Palmer, Rufus Wainwright, The Go-Betweens, Ben Harper and Fun, as well was known for week-long residencies by Quebec rock icons such as Michel Pagliaro.
