= Le Piment Rouge =

- Interactive map of Le Piment Rouge

Restaurant information
- Established: 1979 or 1980
- Owners: Hazel Mah and Chuck Mah
- Food type: Chinese
- Location: 495 Beaumont, Montreal, Quebec
- Coordinates: 45.5276°N 73.6197°W
- Website: pimentrouge.ca

Le Piment Rouge is a Chinese restaurant in Montreal. It was opened by Hazel Mah in 1979 or 1980. It became popular as a fine dining restaurant serving celebrities and businesspeople. The restaurant relocated from Metcalfe Street to the Windsor Hotel in 1990, where it remained until closing in 2014. In 2024, it was reopened as a casual, neighbourhood restaurant in Park Extension.

It became known for serving Canadian Chinese cuisine based on Sichuan and Cantonese cuisines, and for inventing Hunan dumplings.

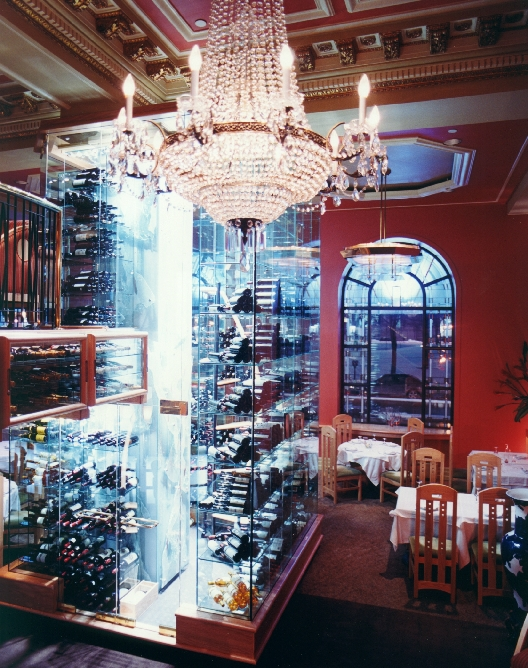
Inside of Le Piment Rouge in 1990.

== History ==
Le Piment Rouge was opened by owner Hazel Mah in Montreal in 1979 or 1980. Mah had previously opened the restaurant La Cuisine Impériale in Toronto. Le Piment Rouge was originally located on Metcalfe Street in downtown Montreal before relocating to a room in the Windsor Hotel in 1990. The restaurant was established as a fine dining restaurant, with high ceilings and luxurious interior design. Its status as a fine dining restaurant set it apart from the majority of Chinese restaurants in Montreal at the time, which were casual dining or buffet establishments.

The majority of its menu was based on Sichuan and Cantonese cuisine. The restaurant is known for inventing Hunan dumplings, a staple of Quebec Chinese food, in the 1980s. The dish is believed to be based on a Sichuan dumpling recipe that was modified to be less spicy. It was also known for serving shrimp on toast, sesame beef, crispy spinach, and millionaire's fried rice.

The restaurant was immediately popular. It was frequented by businesspeople, celebrities, and politicians, including Canadian prime ministers Jean Chrétien and Justin Trudeau.

The restaurant closed in 2014. In 2016, Hazel and Chuck Mah opened Piment 2 in Old Montreal. The menu was changed to include more items from Chinese cuisine as opposed to Westernized Canadian Chinese cuisine, although it continued to serve popular dishes like Hunan dumplings and General Tso's chicken.

Le Piment Rouge was reopened on Beaumont Street in Park Extension in 2024. The reopened restaurant was intended to be more casual and affordable than the original, and billed itself as a "neighbourhood restaurant". The restaurant's menu was designed by four chefs from Shanghai, to create dishes that were both authentic and appealing to Western palates.
