= Dubois String Quartet =

Canadian string quartet

The Dubois String Quartet (French: Quatuor à cordes Dubois) was a Canadian string quartet that actively performed for 28 consecutive seasons from 1910 to 1938. The ensemble was founded and led by cello player Jean-Baptiste Dubois, who was the only member of the group to play in every season. The other original members were violinists Albert Chamberland and Alphonse Dansereau and violist Eugene Schneider. Later members included violist Joseph Mastrocola and violinists Eugène Chartier, René Gagnier, Lucien Martin, Maurice Onderet, and Lucien Sicotte. The quartet was disbanded upon Dubois' death in July 1938.

The quartet performed frequently at Windsor Hall in Montreal from 1915 to 1927.
