= Park Avenue (Montreal) =

Major street in Quebec, Canada

Coordinates: 45°30′54.6″N 73°35′8.1″W

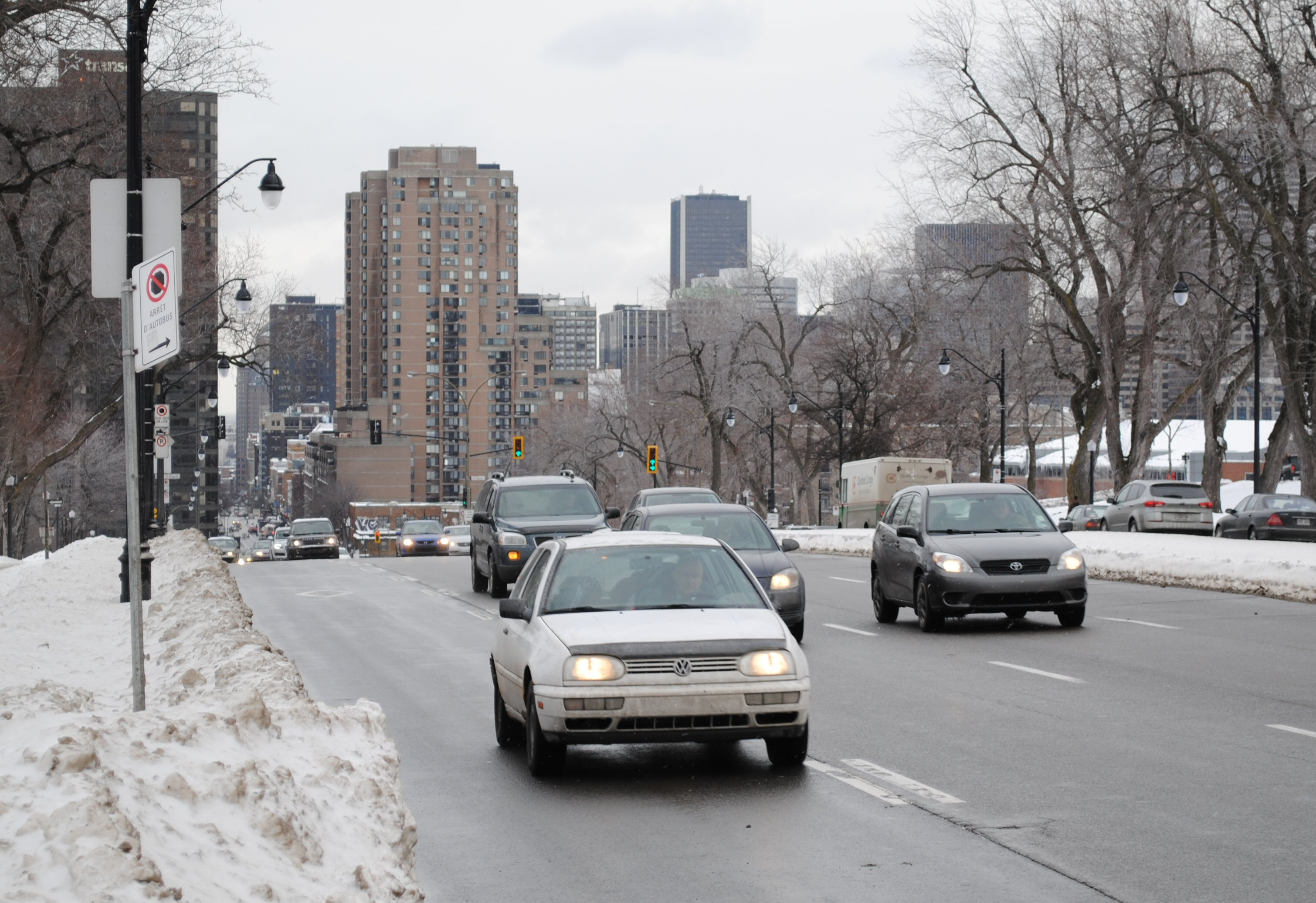
- Park Avenue near Pine Avenue
- Interactive map of Park Avenue
- Native name: avenue du Parc (French)
- Length: 5.7 km (3.5 mi)
- Location: Montreal
- South end: Sherbrooke Street
- Major junctions: A-40 (TCH); R-138
- North end: Chabanel Street; Jean-Talon Street for the main stretch
- South: Bleury Street

Park Avenue (officially in French: Avenue du Parc) is one of central Montreal's major north-south streets. It derives its name from Mount Royal Park, by which it runs. Between Mount Royal Avenue and Pine Avenue, the street separates the eastern side of the mountain park and the smaller Jeanne Mance Park (formerly known as Fletcher's Field and often referenced as such in Montreal literature).

South of Sherbrooke Street (i.e. through the downtown core), the street's name changes to Bleury Street, and south of Saint Antoine Street in Old Montreal, the name changes again to Saint Pierre Street. The northern end of Park Avenue is at Jean Talon Street, at the location of the former Canadian Pacific Railway Park Avenue station, which now serves the Parc Metro and commuter train station. There is also a short stretch of Park Avenue between Crémazie Boulevard and Chabanel Street.

Once one of Montreal's most elegant residential avenues, Park Avenue is now a busy commercial street, home to the former Rialto Theatre. Since 1924, it has also been an important part of Montreal's Greek community.

Park Avenue also lends its name to the Park Extension residential neighbourhood, located at its northern end.

== History ==
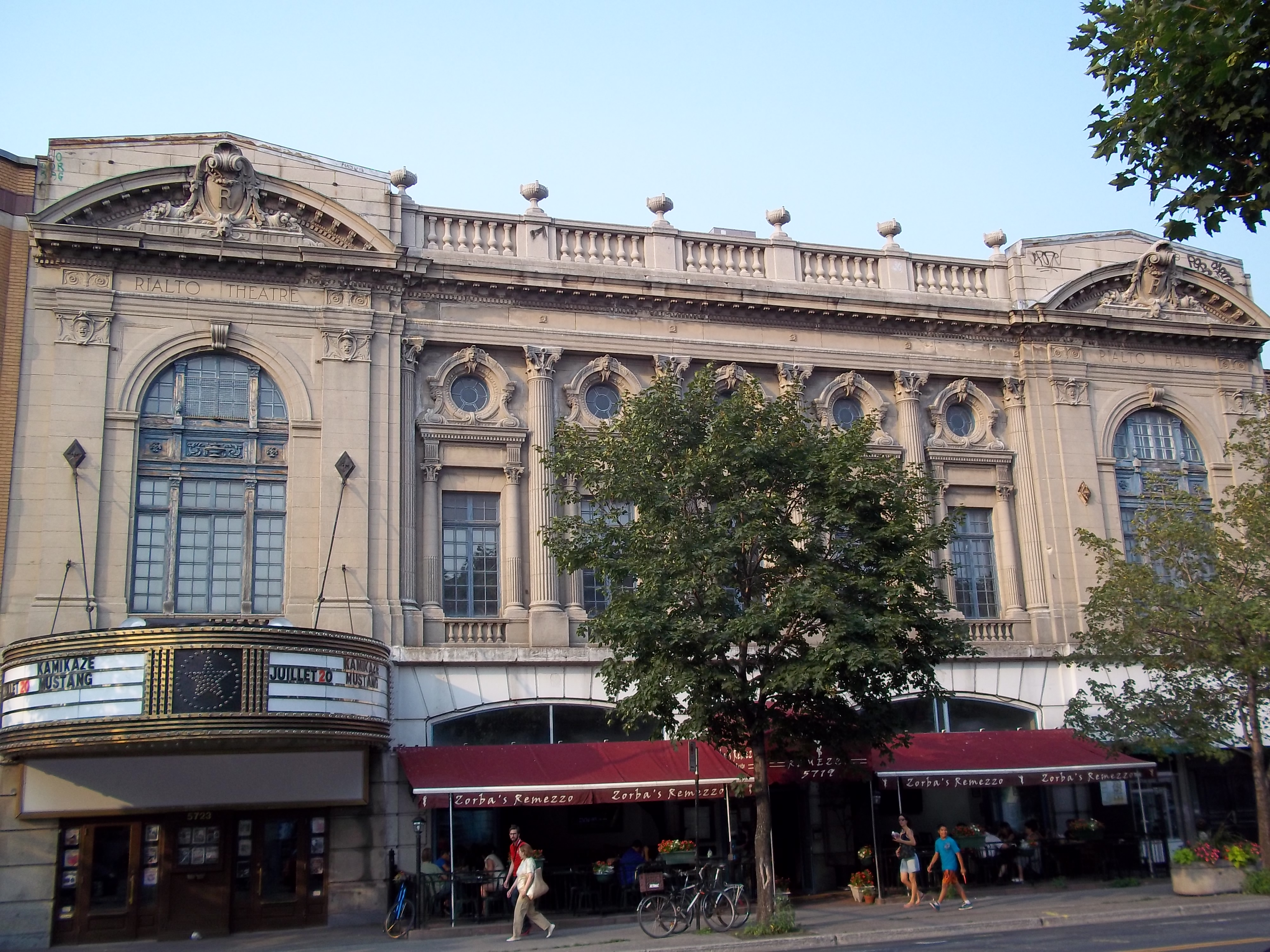
Former Rialto Theatre, July 2011.

In 1883, a request by English-speaking citizens was filed with the City of Montreal to name the street Park Avenue (in reference to Mount Royal Park, inaugurated in 1876). It was always officially referred to by its English name, Park Avenue, until September 29, 1961, when its French name, Avenue du Parc, was officially recognized.

In 1937, the government planned to change the name of the street to Marconi Street, but it decided to keep its current name following protests by citizens.

A similar event occurred on October 18, 2006 when Mayor Gérald Tremblay proposed to rename Park Avenue (along with Bleury Street) in honour of former Quebec premier Robert Bourassa. On November 28, Montreal City Council voted in favour (40-22) of the motion. If the Commission de toponymie du Québec had approved the change, Park Avenue and Bleury Street in their entirety would have been renamed Robert Bourassa Avenue. The proposal was controversial, especially in light of the historical nature of the name. (The STM's Parc Metro and RTM commuter rail station were to remain "Parc" due to a moratorium on renaming metro stations.) After Bourassa's family publicly expressed reservations about the controversy, Tremblay announced on February 6, 2007 that he would not pursue the issue further and that the council would be presented with a motion to withdraw the resolution made November 28. (A section of University Street was eventually renamed in honour of Bourassa, instead.)

In 2005, a C$25 million project began to transform the intersection of Pine Avenue and Park, known as the Pine-Park Interchange. Both Park and Pine Avenues remained open while the interchange was being demolished. It was replaced in the summer of 2006 with a more traditional ground-level intersection, which is easier for pedestrians and cyclists to navigate. The interchange had been the only constructed part of the proposed Autoroute 415.

== Greektown ==
Greektown is a proposed name for a neighbourhood located on Park Avenue between Mount Royal Avenue and Van Horne Avenue. Historically, Greek influence has been very strong in this area along with the adjoining Park Extension neighbourhood. There are over 61,000 Montrealers of Greek descent.

Montreal's Greektown was where fans celebrated the victory of Greece in the 2004 UEFA European Football Championship.

== Public transit ==
Bus routes along Park Avenue include the STM's 80 Avenue Du Parc, 365 Avenue du Parc and 480 Express du Parc. There are bus lanes along the length of the road (except for the short stretch passing through the borough of Rosemont-La Petite-Patrie). Place-des-Arts metro station is located on the De Bleury section of the street while Parc métro and train station are located near the intersection at Jean-Talon on Hutchison street.

Due to the high volume of bus passengers in the corridor, the city of Montreal has proposed building a tramway along the length of Park Avenue, which is projected to connect the city centre to the Exo's Parc commuter rail station and the Montreal Metro's Parc station. The Autorité régionale de transport métropolitain (ARTM) believes the tram has a potential ridership of 11,600 daily passengers.

== See also ==
- Théâtre Fairmount, a music venue on Park Avenue
- Black Watch Armoury, located on Bleury Street
