= Lucien Martin =

Canadian violinist, conductor, and composer

Lucien Martin (30 May 1908 – 29 October 1950) was a Canadian violinist, conductor, and composer. Only one of his compositions was published, the art song La Chanson des belles, which was performed by Jeanne Desjardins in its premiere on the CBC Radio program Sérénade pour cordes.

== Life and career ==
Born in Montreal, Martin was the son of violinist and string-instrument maker Cyrice Martin. He began his musical training with his father before entering the Conservatoire national de musique at the age of 7. He excelled at the school and earned a gold meld just a couple years later. He was named "the champion young violinist of the world" by the American press after a triumphant concert at the Central Theater in Biddeford, Maine in 1916.

Martin continued his violin studies in Montreal with Albert Chamberland (1917–1920), Alfred De Sève (1920–1923), and Camille Couture (1923–1925). He also studied harmony with Georges-Émile Tanguay. From 1925–1928 he toured the United States as a concert and recital violinist. He won the Prix d'Europe in 1931 which enabled him to pursue further studies in France at the École Normale de Musique de Paris with Maurice Hayot. He earned a 'licence de concert' from the school in 1933.

In July 1933 Martin returned to his native city. He was an active recitalist in Montreal and also appeared numerous times as a soloist on the radio during the 1930s and 1940s. He played in the first violin section of the Montreal Symphony Orchestra and was notably the featured soloist in the orchestra's second concert on 4 February 1935 in a performance of Max Bruch's Violin Concerto No. 1. La Presse said in its review of his performance that he played with a "passionate interpretation and confident technique."

In 1936 Martin returned to Paris where he worked with George Enescu. He returned to Montreal the following year to become the second violinist in the Dubois String Quartet with whom he played for one season. He also frequently played for radio programs on CKAC and on the CBC program Les Joyeux Troubadours during the late 1930s. During the 1940s he conducted a number of public concerts. He died in 1950 in Montreal at the age of 42.
