= Oscar Martel =

Canadian musician

Oscar Martel (February 1848 – 1924) was a Canadian violinist, composer and violin teacher.

== Early life ==
Born in L'Assomption, Quebec, Martel received his earliest violin instruction from his grandfather, Pierre Martel, who also made violins. He then studied at the Collège de L'Assomption and at the Royal Conservatory of Liège. He received instruction from Jules Hone.

== Career ==
Martel taught violin at the Collège de Montréal, and also taught at both the New England Conservatory and at the Chicago Musical College. His notable pupils included Eugène Chartier, Calixa Lavallée and Alfred De Sève.

Martel performed as a concert violinist in Montreal and Ottawa and in other parts of Quebec and Ontario. Some of his concerts were reviewed in a music magazine of the time, Le Canada musical: revue artistique et litteraire.

Martel created a number of compositions for violin, and he published a book containing arrangements of Canadian melodies with piano accompaniment.

== Personal life ==
Martel was married to soprano Hortense Fortin. He died in Chicago.
