= Windsor Hall (Montreal) =

Former performance venues

Coordinates: 45.4989°N 73.5711°W

Windsor Hall, also known as the Salle Windsor, was the name of two performance spaces attached to the Windsor Hotel in Montreal, Canada. The first Windsor Hall was a concert hall that sat 1300 people which was located next door to the Windsor Hotel. It was built in 1890 and demolished in 1906. During its 16 year history Windsor Hall was the resident performance space for the Montreal Philharmonic Society (1890–1899), the Montreal Symphony Orchestra (1894–1903), and the Montreal Oratorio Society (1902–1906).

The New York City Metropolitan Opera toured Windsor Hall in October 1896 under conductor Anton Seidl, and the hall was used for the Cycle of Musical Festivals of the Dominion of Canada in 1903 in concerts presented by Alexander Mackenzie. In February 1904 the Pittsburgh Symphony Orchestra performed in concerts led by Victor Herbert at Windsor Hall. Numerous well known musicians performed at Windsor Hall, among them Emma Albani, Lillian Nordica, the Kneisel Quartet, Vladimir de Pachmann, Ignacy Jan Paderewski, Emil Sauer, Ernestine Schumann-Heink, and Eugène Ysaÿe.

While predominantly a music venue, Windsor Hall was also used for other events such as lectures and early screenings of silent films. Winston Churchill gave a lecture there in December 1900 during his first visit to Canada. Charles Urban's film series Living Canada was presented at Windsor Hall over a six week period in 1903.

After Windsor Hall was demolished, the ballroom of Windsor Hotel was rechristened Windsor Hall. It too served as a performance and event space. The Dubois String Quartet performed there often from 1915 to 1927. The hotel also had its own resident chamber orchestra led by Jean-Yves Landry. The hall ceased being used when the hotel closed in 1981.
