= Hunan dumplings =

Dish from Canadian Chinese cuisine

- Alternative names: Peanut butter dumplings
- Place of origin: Montreal, Quebec
- Associated cuisine: Canadian Chinese cuisine
- Invented: circa 1980s
- Main ingredients: Pork wontons, peanut butter sauce

Hunan dumplings, also called peanut butter dumplings, are a dish from Canadian Chinese cuisine. It consists of pork wontons in a spicy peanut butter sauce and is associated with Montreal, where it was invented.

== History ==
Hunan dumplings were invented at Le Piment Rouge restaurant in Montreal in the 1980s. It was soon considered a staple of the restaurant, which was owned by Hazel Mah. The dish was originally based on a recipe from Sichuan cuisine consisting of pork dumplings covered in chopped peanuts, Sichuan peppercorns and chili oil. This original Sichuan dish was considered too spicy for Canadian palates at the time, and was adapted into a new Westernized recipe that is now called Hunan dumplings or peanut butter dumplings.

Hunan dumplings were popular at Montreal restaurants including Crystal Palace and Papillon de Szechuan in the 1980s and 1990s. The closure of many Westernized Sichuan restaurants in the early 21st century has made peanut butter dumplings less common, although they are still served at many restaurants in the city.

== Description ==
Hunan dumplings are made by coating pork wontons in a sauce consisting of peanut butter, sesame oil, soy sauce, and Sichuan peppercorns. Some recipes omit the Sichuan pepper.
