= Jean-Baptiste Dubois (cellist) =

Cellist, conductor, composer, and music educator

Jean-Baptiste Dubois (19 January 1870 — 4 July 1938) was a Belgian-born Canadian cellist, conductor, composer, and music educator. He was the founder of the Dubois String Quartet.

== Life and career ==
Born in Ghent on 19 January 1870, Dubois was the son of musician Alphonsus Josephus Dubois and Anna Catharina Laevaert. He studied cello with Jean-Baptiste Rappé and Jules de Swert at the Ghent Conservatory (GC). From the age of 13 he worked in a variety of orchestras in Ghent in the 1880s and early 1890s. He taught at the GC from 1885 to 1891.

At the invitation of Canadian bandmaster Ernest Lavigne, Dubois came to Montreal, Canada where he served as both assistant conductor and principal cellist of the Sohmer Park orchestra from 1891 to 1894. He also was principal cellist of the Opéra français de Montreal in the 1890s. In 1896 he briefly returned to Europe before permanently moving to Canada that same year.

Dubois was the founder of the Dubois String Quartet with whom he played from 1910 until his death in 1938. He taught on the music faculties at a variety of music conservatories and universities in Canada; among them the Collège de Montréal, the McGill Conservatory, the Canadian Academy of Music, and the Conservatoire de musique du Québec. As a composer he wrote a small number of compositions for the cello; the best known of which is Élégie for cello and piano which was published in 1925 by Édition Belgo-Canadienne.

Dubois married Caroline Derome, whose children from a prior marriage included cellist Rosario Bourdon and the singer Louis-Honoré Bourdon. His son with Caroline, Jules Dubois, was also a cellist.

Dubois died in Montreal on 4 July 1938.
