= Skate Canada =

National governing body in Canada

- Sport: Figure skating
- Jurisdiction: Canada
- Founded: 1887
- Affiliation: International Skating Union
- Headquarters: 261 – 1200 St. Laurent Blvd. Box 15, Ottawa, ON, K1K 3B8, CANADA
- President: Karen Butcher

Official website
- www.skatecanada.ca
- (Canada)

Skate Canada (Canadian French: Patinage Canada, lit. "Skating Canada") is the national governing body for figure skating in Canada, recognized by the International Skating Union and the Canadian Olympic Committee. It organizes the annual Canadian Figure Skating Championships, the fall Skate Canada International competition, other national and international skating competitions in Canada, and the Skate Canada Hall of Fame.

The organization was founded in 1888 as the Amateur Skating Association of Canada for speed and figure skating by Louis Rubenstein of Montreal's Victoria Skating Club. Later, in 1914, it was renamed name as The Figure Skating Department of Canada, remaining a section of the Amateur Skating Association of Canada. In 1939, it changed its name to the Canadian Figure Skating Association (CFSA), and dissociated from the Amateur Skating Association in 1947. The organization's current name, Skate Canada, was adopted in 2000 for consistency with the names of other national sports organizations in Canada.

Skate Canada claims to be "the oldest and largest figure skating organization in the world". The vast majority of members are not elite competitors, but recreational skaters.

== History ==
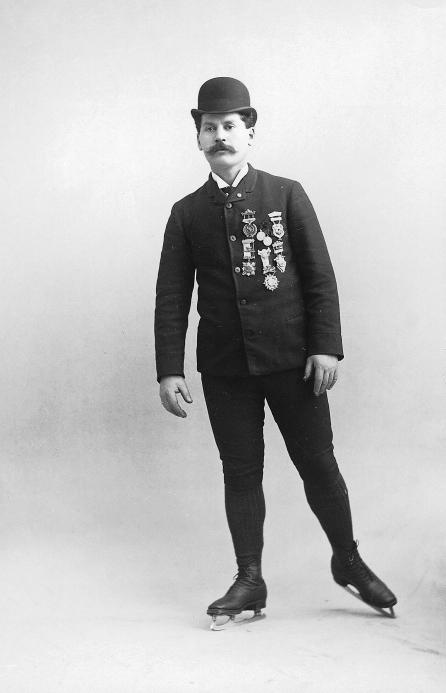
Louis Rubenstein

The earliest skating association in Canada was the Amateur Skating Association of Canada, formed by Louis Rubenstein of Montreal's Victoria Skating Club in 1888 for both speed and figure skating. In 1914, the Figure Skating Department of Canada, formed as a section of the Amateur Skating Association of Canada stemming from the recognition of figure skating as a sport distinct from speed skating. Although an unofficial Canadian national championships was held in 1905, the first official competition, organized by the Figure Skating Department of Canada, took place in 1914, in the city of Ottawa.

In 1939, the Figure Skating Department of Canada was renamed as the Canadian Figure Skating Association (CFSA). In 1947, it became independent from the Amateur Skating Association of Canada, and instead operated in direct affiliation with the International Skating Union, and an ISU national office was correspondingly established in Ottawa by Charles H. Cumming. The office was run on a volunteer basis from 1947 until 1958, when Cumming was hired as the first full-time employee of the CFSA.

In 1973, Calgary hosted the CFSA's first Skate Canada International in Calgary. This event would later be incorporated into the ISU Grand Prix of Figure Skating when it was established in 1995 and is the oldest Grand Prix event.

The CFSA's first national team was conceived in 1981, followed by its junior national team in 1991. In 1990, the Canadian Figure Skating Hall of Fame was established and the first members were inducted in a ceremony at the CFSA's annual meeting in Edmonton.

In 2000, the Canadian Figure Skating Association changed its name to Skate Canada.

In 2020, Skate Canada announced a SafeSport program for the prevention and management of misconduct, injury and general disputes. In 2021, in response to the COVID-19 pandemic, Skate Canada held its first virtual competition, the 2021 Skate Canada Challenge.

Skate Canada has worked for some years to make its sport more inclusive, regardless of gender. It has reworked the language of its bylaws and in 2019 it provided that teams in its non-elite programs would be defined as two skaters, rather than one male and one female. In 2022, it adopted that definition for its podium pathway as well, becoming the first national skating federation to do so.

On December 16, 2025, Skate Canada announced that it would no longer host any national or international events in Alberta, in response to that province's legislation requiring participants in sporting events to compete based on their gender assigned at birth. Skaters in Alberta could continue to participate in local skating events and Skate Canada events in other parts of the country. Premier Danielle Smith has condemned the policy, calling it disgraceful, and stating that she expected Skate Canada to apologise and revert the policy.

== Organizational structure ==
Skate Canada's headquarters are in Ottawa, Ontario. The organization also has 10 sectional offices which coordinate much of the local activity within their respective areas.

| Section name | Abbreviation | Official website |
|---|---|---|
| British Columbia / Yukon | BC/YK | website |
| Alberta / NWT / Nunavut | AB/NT/NU | website |
| Saskatchewan | SK | website |
| Manitoba | MB | website |
| Ontario | ON | website |
| Quebec | QC | website |
| New Brunswick | NB | website |
| Nova Scotia | NS | website |
| Prince Edward Island | PE | website |
| Newfoundland and Labrador | NL | website |

Ontario formerly had four offices, Eastern Ontario, Central Ontario, Western Ontario and Northern Ontario. However, these merged in 2017 to receive provincial funding.

== Notable people ==
- Lou Lefaive, executive director of the Canadian Figure Skating Association from 1983 to 1986
