= Philippe Djokic =

Canadian violinist, conductor, and music educator

- Born: September 3, 1950 (age 75); Nancy, France
- Occupation(s): Violinist; Conductor

Philippe Djokic (born 3 September 1950) is a Canadian violinist, conductor, and music educator. He became a naturalized Canadian citizen in 1990.

== Biography ==
Born in Nancy, France, Djokic was the son of a Serbian father and French mother. His father had been a prisoner in a concentration camp during World War II and after the war he was put in charge of organizing displaced Serbian soldiers and immigrants by the United States Army. The Djokic clan's roots are from Požega, Serbia.

In 1952, the Djokics settled in Trenton, New Jersey. Here, all seven children would study classical music; learning to play a variety of instruments such as the piano, cello and violin. Philippe attended the acclaimed Juilliard School in New York City where he was a pupil of Christine Dethier and Ivan Galamian. He would meet his bride-to-be, Lynn Stodola, there. She is a pianist. Both would eventually move to Halifax, Nova Scotia in 1975 to teach at Dalhousie University. Mr. Djokic is now the Professor of Violin. He has also conducted the Dalhousie Orchestra.

In 1977, he won first prize in the CBC Talent Festival. Two years earlier, Djokic won the Marguerite Long-Jacques Thibault competition in Paris, France, along with the Sibelius Violin Competition in Helsinki, Finland. Upon obtaining his Master of Music degree as a student at the Juilliard School, Djokic also won the school's Fritz Kreisler Prize. In 1989 he formed the "De Sève Quartet" with Marcelle Mallette (2nd violin), Douglas McNabney (viola), and Pierre Djokic (cello) in Toronto. Named in honour of violinist Alfred De Sève, the ensemble made its debut at the 1989 Festival superphonique in Lachine. He and his wife's musical talents were passed down to their children Marc Djokic, a violinist, and Denise Djokic, a cellist.

His son Marc Djokic was awarded the Mécénat Musica Prix Goyer in 2017.
