= Alfred De Sève =

Canadian violinist, composer, and music educator

Alfred De Sève (May or June 1858 – 25 November 1927) was a Canadian violinist, composer, and music educator. His compositional output includes works for violin and piano, solo piano, and orchestra; many of which were published by Arthur P. Schmidt and Charles H. Ditson.

== Life and career ==
Born in Saint-Henri, Montreal, De Sève was a child prodigy and began studying the violin with Oscar Martel at the age of seven. After just six months of lessons, he gave his first public recital to critical acclaim. He later studied with Frantz Jehin-Prume in Montreal and in 1876 studied in Paris with Pablo de Sarasate, Hubert Léonard, and Lambert Massart. From 1877 to 1879 he studied with Henri Vieuxtemps in Paris and during that time served as Isabella II of Spain's court violinist in addition to his active career as a concert violinist with a number of Paris orchestras and musical ensembles. After building his reputation in Europe, he returned to his native country and quickly became active as a concert violinist. He was accompanied in recitals by the pianist Joséphine Bruneau and the two married in 1880.

In 1881 De Sève relocated to Boston, Massachusetts in the United States to join the faculty of the New England Conservatory. In 1891 he was appointed choirmaster at the Cathedral of the Holy Cross after the death of Calixa Lavallée. He was also a member of the Boston Symphony Orchestra (BSO) and appeared as a soloist with the BSO on a number of occasions. His 18 February 1882 performance of Felix Mendelssohn's Violin Concerto and 15 December 1883 performance of Camille Saint-Saëns' Introduction and Rondo Capriccioso were some of the earliest appearances of a Canadian musician with a major symphony orchestra in the United States. He toured the United States several times with the BSO, and also served as the concertmaster of the Boston Philharmonic.

De Sève returned to Saint-Henri in 1899 to join the music faculty at McGill University. By this time he had amassed a large personal fortune and he spent a considerable amount of time managing his personal assets. He was also active as a private violin instructor. Some of his notable students included Alexander Brott, Albert Chamberland, Eugène Chartier, René Gagnier, Lucien Martin, and Ethel Stark. He died in Montreal in 1927 at the age of 69. A street in has native city was named in his honour in 1931 and the "De Sève Quartet" was founded in Montreal in 1989; a group which included violinist Philippe Djokic.
