= Garment District, Montreal =

Garment District Cité de la Mode
- Neighbourhood
- Location of Garment District in Montreal
- Coordinates: 45.539857°N 73.653935°W
- Country: Canada
- Province: Quebec
- City: Montreal
- Borough: Ahuntsic-Cartierville
- Postal Code: H2N
- Area codes: 514, 438

The Garment District (French: Cité de la Mode) is a neighbourhood in the city of Montreal, Quebec, Canada. It is located primarily along Chabanel Street in the Ahuntsic neighbourhood of the Ahuntsic-Cartierville borough. The Chabanel Station (train) is located close by.

== History ==
Montreal's Garment District was originally located downtown on De Maisonneuve Boulevard between Berri Street and Saint Laurent Boulevard. Furriers such as the Hudson's Bay Company and warehouses lined the streets in this area at the time.

The Garment District later moved to the Mile End neighbourhood in the northernmost edge of the borough of Le Plateau-Mont-Royal. The massive 1960s buildings built by the fur traders along De Gaspé Street still stand today.

It has since moved again to its current location, along Chabanel Street. From 1964 to 1985 and running from Saint-Laurent Boulevard in the east to Meilleur Avenue in the west, eight large multi-storey buildings were built along Chabanel. The first address is 99 Chabanel (500,000 sq. ft.), followed by 111, 125, 225, 333, 433 and 555 Chabanel followed. The largest of the buildings is 333 Chabanel (approximately one million square feet) which boasts the second largest floorplate on the island of Montreal (110,000 sq. ft.) after Place Bonaventure. The total square footage of the buildings along Chabanel is estimated at five million. The street is still considered the centre of the fashion industry in Canada, with several hundred companies and thousands of employees operating from Chabanel addresses. However, in recent years with manufacturing moving offshore due to the G-8 policy of "trade-not-aid" for Least Developed Countries (LDCs) Market Access Initiative, contraction in the industry and vacancy rates increasing, there has been a move to promote the area to other industries, and one of the buildings (125 Chabanel) has been slated to be redeveloped as a residential condominium project.

== Chabanel in Literature ==
The novel The Rent Collector by B. Glen Rotchin which was a finalist for the Amazon.ca/Books in Canada First Novel Award is set at 99 Chabanel.

Leonard Cohen's father, Nathan, was involved in the garment trade in Montreal. In Cohen's novel, "Beautiful Losers," a significant lengthy scene between the narrator and his friend F occurs on the floor of a garment factory in Montreal amidst the machinery for manufacturing cloth.
