= Eugène Chartier =

Canadian musician

Eugène Chartier (1893 – 1 November 1963) was a Canadian violinist, violist, conductor, and teacher.

Born in Montreal, Chartier studied the violin with Alfred De Sève and Oscar Martel. He played second violin with the Dubois String Quartet from 1915 to 1920, and viola with the Chamberland String Quartet from 1920 to 1925. He also played viola in the CMS Orchestra, the Montreal Festivals, and the Montreal Orchestra. In 1922, he founded the orchestra of the Conservatoire national de musique in Montreal, which became the Montreal Philharmonic Orchestra, giving concerts at the Mount Royal Hotel. He began teaching at the Conseratoire in 1925, and also taught at the colleges of Terrebonne and Berthier, and the convent of Ste-Émilie de Viauville. He was appointed director of the Maisonneuve regimental band in 1932, and became a founding member of the Euterpe Chamber Music Society in 1933. He conducted the CMS Orchestra and some of his performances were broadcast on CBC radio. He conducted the premiere of the comic opera Père des Amours by Eugène Lapierrein 1942.
