= Windsor Hotel (Montreal) =

Hotel in Montreal, Quebec, Canada

Coordinates: 45°29′56″N 73°34′16″W

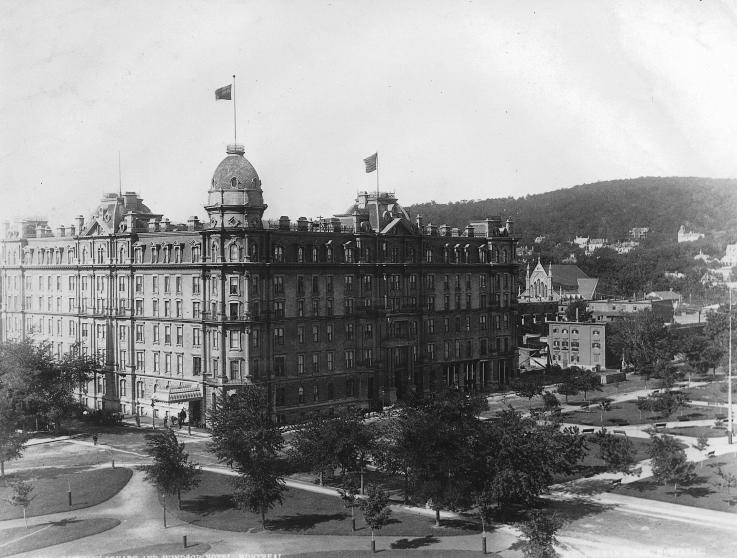
- The Windsor Hotel circa 1890
- Interactive map of the Windsor Hotel area

General information
- Type: Hotel
- Location: Montreal, Quebec, Canada
- Construction started: 1875
- Completed: 1878, 1906 (North Annex)
- Destroyed: 1957 (all but North Annex)
- Cost: CAD$500,000 (1878)

Website
- https://lewindsormontreal.com/en

The Windsor Hotel (opened 1878, closed 1981) was a hotel located in Montreal, Quebec, Canada. It is often considered to be the first grand hotel in Canada, and for decades billed itself as "the best in all the Dominion".

== Early years ==
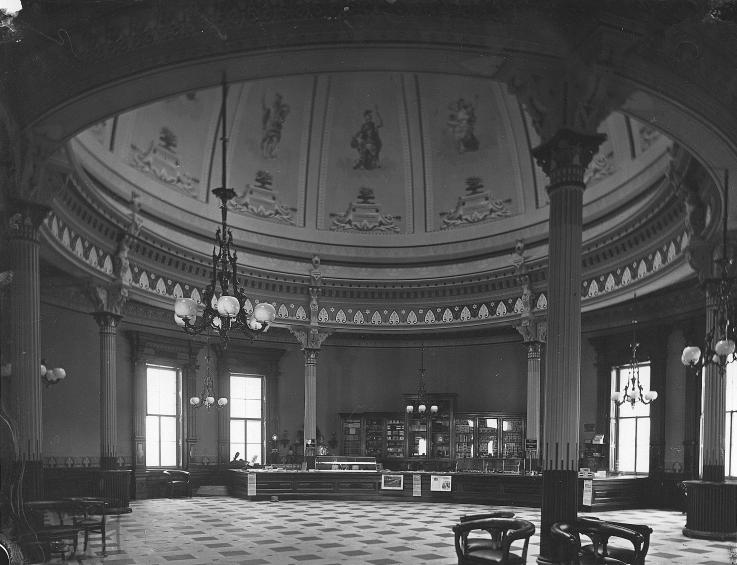
The hotel's lobby rotunda in 1878

The hotel was designed by G. H. Worthing and constructed between 1875 and 1878 by the Windsor Hotel Company consortium of six Montreal businessmen, including William Notman. It was capitalized at C$500,000. At the time Montreal was Canada's largest city, and the centre of commerce in the young country. The consortium was formed to construct an opulent new hotel to symbolize the city's growing prominence and wealth. As of 1889, the hotel was accessed by visitors from outside of Montreal through Windsor Station, which was designed by New York architect Bruce Price).

The hotel opened without fanfare on January 28, 1878. Soon after, an opening gala was held that was the largest social gathering Montreal had ever seen. It was attended by the Right Honourable Sir John A. Macdonald, Princess Louise and the Marquess of Lorne.

The hotel was not an immediate success. It was leased by the consortium to James Worthington and losses led to the operation being returned to the consortium to run. Instead of retrenching, the hotel expanded to include the 'Stanley Street Wing'. The hotel was buoyed by the successes of the Montreal Winter Carnivals of the 1880s, which were held in the square outside the hotel.

The Windsor Hotel was soon at the centre of Montreal's social and business worlds, attracting not only railway visitors, but also business leaders, politicians, socialites, artists, and even royalty. The hotel was home to both the annual St. Andrew's Society Ball and the Winter Carnival Ball, the former being a mainstay of the hotel and of Montreal's social calendar for nearly a century. Sarah Bernhardt, Mark Twain, Dolores Costello, Rudyard Kipling, Fanny Davenport, Lillie Langtry and Oscar Wilde were among the Windsor's famous guests in its early years.

In 1890 the hotel built a concert hall, Windsor Hall, next door to the hotel. It was original venue for the Montreal Symphony Orchestra among other music ensembles in the city. The hall was demolished in 1906; after which one of the ballrooms inside the hotel was renamed Windsor Hall and became a venue for concerts.

== Expansion ==
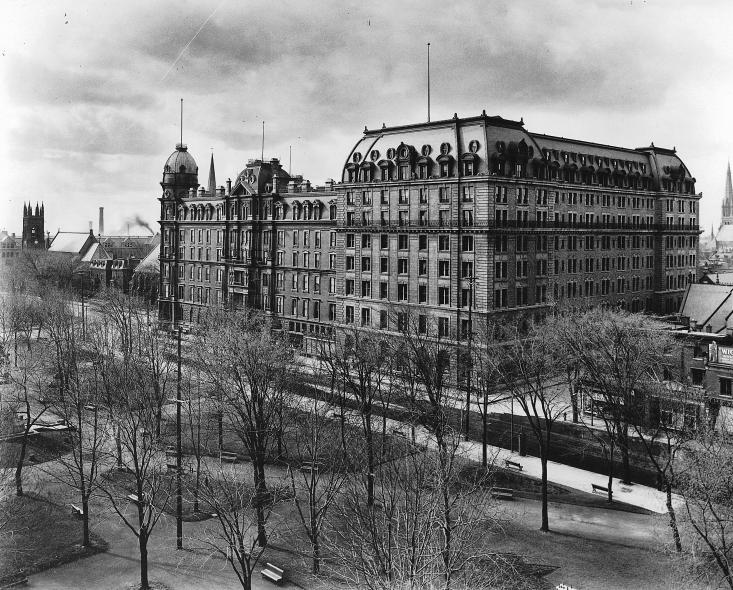
Windsor Hotel and expansion in 1906

In 1906, a fire destroyed almost 100 guest rooms. The fire did not adversely impact the hotel's success or reputation, but simply prompted significant renovations and the addition of a new wing designed by Henry Janeway Hardenberg, known as the Windsor Annex, to the north of the original building. The number of rooms more than doubled, going from 368 to 750, and the hotel now occupied an entire city block. The north annex contained the famous "Peacock Alley" (named after the peacock designs in its stained glass windows), and two additional ballrooms. Unlike the rest of the hotel, the north annex was designed in the Second Empire style. The new annex cost C$1 million to construct and opened in 1908.

The success of the hotel helped draw large commercial enterprises to this part of Montreal, including Morgan's and Ogilvy's, and contributed to the slow decline of Montreal's other grand railway hotel, the Hotel Place Viger.

== Montreal's pre-eminent hotel ==
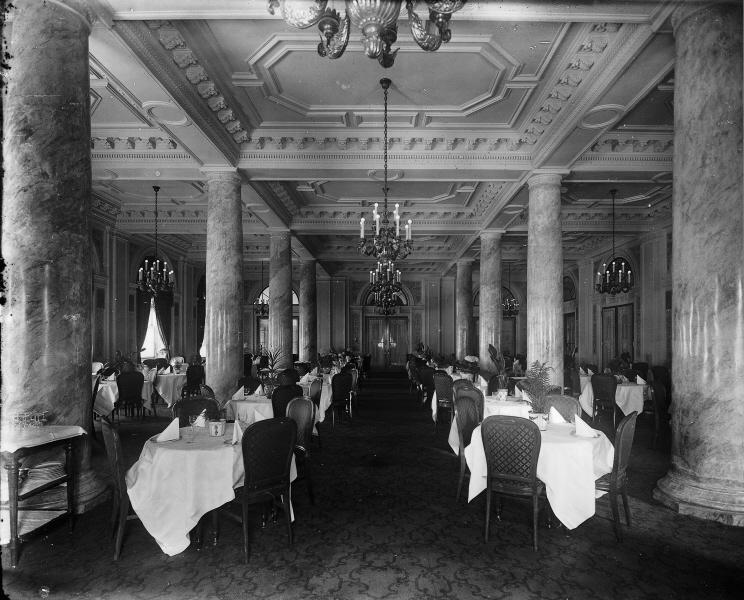
The grand dining room in 1916

In 1917, the owners of the Montreal Canadiens, the Quebec Bulldogs, the Ottawa Senators and Montreal Wanderers met in one of the Windsor Hotel's restaurants to form the National Hockey League. In 1919, the Dominion of Canada Football Association (today known as the Canadian Soccer Association) held its fifth General Meeting at the Windsor, the first after a four-year hiatus because of the Great War.

Executives of both the Canadian Pacific Railway and Grand Trunk Railway kept permanent residences in the hotel, making the Windsor home to men who controlled most of Canada's transportation infrastructure and much of its economy. In his later years, Stephen Leacock spent his winters living in the Windsor Hotel. Some of Leacock's writing, and much of his correspondence, was written on hotel stationery.

During the first ever royal tour of Canada by a reigning monarch, King George VI and Queen Elizabeth stayed at the Windsor Hotel, and their arrival on May 18, 1939, attracted throngs of well-wishers to the hotel. The crowds were so large that one man died of a heart attack, many others collapsed due to heat and exhaustion, and the police found 64 children that had been separated from their parents. At a state banquet in the hotel prepared by chef Gabriel Meunier, Montreal's francophone mayor, Camillien Houde, famously remarked in his address to the monarchs: "I thank you from the bottom of my heart for coming. And my wife thanks you from her bottom, too."

== Decline ==
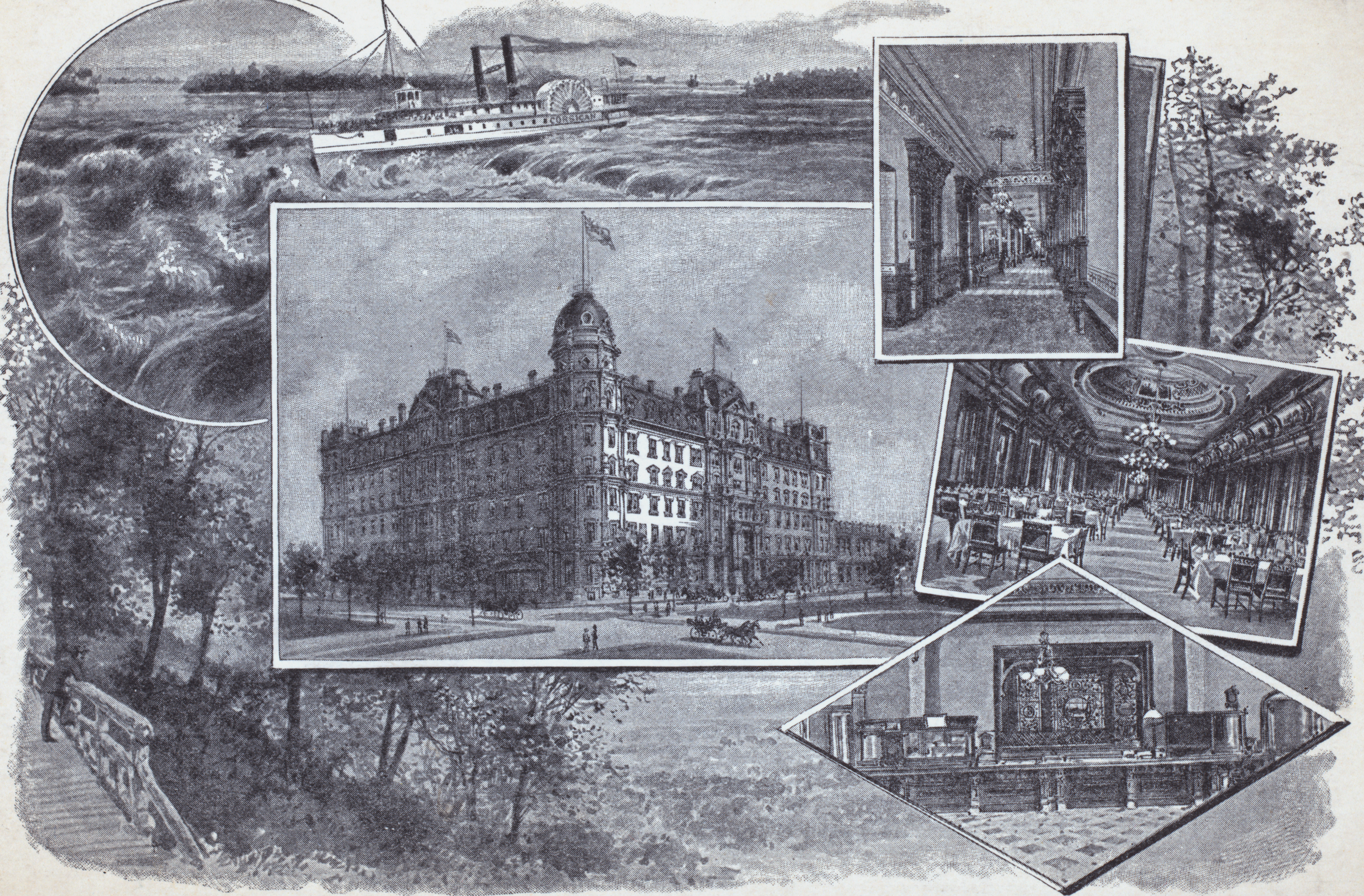
Breakfast at the Windsor Hotel, 1891

In 1957, another fire destroyed a third of the hotel. This time the damage was extensive, and the original hotel structure had to be demolished. The cupola, weighing some 15 tons, came down on August 12, 1959. Within the next five years, the Tour CIBC office tower was constructed on the site of the original hotel.

The North Annex was all that remained of the Windsor Hotel, but it did contain 200 guest rooms, two ballrooms and Peacock Alley. The Windsor Hotel continued to operate out of the North Annex for almost another 25 years, but competition from newer hotels led to the Windsor's slow decline. In 1975, Dolores Costello returned to the hotel for her seventieth birthday party, in honour of the hotel that had been her second home decades earlier. This party was perhaps the last true glimpse of the hotel's former grandeur before the Windsor's closure in 1981.

== Conversion of North Annex to office building ==
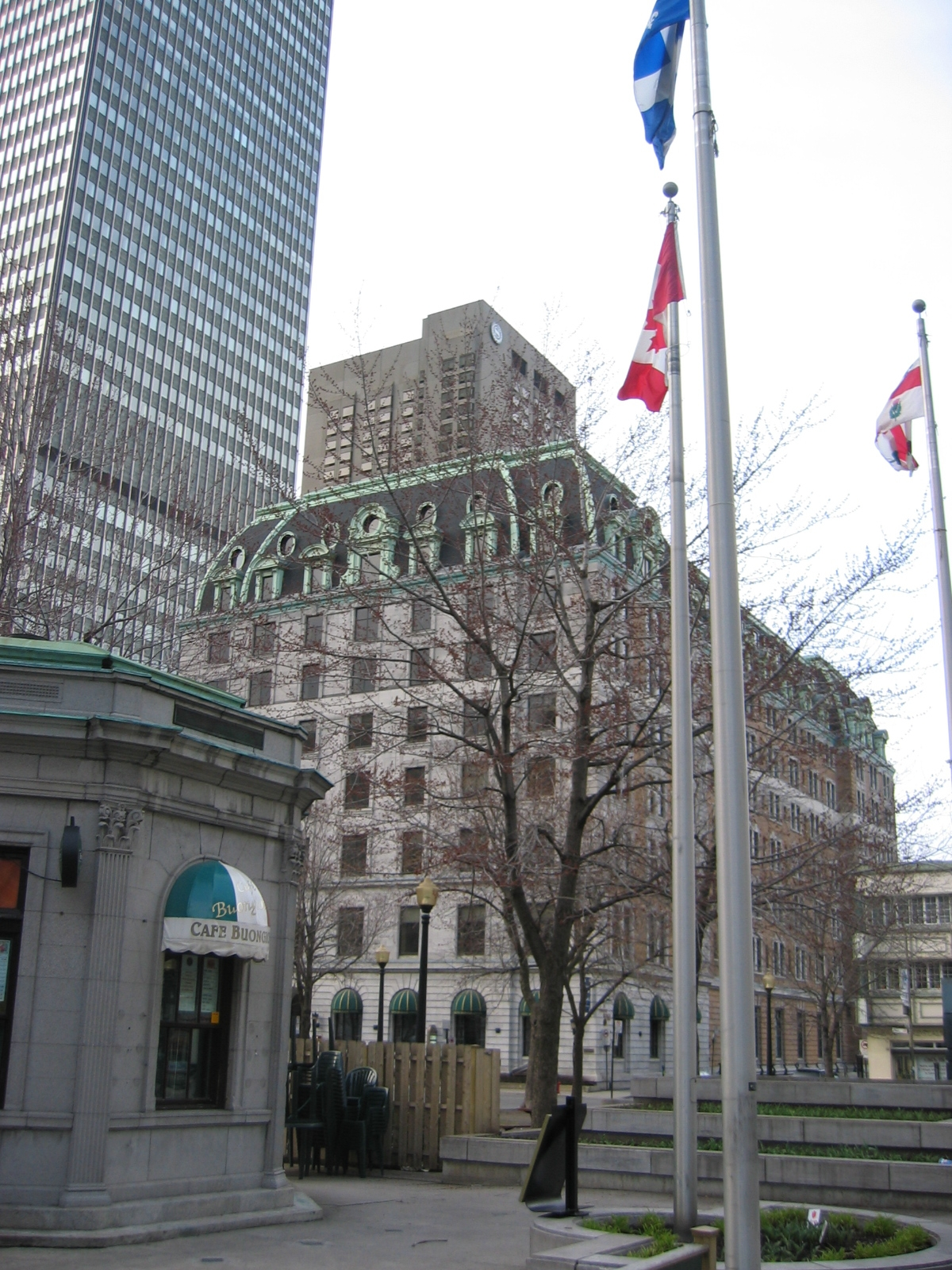
Le Windsor office building in 2006

In 1987, the Windsor Hotel reopened as an office building called "Le Windsor".

In 2006, the building was once again renovated with a total project cost of $15 million.

The office building currently houses the headquarters for Valeurs mobilières Desjardins, the securities and investment banking division of Desjardins Group, and Claridge, the trust management offices for the Bronfman family.

The Chinese restaurant Le Piment Rouge was relocated to the hotel in 1990 and remained there until 2014.

=== Preservation of the ballrooms ===
Peacock Alley and a number of marble staircases have been preserved, and the two ballrooms are still used for banquets, wedding receptions and conferences.

Le Windsor's ground floor space along the front façade has been occupied by Le Piment Rouge, a Chinese restaurant and bar-lounge, for nearly three decades. During their 1988 and 1999 renovations, the restaurant restored and preserved a number of the North Annex's original architectural and design features, included ornate plaster ceilings, arched stained glass windows, and Austrian crystal chandeliers. Since 2016, the space is acquired by the management of the Windsor Ballrooms and is another event space for rent. During the 2017 renovation, the bar and most of the balcony were removed.

== See also ==
- Donegana's Hotel, Montreal
- Ritz-Carlton Montreal
