= List of Boston Conservatory people =

This is a partial listing of notable Boston Conservatory at Berklee alumni and faculty.

== Notable alumni ==
=== Music Division ===
- Lily Afshar, guitarist
- Gustavo Assis-Brasil, guitarist and composer
- George Bassman, Broadway orchestrator and songwriter
- Edward Boatner, composer and arranger
- Elizabeth Borton de Trevino, Newbery Award-winning author
- Patrick Greene, composer and classical musician
- Marva Griffin Carter, musicologist, author, and professor of music at Georgia State University
- Gigi Gryce, jazz musician and composer
- Jonathon Heyward, conductor
- Louise Le Baron, opera and musical theatre singer
- Lorraine Hunt Lieberson, opera singer
- Victoria Livengood, opera singer
- Perry George "P.G." Lowery, cornetist and famed leader of the Ringling Brothers Barnum & Bailey Circus Sideshow band
- Alejandro L. Madrid, musicologist, author, and professor of music at Harvard University
- Makanda Ken McIntyre, jazz musician
- Margaret French McLean, musician and First Lady of North Carolina
- Andreas Poulimenos, professor of music at the Jacobs School of Music
- Don Redman, jazz musician, arranger, and composer
- Sam Rivers, jazz musician and composer
- Geoff Sewell, singer
- Slam Stewart, jazz musician

=== Theater Division ===
- Kawa Ada, Broadway actor and writer
- Nick Adams, Broadway actor
- Gerard Alessandrini, creator and lyricist, Forbidden Broadway
- Marlain Angelides, Greek pop singer, competed for Cyprus in Eurovision Song Contest 1999
- David Benoit, Broadway: Les Misérables, Avenue Q, Jekyll and Hyde, and touring productions of Phantom of the Opera, All Shook Up, Young Frankenstein, Forbidden Broadway alum
- Jennifer R. Blake, Off-Broadway: The Donkey Show (original cast)
- Measha Brueggergosman, Canadian opera singer
- John Cardoza, Broadway: Young Noah in The Notebook (original cast), Christian in Moulin Rouge! The Musical, Jagged Little Pill (original cast)
- Angela Christian, Broadway: Anne Catherick in The Woman in White, Dorothy Brown in Thoroughly Modern Millie
- Erin Davie, on Broadway as Charlotte in A Little Night Music, Niki Harris in Curtains, and Little Edie in Grey Gardens
- Laura Dreyfuss, Broadway: Zoe Murphy in Dear Evan Hansen, television: Madison McCarthy on the FOX musical series Glee, McAfee Westbrook on the Netflix series The Politician
- Andrew Durand, Tony Award-nominated Broadway actor
- Kimiko Glenn, actress, singer, voice actor, and Broadway performer; portrayed Brook Soso in the Netflix original series Orange is the New Black
- Josh Grisetti, Broadway, TV and film actor, in Broadway Bound, Enter Laughing
- Josie de Guzman, Broadway actor and singer
- Meredith Hagner, actress
- Jason Jurman, TV and film actor, in The Bedford Diaries, Cougar Club, Law & Order
- Chad Kimball, Broadway actor and singer in Memphis as Huey (lead) on Broadway
- Eddie Korbich, Broadway actor, singer, and dancer
- Nikka Graff Lanzarone, Broadway actor and dancer
- Mark Lawson, actor
- Rachael MacFarlane, voice actress and singer
- Constantine Maroulis, American Idol Season 4 contestant (1998–2002), Broadway actor and singer, 2009 Tony nominee for Leading Actor in a Musical for Rock of Ages
- Katharine McPhee, American Idol Season 5 contestant (2003—2005), actor and recording artist (attended but did not graduate)
- Travis Nesbitt, Final Mark in Altar Boyz Off-Broadway in 2010; creator and lead of The Boy Band Project, 2019 Broadway World Award winner for "Best Group Show"
- Jack Noseworthy, Broadway actor and singer
- Chris Olsen, Internet personality and actor
- Carlos Pena Jr., finalist on MTV's Making Menudo and Nickelodeon show Big Time Rush
- Hayley Podschun, Broadway and film actor, singer, dancer (Broadway: The Sound of Music, Tammy in Hairspray, Sunday in the Park with George, Pal Joey, Anything Goes, Mildred Harris in Chaplin; film: Tammy in Hairspray; national tour: Glinda in Wicked - 2nd national tour)
- Peter Reckell, TV actor
- Reva Rice, stage actress
- Claire Rochester, vaudeville
- Drew Sarich, Broadway, European actor and singer
- Alexis Scheer, playwright and screenwriter
- Keesha Sharp, Monica on Girlfriends, Pam in Why Did I Get Married?, NAACP Image Award nominee for Best Supporting Actress
- Jennifer Simard, Broadway actress
- Nikki Snelson, Broadway actress and singer
- Jan Sport, singer and drag queen, RuPaul's Drag Race and RuPaul's Drag Race All Stars contestant
- Natalie Toro, Broadway actor and singer
- Lin Tucci, TV, film, and stage actress, Nunsense, Showgirls, Anita in Orange is the New Black
- Marcia Marcia Marcia, contestant on Rupaul's Drag Race; performed in Kinky Boots, Cabaret, and the national tour of Hello, Dolly!
- Stephanie Umoh, Broadway actress (Sarah in 2009 revival of Ragtime)
- Adina Verson, actor
- Matt Walton, actor
- Eleri Ward, singer-songwriter and actress

=== Dance Division ===
- Andrea Herbert Major, dancer and choreographer
- Rukmini Vijayakumar, dancer, actor, and choreographer

== Notable current faculty ==
- Kenneth Amis, tuba
- Lynn Chang, violin
- Pamela Dellal, voice
- Michael Lewin, piano
- Janice Weber, pianist
- Nancy Zeltsman, marimba

== Boston Conservatory leadership ==
- Roger H. Brown, president, Berklee (2004–2021)
- Julius Eichberg, president, Boston Conservatory (1867–1893)
- Ester Ferrabini, president, Boston Conservatory (1932–1933)
- Agide Jacchia, president, Boston Conservatory (1920–1932)
- Jim Lucchese, president, Berklee (2025–present)
- Erica Muhl, president, Berklee (2021–2023)
- Richard Ortner, president, Boston Conservatory (1998–2017)
