= Century Opera Company =

The Century Opera Company was a New York City opera company.

== History ==
It was incorporated on May 9, 1913. It was funded with a capital stock of $300,000. Edward Kellogg Baird, was president. Otto Hermann Kahn was vice-president, and Alvin W. Krech was the treasurer.

In 1914, with Agide Jacchia conducting, the company premiered Guido Ferranti by Jane Van Etten, one of the first American operas by a female composer to be produced by a regular opera company.
