= Edward Kellogg Baird =

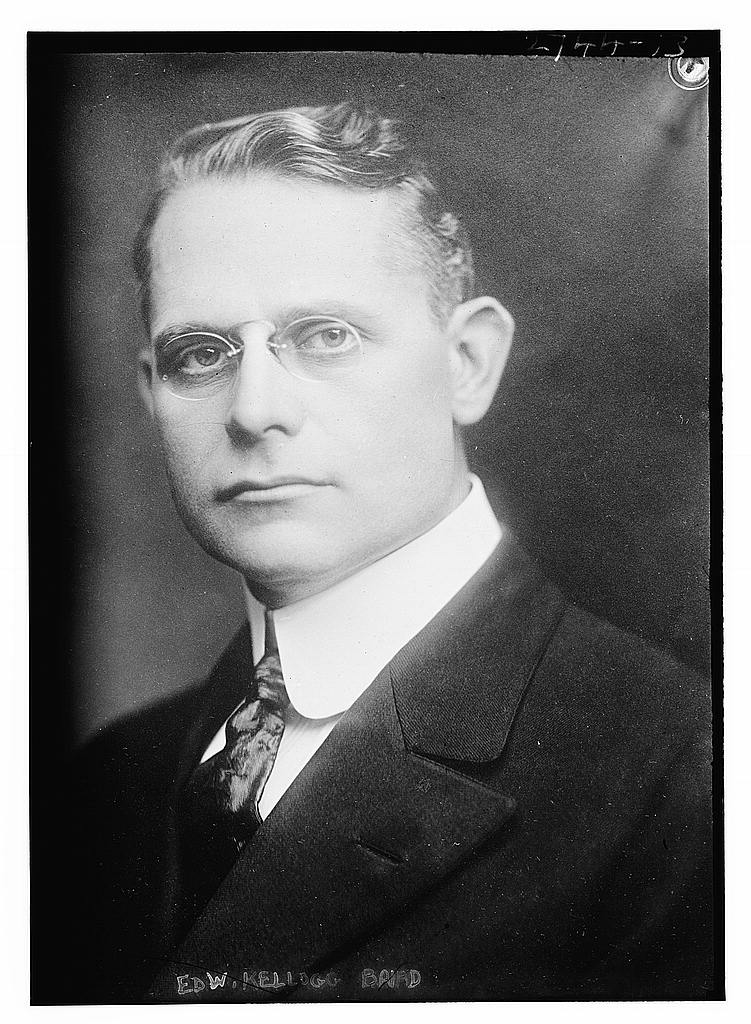

Edward Kellogg Baird (July 13, 1876 - 1951), was an attorney and the president of the Century Opera Company.

== Biography ==
He was born on July 13, 1876. In 1913 he became president of the Century Opera Company but resigned the same year over debts he accumulated for publications associated with the opera company. He died in 1951.
