= Agide Jacchia =

Italian music conductor (1875–1932)

Agide Jacchia (5 January 1875 – 29 November 1932) was an Italian orchestral director.

== Early life and education ==
Born in Lugo di Romagna, Jacchia studied at the Conservatory of Parma from 1886 to 1891 and at the Liceo Musicale Rossini in Pesaro from 1891 to 1898. He won prizes for flute (1896), conducting (1897), and composition (1898).

== Career ==
Jacchia debuted as conductor at the Teatro Grande in Brescia on 26 December 1898. Later he conducted at T. Communale, Ferrara (1899–1900) and La Fenice, Venice (1901). In 1902 he accompanied Pietro Mascagni on his American tour. On his return to Italy he conducted at the Teatro Lirico in Milan (1903), at the Teatro Regio, Livorno (1904), and at Siena (1905–06). From 1907 to 1909 he was conductor of the Milan Opera Company on its tour in the United States. From 1910 to 1913, he was conductor of the Montreal Opera Company, and in 1914 of the Century Opera Company, in which capacity he led the premiere of Jane Van Etten's Guido Ferranti in 1914. Later he would go on to conduct the Boston Pops. Jacchia was president of the Boston Conservatory from 1920 until his death in 1932.

Agide Jacchia was married to Italian opera singer Ester Ferrabini, from 1911 until he died in 1932. They had a daughter, Elsa.
