= The Duchess of Padua =

Play by Oscar Wilde

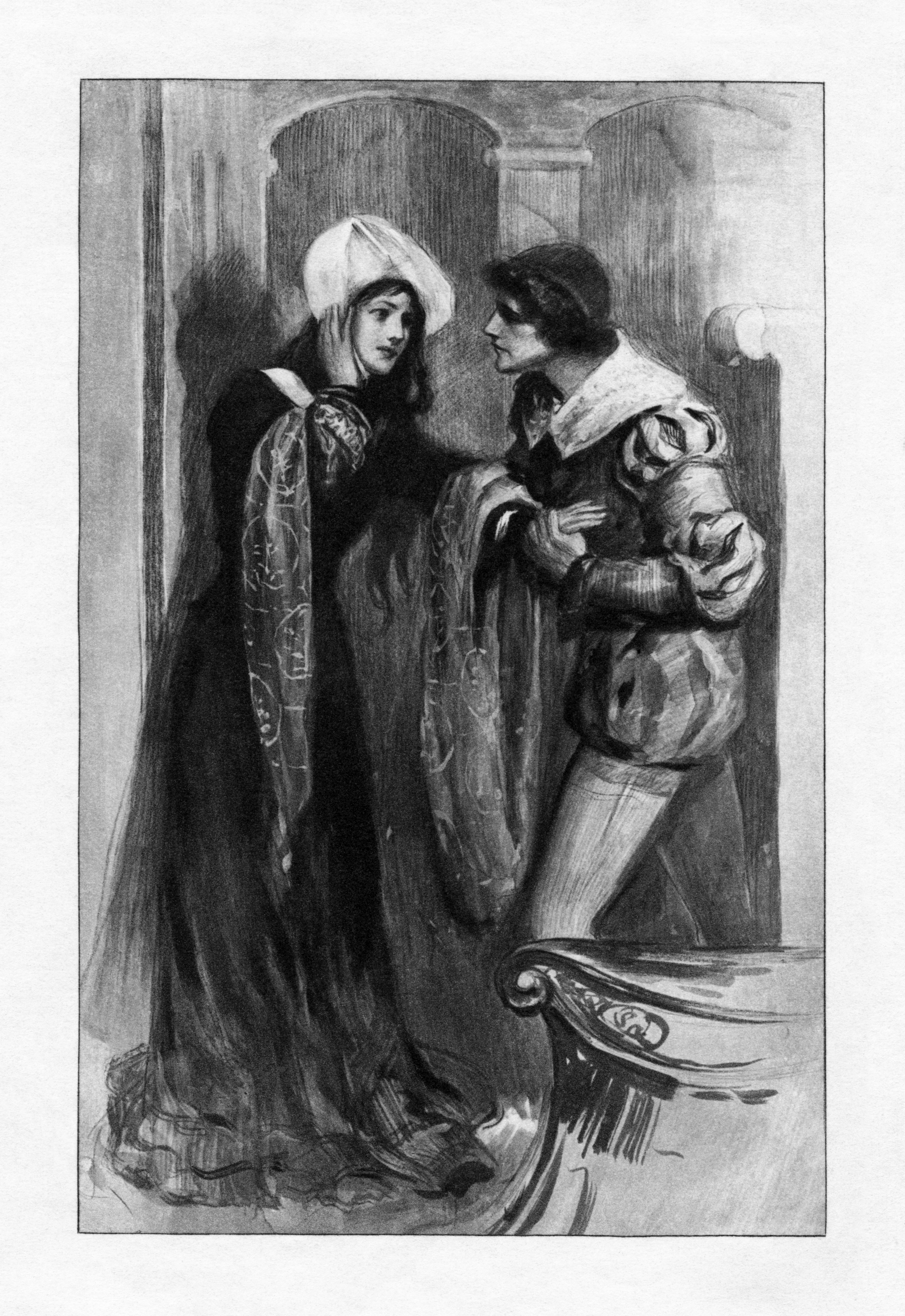
- "Alackaday! I am fallen so low in place. I can reward thee only with niggardly thanks."
- Original language: English
- Written by: Oscar Wilde
- Genre: Tragedy
- Setting: Padua, Italy

Premiere
- Date: January 26th, 1891
- Place: The Broadway Theatre, New York City, United States

The Duchess of Padua is a five-act tragedy by Oscar Wilde, set in Padua and written in blank verse. It was written for the actress Mary Anderson in early 1883 while Wilde was in Paris. After she turned it down, it was abandoned until its first performance at the Broadway Theatre in New York City under the title Guido Ferranti on 26 January 1891, where it ran for three weeks. It has been rarely revived or studied.

== Production history ==
Wilde first mentioned the possibility of writing a five-act blank verse tragedy in the Biograph in 1880, originally to be entitled The Duchess of Florence. Wilde was strongly influenced by Lucrezia Borgia (1833) and Angelo, Tyrant of Padua (1835), two Italian-set historical plays by Victor Hugo.

Wilde originally wanted Mary Anderson for the title role:

"I cannot write the scenario until I see you and talk to you. All good plays are a combination of the dream of a poet and that practical knowledge of the actor which gives concentration to the action...I want you to rank with the great actresses of the earth...having in you a faith which is as flawless as it is fervent I doubt not for a moment that I can and will write for you a play which, created for you and inspired by you, shall give you the glory of a Rachel, and may yield me the fame of a Hugo."

He had difficulty, however, negotiating with her business manager and stepfather, Hamilton Griffin, whom Wilde referred to privately as "The Griffin" and "a padded horror". On 23 September 1882, all three met in Boston and agreed to open on 22 January 1883. In October, Wilde learnt they had decided to wait until September. Finally, a contract was signed in December - Wilde received £1,000 upfront, and £4,000 if the completed play was accepted by Anderson in March 1883, which she would then produce.

Wilde finished the play at the Hotel Voltaire in Paris by 15 March 1883, 14 days after Griffin's deadline. However, Anderson proved hard to communicate with, and provided a definite refusal in April.

The play was unexpectedly rediscovered by American actor Lawrence Barrett in 1889, who contacted Wilde about producing it. Wilde agreed to meet him in July to discuss the play, writing he was "very glad to make any alterations in it you can suggest". Among these changes Barrett suggested was the new title Guido Ferranti, named after the lead hero rather than heroine, under which he claimed it would have greater success. He also requested that Wilde's name not be attached to the play after the failure of Vera; or, The Nihilists, although this did not deceive the New York Tribune who correctly identified the author in their review, after which it was advertised as "Oscar Wilde's Love Tragedy". The play was first produced in January 1891 in New York, with Barrett in the role of Ferranti and Minna K. Gale as the Duchess of Padua. It ran for twenty-one performances over three weeks until stopped by Barrett.

Wilde sought to produce a second run of the play in London, but was refused by both Henry Irving and George Alexander. It was not produced in England until 1907, for copyright purposes; after which it was not performed there again until 2010. It was also performed twice in Germany, in 1904 and 1906.

== Plot synopsis ==
The Duchess of Padua tells the story of a young man named Guido who was left as a baby in the charge of a man he calls his uncle. Guido gets a notice to meet a man in Padua in regards to something concerning his parentage. When he arrives in Padua, he is convinced by a man named Moranzone to abandon his only friend, Ascanio, in order to dedicate himself to revenging his father’s death at the hands of Simone Gesso, the Duke of Padua. In the course of the play, Guido finds he has fallen in love with Beatrice, the title character, and confides his love to her, a love which she returns. By this time, Guido has had a change of heart and decides not to kill the Duke of Padua, and instead intends to leave his father’s dagger at the Duke’s bedside to let the Duke know that his life could have been taken if Guido had wanted to kill him.

On the way to the bedchamber, however, Guido is met by Beatrice, who has herself stabbed and killed the Duke so that she might be with Guido. Guido is appalled at the sin committed on his behalf and rejects Beatrice, claiming that their love has been soiled. She runs from him and when she comes across some guards she claims that Guido killed the Duke. He is brought to trial the next day. Beatrice tries to prevent Guido from speaking on his own behalf for fear that she might be exposed as the killer, but Guido admits to the killing to protect her, and so the date for his execution is set. Beatrice goes to visit Guido in his cell and tells him that she has confessed to the murder but that the magistrates did not believe her and would not allow her to pardon Guido. Before waking Guido, Beatrice drinks some poison and when Guido discovers that the poison is all but gone, he shares a kiss with Beatrice before she dies, at which time Guido takes her knife and kills himself.

=== Dramatis Personae ===
- Simone Gesso, Duke of Padua
- Beatrice, his Wife
- Andrea Pollajuolo, Cardinal of Padua
- Maffio Petrucci, Gentleman of the Duke's Household
- Jeppo Vitellozzo, Gentleman of the Duke's Household
- Taddeo Bardi, Gentleman of the Duke's Household
- Guido Ferranti
- Ascanio Cristofano, his Friend
- Count Moranzone, an Old Noble
- Bernardo Calvacanti, Lord Justice of Padua
- Ugo, the Headsman
- Lucia, a Tire Woman
- Servants, Citizens, Soldiers, Monks and Falconers with hawks and dogs

=== Act I ===
Guido Ferranti, a young man, travels to Padua with his friend Ascanio after receiving a mysterious letter from a stranger, claiming to know the true secret of Guido's birth. Guido meets him in the market, as the letter instructs, and after Ascanio leaves, he reveals himself as Count Moranzone. He tells Guido that his father was the Duke Lorenzo, who had been executed after being betrayed by a close friend in exchange for land, that his mother died in a swoon on hearing the news, and it was he who had taken the young Guido to the family he had grown up with. He encourages Guido in his revenge, and telling him that betraying the Duke is better than merely killing him, and shows him his father's knife. Before Moranzone can tell Guido the traitor's name, the Duke of Padua enters with his court, and Moranzone indicates the Duke's guilt by kneeling before him. He introduces Guido as one who wants service in the Duke's household. The Duke accepts him, then continues to the Cathedral. Moranzone tells Guido that until he is avenged, he should put aside all other things - when Ascanio returns, Guido sends him away. As Guido speaks a soliloquy, swearing this, he sees the Duchess of Padua pass. Their eyes meet.

=== Act II ===
Guido has risen in the Duke's confidence sufficiently that he rests on his arm. A mob outside the palace calls for the Duke's death, and when he orders them fired upon, the Duchess stands between them. She intercedes for them with the Duke, and when he will not listen to their grievances, divides her whole purse between them. The Duke expresses his displeasure, but does not notice the mutual attraction between her and Guido. The court leaves - the Duchess alone wonders how Guido can dote on the Duke as he does. Guido returns alone as she prays and declares his love for her, which she eagerly returns. Their kiss is interrupted by a servant, who delivers to Guido his father's dagger - the sign from Moranzone that he should now kill the Duke. Guido tells the Duchess that they must part forever, and leaves for his revenge.

=== Act III ===
Guido meets Moranzone on the way to the Duke - he explains that he has decided not to kill the Duke. Instead he intends to leave the dagger with a letter, so the Duke will know Guido had him in his power and chose to spare him. Moranzone calls him a coward and bad son, and blames his contact with the Duchess for his change of heart. While Guido prays alone that he has done the right thing, the Duchess enters, and tells him there is nothing separating them any more - because she has killed the Duke. Guido rejects her in horror, and they argue. He repents of his reaction as she leaves, and the act drops on her leading the guard to arrest Guido.

=== Act IV ===
During the trial, Guido declares that he will tell the truth before the verdict falls upon him. Fearing that Guido will identify her as the real murderer, the Duchess orders the judges not to allow him to speak. However, the judges finally grant Guido the right to defend himself, at which time he claims that he is the murderer. The duchess faints in shame, shock and gratefulness.

=== Act V ===
The Duchess masks herself in a cloak to visit Guido in jail. She plans to substitute herself for him at the execution on the next day. Determined to die, she drank the poison that was put next to the sleeping Guido. Guido wakes up and admits that he has forgiven the Duchess and that he loves her. The Duchess urges Guido to flee but he refuses. Guido finally kills himself with the Duchess's dagger after she dies in his arms.

== Critical reception ==
Wilde himself described the play to Anderson: "I have no hesitation in saying that it is the masterpiece of all my literary work, the chef d'oeuvre of my youth." Mary Anderson, however, was less enthusiastic: "The play in its present form, I fear, would no more please the public of today than would 'Venus Preserved' or 'Lucretia Borgia'. Neither of us can afford failure now, and your Duchess in my hands would not succeed, as the part does not fit me. My admiration of your ability is as great as ever."

William Winter reviewed the first production in The New York Tribune on 27 January 1891:

"The new play is deftly constructed in five short acts, and is written in a strain of blank verse that is always melodious, often eloquent, and sometimes freighted with fanciful figures of rare beauty. It is less a tragedy, however, than a melodrama...the radical defect of the work is insincerity. No one in it is natural."

The Duchess of Padua is not regarded as one of Wilde's major works, and has rarely been performed or discussed. Leonée Ormond suggests several reasons for this: it is "quite unlike the plays for which Wilde is most famous, and biographers and critics have been inclined to say that it is unstageable, that it draws too heavily upon Shakespeare, Jacobean tragedy and Shelley’s The Cenci."

Robert Shore commented on the play itself while reviewing a rare contemporary production:

"...his tale of Renaissance realpolitik, revenge and big love is about as far removed from the sophisticated social ironies of The Importance of Being Earnest as you can get. The dramatist affects the high Jacobean manner but the results are more cold pastiche than hot homage. Shakespearean archetypes stand behind the action - especially Lady Macbeth and Romeo and Juliet - but the smoothness of the verse means Wilde's characters never burn with the knotty tormented passion of their dramatic forebears. Basically, it's Victorian melodrama."

However, Joseph Pearce is more receptive to Wilde's Shakespearian influence: "Unfortunately, the derivativeness of The Duchess of Padua has devalued it in the eyes of the critics...Yet if The Duchess of Padua is an imitation of Shakespeare, it is a very good imitation." He emphasises the presence of Wilde's own paradoxical style in lines such as "She is worse than ugly, she is good", and views it as sharing major themes and language with the rest of Wilde's canon.

== Adaptations ==
The Duchess of Padua was the basis of a one-act opera by Jane Van Etten, titled Guido Ferranti, which premiered in Chicago in 1914 and was one of the first American operas by a woman to be produced by a regular company.

The work has been adapted into a chamber opera for four voices and piano duet by Edward Lambert (2019).
