= Lucrezia Borgia (play) =

1833 play by Victor Hugo

Lucrezia Borgia (French: Lucrèce Borgia) is an 1833 play by the French writer Victor Hugo. It is a historical work portraying the Renaissance-era Italian aristocrat Lucrezia Borgia. The play (along with Angelo, Tyrant of Padua) is believed to have been a major influence on Oscar Wilde's The Duchess of Padua (1891).

== Adaptations ==
The opera Lucrezia Borgia composed by Gaetano Donizetti had a libretto by Felice Romani which was based on Hugo's play. Several films about Borgia and her family have drawn partly on the plot of the play.

== Bibliography ==
- Kohl, Norbert. Oscar Wilde: The Works of a Conformist Rebel. Cambridge University Press, 2011
