= Her Majesty's Theatre, Montreal =

Coordinates: 45.4955°N 73.5782°W

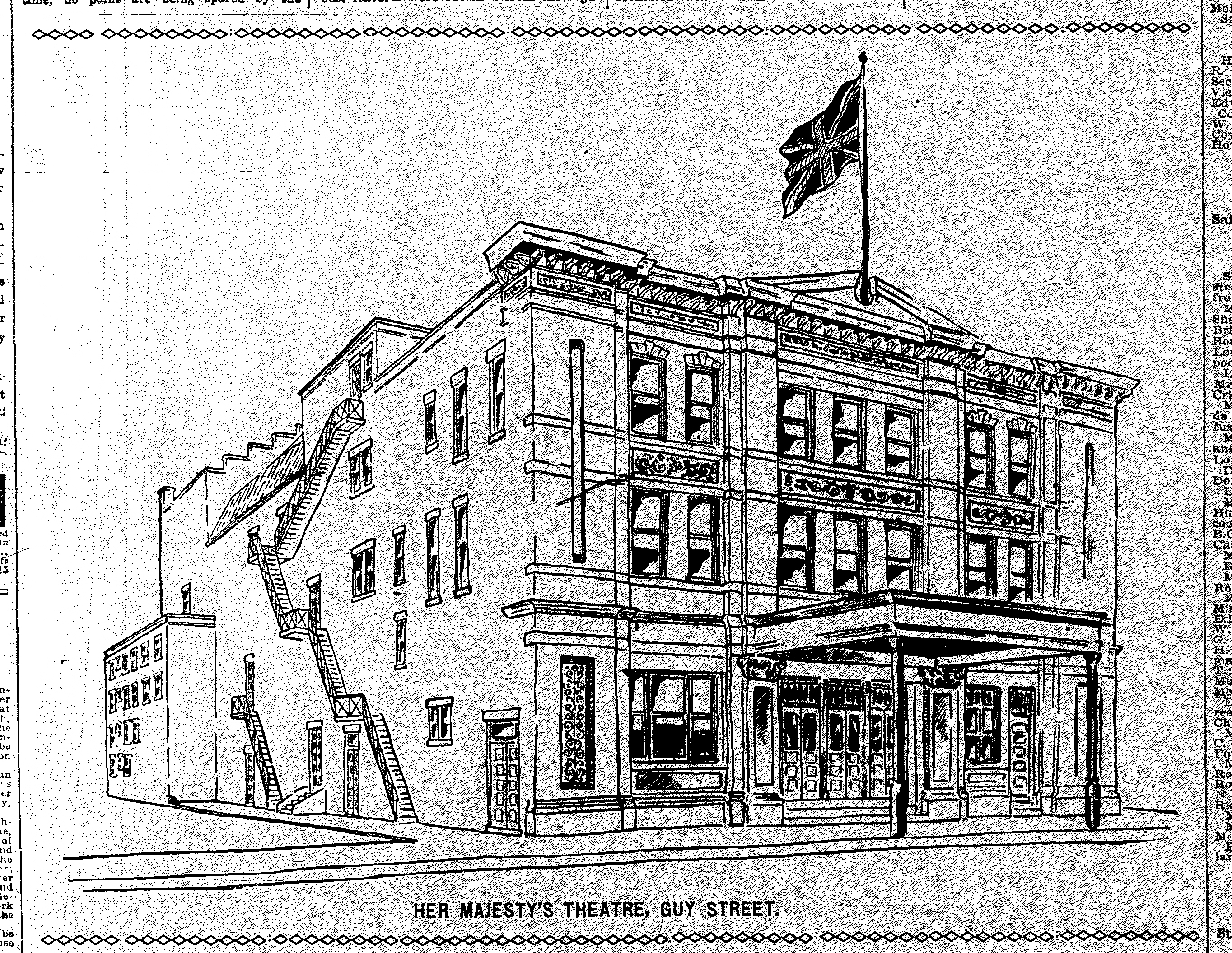
Her Majesty's Theatre, Guy Street, Montreal, 1898

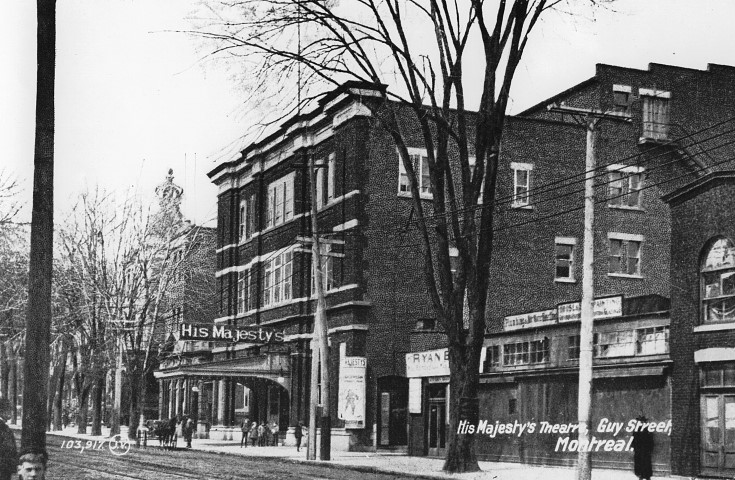
His Majesty's Theatre, circa 1910.

Her Majesty's Theatre (also known as His Majesty's Theatre) was a theatre located on Guy Street in Montreal, Quebec, Canada. For nearly 65 years it was one of the most important venues for orchestral concerts, recitals, plays, operas, and ballets in that city.

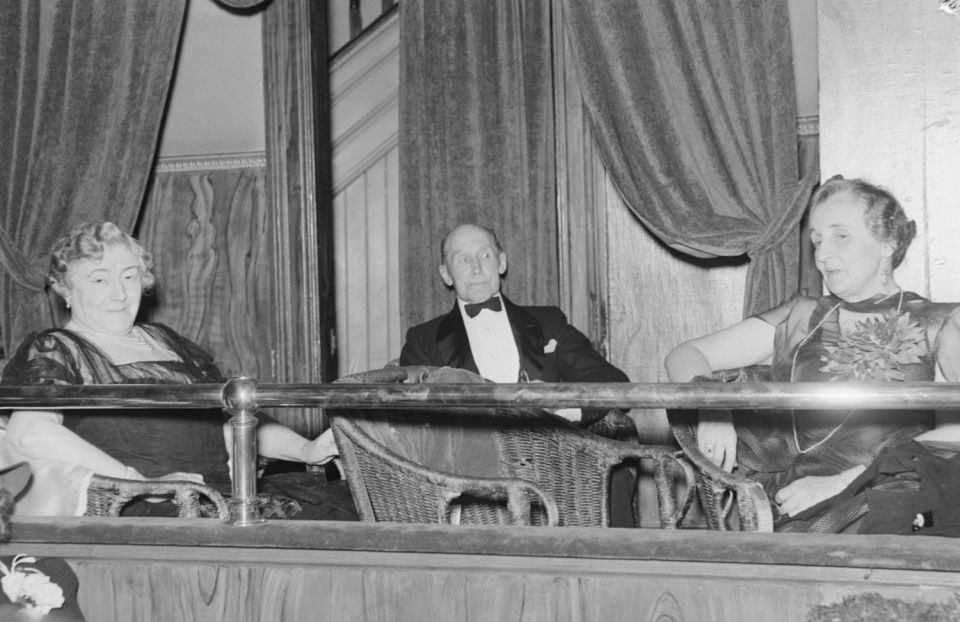
Spectators at a premiere, His Majesty's Theatre, 1940.

Built in 1897–1898 during the reign of Queen Victoria, the theatre was in continual operation until it was demolished in 1963. As the name of the theatre changed with the sex of the monarch of Canada, the theatre was known as His Majesty's Theatre from 1901 to 1952, and then reverted to the title of Her Majesty's Theatre upon the accession of Elizabeth II in 1952.

It was the home of the Montreal Opera Company (1910–1913), the National Opera Company of Canada (1914), the Montreal Orchestra (1930–1941), and the Opera Guild of Montreal (1942–1963). The theatre was the main venue for the Montreal Festivals from 1940 to 1946.

== See also ==
- Royal eponyms in Canada
