= Gatsby: An American Myth =

Musical by Florence Welch, Thomas Bartlett, and Martyna Majok

Gatsby
- An American Myth
- Official show art
- Music: Florence Welch; Thomas Bartlett
- Lyrics: Florence Welch
- Book: Martyna Majok
- Basis: The Great Gatsby by F. Scott Fitzgerald
- Premiere: June 5, 2024: American Repertory Theater, Cambridge, Massachusetts
- Productions: 2024 Cambridge

Gatsby: An American Myth is a stage musical with music by Florence Welch and Thomas Bartlett, lyrics by Welch, and a book by Martyna Majok, based on the 1925 novel The Great Gatsby by F. Scott Fitzgerald.

When the project was first announced in 2021, the initial press release quoted Welch, best known as lead singer for Florence + the Machine, as saying, "This book has haunted me for a large part of my life. It contains some of my favourite lines in literature. Musicals were my first love, and I feel a deep connection to Fitzgerald’s broken romanticism."

== Synopsis ==
=== Act I ===
Nick Carraway, a young man from Minnesota traumatized from his time in World War I, arrives in the industrializing New York City as its working-class inhabitants sing of the labor that has gone into its development ("Welcome to the New World"). Nick meets the old-money Buchanans – his cousin Daisy and her husband Tom – and their friend, amateur golfer Jordan Baker. During the interaction Jordan mentions Nick's wealthy neighbor Gatsby, shocking Daisy. Tom takes a call from his mistress Myrtle Wilson to Daisy's indignation; she sings about her unhappiness beneath her perfect facade ("Golden Girl"). Myrtle's husband George runs an unsuccessful garage in the Valley of Ashes; the death of their child to Spanish flu years prior has driven a wedge in their relationship ("Valley of Ashes"). Tom takes Myrtle to an iniquitous party in Manhattan where Myrtle feels alive, but she angers Tom by mentioning Daisy ("Shakin Off The Dust"). At the party, Nick sleeps with the photographer Mr. McKee, and afterwards wonders at the possibilities of the city; Daisy and Myrtle also contemplate their lots in life ("New York Symphony").

Nick receives an invitation to one of Gatsby's parties. Jordan is in attendance and enjoys the throng of people ("One Heart Beat"). Nick befriends the mysterious Gatsby ("Deathless Song"). Gatsby takes Nick to lunch, where Gatsby's business associate Meyer Wolfsheim tells Nick of Gatsby's rags-to-riches story ("Feels Like Hell"). Gatsby reveals that he would like to be reacquainted with Nick's cousin Daisy. Nick informs Jordan of this, admitting he is charmed by Gatsby ("A Smile Like That Is Rare"). In turn, Jordan tells Nick of Gatsby and Daisy's passionate affair while the former was stationed at Camp Taylor ("Month of Love"). Daisy did not hear from Gatsby after the latter's deployment and eventually became engaged to Tom. She received a letter from Gatsby on the morning of her wedding and attempted to call it off, but was convinced to marry Tom ("I've Changed My Mind"). Nick reintroduces Gatsby and Daisy at tea ("Pouring Down"). Despite the initial awkwardness, the two manage to reconnect after Gatsby brings Daisy and Nick to his mansion. An exhilarated Gatsby privately declares his intent to not be forgotten, and to be a man worthy of Daisy ("Mr. Nobody from Nowhere").

=== Act II ===
Gatsby invites Tom, Daisy, Nick and Jordan to another of his lavish parties ("Just A Little Party"). Tom is taken aback by the extravagance and confused at how Daisy and Gatsby know each other. Myrtle is also working the party and rekindles her affair with Tom. Daisy is also considering the possibility of leaving Tom for Gatsby ("Welcome to the New World (Reprise)"). After the party, Myrtle is frustrated by Tom's actions but intends to hold her own ("Driving My Way"). Daisy and Gatsby continue seeing each other, as do Tom and Myrtle ("What Is This Worship").

Gatsby pressures Daisy to reveal their relationship to Tom and divorce him. On a particularly hot day, tensions run high among Tom, Daisy, Gatsby, Nick and Jordan, and they reluctantly agree to go to a hotel suite ("What Will We Do With Ourselves?"). Meanwhile, George discovers Myrtle's affair and begs her to remain with him. Myrtle tries to flee but George locks her in the house ("What Of Love, What Of God"). Tom reveals that Gatsby is a bootlegger and a criminal, to Daisy's horror; though she readily admits that she no longer loves Tom, Gatsby demands that she say she never loved him. Daisy realizes that Gatsby's romanticization of her is akin to her family and Tom's treatment, and asserts her agency by demanding to drive Gatsby's signature Rolls-Royce back home ("The Dream Fought On"). Myrtle manages to escape the house and runs into the street, but is hit by the car and killed; eyewitnesses identify the Rolls-Royce. Tom is distraught by Myrtle's death and tells George Gatsby is the owner of the car. Nick is appalled at Jordan's blasé attitude towards the accident and disavows her company.

At home, Daisy and Tom argue about the incident. Daisy angrily says that she knowingly ran Myrtle over to spite Tom; Tom assures her that they could stay married and maintain their good name, though this would mean Daisy is no different from him ("The Damage That You Do"). Nick tries to convince Gatsby to flee the country, but Gatsby steadfastedly waits for Daisy ("Vigil"). Gatsby and George separately lament how American society has molded them ("America, She Breaks"). George shoots Gatsby dead before committing suicide.

Later, the only attendees at Gatsby's funeral are Nick, a drunken party guest, and Gatsby's father, a Native American man who remains proud of his son despite their estrangement ("Pouring Down (Reprise)"). Wolfsheim tells Nick that he mourned Gatsby but could not afford to remain associated with him. Lamenting their situation and resolving to do better in the future, Nick departs New York City, but not before visiting Gatsby's abandoned mansion one more time ("We Beat On").

== Production history ==
=== Cambridge (2024) ===
The musical had its world premiere at the American Repertory Theater in Cambridge, Massachusetts, in previews beginning May 23, 2024, leading to opening night on June 5, 2024, and closed on August 3, 2024. It was directed by Tony Award-winner Rachel Chavkin and choreographed by Sonya Tayeh. Announced cast includes Isaac Powell (Gatsby), Charlotte MacInnes (Daisy), Ben Levi Ross (Nick), Cory Jeacoma (Tom), Eleri Ward (Jordan), Solea Pfeiffer (Myrtle), Matthew Amira (Wilson), and Adam Grupper (Wolfsheim).

=== London ===
On July 31st 2025, it was announced that a reading of the show was due to take place in London with David Cromer taking Chavkin’s place as director and Carmen Pavlovic, one of the owners of theatre company Global Creatures, joining the show as a producer.

== Cast and characters ==
Character	American Repertory Theater
Character	2024
Nick Carraway	Ben Levi Ross
Jay Gatsby	Isaac Cole Powell
Daisy Buchanan	Charlotte MacInnes
Tom Buchanan	Cory Jeacoma
Myrtle Wilson	Solea Pfeiffer
Jordan Baker	Eleri Ward
George Wilson	Matthew Amira
Meyer Wolfsheim	Adam Grupper

== Musical Numbers ==
Act I

- "Welcome to The New World"
- "Golden Girl"
- "Valley of Ashes"
- "Shakin Off The Dust"
- "New York Symphony"
- "One Heart Beat"
- "Deathless Song"
- "Feels Like Hell"
- "A Smile Like That Is Rare"
- "Month of Love"
- "I've Changed My Mind"
- "Pouring Down"
- "Mr. Nobody from Nowhere"

Act II

- "Just a Little Party"
- "Welcome to The New World (Reprise)"
- "Driving My Way"
- "What Is This Worship"
- "What Will We Do With Ourselves?"
- "What of Love, What of God"
- "The Dream Fought On"
- "The Damage That You Do"
- "Vigil"
- "America, She Breaks"
- "Pouring Down (Reprise)"
- "We Beat On"
