= Montreal Opera Company =

The Montreal Opera Company (MOC), known in the French-language as the Compagnie d'opéra de Montréal, was a Canadian opera company active at Her Majesty's Theatre, Montreal from 1910 to 1913. It was the first "homegrown opera company" in the city of Montreal with previous opera troupes active in the city coming from outside the region. It was founded by Albert Clerk-Jeannotte in 1910. The MOC was supported with the financial backing of Frank Stephen Meighen. The company presented three seasons of opera productions; giving close to 300 performances during that period.

The MOC's principal conductor was Agide Jacchia. Some of the singers who performed with the MOC included sopranos Maria Gay, Béatrice La Palme, Carmen Melis, and Irene Pavloska; tenors Edmond Clément, Giuseppe Gaudenzi, and Léon Laffite; baritone Jean Riddez; and bass Giovanni Polese. Operas in the MOC's repertory were from the French and Italian repertoire. Some of the French operas staged by the company included Bizet's Carmen, Delibes's Lakmé, Messager's Madame Chrysanthème, and Massenet's Cendrillon, Le jongleur de Notre-Dame, Manon, La Navarraise, Thaïs, and Werther. The Italian repertory included multiple operas by Puccini (La Bohème, Madama Butterfly, & Tosca), Giordano's Fedora, Mascagni's L'amico Fritz, and Verdi's La traviata.

Financial problems led to the MOC's closure in 1913. After the company disbanded at the end of the 1912-1913 season, many of its former members came together to establish the National Opera Company of Canada. This company survived for only one additional season.
