= Edward Lambert =

English composer

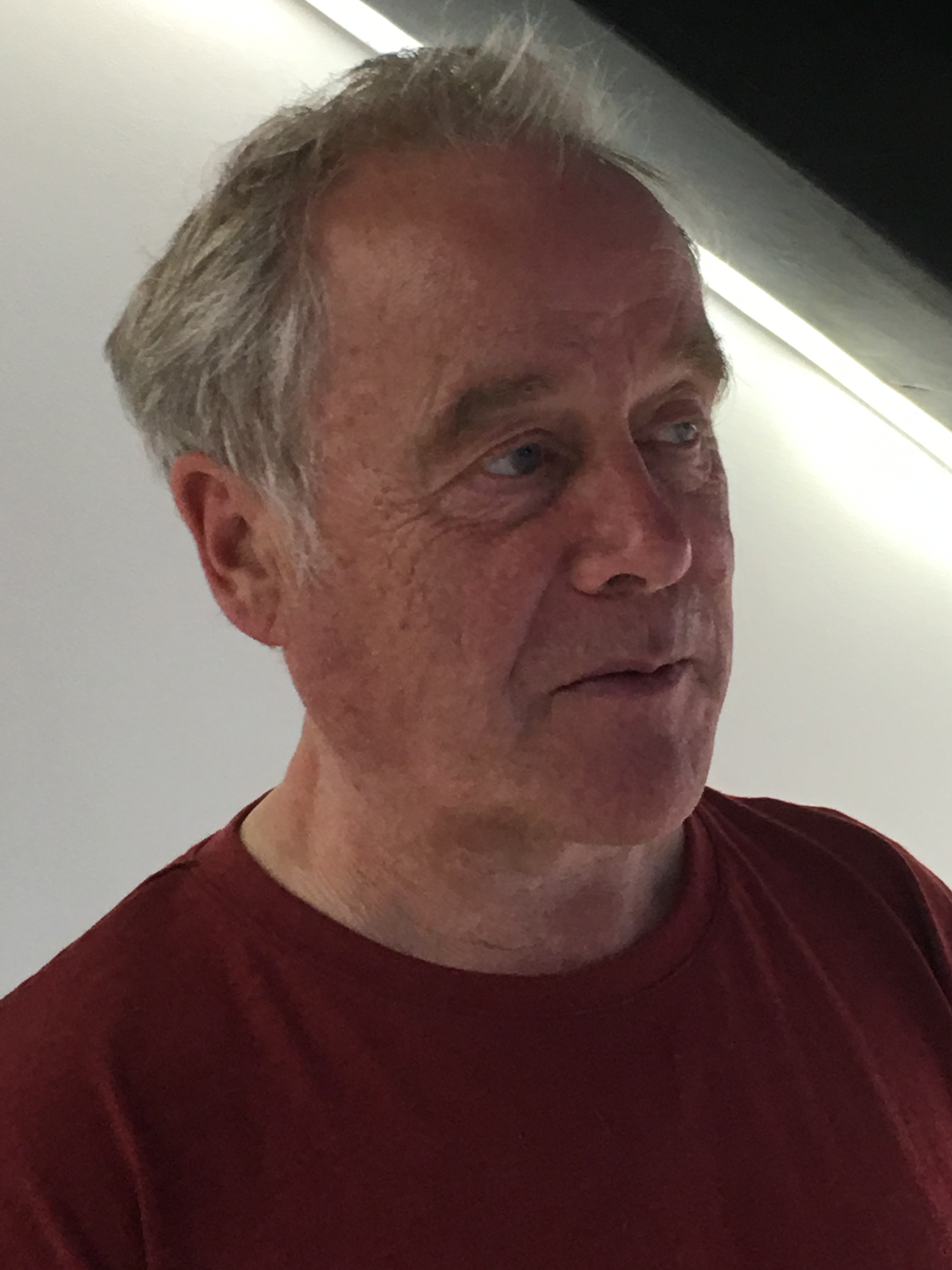
- Born: 1951 (age 74–75)
- Era: 20th century

Edward Lambert (born 1951) is an English composer who has written chamber music, vocal and choral works, and chamber operas. He is also a conductor and pianist.

== Study ==
Edward Lambert was educated at Christ's Hospital and read music at Merton College, Oxford (1970–1973) where he was the college's Choirmaster and conductor of the Kodály Choir. Lambert then trained as an opera repetiteur at the London Opera Centre (1973–74) while studying piano with Paul Hamburger. He went on to study composition under John Lambert (no relation) at the Royal College of Music (1976–1977).

== Career ==
Lambert spent two seasons (1974–1976) working as repetiteur and assistant kapellmeister at the Schleswig-Holsteinisches Landestheater in the North German town of Flensburg. There he came into contact with the new music of the 1960s and 1970s. In 1976 he attended Darmstadt composers' course when György Ligeti was lecturing there: Epitaph was selected for performance. The Park Lane Players gave performances of the Fantasy Trio (1977) and the Canzonetta (Sonatina) for Clarinet & Piano. As a result of attending the Gulbenkian course for composers and choreographers in 1977, led by Robert Cohan, he wrote Ephialtes (1978) for Scottish Ballet, Invention (1978) and Maxims, Hymn, Riddle (1982) for Jonathan Burrows and the Spiral Dance Company. While serving his apprenticeship in Germany, he also worked at the Wexford Festival Ireland (1974–1976); in 1977 he joined the music staff of the Royal Opera House Covent Garden, (full-time 1977–1982, continuing freelance until 1996).

His Piano Quartet Emplay was the winner of the Humphrey Searle Chamber Music Competition and played twice in the finals at the Purcell Room in 1983. The Chamber Concerto (1983) was performed by Lontano at the 1984 Bath International Music Festival. The Mass for Four Voices was performed at the Huddersfield Contemporary Music Festival and broadcast on BBC Radio 3. In the 1980s and 1990s Lambert was involved in the Royal Opera's developing outreach program around the country which explored innovative ways of composing operas alongside children and amateurs (often in collaboration with the education arm of the Metropolitan Opera, New York): this resulted in several opera projects including The Treasure and a Tale, (a fusion of Beowulf and the Sutton Hoo discovery in collaboration with the British Museum) performed at the Snape Maltings and The Button Moulder (1989–90), a specially commissioned work for teenagers adapted by Lambert from Ibsen's Peer Gynt. This production travelled to the US. The chamber opera Caedmon based on a play by Christopher Fry was produced by the Royal Opera at the Donmar Warehouse in May 1989 with Christopher Gillett in the title role. All in the Mind (2004) was commissioned by W11 Opera, also to Lambert's own libretto, and performed at the Britten Theatre in London. Several works have been performed in the Newbury area in Berkshire, England, where he now lives. He was musical director of the Newbury Chamber Choir (2002-2020) and in 2013 formed a group called The Music Troupe which performed regularly from 2014 to 2025 at the annual Tête à Tête Opera Festival in London.

In 2014 The Music Troupe mounted productions of Six Characters in Search of a Stage, The Inarticulate Burr, Stillleben (Sonata for Strings as dance), and The Catfish Conundrum. There followed Opera With a Title, The Cloak and Dagger Affair and The Parting (after Lorca), The Oval Portrait (after Poe), The Art of Venus (2017) and Apollo's Mission (2019).

The Burning Question (2022) was hailed by Planet Hugill as " ... a complex, layered story about love, loss, self sacrifice and sin... an absolute delight from start to finish."Maunders, Florence (5 September 2022). "Planet Hugill".

The journal of the UK Oscar Wilde Society, ″The Wildean″(July 2024), wrote of Lambert's adaptation of Oscar Wilde's "The Duchess of Padua" that the work "injects vitality into this overlooked piece, presenting a captivating exploration of love and vengeance through vibrant music. His faithful adaptation skilfully navigates between the melodramatic and sentimental elements of the plot, revealing its unexpected contemporaneity..."

== Works ==
- Erwachen (German opera after Erwachen by August Stramm)
- Piano Sonata - Arrangement in Black and White
- Twelfth Night (opera after Shakespeare)
- The Rapture (chamber opera)
- At the Hawk's Well (W.B.Yeats)
- The Burning Question (chamber opera)
- Swellfellow the Tyrant (Shelley, Oedipus Tyrannus)
- The Last Siren (chamber opera)
- Masque of Vengeance (Middleton, 1607)
- Last Party on Earth (chamber opera)
- The Duchess of Padua (Oscar Wilde)
- Apollo's Mission (chamber opera)
- In Five Years' Time (Lorca)
- Buster's Trip (Lorca)
- The Butterfly's Spell (Lorca)
- The Parting (Lorca)
- The Art of Venus (chamber opera)
- The Cloak and Dagger Affair (Lorca)
- Yin and Yang Cantata
- The Visit to the Sepulchre (Visitatio sepulchri)
- Opera with a Title (Lorca)
- An Opera of Daniel (medieval)
- Aspects of 'Work' (piano duo)
- The Catfish Conundrum (chamber opera)
- The Inarticulate Burr (Edward Dowden)
- Shelley's Hymm (Shelley, Hymn to Intellectual Beauty)
- The Oval Portrait (Poe)
- Four Ideas for 2 oboes
- Six Characters in Search of a Stage (Pirandello)
- The First Christmas Tree
- Funeral Sentences
- Sonata for Strings
- Short Story
- More or less? for oboe & piano
- Laugh Out Loud for clarinet & piano
- Brighter Than The Sun (Christmas Cantata) Mystery play
- Rossetti Requiem Christina Rossetti
- Music for 4 Bassoons
- Songs for a Florentine Apollo
- Speed Matters for violin & harp
- Trio Sonata in D
- The Crucifixion
- Concerto Cubico
- du barocque...
- All in the Mind (opera)
- The Dream That Hath No Bottom (opera after A Midsummer Night's Dream)
- Te Deum
- Symphony of Joys and of Sorrows
- String Quartet no 3
- String Quartet no 2
- Praise the Lord
- Meditation on a Ruin Old English literature
- Magnificat & Nunc Dimittis
- Opening Chapters
- The Treasure and a Tale (opera after Beowulf & Sutton Hoo)
- Ten Riddles
- The Button Moulder (opera after Peer Gynt)
- Caedmon (opera Christopher Fry)
- Chamber Concerto
- Mass for Four Voices
- Piano Quartet 'Emplay'
- Invention for violin & piano
- Fantasy Trio
- Maxims, Hymn, Riddle (Old English)
- 3 Pieces for lute
- Canzonetta for clarinet & piano
- Pange Lingua
- String Quartet no 1
