= Jane Van Etten =

American composer and singer (1869–1950)

Jane Van Etten (1869 – April 17, 1950), also known by her married name, Jane Van Etten Andrews, was an American composer and singer. She was one of the first female composers in the United States to have an opera produced by a regular opera company.

== Biography ==
Van Etten was a native of St. Paul, Minnesota, the daughter of Isaac Van Etten, a local lawyer and politician, and Jane Oakes Van Etten. She was descended from the Van Etten family of New York. She studied music and opera singing in New York City, Paris, and London. Among her teachers was Mathilde Marchesi. Her stage debut came as Siébel in Faust at the Theatre Royal, Drury Lane in 1895.

She returned to the United States to concertize. By 1901 her reputation was good enough that Benton Harbor's orchestra was advertising itself using Van Etten's name, despite no formal connection or performances. In 1901 she married architect Alfred Burritt Andrews and settled in Evanston, Illinois. After her wedding she gave up singing to concentrate on composition, though she later worked as a teacher of voice in Chicago. Her teachers of composition included Alexander von Fielitz and Bernhard Ziehn.

She composed Guido Ferranti, a one-act opera to a libretto by Elsie M. Wilbor based on the play The Duchess of Padua by Oscar Wilde. It was premiered on December 29, 1914, in Chicago by the Century Opera Company at the Auditorium Theater. Hazel Eden was Beatrice and Worthe Faulkner Guido Ferranti; the opera was conducted by Agide Jacchia. The piece received the Bispham Memorial Medal Award. It was said that Van Etten had not studied orchestration, harmony or counterpoint prior to the composition of the opera. The opera won great critical acclaim, but appears not to have been performed again after its premiere. Its music has been described as "tuneful in the Puccini mode".

Van Etten died in Punta Gorda, Florida on April 17, 1950. She is interred in her family plot in St. Paul's Oakland Cemetery.

Two of her songs have been recorded.

== Selected compositions ==
=== Songs ===
- Rose, words by Austin Dobson
- A Vow, words by R. de Peyster Tytus
- Jealousy, words by Carrie Blake Morgan
- Destiny, words by William Richard Hereford
- The Joy of Life, words by William Ernest Henley
- Just for Luck, words by Anonymous
- Your Kiss, Beloved, words by Gouverneur Morris
- It was a Lover and his Lass, words by Shakespeare
- The Night has a Thousand Eyes, words by F. W. Bourdillon
- Pablo's Song, words by George Eliot (from The Spanish Gypsy)

=== Opera ===
- Guido Ferranti, libretto by Elsie M. Wilbor
- Ghouls

=== Choral ===
- Behold, the Master Passeth By, offertory hymn, words by W. W. How
- Nymph's Reply to the Passionate Shepherd, words by Walter Raleigh
- Lord be Gracious Unto Us

=== Instrumental ===
- Moods, for violin & piano
