= Eleri Ward =

American singer-songwriter and stage actress

- Ward in 2026

Background information
- Born: Eleri Ward; August 10, 1994 (age 32); Chicago, Illinois, U.S.
- Origin: New York City, U.S.
- Genres: Indie folk; musical theatre; pop
- Years active: 2016–present
- Label: Ghostlight (Sh-K-Boom)
- Website: eleriward.com

TikTok information
- Page: Eleri Ward
- Followers: 71.3K
- Last updated: May 2023

Eleri Ward (born August 10, 1994) is an American singer-songwriter, guitarist, and actor, best known for her Sufjan Stevens-inspired indie folk renditions of the works of composer Stephen Sondheim. Since garnering attention with covers posted to Instagram and TikTok, Ward has released two albums in this vein, A Perfect Little Death (2021) and Keep a Tender Distance (2022), both on Sh-K-Boom Records' Ghostlight imprint, as well as two self-released pop EPs, Prism (2020) and Friction (2021). In summer 2022, she toured with singer Josh Groban. As a stage actress, she has performed in productions for The Muny and MCC Theater.

== Early life ==
Ward grew up in the Burr Ridge suburb of Chicago, Illinois. Her mother was an interior designer and real estate broker, while her father was a consultant. Displaying an early interest in performing, Ward began violin and piano lessons at age 5, in addition to dabbling in viola and alto saxophone, and began singing lessons at age 8. She was also involved in a children's theater school, where she made her stage debut in a production of The Sound of Music. Ward attended high school at the Chicago Academy for the Arts, where she sang as Amy in a production of Company and where her department heads, Andy Robinson and Pat Rusk, first introduced her to the work of Stephen Sondheim when she was 14. At a young age, she saw Sweeney Todd performed at the Drury Lane Theatre and attended a Sondheim talk with critic Frank Rich.

Ward studied songwriting at the Berklee College of Music in Boston for a year, before transferring to the Boston Conservatory at Berklee, where she graduated with a BFA in musical theatre with an emphasis in songwriting and acting. During her second year at Boston Conservatory in 2015, Ward, feeling she had "hit a plateau" with the piano, taught herself to play guitar after buying one from a friend. After graduating, she moved to New York City, where she worked day jobs while auditioning for theater roles.

== Music career ==
=== A Perfect Little Death ===
Ward's music career began in March 2019 with an acoustic cover of Sondheim's "Every Day a Little Death" from A Little Night Music, which she posted to Instagram with the caption "Sufjan on Sondheim". Encouraged by the cover's positive reception and urged on by a friend, she began posting a series of such covers, beginning with "Johanna (Reprise)" from Sweeney Todd: The Demon Barber of Fleet Street, first posted the following day. She also began posting the covers to YouTube in 2019.

During the COVID-19 pandemic, Ward and her boyfriend moved from New York to Boston, and Ward self-released two pop EPs – Prism in May 2020 and Friction in June 2021. The latter was recorded in Brooklyn with producer Allen Tate. In August 2020, Ward was one of 30 semi-finalists of Playbill's Search for a Star competition, for which she performed "The Miller's Son" from A Little Night Music. She began uploading her Sondheim covers to TikTok in January 2021 at the advice of a friend. Further developing a following on the app, Ward was inspired to create an album of her Sondheim covers, A Perfect Little Death, which she recorded over the course of a month in the walk-in closet of her apartment. She initially promoted this music under the name SUF/SOND, before Stevens's legal representatives gently discouraged her from doing so.

After making a TikTok asking BroadwayWorld to write about her album, Ward was interviewed by the website, which brought her to the attention of Sh-K-Boom Records founder Kurt Deutsch. This led Deutsch to Ward's cover of "Johanna (Reprise)" on TikTok, and he subsequently contacted her and agreed to distribute her album via Sh-K-Boom's Ghostlight imprint. A Perfect Little Death was released on Ghostlight in 2021, with a digital release on June 4 and a physical release on October 1.

To promote the album, Ward and Ghostlight held two album release shows at Rockwood Music Hall in Manhattan. The first of these shows was attended by singer Josh Groban, who had been given Ward's album by Warner Music Group executive Kevin Gore. Groban invited her to join his Harmony Tour, alongside Lucia Micarelli and the Preservation Hall Jazz Band.

=== Keep a Tender Distance ===
Ward's covers gained wider attention following Sondheim's death in November 2021. She performed at Joe's Pub in March 2022, including a duet of "Loving You" from Sondheim's Passion with Donna Murphy, who had previously performed the song as the play's original Fosca.

Ward's second album of Sondheim covers, Keep a Tender Distance, was recorded at Better Company Studios in Brooklyn, with Tate returning as producer, his San Fermin bandmate Ellis Ludwig-Leone handling string arrangements, and Nathan Schram performing violin and viola. The album was released digitally by Ghostlight on September 16, 2022, later receiving a CD release on February 24, 2023. Singles released from the album included "No One Is Alone" from Into the Woods and "Not While I'm Around" from Sweeney Todd.

A national tour to promote the album was launched with a December 2022 show at Sony Hall, where Ward performed with surprise guests including Laura Benanti, Julia Murney, Jennifer Simard, Company's Bobby Conte and Six's Samantha Pauly. Another tour, billed as "The Tender Tour", was launched in February 2023 at the City Winery, with planned stops in Boston, Washington, D.C., Chicago, and Philadelphia.

== Theatre ==
Ward was an ensemble performer in The Muny's 2016 production of The Wizard of Oz, directed by John Tartaglia. In September 2021, she performed at the venue 54 Below as part of Ryan Scott Oliver's "RSO: Monday the 13th", alongside Kathryn Allison, Jackie Cox, Jay Armstrong Johnson, and Bonnie Milligan. She contributed an essay to When The Lights Are Bright Again, a book about the impact of the pandemic on the theater industry, and attended the book's launch party alongside Cody Renard Richard, Jonathan Cerullo, Kate Baldwin, and Arian Moayed. In May 2022, she performed at the 10th annual "Night of a Thousand Judys", a Judy Garland tribute concert hosted at Joe's Pub, which benefitted the Ali Forney Center and also featured Frances Ruffelle, Nathan Lee Graham, Kathryn Gallagher, Bonnie Milligan, and Hilary Kole.

Ward made her off-Broadway debut as an understudy in MCC Theater's 2022 production of Only Gold, a musical with songs by Kate Nash and a book by Andy Blankenbuehler, which starred Nash, Terrence Mann, Karine Plantadit, and Ryan Steele. Ward again collaborated with the MCC Theater in March 2023 for their annual showcase Miscast23, which was livestreamed from the Hammerstein Ballroom. The concert, which honored Vanessa Williams and Lianny Toval, saw Ward perform alongside Jordan Cooper, Jordan Donica, Jose Llana, Dylan Mulvaney, Rachel Zegler, Annaleigh Ashford, Josh Groban, LaChanze, Bonnie Milligan, and Ben Platt.

In the summer of 2024, she was featured as Jordan Baker and understudied the role of Daisy Buchanan in the world premiere of Florence Welch's Gatsby: An American Myth at the American Repertory Theatre.

== Artistry and recognition ==
Ward is primarily known for covering the work of Broadway composer Stephen Sondheim in an acoustic indie folk style inspired by Sufjan Stevens. Rob Weinert-Kendt of The New York Times wrote that she had "fused an emo Sondheim register with a familiar coffeehouse folk sound....In her hands, it’s not hard to imagine these songs as the creation of an especially gifted — if occasionally bloody-minded — indie singer-songwriter." Reviewing Keep a Tender Distance for BroadwayWorld, Ricky Pope wrote that Ward "is quite faithful to Sondheim's melodic lines, breathing new life into these standards through harmonies and new tempos". Pope also noted her "fondness for keys that are more modal than either major or minor...a perfect match for the frequent ambivalence of some of Sondheim's more brittle lyrics," and that, in addition to folk, the album featured electronic, waltz, bossa nova, and fandango elements on some songs. Weinert-Kendt characterized her singing voice as a "limber, expressive soprano", encompassing both a whistle-toned falsetto and a "Fosca-like lower register", while Pope described it as "a supple, rangy voice that is deeply rooted in emotion and story". In addition to Stevens, her arrangements have also been compared to Laura Marling, Joni Mitchell, Joan Baez, and Joan Shelley. Noted for her fingerstyle guitar playing, Ward is a self-taught guitarist and "mostly an ear-based musician";

On the subject of combining Stevens and Sondheim, Ward has noted that the two "share a poeticism that surrounds the sweet juxtaposition of beauty and darkness. They both dive right into the heart of what others might find somber and illuminate it with a sense of elegance and charm that makes that darkness palatable and enchanting." She has attributed her Stevens influence primarily to the albums Carrie & Lowell and The Age of Adz, particularly being inspired by his use of layered guitar picking patterns and call and response repetition. Her version of "Finishing the Hat" uses chords inspired by Stevens' "Futile Devices". With regard to Sondheim, Ward's approach differs from his in some ways; her arrangements prioritize melody, in contrast to Sondheim's emphasis on harmony and instrumentation, and she largely avoids Sondheim's moments of harsh dissonance (with the exception of "Pretty Women", which she ends with pinging discord). Besides Stevens and Sondheim, her other cited influences include Caroline Polachek, Andrew Bird, St. Vincent, and Still Woozy. Her version of "In Buddy's Eyes" was inspired by Barbara Cook's rendition.

Ward has received recognition from several Broadway figures. Donna Murphy praised her "unicorn of a voice," saying that "there is nothing about Eleri that is struggling for a quality; it just all feels so fluid", while Josh Groban noted the "wonderful line" of her voice and said that she "[finds] ways to smooth the songs out and bring even more heart into the performance". Sondheim himself reportedly praised her interpretation of his songs.

Outside of her Sondheim covers, Ward has also recorded two EPs of original pop music. This material was noted as having elements of R&B, electropop, soul, dance-pop, folk, and experimental pop, and drew comparisons to Sara Bareilles, Qveen Herby, and Miley Cyrus. Her single "Perfect" was said to evoke alternative pop, indie pop, 1990s pop rock, and Kate Bush-esque art pop. For her part, Ward described this music as a combination of Sara Bareilles, Dua Lipa, and Maggie Rogers.

== Personal life ==
Ward has a partner, Jamie Moore, who she met in 2017.

== Discography ==
Eleri Ward discography
- Studio albums: 2
- EPs: 2
- Singles: 11
- Music videos: 7

=== Studio albums ===
Title	Album details
A Perfect Little Death	Released: June 4, 2021; Label: Sh-K-Boom, Ghostlight; Format: CD, LP, digital download
Keep a Tender Distance	Released: September 16, 2022; Label: Sh-K-Boom, Ghostlight; Format: CD, LP, digital download

=== Live albums ===
Title	Album details
Acoustic Sondheim: Live from Brooklyn	Released: June 2, 2023; Label: Sh-K-Boom; Format: digital download

=== EPs ===
Title	Album details
Prism	Released: May 1, 2020; Label: Self-released; Format: digital download
Friction	Released: June 18, 2021; Label: Self-released; Format: digital download

=== Singles ===
Year	Title	Album	Source
2020	"The Girl in the Backseat"	Prism	Original
2020	"Mind Reader"	Prism	Original
2020	"Losing Me"	non-album single	Original
2020	"Do Yourself a Favor"	non-album single	Original
2021	"Johanna (Reprise)"	A Perfect Little Death	Sweeney Todd
2021	"Mess"	Friction	Original
2022	"Perfect"	non-album single	Original
2022	"Another Hundred People"	Keep a Tender Distance	Company
2022	"No One Is Alone"	Keep a Tender Distance	Into the Woods
2022	"Not While I'm Around"	Keep a Tender Distance	Sweeney Todd
2023	"Sunday" (Live in Studio)	Acoustic Sondheim: Live from Brooklyn	Sunday in the Park with George

=== Music videos ===
Year	Song	Director
2020	"Mind Reader	Eleri Ward
2020	"Take Me To Your Garden"	Eleri Ward
2021	"Mess"	Gabrielle Carrubba
2021	"Johanna (Reprise)"	Katie O'Halloran
2021	"More"	Katie O'Halloran
2022	"Not While I'm Around"	Bailie de Lacy
2022	"Move On"	Eleri Ward
