= Andrea Herbert Major =

Dancer and choreographer

- Occupations: Dancer and choreographer
- Organization: Roxbury Center for the Performing Arts
- Website: https://www.rcpaboston.org/

Andrea Herbert Major is a dancer and choreographer based in Boston. She is also the artistic director and founder of the Roxbury Center for the Performing Arts.

== Biography ==
Major grew up in the Dorchester neighborhood of Boston. As a child, she was not accepted into the white dance school. She and her mother were referred to the Kennedy Dancing School, run by Mildred Kennedy Bradic, a dancer who also trained Dianne Walker.

Major graduated from the Boston Conservatory of Music with a Bachelor of Fine Arts degree. She also studied at the Dance Theater of Harlem. Major began offering dance classes at the Roxbury YMCA and opened her first dance school in 1967. She changed the name of the dance school to the Roxbury Center for the Performing Arts in 1972. The dance school has been open for 57 years.

Her school has produced professional dancers like Christopher Huggins who joined the Alvin Ailey American Dance Theater.

In 2017, Major was honored by the Boston Dance Alliance as Dr. Michael Shannon Dance Champion. In 2023, she was recognized as one of "Boston’s most admired, beloved, and successful Black Women leaders" by the Black Women Lead project.
