= Teatro Grande =

Theater in Brescia, Italy

Coordinates: 45°32′12″N 10°13′15″E

Façade of the Teatro Grande

The Teatro Grande is the main performance venue for the city of Brescia, Italy. The venue hosts performances of operas, musicals, plays, concerts, ballet, modern dance, and other various entertainments.
