= Claire Rochester =

American actress

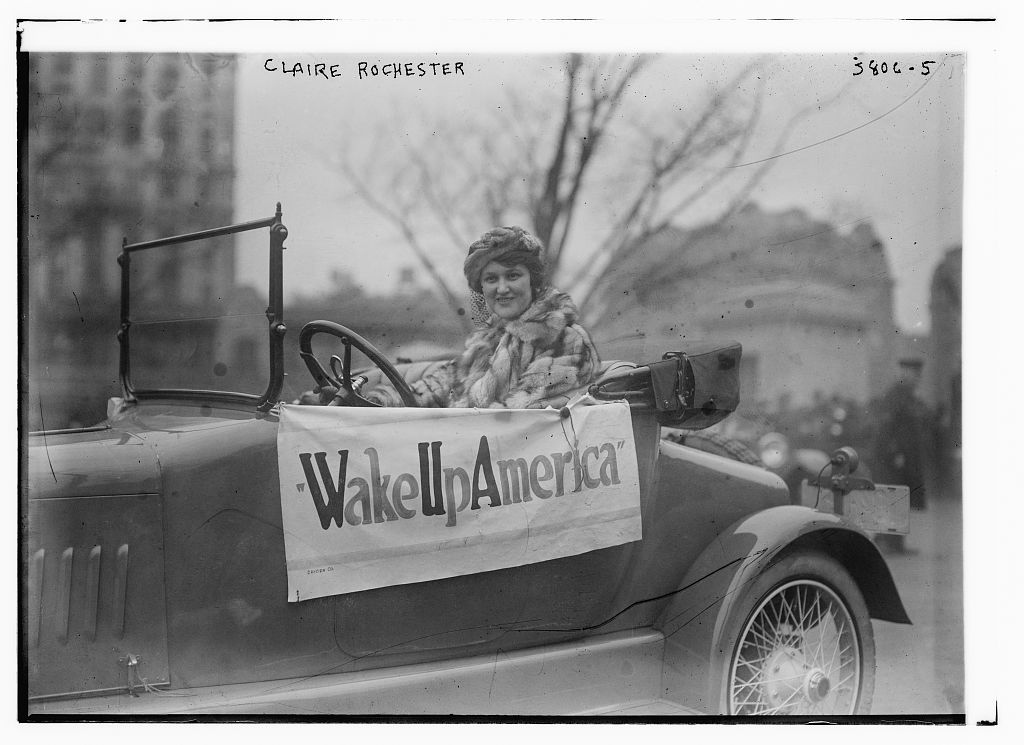
- Claire Rochester circa 1916 on her car tour
- Born: Claire Rochester; October 20, 1893; Atlanta, Georgia
- Died: April 16, 1921 (aged 27); Memphis, Tennessee
- Other name: Claire Rochester Miller
- Spouse: Miller
- Parent(s): John B. Rochester; Jane Bryant

Claire Rochester (May 10, 1893 - April 16, 1921) was a vaudeville performer.

== Biography ==
Claire Rochester was born in Atlanta, Georgia, on May 10, 1893, to John B. Rochester and Jane Bryant. Her father was a judge of the court of appeals. Her mother was from Gordon County, Georgia. She was a descendant of Nathaniel Rochester, the founder of Rochester, New York.

She moved to Boston, Massachusetts, to study at the Boston Conservatory of Music. She starred in Lew Fields production of All Aboard (play). High class vaudeville promoters competed for her services and she headlined as a two-a-day attraction following her stint with Fields.

In March 1916 she was among the entertainers in the Midnight Frolic produced by Flo Ziegfeld. The New Amsterdam Roof also featured performances by Will Rogers, the Dolly Sisters dancers and Oscar Shaw. One of the venues where she appeared was the Hippodrome Theatre, New York City. In August 1917 she was a part of a musical revue presented there which was staged by R.H. Burnside.

Rochester was active in the Liberty Bond movement during World War I. A car enthusiast, she took part in an automobile tour from New York City to San Francisco in 1917, to raise money for the war effort. She drove an Apperson Roadaplane on a previous coast-to-coast trip, establishing a record run.

Claire Rochester Miller died April 16, 1921, in Memphis, Tennessee.
