= Ester Ferrabini =

Italian opera singer (1885–1984)

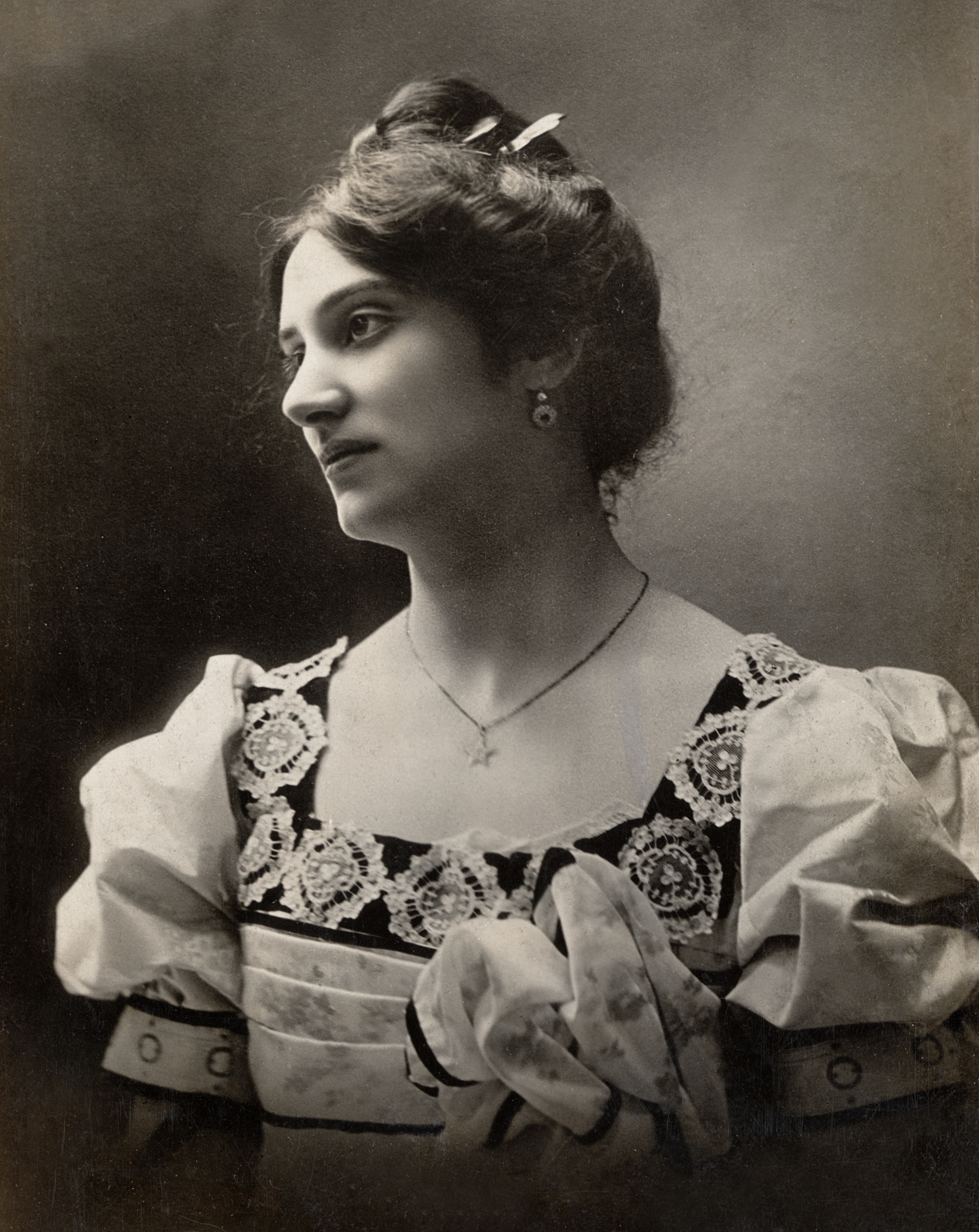
Ester Ferrabini, ca. 1906

Ester Ferrabini (October 12, 1885 – July 28, 1984) was an Italian opera singer.

== Early life ==
Ester Ada Maria Ferrabini was born in Venice, the daughter of Marcello Ferrabini, a college professor, and Lucina Pivetta Ferrabini. She studied voice with Angelina Ortolani Tiberini.

== Career ==
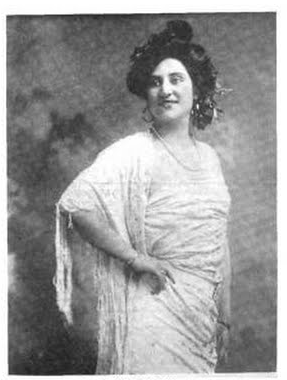
Ester Ferrabini as Carmen, from a 1917 publication

Ferrabini had her opera debut in 1905, in Brescia. She toured North America with the Ruggero Leoncavallo company in 1906, and moved to the United States in 1908. She was associated with the roles of Mimi in La bohème and the lead role in Carmen. She toured the American West in 1917 with Maggie Teyte and Nina Morgana in the La Scala Grand Opera Company. She also sang in Mexico City in 1917. Her last opera performance was as Carmen in 1924, in Boston, though she performed at a benefit concert for Italian war veterans in Boston in 1925. She also made at least two recordings.

Ferrabini lived in Montreal for two years, while her husband was musical director of the National Opera Company of Canada. She then lived in Boston, where her husband was conductor of the Boston Pops Orchestra. She joined the faculty of the Boston Conservatory in 1920, when her husband became president of that institution.

Arthur Fiedler, another Boston conductor, recalled Ferrabini fondly, saying "She was a very good singer, lovely voice. She was a very attractive woman, tall and majestic, good figure, not at all dumpy, domineering, but very understanding, very feminine." Architect Edgar Irving Williams wrote to his brother William Carlos Williams about seeing Ferrabini perform in 1906: "Never was I more smitten, I was all in. Talk about your concentrated blends of beauty, form, and sound. Ach Gott! She is perfection. What a head, neck, shoulders, pose, and what a voice."

== Personal life ==
Ester Ferrabini married fellow musician Agide Jacchia in 1911; their daughter Elsa was born in 1912. Ferrabini returned to the opera stage within weeks of Elsa's birth, and had Elsa on stage with her in a production of Madama Butterfly in 1917. In 1928 she moved back to Italy with her husband, who died in 1932. In widowhood, Ferrabini lived with her daughter and grandchildren, at Santa Margherita Ligure, a village near Portofino. Ester Ferrabini died there in 1984, aged 98 years.
