= List of compositions by Arthur Honegger =

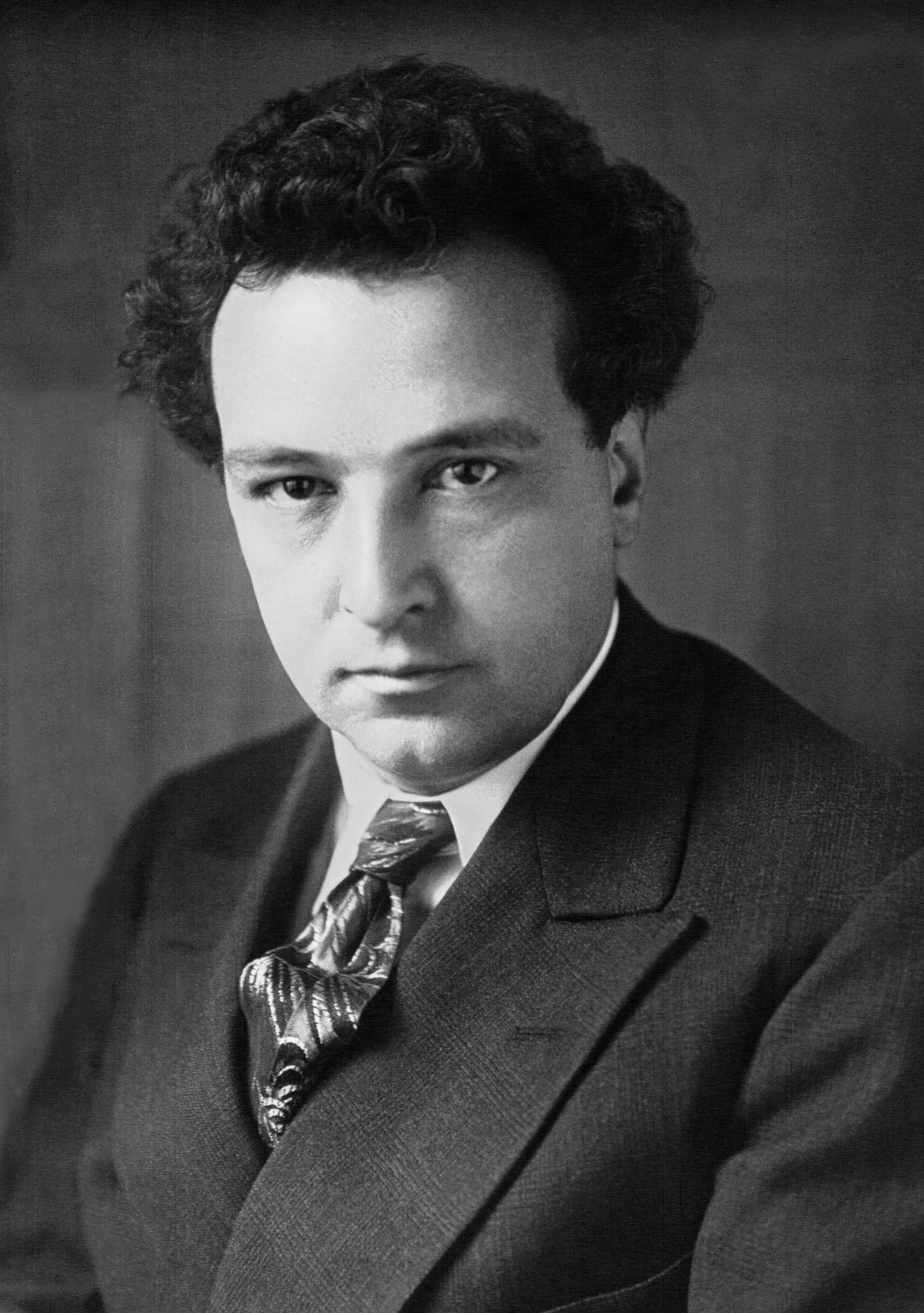
Arthur Honegger in 1928

This is a list of compositions by Arthur Honegger.

== List of works by main categories ==
Numbers preceded by “H.” are references from the complete catalogue by Harry Halbreich.

=== Orchestral music ===
Symphonies :

1930 : H 75 First Symphony in C
1941 : H 153 Second Symphony for strings and trumpet in D (Symphony for Strings)
1946 : H 186 Third Symphony (Symphonie liturgique)
1946 : H 191 Fourth Symphony in A (Deliciae basiliensis)
1950 : H 202 Fifth Symphony in D (Di tre re)

Symphonic movements :

1924 : H 53 Pacific 231 (Symphonic Movement No. 1)
1928 : H 67 Rugby (Symphonic Movement No. 2)
1933 : H 83 Symphonic Movement No. 3

Concertos :

1924 : H 55 Concertino for piano and orchestra
1929 : H 72 Concerto for cello and orchestra in C major
1948 : H 196 Concerto da camera, for flute, English horn and strings

Vocal orchestral music :

1932 : H 82 Le grand étang for voice and piano (or orchestra)
1937 : H 107 Les Mille et une nuits (The Thousand and One Nights) for Soprano, Tenor and orchestra
1937 : H 120 Jeunesse for voice and piano (or orchestra), or for unison chorus
1938 : H 132 L'Alarme for voice, chorus and orchestra, lost
1944 : H 177 Selzach Passion, incomplete
1947 : H 192 Mimaamaquim (Psaume CXXX) for voice and piano (or orchestra)
???? : H 222 La nuit est si profonde for voice and orchestra

Miscellaneous :

1917 : H 10 Prélude for Aglavaine et Sélysette
1917 : H 16 Le chant de Nigamon
1920 : H 31 Pastorale d'été
1921 : H 38 Horace victorieux, (Horace Triumphant) symphonie mimée
1923 : H 47 Chant de joie (Song of Joy)
1929 : H 74 J'avais un fidèle amant, variations for string quartet or string orchestra
1935 : H 92 Radio-panoramique, symphonic poem
1936 : H 102 Nocturne
1936 : H 105 Largo
1940 : H 141 Grad us for woodwinds, brass, and percussion
1942 : H 162 Le grand barrage
1945 : H 182 Sérénade à Angélique
1951 : H 203 Suite archaïque
1951 : H 204 Monopartita
1951 : H 207 Toccata on a theme of Campra, a movement from the collaborative work La guirlande de Campra
???? : H 218 Chevauchée
???? : H 219 Pathétique
???? : H 221 Allegretto

Adaptions :

1920 : H 27 Orchestration of a Mussorgsky song, lost
1923 : H 48a Prelude for the Tempest, after a work of Shakespeare
1923 : H 48b 2 Chants d'Ariel for voice and orchestra, adaptation of H 48
1925 : H 60a Orchestral Suite, adaption of L'Impératrice aux Rochers, H 60
1926 : H 61a Orchestral Suite, adaption of Phaedre, H 61
1928 : H 66a Blues, adaptation of Roses de métal, H 66
1928 : H 68a Suite, adaptation of Les Noces d'Amour et de Psyché, H 68
1928 : H 68b Prelude et fugue, adaptation of Les Noces d'Amour et de Psyché, H 68
1948 : H 71a Prélude, fugue et postlude, music from Amphion
1936 : H 81a Prélude, arioso et fughette sur le nom de BACH (String Orchestra version of H 81 for piano solo)
1934 : H 88a Orchestral Suite, adaption of Les Misérables
1943 : H 167a 2 Suites, music from Mermoz
1945 : H 174a Schwyzer Faschttag, suite from L'Appel de la montagne

=== Chamber music ===
String Quartets

1917 : H 15 String Quartet No. 1 in C minor
1929 : H 74 J'avais un fidèle amant, variations for string quartet or string orchestra
1935 : H 103 String Quartet No. 2 in D
1937 : H 114 String Quartet No. 3 in E

Sonatas and sonatinas

1912 : H 3 Sonate for violin and piano in D minor (No. 0)
1912 : H 4 Sonate for cello and piano, lost
1918 : H 17 First sonata for violin and piano in C♯ minor (First violin sonata)
1919 : H 24 Second sonata for violin and piano in B (Second violin sonata)
1920 : H 28 Sonata for viola and piano
1920 : H 29 Sonatina for two violins in G
1920 : H 32 Sonata for cello and piano in D minor
1922 : H 42 Sonatina for clarinet and piano
1932 : H 80 Sonatina for violin and cello in E minor
1940 : H 143 Sonata for solo violin in D minor

Vocal chamber music

1920 : H 30 "Pâques à New-York", (Easter in New York) after Blaise Cendrars, for mezzo-soprano and string quartet
1924 : H 54 Chanson de Ronsard for voice, flute and string quartet, or for voice and piano
1926 : H 63 Trois Chansons de La Petite Sirène (Three Songs of the little Siren) for voice, flute and string quartet, or for voice and piano
1939 : H 136a O Salutaris for voice and piano (or harp), or for voice, organ, piano and optional harp, adaptation of H 136

Miscellaneous :

1914 : H 6 Trio for violin, cello, and piano in F minor
1917 : H 13 Rhapsody for 2 flutes, clarinet and piano, or for 2 violins, viola and piano
1919 : H 22 Musique d'ameublement for flute, clarinet, trumpet, string quartet and piano
1920 : H 33 Hymn for 10 string instruments, in B minor
1921 : H 36 Cinéma-fantaisie for violin and piano, in collaboration with Darius Milhaud
1921 : H 39 Danse de la chèvre (The Goat Dance)
1929 : H 43 Three Counterpoints for flute, oboe, violin and cello
1929 : H 43a Suite for 2 pianos, adaption of Three Counterpoints, H 43
1925 : H 56 Prelude and Blues for 4 harps, lost
1925 : H 59 Hommage du trombone exprimant la tristesse de l'auteur absent for trombone and piano
1929 : H 73 Berceuses pour la Bobcisco for violin, flute (or violin), trumpet (or viola), cello and piano
1932 : H 79 Prelude pour la Sous-basse (Contrabass) et Piano
1934 : H 89 Petite Suite for 2 instruments and piano
1940 : H 139 Partita for 2 pianos
1941 : H 147 L'Ombre de la Ravine for string quartet, flute and harp (The Shadow of the Ravine)
1945 : H 178 O temps suspends ton vol for violin and piano
1945 : H 179 Morceau de concours for violin and piano
1945 : H 181 Paduana for cello
1947 : H 193 Intrada for C trumpet and piano
1953 : H 211 Romance for flute and piano
1929 : H 214 Arioso for violin and piano
1943 : H 215 Andante for 4 Ondes Martenots
???? : H 216 Colloque for flute, celesta, violin and viola

=== Music for piano ===
Original works :

1910 : H 1 3 Pieces (Scherzo, Humoresque, Adagio)
1916 : H 8 Toccata and variations
1919 : H 23 3 Pieces (Prélude, Hommage à Maurice Ravel, Danse)
1920 : H 25 7 Pièces brèves
1920 : H 26 Sarabande for L'Album des Six
1923 : H 52 Le Cahier romand
1928 : H 69 Hommage à Albert Roussel
1932 : H 81 Prélude, arioso, and fughetta on the name BACH
1935 : H 95 Berceuse, from the collaborative work Bal des petits lits blancs
1937 : H 115 Scenic Railway, from collaborative work Parc d'attractions Expo 1937
1941 : H 145 Petits Airs sur une basse célèbre
1943 : H 173 2 Esquisses
???? : H 213 Très modéré

Adaptions :

1925 : H 60b La Neige sur Rome, arrangement from L'Impératrice aux Rochers, H 60
1929 : H 60c Suite (Partita) for piano, possibly in collaboration with Andrée Vaurabourg, adaption of L'Impératrice aux Rochers, H 60
1931 : H 76a Suite, adaptation of Les Aventures du roi Pausole, H 76
1943 : H 166b 3 Pièces de Le capitaine Fracasse, music from Le Capitaine Fracasse
1945 : H 183a Piéces de 'Un ami viendra ce soir, music form Un Ami viendra ce soir

=== Ballets ===
1918 : H 19 Le dit des jeux du monde
1920 : H 34 Vérité ? Mensonge ? (Truth? Lies?), partially lost
1921 : H 35 La noce massacrée (The Ruined Wedding) from the collaborative work Les mariés de la tour Eiffel (The Wedding on the Eiffel Tower)
1921 : H 38 Horace victorieux, symphonie mimée
1922 : H 40 Skating Rink, choreographic symphony
1922 : H 46 Fantasio
1925 : H 58 Sous-marine (mimed scene)
1928 : H 66 Roses de métal, lost
1928 : H 68 Les noces d'amour et de Psyché (The Wedding of Cupid and Psyche), arrangement of music by Johann Sebastian Bach
1929 : H 71 Amphion, melodrama by Paul Valéry
1934 : H 85 Sémiramis, melodrama by Paul Valéry
1935 : H 96 Icare (Icarus)
1937 : H 113 Un oiseau blanc s'est envolé (A White Bird Has Flown Away)
1937 : H 123 Le cantique des cantiques (The Song of Songs)
1940 : H 142 La naissance des couleurs (The Birth of Colors)
1941 : H 154 Le mangeur de rêves (The Dream Eater), lost
1943 : H 174 L'appel de la montagne (Tha Call of the Mountain)
1945 : H 180 Chota Roustaveli, in collaboration with Alexander Tcherepnin and Tibor Harsányi, piano arrangement extent
1946 : H 189 Sortilèges (Magic Spell), lost
1950 : H 200 De la musique, lost

=== Operas ===
1903 : H I Philippa, libretto by composer
1904 : H II Sigismond, lost
1907 : H III La Esméralda, unfinished
1918 : H 20 La mort de Sainte Alméenne (The Death of Saint Alméenne), for voice and piano, orchestration in 2005 by Nicolas Bacri assisted by Harry Halbreich
1925 : H 57a Judith, drame biblique — 31 minutes of incidental music for the 3-hour work by René Morax; requires soprano, mezzo-soprano, a separate vocal trio, chorus and orchestra
1925 : H 57b Judith, opéra sérieux — reworking of the above; 55 minutes' long; three acts; libretto by Morax; scored for soprano, mezzo-soprano, tenor, baritone and bass soloists, a separate vocal trio, chorus and orchestra
1926 : H 65 Antigone, 'tragédie musicale', libretto by Jean Cocteau based on Sophocles

=== Operettas ===
1930 : H 76 Les aventures du roi Pausole, libretto by Albert Willemetz
1931 : H 78 La Belle de Moudon
1937 : H 128 Les Petites Cardinales, libretto by Albert Willemetz
1937 : H 108 L'Aiglon, 'drame musical' (in collaboration with Jacques Ibert)

=== Oratorios ===
1907 : H IV Oratorio du calvaire, lost
1918 : H 18 Cantique de Pâques, for soloists, female chorus & orchestra
1921 : H 37 Le Roi David (King David) libretto by René Morax, Paris version for orchestra in 1923
1927 : H 57c Judith — final version, tauter than H 57b (see above under "Operas")
1931 : H 77 Cris du monde, (Cries of the World) libretto by René Bizet
1935 : H 99 Jeanne d'Arc au bûcher, libretto by Paul Claudel, version with prologue in 1941
1938 : H 131 La danse des morts, (The Dance of the Dead) libretto by Paul Claudel
1939 : H 135 Nicolas de Flue
1953 : H 212 Une Cantate de Noël (A Christmas cantata)

=== Incidental music ===
1919 : H 21 La danse macabre, lost
1922 : H 41 Saül for trumpet, cello and percussion, incomplete
1922 : H 45 Antigone for oboe and harp
1925 : H 60 L'impératrice aux rochers (The Empress of the Rocks)
1926 : H 61 Phaedre
1929 : H 48 The Tempest, for the play by William Shakespeare, partially lost
1923 : H 49 Liluli for voice, chorus, piccolo, cello and piano
1926 : H 62 Pour le cantique de Salomon (For the Song of Solomon)
1933 : H 84 Les douze coups de minuit, incomplete
1936 : H 104 La marche sur la Bastille
1937 : H 111 Prelude á la Mort de Jaurès from the show Liberté, in collaboration with Arthur Hoérée, lost
1937 : H 119a Two songs from the La construction d'une cité
1941 : H 146 La Mandragore
1941 : H 147 L'ombre de la ravine
1941 : H 149 Les suppliantes
1941 : H 150 800 meters, lost
1941 : H 151 La ligne d'horizon
1943 : H 163 Pasiphaé
1943 : H 165 Le soulier de satin, livret de Paul Claudel
1943 : H 172 Sodom and Gomorrah
1944 : H 175 Charles le téméraire (Charles the Bold)
1946 : H 187 Prométhée (Prometheus)
1946 : H 190 Hamlet
1947 : H 194 Oedipus
1948 : H 195 L'état de siège, by Albert Camus, lost
1949 : H 198 Marche contre la mort, lost
1950 : H 199 Tête d'or
1951 : H 208 On ne badine pas avec l'amour, lost
1952 : H 210 Oedipus Rex
???? : H 217 Introduction et danse
???? : H 220 Vivace

=== Music for radio ===
1940 : H 140 Christopher Columbus
1944 : H 176 Battements du monde
1949 : H 197 Saint François d'Assise
1951 : H 209 La Rédemption de François Villon

=== Film music ===
1922 : H 44 La Roue by Abel Gance
1927 : H 64 Napoléon by Abel Gance
1934 : H 86 Rapt, in collaboration with Arthur Hoérée
1934 : H 87 L'idée, animation film by Berthold Bartosch
1934 : H 88 Les Misérables
1934 : H 90 Cessez le feu
1934 : H 91 Le roi de la camargue, in collaboration with Alexis Roland-Manuel, incomplete
1935 : H 93 Der Dämon des Himalaya
1935 : H 94 Crime et chatiment
1935 : H 98 L’Équipage, in collaboration with Maurice Thiriet
1936 : H 100 Les mutinés de l’Elseneur
1936 : H 101 Mayerling, in collaboration with Maurice Jaubert
1936 : H 106 Nitchevo, in collaboration with Casimir Oberfeld
1937 : H 109 Mademoiselle Docteur
1937 : H 110 Marthe Richard au service de la France
1937 : H 112 Liberté, in collaboration with Arthur Hoérée, lost
1937 : H 116 La citadelle du silence, in collaboration with Darius Milhaud
1937 : H 117 Regain, partially lost
1937 : H 121 Visages de la France, partially lost
1937 : H 124 Miarka ou la fille à l’ourse, in collaboration with Tibor Harsányi
1937 : H 125 Passeurs d'hommes, in collaboration with Arthur Hoérée, lost
1937 : H 126 Les bâtisseurs, in collaboration with Arthur Hoérée
1938 : H 129 Pygmalion, in collaboration with William Axt, partially lost
1938 : H 130 L'Or dans la montagne, in collaboration with Arthur Hoérée
1939 : H 134 Le Déserteur by Moguy
1939 : H 136 Cavalcade d'amour by Bernard, in collaboration with Darius Milhaud, lost
1942 : H 155 Chant de libération, lost
1942 : H 156 Le Journal tombe à cinq heures by Lacombe
1942 : H 157 Huit Hommes dans un château by Pottier, in collaboration with Arthur Hoérée
1942 : H 158 Les Antiquités de l'Asie occidentale by Membrin
1942 : H 159 Musiques pour France-actualités, lost
1942 : H 160 La Boxe en France by Gasnier-Raymond, in collaboration with André Jolivet
1942 : H 161 Secrets by Blanchart, lost
1943 : H 164 Callisto, ou la petite nymphe de Diane, in collaboration with Alexis Roland-Manuel, piano arrangement extent
1943 : H 166 Le Capitaine Fracasse by Abel Gance, lost
1943 : H 167 Mermoz by Cuny
1943 : H 170 La Nativité by Marty, incomplete
1943 : H 171 Un Seul Amour by Blanchart
1945 : H 183 Un Ami viendra ce soir by Bernard
1946 : H 185 Les Démons de l'aube by Allégret, in collaboration with Arthur Hoérée
1946 : H 188 Un Revenant by Christian-Jacques, in collaboration with Arthur Hoérée, in which Honegger plays the composer
1950 : H 201 Bourdelle by Lucot
1951 : H 205 La Tour de Babel by Rony, in collaboration with Tibor Harsányi and Arthur Hoérée, lost
1951 : H 206 Paul Claudel by Gillet

=== Art songs ===
Original works :

1906 : H V 3 Songs, lost
1908 : H VI 6 Sonatas
1910 : H 2 Adagio, lost
???? : H 5 2 Songs, lost
1916 : H 7 4 Poems
1916 : H 9 3 Poèmes de Paul Fort
1917 : H 11 Nature morte
1917 : H 12 6 Poèmes d'Apollinaire
1923 : H 51 6 Poésies de Jean Cocteau
1929 : H 70 Vocalise-etude
1932 : H 82 Le grand étang for voice and piano or orchestra
1935 : H 97 Fièvre jaune for voice (or voices) and piano
1937 : H 118 Tuet's weh?
1937 : H 120 Jeunesse for voice and piano (or orchestra), or for unison chorus
1937 : H 122 Armistice for voice (or unison chorus) and piano
1937 : H 127 Chansons de René Kerdyk
1938 : H 133 Hommage au travail
1940 : H 138 3 Poèmes de Claudel
1940 : H 144 3 Psalms
1941 : H 148 5 Petit cours de morale
1941 : H 152 Saluste du Bartas
1943 : H 168 Céline
1943 : H 169 Panis angelicus
1944 : H 184 Chansons pour voix grave
1947 : H 192 Mimaamaquim (Psaume CXXX) for voice and piano (or orchestra)

Adaptions :

1936 : H 106a 2 Chansons de Nitchevo, adaption of Nitchevo, H 106
1937 : H 124a 2 Chansons du Miarka ou la fille à l'ourse, music from Miarka ou la fille à l’ourse, H 124
1939 : H 136a O Salutaris for voice and piano (or harp), or for voice, organ, piano and optional harp, adaptation of H 136
1943 : H 166a 4 Chansons pour Le capitaine Fracasse, music from Le Capitaine Fracasse, H 166, No. 1 lost
1943 : H 171a 2 Romances sentimentales, music from Un Seul Amour

=== Miscellaneous works ===
1907 : H Ia Overture to Philippa, 2 voices and piano
1907 : H IIIa Overture to La Esméralda, 2 voices and piano
1917 : H 14 Fugue et choral for organ
1923 : H 50 Chanson de Fagus for soprano, chorus and piano
1911 : H 110a Orgue dans l'église for organ, music used in Marthe Richard au service de la France, H 110
1937 : H 126a Hymne du bâtiment, music from Les bâtisseurs, H 126
1939 : H 137 Possèdes-tu, pauvre pécheur for unison chorus, harmonium or piano
1945 : H 183b Chant de la délivrance for voices and piano, music form Un Ami viendra ce soir

=== Books ===
L'incantation aux fossiles
Je suis compositeur

== List of works by opus numbers ==
Opus numbers originate from the complete catalogue by Harry Halbreich.

1903 : H I Philippa, opera, libretto by composer
1907 : H Ia Overture to Philippa, 2 voices and piano
1904 : H II Sigismond, opera, lost
1907 : H III La Esméralda, unfinished
1907 : H IIIa Overture to La Esméralda, 2 voices and piano
1907 : H IV Oratorio du calvaire, lost
1908 : H V 3 Songs, lost
1908 : H VI 6 Sonatas for voice and piano
1910 : H 1 3 Pieces for piano
1910 : H 2 Adagio for voice and piano, lost
1912 : H 3 Sonata for violin and piano in D minor (No. 0)
1912 : H 4 Sonata for cello and piano, lost
???? : H 5 2 Songs, lost
1914 : H 6 Trio for violin, cello, and piano in F minor
1916 : H 7 4 Poems for voice and piano
1916 : H 8 Toccata and variations
1916 : H 9 3 Poèmes de Paul Fort for voice and piano
1917 : H 10 Prélude for Aglavaine et Sélysette
1917 : H 11 Nature morte for voice and piano
1917 : H 12 6 Poèmes d'Apollinaire for voice and piano
1917 : H 13 Rhapsody for 2 flutes, clarinet and piano, or for 2 violins, viola and piano
1917 : H 14 Fugue et choral for organ
1917 : H 15 String Quartet No. 1 in C minor
1917 : H 16 Le Chant de Nigamon
1918 : H 17 First sonata for violin and piano in C♯ minor (First violin sonata)
1918 : H 18 Cantique de Pâques, for soloists, female chorus & orchestra
1918 : H 19 Le Dit des jeux du monde
1918 : H 20 La Mort de Sainte Alméenne (The Death of Saint Alméenne), for voice and piano, orchestration in 2005 by Nicolas Bacri assisted by Harry Halbreich
1919 : H 21 La Danse macabre, lost
1919 : H 22 Musique d'ameublement for flute, clarinet, trumpet, string quartet and piano
1919 : H 23 Three pieces for piano (Prélude, Hommage à Maurice Ravel, Danse)
1919 : H 24 Second sonata for violin and piano in B (Second violin sonata)
1920 : H 25 7 Pièces brèves
1920 : H 26 Sarabande for piano
1920 : H 27 Orchestration of a Mussorgsky song, lost
1920 : H 28 Sonata for viola and piano
1920 : H 29 Sonatina for two violins in G
1920 : H 30 Pâques à New-York, (Easter in New York) after Blaise Cendrars, for mezzo-soprano and string quartet
1920 : H 31 Pastorale d'été
1920 : H 32 Sonata for cello and piano in D minor
1920 : H 33 Hymn for 10 string instruments, in B minor
1920 : H 34 Vérité ? Mensonge ? (Truth? Lies?), partially lost
1921 : H 35 La Noce massacrée (The Ruined Wedding) from the collaborative work Les mariés de la tour eiffel (The Couple Married on the Eiffel Tower)
1921 : H 36 Cinéma-fantaisie for violin and piano, in collaboration with Darius Milhaud
1921 : H 37 Le Roi David (King David) libretto by René Morax, version parisienne pour orchestre en 1923
1921 : H 38 Horace victorieux, (Horace Triumphant) symphonie mimée
1921 : H 39 Danse de la chèvre (The Goat Dance)
1922 : H 40 Skating Rink, choreographic symphony
1922 : H 41 Saül for trumpet, cello and percussion, incomplete
1922 : H 42 Sonatina for clarinet and piano
1929 : H 43 Three Counterpoints for flute, oboe, violin and cello
1929 : H 43a Suite for 2 pianos, adaption of Three Counterpoints, H 43
1922 : H 44 La Roue de Abel Gance
1922 : H 45 Antigone for oboe and harp
1922 : H 46 Fantasio
1923 : H 47 Chant de joie (Song of Joy)
1929 : H 48 The Tempest, for the play by William Shakespeare, partially lost
1923 : H 48a Prelude for the Tempest, after the play by Shakespeare
1923 : H 48b 2 Chants d'Ariel for voice and orchestra, adaptation of H 48
1923 : H 49 Liluli for voice, chorus, piccolo, cello and piano
1923 : H 50 Chanson de Fagus for soprano, chorus and piano
1923 : H 51 6 Poésies de Jean Cocteau for voice and piano
1923 : H 52 Le Cahier romand
1923 : H 53 Pacific 231 (Symphonic Movement No. 1)
1924 : H 54 Chanson de Ronsard for voice, flute and string quartet, or for voice and piano
1924 : H 55 Concertino for piano and orchestra
1925 : H 56 Prelude and Blues for 4 harps, lost
1925 : H 57a Judith, incidental music
1925 : H 57b Judith, serious opera, libretto by René Morax
1927 : H 57c Judith, oratorio, libretto by René Morax
1925 : H 58 Sous-marine (mimed sccene)
1925 : H 59 Hommage du trombone exprimant la tristesse de l'auteur absent for trombone and piano
1925 : H 60 L'Impératrice aux rochers (The Empress of the Rocks)
1925 : H 60a Orchestral Suite, adaption of L'Impératrice aux Rochers, H 60
1925 : H 60b La Neige sur Rome, arrangement from L'Impératrice aux Rochers, H 60
1929 : H 60c Suite (Partita) for piano, possibly in collaboration with Andrée Vaurabourg, adaption of L'Impératrice aux Rochers, H 60
1926 : H 61 Phaedre
1926 : H 61a Orchestral Suite, adaption of Phaedre, H 61
1926 : H 62 Pour le cantique de Salomon (For the Song of Solomon)
1926 : H 63 Trois Chansons de La Petite Sirène (Three Songs of the little Siren) for voice, flute and string quartet, or for voice and piano
1927 : H 64 Napoléon de Abel Gance
1926 : H 65 Antigone, libretto by Jean Cocteau based on Sophocles
1928 : H 66 Roses de métal, lost
1928 : H 66a Blues, adaptation of Roses de métal, H 66
1928 : H 67 Rugby (Symphonic Movement No. 2)
1928 : H 68 Les Noces d'Amour et de Psyché (The Wedding of Cupid and Psyche), arrangement of music by Johann Sebastian Bach
1928 : H 68a Suite, adaptation of Les Noces d'Amour et de Psyché, H 68
1928 : H 68b Prelude et fugue, adaptation of Les Noces d'Amour et de Psyché, H 68
1928 : H 69 Hommage à Albert Roussel
1929 : H 70 Vocalise-etude for voice and piano
1929 : H 71 Amphion, melodrama by Paul Valéry
1948 : H 71a Prélude, fugue et postlude, music from Amphion
1929 : H 72 Concerto for cello and orchestra in C major
1929 : H 73 Berceuses pour la Bobcisco for violin, flute (or violin), trumpet (or viola), cello and piano
1929 : H 74 J'avais un fidèle amant, variations for string quartet or string orchestra
1930 : H 75 First Symphony in C
1930 : H 76 Les Aventures du roi Pausole, libretto by Albert Willemetz
1931 : H 76a Suite for piano, adaptation of Les Aventures du roi Pausole, H 76
1931 : H 77 Cris du monde, (Cries of the World) libretto by René Bizet
1931 : H 78 La Belle de Moudon
1932 : H 79 Prelude pour la Sous-basse (Contrebasse) et piano
1932 : H 80 Sonatina for violin and cello in E minor
1932 : H 81 Prélude, arioso, and fughetta on the name BACH
1936 : H 81a Prélude, arioso et fughette sur le nom de BACH (String Orchestra version of H 81 for piano solo)
1932 : H 82 Le grand étang for voice and piano (or orchestra)
1933 : H 83 Symphonic Movement No. 3
1933 : H 84 Les douze coups de minuit, incomplete
1934 : H 85 Sémiramis, melodrama by Paul Valéry
1934 : H 86 Rapt, in collaboration with Arthur Hoérée
1934 : H 87 L'idée, film d'animation de Berthold Bartosch
1934 : H 88 Les Misérables
1934 : H 88a Orchestral Suite, adaption of Les Misérables
1934 : H 89 Petite Suite for 2 instruments and piano
1934 : H 90 Cessez le feu
1934 : H 91 Le roi de la camargue, in collaboration with Alexis Roland-Manuel, incomplete
1935 : H 92 Radio-panoramique, symphonic poem
1935 : H 93 Der Dämon des Himalayas
1935 : H 94 Crime et chatiment
1935 : H 95 Berceuse for piano, from the collaborative work Bal des petits lits blancs
1935 : H 96 Icare (Icarus)
1935 : H 97 Fièvre jaune for voice (or voices) and piano
1935 : H 98 L’Équipage, in collaboration with Maurice Thiriet
1935 : H 99 Jeanne d'Arc au Bûcher, libretto by Paul Claudel, version with prologue in 1941
1936 : H 100 Les mutinés de l’Elseneur
1936 : H 101 Mayerling, in collaboration with Maurice Jaubert
1936 : H 102 Nocturne for orchestra
1935 : H 103 String Quartet No. 2 in D
1936 : H 104 La marche sur la Bastille
1936 : H 105 Largo for orchestra
1936 : H 106 Nitchevo, in collaboration with Casimir Oberfeld
1936 : H 106a 2 Chansons de Nitchevo for voice and piano, adaption of Nitchevo, H 106
1937 : H 107 Les Mille et une nuits (The Thousand and One Nights) for Soprano, Tenor and orchestra
1937 : H 108 L'Aiglon (in collaboration with Jacques Ibert)
1937 : H 109 Mademoiselle Docteur
1937 : H 110 Marthe Richard au service de la France
1911 : H 110a Orgue dans l'église for organ, music used in Marthe Richard au service de la France, H 110
1937 : H 111 Prelude á la Mort de Jaurès from the show Liberté, in collaboration with Arthur Hoérée, lost
1937 : H 112 Liberté, in collaboration with Arthur Hoérée, lost
1937 : H 113 Un Oiseau blanc s'est envolé (A White Bird Has Flown Away)
1937 : H 114 String Quartet No. 3 in E
1937 : H 115 Scenic Railway, from collaborative work Parc d'attractions Expo 1937
1937 : H 116 La citadelle du silence, in collaboration with Darius Milhaud
1937 : H 117 Regain, partially lost
1937 : H 118 Tuet's weh? for voice and piano
1937 : H 119a Two songs from the La Construction d'une cité
1937 : H 120 Jeunesse for voice and piano (or orchestra), or for unison chorus
1937 : H 121 Visages de la France, partially lost
1937 : H 122 Armistice for voice (or unison chorus) and piano
1937 : H 123 Le Cantique des cantiques (The Song of Songs)
1937 : H 124 Miarka ou la fille à l’ourse, in collaboration with Tibor Harsányi
1937 : H 124a 2 Chansons du Miarka ou la fille à l'ourse for voice and piano, music from Miarka ou la fille à l’ourse, H 124
1937 : H 125 Passeurs d'hommes, in collaboration with Arthur Hoérée, lost
1937 : H 126 Les bâtisseurs, in collaboration with Arthur Hoérée
1937 : H 126a Hymne du bâtiment, music from Les bâtisseurs, H 126
1937 : H 127 Chansons de René Kerdyk for voice and piano
1937 : H 128 Les Petites Cardinales, libretto by Albert Willemetz
1938 : H 129 Pygmalion, in collaboration with William Axt, partially lost
1938 : H 130 L'Or dans la montagne, in collaboration with Arthur Hoérée
1938 : H 131 La Danse des morts, (The Dance of the Dead) libretto by Paul Claudel
1938 : H 132 L'Alarme for voice, chorus and orchestra, lost
1938 : H 133 Hommage au travail for voice and piano
1939 : H 134 Le Déserteur de Moguy
1939 : H 135 Nicolas de Flue
1939 : H 136 Cavalcade d'amour de Bernard, in collaboration with Darius Milhaud, lost
1939 : H 136a O Salutaris for voice and piano (or harp), or for voice, organ, piano and optional harp, adaptation of H 136
1939 : H 137 Possèdes-tu, pauvre pécheur for unison chorus, harmonium or piano
1940 : H 138 3 Poèmes de Claudel for voice and piano
1940 : H 139 Partita for 2 pianos
1940 : H 140 Christopher Columbus
1940 : H 141 Grad us for woodwinds, brass, and percussion
1940 : H 142 La Naissance des couleurs (The Birth of Colors)
1940 : H 143 Sonata for solo violin in D minor
1940 : H 144 3 Psalms for voice and piano
1941 : H 145 Petits Airs sur une basse célèbre
1941 : H 146 La Mandragore
1941 : H 147 L'Ombre de la Ravine for string quartet, flute and harp (The Shadow of the Ravine)
1941 : H 148 5 Petit cours de morale for voice and piano
1941 : H 149 Les Suppliantes
1941 : H 150 800 Meters, lost
1941 : H 151 La Ligne d'horizon
1941 : H 152 Saluste du Bartas for voice and piano
1941 : H 153 Second Symphony for strings and trumpet in D (Symphony for Strings)
1941 : H 154 Le Mangeur de rêves (The Dream Eater), lost
1942 : H 155 Chant de libération, lost
1942 : H 156 Le Journal tombe à cinq heures de Lacombe
1942 : H 157 Huit Hommes dans un château de Pottier, in collaboration with Arthur Hoérée
1942 : H 158 Les Antiquités de l'Asie occidentale de Membrin
1942 : H 159 Musiques pour France-actualités, lost
1942 : H 160 La Boxe en France de Gasnier-Raymond, in collaboration with André Jolivet
1942 : H 161 Secrets de Blanchart, lost
1942 : H 162 Le Grand Barrage
1943 : H 163 Pasiphaé
1943 : H 164 Callisto, ou la petite nymphe de Diane, in collaboration with Alexis Roland-Manuel, piano arrangement extent
1943 : H 165 Le Soulier de satin, livret de Paul Claudel
1943 : H 166 Le Capitaine Fracasse de Abel Gance, lost
1943 : H 166a 4 Chansons pour Le capitaine Fracasse for voice and piano, music from Le Capitaine Fracasse, H 166, No. 1 lost
1943 : H 166b 3 Pièces de Le capitaine Fracasse for piano, music from Le Capitaine Fracasse
1943 : H 167 Mermoz de Cuny
1943 : H 167a 2 Suites for orchestra, music from Mermoz
1943 : H 168 Céline for voice and piano
1943 : H 169 Panis angelicus for voice and piano
1943 : H 170 La Nativité de Marty, incomplete
1943 : H 171 Un Seul Amour de Blanchart
1943 : H 171a 2 Romances sentimentales for voice and piano, music from Un Seul Amour
1943 : H 172 Sodom and Gomorrah
1943 : H 173 2 Esquisses for piano
1943 : H 174 L'Appel de la montagne (Tha Call of the Mountain)
1945 : H 174a Schwyzer Faschttag, orchestral suite from L'Appel de la montagne
1944 : H 175 Charles le Téméraire (Charles the Bold)
1944 : H 176 Battements du monde
1944 : H 177 Selzach Passion, incomplete
1945 : H 178 O temps suspends ton vol for violin and piano
1945 : H 179 Morceau de concours for violin and piano
1945 : H 180 Chota Roustaveli, in collaboration with Alexander Tcherepnin and Tibor Harsányi, piano arrangement extent
1945 : H 181 Paduana for cello
1945 : H 182 Sérénade à Angélique for orchestra
1945 : H 183 Un Ami viendra ce soir de Bernard
1945 : H 183a Piéces de 'Un ami viendra ce soir for piano, music form Un Ami viendra ce soir
1945 : H 183b Chant de la délivrance for voices and piano, music form Un Ami viendra ce soir
1944 : H 184 Chansons pour voix grave for voice and piano
1946 : H 185 Les Démons de l'aube d'Allégret, in collaboration with Arthur Hoérée
1946 : H 186 Third Symphony (Symphonie liturgique)
1946 : H 187 Prométhée (Prometheus)
1946 : H 188 Un Revenant de Christian-Jacques, in collaboration with Arthur Hoérée
1946 : H 189 Sortilèges (Magic Spell), lost
1946 : H 190 Hamlet
1946 : H 191 Fourth Symphony in A (Deliciae basiliensis)
1947 : H 192 Mimaamaquim (Psaume CXXX) for voice and piano (or orchestra)
1947 : H 193 Intrada for Trumpet and Piano
1947 : H 194 Oedipus
1948 : H 195 L'État de siège, by Albert Camus, lost
1948 : H 196 'Concerto da camera, for flute, English horn and strings
1949 : H 197 Saint François d'Assise
1949 : H 198 Marche contre la mort, lost
1950 : H 199 Tête d'or
1950 : H 200 De la musique, lost
1950 : H 201 Bourdelle de Lucot
1950 : H 202 Fifth Symphony in D (Di tre re)
1951 : H 203 Suite archaïque
1951 : H 204 Monopartita
1951 : H 205 La Tour de Babel de Rony, in collaboration with Tibor Harsányi and Arthur Hoérée, lost
1951 : H 206 Paul Claudel de Gillet
1951 : H 207 Toccata on a theme of Campra, from collaborative work La Guirlande de Campra
1951 : H 208 On ne badine pas avec l'amour, lost
1951 : H 209 La Rédemption de François Villon
1952 : H 210 Oedipus Rex
1953 : H 211 Romance for flute and piano
1953 : H 212 Une Cantate de Noël (A Christmas Cantata)
???? : H 213 Très modéré for piano
1929 : H 214 Arioso for violin and piano
1943 : H 215 Andante for 4 Ondes Martenots
???? : H 216 Colloque for flute, celesta, violin and viola
???? : H 217 Introduction et danse
???? : H 218 Chevauchée
???? : H 219 Pathétique
???? : H 220 Vivace
???? : H 221 Allegretto
???? : H 222 La nuit est si profonde for voice and orchestra
