= Arthur Honegger discography =

Selected recordings of compositions by Arthur Honegger

Work	Year	Conductor	Orchestra	Label(s)	References
Symphony No. 1		Charles Dutoit	Bavarian Radio Symphony Orchestra	Apex (USA)	
Symphony No. 1	2012	Dennis Russell Davies	Basel Symphony Orchestra	Sinfonieorchester Basel	
Symphony No. 2		Paul Sacher	Basel Symphony Orchestra		
Symphony No. 2	1952	Charles Münch	Boston Symphony Orchestra	RCA Gold Seal	
Symphony No. 2	1967	Charles Münch	Orchestre de Paris		
Symphony No. 2	1969	Herbert von Karajan	Berlin Philharmonic Orchestra	DG Originals	
Symphony No. 2	1993	Gerard Schwarz	Seattle Symphony	Delos	
Symphony No. 2	2014	Dennis Russell Davies	Basel Symphony Orchestra	Sinfonieorchester Basel	
Symphony No. 3	1969	Herbert von Karajan	Berlin Philharmonic Orchestra	DG Originals	
Symphony No. 3	1947	Arthur Honegger	unknown orchestra	French Decca A-15004 to A-15007	
Symphony No. 3		Yevgeny Mravinsky	Leningrad Philharmonic Orchestra		
Symphony No. 3		Ernest Ansermet	Bavarian Radio Symphony Orchestra		
Symphony No. 3		Louis de Froment	Luxembourg Philharmonic Orchestra		
Symphony No. 3	2006	Mariss Jansons	Concertgebouw Orchestra	RCO Live	
Symphony No. 3	2012	Dennis Russell Davies	Basel Symphony Orchestra	Sinfonieorchester Basel	
Symphony No. 4		Charles Münch	Orchestra of the ORTF		
Symphony No. 4	2014	Dennis Russell Davies	Basel Symphony Orchestra	Sinfonieorchester Basel	
Symphony No. 5	1952	Charles Münch	Boston Symphony Orchestra	RCA Gold Seal	
Symphony No. 5	1951	Ernest Ansermet	Vienna Philharmonic Orchestra	Andante	
Symphonies (all)	1960–86	Serge Baudo	Czech Philharmonic Orchestra	Supraphon	
Symphonies (all)	1984–86	Charles Dutoit	Bavarian Radio Symphony Orchestra	Teldec Ultima; Erato; ECD	
Symphonies (all)	2003	Michel Plasson	Orchestre du Capitole de Toulouse	Emi Classics	
Pacific 231	1962	Leonard Bernstein	New York Philharmonic Orchestra	Sony Masterworks	
Pacific 231	1971	Jean Martinon	Orchestre National de l'ORTF	Emi Classics	
Pacific 231	1991	Michel Plasson	Orchestre du Capitole de Toulouse	Deutsche Grammophon	
Pacific 231	2003	Michel Plasson	Orchestre du Capitole de Toulouse	Emi Classics	
Rugby	1962	Leonard Bernstein	New York Philharmonic Orchestra	Sony Masterworks	
Rugby	1971	Jean Martinon	Orchestre National de l'ORTF	Emi Classics	
Rugby	1991	Michel Plasson	Orchestre du Capitole de Toulouse	Deutsche Grammophon	
Symphonic Movement No. 3		Wilhelm Furtwängler	Berlin Philharmonic Orchestra	Maestro History	
Pastorale d'été	1934	Arthur Honegger		EMI Classics	
Pastorale d'été	1971	Jean Martinon	Orchestre National de l'ORTF	Emi Classics	
Pastorale d'été	1991	Michel Plasson	Orchestre du Capitole de Toulouse	Deutsche Grammophon	
Cello Concerto	1934	Arthur Honegger	Orchestre de la Société des Concerts du Conservatoire	EMI Classics	
Monopartita	1991	Marius Constant	Monte Carlo Philharmonic Orchestra	Warner Apex; Erato	
Le chant de Nigamon	1991	Marius Constant	Monte Carlo Philharmonic Orchestra	Warner Apex; Erato	
Prelude, Fugue and Postlude	1991	Marius Constant	Monte Carlo Philharmonic Orchestra	Warner Apex; Erato	
Horace victorieux	1991	Michel Plasson	Orchestre du Capitole de Toulouse	Deutsche Grammophon	
Jeanne d'Arc au Bûcher	1989	Seiji Ozawa	Orchestre National de France	Deutsche Grammophon	
Jeanne d'Arc au Bûcher	2019	Stéphane Denève	Concertgebouw Orchestra	RCO Live	
Le Roi David		Charles Dutoit	Bavarian Radio Symphony Orchestra		
Le Roi David		Michel Piquemal	Orchestre de la Cité, Ile de France Regional Chorus	Naxos (USA)	
Une cantate de Noël	1962	Ernest Ansermet	Orchestre de la Suisse Romande	Decca	
Une cantate de Noël	1971	Jean Martinon	Orchestre National de l'ORTF	Emi Classics	
The Tempest (prelude)	1991	Michel Plasson	Orchestre du Capitole de Toulouse	Deutsche Grammophon	
The Tempest (prelude)	1991	Marius Constant	Monte Carlo Philharmonic Orchestra	Warner Apex; Erato	
Chamber music	1992		Ludwig String Quartet + soloists	Timpani	
Les Misérables (1934 film score)		Adriano	Slovak Radio Symphony	Naxos	
Mermoz: 2 suites	1991	Michel Plasson	Orchestre du Capitole de Toulouse	Deutsche Grammophon	
Napoleon: Les ombres	1991	Marius Constant	Monte Carlo Philharmonic Orchestra	Warner Apex; Erato	
Phaedra: 3 movements	1991	Marius Constant	Monte Carlo Philharmonic Orchestra	Warner Apex; Erato	
Suite Archaïque	1961	Robert Whitney	Louisville Orchestra	Louisville	
