= Arthur Honegger =

Swiss composer (1892–1955)

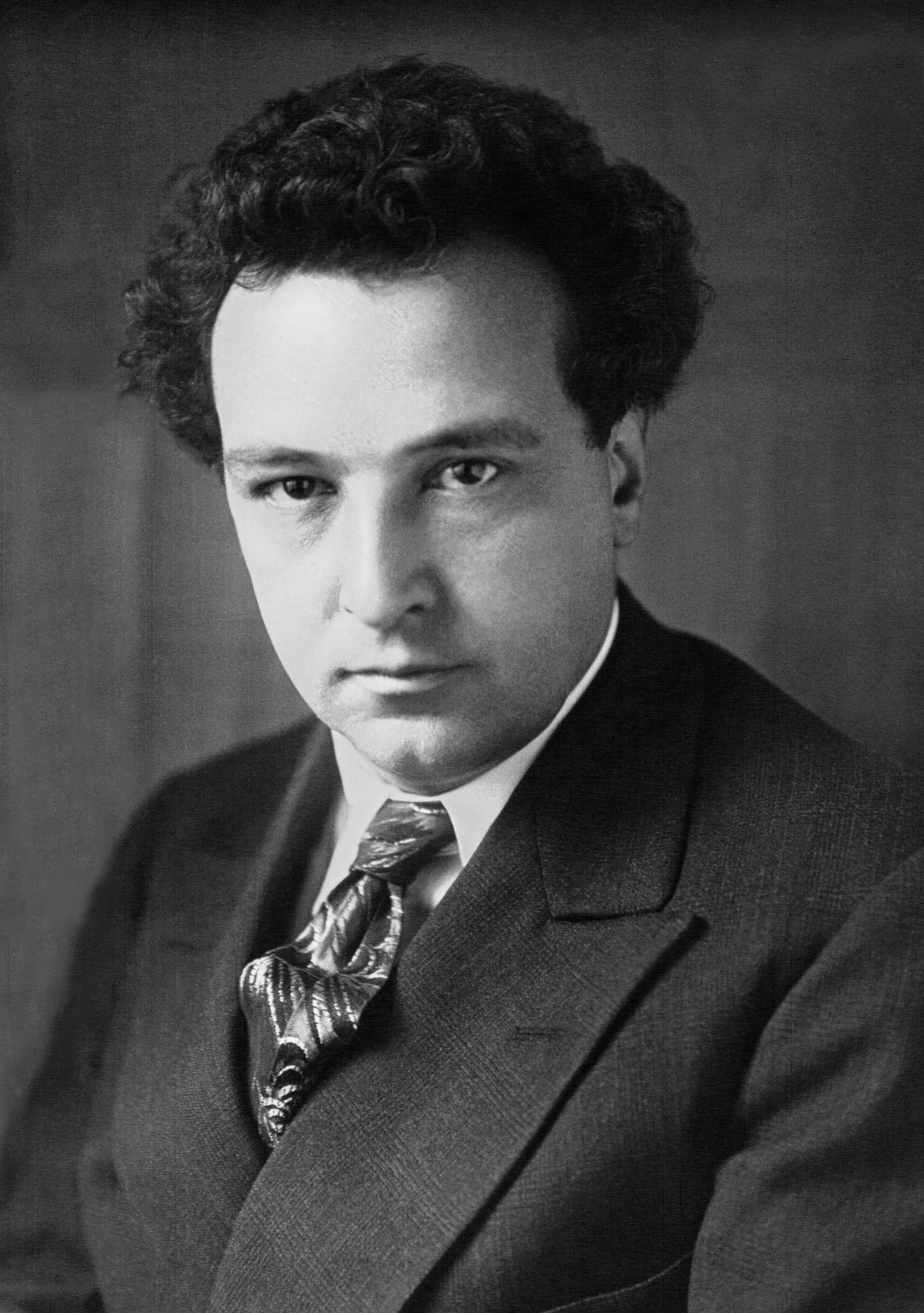
- Honegger in 1928

Background information
- Born: Oscar-Arthur Honegger; 10 March 1892; Le Havre, France
- Died: 27 November 1955 (aged 63) Paris, France
- Education: Zurich University of the Arts, Paris Conservatoire
- Genres: Opera; operetta; classical; ballet; film score
- Occupation: Composer
- Formerly of: Les Six

Oscar-Arthur Honegger (French: [aʁtyʁ ɔnɛɡɛʁ]; 10 March 1892 – 27 November 1955) was a Swiss composer who was born in France and lived a large part of his life in Paris.

Honegger was a member of Les Six. For musicologist Halbreich, Jeanne d'Arc au bûcher is "more even than Le Roi David or Pacific 231, his most universally popular work".

== Biography ==
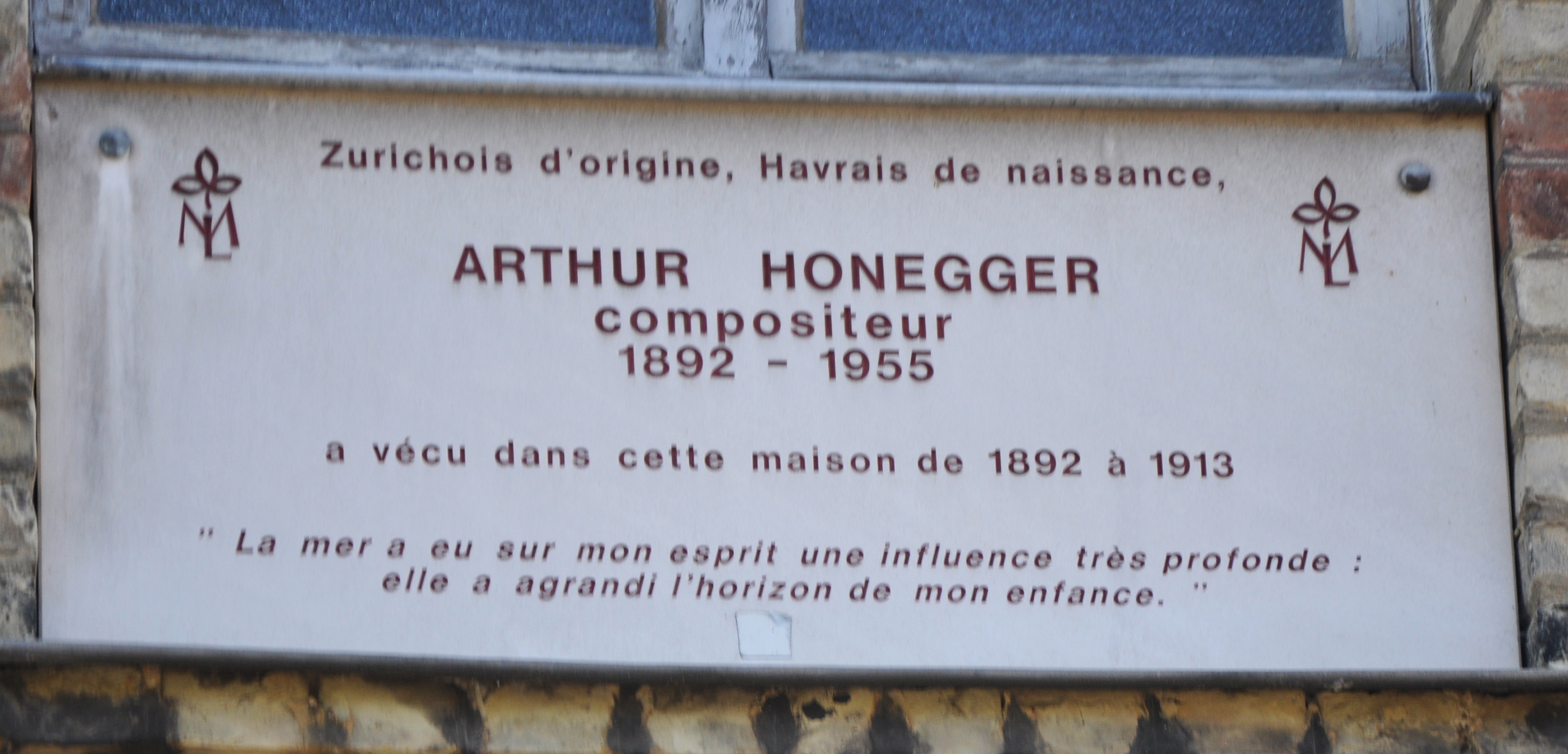
Plaque at the Honegger home in Le Havre

Born Oscar-Arthur Honegger (the first name was never used) to Swiss parents in Le Havre, France, he initially studied harmony with Robert-Charles Martin (to whom he dedicated his first published work) and violin in Le Havre.

He then moved to Switzerland, where he spent two years (September 1909 – June 1911) at the Zurich Conservatory being taught by Lothar Kempter and Friedrich Hegar. In 1911, he enrolled in the Paris Conservatoire from 1911 to 1918 (except for a brief period during the winter of 1914–1915, when he was mobilised in Switzerland), studying with Charles-Marie Widor, Lucien Capet, André Gédalge and Vincent d'Indy.

Gédalge encouraged him to compose and Honegger announced his decision to become a composer in a letter to his parents dated 28 April 1915. He then praised his teacher Gédalge and his Traité de la fugue (1904), "the most complete work ever written on the subject". Gédalge taught his pupils the craft while respecting their ideas and personalities, he went on, and added that while some teachers trained their pupils well to succeed in competitions, "the most advanced musicians in terms of modern spirit were Gédalge's pupils".

Among his notable early works are his Six Poèmes d'Apollinaire (poems from Alcools), premiered in 1916 and 1918; 'Hommage à Ravel' from the Trois pièces pour piano (1915); Quatre Poèmes H. 7 (1914–1916); Trois Poèmes de Paul Fort (1916); his very Debussian Prélude pour Aglavaine et Sélysette (inspired by Maurice Maeterlinck's play: the prelude was premiered at the orchestral class in 1917, with a public premiere in 1920); Le Dit des Jeux du monde, commissioned in April 1918 by the Belgian poet Paul Méral, premiered by Walther Straram at Jane Bathori's Théâtre du Vieux-Colombier, in December 1918 (Composed of thirteen short pieces that at times evoke Schönberg, this work dedicated to Fernand Ochsé, "caused a scandal comparable in every way to those of The Rite of Spring or of Parade"); Le Chant de Nigamon (1918, public premiere by the Orchestre Pasdeloup in 1920: his first symphonic piece, inspired by Gustave Aimard's adventure novel Le Souriquet with Native American themes (thanks to Julien Tiersot's Notes d'ethnographie musicale); his first String Quartet, "the composer's first fully accomplished masterpiece" (Halbreich 1992, p. 311) premiered in 1919 by the Quatuor Capelle; music for Vérité ? Mensonge ?, a ballet by André Hellé: four out of the ten tableaux were premiered at the Salon d'automne, on 25 November 1920, with Yvonne Daunt; and in 1920–1921 Pastorale d'été premiered by Vladimir Golschmann.

=== Musical friendships ===
While at the conservatoire, Honegger befriended Jacques Ibert, then Milhaud, and then met Germaine Tailleferre and later Georges Auric as well as the pianist Andrée Vaurabourg. The first concert of the Nouveaux Jeunes took place at the Théâtre du Vieux-Colombier on 15 January 1918: Jane Bathori and Andrée Vaurabourg gave the Six Poèmes d'Apollinaire (now complete for the first time). Roland-Manuel was present, Halbreich notes that he might well have been one of the Six, as well as Jacques Ibert. Those who would later be known as "Les Six" wanted to create a fresh, French style of composition. Honegger was far from blending in with the group as his style was somewhat more serious ("I don't have a cult for street fairs or the music-hall", he wrote in a letter to Paul Landormy) and complex. Nevertheless, this association was important in establishing his reputation in the Parisian music scene. Honegger collaborated with the other members of Les Six only in 1920 (with a short 'Sarabande' for L'Album des Six), and 1921 (with a 'Marche funèbre' for Les mariés de la tour Eiffel, and finally in 1952 (with a 'Toccata' for La Guirlande de Campra).

=== 1920s ===
Honegger's Sonata for cello and piano H. 32 composed in 1920 was premiered in 1921 by Diran Alexanian and Andrée Varabourg; Halbreich says that it "should be part of every cellist's repertoire" (Halbreich 1992, p. 330). He also wrote Danse de la chèvre (1921), which has become a staple in the flute repertoire. The work is dedicated to René Le Roy and written for solo flute.

Loie Fuller danced on three of the dances of Le Dit des Jeux du monde early in 1921. Also in 1921 Ernest Ansermet conducted the avant-garde music of the ballet-pantomime Horace victorieux in Lausanne (in a concert version). It evokes the fight of the Horatii and Curiatii and concludes with Camilla's death. Still in 1921, René Morax commissioned Honegger to write Le Roi David: he completed his score in two months, and on 11 June the 'dramatic psalm' (written as incidental music) was triumphantly received. On 13 March 1924, Honegger shot to fame when the French version re-orchestrated for large orchestra of Le Roi David was performed in Paris under the baton of Robert Siohan. It is still in the choral repertoire. "Making Le Roi David into an oratorio [or a 'psaume symphonique'] is one of the key events in the musical life of the first half of the 20th century," musicologist Mathieu Ferey wrote in the booklet for the recording of Le roi David by Daniel Reuss (Mirare). In this version, the spoken voices are replaced by a narrator, but the instrumentation remains the same: the work is written for the seventeen instruments available at the Théâtre du Jorat: no strings except for a double bass, winds, percussion, piano, harmonium and celesta. It was conducted by Georges Martin Witkowski in Lyon in January 1923 and is still played and recorded today.

Honegger's works were played in the US from 1921 when Rudolph Ganz directed Horace and Pastorale d'été.

In 1922, Honegger became one of the first major composers (after Camille Saint-Saëns) to write music specifically for films. His score (of which only the 'Ouverture' remains) for the silent film "La Roue" (1923) by Abel Gance marked the beginning of his long involvement with film music. 1922 He had met Gance through the French writer Ricciotto Canudo, an advocate of cinema as the "Seventh Art". He worked for Gance again in 1927 for Napoleon and in 1943 for Captain Fracasse.

1922 is also the year Honegger lost his mother (in February) and father (in September).

In 1923, Honegger composed a short piece which was to become one of his most often recorded works: Pacific 231, for the Concerts Koussevitzky at the Opéra de Paris in May 1924 – although Serge Koussevitzky was already music director of the Boston Symphony Orchestra. The music captures the interest of the casual music lover as it mimics the sounds and motion of a steam locomotive – Honegger said "I have always loved locomotives passionately. For me they are living creatures…" but for the composer, the main point was to "giv[e] the impression of a mathematical acceleration of rhythm, while the movement itself slows down.""

Chanson de Ronsard H.54 (on Pierre de Ronsard's 'Plus tu connais que je brûle pour toi', composed to mark the 450th anniversary of the poet's birth, exists in a version for voice and piano (premiered by Claire Croiza, 1924), and above all for voice, flute and string quartet (Régine de Lormoy, 1925).

Another significant work was "Judith" for René Morax's play, which continued his interest in religious themes. It was premiered as a biblical drama in December 1924 or January 1925 at the Théâtre du Jorat, then reworked as an "opéra sérieux" (1926, Monte-Carlo), and finally became an oratorio (1927, Rotterdam). It is dedicated to Claire Croiza (the mother of his son Jean-Claude, 1926–2003) who sang the part of Judith in the first version. Halbreich (p. 550) says that "Judith is full of marvellous, inspired music although the whole piece is imperfect."

In 1922, Honegger had written a very brief piece of incidental music for Jean Cocteau's Antigone based on the tragedy by Sophocles. The composer then developed it between 1924 and 1927 for the opera Antigone which premiered on 28 December 1927 at the Théâtre Royal de la Monnaie under Maurice Corneil de Thoran's baton, with sets designed by Pablo Picasso and costumes by Coco Chanel. It is dedicated to "Vaura": Andrée Vaurabourg and is, according to Halbreich "the most arduous and least accessible of Honegger's works", but according to Lacombe, "the most technically accomplished" and "Honegger's most important opera".

In 1926, he married Andrée Vaurabourg, a pianist and fellow student at the Paris Conservatoire, on the condition that they live in separate apartments because he required solitude for composing. Andrée lived with her mother, and Honegger visited them for lunch every day. They lived apart for the duration of their marriage, with the exception of one year from 1935 to 1936 following Vaurabourg's injury in a car accident, and the last year of Honegger's life, when he was not well enough to live alone. They had one daughter, Pascale, born in 1932.

In 1928 Honegger composed a new symphonic movement called "Rugby," inspired by the sport. The music reflects "the attacks and counter-attacks of the game, the rhythm and colour of a match at the Colombe stadium", according to the composer himself. On November 22, 1928, at the Palais Garnier under the direction of Walther Straram, Ida Rubinstein's Company premiered Les Noces de Psyché et de l'Amour, choreographed by Nijinska to music by Bach (Prelude and Fugue in C Major, BWV 545) orchestrated by Honegger. Two more choreographic entertainments were premiered that night : La Bien-aimée, adapted from themes by Schubert and Liszt by Darius Milhaud; and Boléro, with original music by Maurice Ravel.

La Tempête, incidental music for Shakespeare's play, was composed between 1923 and 1929 and premiered in 1929.

In December 1930, at the Théâtre des Bouffes-Parisiens, the first of Honegger's three operettas, Les Aventures du roi Pausole, revealing a Honegger full of humour, was a huge success with no less than 800 performances according to Halbreich (p. 671) The composer admitted to having three models here: Mozart, Chabrier and Messager (p. 671). In 1932 Les Cris du monde, an oratorio on a text by René Bizet (1887–1947) inspired (loosely) by John Keats' sonnet 'To Solitude', expressed Honegger's great pessimism : it was a warning against "everything that contributes to the loss of the soul and the death of the individual" including pollution, noise, mass culture, etc.

=== First symphony (1930) ===
The Symphony No. 1 composed in 1929–30, was premiered in Boston and then in Paris in 1931. It is described by Harry Halbreich as "written in a language that is rougher and less spare than the following ones, despite a perfectly mastered form, at the crossroads of youth and maturity". Mouvement symphonique No 3 (composed in 1932–1933) was premiered in March 1933 by those who commissioned it: Wilhelm Furtwängler and the Berlin Philharmonic. G. K. Spratt thought it was his best symphonic piece so far.

=== Patronage and collaborations ===
From 1925 onwards (L'Impératrice aux rochers with very Fauréan passages), the patron Ida Rubinstein (a former dancer with the Ballets Russes) financed several works by Honegger, who collaborated with Paul Valéry for Amphion (1931), as well as the ballet Sémiramis (1934), created by Ida Rubinstein at the Opéra. The former is best remembered for the composer's Prelude, Fugue et Postlude (first performed in 1948).

Honegger also collaborated with Serge Lifar for Icare (1935) for percussion and double bass, then for Le Cantique des cantiques, premiered in 1938. On this occasion the choreographer published his manifesto La Danse et la Musique (Revue Musicale, March 1938) in which he claimed the pre-eminence of dancers and choreographers in the conception of ballets.

L'Aiglon, drame lyrique (on a libretto by Henri Cain based on Edmond Rostand's 1900 play, L'Aiglon"), about the life of Napoleon II, was written in collaboration with Jacques Ibert in 1936 and premiered in 1937. Kent Nagano released a good CD recording of it in 2016. With the same composer (Ibert) Honegger wrote the operetta Les Petites Cardinal, in the same vein as Le Roi Pausole (Bouffes-Parisiens, 1938). He also wrote a very short piano piece with an original title in English, Scenic Railway in 1937, premiered in 1938. It was his contribution to a collaborative work, Parc d'Attractions – Expo. 1937: Hommage à Marguerite Long.

=== Film scores ===
He remained active in the field of film music, notably with scores for Raymond Bernard's "Les Misérables" (1934), Pierre Chenal's Crime and Punishment; Les Mutinés de l'Elseneur and Anatole Litvak's Mayerling (1936 film), in collaboration with Maurice Jaubert (1936); and Pygmalion (1938). In 1939, the film score for Love Cavalcade was written partly by Milhaud (La cheminée du roi René is a suite drawn from his score) and partly by Honegger (his O Salutaris for voice, piano and organ or just organ (premiered in 1943) is derived from this work).

=== Late 1930s ===
The Quartet n° 3, "unquestionably the pinnacle of his chamber music" for Jacques Tchamkerten was also composed in 1936–37; it was premiered in October 1937 by the Pro Arte Quartet. It had been commissioned by Elizabeth Sprague Coolidge. After this work, Honegger stopped writing chamber music, with only a few exceptions.

On a new commission from Ida Rubinstein he wrote a "dramatic oratorio", Jeanne d'Arc au bûcher, to a libretto by Paul Claudel, premiered by Paul Sacher in Basel in 1938. It is thought of as one of his finest works, blending spoken word, music, and choral elements to tell the story of Joan of Arc. It remains one of his most frequently performed compositions. There is a DVD version recorded by Don Kent.

For Le Chant du Monde, he harmonized several French folk songs recorded under Désormière's direction: La femme du marin (CdM 513, May 1938) and Les trois princesses au pommier doux (CdM 520, October 1938) and two of his works were recorded, again by Désormière: Jeunesse recorded by the Chorale de la jeunesse, with an orchestra directed by Roger Désormière (CdM 501, fév 1938) and Petite suite en trois parties.

In 1932, Honegger published "Pour prendre congé", an article in which he complained that his music was not understood, he felt he was on a dead end. When Hitler came to power, Honegger's works were banned (in Germany and later in the countries that were annexed). In 1934, Vaura was seriously injured a car accident – Honegger escaped without serious injury. Above all, the political climate in Europe was increasingly tense. In 1937, Honegger had written Jeunesse for the Fédération musicale populaire: it was a song celebrating the singing tomorrows after the success of the Front Populaire. The lyrics were by Paul Vaillant-Couturier, a journalist at L'Humanité who tried to alert people to the realities of Hitler's regime and founded the first Maison de la culture (which included the Fédération musicale populaire) in France. Honegger took a clear stand against the Nazi regime in the June 1939 issue of the magazine Clarté: "He who creates cannot reconcile his dignity as an artist with the enslavement that fascism imposes". In 1931 Honegger, like many musicians and intellectuals, had already expressed his support for the manifesto for peace published in Notre temps which concluded with: "It is therefore important that this country [France], made so rich by its past achievements, should dare to proclaim that the new Europe and a Franco-German entente, which is its keystone, can only arise from agreements freely entered into by their pacified populations."

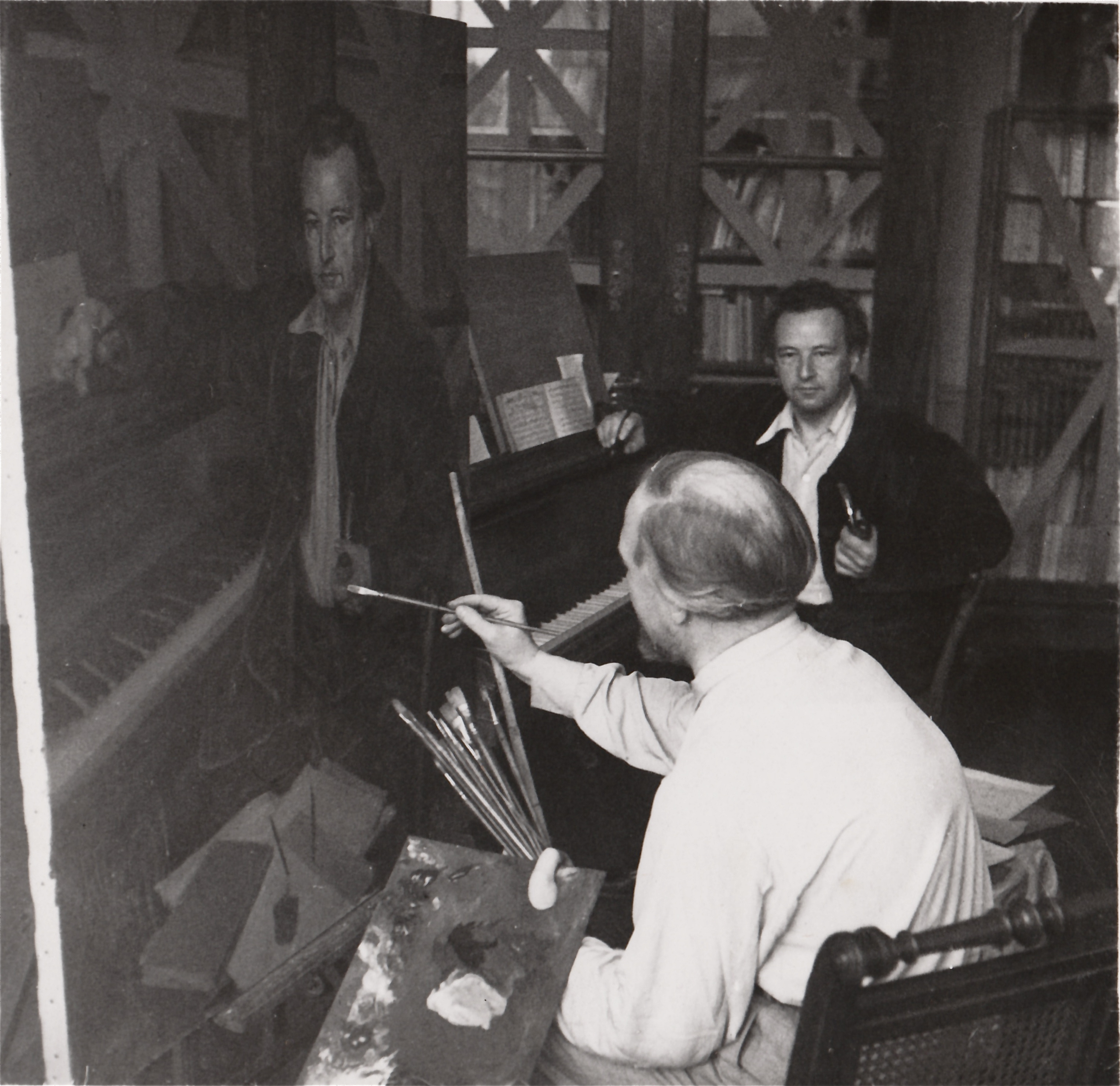
Arthur Honegger, as portrayed by Serge Ivanoff, Paris, 1944

=== World War II ===
During World War II, Honegger, although he was Swiss, chose to remain in Paris, which was under Nazi occupation from 14 June 1940 to 24 August 1944. Honegger initially fled south, but returned to Paris at the end of October 1940. Nevertheless, he was allowed to continue his work without too much interference and even to travel abroad several times during the war years, mostly to conduct his music – only twice to Switzerland, and without his family.

In March 1940, in Basel, Sacher premiered the sacred oratorio La Danse des morts, whose libretto was by Paul Claudel (and based on the Bible), and it was a great success. to a libretto by Robert Favre Le Bret. The music used popular Swiss and Scottish themes. It featured Yvette Chauviré and Serge Peretti, dancer and choreographer. The press widely echoed it, and the critic of L'Epoque, Maurice Brillant wrote: "This is the first novelty given by the Opéra since the Liberation: it is worthy of the honour.". Honegger then produced a concert suite from it, Jour de Fête suisse.

Honegger again returned to ballet music by composing two tableaux (I and IV) of the ballet Chota Roustaveli on Nikolai Evreinov's libretto based on the poem by the great Georgian poet Shota Rustaveli (c. 1160 – after c. 1220), The Knight in the Panther's Skin, with Alexander Tcherepnin (act II) and Tibor Harsányi (act III), with a rhythmic base provided by Serge Lifar (Monte-Carlo, May 1946).

He also composed some film music, for Raymond Bernard's Un ami viendra ce soir (released in 1946): Souvenir de Chopin and Chant de la Délivrance are part of this score (although the latter had been composed earlier). His other film score was for Yves Allégret's Les démons de l'aube (1946), written in collaboration with his friend Arthur Hoérée.

1946 was marked by numerous trips in France and Europe, including during his holidays in Switzerland. In May, Claire Croiza died. In June, Honegger began his fourth symphony. In November he began giving classes at the École Normale de Musique de Paris, where his students included Yves Ramette.

He composed several pieces of incidental music (Prométhée for Aeschylus' Prometheus Bound; Hamlet for a performance of the play in André Gide's new translation) and a score for Christian-Jaque's Un revenant. He also wrote a score for four ondes Martenot for Sortilèges, a ballet based on a storyline by Leyla Bedir Khan, first performed in summer 1946 at the Comédie des Champs-Elysées, but it is unfortunately lost.

=== The Delights of Basel ===
His most important work, though, was that on his Symphony No. 4, subtitled "Deliciae basilienses" ("The Delights of Basel") and dedicated to his friend Paul Sacher. It is "a kind of Pastoral Symphony that pays tribute both to the beautiful city of Basel, bathed by the Rhine and where life is good, and to the friendship that bound the Swiss composer to the patron and conductor Paul Sacher". Completed in October, it was premiered by the dedicatee, in Basel, in January 1947. At the end of the second movement, the solo horn quotes Franz Abt's setting of Basel-born Johann Peter Hebel's poem "Z'Basel, a mim Rhi", and two minutes before the end of the third movement Honegger describes a carnival march: this is an evocation of Guggenmusik, typical brass bands of German-speaking Switzerland using the piccolo and the Basel drum, before a phrase full of nostalgia followed by a brief mocking farewell.

There was one more (short) piece written in December: Mimaamaquim, for voice (originally for Madeleine Martinetti's deep contralto voice) and piano. It was orchestrated in June 1947. According to Halbreich, it is (at least the version with orchestra) "one of the peaks of his work" in which he finds "the typical intonations of synagogue chant".

During the first months of 1947, Honegger was bursting with activity as his works were given in concert all over Europe. In April 1947, he found the time to compose a competition piece, Intrada, for trumpet and piano. In June he wrote some incidental music, Œdipe, for Sophocles' Oedipus Rex, which was premiered in December 1947.

=== America ===
Honegger was then invited by Serge Koussevitzky at the beginning of July to give summer courses at the Tanglewood Music Center, following which he planned to go on tour throughout the US, then to Mexico and South America, where he was well-known thanks to Jane Bathori, who had made Le roi David and Judith known. A fortnight after he arrived, however, he suffered a heart attack that left him bedridden. A month later he suffered a massive heart attack. The composer nevertheless managed to recover and he returned to Paris on 15 November. He did not return to work until spring 1948.

=== Late 1940s ===
In the spring of 1948, Honegger wrote Prélude, Fugue, Postlude, a suite after Amphion, premiered in November by Ansermet, then left for his first water cure at Bagnoles-de-l'Orne where he worked a little. Next came the Concerto da camera for flute, English horn and strings, finished in October 1948 and premiered in 1949, an "exquisite masterpiece". In October, he wrote incidental music (the score of which is lost) for Albert Camus's play The State of Siege , directed by Jean-Louis Barrault. In November, in Genoa, he resumed his conducting career, which he was to give up a year later (except in 1951 when he conducted the Orchestre National De La Radiodiffusion Française in Le Roi David in a recording studio, for Ducretet Thomson).

In June 1949, he completed a score for a final radio play in collaboration with Aguet, Saint-François d'Assise, whose broadcast was announced by Le Monde: "... this musico-literary radio work, specially noticed and recommended by the Premio Italia panel and premiered by Radio-Lausanne in June 1949, will be transmitted live from Lausanne by the national program this evening, Friday 2 December at 9 pm. Its performance will feature the Orchestre de la Suisse Romande, conducted by Ernest Ansermet, the Montreux choir and the Radio-théâtre de Lausanne troupe". This is, for Halbreich, "the most important and the most beautiful" of his collaborations with Aguet.

In 1949, he resumed his frenetic pace, leaving him time to compose only two new radio plays: Marche contre la mort, by Antoine de Saint-Exupéry, in tribute to Henri Guillaumet, whose plane was shot down on 27 November 1940, and Tête d'or, adapted from Claudel's play which he completed in January 1950.

=== Health problems ===
By 1950, his health had deteriorated again. Nevertheless, he wrote a score for a documentary film, Bourdelle (about the sculptor, obviously), by René Lucot; another score for the documentary Paul Claudel, Paul Claudel's interview with Jean Amrouche filmed by André Gillet; and above all a new symphony, and a suite.

The Symphonie n° 5, written from August to December, premiered in 1951, is subtitled "Di tre re" (which refers to the three D notes at the end of each movement). It is marked by a stark and somber tone, reflecting the author's belief that the end of civilization was near: the work ends with a vision of nothingness.

On 18 December, "Jeanne d'Arc au Bûcher" finally entered the repertoire of the Paris Opera, under the direction of Louis Fourestier. The event was once again hailed by Le Monde: "Jeanne au bûcher, in the stage version and in French, achieved in December 1950 one of the greatest, most spontaneous successes ever seen at this theatre".

In the first quarter of 1951, despite his increasingly failing health, Honegger still managed to compose an important orchestral piece, Monopartita, followed, at the end of the year, by two very short pieces for La rédemption de François Villon, a radio play by José Bruyr as well as his Toccata sur un thème de Campra, his contribution to La Guirlande de Campra, as well as a film score for Georges Rony's documentary La tour de Babel (1951) with the collaboration of Tibor Harsányi and Arthur Hoérée.

At the suggestion of Henri Büsser, Florent Schmitt and J.-G. Domergue, he was elected foreign associate member of the music section of the Académie des Beaux-Arts on 3 April 1952.

In April 1952, he completed a final stage score for Oedipus Rex, this time in Thierry Maulnier's translation, premiered at the Comédie-Française in May.

At the end of 1952, despite his health problems, he began to reorganise work he had done for an aborted Passion de Selzach project. This became A Christmas Cantata, premiered in Basel by his friend Sacher in December. The French premiere, on 10 January 1954, was celebrated in Le Monde by René Dumesnil.

After a long stay in Switzerland, he managed to return to Paris in June 1954, when "Jeanne d'Arc au Bûcher" was about to be revived at the Opéra, directed by Roberto Rossellini and starring Ingrid Bergman: this was the version filmed in 1956.

In December 1954, he was made a "Grand Officier de la Légion d'honneur".

Early 1955 saw the recording of Arthur Honegger vous parle et présente son œuvre (Honegger speaks to you and presents his work; see on YouTube, in French).

=== Death ===
Arthur Honegger died in his studio, 71 boulevard de Clichy, on 27 November 1955. His funeral took place on 2 December 1955 at the Oratoire du Louvre, in the presence of a representative of French President René Coty and of Elisabeth, Queen of the Belgians. The eulogy was delivered by Pastor Fritz Münch, director of the Strasbourg Conservatory and brother of friend Charles Münch, to the sound of the "lamento" from the Danse des morts and the "Alleluia' from Le Roi David. During the cremation at Père Lachaise Cemetery, several personalities made speeches, including Jean Cocteau. The urn passed between a hedge of Republican Guards presenting arms (although he remained a Swiss national and never took French citizenship), and was then taken to Saint-Vincent Cemetery, in the Montmartre district, where it is now placed under a simple tombstone.

The Paris Opéra paid tribute to him on 18 December 1955 with the Symphonie n°3 conducted by Louis Fourestier, followed by Jeanne au Bûcher, with Claude Nollier, creator of the role. In November 1956, his friends Georges Tzipine, Fernand Oubradous and Arthur Hoérée organized a series of concerts featuring works by Honegger, and the Quintet No. 4 for 2 violins, viola and 2 cellos, Op. 350, composed by his friend Darius Milhaud and dedicated to Honegger. In 1962, Poulenc, too, dedicated "à la mémoire de Arthur Honegger" one of the last pieces he completed, his Clarinet Sonata.

=== Early championing ===
Many of Honegger's works were championed by his longtime friend Georges Tzipine, who conducted the premiere recordings of some of them (Cris du Monde, Nicolas de Flüe).

Honegger's discography is very extensive.

== Style ==
The principal elements of Honegger's style are Bachian counterpoint, driving rhythms, melodic amplitude, highly coloristic harmonies, an impressionistic use of orchestral sonorities, and a concern for formal architecture. His style is weightier and more solemn than that of his colleagues in Les Six. Far from reacting against German romanticism as the other members of Les Six did, Honegger's mature works show evidence of a distinct influence by it. "I place great importance on musical architecture", he wrote,

which I would never want to see sacrificed for literary or pictorial reasons. I have a perhaps exaggerated tendency to seek polyphonic complexity. My great model is J. S. Bach. I am not aiming, as some anti-impressionist composers do, for a return to harmonic simplicity. On the contrary, I believe we should use the harmonic materials developed by the school that preceded us, but in a different way—as a base for lines and rhythms. Bach makes use of the elements of tonal harmony, just as I wish to make use of modern harmonic overlays. I do not subscribe to the cult of the Music Hall or of the street fair; on the contrary, I am committed to chamber music and symphonic music in their most serious and austere aspects).

Despite the differences in their styles, he and fellow Les Six member Darius Milhaud were close friends, having studied together at the Paris Conservatoire (as well as Tailleferre). Milhaud dedicated his fourth string quintet to Honegger's memory, while Francis Poulenc similarly dedicated his Clarinet Sonata.

"The work of composer Arthur Honegger stands out for its great diversity, ranging from tonality to atonality, without forgetting polytonality, using all registers, and respecting both the achievements of the past and the contributions of his contemporaries… he is not classifiable in any school.". This diversity in reality reflects an artistic journey whose coherence comes from the deep conviction that music is a true means of communication with the public. Halbreich notes that after Antigone, "The need to communicate took precedence over all others, and in his freely chosen mission as "musician in the city of men" Honegger considered the maintenance of an esoteric and avant-garde language as a narcissistic luxury contrary to his humanist demands, even if the aesthetes of art for art's sake suffered and disapproved of his choice. His only subsequent attempt at opera, L'Aiglon, was aimed at the immediate (and, it was accepted, perhaps ephemeral) approval of a vast popular audience, not that of a hypothetical and elitist posterity". It is for this reason that Honegger often aspired to a music free from too much formalism, too much seduction, and above all, in general, from musical habits. All his life he feared the danger of cultural habits, of different forms of collective consciousness (Cris du monde, 1931, the subject of which is "the revolt of the individual against the crowd that crushes him" according to Honegger, Plans, December 1931). This fear was justified by his ideology of authentic and above all meaningful music, capable of carrying a message, sometimes even a philosophical one as in his Symphony No. 3, 1945, which, according to the composer, "musically depicts the struggle in the heart of man between abandonment to the blind forces that enslave him and the instinct for happiness, the love of peace, the feeling of divine refuge".

The diversity of his works is therefore easy to understand: what each of them had to say in a new way required, in his eyes, a new language. He thus explored different genres and techniques, taking an equal interest in Claude Debussy's or Gabriel Fauré's harmony, Igor Stravinsky's rhythm, Beethovenian form, Arnold Schoenberg's genius – excluding serialism – in Le Dit des Jeux du Monde. He also made use of new instruments, or instruments used in new ways: the bowed instruments invented by Léo Sir in Hymne; the saw in Antigone (1927), tam-tam (Pacific 231 and many other pieces), three saxophones in Jeanne d'Arc au bûcher, a bouteillophone (bottles filled with varying amounts of water) for No. 7 of Dit des Jeux du Monde, a piece for solo percussion; and even electronic instruments such as the ondes Martenot (in Jeanne d'Arc au bûcher, played by Maurice Martenot himself at the premiere in 1938, but already used in films such as Berthold Bartosch's L'Idée, 1934).

The apparent simplicity of some passages of his music masks the work he did on each passage of his major works in the sense of objectivity, i.e. the strictly musical coherence of the piece: everything depends on it, including the complexity of the techniques, which, according to him, should only be pushed if necessary, as in Horace Victorieux (1921), "his most radical and daring masterpiece", or in his symphonies. The complexity and, above all, the interest of his main compositions lies in the work of relative objectivity. He often played on the scope of the subjects he dealt with. He sought to reach a profound and universal dimension of humanity. This is why his religious works (he was a Protestant) go beyond the strict framework of religion to reach a more universal and human dimension. This explains the success of Joan of Arc at the stake, for example. This did not stop him from sometimes being more concerned with reacting to the culture of his time, as in Pacific 231 (1923), for example, where Honegger was nevertheless careful not to fall into the anecdote of noise music.

== Legacy ==
Honegger was pictured on the Swiss twenty franc banknote (eighth series), issued in October 1996 and replaced in 2017.

Honegger's symphonic movement Rugby was recorded with him conducting the Paris Symphony Orchestra in a 1929 electrical recording. Many of Honegger's recordings as conductor of his music have been reissued on CD by Pearl and Dutton.

The ice hockey player Doug Honegger is his grandnephew.

== Notable compositions ==
Danse de la chèvre
Performed by Sarah Bassingthwaite

Opus numbers originate from the complete catalogue by Harry Halbreich. For a longer list of compositions, see List of compositions by Arthur Honegger. For a list of select recordings, see Arthur Honegger discography.

- Orchestral music:

Symphonies:

1930: H 75 First Symphony
1941: H 153 Second Symphony for strings and trumpet in D
1946: H 186 Third Symphony "Symphonie Liturgique"
1946: H 191 Fourth Symphony "Deliciae basilienses" in A
1950: H 202 Fifth Symphony "Di tre re" in D

Symphonic movements:

1923: H 53 Pacific 231 (Symphonic Movement No. 1)
1928: H 67 Rugby (Symphonic Movement No. 2)
1933: H 83 Symphonic Movement No. 3

Concertos:

1924: H 55 Concertino for piano and orchestra in E major
1929: H 72 Cello Concerto in C major
1933: H 71A Prélude, Fugue et Postlude
1948: H 196 Concerto da camera, for flute, English horn and strings

Others:

1917: H 10 Prélude pour Aglavaine et Sélysette
1917: H 16 Le Chant de Nigamon
1920: H 31 Pastorale d'été
1923: H 47 Chant de joie (Song of Joy)
1951: H 204 Monopartita

- Oratorios:

1921: H 37 Le roi David (King David) libretto by René Morax, version for orchestra in 1923
1931: H 71 Amphion
1931: H 77 Cris du Monde
1935: H 99 Jeanne d'Arc au bûcher, libretto by Paul Claudel, version with prologue in 1941
1938: H 131 La danse des morts, (The Dance of the Dead) libretto by Paul Claudel
1939: H 135 Nicolas de Flue (oratorio)
1953: H 212 Une cantate de Noël (A Christmas Cantata)

- Operas:

1903: Philippa, not orchestrated, performed, or published
1904: Sigismond, lost
1907: La Esmeralda, after Victor Hugo's The Hunchback of Notre-Dame, unfinished and unpublished
1918: La mort de sainte Alméenne, libretto by M. Jacob, unpublished and only Interlude orchestrated
1925: Judith, libretto by René Morax, premiered at the Opéra de Monte-Carlo on 13 February 1925
1927: H 65 Antigone, libretto by Jean Cocteau based on Sophocles, premiered at La Monnaie on 28 December 1927

- Operettas:

1925: H 108 L'Aiglon, co-written with Jacques Ibert; libretto for acts 2–4 by H. Cain, after E. Rostand, libretto for acts 1 and 5 by Ibert, Opéra de Monte-Carlo, 10 March 1937
1930: Les aventures du roi Pausole, libretto by A. Willemetz, after P. Louÿs, premiered 12 December 1930, Paris, Bouffes-Parisiens
1931: La belle de Moudon, libretto by René Morax, Mézières, Jorat, Switzerland, 30 May 1931, unpublished
1937: Les petites cardinal, libretto by Willemetz and P. Brach, after L. Halévy, Paris, Bouffes-Parisiens, 13 February 1938

- Ballets:

1918: H 19 Le dit des jeux du monde
1921: H 38 Horace victorieux, symphonie mimée
1922: H 40 Skating-Rink

- Chamber music:

1912: H 3 Violin Sonata No. 0
1914: H 6 Piano Trio (Honegger)
1917: H 13 Rhapsodie (Honegger)
1917: H 15 String Quartet No. 1 in C minor
1918: H 17 Violin Sonata No. 1
1920: H 24 Violin Sonata No. 2
1929: H 28 Viola Sonata
1935: H 103 String Quartet No. 2 in D
1937: H 114 String Quartet No. 3 in E
1945: H 181 Paduana for cello solo
1947: H 193 Intrada for C trumpet and piano

- Piano solo works

1910: H 1Three Pieces (Scherzo, Humoresque, Adagio)
1916: H 8 Toccata and Variation
1915–9: H 23 Three Pieces (Prelude, Homage to Ravel, Danse)
1919–20: H 25 Seven Short Pieces
1920: H 26 Sarabande (for Album de Six)
1923–4: H 52 Le Cahier romand
1928–9: H 69 Hommage à Albert Roussel
1932: H 81 Prelude, Arioso and Fughetta on the name BACH
1941: H 145 Petits Airs sur une basse célèbre
1943–4: H 173 Deux Esquisses pour piano (Two Sketches)

- Melodies

1917: H 12 Six poèmes (Honegger) de Guillaume Apollinaire
1917: H 11 Nature morte (Honegger)

- Organ

1917 H 14 Fugue et Choral (Honegger)

== Audiovisual media ==
- Arthur Honegger is a 40-minute film interview by Georges Rouquier released in 1955.
- Interview for Radio-Lausanne by Evelyne Schlumberger (on Youtube)
- Images filmed for the news broadcast: Presentation of the Legion of Honour; the French news also filmed some footage at the Père Lachaise Cemetery during his funeral.
