= Robert-Charles Martin =

French composer, organist and teacher

Robert-Charles Martin (1877—1949) was a French composer, organist and teacher.

== Life ==
Martin lived in the French port city of Le Havre (Seine-Maritime) where he held the position of organist at the city's church of St Michel. Among his pupils was the composer Arthur Honegger who dedicated his first published work to Martin.

== Works ==
Martin was a prolific composer, particularly of solo keyboard works (for harmonium, organ and piano), chamber music, vocal music, and pedagogical texts. His published works comprise more than 150 items.
