= Symphony No. 3 "Symphonie Liturgique" (Honegger) =

Symphony composed by Arthur Honegger

Symphonie Liturgique
- No. 3
- by Arthur Honegger
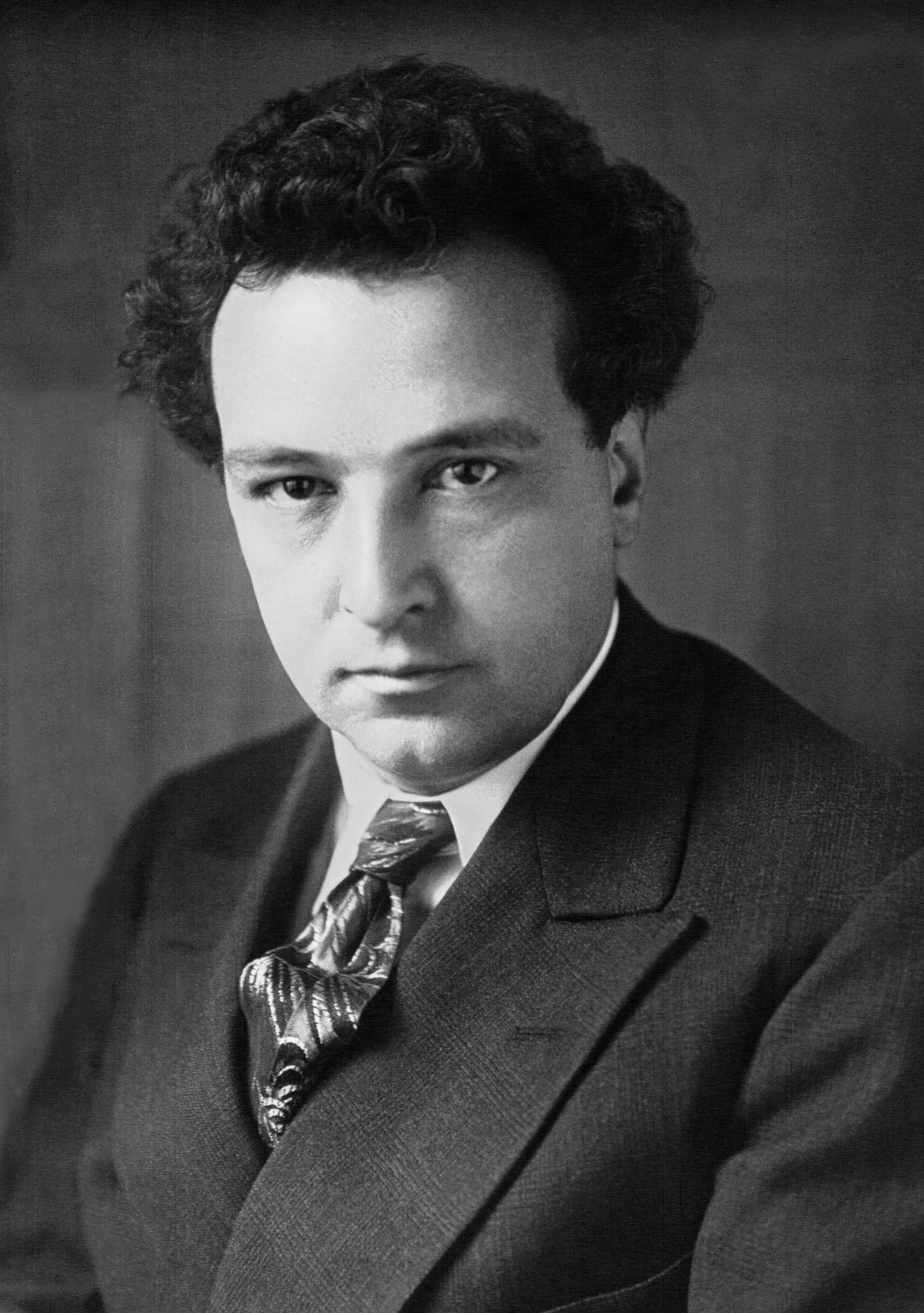
- The composer in 1928
- Based on: Psalm 130 De profundis; Dies irae; Dona nobis pacem
- Composed: 1945–1946
- Dedication: Charles Munch
- Performed: 17 August 1946: Zürich
- Movements: three

Symphonie Liturgique is the third symphony by the Swiss composer Arthur Honegger.

Composed in the aftermath of World War II, it is one of Honegger's best-known works. It is in three movements, each of which (following the symphony's subtitle) is named after a liturgical text. The first movement is named after the Dies irae from the Requiem Mass. It is marked allegro marcato, and has an aggressive, storm-like quality. The slow movement, named De profundis clamavi after Psalm 130, is in contrast meditative and lyrical. The finale, named after the Dona nobis pacem from the Mass, is more episodic, with an insistent, brutal marching rhythm building to a dissonant climax, before a long, lyrical coda concludes the work. A melody resembling the robin song from Jeanne d'Arc au Bûcher, can be heard towards the end of each movement.

Honegger himself wrote an extensive commentary on the work, making explicit the music's connection with the horrors of the War, and the desire for peace.

Written in 1945-46 on a commission from the Foundation Pro Helvetia, Honegger's Third was first performed in Zürich on 17 August 1946 with Charles Munch conducting the Suisse Romande Orchestra. Munch made a live recording of the work in Prague with the Boston Symphony Orchestra in 1956, which has been released by the Multisonic label. The symphony has been performed and recorded many times and was a specialty of Herbert von Karajan, who made a recording of it (with Honegger's Second Symphony) in 1969, which is still widely regarded as one of its finest interpretations.

The Symphonie Liturgique has strong thematic similarities with Benjamin Britten's Sinfonia da Requiem written in 1940, although it is in no sense imitative or a reworking of the earlier piece.
