= Concerto da camera (Honegger) =

Concerto by Arthur Honegger

- Concerto by Arthur Honegger
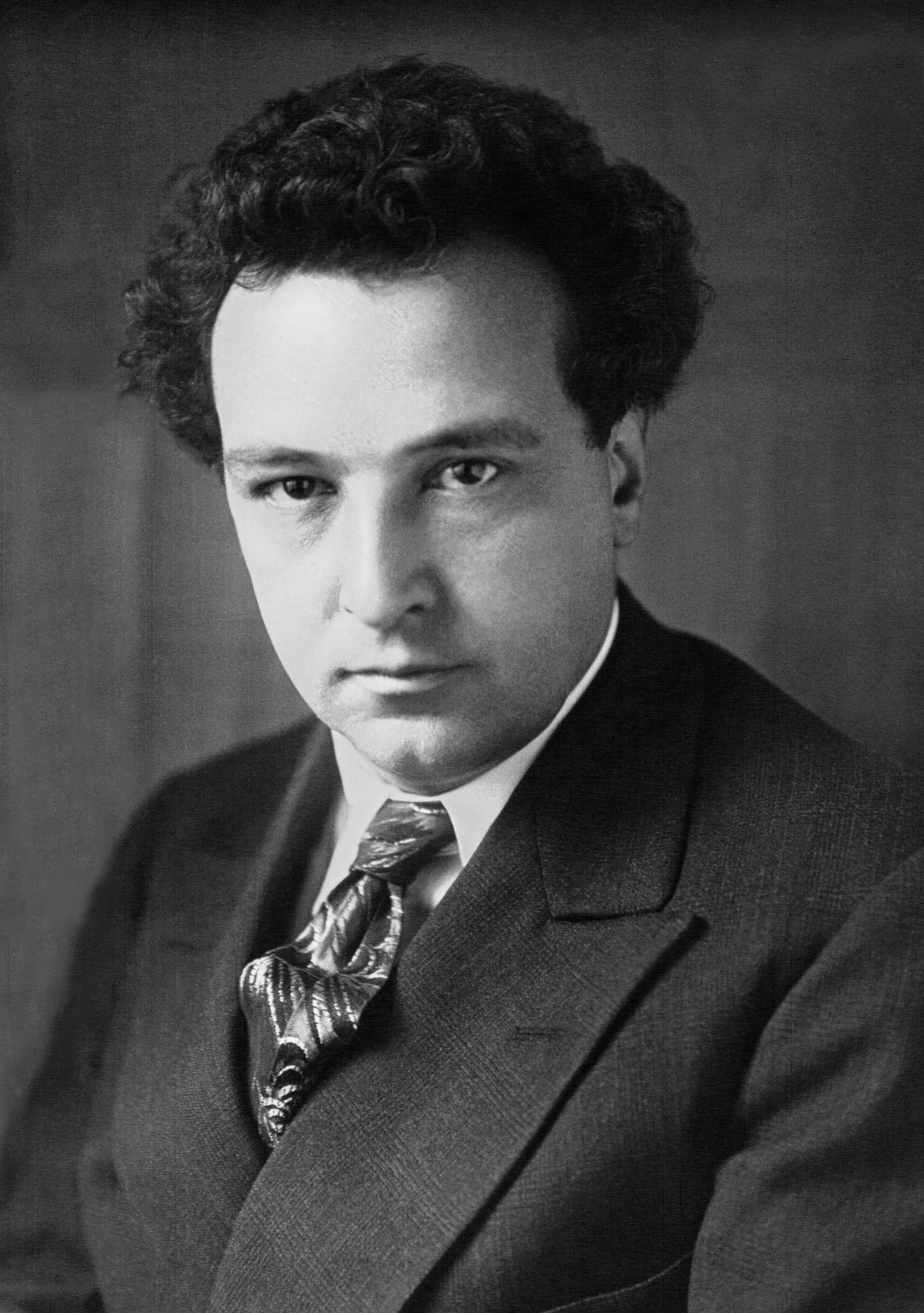
- The composer in 1928
- Catalogue: H 196
- Composed: 1948
- Performed: 6 May 1949: Zurich
- Movements: three
- Scoring: flute; English horn; string orchestra

Concerto da camera (H 196) is a concerto in three movements for the unusual combination of flute, English horn, and string orchestra written by Arthur Honegger late in his career in 1948.

While Honegger was on tour in the United States, the American art patron Elizabeth Sprague Coolidge commissioned him in July 1947 to write a piece, either a sonata or a chamber work, that would treat the English horn as a soloist. As soloist she had in mind Louis Speyer, English horn player of the Boston Symphony Orchestra, to whom the piece is dedicated. Honegger accepted the commission in early August, preferring a concerto form. However, just then he started to suffer for the first time from angina, a condition that would eventually end his career. On August 21 the angina led to coronary thrombosis, and his wife came over to the States to find him incoherent. Honegger did recover, but had to cancel his tour, which also had meant to include Latin America. In November, he returned to France, necessarily by boat. Except for two orchestrations, he would not write music until after a vacation with his and Paul Sacher’s family in Ireland in the summer of 1948, immediately after which he started writing the Concerto da Camera. He finished the bucolic first movement (Allegretto amabile) in August, the second movement (Andante) in September and the finale (Vivace) on October 28.

Honegger described the movements as such: "The first part is based on very simple themes of popular character which stand out against the background of string harmonies from which they arise. The Andante contains a melodic theme, which progresses from solemnity to a sharp brilliance in an atmosphere of somewhat melancholy calm. The finale has the feeling of a scherzo." The soloists perform largely in counterpoint rather than in imitation and dialogue, especially in the second movement where the flute flutters 32nd notes over and around the English horn's warmly expressive lines.

The piece lasts about 17 minutes and has been described to be "breaking the bonds of tonality without even slightly offending the listener's ear" and to be "gracious for the player and delightful to the listener". The second movement has been compared to a prayer of thanksgiving tinged with the quiet gratitude of one who has recently survived an almost fatal illness.

The first performance was on 6 May 1949, in Zürich, with André Jaunet on flute and Marcel Saillet on English horn, accompanied by the Collegium Musicum Zürich conducted by Honegger's friend Paul Sacher. The first American performance was in April 1950 in Minneapolis with Henry Denecke conducting the Northwest Sinfonietta chamber orchestra.

== Sources ==
- Harry Halbreich, Arthur Honegger: Un musicien dans la cité des hommes, translated by Roger Hichols, Amadeus Press, Portland, 1999, ISBN 1574670417
