= Symphony No. 5 (Honegger) =

1950 symphony by Arthur Honegger

- Di tre re
- by Arthur Honegger
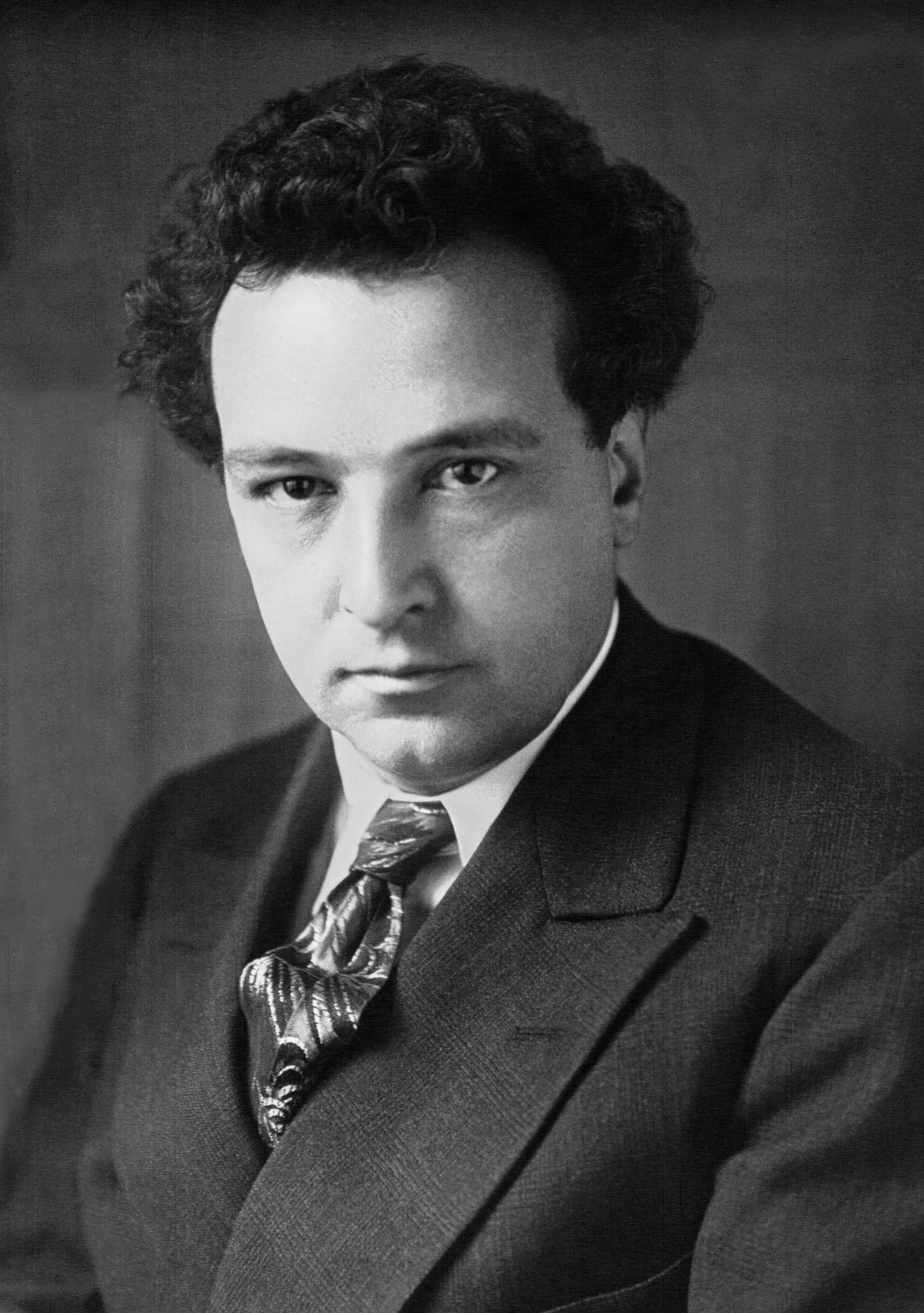
- The composer in 1928
- Composed: 1950
- Dedication: Natalie Koussevitzky Foundation
- Performed: 9 March 1951: Boston
- Movements: three

The Symphony No. 5 by Swiss composer Arthur Honegger is a three-movement work for orchestra written in the autumn of 1950. Its subtitle Di tre re (of the three Ds) is a reference to the D (re) played by the solo timpani and basses at the end of each movement. It was commissioned by the Natalie Koussevitzky Foundation and first performed on 9 March 1951 by the Boston Symphony Orchestra under Charles Munch.

Honegger's Fifth Symphony is a three-movement work with a total running time of about 22 minutes. Its three movements are marked:

1. Grave (approx. 7'20")
2. Allegretto – Adagio – Allegretto – Adagio – Allegretto (approx. 9'00")
3. Allegro marcato (approx. 5'30")

This symphony is published by Éditions Salabert.

== Recordings ==
Recordings of this symphony include full sets of Honegger's five symphonies performed by:

- the Czech Philharmonic Orchestra under Serge Baudo (Supraphon, 1994)
- the Suisse Romande Orchestra under Fabio Luisi (Cascavelle, 2001)
- the Toulouse Capitole Orchestra under Michel Plasson (EMI Classics, 2004)
- the Bavarian Radio Symphony Orchestra under Charles Dutoit (Apex, 2006)

Additional recordings of this symphony include:

- the Boston Symphony Orchestra under Charles Munch (RCA Victor Red Seal and Gold Seal, 1992)
- Orchestre National de France conducted by Charles Munch, recorded June 1964
- the Danish National Symphony Orchestra under Neeme Järvi (Chandos, 1994)
- the Orchestre Lamoureux under Igor Markevitch (recorded 1957, DG Originals, 1997)
- the Vienna Philharmonic Orchestra under Ernest Ansermet (Andante, 2003)
- the RIAS Symphony Orchestra under Igor Markevitch (Audite, 2010)
