= Andrée Vaurabourg =

French pianist (1894–1980)

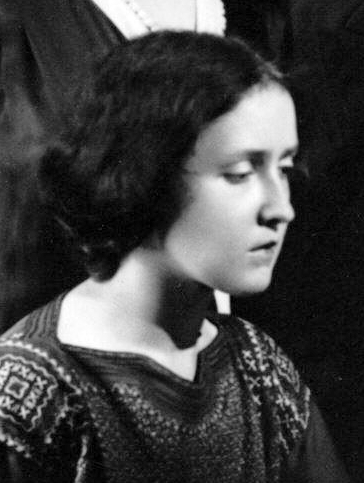
- Born: 8 September 1894; Toulouse, France
- Died: 18 July 1980 (aged 85); Paris, France
- Resting place: Cimetière Saint-Vincent
- Education: Conservatoire de Paris
- Occupations: classical pianist, teacher
- Spouse: Arthur Honegger (m. 1926; died 1955)
- Children: Pascale Honegger

Andrée Louise Vaurabourg-Honegger (8 September 1894 − 18 July 1980) was a French pianist and teacher. She was the wife of Swiss-French composer Arthur Honegger (1892–1955), whom she met at the Paris Conservatoire in 1916. Honegger married her in 1926 on the condition that they live in separate apartments because he required solitude for composing. They lived apart for the duration of their marriage, with two exceptions. In September 1934, while traveling in Spain, Honegger's car ran into a tree after a tire burst. He only broke an ankle, but Vaurabourg, in the front passenger seat, broke both knees and was unable to walk for almost a year. She never fully recovered from the accident. Honegger lived with and cared for her during her recuperation. They also lived together during the last year of Honegger's life, when he could no longer live alone. They had one daughter, Pascale, born in 1932.

She studied piano at the Paris Conservatoire, receiving first prize in counterpoint. She often performed her husband's piano works.

Vaurabourg's students of counterpoint included Pierre Boulez, Serge Garant, and Roger Matton.

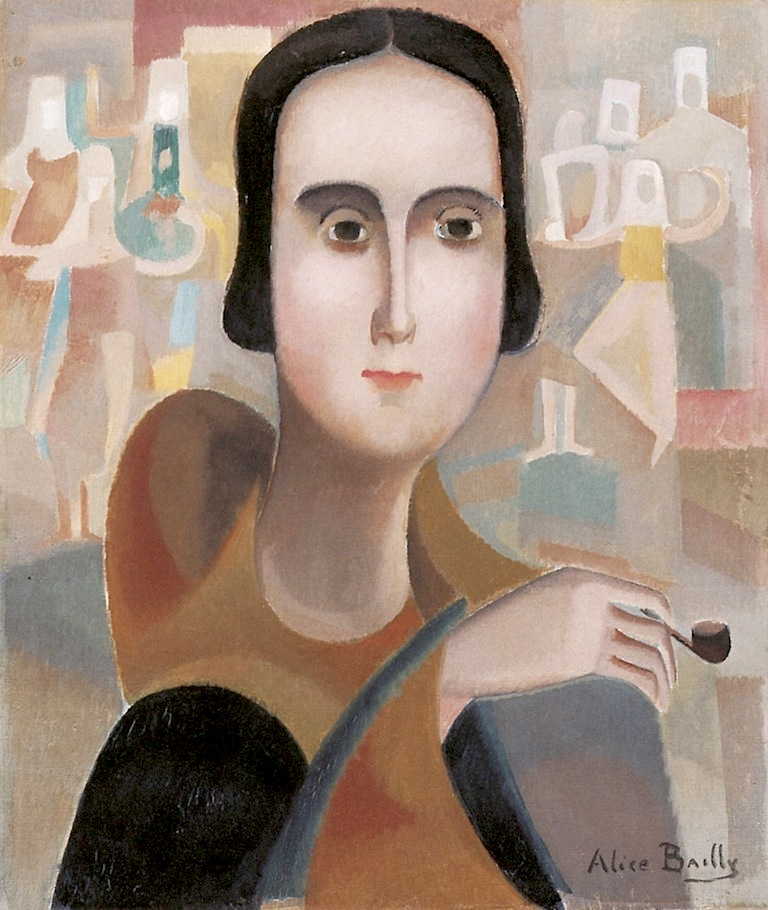
Young Woman with a Pipe (Andrée Vaurabourg), 1920 painting by Alice Bailly

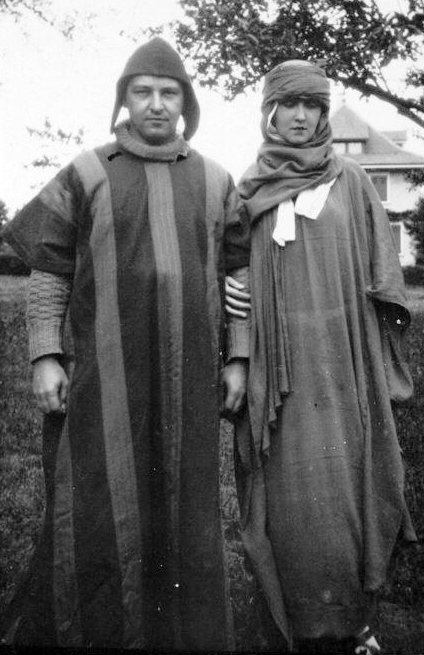
Arthur Honegger and Vaurabourg wearing costumes from Honegger's opera Judith at Mézières, Switzerland, in 1925

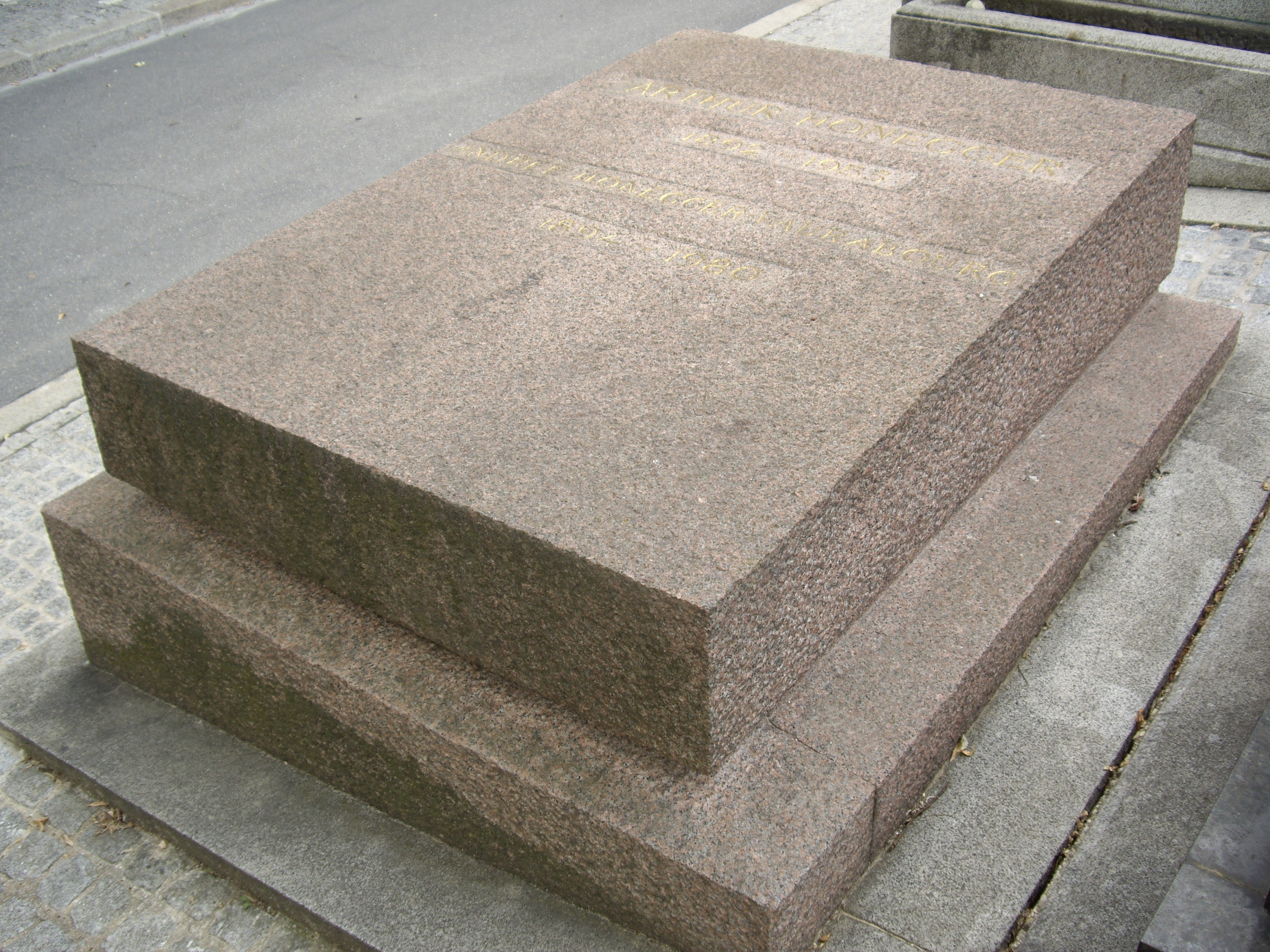
Tomb of Arthur Honegger & Andrée Vaurabourg, Cimetière Saint-Vincent, Paris
