= Danse de la chèvre =

Flute composition by Arthur Honegger

- Composition for flute by Arthur Honegger
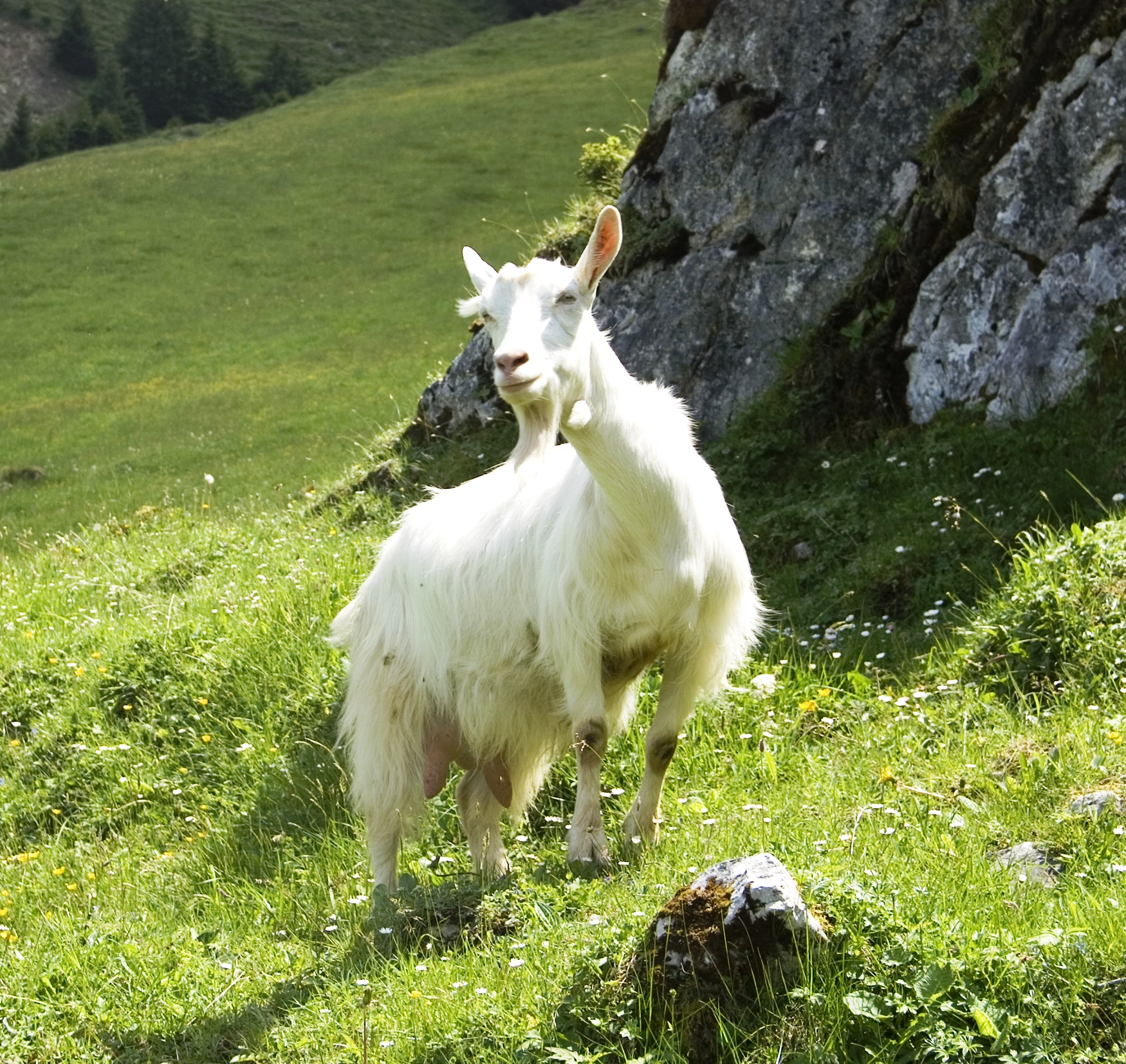
- The topic is the dance of a goat on a grassy hill after the winter snows have melted away
- English: Dance of the Goat
- Composed: 1921
- Scoring: flute

Danse de la chèvre (French for Dance of the Goat) is a piece for solo flute by Arthur Honegger, written in 1921 as incidental music for dancer Lysana of Sacha Derek's play La mauvaise pensée.

At the start of the piece, there is a slow dreamlike introduction consisting of tritone phrases. This soon unwinds into a lively theme that skips along, evoking the dancing goat. The goat theme is a lively 9/8 in an altered F major. After several tempo variations, the music slows and shatters, then finishes in an unearthly harmony. It is approximately four minutes long.

The original manuscript of this piece was lost. Currently published editions are based on a partial transcript by Honegger's transcriptionist.
