= Tibor Harsányi =

Hungarian-French pianist and composer (1898–1954)

Tibor Harsányi (27 June 1898 in Magyarkanizsa, Kingdom of Hungary – 19 September 1954 in Paris) was a Hungarian-born composer and pianist.

He studied at the Budapest Conservatory under Zoltán Kodály. He toured as a pianist around Europe and the Pacific, then settled in the Netherlands in 1920, and worked there as a pianist, conductor and composer before relocating to Paris in 1923. He helped to found the Société Triton, which organised concerts of contemporary music, and established ties with other expatriates, becoming one of the so-called Groupe des Quatre, along with Bohuslav Martinů, Marcel Mihalovici and Conrad Beck. He was also one of a related group of émigré composers known as the École de Paris, which helped bring him together with other colleagues from Central and Eastern Europe, such as Alexander Tansman and Alexander Tcherepnin.

== List of works (chronological) ==
- Four Pieces, for piano (1924)
- Petite Suite for Children, for piano (1924)
- Petite Dance Suite, for piano (1925)
- Rhapsody, for piano (1925)
- Sonatine, for violin and piano (1925)
- Twelve Small Pieces of Average Difficulty, for piano (1926)
- La Semaine, seven short piano pieces for the days of the week (1927)
- Six Short Pieces, for piano (1927)
- Trio, for piano, violin, and cello (1927)
- Duo, for violin and cello (1928)
- Five Brief Preludes, for piano (1928)
- Novelette, for piano (1928)
- Piece, for two pianos (1928)
- Poems (5) of Robert Edward Hart, for voice and piano (1928)
- Sonata, for piano (1928)
- String Quartet (1928)
- Three Dance Pieces, for piano (1928)
- Two Burlesques, for piano (1928)
- Rhythms, five inventions for piano (1929)
- Sonata, for cello and piano (1929)
- Suite, for orchestra (1929)
- Aria-Cadence-Rondo, for cello and orchestra or piano (1930)
- Baby-Dancing, for piano (1930)
- Five Bagatelles, for piano (1930)
- Nonet, for flute, clarinet, oboe, bassoon, horn, and string quartet (1930)
- Sonata, for violin and piano (1930)
- Suite, for piano (1930)
- Three Pieces, for piano and flute (1930)
- Vocalise-Etude, for high voice (1930)
- Blues, for cello and piano (1931)
- Concert Piece, for piano and orchestra (1931)
- Symphonic Overture, for orchestra (1931)
- Concertino, for piano and string quartet (1932)
- La Joie de Vivre, film score for orchestra (1934) on YouTube
- Pastorales, four pieces for piano (1934)
- Les Invités, opera in one act (1937)
- Suite Hongroise, for orchestra (1937)
- Pantins (Puppets), orchestral suite after the ballet (1938)
- Rhapsody, for cello and piano (1939)
- Divertimento no. 1: Concertino, for two violins and chamber orch. (1946)
- Divertimento no. 2: Serenade, for string orchestra and trumpet (1946) on YouTube
- Divertissement Français, for orchestra (1946)
- Concerto, for violin and orchestra (1947)
- Danses variés (1950)
- L'histoire du petit tailleur, for narrator, seven instruments and percussion (1950, based on the folktale "The Brave Little Tailor")
- Cantata de Noel, for SATB, flute and strings (1951-2)
- Five Rhythmic Etudes of Medium Difficulty, for piano (1952)
- Three Impromptus, for piano (1952)
- Three Lyrical Pieces, for piano (1952)
- Sonata, for viola and piano (1953–1954)é
