= Symphony No. 4 (Honegger) =

- Deliciæ Basilienses
- by Arthur Honegger
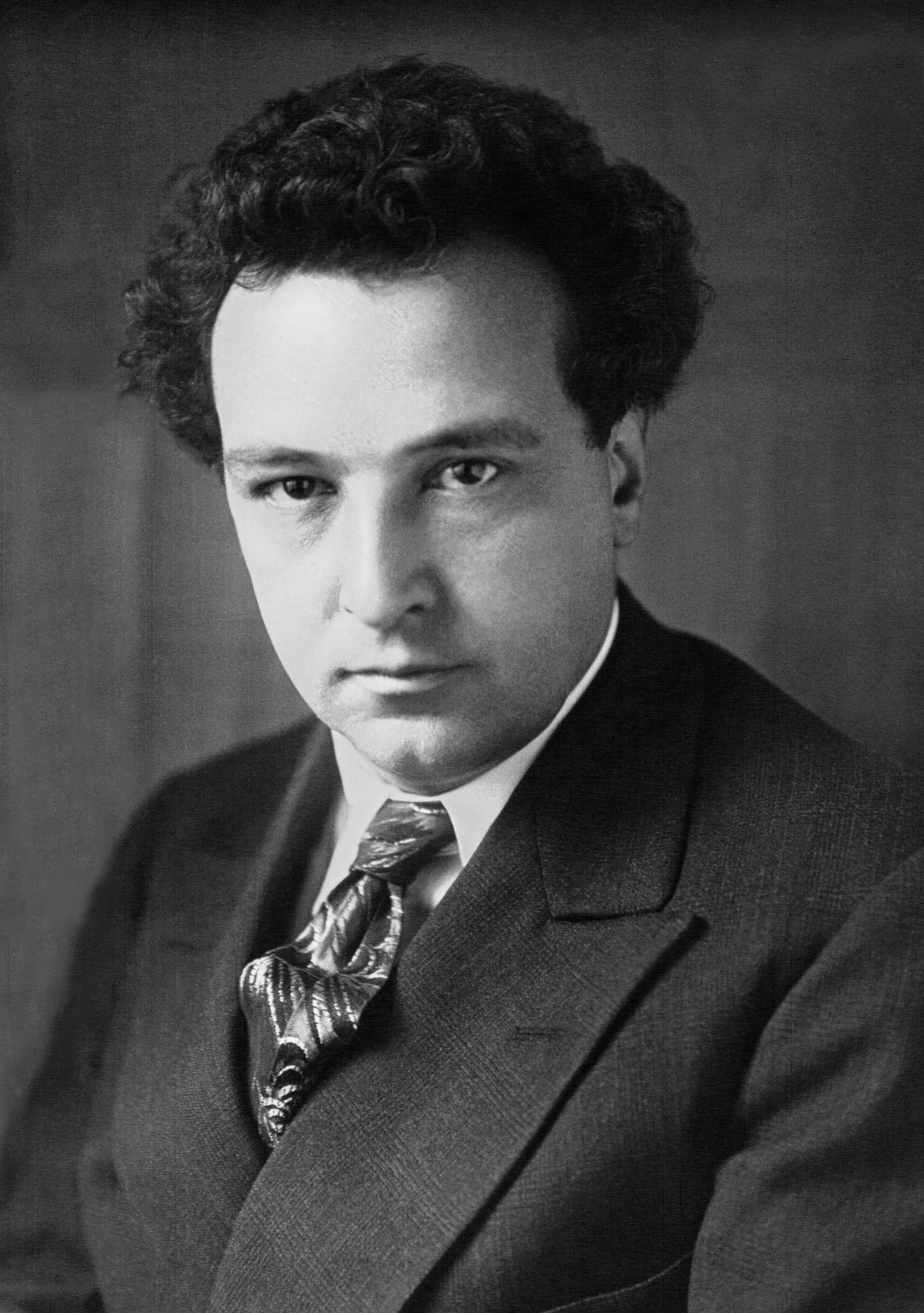
- The composer in 1928
- Composed: 1946
- Dedication: Paul Sacher
- Performed: 21 January 1947: Basel
- Movements: three

The Symphony No. 4 by Swiss composer Arthur Honegger is a work for orchestra, written in 1946 on a commission from Paul Sacher. Subtitled Deliciæ Basilienses, it was first performed on 21 January 1947, by the chamber orchestra Basler Kammerorchester under Sacher. On the same program were the premieres of two other works commissioned by Sacher: Igor Stravinsky's Concerto in D and Bohuslav Martinů's Toccata e due Canzoni.

Honegger's symphony, which contains musical quotations from two Basel folk songs, expresses the composer's happiness during a pleasant stay in the Swiss countryside after the end of World War II. Despite the pastoral and often joyous mood throughout much of the symphony, the closing minutes include some tragic or more serious elements.

Honegger's Fourth Symphony is a three-movement work with a total running time of about 27 minutes. The movements are titled:

1. Lento e misterioso – Allegro (approx. 11'45")
2. Larghetto (approx. 6'15")
3. Allegro (approx. 8'30")

This symphony is published by Éditions Salabert.

== Recordings ==
Recordings of this symphony include full sets of Honegger's symphonies performed by:

- the Czech Philharmonic Orchestra under Sergei Baudo (Supraphon, 1994)
- the Suisse Romande Orchestra under Fabio Luisi (Cascavelle, 2001)
- the Toulouse Capitole Orchestra under Michel Plasson (EMI Classics, 2004)
- the Bavarian Radio Symphony Orchestra under Charles Dutoit (Apex, 2006)

Additional recordings of this symphony include:

- the Suisse Romande Orchestra under Ernest Ansermet (London/Decca Enterprise, 1991)
- the Bournemouth Sinfonietta under Tamás Vásáry (Chandos, 1992)
- the Lausanne Chamber Orchestra under Jesús López-Cobos (Virgin Classics, 1992 and 2001)
- the French National Radio Orchestra under Charles Munch (Apex, 2002)
- the Basel Chamber Orchestra under Christopher Hogwood (Arte Nova, 2005)
- the London Philharmonic Orchestra under Vladimir Jurowski (live recording LPO, 2011)
