= Symphony No. 1 (Honegger) =

Symphony by Arthur Honegger

- by Arthur Honegger
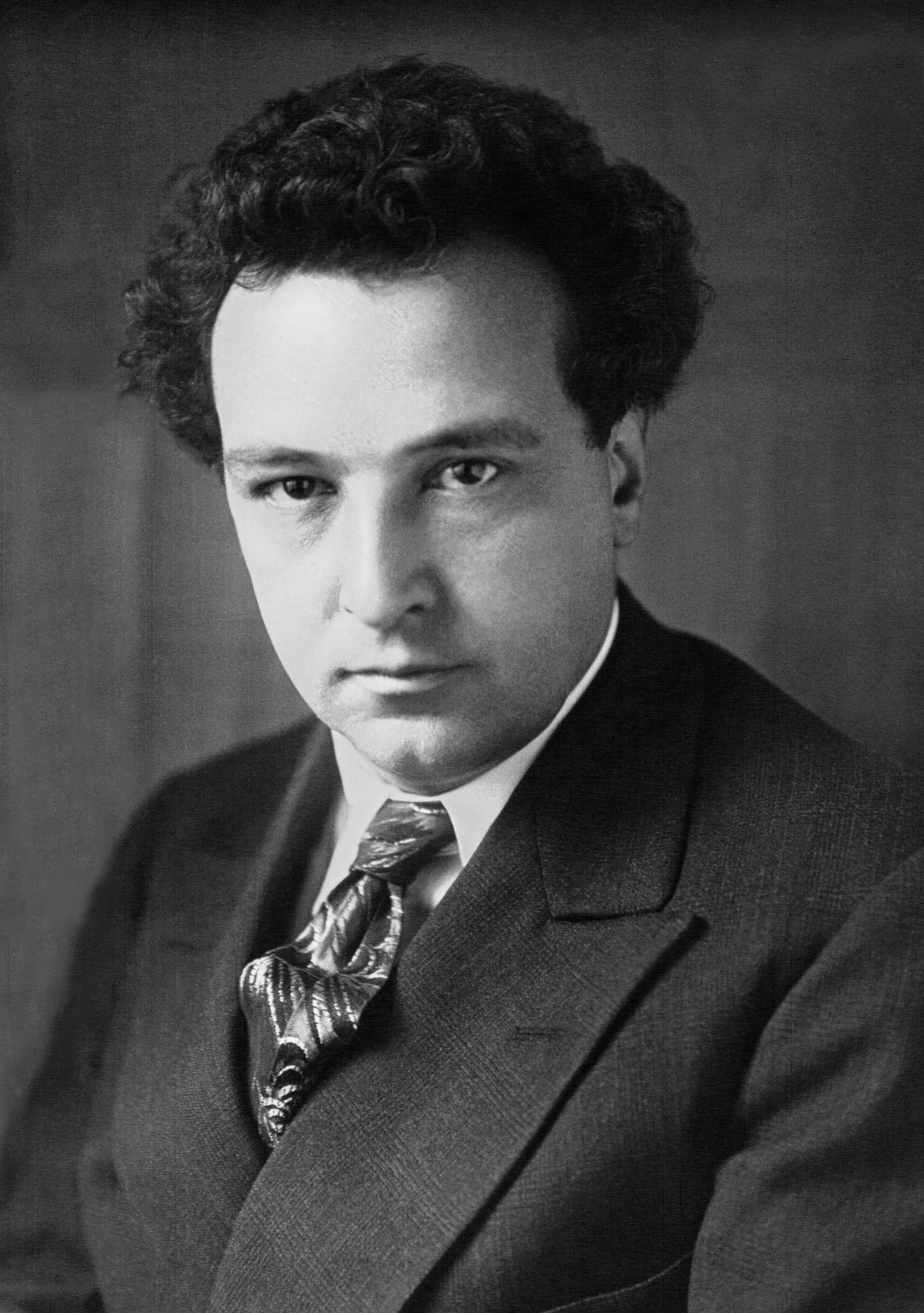
- The composer in 1928
- Occasion: 50th anniversary of the Boston Symphony Orchestra
- Performed: 13 February 1931: Boston
- Movements: three

The Symphony No. 1 by Swiss composer Arthur Honegger is a work for orchestra, written between December 1929 and May 1930 for the fiftieth anniversary of the Boston Symphony Orchestra. Its first performance was given in Boston on February 13, 1931, under Serge Koussevitzky.

Honegger's First Symphony is a three-movement work with a total running time of about 22 minutes. The movements are titled:

1. Allegro marcato (approx. 5'40")
2. Adagio (approx. 9'00")
3. Presto – Andante tranquillo (approx. 7'10")

This symphony is published by Éditions Salabert.

== Recordings ==
Recordings of this symphony include full sets of Honegger's symphonies performed by

- the Czech Philharmonic Orchestra under Sergei Baudo (Supraphon, 1994)
- the Suisse Romande Orchestra under Fabio Luisi (Cascavelle, 2001)
- the Toulouse Capitole Orchestra under Michel Plasson (EMI Classics, 2004)
- the Bavarian Radio Symphony Orchestra under Charles Dutoit (Apex, 2006)
