= A Christmas Cantata (Honegger) =

Cantata and last composition by Arthur Honegger

A Christmas Cantata (French: Une cantate de Noël; German: Eine Weihnachtskantate) is a Christmas cantata composed by Arthur Honegger in 1953; it is reportedly his last composition.

It requires a mixed choir, a baritone soloist, an organ, an orchestra and a children's choir, and it describes the Christmas story. The cantata is divided into three parts.
