= Jeanne d'Arc au bûcher =

1935 oratorio by Arthur Honegger

- Mystère lyrique (a dramatic sort of oratorio) by Arthur Honegger
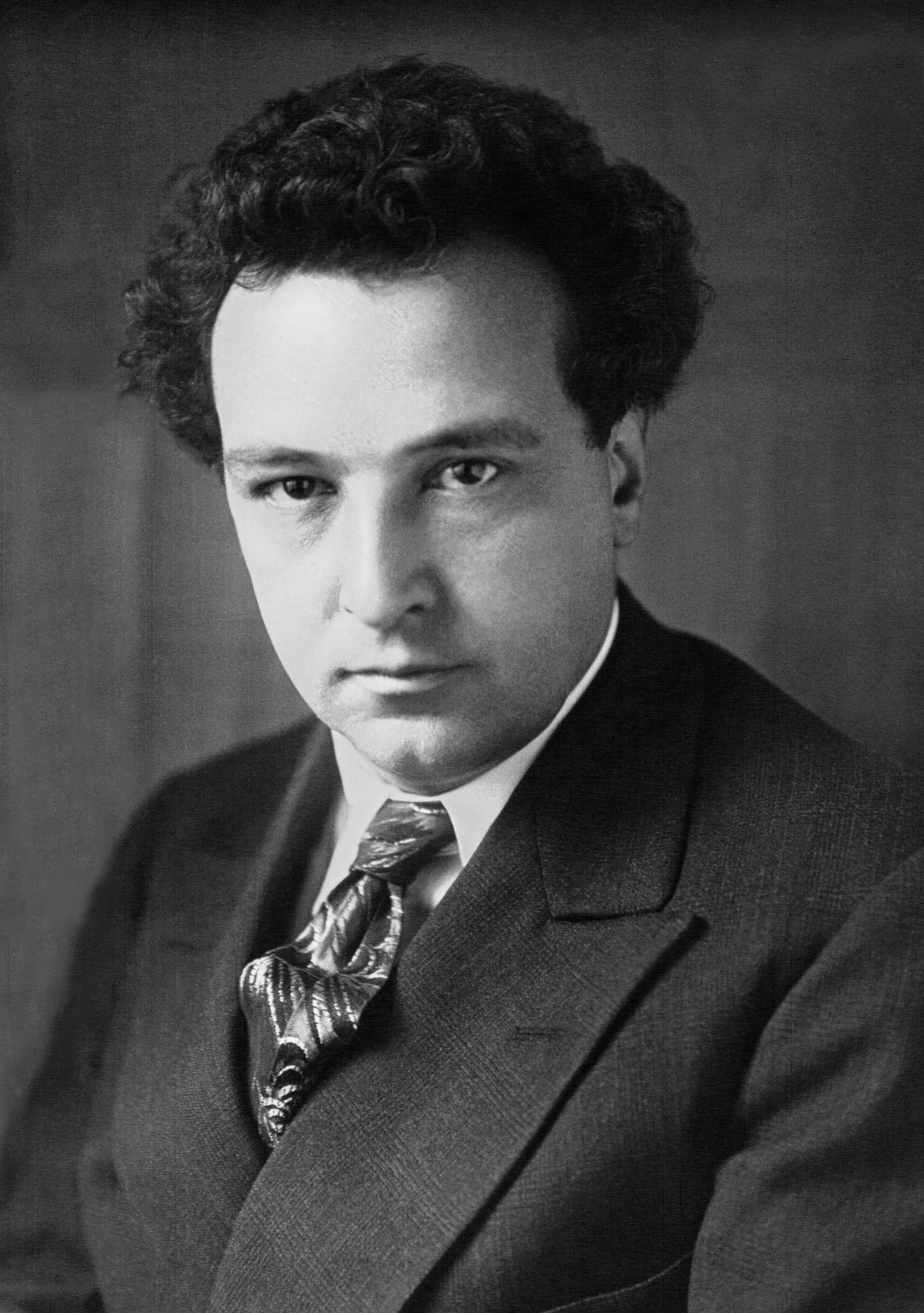
- The composer in 1928
- English: Joan of Arc at the Stake
- Text: by Paul Claudel
- Language: French
- Performed: 12 May 1938: Basel
- Scoring: speakers; soloists; SATB choir; children's choir; orchestra

Jeanne d'Arc au bûcher (Joan of Arc at the Stake) is a mystère lyrique, or sung mystery play (a dramatic sort of oratorio), by Paul Claudel with music by Arthur Honegger. Commissioned by Ida Rubinstein, it was written in 1935, premiered in 1938 and published in 1947 after rounds of minor revisions that extended into 1944. Claudel narrates Joan of Arc's last minutes of life with flashbacks to her trial and younger days. His poème of eleven scenes and a prologue is the work's backbone, with key scenes spoken, but the music, particularly the choral writing, is generally considered its strength, despite Honegger's avowal that he had merely put his services “at the disposal of” the poet. Claudel's frame gave Honegger a space between Heaven and Earth, past and present, for mixing styles and using musical tools — monody, harmony and counterpoint — to build sculpted blocks of sound. One detail of his score is its part for ondes martenot, an early electronic instrument played at the premiere by its inventor Maurice Martenot. The mystère lyrique lasts about 75 minutes.

== Performance history ==
Jeanne d'Arc au bûcher premiered on 12 May 1938 in Basel. Rubinstein acted Jeanne and Jean Périer played Dominique, both spoken roles. Basel Boys Choir, a local adult chorus and a freelance orchestra were conducted by Paul Sacher. It was an immediate success, with critics almost unanimous in praising a perfect cohesion between words and music.

On 6 May 1939, after rehearsals at the Salle Pleyel in Paris, the work was semi-staged with designs by Alexandre Benois at the Théâtre Municipal in Orléans, where Louis Fourestier conducted. The work was heard again in Basel on 12 May 1939 and then in Zürich on 14 May. On 13 June that year at the Palais de Chaillot, it was conducted by Charles Munch (who would go on to lead the United States premiere in New York in 1948). After the outbreak of war the work was performed at the Salle Pleyel and in Brussels (22 and 29 February 1940, respectively). Sacher and Rubinstein made abortive plans for further performances that year, including at the Lucerne Festival.

On 26 February 1947 Rubinstein organised a concert performance at the Palais des Fêtes in Strasbourg, conducted by Fritz Münch, brother of Charles, which was repeated the following year on 13 June in the presence of the composer. Jeanne d'Arc au bûcher was first performed in Canada at the Montreal Festivals in 1953 under conductor Wilfrid Pelletier, and as a staged performance the following year at the Stoll Theatre in London, conducted by Leighton Lucas.

In December 1953 Roberto Rossellini directed a staged version in Italian translation at the Teatro di San Carlo in Naples with Ingrid Bergman in the title role. This was then repeated at La Scala. Both performances received excellent reviews. Rossellini also staged the mystère lyrique at the Paris Opera, now back to the original French, again to critical success. He went on to film the San Carlo production in French and Italian versions. The film was released in Italy in 1954 under the Italian title Giovanna d'Arco al rogo, but it was a box-office failure and so the French version was never released.

=== First radio broadcast ===
Jeanne d'Arc au bûcher was part of the 1957–58 New York Philharmonic season at Carnegie Hall with Felicia Montealegre as Jeanne d'Arc, Adele Addison as the Virgin Mary, Leontyne Price as St Marguerite, Martial Singher as Brother Dominique, Frances Bible as St Catherine and Leonard Bernstein conducting. The three performances took place in April (1958) and there was a broadcast.

=== More recent performances ===
Seiji Ozawa conducted a performance at the Basilique de Saint-Denis in Paris in 1989 starring Marthe Keller, and a recording ensued. Hiroshi Wakasugi led performances in Tokyo in 1994, though these did not constitute the work's Japanese premiere.

Marion Cotillard has portrayed Joan of Arc in several live performances. First in 2005, in Orléans, with the Orléans Symphony Orchestra directed by Jean-Pierre Loisil; again in 2012 in Barcelona with the Barcelona Symphony Orchestra and National Orchestra of Catalonia, directed by Marc Soustrot; in 2015 with the New York Philharmonic at Avery Fisher Hall, in Monaco with the Monte-Carlo Philharmonic Orchestra at the Rainier III Auditorium, and also in Paris with the Paris Philharmonic Orchestra, and in Toulouse with the Orchestre National du Capitole, directed by Kazuki Yamada; in 2018 at the Spoleto Festival dei Due Mondi in Piazza del Duomo in Spoleto, Italy directed by Benoît Jacquot; in 2019 at the Romanian Athenaeum in Bucharest, Romania directed by Alexandre Bloch; in 2022 at the Teatro Real in Madrid, Spain directed by Juanjo Mena; and in 2024 at the Berliner Philharmonie with the Berlin Philharmonic conducted by Alan Gilbert.

== Recordings ==
The first recording was made in wartime Brussels in January 1943 by La Voix de Son Maître (French EMI), with Marthe Dugard as Jeanne and the Belgian National Orchestra conducted by Lodewijk de Vocht. This omits the brief Prologue, which Honegger wrote only the following year. In 1952 the Philadelphia Orchestra under Eugene Ormandy made the first complete recording, for Columbia Masterworks, with Vera Zorina as Jeanne. RAI, Italian radio, taped a 1953 performance in Naples capturing Ingrid Bergman in the title role and opera singers Marcella Pobbe, Giacinto Prandelli and Alfredo Colella in the main soprano, tenor and bass sung parts; this is conducted by Gianandrea Gavazzeni. Before the decade was out, in 1958, Leonard Bernstein conducted performances with the New York Philharmonic, his wife Felicia Montealegre as Jeanne and Martial Singher as Dominique; one of these was broadcast, resulting in a pirate recording.

Seiji Ozawa made a studio recording for CBS in 1965 and Serge Baudo made one for Supraphon in 1974. The latter, using the Czech Philharmonic, features Nelly Borgeaud as Jeanne and is often cited for her contribution. Jeanne d'Arc au bûcher remained in Ozawa's repertory: a 1989 live performance of his at the Basilica of Saint-Denis with the French National Orchestra and Marthe Keller was released by Deutsche Grammophon and another from 1993 in Matsumoto was issued as a DVD. More recent recordings include one of a 2012 Soustrot Barcelona concert with Marion Cotillard (on the Alpha label) and another compiled from two 2018 live concerts in Amsterdam conducted by Stéphane Denève, with the Royal Concertgebouw Orchestra and Judith Chemla acting Jeanne (on RCO Live).

== Roles ==
- Jeanne d'Arc, spoken (dancer) – Ida Rubinstein
- Virgin Mary, soprano – Berthe de Vigier
- St Marguerite/First voice, soprano – Rosa van Herck
- St Catherine, contralto – Ginevra Vivante
- Brother Dominique, spoken – Jean Périer
- Porcus, tenor – Ernst Bauer
- Heurtebise/Clerk, tenor – Charles Vaucher
- Second voice/First herald – Serge Chandoz
- Second herald/Third voice, bass
- Narrator, spoken
- Master of ceremonies, spoken
- Third herald, spoken
- Duke of Bedford, spoken
- Jean de Luxembourg, spoken
- Regnault de Chartres, spoken
- Guillaume de Flavy, spoken
- Perrot
