= Symphony No. 2 (Honegger) =

- by Arthur Honegger
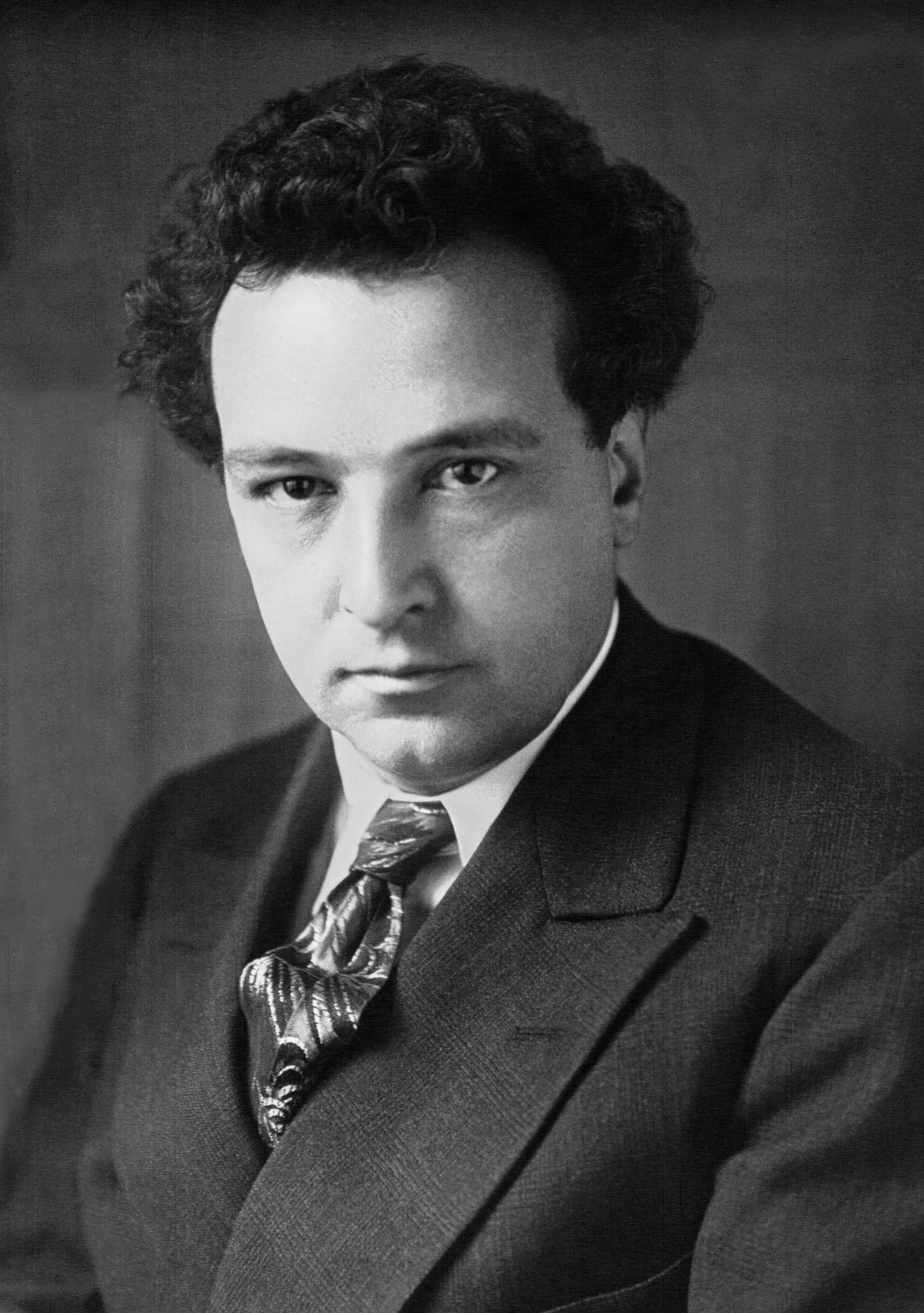
- The composer in 1928
- Dedication: Paul Sacher
- Performed: 18 May 1942: Zurich
- Movements: three
- Scoring: string orchestra; trumpet

The Symphony No. 2 for strings and trumpet by Arthur Honegger was commissioned in 1937 by Paul Sacher to mark the tenth anniversary of the chamber orchestra Basler Kammerorchester. Progress was slow, however, in part due to the interruption of the Second World War. The music is primarily for strings alone and is very turbulent and troubled until the trumpet soloist enters near the end of the music, giving this mostly tragic work a hopeful ending.

The first performance was given by the Collegium Musicum of Zurich under Sacher on 18 May 1942.

The work is in three movements:

1. Molto moderato – Allegro
2. Adagio mesto
3. Vivace non troppo

The work is for string orchestra, except for the addition of a trumpet in the concluding chorale: "like pulling out an organ stop", according to the composer. The trumpet part is marked ad libitum, and although occasionally performed by strings alone, most performances include the trumpet.

Numerous recordings have been made of the work, including performances conducted by Charles Munch, Serge Baudo, Ernest Ansermet, Herbert von Karajan, Mariss Jansons and Charles Dutoit.
