= List of operas by Ernst Krenek =

This is a list of operas by the Austrian-born (later American) composer Ernst Krenek (1900–1991).

Opus	Title	Genre	Subdivisions	Libretto	Composition	Première date	Place, theatre
14	Die Zwingburg	szenische Kantate	1 act	Fritz Demuth and Franz Werfel	1922	20 October 1924	Berlin, Staatsoper
17	Der Sprung über den Schatten	komische Oper	3 acts	composer	1923	9 June 1924	Oper Frankfurt
21	Orpheus und Eurydike	Schauspiel	3 acts	Oskar Kokoschka	1923	27 November 1926	Kassel, Staatstheater
36	Bluff	musikalische Komödie	3 acts	Carl von Levetzow, after George Gribble	1924-25		
45	Jonny spielt auf		2 acts	composer	1925	10 February 1927	Leipzig Opera
49	Der Diktator	tragische Oper	1 act	composer	1926	6 May 1928	Wiesbaden, Staatstheater
50	Das geheime Königreich	Märchenoper	1 act	composer	1926-27	6 May 1928	Wiesbaden, Staatstheater
55	Schwergewicht, oder Die Ehre der Nation	burleske Operette	1 act	composer		5 November 1927	Cologne, Opera
60	Leben des Orest	grosse Oper	5 acts	composer	1928-29	19 January 1930	Leipzig, Neues Theater
66	Kehraus um St Stephan	Satire mit musik	2 acts	composer	1930	6 December 1990	Vienna, Ronacher
73	Karl V	Bühnenwerk mit Musik	2 parts	composer	1931-33	first version: 22 June 1938; second version: 11 May 1958	Prague, Neues Deutsches Theater; Düsseldorf, Deutsche Oper am Rhein
77	Cefalo e Procri	fable	prologue and 3 scenes	Rinaldo Küfferle		15 September 1934	Venice, Teatro Goldoni
90	Tarquin	drama with music	2 parts	Emmet Lavery	1940-41	16 July 1950	Cologne Opera
111	What Price Confidence?	komische Kammeroper	9 scenes	composer	1945-46	22 May 1962	Saarbrücken, Stadttheater
125	Dark Waters		1 act	composer	1950	2 May 1951	Los Angeles, Bovard Auditorium
144	Pallas Athene weint		prologue and 3 acts	composer	1952-55	17 October 1955	Hamburg, Staatsoper
153	The Bell Tower		1 act	composer, after Herman Melville	1955-56	17 March 1957	Urbana, Illinois, Lincoln Hall Theatre
179	Ausgerechnet und verspielt	Spieloper	1 act	composer		25 July 1962	Vienna, ORF
186	Der goldene Bock (Chrysomallos)		4 acts	composer	1962-63	16 June 1964	Hamburg, Staatsoper
192	Der Zauberspiegel	television opera	14 scenes	composer	1963-66	6 September 1967	Munich, Bayerischer Rundfunk
206	Sardakai, oder Das kommt davon		11 scenes	composer	1967-69	27 June 1970	Hamburg, Staatsoper
217	Flaschenpost vom Paradies oder Der englische Ausflug	television opera		composer	1973	8 March 1974	Vienna, ORF
