= Otto Klemperer =

Conductor and composer (1885–1973)

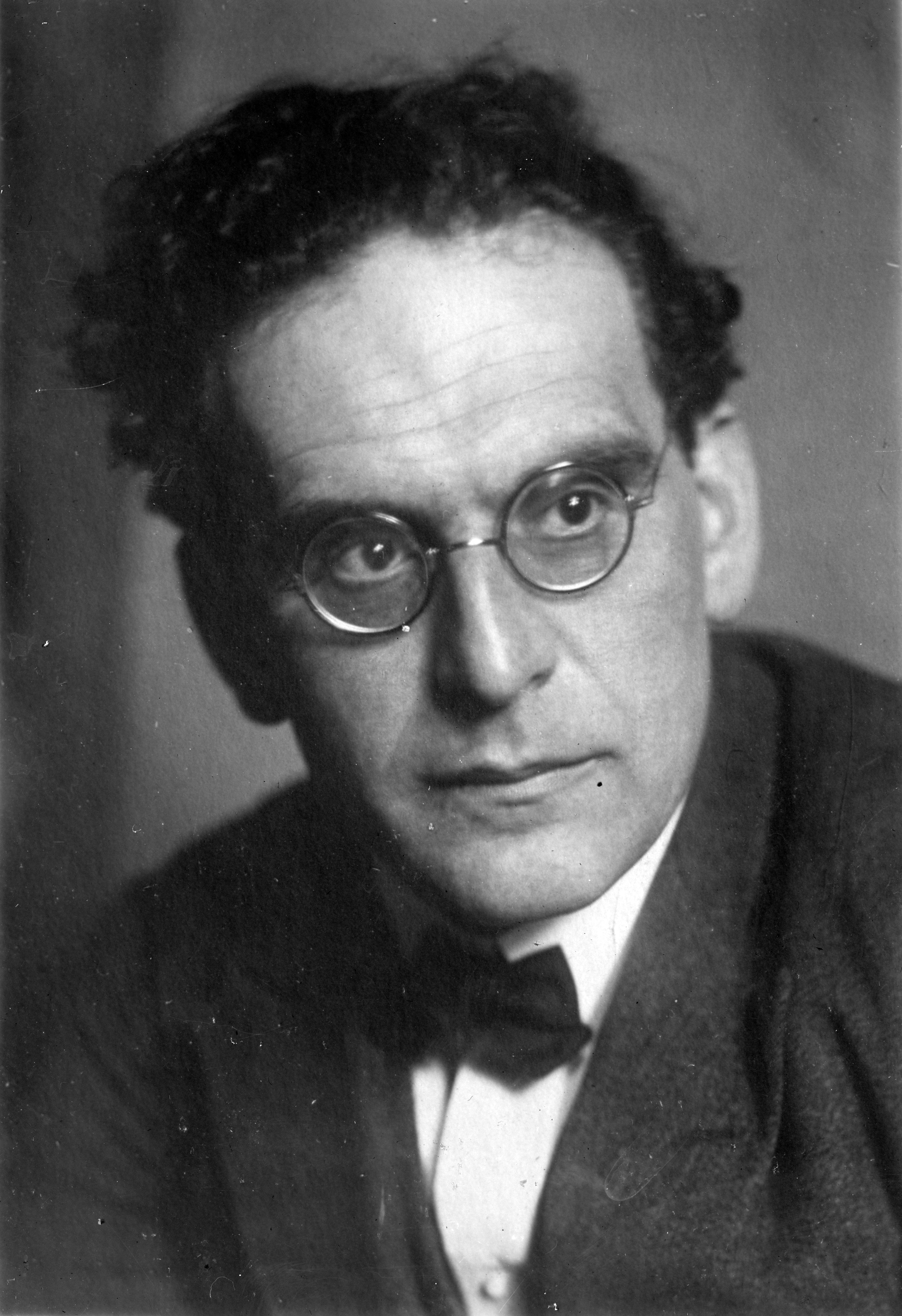
- Klemperer c. 1920
- Born: Otto Nossan Klemperer; 14 May 1885; Breslau, German Empire
- Died: 6 July 1973 (aged 88); Zürich, Switzerland
- Citizenship: German (1885–1935; 1954–1973); American (1940–1954); Israeli (joint nationality, 1970–1973)
- Occupations: Conductor, composer
- Spouse: Johanna Geisler (m. 1919, died 1956)
- Children: Werner and Lotte

Otto Nossan Klemperer (German: [ˌɔto ˈklɛmpəʁɐ]; 14 May 1885 – 6 July 1973) was a German composer and conductor, originally based in Germany, and then the United States, Hungary and finally, Great Britain. He began his career as an opera conductor, but he was later better known as a conductor of symphonic music.

A protégé of the composer and conductor Gustav Mahler, from 1907 Klemperer was appointed to a succession of increasingly senior conductorships in opera houses in and around Germany. Between 1927 and 1931 he was director of the Kroll Opera in Berlin, where he presented new works and avant-garde productions of classics. He was from a Jewish family, and the rise of the Nazis caused him to leave Germany in 1933. Shortly afterwards he was appointed chief conductor of the Los Angeles Philharmonic, and guest-conducted other American orchestras, including the San Francisco Symphony, the New York Philharmonic and later the Pittsburgh Symphony, which he reorganised as a permanent ensemble.

In 1939 Klemperer was diagnosed with a brain tumour. An operation to remove it was successful, but left him lame and partly paralysed on his right side. Throughout his life he had bipolar disorder, and after the operation he went through an intense manic phase of the illness and then a long spell of severe depression. His career was seriously disrupted and did not fully recover until the mid-1940s. He served as the musical director of the Hungarian State Opera in Budapest from 1947 to 1950.

Klemperer's later career centred on London. In 1951 he began an association with the Philharmonia Orchestra. By that time better known for his readings of the core German symphonic repertoire than for experimental modern music, he gave concerts and made almost 200 recordings with the Philharmonia and its successor, the New Philharmonia, until his retirement in 1972. His approach to Mozart was not universally liked, being thought of by some as heavy, but he became widely considered the most authoritative interpreter of the symphonies of Beethoven, Brahms, Bruckner and Mahler.

== Life and career ==
=== Early years ===
Otto Nossan (Note: Nossan is the Ashkenazic rendering of the Sephardic "Nathan".) Klemperer was born on 14 May 1885 in Breslau, Province of Silesia, in what was then the Imperial German state of Prussia (now Wrocław, Poland). He was the second child and only son of Nathan Klemperer and his wife Ida, née Nathan. (Note: The Klemperers' other children were Regina (1883–1965) and Marianne (1889–1967).) The family name had originally been Klopper, but was changed to Klemperer in 1787 in response to a decree by the Austrian emperor Joseph II aimed at assimilating Jews into Christian society. Nathan Klemperer was originally from Josefov, the ghetto in the Bohemian city of Prague; Ida was from a more prosperous Sephardic Jewish family in Hamburg. Both parents were musical: Nathan sang and Ida played the piano.

When Klemperer was four the family moved from Breslau to Hamburg, where Nathan earned a modest living in commercial posts and his wife gave piano lessons. It was decided quite early in Klemperer's life that he would become a professional musician, and when he was about five he started piano lessons with his mother. At the Hoch Conservatory in Frankfurt he studied the piano with James Kwast and theory with Ivan Knorr. Kwast moved to Berlin, first to the Klindworth-Scharwenka Conservatory in 1902 and then to the Stern Conservatory in 1905. Klemperer followed him at each move, and later credited him with the whole basis of his musical development. Among Klemperer's other teachers was Hans Pfitzner, with whom he studied composition and conducting.

Gustav Mahler recommends Herr Klemperer as an outstanding musician, who despite his youth is already very experienced and is predestined for a conductor's career. He vouches for the successful outcome of any probationary appointment and will gladly provide further information personally.

— Testimonial given to Klemperer by Mahler in 1907

In 1905, Klemperer met Gustav Mahler at a rehearsal of the latter's Second Symphony in Berlin. Oskar Fried conducted, and Klemperer was given charge of the off-stage orchestra. He later made a piano arrangement (now lost) of the symphony, which he played to the composer in 1907 when visiting Vienna. In the interim he made his public debut as a conductor in May 1906, taking over from Fried after the first night of the fifty-performance run of Max Reinhardt's production of Orpheus in the Underworld at the New Theatre, Berlin.

Mahler wrote a short testimonial, recommending Klemperer, on a small card which Klemperer kept for the rest of his life. On the strength of Mahler's endorsement, Klemperer was appointed chorus master and assistant conductor at the New German Theatre in Prague in 1907.

=== German opera houses ===
From Prague, Klemperer moved to be assistant conductor at the Hamburg State Opera (1910–1912), where the sopranos Lotte Lehmann and Elisabeth Schumann made their joint débuts under his direction. (Note: At the Hamburg Opera Klemperer came to international attention for the first time, but not for musical reasons: the husband of one the singers of the company attempted to horsewhip him during a performance. Klemperer jumped off the podium and came at his assailant with bare fists. The incident was much reported in foreign newspapers. The attacker's motives were not recorded at the time, but according to Walter Legge's memoirs, the assailant's wife was Elisabeth Schumann and Klemperer was having an affair with her.) His first chief conductorship was at Barmen (1912–1913), after which he moved to the much larger Strasbourg Opera (1914–1917) as deputy to Pfitzner. From 1917 to 1924 he was chief conductor of the Cologne Opera. During his Cologne years he married Johanna Geisler, a singer in the opera company, in 1919. She was a Christian, and he had converted from Judaism. He remained a practising Roman Catholic until 1967, when he left the faith and returned to Judaism. The couple had two children: Werner, who became an actor, and Lotte, who became her father's assistant and eventually, his caregiver. Johanna continued her operatic career, sometimes in performances conducted by her husband. She retired from singing by the mid-1930s. The couple remained close and mutually supportive until her death in 1956.

In 1923, Klemperer turned down an invitation from the Berlin State Opera to succeed Leo Blech as musical director; he declined the post, because he did not believe he would be given enough artistic authority over productions. The following year, he became conductor at the Prussian State Theatre in Wiesbaden (1924–1927), a smaller theatre than others in which he had worked, but one where he had the control he sought over stagings. There he conducted new, and often modernistic, productions of a range of operas from The Marriage of Figaro, Don Giovanni, Fidelio and Lohengrin to Elektra and The Soldier's Tale. He found his tenure there rewarding and fulfilling, later describing it as the happiest of his career.

Klemperer visited Russia in 1924, conducting there during a six-week stay; he returned each year until 1936. In 1926 he made his American début, succeeding Eugene Goossens as guest conductor of the New York Symphony Orchestra. In his eight-week engagement with the orchestra he gave Mahler's Ninth Symphony and Janáček's Sinfonietta, in their first performances in the US.

=== Berlin ===
In 1927, a new opera company was established in Berlin to complement the State Opera, highlighting new works and innovative productions. The company, officially Staatsoper am Platz der Republik, was better known as the Kroll Opera. Leo Kestenberg, the influential head of the Prussian Ministry of Culture, proposed Klemperer as its first director. Klemperer was offered a ten-year contract and accepted it on condition that he would be allowed to conduct orchestral concerts in the theatre, and that he could employ his chosen design and stage experts.

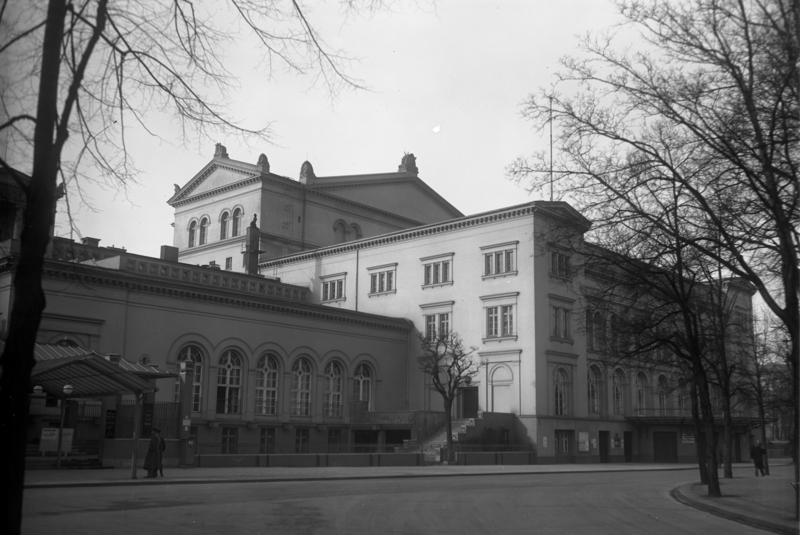
Kroll Opera House, 1930

Klemperer's biographer Peter Heyworth describes the conductor's tenure at the Kroll as "of crucial significance in his career and the development of opera in the first half of the 20th century". In both concert and operatic performances, Klemperer introduced much new music. Asked later which were the most important of the operas he introduced there, he listed:

The Stravinsky works − Oedipus rex, Mavra, L'Histoire du soldat; Krenek's three one-act operas, Der Diktator, Das geheime Königreich and Schwergewicht, as well as Das Leben des Orest; Hindemith's Cardillac, Neues vom Tage, and Hin und zurück; Janáček's Aus einem Totenhaus, with its libretto from Dostoevsky; and Schoenberg's Erwartung and Die glückliche Hand.

In Heyworth's view, the modern approach to production at the Kroll − contrasting with conventional representational settings and costumes − exemplified in "a drastically stylised production" of Der fliegende Holländer in 1929 was "a decisive forerunner of Wieland Wagner's innovations at Bayreuth". The production divided critical opinion, which ranged from "A new outrage to a German masterpiece ... grotesque" to "an unusual and magnificent performance ... a fresh wind has blown tinsel and cobwebs away". (Note: Klemperer was noted for his laconic wit; a much retold story is of his backstage encounter with the composer's son, Siegfried, after the dress rehearsal of the controversial production of Der fliegende Holländer. Punning on setzen (be seated) and entsetzen (be appalled), Klemperer offered his visitor a chair: "Grüss Gott, Herr Wagner, bitte entsetzen sie sich" – Greetings, Herr Wagner, please be appalled.)

In 1929, Klemperer made his British début, conducting the London Symphony Orchestra in the first London performance of Bruckner's Eighth Symphony. The British music critics gave the symphony a lukewarm reception, but Klemperer was widely praised for "the power of a dominating personality", "masterful control" and as "a great orchestral commander". A leading critic called for the BBC to give Klemperer a long-term appointment in London.

The Kroll Opera closed in 1931, ostensibly because of a financial crisis, although in Klemperer's view the motives were political. He said that Heinz Tietjen, director of the State Opera, told him that it was not, as Klemperer supposed, anti-Semitism that had worked against him: "No, that is not so important. It's your whole political and artistic direction they don't like." Klemperer's contract obliged him to transfer to the main State Opera, where, with such conductors as Bruno Walter, Wilhelm Furtwängler and Leo Blech already established, there was little important work for him. He remained there until 1933, when the rise of the Nazis caused him to leave for safety in Switzerland, joined by his wife and children.

=== Los Angeles ===
In exile from Germany, Klemperer found that conducting work was far from plentiful, although he secured some prestigious engagements in Vienna and at the Salzburg Festival. He was sounded out by William Andrews Clark, founder and sponsor of the Los Angeles Philharmonic, about becoming the orchestra's chief conductor in succession to Artur Rodziński, who was leaving to take over the Cleveland Orchestra. The Los Angeles orchestra was not then regarded as among the finest American ensembles, and the salary was less than Klemperer would have liked, but he accepted and sailed to the US in 1933.

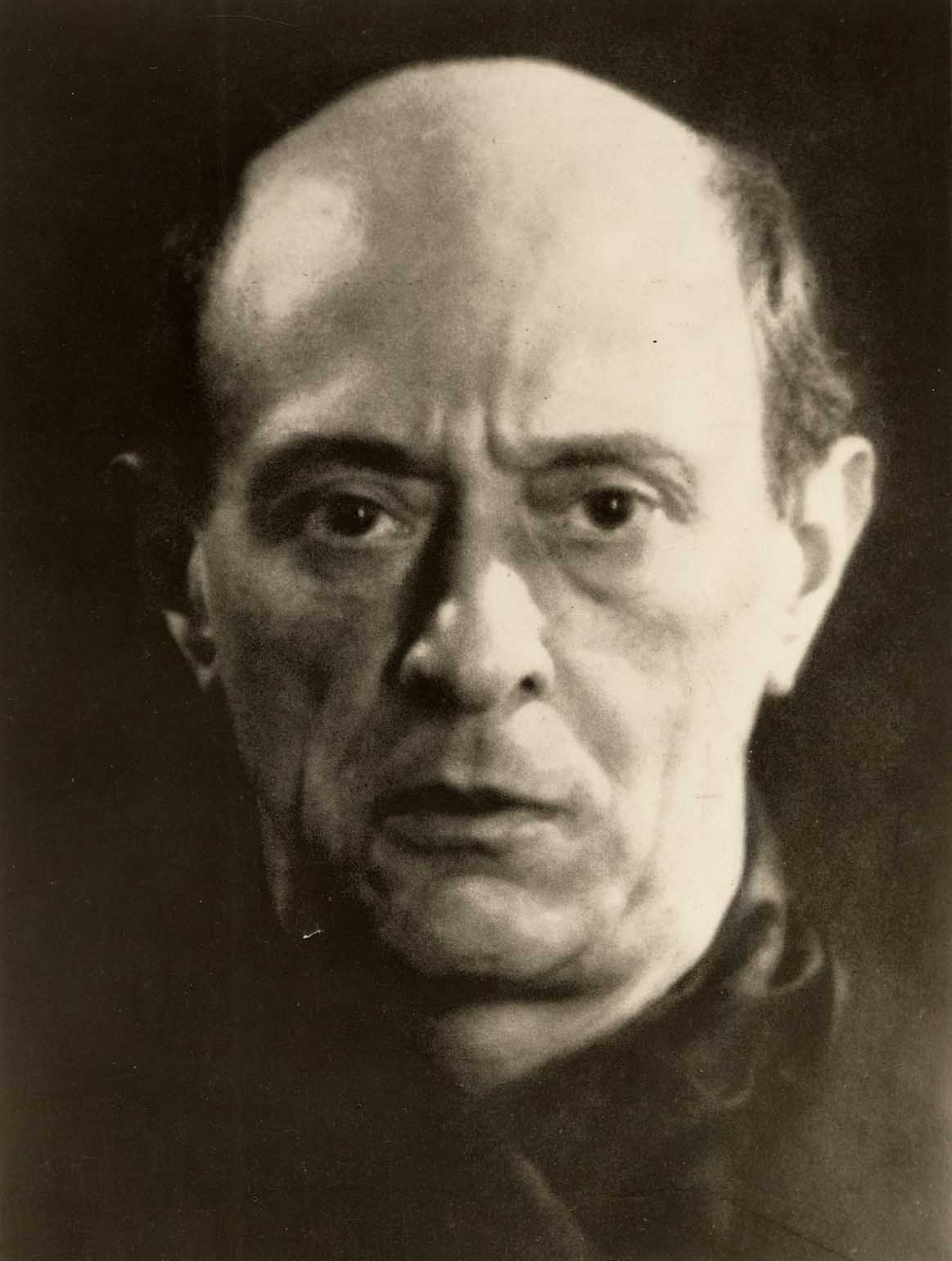
Arnold Schoenberg gave Klemperer composition lessons.

The orchestra's finances were perilous; Clark had lost a substantial portion of his fortune in the Great Depression and could no longer afford subventions on the scale of earlier years. Despite box-office constraints, Klemperer successfully introduced unfamiliar works including Mahler's Das Lied von der Erde and Second Symphony, Bruckner's Fourth and Seventh Symphonies, and works by Stravinsky. He programmed music from Gurrelieder by his fellow exile and Los Angeles neighbour Arnold Schoenberg, although the composer complained that Klemperer did not perform his works more often. Klemperer insisted that the local public was not ready for such demanding music; Schoenberg did not bear a grudge and, as Klemperer always aspired to compose as well as to conduct, Schoenberg gave him composition lessons. Klemperer considered him "the greatest living teacher of composition, although ... he never mentioned the twelve-tone system". The musicologist Hans Keller nevertheless found "tonal varieties of the Schoenbergian method" used "penetratingly" in Klemperer's compositions.

In 1935, at Arthur Judson's invitation, Klemperer conducted the New York Philharmonic for four weeks. The orchestra's chief conductor, Arturo Toscanini, was in Europe and Klemperer took charge of the opening concerts of the season. The New York concert-going public was deeply conservative but despite Judson's warning that programming Mahler would be highly damaging at the box-office, Klemperer insisted on giving the Second Symphony. The notices praised the conducting – Oscar Thompson wrote in Musical America that the performance was the best he had heard since Mahler conducted the work in New York in 1906 – but the ticket sales were as poor as Judson had predicted, and the orchestra had a deficit of $5,000 from the concert. When Toscanini resigned from the philharmonic the following year, he recommended Klemperer as his successor, but Klemperer recognised that after "this affair of the Mahler symphony" he would not be re-engaged. Nonetheless, when the then little-known John Barbirolli was announced as Toscanini's successor, Klemperer wrote a vehement letter to Judson protesting at being passed over. (Note: Klemperer later conceded that Barbirolli "wasn't so bad" and was badly underrated by the New York critics.)

Having returned to Los Angeles, Klemperer conducted the orchestra's concerts there and in out-of-town venues such as San Diego, Santa Barbara, Fresno and Claremont. He and the orchestra worked with leading soloists, including Artur Schnabel, Emanuel Feuermann, Joseph Szigeti, Bronisław Huberman and Lotte Lehmann. Pierre Monteux was conductor of the San Francisco Symphony and he and Klemperer guest-conducted each other's orchestras. After a concert under Klemperer in 1936, the San Francisco Chronicle's music critic hailed him as one of the world's greatest conductors, along with Furtwängler, Walter and Toscanini.

=== 1938 to 1945 ===
The governing board of the Pittsburgh Symphony approached Klemperer in early 1938, seeking his help in reconstituting the orchestra – an ad hoc group since 1927 – as a permanent ensemble. He held auditions in Pittsburgh and, more fruitfully, in New York, and after three weeks of intensive rehearsal the orchestra was ready for the opening concerts of the season, which he conducted. The results were highly successful, and he was offered a large salary to remain as the orchestra's chief conductor. He was contractually committed to Los Angeles, but contemplated taking on the direction of both orchestras. He decided against it and Fritz Reiner was appointed as conductor in Pittsburgh.

In 1939, Klemperer began to suffer from serious balance problems. A potentially fatal brain tumour was diagnosed and he travelled to Boston for an operation to remove it. The operation was successful, but left him lame and partly paralysed on his right side. He had long had bipolar disorder (in the parlance of the time he was "manic depressive") and after the operation he went through an intense manic phase of the illness, which lasted for nearly three years and was followed by a long spell of severe depression. In 1941, after he walked out of a mental sanatorium in Rye, New York, the local police put out a bulletin, describing him as "dangerous and insane". He was found two days later in Morristown, New Jersey and appeared composed. A doctor who examined him said he was "temperamental and unstrung" but not dangerous, and he was released. The board of the Los Angeles Philharmonic terminated his contract, and his subsequent appearances were few, and seldom with prestigious ensembles, in Los Angeles or elsewhere. As her father struggled to support the family from his modest fees, Lotte worked in a factory to bring in some money.

=== Post-war ===
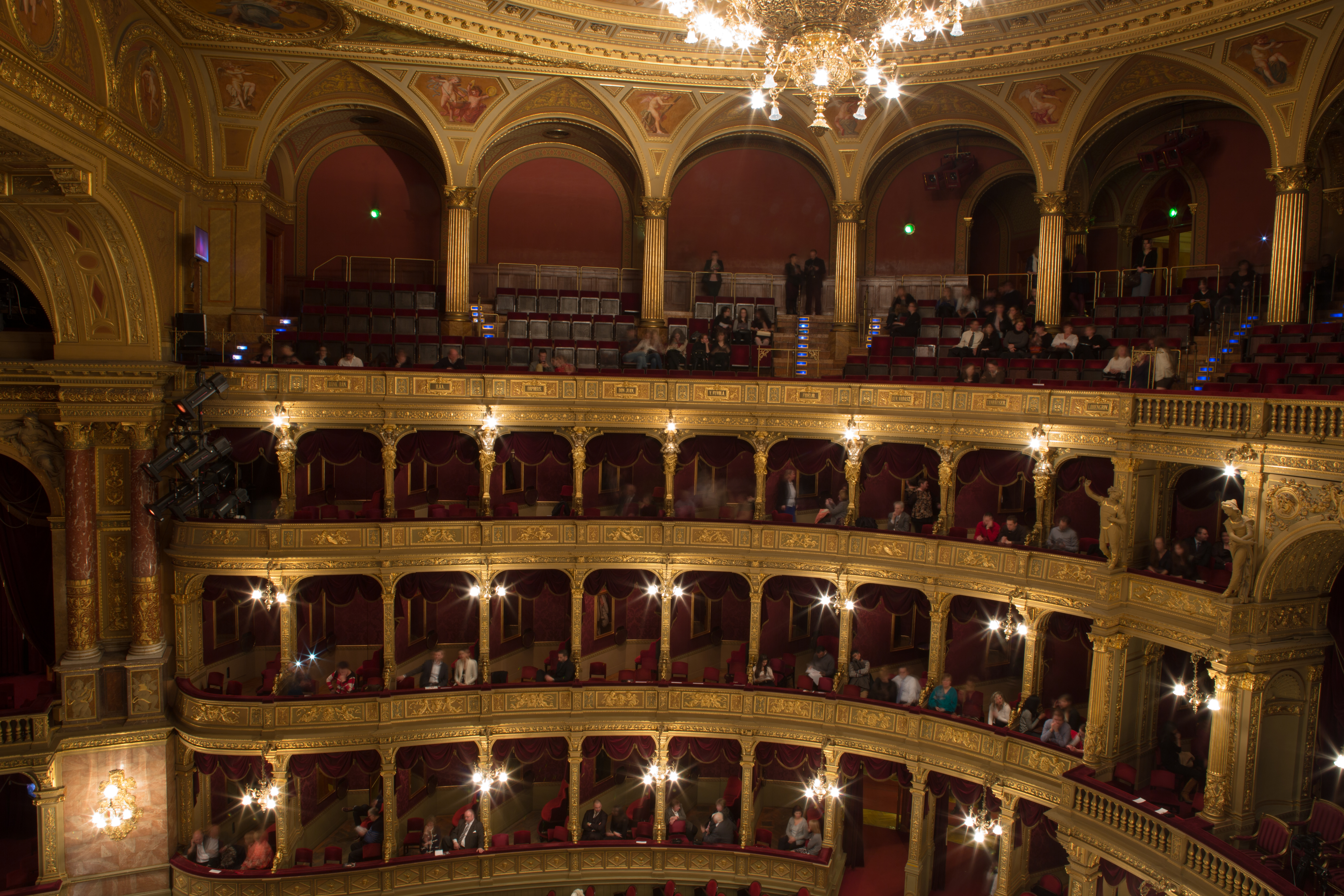
The Hungarian State Opera, where Klemperer was musical director, 1947–1950

By 1946, Klemperer had recovered his health enough to return to Europe for a conducting tour. His first concert was in Stockholm, where he met the music scholar Aladár Tóth, husband of the pianist Annie Fischer; Tóth was soon to be an important influence on his career. On another tour in 1947 Klemperer conducted The Marriage of Figaro at the Salzburg Festival and Don Giovanni in Vienna. While he was in Salzburg, Tóth, who had been appointed director of the Hungarian State Opera in Budapest, invited him to become the company's musical director. Klemperer accepted, and served from 1947 to 1950. In Budapest he conducted the major Mozart operas and Fidelio, Tannhäuser, Lohengrin and Die Meistersinger, as well as works from the Italian repertory, and many concerts.

In March 1948, Klemperer made his first post-war appearance in London, conducting the Philharmonia Orchestra. He conducted Bach's Third Orchestral Suite from the harpsichord, Stravinsky's Symphony in Three Movements and Beethoven's Eroica Symphony.

Klemperer left the Budapest post in 1950, frustrated by the political interference of the communist regime. He held no permanent conductorship for the next nine years. In the early 1950s he freelanced in Argentina, Australia, Austria, Britain, Canada, France, Germany and elsewhere. In London in 1951 he conducted two Philharmonia concerts at the new Royal Festival Hall, eliciting high praise from reviewers. The music critic of The Times wrote:

Rare indeed are the occasions when great music is allied to a performance that can claim to have taken its measure fully and unquestionably. Such an occasion was at the Festival Hall last night. ... Mr. Klemperer's grasp of the music's innermost significance was evident from the perfect fusion which he achieved of its dramatic, epic, and lyrical elements. Here, indeed, is a musician whose emotional intensity is wonderfully matched by an impressive intellectual force – the very combination which the classical Beethoven demands of his interpreter. ... Throughout the concert the orchestra met every demand of its inspired and inspiring conductor. (Note: The first concert was all-Beethoven: the Egmont Overture, the Emperor Concerto, with Myra Hess, and the Fifth Symphony. The second concert had a mixed programme: Walton's Scapino, Beethoven's Third Piano Concerto, with Solomon, and Mozart's Serenata notturna and Jupiter Symphony.)

After this, Klemperer's seemingly resurgent career received another severe set-back. At Montreal airport later in 1951 he slipped on ice and fell, breaking his hip. He was hospitalised for eight months. Then for a year he and his family were, as he put it, virtually prisoners in the US because of obstacles to leaving the country, following new legislation. With the help of an accomplished lawyer, he secured temporary six-month passports in 1954, and moved with his wife and daughter to Switzerland. (Note: His son, Werner, remained in the US, where he pursued a successful acting career, while remaining in close touch with his parents and sister, and visiting them in Europe.) He settled in Zürich, and obtained German citizenship and right of residency in Switzerland.

=== London ===
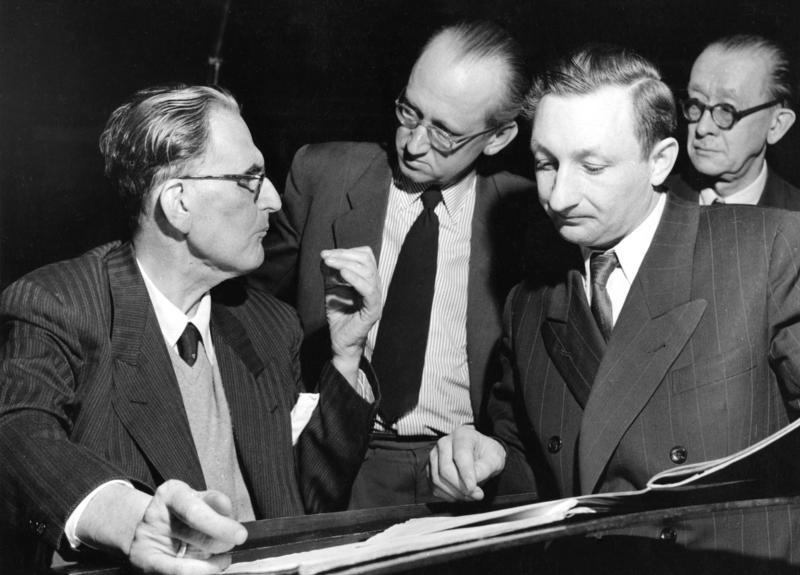
Klemperer, left, at a rehearsal in Cologne in 1954

From the mid-1950s, Klemperer's domestic base was in Zürich and his musical base in London, where his career became associated with the Philharmonia. It was widely regarded as the best orchestra in Britain in the 1950s: Grove's Dictionary of Music and Musicians described it as "an elite whose virtuosity transformed British concert life", and The Times called it "the Rolls-Royce of British orchestras". Its founder and proprietor, Walter Legge, engaged a range of prominent conductors for his concerts. By the early 1950s the one most closely identified with the orchestra was Herbert von Karajan, (Note: Some mistakenly supposed Karajan to have been the orchestra's principal conductor, but from the outset Legge had resisted appointing one.) but he was clearly the heir apparent to the ailing Furtwängler as chief conductor of the Berlin Philharmonic and the Salzburg Festival; (Note: Furtwängler died in November 1954, but protracted contractual negotiations meant that Karajan did not formally succeed him in Berlin and Salzburg until April 1956.) anticipating that Karajan would become unavailable to the Philharmonia, Legge built up a relationship with Klemperer, who was admired by the players, the critics and the public.

Legge was a senior producer for Columbia, part of the EMI recording group in the UK. As EMI paid for the rehearsals for recordings, Legge's concerts tended to feature works he had recorded immediately beforehand, so that the orchestra was fully rehearsed at no cost to him. (Note: A typical example occurred in late 1956, when Legge scheduled three Brahms symphonies for recording by Klemperer and the Philharmonia days before their live performances of the same works at the Festival Hall, so that the rehearsals paid for by Columbia for the recording sessions were effectively free rehearsals for his concerts.) This suited Klemperer, who though he disliked making recordings enjoyed the luxury of "hav[ing] time to prepare a work properly".

According to the critic William Mann, Klemperer's repertory by now was:

no longer the challenging progressive one of his younger days, but centred firmly on the German classics and romantics from Bach to Richard Strauss, with Beethoven as its centre and crown. ... London heard the superb, heaven-storming Beethoven cycles conducted by Klemperer in the 1950s, a series memorable particularly for spacious, perfectly proportioned architecture, strength and intensity and inner radiance of sonority, majesty of line.

In 1957, Legge launched the Philharmonia Chorus, which made its debut in Beethoven's Ninth Symphony conducted by Klemperer. In The Observer Heyworth wrote that with "what promises to be our best choir [and] our best orchestra and a great conductor", Legge had given London "a Beethoven cycle that any city in the world, be it Vienna or New York, would envy".

Wieland Wagner invited Klemperer to conduct Tristan und Isolde at the 1959 Holland Festival, and they agreed to collaborate on Die Meistersinger at Bayreuth, but neither plan was realised, because Klemperer suffered a further physical setback: in October 1958 while smoking in bed he set his bedclothes alight. His burns were life-threatening, and his recovery slow. It was not for nearly a year, until September 1959, that he recovered his health enough to conduct again. On Klemperer's return to the Philharmonia, Legge stood before the orchestra and appointed him conductor for life – the Philharmonia's first principal conductor. Klemperer's concerts in the 1960s included more works from outside the core German repertory, including Bartók's Divertimento, and symphonies by Berlioz, Dvořák, Mahler and Tchaikovsky.

Klemperer returned to opera in 1961, making his Covent Garden début in Fidelio for which he directed the staging as well as the music. He had to a considerable extent moved away from the experimental stagings of the Kroll years; the 1961 Fidelio was described as "traditional, unfussy, grandly conceived, and profoundly revealing", and of "deep serenity" musically. Klemperer directed and conducted another Fidelio in Zürich the following year, at the opera house, only a few hundred yards from his home. He battled with entrenched interests in the Zürich orchestra to secure the best players, but he succeeded and the performances were well received. At Covent Garden he later directed and conducted two more new productions: Die Zauberflöte (1962), and Lohengrin (1963), neither of which was as well reviewed as Fidelio.

=== Later years ===
During the early 1960s Legge became disenchanted with the orchestral music scene. His freedom to programme what he pleased was hampered by new committees at the Festival Hall and EMI, and his orchestra was less in demand in the studios. In March 1964, with no advance warning to the orchestra, he issued a press statement announcing that "after the fulfilment of its present commitments the activities of the Philharmonia Orchestra will be suspended for an indefinite period." Klemperer said that Legge had not warned him beforehand of the announcement, although Legge later maintained that he had done so. With Klemperer's strong support the players refused to be disbanded and formed themselves into a self-governing ensemble as the New Philharmonia Orchestra (NPO). They elected him as their president. He remained in the position until his retirement eight years later.

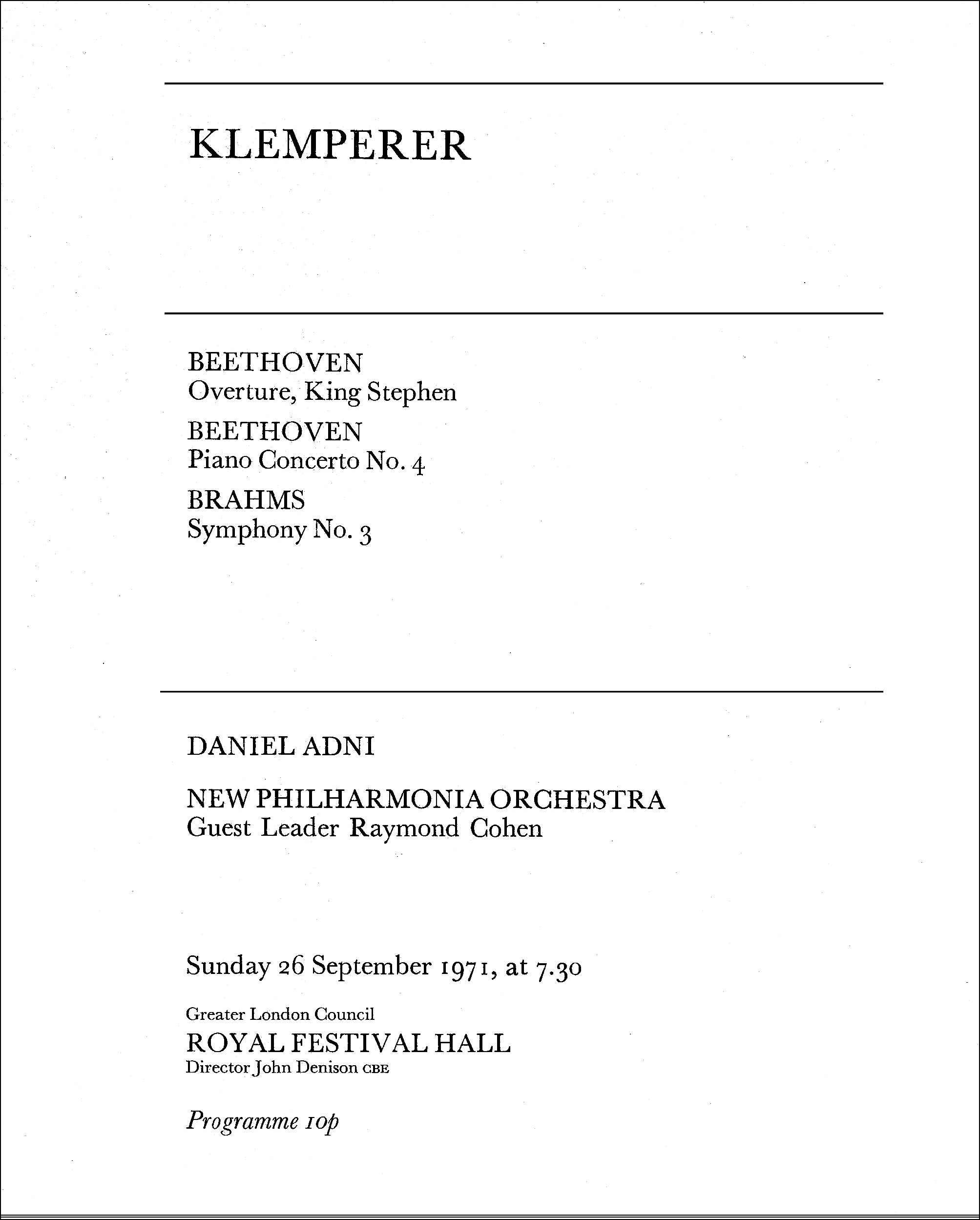
Programme for Klemperer's last concert, 1971

In his later years Klemperer returned to the Jewish faith, and was a strong supporter of the state of Israel. He visited his younger sister, who lived there, and while in Jerusalem in 1970 he accepted the offer of Israeli citizenship, though continuing to retain his German citizenship and permanent Swiss residency.

As Klemperer aged, his concentration and control of the orchestra declined. At one recording session he dozed off while conducting, and he found his hearing and eyesight under strain from concentrating for the length of a concert. One of his players told André Previn, "Sadly, he got a bit deaf and shaky. You'd be thinking 'poor old Klemperer', then suddenly the veil of infirmity would drop and he'd be wonderfully vigorous again." Klemperer continued to conduct and record with the New Philharmonia until the last concert of his career – at the Festival Hall on 26 September 1971 – and his final recording session two days later. The programme for the concert was Beethoven's King Stephen overture, and Fourth Piano Concerto, with Daniel Adni as soloist, and Brahms's Third Symphony. The recording, with the orchestra's wind players, was of Mozart's Serenade No. 11 in E flat, K. 375.

The following January, after flying from Zürich to London to conduct Bruckner's Seventh Symphony, Klemperer announced the day before the concert that he could no longer cope with the strain of public performances. (Note: The concert went ahead; Charles Groves deputised for Klemperer.) He hoped to be able to go on making recordings, as he felt he might be able to manage the shorter spans of recording takes, and intended to conduct Mozart's Die Entführung aus dem Serail and Bach's St John Passion for EMI, but neither plan came to fruition.

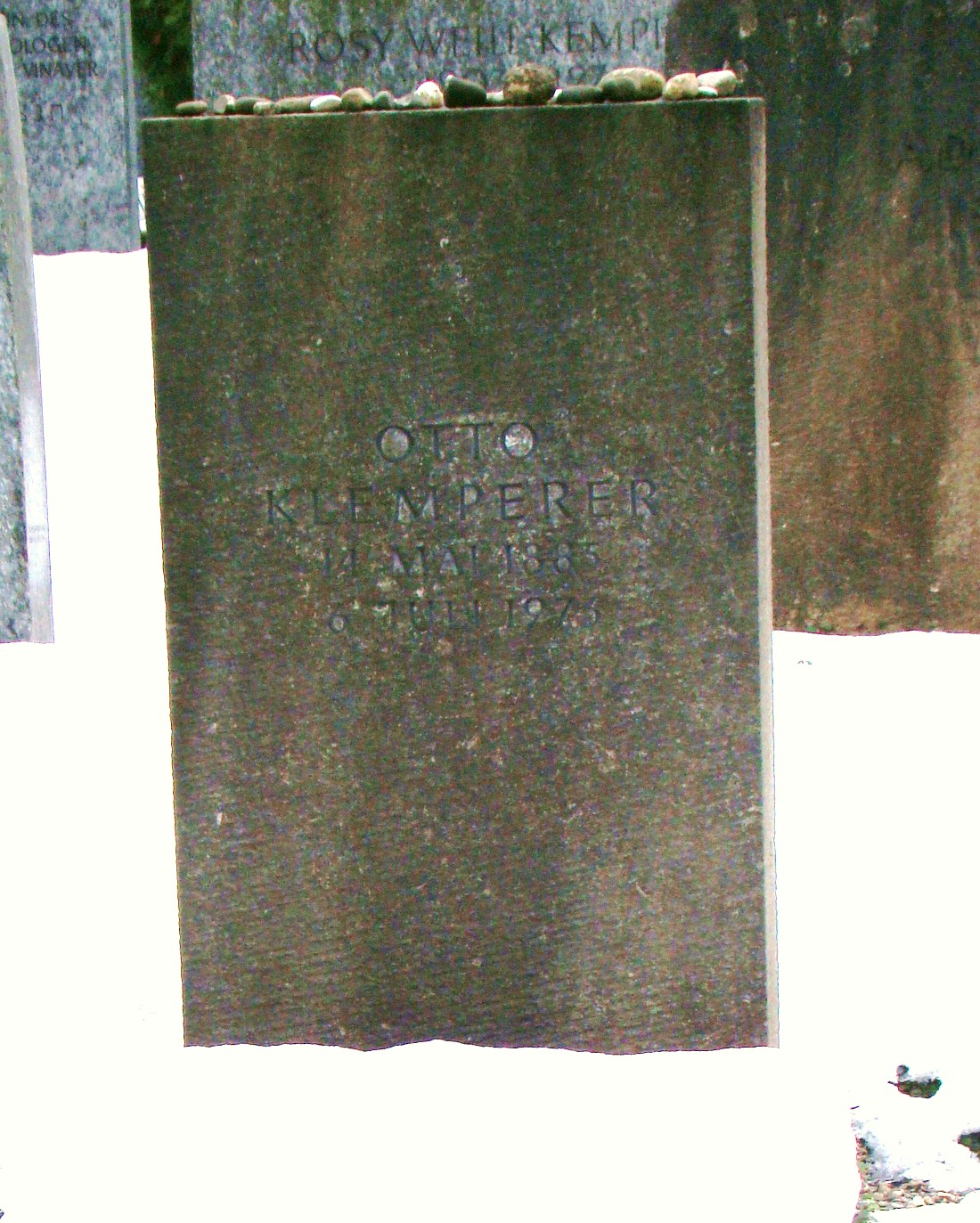
The grave in December 2009.

Heyworth writes about the conductor's last years:

During his time with the orchestra Klemperer won the affection of the players to a degree unprecedented in his career. The ready wit that lurked behind his forbidding exterior gave much pleasure. After a ragged entry during a rehearsal of Beethoven's Eighth Symphony, the principal cellist asked for "a clear beat at this point and we will get it together for the first time in musical history". "In British musical history", retorted Klemperer.

Klemperer retired to his home in Zürich, where he died in his sleep on 6 July 1973. His wife predeceased him and he was survived by their two children. He was buried in the Jewish cemetery at Friesenberg, Zürich, four days later.

== Compositions ==
Klemperer said, "I am mainly a conductor who also composes. Naturally, I would be glad to be remembered as a conductor and as a composer." German conductors of his generation began their careers when it was rare for a conductor not to compose: composition was seen as part of the traditional training of a kapellmeister. He began composing at an early age, and started writing songs in his mid-teens. He extensively revised some of his compositions and destroyed others.

Hearing Debussy's opera Pelléas et Mélisande in Prague in 1908 changed Klemperer's compositional ideas. He later viewed the music he composed after that as his first mature works. He continued to write songs, both orchestral and with piano – there were about 100 in all – and in about 1915 he wrote two operas, Wehen (meaning "labour pains") and Das Ziel (The Goal). Neither was publicly staged, although the composer conducted a private concert performance of Das Ziel in Berlin in 1931. The "Merry Waltz" from the latter is the best-known of his compositions. Of his nine string quartets, eight survive. EMI recorded the Seventh in 1970. In 1919 he composed a Missa Sacra for soloists, chorus and orchestra, and also a setting of Psalm 23.

Klemperer gave the premiere of his First Symphony with the Concertgebouw Orchestra in Amsterdam in 1961, and that of the final version of his Second with the New Philharmonia in 1969, recording it for EMI a few weeks later. He wrote six symphonies. Harold Schonberg, music critic of The New York Times, said that the First Symphony, with its incorporation of the Marseillaise in the second movement, "sounded like Charles Ives in one of his wilder moments". When the recording of the Second Symphony was issued in 1970, the critic Edward Greenfield wrote, "There is a gritty quality about much of Klemperer's fast music [with] sharp-edged unison passages ... but give Klemperer a slow tempo and he will melt with amazing rapidity ... the slow movement is astonishingly sweet, with one passage – clarinet over pizzicato strings – recalling the world of Lehár or even Viennese café music." The critic Meirion Bowen wrote of the same work that it was "the product of an outstanding conductor musing on the works of composers he has championed throughout his career".

== Recordings ==
Although he did not enjoy recording, Klemperer's discography is extensive. His first recording was an acoustic set of the slow movement of Bruckner's Eighth Symphony, made for Polydor in 1924 with the Staatskapelle Berlin. His early recordings include Beethoven symphonies and less characteristic repertoire including the first recording of Ravel's Alborada del gracioso, and "Nuages" and "Fêtes" from Debussy's Nocturnes (1926). (Note: When these early recordings were reissued in 1989 Gramophone magazine found the Ravel "energetic, highly rhythmic and perfectly idiomatic" and the Debussy "impressive too in its insights and mastery of style") Then, in between recordings of mostly German classics – including works by Brahms, Bruckner, Mendelssohn, Schubert, Richard Strauss and Wagner – he ventured into the light French repertoire with the overtures to Fra Diavolo and La belle Hélène (1929).

From the Los Angeles years there is only one purpose-made studio recording but several transcriptions of live radio broadcasts, ranging from symphonies by Beethoven, Bruckner and Dvořák to excerpts from operas by Gounod, Massenet, Puccini and Verdi. There are no commercial studio recordings from Klemperer's time in Budapest, but live performances in the opera house or on air were recorded and have been issued on CD, including complete sets of Lohengrin, Fidelio, The Magic Flute, The Tales of Hoffmann, Die Meistersinger and Così fan tutte, all sung in Hungarian.

For the Vox label Klemperer recorded several sets in Vienna in 1951, including Beethoven's Missa solemnis praised by Legge as "grave and powerful". In the same year his broadcast performances in the Concertgebouw of Mahler's Kindertotenlieder and Second Symphony, with the soloists Jo Vincent and Kathleen Ferrier, were recorded and have been issued on disc by Decca. During the 1950s many other live broadcasts conducted by Klemperer were recorded, and later published on CD, with orchestras including the Bavarian Radio Symphony, Concertgebouw, Cologne Radio Symphony, RIAS Symphony, Berlin and the Vienna Symphony.

In October 1954 Klemperer made the first of his many recordings with the Philharmonia: Mozart's Jupiter Symphony. ("Extremely impressive ... epic", commented The Gramophone, "carried through unfalteringly to the end.") Between then and 1972 he conducted the orchestra, and its successor, the New Philharmonia, in recordings of nearly two hundred different works. With the original Philharmonia they included more Mozart symphonies, complete symphony cycles of Beethoven and Brahms, symphonies by Berlioz, Mendelssohn, Schubert, Schumann, Bruckner, Dvořák, Tchaikovsky and Mahler, and other orchestral works by, among others, Bach, Johann Strauss, Richard Strauss, Stravinsky, Wagner and Weill.

From the choral repertoire he and the Philharmonia Chorus and Orchestra recorded Bach's St Matthew Passion, Handel's Messiah and Brahms's German Requiem. His complete opera recordings with the Philharmonia were Fidelio and The Magic Flute. Solo singers in these recordings included Dietrich Fischer-Dieskau, Gottlob Frick, Christa Ludwig, Peter Pears, Elisabeth Schwarzkopf and Jon Vickers.

After the players reconstituted themselves as the New Philharmonia in 1964 Klemperer worked extensively with them in the studios, recording eight symphonies by Haydn, three by Schumann, four by Bruckner and two by Mahler. A complete Beethoven piano concerto cycle featured Daniel Barenboim as soloist. The major choral recordings were of Beethoven's Missa solemnis and Bach's B minor Mass. Reviewing the former, Alec Robertson wrote that it "must take its place on the heights among the greatest recordings of our time". The Bach set divided critical opinion: Robertson called it "a spiritual experience ... a glorious achievement"; the Stereo Record Guide, though conceding "the majesty of Klemperer's conception", found it "disappointing ... with plodding tempi". There were four complete operas: Così fan tutte, Don Giovanni, Der fliegende Holländer and The Marriage of Figaro. Soloists included, among the women, Janet Baker, Teresa Berganza, Mirella Freni, Anja Silja and Elisabeth Söderström, and among the men, Theo Adam, Gabriel Bacquier, Geraint Evans, Nicolai Gedda and Nicolai Ghiaurov.

== Honours, legacy and reputation ==
=== Honours and legacy ===
In 1933 Klemperer was presented with the Goethe Medal by President Hindenburg in Berlin. He was awarded the Leipzig Orchestral Nikisch Prize in 1966, and held honorary degrees from Occidental College and the University of California, Los Angeles. In 1971 he was appointed an honorary member of the Royal Academy of Music in London. From Germany he held the Grand Medal of Merit with Star (1958) and the Order of Merit (1967).

The first movement from Klemperer's 1959 Philharmonia recording of Beethoven's Fifth Symphony was selected by NASA for inclusion on the Voyager Golden Record, sent into space on the Voyager space craft. The record contained sounds and images selected as examples of the diversity of life and culture on Earth.

In 1973 Lotte Klemperer presented the Royal Academy of Music with a collection of her father's books and marked-up scores, together with a portrait and some of his batons. This is now known as the Otto Klemperer Collection. One of the academy's two named professorships in conducting is the Klemperer Chair (currently, at 2023, held by Semyon Bychkov). (Note: The other, held (2023) by Sir Mark Elder, is the Barbirolli Chair.)

=== Reputation ===
The Washington Post's music critic Joseph McLellan wrote when Klemperer died, "An age of giants has ended ... They are all gone: Toscanini, Walter, Furtwängler, Beecham, Szell, Reiner, and, now Klemperer." The Times said that in Britain he had been revered as the greatest of living conductors. In the view of Grove's Dictionary, following Toscanini's retirement in April 1954 and Furtwängler's death seven months later, Klemperer was "generally accepted as the most authoritative interpreter of the central Austro-German repertory".

Many musicians disagreed with Klemperer's way of conducting Mozart. Sir Neville Cardus of The Guardian observed, "It was not for him the gallant Mozart presented by Sir Thomas Beecham; far from it. Klemperer's Mozart was made of sterner stuff." Mann complained that the conductor's direction of The Marriage of Figaro was "didactic, humourless, tortoise-like", though his colleague Stanley Sadie found "Klemperer's leisured, cool, almost dispassionate view of the opera is not without its attractiveness. ... The deliberation and the poise are not what we are used to in Figaro, and they say something about it which is worth hearing." It was not only in Mozart that Klemperer's tempi attracted adverse comment: a frequent criticism in his later years was that his tempi were slow. The EMI producer Suvi Raj Grubb wrote:

The complete answer to this was provided by Klemperer himself when it was suggested to him at the recording session that the Peasants Merrymaking of the Pastoral Symphony was too slow. "You will get used to it." ... Every tempo of Klemperer's is carefully related to his interpretation of the whole work − you never feel that a particular tempo has been selected merely for effect.

Cardus expressed regret that Klemperer had too rarely been allowed to programme Bruckner, "whose symphonies he encompassed with a grip and a vision which saw the end of a large musical shape in the beginning". Cardus added:

Towards the end of his life his beat became more and more unyielding. Never a colourist, his treatment of texture tended to produce a black-and-white neutrality of tone. He almost took the schmalz out of Mahler.

It was as a Beethoven conductor that Klemperer became most celebrated. The Record Guide said of the 1951 recording of the Missa solemnis, "it is seldom that we hear in the concert hall a performance so clear, so fervent and so musical as that which Klemperer has achieved ... [with] the impression of sublimity achieved by this splendid performance." Of his contemporaneous recording of the Fifth Symphony, the same writers called it "a really individual reading", preferable to those of Toscanini, Walter or Erich Kleiber: "Klemperer treats the work as if he had just discovered its greatness, illuminating every page with a ceaseless care for detail." Mann wrote of the 1962 recording of Fidelio, "the performance is so stunning that after it operagoers may almost despair of hearing a Fidelio that will not prove a disappointment." The Philharmonia's first horn, Alan Civil, said, "It took a Klemperer to throw fresh light on Beethoven, and I found his Beethoven cycles marvellous. I mean, I don't want to play Beethoven with any other conductor", and a colleague from the orchestra said, "It's as though Beethoven himself were standing there."

== Notes, references and sources ==
=== Sources ===
- Canarina, John (2003). Pierre Monteux, Maître. Pompton Plains, New Jersey: Amadeus Press. ISBN 978-1-57467-082-0.
- Cook, Susan C. (1988). Opera for a New Republic. Ann Arbor: UMI Research Press. ISBN 978-0-83571-811-0.
- Furlong, William Barry (1974). Season with Solti: A Year in the Life of the Chicago Symphony. New York: Macmillan. ISBN 978-0-02542-000-7.
- Haltrecht, Montague (1975). The Quiet Showman: Sir David Webster and the Royal Opera House. London: Collins. ISBN 978-0-00211-163-8.
- Heyworth, Peter (1985) [1973]. Conversations with Klemperer (second ed.). London: Faber and Faber. ISBN 978-0-57113-561-5.
- Heyworth, Peter (1996) [1983]. Otto Klemperer: Volume 1, 1885–1933. Cambridge: Cambridge University Press. ISBN 978-0-52149-509-7.
- Heyworth, Peter (1996). Otto Klemperer: Volume 2, 1933–1973. Cambridge: Cambridge University Press. ISBN 978-0-52124-488-6.
- Hunt, John; Pettitt, Stephen (2009). Philharmonia Orchestra: Complete Discography 1945–1987. London: Travis and Emery. ISBN 978-1-90685-716-5.
- Johnson, Noel D.; Mark Koyama (2019). Persecution and Toleration: The Long Road to Religious Freedom. Cambridge: Cambridge University Press. ISBN 978-1-10842-502-5.
- Keene, Ann T. (1990). "Klemperer, Otto". American National Biography. Vol. 12. New York: Oxford University Press. ISBN 978-0-19520-635-7.
- Keller, Hans (1957). "Otto Klemperer". In Keller, Hans; Donald Mitchell (eds.). Milein Cosman: Musical Sketchbook. Oxford: Bruno Cassirer. OCLC 3225493.
- Kennedy, Michael (1971). Barbirolli, Conductor Laureate: The Authorised Biography. London: MacGibbon and Key. ISBN 978-0-26163-336-0.
- Lebrecht, Norman (1998). Mahler Remembered. London: Faber and Faber. ISBN 978-0-57114-692-5.
- March, Ivan, ed. (1967). The Great Records. Blackpool: Long Playing Record Library. OCLC 555041974.
- March, Ivan, ed. (1977). The Penguin Stereo Record Guide (second ed.). London: Penguin. ISBN 978-0-14046-223-4.
- Nichols, Roger (2011). Ravel. New Haven: Yale University Press. ISBN 978-0-30010-882-8.
- Osborne, Charles; Ken Thomson (1980). Klemperer Stories: Anecdotes, Sayings and Impressions of Otto Klemperer. London: Robson Books. ISBN 978-0-86051-098-7.
- Osborne, Richard (1998). Herbert von Karajan. London: Chatto & Windus. ISBN 978-0-70116-714-1.
- Pettitt, Stephen (1985). Philharmonia Orchestra: A Record of Achievement 1945–1985. London: Robert Hale. ISBN 978-0-70902-371-5.
- Previn, André (1979). Orchestra. London: Macdonald and Jane's. ISBN 978-0-35404-420-2.
- Reid, Charles (1968). Malcolm Sargent: A Biography. London: Hamish Hamilton. ISBN 9780800850807. OCLC 500563931.
- Sackville-West, Edward; Desmond Shawe-Taylor (1955). The Record Guide. London: Collins. OCLC 500373060.
- Schwarzkopf, Elisabeth (1982). On and Off the Record: A Memoir of Walter Legge. London: Faber and Faber. ISBN 978-0-57111-928-8.
