= David Hermann =

German-French stage director

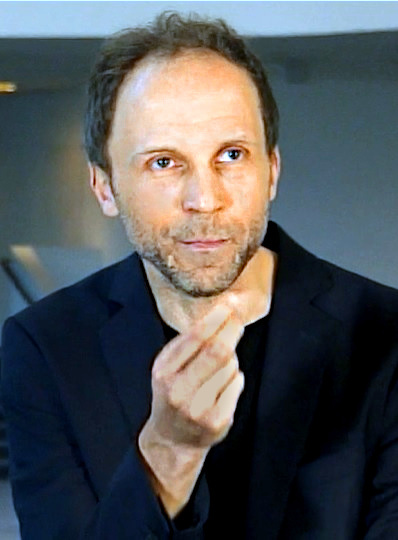
- Born: 1977 (age 47–48); Würzburg
- Education: Hochschule für Musik Hanns Eisler
- Occupation: Stage director

David Hermann (born 1977) is a German-French stage director focused on opera. In 2006, Hermann was the youngest stage director at the Salzburg Festival, and he has directed operas at major opera houses in Europe.

== Career ==
Born in Würzburg, Hermann studied stage directing at the Hochschule für Musik Hanns Eisler in Berlin. He worked as an assistant of Hans Neuenfels. In 2000, he was awarded the first prize of the Internationaler Wettbewerb für Regie und Bühnenbild (International competition for direction and stage set) in Graz. He staged a cycle of three Monteverdi operas at Opera Frankfurt.

Hermann made his debut at the Salzburg Festival with a production of Mozart's Ascanio in Alba in 2006, then at age 29 as the youngest director at the festival. He directed Verdi's Rigoletto at the Deutsche Oper am Rhein in 2009, and the same year at the festival Ruhrtriennale the premiere of Sing für mich, Tod! A ritual for Claude Vivier by Albert Ostermaier to music by Claude Vivier. He directed Honegger's Jeanne d'Arc au bûcher at the Theater Basel, and Verdi's Macbeth at the Aalto Theatre in Essen. He staged at the Deutsche Oper Berlin first in 2012 Helmut Lachenmann's Das Mädchen mit den Schwefelhölzern and then Janáček's Věc Makropulos. He directed for the Badisches Staatstheater Karlsruhe Les Troyens by Berlioz, Mussorgsky's Boris Godunov, and in 2016 Wagner's Das Rheingold. He staged Dvořák's Rusalka in Saarbrücken and Verdi's La traviata at the Zürich Opera. In 2017, he staged three short operas by Ernst Krenek, connecting them to Drei Opern (Three operas) in a different order from the 1928 premiere at the Mai-Woche Wiesbaden: he showed after Der Diktator first Schwergewicht, oder Die Ehre der Nation, and then Das geheime Königreich, interpreting the works as parables on power and its abuse. A reviewer noted the followed the music as a mix of tragedy, farce and fairy-tale about politics and culture ("... eine fabelhafte Mischung von Tragödie, Farce und Märchen über Politik und Kultur").

Hermann also worked in Europe for the Dutch National Opera in Amsterdam, the Vlaamse Opera in Antwerp, the Opéra national de Lorraine in Nancy, and the Teatro Real in Madrid.
