= Joseph Rosenstock =

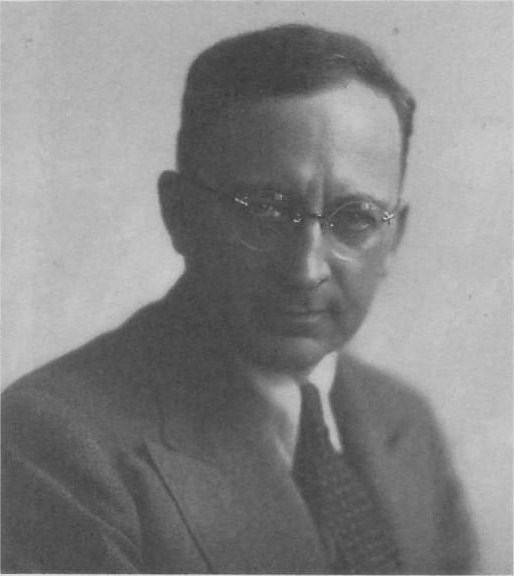

Background information
- Born: 1895-01-27; Kraków
- Died: 1985-10-17 (aged 90) New York City
- Genres: Opera
- Occupation: Conductor

Joseph Rosenstock (Polish: Józef Rosenstock, German: Josef Rosenstock; 27 January 1895 in Kraków – 17 October 1985 in New York City) was an American conductor.

== Career ==
=== Early years ===
He worked at the State Theatre in Darmstadt, where, on 12 April 1923, he conducted Hagith by Karol Szymanowski, and at the State Opera in Wiesbaden, where, on 6 May 1928, he conducted the premiere of three short operas by Ernst Krenek: Der Diktator, Das geheime Königreich, and Schwergewicht, oder Die Ehre der Nation, as part of the Maifestwoche festival. He was brought into the Metropolitan Opera in New York City to replace Artur Bodanzky in 1928. However, he received such poor critical reviews that he himself resigned after only six performances and Bodanzky was brought back.

=== Jüdischer Kulturbund, 1933–1936 ===
Returning to Germany, he worked in Mannheim and, from 1933 to 1936, as conductor of the Berlin Jüdischer Kulturbund, notably conducting the (all-Jewish) German premiere of Verdi's Nabucco on 4 April 1935.

=== Tokyo, 1936–1946 ===
Rosenstock left Berlin in 1936 and moved to Japan to conduct the Japan Symphony Orchestra (which had been founded in 1926 and became the NHK Symphony Orchestra in 1951). He remained in Tokyo until 1946 and, while he was there, he taught Hideo Saito (conductor, educator and co-founder of the Toho Gakuen School of Music), Masashi Ueda (conductor of the Tokyo Symphony Orchestra, who introduced contemporary Russian, American and Japanese music to the public), and Roh Ogura how to conduct Beethoven's symphonies.

=== New York, 1948–1969 ===
In 1948 Rosenstock returned to New York to work as a conductor with the New York City Opera (NYCO), debuting with Le nozze di Figaro. In 1951, he notably conducted the world premieres of David Tamkin's The Dybbuk.

In January 1952 Rosenstock succeeded Laszlo Halász as General Director of the NYCO. He served in that post for four seasons, continuing Halász's innovative programming of unusual repertoire mixed with standard works. He led the world premiere of Aaron Copland's The Tender Land, the New York premiere of William Walton's Troilus and Cressida, and the United States premieres of Gottfried von Einem's The Trial and Béla Bartók's Bluebeard's Castle. Rosenstock was also the first NYCO director to include musical theater in the company's repertoire with a 1954 production of Jerome Kern and Oscar Hammerstein II's Show Boat. This decision was ridiculed by the press but Rosenstock felt justified as the production played to a packed house. Meanwhile, the company's production of Donizetti's opera Don Pasquale that season only sold 35 percent of the house seats.

Rosenstock returned to the Met on 31 January 1961 to conduct Tristan und Isolde and became a regular member of the Met conducting staff until his last performance conducting Die Meistersinger on 13 February 1969. During those eight years, he conducted 248 performances at the Metropolitan Opera, including a number of Metropolitan Opera radio broadcast performances.

Preceded by Niklaus Aeschbacher	Principal Conductors, NHK Symphony Orchestra; 1956–1957	Succeeded by Wilhelm Loibner
