= Claus Helmut Drese =

German Opera and theatre manager (1922–2011)

Claus Helmut Drese (25 December 1922, in Aachen – 10 February 2011, in Horgen, Switzerland) was a German opera and theatre administrator, and author.

== Early career ==
Drese began his career as a dramaturg at the Marburger Schauspielhaus in 1946. From 1952 to 1959, he was chief dramaturg and director at the Mannheim National Theatre. He was a theatre director in Heidelberg from 1959 to 1962. From 1962 to 1968, he was director of the Hessisches Staatstheater Wiesbaden and gained prominence by inviting several theatre companies from Eastern Europe to the Internationale Maifestspiele Wiesbaden. In 1968, he became Generalintendant for opera and theatre in Cologne. There, he first collaborated with Jean-Pierre Ponnelle. In 1975, he became artistic director of the Zurich Opera House, where his achievements included productions of Monteverdi's operas conducted by Nikolaus Harnoncourt and staged by Ponnelle.

== Vienna State Opera ==
In 1984, Austrian culture minister Helmut Zilk designated Drese as director of the Vienna State Opera in Vienna. Drese began his tenure in 1986 and chose Claudio Abbado as the State Opera's music director. In the following five years, the State Opera experienced a very fruitful period. Abbado conducted both new productions and revivals, among them Un ballo in maschera (staged by Gianfranco de Bosio, designed by Emmanuele Luzzati), L'Italiana in Algeri (staged and designed by Ponnelle), Carmen (revival of the 1978 Franco Zeffirelli-production), Pelléas et Mélisande (staged by Antoine Vitez and designed by Yannis Kokkos), Il viaggio a Reims (staged by Luca Ronconi and designed by Gae Aulenti), Don Carlo (staged and designed by Pier Luigi Pizzi), Don Giovanni (staged by Luc Bondy, with Ruggero Raimondi as the Don), Le nozze di Figaro (staged by Jonathan Miller). Drese initiated cycle of all the major Mozart-operas.

Drese also engaged conductors who had never conducted at the State Opera before, such as Harnoncourt (Idomeneo in 1987, followed by Die Zauberflöte staged by Otto Schenk in 1988, Die Entführung aus dem Serail and Così fan tutte in 1989), Colin Davis (Werther staged by Pierluigi Samaritani), Die Meistersinger von Nürnberg), Seiji Ozawa (Eugene Onegin in 1988; a critically acclaimed production with Mirella Freni and Nicolai Ghiaurov).

== Criticism, dismissal and aftermath ==
Though Drese's term was internationally acknowledged as a very successful one, he received criticism for aspects of his work, such as excessive expenditure on 'star' opera singers. In June 1988, just days after the acclaimed first night of Pellèas et Mélisande, then Social Democratic culture minister Hilde Hawlicek met with Drese. She told him that his contract was not to be extended after 1991 and presented him his successors, Eberhard Wächter and Ioan Holender. Drese contemplated about resigning immediately, but finally chose to fulfill his contract. His final premiere in June 1991 was Der ferne Klang by Franz Schreker, conducted by Gerd Albrecht and staged by Jürgen Flimm. Ultimately, Drese's ideas to secure the State Opera's independence from the other state theatres were realized years later by his successor Holender, in addition to his idea of establishing longer running series of performances.

== Bibliography ==
- Drese, Claus Helmut (1984). Theater, Theater... Vorträge, Aufsätze, Kommentare eines Intendanten. Zürich: Atlantis-Musikbuch. ISBN 3-254-00109-5.
- Drese, Claus Helmut (1993). Im Palast der Gefühle: Erfahrungen und Enthüllungen eines Wiener Operndirektors. München: Piper. ISBN 3-492-03695-3.
- Drese, Claus Helmut (1999). aus Vorsatz und durch Zufall: Theater- und Operngeschichte(n) aus 50 Jahren. Köln: Dittrich. ISBN 3-920862-24-4.
- Drese, Claus Helmut (2002). Nachklänge: fünf Künstlerschicksale; Erzählungen. Köln: Dittrich. ISBN 3-920862-44-9.
