= Tarquin (opera) =

Opera by Ernst Krenek

- Chamber opera by Ernst Krenek
- Librettist: Emmet Lavery
- Language: English
- Premiere: 1950; Cologne

Tarquin is a chamber opera by Ernst Krenek to an English libretto by Emmet Lavery. Written in 1940, it is Krenek's only unpublished opera (Op. 90), though a premiere in German translation (by M.-C. Schulte-Strathaus & P. Funk rather than the composer) took place in 1950 in Cologne.

== History ==
Krenek, an Austrian who was in Switzerland at the time of the Anschluss, escaped to exile in the USA and a teaching position at Vassar College, where Lavery (1902–86) was a newspaper editor in neighboring Poughkeepsie (he would later run for Congress and write for Hollywood). The piece was designed for college workshops and used six instruments (violin, clarinet, trumpet, percussion and two pianos) but the twelve-tone music still proved beyond the reach of potential performers; only two scenes were given at Vassar on 13 May 1941.

If the title character in Der Diktator and Agamemnon in Leben des Orest were inspired by Benito Mussolini, Tarquin's title character can be seen as a caricature of Adolf Hitler (albeit with a complicated inner life) as well as a modern incarnation of his namesake Sextus Tarquinius. Lucretia's counterpart is the devout Corinna. A prologue set in 1925 shows them as students, he the protegee of the Archbishop and still using his real name, Marius. The action resumes in an indefinite near future, when Tarquin has made himself dictator and Corinna has ties to a clandestine radio station. He is brought back to God only after tragedy has engulfed them both.

Stewart is harsh in his assessment of the text ("It would be charitable to suppose that Krenek was not yet sufficiently acquainted with English to appreciate the awfulness of such lines") and Krenek may have been embarrassed for another reason, later writing: "It fitted in well to the line of religiously flavored political thinking that I had developed." In Karl V, he had espoused a universal Catholicism as an antidote to fascist nationalism, but later scoffed at the idea of his having converted: "When the assassin is trying the front door lock, it's time to barricade oneself in the attic without asking how leaky the roof may be."

Tarquin was followed by three more "essays for an American music theatre" to Krenek's own libretti, but his McCarthy opera, Pallas Athene weint, was commissioned by the Hamburg State Opera, and his late works were all written for European venues.

== Roles ==
- Marius (baritone)
- Corinna (soprano)
- Cleon (tenor)
- Der Erzbischof (bass)
- Der Kanzler (tenor)
- 4 speaking roles and ensemble
