= What Price Confidence? =

Opera by Ernst Krenek

What Price Confidence
- Chamber opera by Ernst Krenek
- Description: "little drawing room comedy"
- Librettist: Krenek
- Language: English
- Premiere: 23 May 1962; Theater Saarbrücken

What Price Confidence? (translated as Vertrauenssache, or A Matter of Trust) is a chamber opera in nine scenes with music and libretto by Ernst Krenek, his Op. 111. This "little drawing room comedy" is set in London at the turn of the 20th century, and features a protagonist not unlike Max in Jonny spielt auf, as the author points out in a preface; it owes something to Melville as well (specifically "The Confidence-Man"), as do his next two operas.

Composed during the winter of 1944–45 in St. Paul, it was Krenek's second attempt at an American opera and employed only four singers and piano. It shared the fate of Tarquin in only reaching a belated premiere in Germany (Saarbrücken, 23 May 1962), but this time Krenek was sufficiently satisfied with his work to publish it with Bärenreiter (BA 4301), remarking that the Met singers who requested a touring piece simply couldn't find time for a hoped-for performance. It is now given fairly often.

== Roles ==
Role	Voice type	Premiere Cast, 23 May 1962 (Conductor: )
Edwin	baritone	
Gloria	soprano	
Richard	tenor	
Vivian	mezzo-soprano	

== Synopsis ==
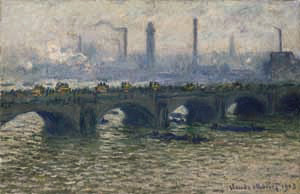
Monet's painting of Waterloo Bridge, the setting for scene vi.

Time: Turn of the 20th Century
Place: London

Gloria is upbraiding Edwin for his suspicious nature: "You dont even trust yourself!" He resolves to give his entire trust to the next person who asks for it, as a kind of experiment to determine whether she is faithful. Meanwhile, Richard is perturbed by Vivian's complete lack of jealousy. "I have every confidence- in myself...If I wern't myself, I dont know that I should trust you". After he leaves she admits some doubt and resolves on a life or death experiment to see if she can fill another with the same confidence.

Beneath the Diplodocus tail in the British Museum, Gloria sets one condition before she will go to Paris with Richard: he must first awaken Edwin's sense of confidence. He meets Edwin (who doesn't know him) at a club and forces him to accept a check for £1,000 as a gambling debt, and then hurries back to the dinosaur. Gloria is at first incredulous (of course) and then horrified, insisting that he at least cover the check. Meanwhile, Vivian finds Edwin about to jump from Waterloo Bridge, the check having bounced. She tells him of her own decision to jump unless she can lend him confidence, and persuades him that their meeting was fate's true answer to his question. He agrees to call the next day. Richard searches for Vivian's jewellery by candlelight, barely succeeding before she comes in. The next day Edwin announces he's going out to tea, and Gloria is astonished to feel a pang of jealousy.

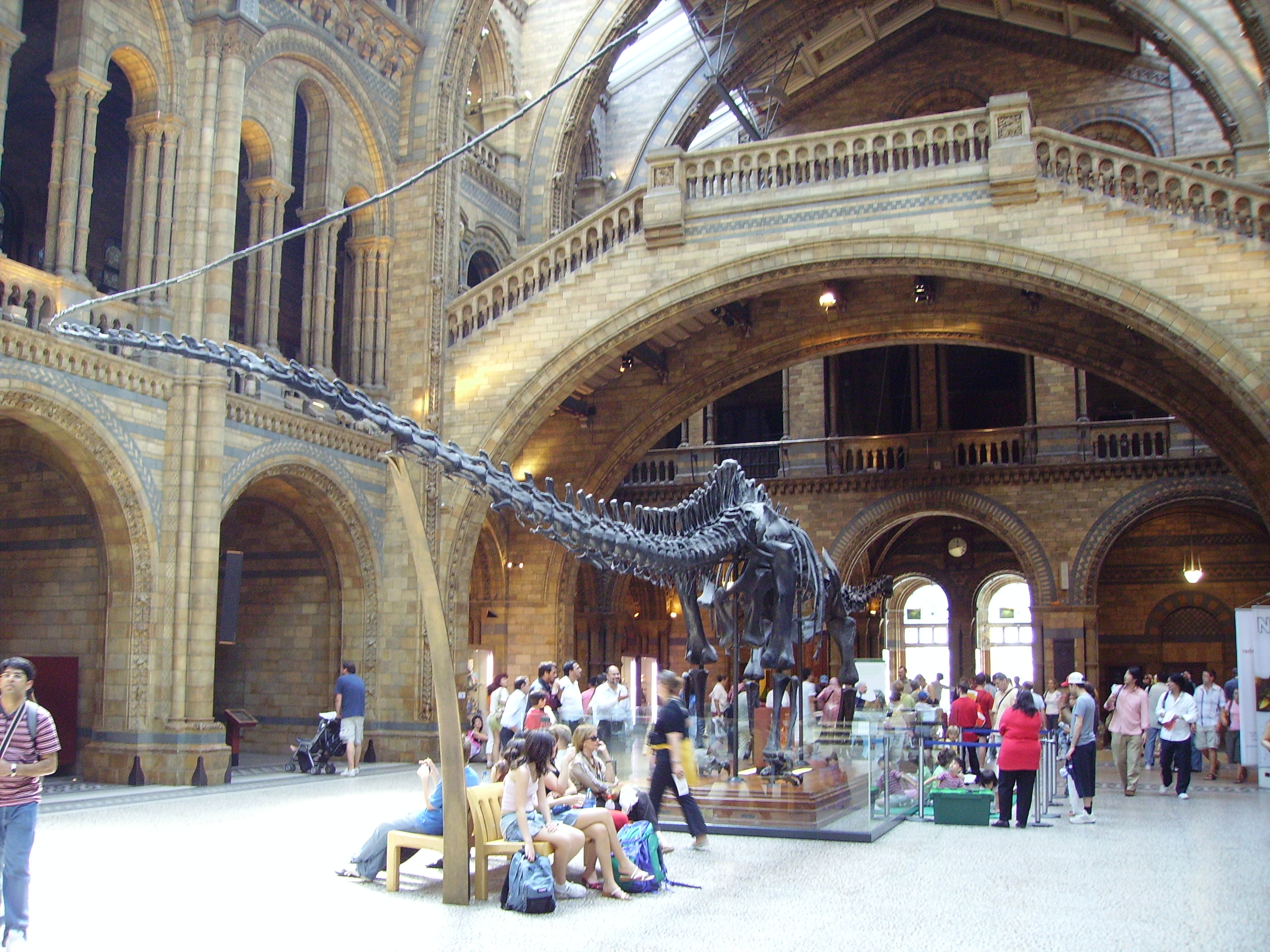
The Natural History Museum, in 1945 still part of the British Museum

Vivian quizzes Richard about the missing jewellery she wanted to put on, having guessed why he was holding a candle the night before. When she hears about a check for £1,000 she is struck by the coincidence, just as Richard is surprised to see Edwin approach the gate. Vivian demands the pawn check and hides him, then welcomes Edwin and invites him to withdraw to another chamber. Gloria arrives, having tailed Edwin, in time to join Richard's jealous tirade. The other two emerge and introductions are made, the check is exchanged for the pawnticket, Edwin expresses his desire to see Paris, and Vivian her intention to join him. "There's nothing so precious as confidence!" "Yes...of course...but who will pay the price?"
