= Das geheime Königreich =

Opera by Ernst Krenek

Das geheime Königreich Märchenoper in 1 Akt
- Opera by Ernst Krenek
- Translation: The Secret Kingdom
- Librettist: Krenek
- Language: German
- Premiere: 6 May 1928; Mai-Festwoche Wiesbaden

Das geheime Königreich (The Secret Kingdom) is an opera in one act with words and music by Ernst Krenek, his Op. 50 and the second of three one-acters (with Der Diktator and Schwergewicht, oder Die Ehre der Nation) which premiered on 6 May 1928 at the Hessisches Staatstheater Wiesbaden as part of the Mai-Festwoche Wiesbaden. It is subtitled Märchenoper in 1 Akt (fairy-tale opera in one act) and has been called a satirical fairy-tale opera.

== History ==
A note to the press by the publisher Universal Editio (UE), probably from the end of 1927 and entitled Ein Einakter-Zyklus (A cycle of one-acters) announces that Ernst Krenek composed three one-act operas after the success of Jonny spielt auf, to be premiered together at the Festspiele Wiesbaden of 1928. Das geheime Königreich is listed as the second of the three, and described as a satirical fairy-tale (Satirisches Märchen). The premiere of the three operas was part of the Mai-Festwoche at the Hessisches Staatstheater Wiesbaden on 6 May 1928. It was the first festival after 1914.

== Roles ==
Role	Voice type	Premiere cast, 6 May 1928 Conductor: Joseph Rosenstock
King	baritone	Karl Köther
Queen	coloratura soprano	Anny van Kruyswyk
Jester	baritone	Heinrich Hölzlin
Rebel	tenor	Eyvind Laholm
3 Singing Ladies	soprano, mezzo-soprano, contralto	Therese Müller-Reichel, Bommers, L. Haas
First Revolutionary	tenor buffo	Heinrich Schorn
Second Revolutionary	bass buffo	Mechler
Guard	tenor	

== Performances and recordings ==
Das geheime Königreich was recorded in 1999, conducted by Marek Janowski, with Michael Kraus as the King and Claudia Barainsky as the Queen. The opera was coupled with Erich Korngold's Der Ring des Polykrates at the Lübeck Opera in 2012. A reviewer described the music as intellectual and musical fireworks ("intellektuelles und musikalisches Feuerwerk"), with music at the same time ambitious and effective. He notes similarities to Shakespeare's The Tempest and Mozart's Die Zauberflöte, with a King who wants to resign after a revolution, and his Jester, and a Queen who falls in love with a revolutionary leader, and is turned into a tree. The same year, it was performed at the Semperoper in Dresden. A reviewer notes the stories ending about the divinity of a simple creature, and the more complex and darker dimensions ("komplexere, dunklere Dimension") below this surface.

The opera was performed, along with its companion pieces by the Oper Frankfurt on 30 April 2017, entitled Drei Opern (Three operas). The stage director, David Hermann, placed it at the end of the evening, making the King the person who started as the Dictator in the first opera. The conductor was Lothar Zagrosek.

== Literature ==
- Stewart, John, Ernst Krenek, The Man and His Music, University of California Press, 1991. ISBN 0-520-07014-3 ISBN 0-520-07014-3
- Das geheime Königreich / Märchenoper in einem Akt, Opera Guide
- Matthew Lynch: Krenek's neglected opera Das geheime Königreich brought to life in Dresden, bachtrack.com 28 October 2012
