= Sardakai =

Opera by Ernst Krenek

- Comic opera by Ernst Krenek
- Librettist: Krenek
- Language: German
- Premiere: 1970; Hamburg State Opera

Sardakai, Op. 206, is a 1969 comic opera in two acts by Ernst Krenek which premiered in Hamburg in 1970. The "lightweight, fluffy farce", as Krenek described it, dealt with a Così fan tutte inspired scenario on the fictional South Seas island of Migo Migo. Krenek's libretto was intended to poke fun at both left and right wing "sacred cows". The premiere was a catastrophe, attributed by some contemporary and subsequent commentators to the Hamburg Opera director's decision to commission Krenek, who was living in California, to write his own libretto which proved to be out of touch with both the prevailing mood in Germany, and the situation at the Hamburg Opera.

== Recording ==
- Ksenija Lukic, Egbert Junghanns, Markus Köhler, Jörg Dürmüller, Rundfunk-Sinfonieorchester Berlin, Reinhard Schmiedel, Capriccio 2CD 2000
