= Pierluigi Samaritani =

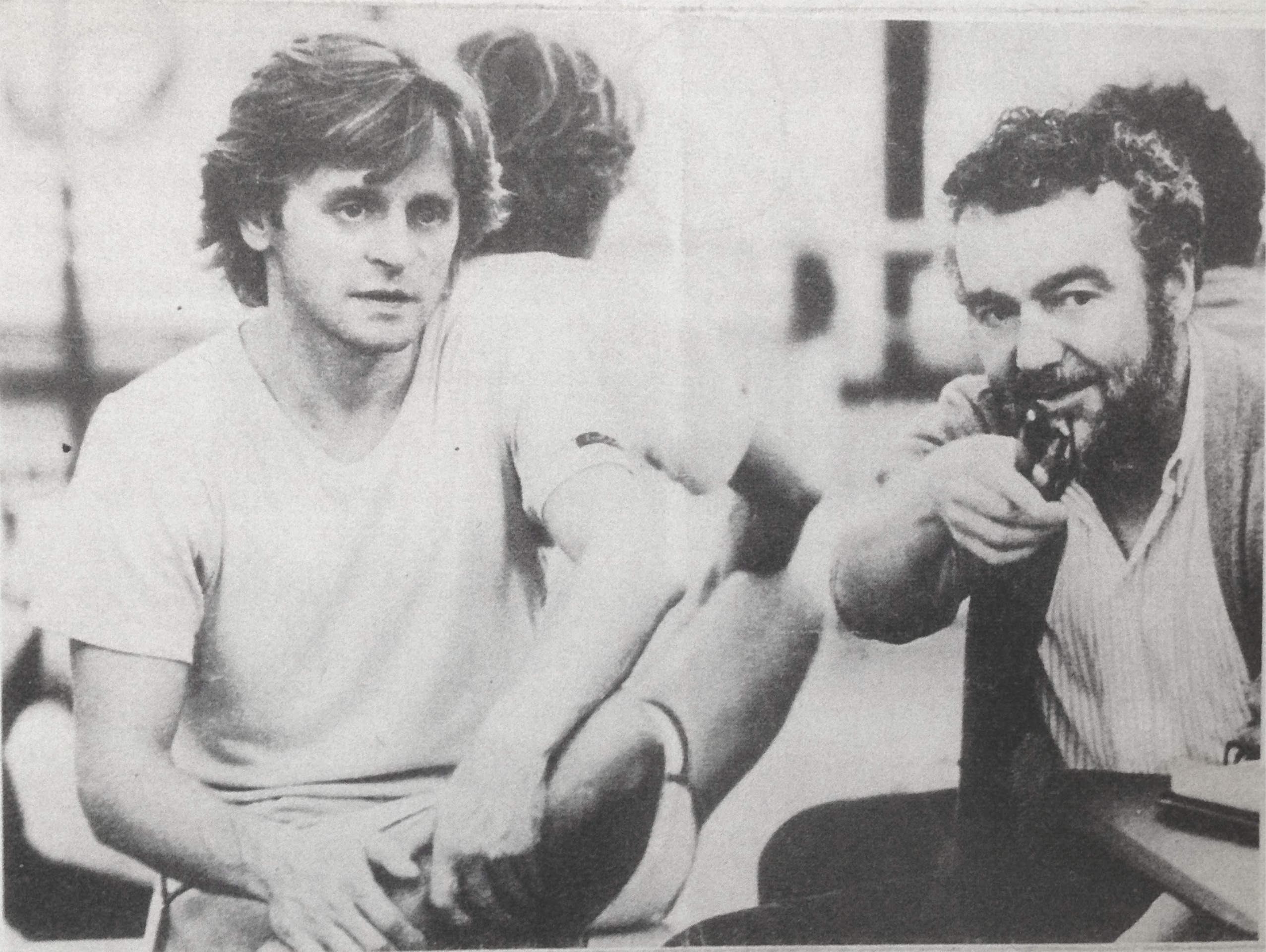
Mikhail Baryshnikov working with PierLuigi Samaritani, for director's production of Swan Lake at the American Ballet Theatre.

PierLuigi Samaritani (September 29, 1942, in Novara – January 5, 1994, in Rome) was a renowned opera director/production designer, who began his career at a young age, working alongside some of the greatest names in theatre, opera and ballet, such as Lila de Nobili, Giancarlo Menotti, Franco Zeffirelli, Luciano Pavarotti, Mikhail Baryshnikov, Rudolf Nureyev and many more. Samaritani had an enormous talent, which allowed him to take on all the roles the theatre, opera and ballet demanded, making sure to always be involved in all aspects of his productions even when delegating. From the creation of his "sketches" of the set, which were more like works of art in and of themselves to the smallest change in an extra’s costume, he was a true perfectionist preoccupied with every detail. His productions graced the stage of countless opera houses and theaters, amongst them La Scala di Milano, Teatro Regio of Parma, The Metropolitan Opera House, American Ballet Theatre and the Festival of Two Worlds at Spoleto (Festival dei Due Mondi), where he collaborated for many years, alongside his dear friend, Gian Carlo Menotti. The Teatro Lirico Sperimentale di Spoleto founded in 1947 in Spoleto, by Adriano Belli created a special award carrying the name of Pier Luigi Samaritani, awarded each year to the set designer with the best set design of the opera season.

== Education ==
Pierluigi Samaritani was born in Novara, Italy and later moved to Milan, Italy to receive his degree from the Academy of Fine Arts of Brera. He soon after went to Paris to continue his studies at L’Ecole Superieure d’Arts et Technique du Théâtre, where he studied under famed stage and costume designer, Lila de Nobili (September 3, 1916 – February 19, 2002). Lila never attended school but dedicated herself to painting and drawing. Her talent show through her work doing cover and high fashion illustrations for Vogue, Hermes and others. De Nobili was well known for her highly romanticized settings. De Nobili would become a huge influence on Samaritani and his work. She was known for her collaborations with Italian directors Luchino Visconti and Franco Zeffirelli, and also did productions in the UK for Laurence Olivier and Peter Hall at Stratford-Upon-Avon. Hall was founder of the Royal Shakespeare Company and later director of the National Theatre. Lila de Nobili never married and lived in Paris most her life, though, while working on her productions in the UK, she lived with Peter Hall and his wife, Leslie Caron, who was a close friend of Lila’s at their home in Knightsbridge.

== Personal life ==
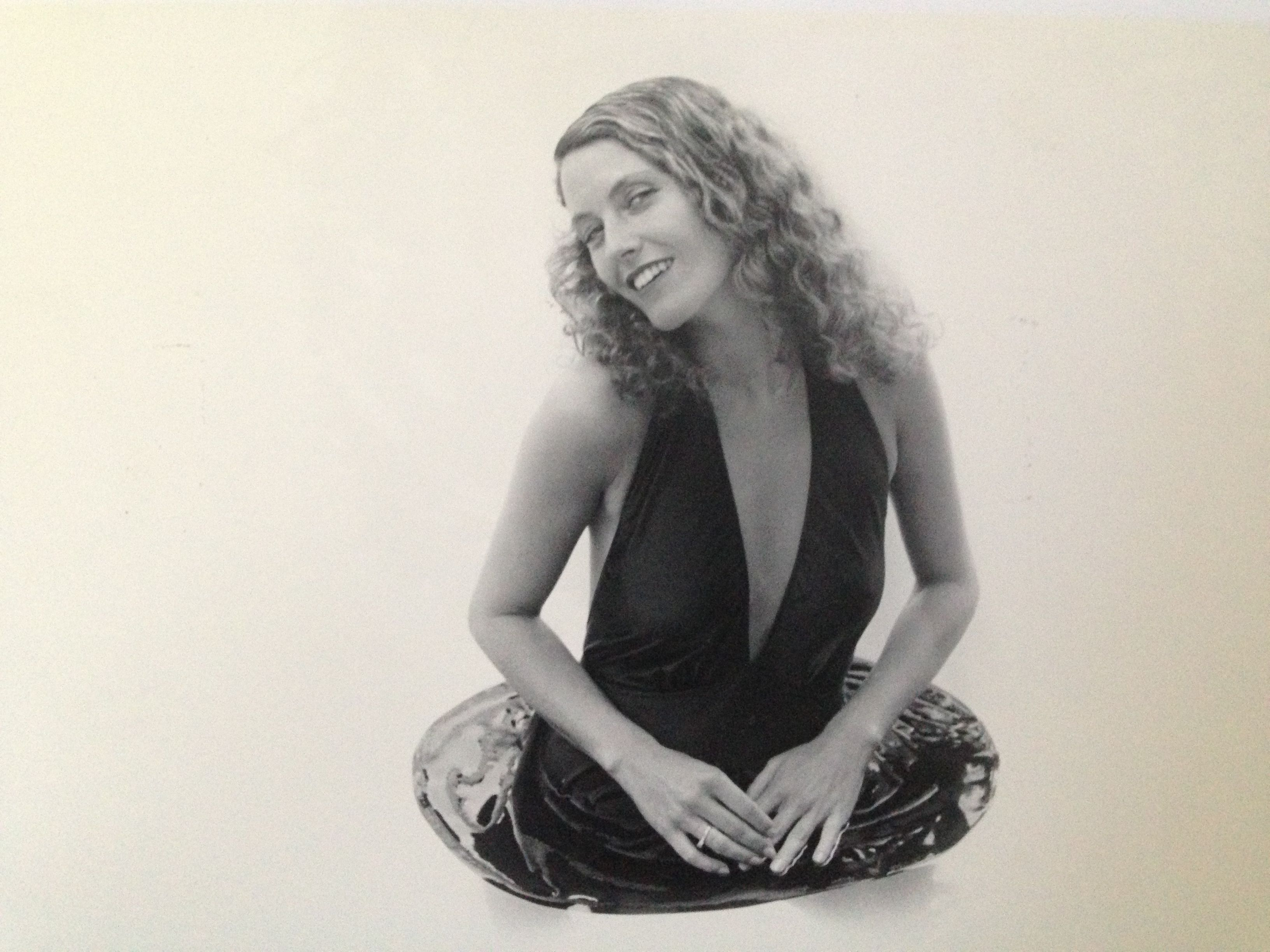
Photographer and former model, actress and TV personality, Maria del Pilar Munoz Fontaine; Samaritani's widow

Pierluigi Samaritani had no children and was married only once. His widow, Chilean former model, Maria del Pilar Muñoz Fontaine, has two children (Samaritani’s stepsons): international designer and marchand d’art, Micky Hurley, and his brother, Max Hurley, an entrepreneur and awarded ad man. The whole family lived together for a time in Samaritani’s villa in Tuscany in the 1990s.

Samaritani died on January 5, 1994, in Rome, after complications from terminal cancer.

== Career ==
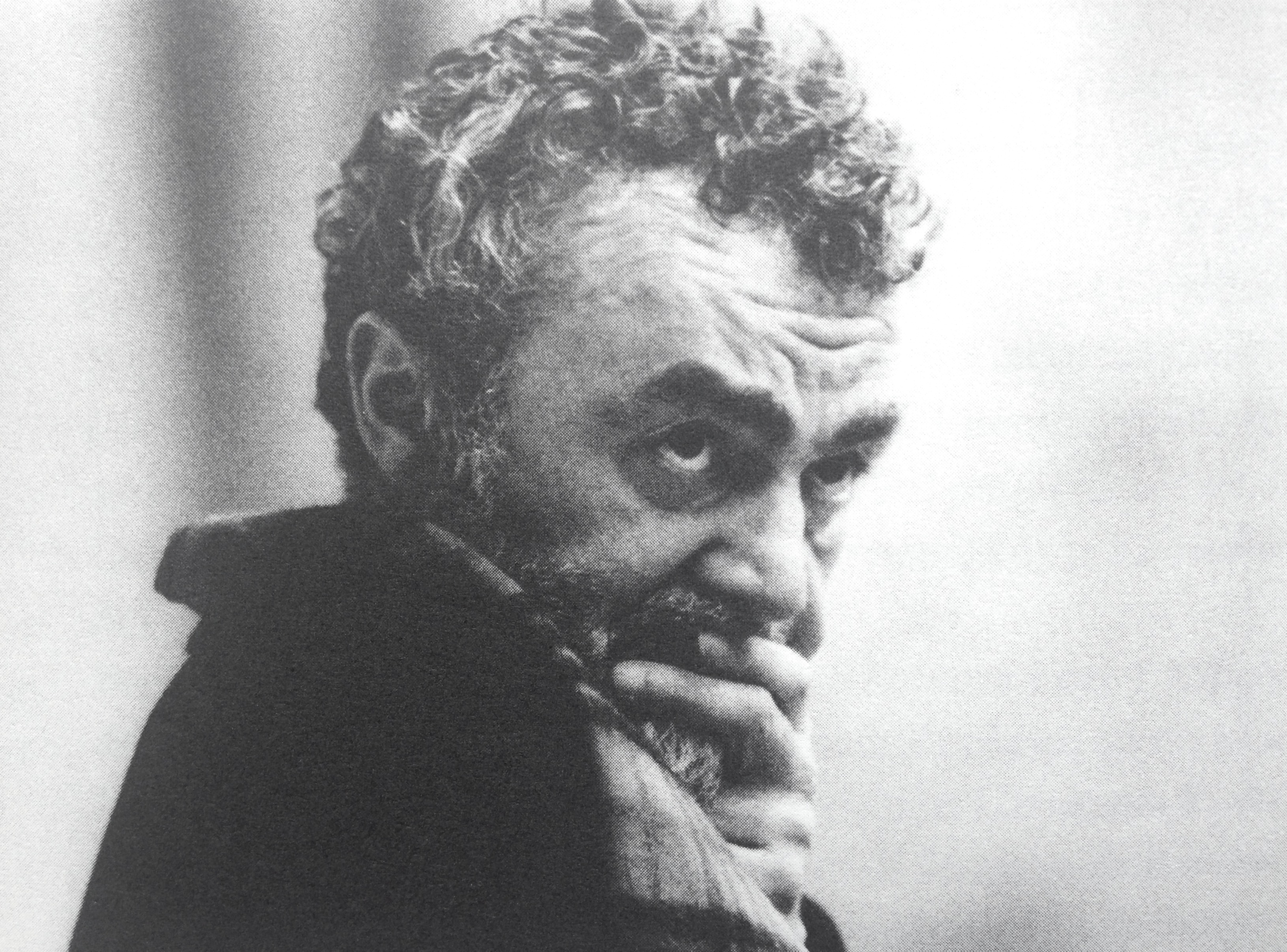
Samaritani on set

Samaritani worked all over the world, in the most prestigious opera houses and theatres. His favorite theatre was said to be the communal theatre of Florence, for which he produced several works. Several conductors, opera registas, set designers and other great artists and talents have used Samaritani's works for their opera productions around the world. Some examples are: Claus Helmet Drese.

The New York Times published an article on June 2, 2015, detailing the shortcomings and highlights of a recent La Bayadère production at the Metropolitan Opera House, based on the production choreographed by the late, famed dancer Natalia Makarova. The article exalts PierLuigi Samaritani's set design as a high-point in the production: "The Makarova production has Pier Luigi Samaritani’s fabulous painted scenery, always a triumph of rich Indian color and successful illusion."

== List of productions 1967 - 1986 ==
- Manfred (Schumann) Teatro dell’Opera di Roma 1967
- I Capricci di Callot (Malpiero) Teatro alla Scala di Milano 1968
- Semiramide (Rossini) Maggio Musicale Fiorentino 1968
- Tristano e Isotta (Wagner) Festival dei Due Mondi di Spoleto 1968
- Maria di Rohan (Donizetti) Teatro alla Scala 1969
- La Clemenza di Tito (Mozart) Teatro dell’Opera di Roma 1969
- El Retablo de maese Pedro (De Falla) Festival dei Due Mondi di Spoleto 1969
- La Vestale (Spontini) Teatro Massimo di Palermo 1970
- Carmen (Bizet) Teatro alla Scala di Milano 1972
- Mosè (Rossini) Maggio Musicale Fiorentino 1973
- Sebastian (Menotti) Teatro Massimo di Palermo 1973
- Boheme (Puccini) TEatro dell’Opera di Roma 1974
- La Falena (Smareglia) Teatro Verdi di Trieste 1975
- Re Cervo (Henze) Maggio Musicale Fiorentino 1976
- La Forza del Destino (Verdi) San Drancisco Opera House 1976
- Luisa Miller (Verdi) Teatro all Scala di Milano 1976
- La Signora delle Camelie (Dumas) Teatro Eliseo di Roma – Compagnia Falk 1976
- La Traviata (Verdi) Teatro dell’Opera di Roma 1977
- Medea in Corinto (Mayr) Teatro San Carlo di Napoli 1977
- Werther (Massenet) Teatro Comunale di Firenze 1978
- Thaïs (Massenet) Teatro dell’Opera di Roma 1978
- Carmen (Bizet) Deutsche Oper Berlin 1979
- Madama Butterfly (Puccini) Teatro Comunale di Firenze 1979
- Faust (Gounod) Chicago Lyric Opera 1979
- La Sonnambula (Bellini) Festival dei Due Mondi di Spoleto 1979
- Lucia di Lammermoor (Donizetti) Arena di Verona 1979
- Eugenio Onieghin (Cajkovskij) Maggio Musicale Fiorentino 1980
- La Bayadere (Minkus) Metropolitan Opera House New York 1980
- Aida (Verdi) Chicago Lyric Opera 1980
- Francesca da Rimini (Zandonai) Teatro Filarmonico di Veronca 1980
- La Sonnambula (Rieti) American Ballet Theatre 1981
- Carmen (Bizet) TEatro Comunale di Firenze 1982
- Le Baiser de la Fee (Stravinsky) Teatro Comunale di Firenze 1982
- Manon (Massenet) Teatro dell’Opera di Roma 1982
- Parsifal (Wagner) Teatro dell’Opera di Roma 1983
- Ernani (Verdi) Metropolitan Opera House New York 1983
- Madama Butterfly (Puccini) Festival Pucciniano di Torre del Lago 1984
- Manon Lescaut (Puccini) Teatro Comunale di Firenze 1985
- Macbeth (Verdi) Teatro Municipal de Santiago 1985
- La Rondine (Puccini) Teatro Regio di Parma 1986
