= Schwergewicht =

Opera by Ernst Krenek

- Burleske Operette by Ernst Krenek
- Motif: Ochsenschwanz locks up his wife
- Translation: Heavyweight
- Other title: Schwergewicht, oder Die Ehre der Nation
- Librettist: Krenek
- Language: German
- Premiere: 6 May 1928; Hessisches Staatstheater Wiesbaden

Schwergewicht, oder Die Ehre der Nation (Heavyweight or The Glory of The Nation) is a burleske Operette with text and music by Ernst Krenek, his Op. 55 and (with Der Diktator and Das geheime Königreich) the third of his 1928 one-acters. This satirical skit (as the composer was to call it in Horizons Circled) was provoked by the German ambassador's comment that sports heroes – and not artists – were the true ambassadors of nations, and the title character Ochsenschwanz ("oxtail") is a reference to the boxer Max Schmeling.

Like Jonny spielt auf, it makes frequent allusions to jazz, both in its use of percussion and banjo and in its "Tempo di Blues". There is even a nod to Mendelssohn's Wedding March (see example).

== Performance history ==
The score was begun 15 March 1927 in Kassel and completed on June 14; the premiere, conducted by Joseph Rosenstock, took place on 6 May 1928 at the Festspiele Wiesbaden in the Hessisches Staatstheater Wiesbaden and was followed by a production in Leipzig.

== Roles ==
Roles, voice types
Role	Voice type
Ochsenschwanz, boxing champion	bass
Evelyne, his wife	soprano
Gaston, her dancing instructor	tenor
Professor Himmelhuber	baritone
Anna Maria, his daughter	mezzo-soprano
Journalist	tenor
Government Minister	tenor
Ottokar, servant	silent
Maid	walk-on

== Synopsis ==
After a short overture the curtain rises on a training room. Evelyne complains about the strenuous exercises for a coming Charleston marathon, but her instructor Gaston reminds her that this is pretext for their shared moments together. Her husband, the dieting boxer Ochsenschwanz, enters and watches them eat breakfast with growing displeasure, erupting when he catches them kissing: a blow meant for Gaston instead demolishes his new training machine. He locks Evelyne in her room and ruefully surveys the wreckage before going out, allowing the lovers to sing a duet through the window.

Anna Maria, a homely looking student, enters timidly: "I'm conscious of what I'm doing, but my subconscious is too strong" and is forced to hide under the table when Ochsenschwanz brings a journalist in for an interview over his training breakfast. "What are your impressions of America?" (trying the toast) "Too dry." "What do you think of Beethoven?" "Don't bother me with those (sic!) amateurs. Of course I know the masters like Dempsey..." "Do you know Goethe's Faust?" "Mine is better!" (Faust meaning in German "fist".) "What about modern art?" "Götz von Berlichingen." Anna Maria is discovered and asks for an autograph just as a maid brings a visiting card from Professor Himmelhuber. The daughter is distraught, Ochsenschwanz meets her father in the living room. A thinly disguised Gaston has been observing; he talks Anna Maria into stripping to her long underwear and posing as the dummy on the new training machine he is delivering.

The ruse at first takes in the father, until Gaston's whispered threats of a scandal with an underage girl ("think of America!") send an enraged Ochsenschwanz to the machine where he gives Anna Maria a knockout blow. Surrounded by accusations of adultery, seduction and sadism, he cries "Just be thankful I can work my rage off on the machine instead of yourselves!" Only as the rest depart does he notice he has been cuffed to the device. A minister enters to inform him that he's been chosen for the Olympics, but instead of responding to pleas to turn the machine off, he says by no means would he steal even a minute from Ochsenschwanz' training, after all, "You are the glory of the nation!"
