= Der Diktator =

Opera by Ernst Krenek

- Opera by Ernst Krenek
- Librettist: Krenek
- Language: German
- Based on: Benito Mussolini
- Premiere: 6 May 1928; Festspiele Wiesbaden

Der Diktator (The Dictator) is a tragic opera in one act with words and music by Ernst Krenek, his Op. 49 and the first of three one-acters (with Das geheime Königreich and Schwergewicht, oder Die Ehre der Nation) which premiered on 6 May 1928 at the Hessisches Staatstheater Wiesbaden as part of the Festspiele Wiesbaden. The score is inscribed with the date of completion, 28 August 1926.

The title character is loosely based on Benito Mussolini, although the story is not deliberately political; Krenek later described it as "an anecdote from the private life of the 'strong man'. "Only from the irrational does he retreat, not so much out of fear but because he can do nothing with it, he cannot dominate it."

The music is Puccinian in idiom, particularly in its use of the voice, and makes extensive use of leitmotives such as the alternating minor third triplet first heard in the bass as the war telegram is mentioned, which becomes the sole accompaniment to the officer's narrative.

== Roles ==
Roles, voice types, premiere cast
Role	Voice type	Premiere cast, 6 May 1928 Conductor: Joseph Rosenstock
The Dictator	baritone	
Charlotte, his wife	soprano	Viorica Ursuleac
The Officer	tenor	
Maria, his wife	soprano	
Courier, groom, medical orderly, detective (silent)

== Synopsis ==
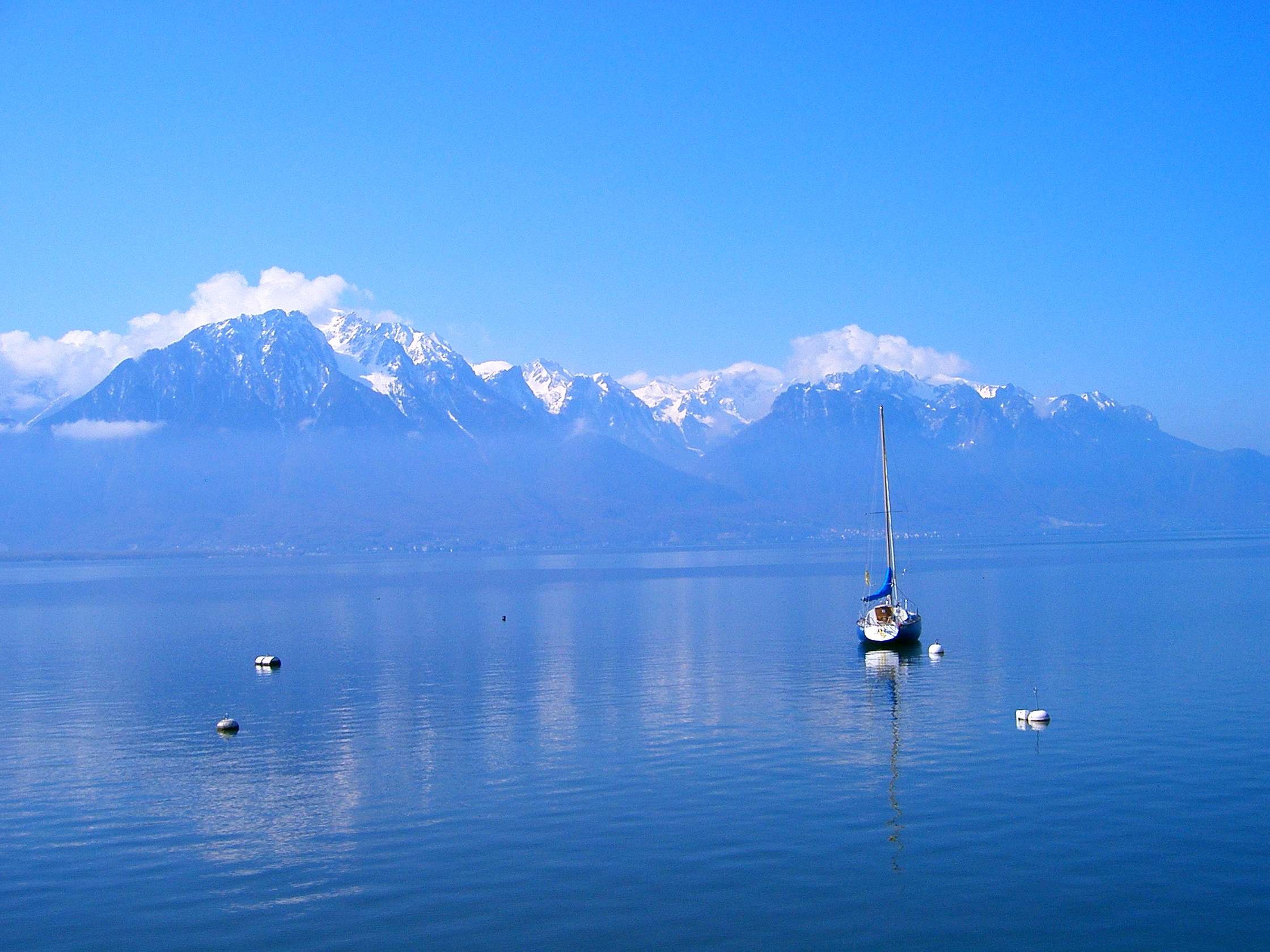
The view from Montreux described in the stage directions

The curtain rises on a terrace between the Grand Palace hotel and a sanatorium, overlooking Lake Geneva. Maria is admiring the summer evening from the hospital, when the Dictator walks a courier out of the hotel, instructing him to deliver a declaration of war. Maria shrinks from his gaze, but he is fascinated. Charlotte comes out, upset at the news: "You already have too many enemies"; he tells her that her fears for him are a form of jealousy and toasts a coming victory while the women join in a trio, Maria complaining about his unbearable eyes and Charlotte singing that when his luck has run out he will be hers again.

All go inside, and the officer is wheeled out, crying for air and light. He tells Maria, who follows, the story of his blinding by poison gas. She promises to avenge him by killing his commander and they sing a duet: "..and these hands, forced to shed so much innocent blood, let me dip them in the blood of the guilty one." (see example below)

The scene changes to an interior. The Dictator orders a visitor to be admitted, dismissing Charlotte's fears – "I have a premonition about her too." Maria enters and, over interruptions, announces her intention to kill him as soon as he can say his prayers, drawing a revolver. "A pity, so soon after I have fallen in love with you", he tells her. Charlotte, who has hidden in sight of the audience, is torn between intervening and waiting to see whether his declaration is only a ruse. The Dictator offers to lower his mask, having found a companion capable of understanding him and expounds his philosophy of victory of the strongest. Eventually Maria declares herself ready to join him and lays aside the revolver. When Charlotte picks it up to kill him, Maria jumps in front and takes the bullet. The Dictator sends Charlotte out and tells the hotel detective to call the police. The officer enters, having heard the shot, and calls to Maria to lead him to the body. The Dictator is finally overcome with horror and silently flees.

The officer extracts Maria's promise to lead him to the body.
