= Leben des Orest =

Opera by Ernst Krenek

- Grand opera by Ernst Krenek
- Librettist: Krenek
- Language: German
- Based on: Orestes
- Premiere: 19 January 1930; Neues Theater, Leipzig

Leben des Orest (The Life of Orestes) is a grand opera in five acts (eight scenes) with words and music both by Ernst Krenek. It is his Op. 60 and the first of his own libretti with an antique setting. The score is inscribed with the dates of composition, 8 August 1928 – 13 May 1929, and includes indications of recommended cuts made for the first production. It premiered at the Neues Theater in Leipzig on 19 January 1930, and opened at the Kroll Opera House in Berlin in early March of the same year (Leichtentritt 1930, 366).

== Performance history ==
Leben des Orest had 13 productions by 1933, when the Nazis seized power and banned Krenek from German stages. The first postwar revival was in 1947 in Linz and performances in Frankfurt (1951), Graz (1952), Düsseldorf (1954) and Wiesbaden (1961) followed. The 1961 Darmstadt performances were conducted by Krenek himself, but drew loud demonstrations against its supposed musical conservatism. Pierre Boulez wrote an open letter denouncing the management's actions against the disruptions as "organized terror" and the faculty of the Sommerferienkurse sided with him in calling the work a mere relic of the 1920s.

A successful revival was the Portland Opera's 1975 Life of Orestes in the composer's English translation.

== Roles ==
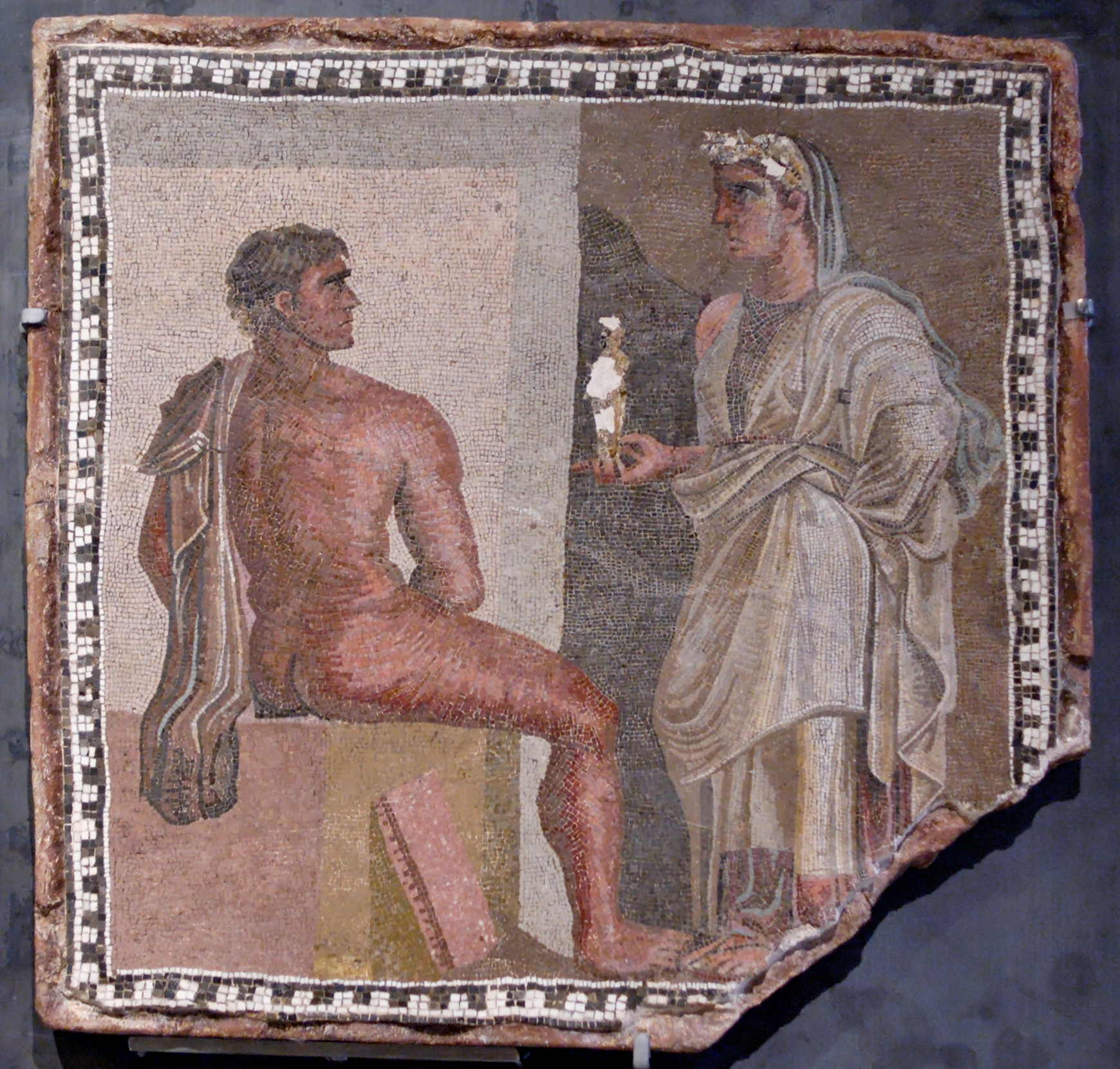
Orestes and Iphigenia, mosaic in Rome's Capitoline Museum

- Agamemnon, a king in Greece (tenor)
- Klytæmnestra, his wife (mezzo-soprano or contralto)
- Elektra, their daughter
- Iphigenie, their daughter
- Orest, their son (baritone)
- Ægisth, a relative (tenor)
- Anastasia, the royal nurse (contralto)
- Ægisth's servant
- Three Elders
- A lame accordionist
- Aristobulos, Chief justice in Athens
- A cryer
- Two street-girls
- Four street singers
- Shepherd
- Small girl
- Thoas, a northern king (bass)
- Thamar, his daughter (soprano)
- Crowds, warriors, guards, Athenians, judges, artists, dancers chorus

== Synopsis ==
The opera opens with the chorus (hidden by a scrim) singing of the southern land of their longing. The curtain rises on a busy square in front of Agamemnon's palace. Anastasia tells the crowd of the impending Trojan War. Agamemnon enters and exhorts them in chopped phrases, but they clamour loudly for peace. "Go away and let me decide" he orders, and the street is cleared by armed guards. There's no turning back, even if his own children were to be sacrificed. This strikes Ægisth, who has been following, as a very good idea. After all, you're a little afraid of your son anyway! He tells him that it will be easier to convince the queen if Ægisth's name is kept out of it and the plan seems the king's own, and when Agamemnon leaves he expresses his glee at being closer to the throne. Klytæmnestra's cries are heard from the palace; Agamemnon tells her that, as priest of all Greece, he is carrying out the will of the gods. Klytæmnestra orders Anastasia to flee with Orest to Phokisland, and shudders as the instruments of sacrifice are brought in to the sound of trumpets. When the people are reassembled, Agamemnon announces his plan. As soon as Orest's flight is known, they shout "treachery" and begin to riot, but are again overawed when the king decides to offer Iphigenie. As he raises the axe the child disappears in thunder and darkness. As the breeze picks up, the people sing a farewell to peacetime and depart, Klytæmnestra remarking that the limping accordionist who remains is a fitting emblem of the ravaged country.

The chorus altos again relate how Agamemnon was rewarded, for his great faith in the gods, with a miracle, and the curtain rises on Thoas' astronomical observatory. He relates how, since he was widowed, he has sought consolation in the secrets of nature, and he senses that the Moon is about to send an embodiment of the longed-for southern land. Thamar stirs in her sleep and tries to call a warning, but he places her back under hypnosis. Thoas bids the approaching vision to speak, and Iphigenie calls out for her father. Both look startled and somewhat disappointed. After an interlude the chorus relates how Anastasia and Orest could go no farther when they reached Athens on the faire day, on which the curtain now rises. [to be continued]
