= Hessisches Staatstheater Wiesbaden =

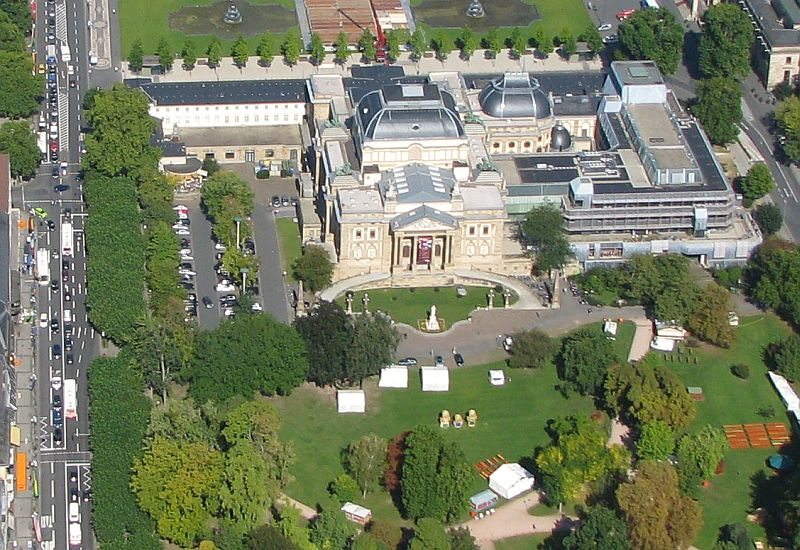
- Aerial view of the theatre in Wiesbaden, the capital of Hesse
- Interactive map of the Hessisches Staatstheater Wiesbaden area

General information
- Location: Wiesbaden, Hesse, Germany
- Coordinates: 50°05′01″N 8°14′45″E
- Construction started: 1892
- Completed: 1894

Design and construction
- Architects: Ferdinand Fellner; Hermann Helmer

Website
- www.staatstheater-wiesbaden.de

The Hessisches Staatstheater Wiesbaden (Hessian State Theatre Wiesbaden), also known as the Staatstheater Wiesbaden or Theater Wiesbaden, is a German theatre located in Wiesbaden, in the German state of Hesse. The company produces operas, plays, ballets, musicals and concerts on four stages. It has a resident orchestra, the Hessisches Staatsorchester. The theatre was inaugurated in 1894.

The theatre is the host for the annual festival Internationale Maifestspiele Wiesbaden, established in 1896 after the Bayreuth Festival.

== History ==
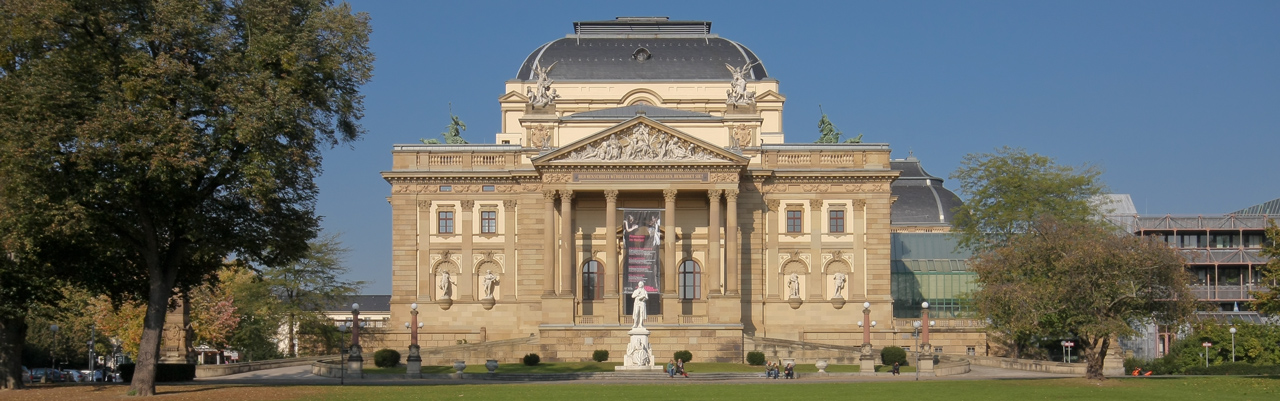
The back of Großes Haus, from the park

The building of the theatre was initiated and substantially supported by the German emperor William II who regularly visited the spa in Wiesbaden. A team of architects from Vienna, Ferdinand Fellner and Hermann Helmer, won the competition. They constructed the building from 1892 to 1894 in Baroque Revival style, following models in Prague and Zurich. The inauguration was on 16 October 1894 in the presence of the emperor. The Foyer was built in 1902 by architect Felix Genzmer. It serves three stages.

After World War I, the theatre was renamed "Preußisches Staatstheater" (Prussian State Theatre). Since 1932, the city of Wiesbaden was responsible for the theatre; therefore it was renamed "Nassauisches Landestheater" (Theater of the Province Nassau). Carl von Schirach was director until 1943.

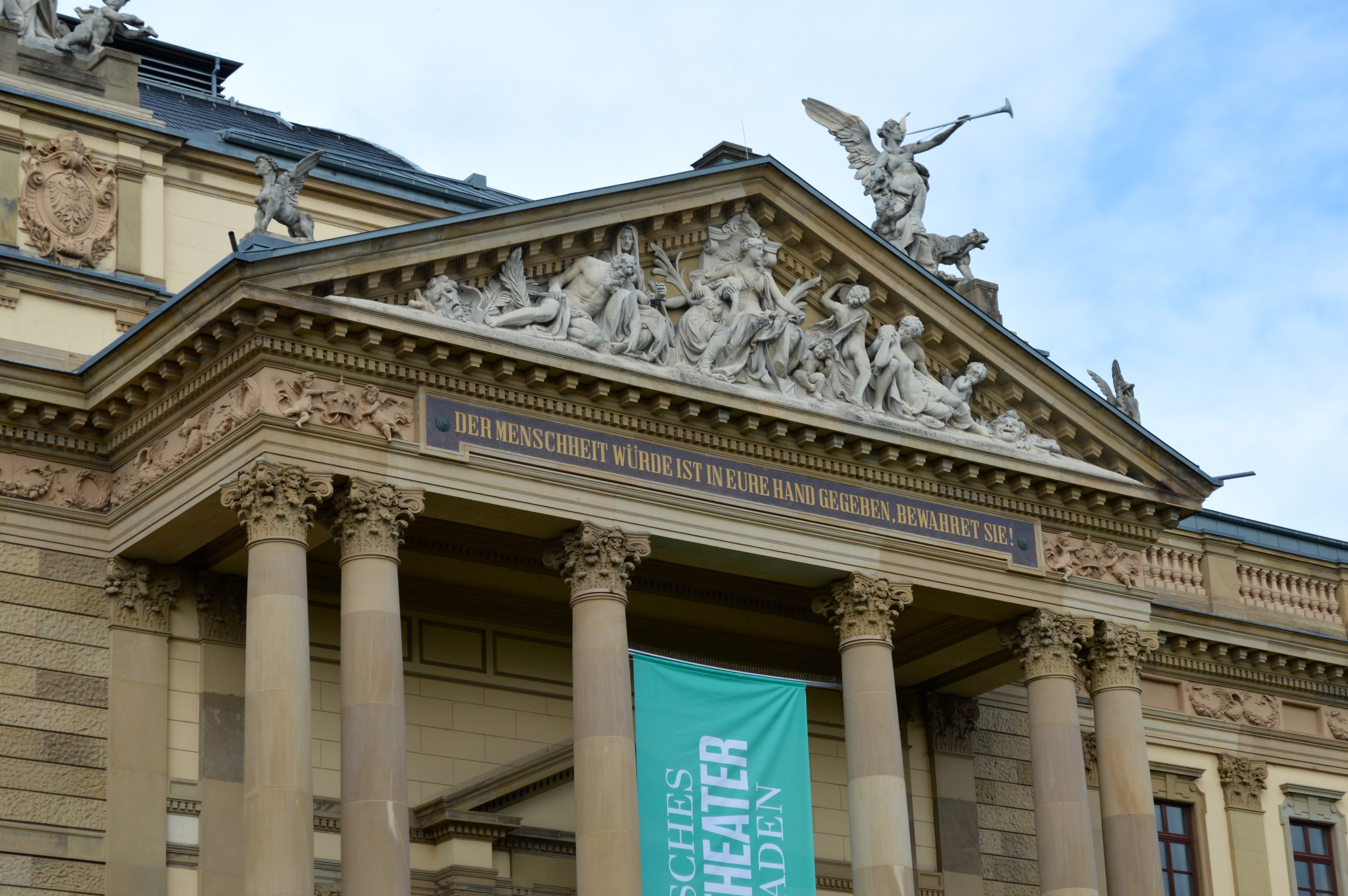
Detail of the south facade

The building was seriously damaged in World War II by a bomb on 3 February 1945. The front was partially restored and the ceiling of the hall was decorated with a contemporary painting.

In 1946, the State of Hesse took over the operation of the theatre. In 1947, it was re-opened as the "Großhessisches Staatstheater" (State Theater of Great Hesse), later "Hessisches Staatstheater Wiesbaden".

From 1975 to 1978, the auditorium was restored according to the historic model. The technical equipment was modernized. A new tract was built, designed by Hardt-Waltherr Hämer, for rehearsal rooms, workshops and administration.

== Performance facilities ==
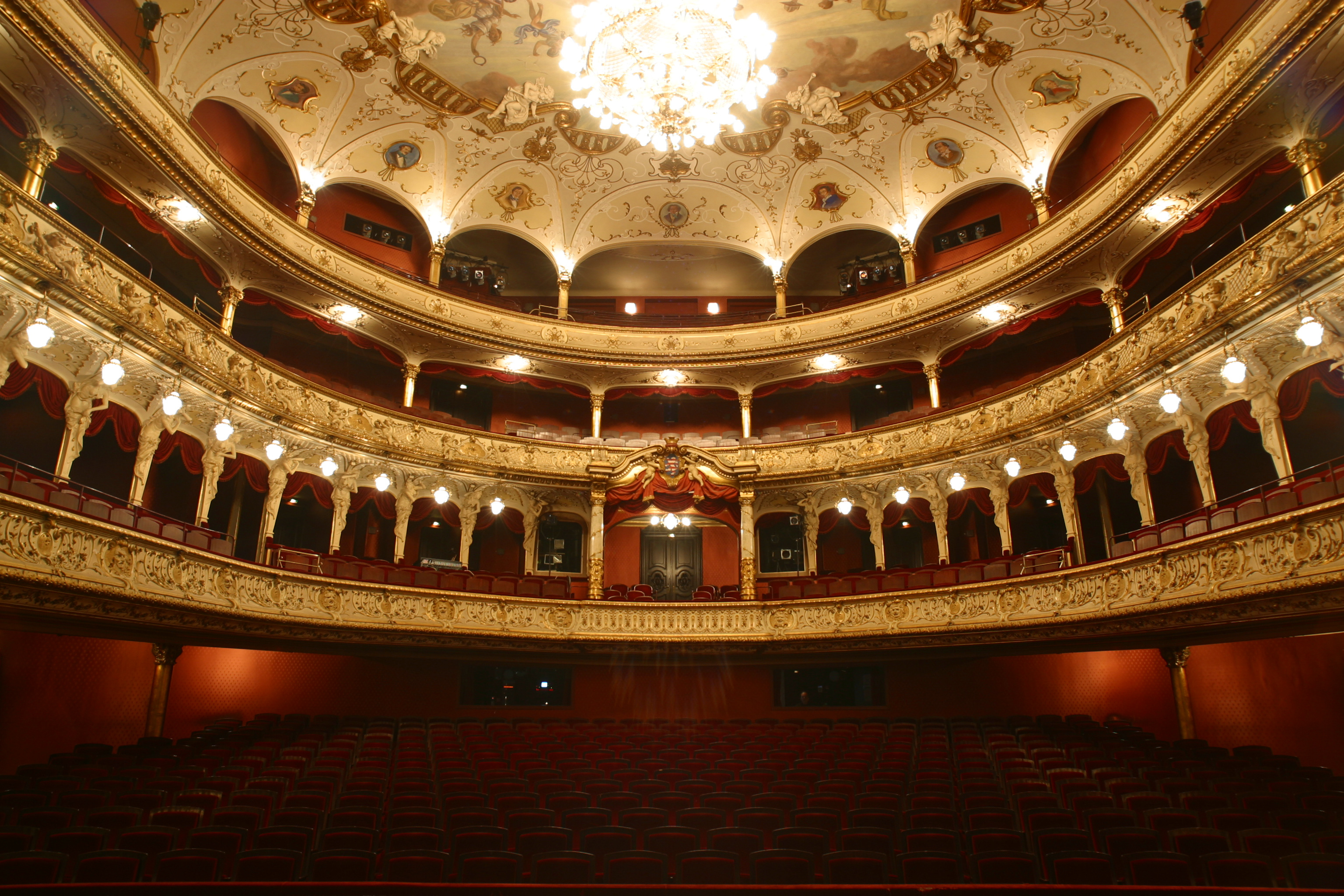
Großes Haus

The theatre has four stages, three of them in the historic house:

- Großes Haus (Great House) with 1,041 seats.
- Kleines Haus (Small House) with 328 seats.
- Studio with 89 seats.
- Wartburg, from 2003, is an additional small separate stage.

The staff consist of about 600 people. Annually more than 25 new operas, plays and ballets have been produced.

The theatre is especially dedicated to a young audience, collaborating with schools for "Schultheatertage". A professional ensemble, "Junges Staatstheater" (Young State Theater) is dedicated to children's and youth theater.

In addition to the annual Internationale Maifestspiele in May, since 2004 a biennial festival "Neue Stücke aus Europa" (New European Plays) is organized in collaboration with the Staatstheater Mainz, presenting in ten days new plays in the original language with simultaneous translation.

The current Intendant of the company is Uwe-Eric Laufenberg, since 2014. He is scheduled to stand down from the post at the end of the 2023–2024 season.

== Artistic directors ==
- Georg von Hülsen-Haeseler (1893–1903)
- Kurt von Munzenbechers (1903–1918)
- Carl Hagemann (1920–1927
- Paul Bekker (1927–1932 )
- Friedrich Schramm (1953–1962)
- Claus Helmut Drese (1962–1968)
- Alfred Erich Sistig (1968–1975)
- Peter Ebert (1975–1078)
- Christoph Groszer (1978–1986)
- Claus Leininger (1986–1994)
- Arnold Petersen (1994–1996)
- Achim Thorwald (1996–2002)
- Manfred Beilharz (2002–2014)
- Uwe Eric Laufenberg (2014–2024)

== Orchestras and conductors ==
=== Städtisches Cur- und Sinfonieorchester ===
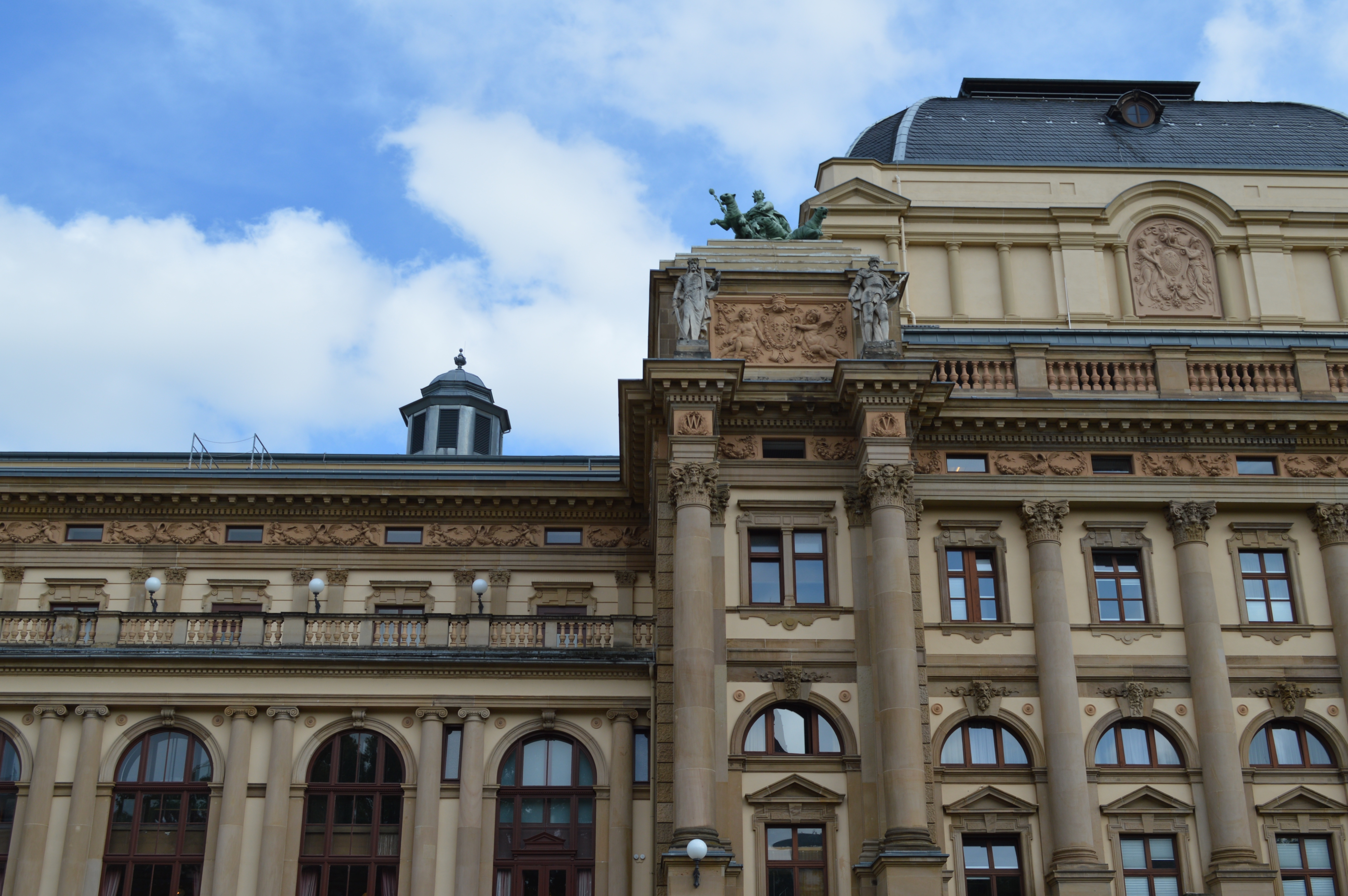
Part of the west facade

Wiesbaden's first major orchestra was in 1873 the "Städtisches Cur- und Sinfonieorchester" (Communal Spa and Symphony Orchestra). Its conductor from 1874 to 1905, Louis Lüstner, established besides entertaining music for the spa audience twelve symphony concerts a year. During this period Johannes Brahms, Clara Schumann, Joseph Joachim, Camille Saint-Saëns and Pablo de Sarasate appeared in concert, among others. Felix Mottl was a regular guest conductor from 1894. The number of players was raised from 56 to 65 in 1905 to 1911. From 1912 Carl Schuricht was the conductor, appointed Generalmusikdirektor (GMD) 1921. Regular guest conductors during his era, which lasted until 1944, included Fritz Busch, Felix Weingartner, Bruno Walter and Richard Strauss.

=== Staatskapelle ===
The second orchestra "Staatskapelle", was founded in 1894, with the new opera house, to play exclusively opera and ballet. Conductors included:

- 1906– Artur Rother
- 1924–1927 Otto Klemperer
- 1932– Heinrich Hollreiser
- 1933–1936 Karl Elmendorff

Guest conductors included Thomas Beecham, Leo Blech and Fritz Busch. Richard Strauss conducted opera almost annually.

=== Hessisches Staatsorchester ===
After the war, a fusion of the two orchestras under the new name Hessisches Staatsorchester was initiated and finalized by Wolfgang Sawallisch at the end of the 1950s.

- Franz-Paul Decker (1950–1956)
- Wolfgang Sawallisch (1958–1960)
- Siegfried Köhler (1973–1988)
- Ulf Schirmer (1988–1991)
- Oleg Caetani (1992–1995)
- Jonathan Nott (1995–1996)
- Joachim Arnold (1996–1997)
- Toshiyuki Kamioka (1996–2004)
- Marc Piollet (2004–2012)
- Zsolt Hamar (2012–2017)
- Patrick Lange (2017–2021)
- Leo McFall (2024–present)
