= Werner Reinhart =

Swiss businessman (1884–1951)

Werner Reinhart (19 March 1884 – 29 August 1951) was a Swiss merchant, philanthropist, amateur clarinetist, and patron of composers and writers, particularly Igor Stravinsky and Rainer Maria Rilke. Reinhart knew and corresponded with many artists and musicians of the early-mid 20th century in Europe and the world, and his Villa Rychenberg in Winterthur became an international meeting point for musicians and writers.

He was sometimes referred to as "the Winterthur Maecenas". Alice Bailly named Werner Reinhart "L'homme aux mains d'or" – the man with the golden hands, and her 1920 portrait of him is called "The Man with the Golden Heart". Oskar Kokoschka also painted his portrait in 1947.

Werner Reinhart inherited his wealth from the Volkart family business, based in Winterthur, which he ran together with his elder brother Georg. Reinhart and Hermann Scherchen played a leading role in shaping the musical life of Winterthur between 1922 and 1950, the emphasis being on contemporary music, and they were instrumental in numerous premieres being performed there. Scherchen was one of many people whom Reinhart patronised, not least in Scherchen's case because he had to pay alimony to no less than five ex-wives.

== People Reinhart supported and assisted (abridged) ==
=== Othmar Schoeck ===
Othmar Schoeck was left destitute when World War I broke out. His appointment as conductor of the St. Gallen Symphony Orchestra (with special permission to remain resident in Zürich), combined with the annuity Werner Reinhart gave him from 1916 onwards, allowed Schoeck to give up his jobs as chorus director and to compose more or less undisturbed. Schoeck was not given to overt signs of gratitude, but he dedicated to Werner Reinhart the following works:

- Gaselen, 10 poems by Gottfried Keller, Op. 38 (1923), for baritone, flute, oboe, bass clarinet, trumpet, percussion and piano
- the Sonata for Bass Clarinet and Piano, Op. 41 (1927–28)
- the Suite in A flat for Strings, Op. 59 (1945).

=== Igor Stravinsky ===
Igor Stravinsky approached Reinhart for financial assistance when he was writing Histoire du soldat (The Soldier's Tale). The first performance was conducted by Ernest Ansermet on 28 September 1918, at the Théâtre Municipal de Lausanne. Werner Reinhart sponsored this performance, and to a large degree underwrote it. In gratitude, Stravinsky dedicated the work to Reinhart, and even gave him the original manuscript.

Reinhart continued his support of Stravinsky's work in 1919 by funding a series of concerts of his recent chamber music. These included a suite of five numbers from The Soldier's Tale, arranged for clarinet, violin, and piano, which was a nod to Reinhart, who was an excellent amateur clarinettist. The suite was first performed on 8 November 1919, in Lausanne, long before the better-known suite for the seven original instruments became widely known. Stravinsky dedicated his Three Pieces for Clarinet to Reinhart, in gratitude for his ongoing support.

Reinhart founded a music library of Stravinskiana at his home in Winterthur.

=== Rainer Maria Rilke ===
In 1919, Rainer Maria Rilke travelled to Switzerland from Munich. The outward motive was an invitation to lecture in Zürich, but the real reason was the wish to escape the post-war chaos and take up once again his work on the Duino Elegies. The search for a suitable and affordable residence proved to be very difficult and Rilke lived in various places. Only in the summer of 1921 was he able to find a permanent abode in the Chateau de Muzot in the commune of Veyras, close to Sierre in Valais. It was at Muzot, in February 1922, that Rilke, in a storm of inspiration, wrote most of the fifty-five Sonnets to Orpheus and several smaller collections of poems. In May 1922, after deciding he could afford the cost of considerable necessary renovation, Werner Reinhart bought Muzot so that Rilke could live there rent-free, and became Rilke's patron. Here Rilke completed his greatest work, the Duino Elegies.

During this time, Reinhart introduced Rilke to his protégée, the Australian violinist Alma Moodie. Rilke was so impressed with her playing that he wrote in a letter: What a sound, what richness, what determination. That and the "Sonnets to Orpheus", those were two strings of the same voice. And she plays mostly Bach! Muzot has received its musical christening....

=== Paul Hindemith ===
Paul Hindemith's Clarinet Quintet, first performed at the ISCM Festival in Salzburg on 7 August 1923, was dedicated to Werner Reinhart, as was his Canon in Three Voices Sine musica nulla disciplina (1944).

Reinhart told Gertrud Hindemith "there was something Mozartian" about her husband's writing Trauermusik in less than a day in London after the death of King George V, and premiering it the same evening. "I know no one else today who could do that", he said.

=== Ernst Krenek ===
Ernst Krenek and his then-wife Anna Mahler (daughter of Gustav Mahler) lived in Zurich 1924–25, at Reinhart's invitation. Their marriage collapsed, however, and Krenek had a brief affair with Alma Moodie. While this relationship did not last, Krenek was so grateful for Moodie's introduction to Reinhart's assistance that he dedicated his Violin Concerto No. 1, Op. 29, to her. His Kleine Suite, Op. 28 (1924) was written for Reinhart himself, and a piano Prelude (1944, W.o.O. 87) bears the dedication, "Dedicated to Werner Reinhart in the old spirit of cordial friendship and with the most sincere wishes."

=== Arthur Honegger ===
Werner Reinhart was the primary financial supporter of the Théâtre du Jorat, where Arthur Honegger's oratorio Le Roi David premiered, and corresponded with its owner René Morax.

Honegger's Sonatine for Clarinet and Piano (1921–22) was written for Reinhart.

Honegger's Pastorale d’été was played in Berlin on 9 November 1922, conducted by Bernhard Seidmann. This was financially supported by Werner Reinhart, who also urged Honegger to program Horace victorieux, a work he believed to be far more important.

=== Anton Webern ===
It was thanks to Werner Reinhart that Anton Webern, who was living in political isolation in Austria, was able to attend the premiere of his Variations for Orchestra, Op. 30 in Winterthur in 1943. Reinhart invested all the financial and diplomatic means at his disposal to enable Webern to travel to Switzerland. In return for this support, Webern dedicated the work to him.

== Other dedications ==
- In 1944, Frank Martin wrote a "Canon for Werner Reinhart" for eight voices (SSAATTBB), to a text by Pierre de Ronsard.
- Adolf Busch's Sonata for solo bass clarinet was written for Reinhart.
- Hermann Burte dedicated Gedichte Voltaires to Reinhart.
- Richard Strauss dedicated his Sonatina no. 2 "Fröhliche Werkstatt" für 16 Blasinstrumente (a.k.a. Symphony for Wind Instruments, "Happy Workshop") to Reinhart.

== Other associates ==
- Reinhart was also on good terms with Arnold Schoenberg. Schoenberg wrote to Reinhart in 1923: "For the present, it matters more to me if people understand my older works ... I do not attach so much importance to being a musical bogey-man as to being a natural continuer of properly understood good old tradition!"
- In January 1933, Hans Pfitzner was so bereft of funds that he offered to sell three museum artefacts to Reinhart for the sum of 1,500 ℛ︁ℳ︁. On this occasion, Reinhart did not respond.
- After World War II, Wilhelm Furtwängler and his wife Elisabeth escaped to Switzerland with the assistance of Ernest Ansermet and were supported financially by Werner Reinhart.
- In 1920 Albert Moeschinger received a stipend from Reinhart for three years of study abroad.
- It was at Werner Reinhart's personal invitation that Petr Rybar became concertmaster for the Winterthur Orchestra, where he remained for 28 years.
- He also knew or corresponded with: Volkmar Andreae, Ernest Ansermet, René Auberjonois, Conrad Beck, Alban Berg, Alfredo Casella, Alexandre Cingria, Gustave Doret, Karl Ferdinand Edmund von Freyhold, Alois Hába, Clara Haskil, Hermann Hesse, Karl Hofer, Heinrich Kaminski, Rudolf Kassner, Carl Montag, Paul Müller-Zürich, Charles Ferdinand Ramuz, Ker-Xavier Roussel, Albert Schweitzer, Richard Strauss, Regina Ullmann and Felix Weingartner.
- The Winterthur Libraries hold musical and literary manuscripts by Beck, Berg, Debussy, de Falla, Franck, Haydn, Hindemith, Honegger, Kaminski, Krenek, Liszt, Frank Martin, Milhaud, Myaskovsky, Moeschinger, Mozart, Müller-Zürich, Ramuz (Histoire du soldat), Reger, Schoeck, Schubert, Richard Strauss, Stravinsky, Weber, Webern and Hugo Wolf.

== Bibliography ==
- Georges Duplain. L'Homme aux Mains d'Or: Werner Reinhart, Rilke, et les Créateurs de Suisse Romande
- Zehn Komponisten um Werner Reinhart: ein Ausschnitt aus dem Wirkungskreis des Musikkollegiums Winterthur, 1920–1950, Volume 1. Peter Sulzer. Stadtbibliothek, 1979 - Authors - 238 pages.
- Zehn Komponisten um Werner Reinhart : e. Ausschnitt aus d. Wirkungskreis d. Musikkollegiums Winterthur 1920 - 1950 - zweiter Band / Neujahrsblatt der Stadtbibliothek Winterthur 310 School & Library Binding – 1 Jan. 1980 by Peter Sulzer.
