= Morax =

Morax is a surname. Notable people with the surname include:

- Jean Morax (1869–1939), Swiss painter, theater decorator, and draftsman
- René Morax, Swiss poet and playwright (1873–1963), author of Le Roi David
- Victor Morax (1866–1935), French ophthalmologist
- Morax, the Geo Archon in 2020 video game Genshin Impact, who appears as Zhongli (Genshin Impact)
- King Morax, the main antagonist of the Millarworld comic book series Empress
