= Germaine Suter-Morax =

Swiss aid worker (1896–1974)

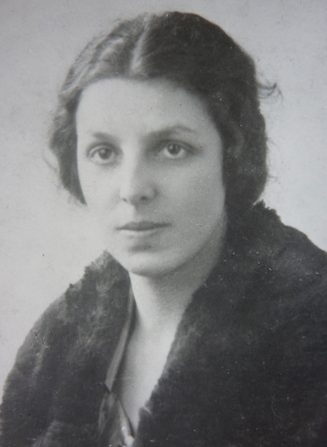
- Born: Germaine Morax; 26 July 1896; Morges, Vaud, Switzerland
- Died: 27 July 1974 (aged 78); Pully, Vaud, Switzerland
- Education: Degree in political science
- Alma mater: University of Lausanne
- Occupations: General secretary, co-founder

Germaine Suter-Morax (26 July 1896, in Morges – 27 July 1974, in Pully) was a key figure in the reception in French-speaking Switzerland of former French Resistance women deportees. As general secretary of the Swiss aid committee of the Association nationale des anciennes déportées et internées de la Résistance, led by her husband, she contributed until spring 1947 to the reception and recovery of 500 women in nine homes in French-speaking Switzerland, working with Geneviève de Gaulle to finance these efforts.

== Biography ==
=== Early life and family ===
Germaine Suter-Morax was born on July 26, 1896, in Morges, Vaud, Switzerland under the name Germaine Morax. Originating from Mex, in the Canton of Vaud, she was the daughter of Louis Morax, a merchant in Morges, and Julia née Meystre. She grew up with three brothers and one sister. Her father was the cousin of Jean Morax, René Morax, and Victor Morax.

=== Education ===
After attending the girls’ gymnasium in Lausanne, Suter-Morax studied at the University of Lausanne, where she obtained a degree in political science in 1918.

== Career ==
=== Humanitarian and social coordinator ===
With the outbreak of World War II, Suter-Morax took charge of the Vestiaire-Ouvroir SOS in Lausanne. She also welcomed groups of children for stays of a few weeks in Switzerland, in convoys organized in Lyon by her sister Florence Morax, as part of the activities of the Children’s Aid of the Swiss Red Cross.

=== Co-founder of the Lausanne Children’s Library ===
In January 1940, Suter-Morax contributed to the founding of the Lausanne Children’s Library, the first of its kind in Switzerland, alongside Nicolas Roubakine, Adolphe Ferrière, and Elisabeth Clerc, serving as treasurer until the mid-1960s.

=== General Secretary of the Swiss Aid Committee of the ADIR Association ===
During the summer of 1945, Suter-Morax assumed the role of general secretary of the Swiss aid committee of the Association nationale des anciennes déportées et internées de la Résistance (ADIR). This committee was based at the People’s House in Lausanne, under the direction of Gottlieb Suter, while the ADIR, established in Paris, benefited from the support of Florence Morax as a social worker.

Until spring 1947, the association managed the recovery of nearly 500 women across nine reception homes in French-speaking Switzerland. Germaine Suter-Morax collaborated with Geneviève de Gaulle, a former resistance fighter and deportee, to organize numerous conferences across the Confederation to finance this reception, also benefiting from the support of the Swiss Donation for War Victims

== Personal life ==
In 1923, she married Gottlieb Suter (sometimes called Gotto) in Paris, an administrator of the Théâtre du Vieux-Colombier, son of Anton Suter, a pioneer of the cooperative movement and musician, and Berthe Suter née Ruffy. The couple had four children.

== Death ==
Germaine Suter-Morax died on July 27, 1974, in Pully, Vaud, Switzerland, aged 78.

== Honors ==
Suter-Morax, although considered for the Legion of Honour on the recommendation of the general’s niece, decided to decline this honour. After her death, Geneviève de Gaulle paid tribute to her crucial commitment to the reception of former deportees.

== Bibliography ==
- Exchaquet-Monnier, Brigitte; Monnier, Eric (2013). Retour à la vie. L'accueil en Suisse romande d'anciennes déportées françaises de la Résistance (1945-1947) (in French). Alphil. ISBN 9782940489503.

=== Archival collections ===
- Swiss Federal Archives, Bern, J2.142 1000/1029 (relations between the Swiss Donation for War Victims and the Swiss aid committee of the ADIR).
