= Jean Morax =

- Born: 16 September 1869; Morges, Switzerland
- Died: 11 May 1939 (aged 69); Morges
- Occupations: Painter; Theater decorator; Draftsman

Jean Morax (16 September 1869 – 11 May 1939) was a painter, theater decorator and draftsman from the Canton of Vaud.

== Biography ==
A pupil of Édouard Castres in Geneva then of Benjamin Constant, of Luc-Olivier Merson and Jean-Paul Laurens in Paris, Jean Morax shared his life between Paris, Florence and Switzerland. He exhibited his paintings influenced by the Nabis in Geneva, notably at the National Exhibition (1896), in Paris (bronze medal at the Exposition Universelle (1900)) and in Munich (1905).

With his brother René, he created the Théâtre du Jorat in Mézières in 1903; There, he designed costumes, sets and posters, especially for Henriette (1908), Tell (1914), Le Roi David (1921), and La belle de Moudon. (1931).

He created the costumes of the 1905 Fête des vignerons in Vevey.

== Sources ==
- Jean Morax (1869-1939) on Bibliothèque cantonale et universitaire de Lausanne
- This article incorporates public domain material from websites or documents of the United States Department of Homeland Security.
- Notabilités vaudoises 1933, p. 67
- Marcus Osterwalder Dictionnaire des illustrateurs.
- Patrie suisse, 1917, No 610 p. 26-27
- Patrie suisse, 1903, No 252, p. 119-121
- photo Thibault, Morges Patrie suisse, (E. de B.) 1902, No 216, p. 5-8
- DBAS, 742
- Yvan Schwab, René Morax, un théâtre pour le peuple, 2003
- DTS, 1272-1273
