= Gagnebin =

Gagnebin is a surname. Notable people with the surname include:

- Elie Gagnebin (1891–1949), Swiss geologist
- Henri Gagnebin (1886–1977), Belgian-born Swiss composer
- Laurent Gagnebin (born 1939), Swiss philosopher and Protestant theologian
