= Elie Gagnebin =

Swiss professor of geology

Élie Gagnebin (4 February 1891 – 16 July 1949) was a Swiss professor of geology at the University of Lausanne. He worked on the geology of the prealps. He also contributed greatly by writing popular treatises on the geology of the region and of the earth in general. Trained in the arts, he also wrote poetry and on philosophical matters.

Gagnebin was born in Liege to Protestant pastor Henri-Auguste and his wife Adolphine née Heshuysen of Dutch ancestry. The family moved to Switzerland in 1892 and Gagnebin grew up in Lausanne where he received a bachelor's degree in literature (1909) followed by a degree in science (1912). He then interned in Paris and Grenoble and joined as an assistant lecturer at the University of Lausanne in 1912 becoming a professor in 1933. His work was on the geology of the Romand and Chablais prealps and the Lake Geneva Quaternary. He also popularized the work of Alfred Wegener in France in 1922. A student of Maurice Lugeon, he replaced his position in 1940.

In addition to his work on geology, Élie Gagnebin also left literary and philosophical studies published in the Revue des Belles-Lettres, Dialectica, etc. Linked in particular to Raymond Radiguet and Jean Cocteau, he was at the forefront of the cultural milieu in French-speaking Switzerland, where he was very active and generous. He was a friend of René Auberjonois, Charles-Albert Cingria, Pierre-Louis Matthey, Gustave Roud, C. F. Ramuz, Jean Villard (known as Gilles) and Ernest Ansermet. Passionate about theatre and music, in 1918 he took part in the role of the Reader in the creation of Histoire du soldat (music by Igor Stravinsky and text by C. F. Ramuz).
