= Pavel Ludikar =

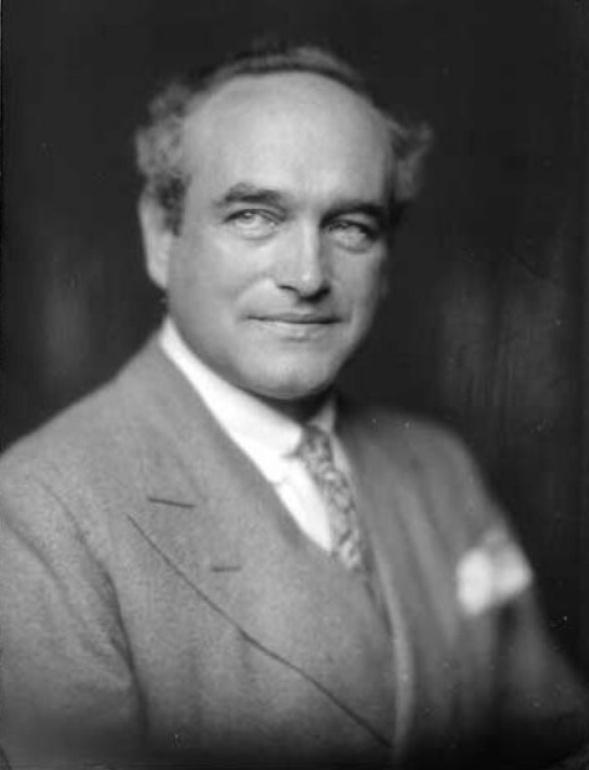
Pavel Ludikar in 1928

Pavel Ludikar (3 March 1882 – 19 February 1970) was a Czech operatic bass who had a highly successful international singing career from 1904 through 1944. He began his career in his native country and by 1911 had arisen at many of the major opera houses in Europe. From 1913 to 1935 his career was mainly centered in North and South America. The peak of his opera career was reached at the Metropolitan Opera in New York City, where he was committed from 1926 to 1932. He returned to Europe in 1935 to assume directorship of the Neues deutsches Theatre in Prague, remaining there until the theatre was closed in September 1938 due to Nazi occupation, effectively ending his stage career. The height of his later years in Prague was his portrayal of the title hero in the world premiere of Ernst Krenek's Karl V in June 1938.

One of the great singer-actors of his generation, Ludikar sang a broad repertoire of music which encompassed a total of twelve languages. He was particularly loved for his portrayals of roles in operas by Richard Wagner, Wolfgang Amadeus Mozart, and Giacomo Puccini. Ludikar began teaching singing in Prague in 1941. In 1947 he joined the faculty at the Vienna Music Academy, where he taught until his death almost three decades later. He also gave annual master classes at the Mozarteum University of Salzburg for many years. His voice is preserved on a number of recordings from the Supraphon label.

== Early life and education: 1882–1904 ==
Born Pavel Vyskočil in Prague, his father was a conductor at the Prague Opera and his mother, Františka Ludikarová-Vyskočilová, was an operatic contralto. He first studied law and philosophy at the University of Prague and then trained as a concert pianist. In 1901, at the age of 19, he traveled throughout North America giving piano concerts. Upon his return home he decided he wanted to pursue a singing career and began opera studies with first his mother and then Jean Lassalle in Paris. He made his professional opera debut at the National Theatre in his native city in 1904 as Sarastro in The Magic Flute.

== International success: 1905–1938 ==
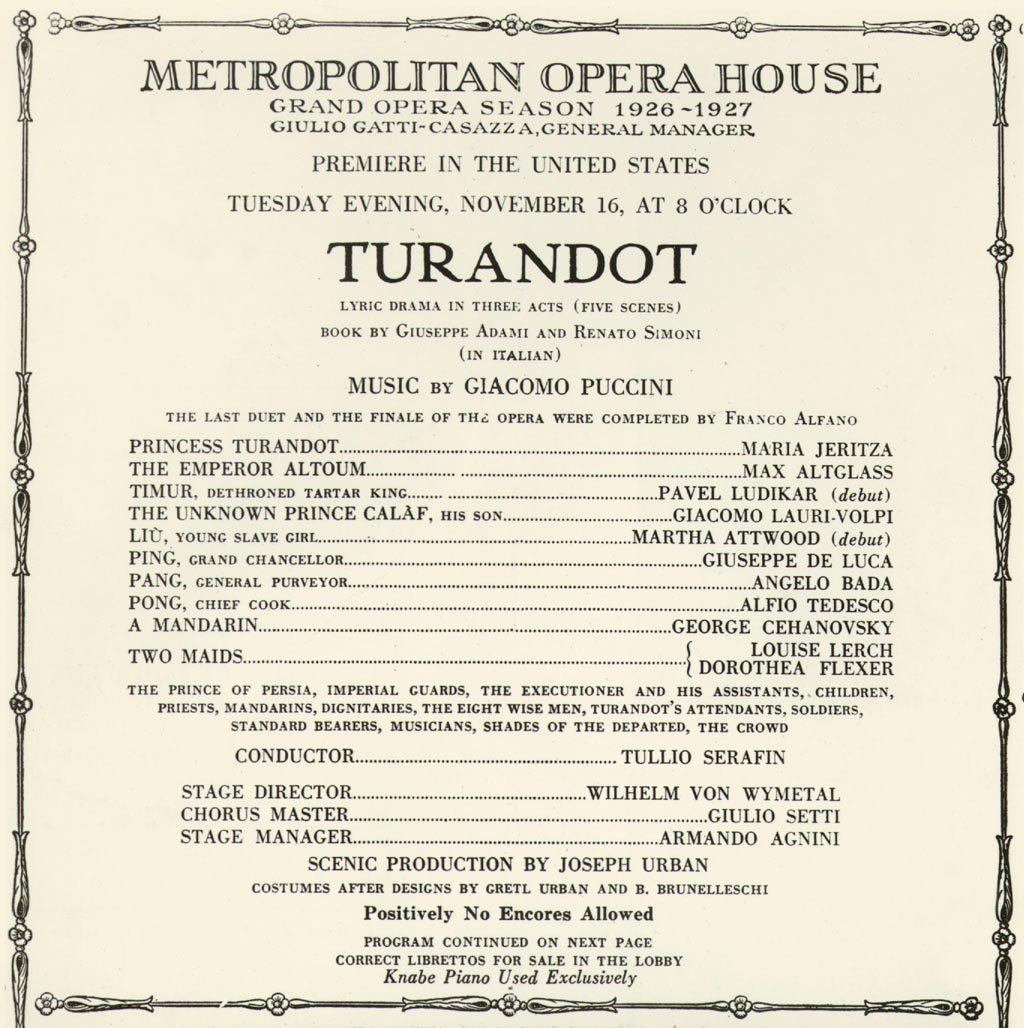
Turandot MET Premiere Program 1926

After several more initial successes in Prague, he made a number of highly lauded guest appearances at the Vienna Volksoper and the Semperoper in Dresden. He reached La Scala in Milan in 1911 where he sang in the Italian premières of Richard Strauss's Der Rosenkavalier (as Ochs) and Engelbert Humperdinck's Königskinder (as the Fiddler). Other roles he appeared in at La Scala included Bluebeard in Ariane et Barbe-bleue, Falstaff in Otto Nicolai's The Merry Wives of Windsor, Geronimo in Domenico Cimarosa's Il matrimonio segreto, and both Pagner and Hans Sachs in Die Meistersinger von Nürnberg.

In the years before World War II, Ludikar performed at the opera houses in Rome, Trieste, Turin, Paris, Budapest and Havana. In 1911, 1913, and 1920 he was committed to the Teatro Colón in Buenos Aires, where he was an admired Wotan in The Ring Cycle and King Marke in Tristan und Isolde. In 1913-1914 he worked with the Boston Opera Company, having a great success there as Archibaldo in Italo Montemezzi's L'amore dei tre re and in the role of Hans Sachs. In 1917 he was committed to the Zurich Opera where he portrayed such roles as Leporello in Don Giovanni, the Speaker in The Magic Flute, and Oreste in Strauss's Elektra.

From 1926 to 1932 Ludikar was a member of the Metropolitan Opera in New York City. He made his debut at the house on November 16, 1926 as Timur in the United States premiere of Giacomo Puccini's Turandot with Maria Jeritza in the title role, Giacomo Lauri-Volpi as Calàf, Martha Attwood as Liù, and Tullio Serafin conducting. He sang in several more United States premieres with the company including Puccini's La Rondine (March 10, 1928, Rambaldo), Ildebrando Pizzetti's Fra Gherardo (March 21, 1929, Guido), Giuseppe Verdi's Luisa Miller (December 21, 1929, Wurm), Nikolai Rimsky-Korsakov's Sadko (January 25, 1930, the Sea King), and Felice Lattuada's Le Preziose Ridicole (December 10, 1930, Gorgibus).

Although he was most often seen in operas by Puccini, Mozart, and Wagner, Ludikar sang an incredibly diverse repertoire at the Met; pulling from the leading bass, basso buffo, and comprimario repertoires. His repertoire there included Alvise in La Gioconda, Archibaldo, Capulet in Roméo et Juliette, Ashby in La Fanciulla del West, Colline in La Bohème, Daland in The Flying Dutchman, Don Alfonso in Così Fan Tutte, Ferrando in Il trovatore, Geronte in Manon Lescaut, Gesler in William Tell, Golaud in Pelléas et Mélisande, Hermann in Tannhäuser, Hunding in Die Walküre, Leporello, Kecal in The Bartered Bride, King Heinrich in Lohengrin, King Marke, Mathieu in Andrea Chénier, Pedro in L'Africaine, Peter in Hänsel und Gretel, Pogner, Ramfis in Aida, Rocco in Fidelio, Sarastro, Simone in Gianni Schicchi, and Sparafucile in Rigoletto. His final and 220th performance with the Met was as Coppélius in Les Contes d'Hoffmann for an out of town engagement in Cleveland, Ohio on April 23, 1932.

After leaving the Met, Ludikar toured the United States for a few years with the Hinshaw Grand Opera Company. He returned to Europe in 1935 when he became director of the Neues deutsches Theatre in Prague. In the 1930s, with the growing Nazi threat, the Neues deutsches Theatre was among the bastions of democracy, serving as a refuge for artists from Germany. Political developments shortly before signature of the Munich Agreement coupled with financial problems led to the theatre's closing in September 1938, effectively ending Ludikar's opera career. The great achievement of his later years in Prague was his portrayal of the title role in the world premiere of Ernst Krenek's Karl V on 22 June 1938.

== Career as teacher: 1939–1970 ==
During the years of World War II, Ludikar continued to perform in concerts in Germany and Austria. He taught singing in Prague from 1941 to 1943. In 1944 he taught master classes at the Mozarteum University of Salzburg and gave his final public concerts in that city in that year. He then returned to Prague.

After the end of World War II, Ludikar wanted to move to Austria but was forbidden to leave by the now Soviet controlled government in his country. He spent the next couple years living in seclusion in the vicinity of Prague. He managed to leave the country in late 1947 upon which time he joined the faculty of the Vienna Music Academy. He taught there and gave annual masterclasses at the Salzburg Mozarteum up until his death in Vienna in 1970. He also served for a few years as the director of the opera house in Graz.

== Documents ==
Documents by Pavel Ludikar in the Saechsisches Staatsarchiv Leipzig.
