= Virginia Seay =

American composer and musicologist (1922–2015)

Virginia Claire Seay Ploeser (8 August 1922 – 23 November 2015) was an American composer and musicologist who studied and collaborated with composer Ernst Krenek. She published her works under the name Virginia Seay.

Seay was born in Palo Alto, California, to Claire Soule and Welford Seay. She studied with Krenek at Vassar College, where she earned a degree in music composition in 1944, followed by a master's degree from Hamline University in St. Paul, Minnesota, also under Krenek's tutelage. She married James Ploeser in 1944, and they had three children, Monica, Stephen, and Christine.

During Seay's time in Minnesota in the 1940s, one of her compositions was performed by the Minneapolis Symphony Orchestra. In 1945, she won the third Young Composers Contest of the Federation of Music Clubs with her composition San Clemente, Low Tide, which was broadcast on national radio. Krenek performed piano music she composed at a concert at Black Mountain College in Asheville, North Carolina.

At Hamline, Seay collaborated with Krenek to translate his opera Karl V. from German to English. Krenek used a motif composed by Seay in his Hurricane Variations for Piano, opus 100 in 1944. The following year, in his composition Tricks and Trifles, Krenek composed 22 variations on a four-note motif from a string quartet composed by Seay. Krenek and Seay collaborated (with Russell G. Harris and Martha Johnson) on the book Hamline Studies in Musicology. It included a chapter by Seay, "A Contribution to the Problem of Mode in Medieval Music".

Seay's family lived in New Zealand from 1949 to 1954, where her husband had a Fulbright Scholarship to teach abroad. From 1957 to 2013, Seay taught music and other subjects in Catholic schools in San Jose and San Francisco.

Seay's compositions are numbered through at least opus 8 (see below). Her works include:

== Book ==
- Hamline Studies in Musicology (with Ernst Krenek, Russell G. Harris & Martha Johnson)

== Chamber ==
- San Clemente, Low Tide (flute, oboe, clarinet, timpani and strings)
- Sonata, Opus 8 (for clarinet)
- String Quartet

== Orchestra ==
- work performed by the Minneapolis Symphony Orchestra

== Piano ==
- Nine Short Piano Pieces

== Vocal ==
- Choral works
- Songs
