= Eduard Erdmann =

Baltic German pianist and composer (1896 - 1958)

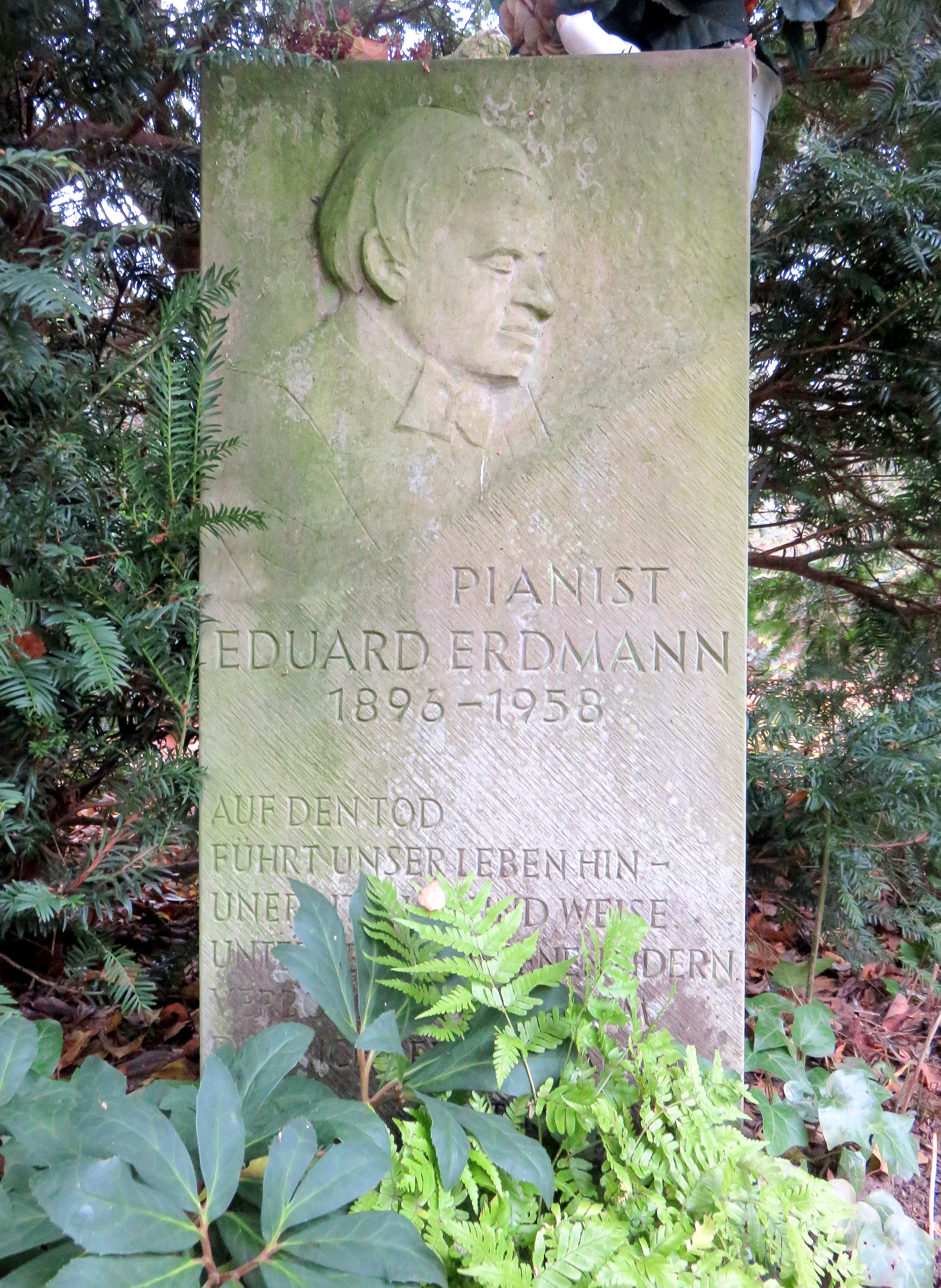
Tombstone of Eduard Erdmann at the Ohlsdorf cemetery (Hamburg)

Eduard Erdmann (5 March 1896 – 21 June 1958) was a Baltic German pianist and composer.

Erdmann was born in Wenden (Cēsis) in the Governorate of Livonia. He was the great-nephew of the philosopher Johann Eduard Erdmann. His first musical studies were in Riga, where his teachers were Bror Möllersten and Jean du Chastain (piano) and Harald Creutzburg (harmony and counterpoint). From 1914 he studied piano in Berlin with Conrad Ansorge and composition with Heinz Tiessen. In the 1920s and early 1930s his name was frequently cited among Germany's leading composers. Moreover, Erdmann had an international reputation as an outstanding concert pianist whose repertoire encompassed Beethoven and the advocacy of contemporary music. In 1925, he gave the premiere of Artur Schnabel's Piano Sonata, at the Venice ISCM Festival.

From 1925 he was professor of piano at the Cologne Academy of Music but was forced to resign from his post by the Nazis in 1935 and became an 'inner exile', composing almost nothing until after the end of World War II. He joined the Nazi Party in 1937; while not in sympathy with National Socialism, his decision was to avoid government harassment so that he could continue to work, like several other German musicians at the time. This action ruined his post-war reputation, and it did not recover in his lifetime. He resumed teaching as Professor of Piano at the Hochschule für Musik in Hamburg in 1950, but died of a heart-attack in 1958. His students at Hamburg included Aloys and Alfons Kontarsky. There has been little revival of interest in his own music and all his post-World War II works remain in manuscript; considering his inter-war eminence, he has received remarkably little attention up to the present day, but in 2006 the cpo label began issuing a series of CDs of his orchestral works.

Erdmann came to critical notice as a composer with the sensational success of his First Symphony (dedicated to Alban Berg) in 1919. He was also close friends with Ferruccio Busoni's pupil Philipp Jarnach, as well as Ernst Krenek, Artur Schnabel and Emil Nolde. Like Tiessen and Schnabel, he was deeply impressed by Schoenbergian and Bergian Expressionism but did not adopt the twelve-note method, preferring a freely and often totally chromatic vocabulary with little or no sense of key. His total output is quite small, and surprisingly contains very little piano music: but it came to include four symphonies, Nos. 3 and 4 dating from after World War II and thus still unpublished (although the Third Symphony was recorded and released on the cpo label with the Capricci opus 21). As early as 1920 Erdmann issued a credo in which he declared himself opposed to the extreme individualism in music from Ludwig van Beethoven to Arnold Schoenberg, and dedicated instead to the creation of a more objective music characterized by what he called the 'third-person forms' created by composers from Heinrich Schütz to Anton Bruckner.

Between 1921 and 1943, Erdmann often appeared with the Australian violinist Alma Moodie, who lived in Germany. Erdmann dedicated his Sonata for Solo Violin, Op. 12 (1921) to her, and she premiered it in Berlin in October 1921. The Australian-English critic Walter J. Turner wrote of a recital he heard them play in London in April 1934, ‘it was the best violin piano duo that I have ever heard’. Their last concert together was given on 4 March 1943, three days before Alma Moodie's death, when they were in the middle of the cycle of Beethoven sonatas.

== List of works ==
- An den Frühling for violin and piano, Op. 1
- Am Gardasee, tone poem, Op. 4 (destroyed)
- 7 Bagatelles for piano, Op. 5
- 5 Little Piano Pieces, Op. 6
- Fox Trot in C (dedicated to Ernst Krenek)
- Rondo for Orchestra, Op. 9
- Symphony No. 1, Op. 10
- Sonata for solo violin, Op. 12 (dedicated to Alma Moodie)
- Symphony No. 2, Op. 13
- Die entsprungene Insel, operetta, Op. 14 (never scored)
- Piano Concerto, Op. 15
- Ständchen for small orchestra, Op. 16
- String Quartet, Op. 17
- Concertino (Rhapsody & Rondo) for piano and orchestra, Op. 18
- Symphony No. 3, Op. 19 (unpublished)
- Symphony No. 4, Op. 20 (unpublished)
- Capricci for orchestra, Op. 21 (unpublished)
- Monogramme - eine kleine Serenade for orchestra, Op. 22 (unpublished)
