= Atar Roto Presse =

Swiss printing company

- Formerly: Société genevoise d'édition (1896–1905); Atar (1905–1997)
- Industry: Printing
- Founded: 1896 (Société genevoise d'édition); 1996 (present company)
- Founder: George W. Brooke
- Headquarters: Satigny, Switzerland
- Services: Offset printing (sheet-fed, rotary and digital)
- Number of employees: 160 (2001)
- Website: atar.ch

Atar Roto Presse SA is a Swiss printing company in Satigny. It traces its history to Atar, a Geneva company founded in 1896 as the Société genevoise d'édition. Originally a publisher and printer of art books and illustrated posters, Atar sold its publishing business in 1926 and concentrated on printing.

== History ==
Atar was founded in 1896 by George W. Brooke, the creator of the illustrated magazine La Patrie suisse, as a graphic arts joint-stock company (société anonyme) under the name Société genevoise d'édition (SGE); it resulted from the merger of seven businesses. It grew rapidly and in 1905 adopted the name Atar, from ATeliers ARtistiques ("artistic workshops"). At first it published and printed art books and illustrated posters, and ran a bookshop. In 1926 it sold its publishing business to Payot and its bookshop to Naville SA, and concentrated on printing administrative brochures and a few books with large print runs. In 1950 it had a turnover of 24 million francs and 150 employees.

From 1956 to 1993 it produced continuous forms. From 1971 it turned again to high-quality production, with a phototypesetting workshop and four-color offset presses. In 1989 Atar bought the commercial printing works of the Journal de Genève, and in 1995, together with Roto-Sadag SA and the Imprimerie Sprint, it founded the company CAG Centre d'arts graphiques SA in Satigny. In 1996 CAG contributed the assets of its printing works to a newly founded company, Atar SA, in Satigny; with new articles of association in December 1997, this company took the name Atar Roto Presse SA. In 2001 the company had 160 employees.

== Bibliography ==
- ATAR Arts graphiques Genève, [1946]
- Encyclopédie de Genève, 7, 108–110
