= L'Histoire du soldat =

Theatrical composition by Igor Stravinsky

- English: Tale of the Soldier
- Music: Igor Stravinsky
- Lyrics: Charles Ferdinand Ramuz
- Basis: The Runaway Soldier and the Devil by Alexander Afanasyev
- Premiere: 28 September 1918: Théâtre Municipal, Lausanne

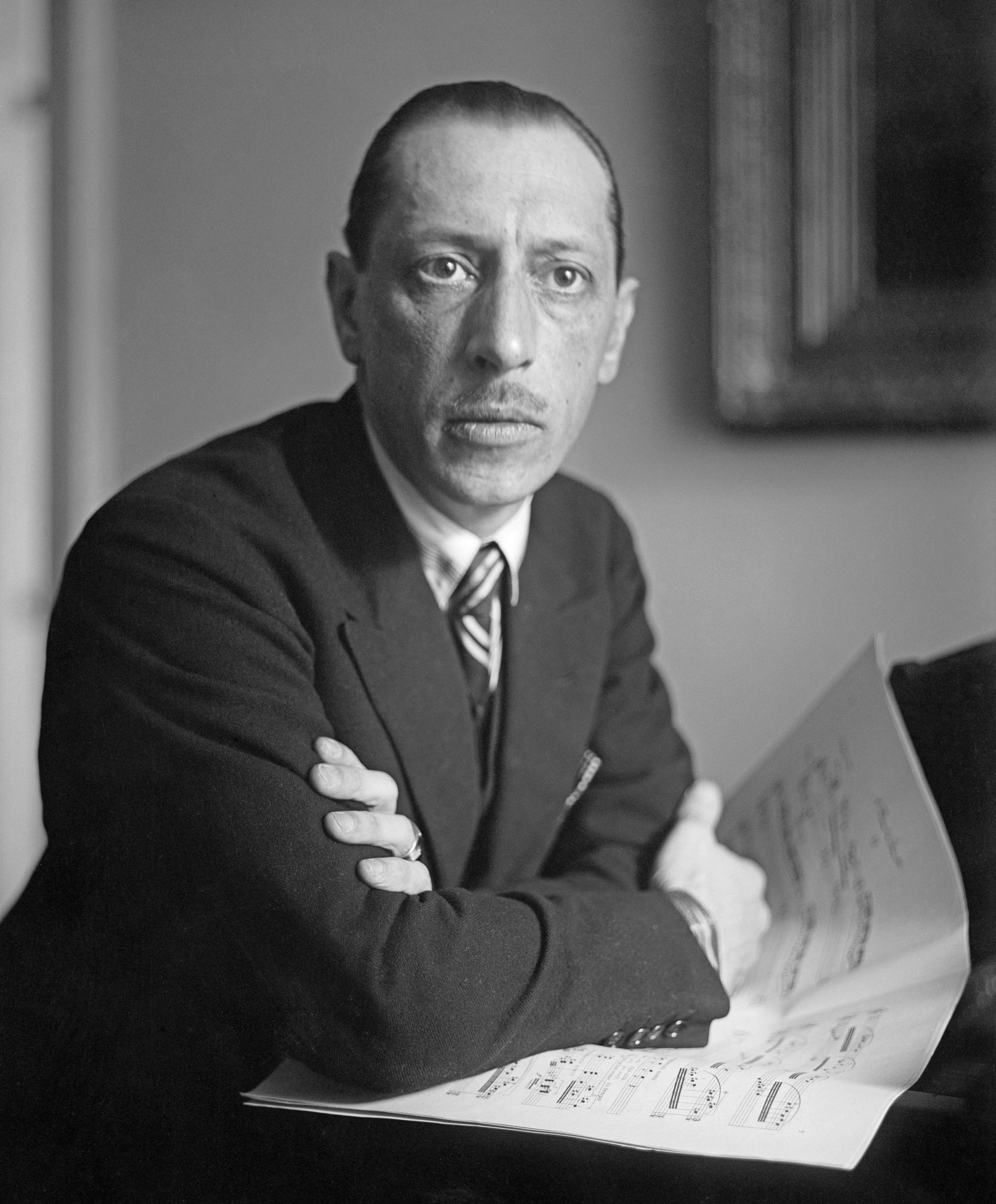
Igor Stravinsky in the early 1920s

L'Histoire du soldat, or Tale of the Soldier (as it was first published), is an hour-long 1918 theatrical work to be "read, played and danced (lue, jouée et dansée)" by three actors, one or more dancers, and a septet of instruments. Its music is by Igor Stravinsky and its libretto, in French, by Swiss writer Charles Ferdinand Ramuz. Together they based their work on The Runaway Soldier and the Devil, the Russian tale from Alexander Afanasyev's collection.

Ernest Ansermet conducted the premiere on 28 September 1918 in Lausanne with the support of Swiss philanthropist Werner Reinhart, to whom Stravinsky gifted the manuscript and dedicated the work.

== Music ==
L'Histoire du soldat is scored for clarinet, bassoon, cornet (often played on trumpet), trombone, percussion, violin and double bass. Because the music is rife with changing time signatures, performances of L'Histoire are often led by a conductor.

Stravinsky's absorption of many musical influences is shown in the pasodoble of the Marche royale, the range of dances (tango, waltz, ragtime) as played by Joseph to cure the Princess, the klezmer-like instrumental texture, and the use of Luther's "A Mighty Fortress Is Our God" in the Petit choral and of Bach in the Grand choral. According to the musicologist Danick Trottier, these influences are linked to a certain extent to Stravinsky's experiences and first successes in the cosmopolitan Paris of the early 1910s, a cultural capital for artists and musicians during La Belle Époque.

Reinhart continued his support of Stravinsky's work in 1919 by funding a series of concerts of his recent chamber music. These included a suite of five numbers from L'Histoire du soldat arranged for clarinet, violin, and piano in a nod to Reinhart, an amateur clarinetist. This was first performed on 8 November 1919, also in Lausanne.

Stravinsky later created a suite scored for all seven original instruments. In 1918-19 he wrote an independent third version of the work, not a transcription, for piano solo, published in 1922.

== Drama ==
The libretto uses three actors to tell the story of a soldier who trades his violin to the Devil in return for vast economic gain: the Narrator, who both narrates and impersonates several minor characters; the Devil, who assumes various guises; and the Soldier, identified with no army. A dancer takes the usually silent role of the Princess.

The work's sixteen narrative and instrumental sections alternate and are not intended to overlap.

=== Part 1 ===
Joseph Duprat, the Soldier, is walking exhausted toward his hometown on a 15-day leave, pack in tow. (Marche du soldat / The Soldier's March). He rests by a stream. From his pack he takes out his lucky St. Joseph medallion, then a mirror, next a picture of his fiancée, and finally his violin. He begins to play. (Petits airs au bord du ruisseau / Airs by the Stream). The Devil appears disguised as an old man carrying a butterfly net. Joseph does not notice him but continues to play. The Devil sneaks up from behind and startles him.

The Devil asks Joseph to sell him his violin, but is refused. He offers Joseph a book that he says will lead to untold wealth. Joseph says he does not know how to read, but the Devil convinces him it is worth more than his cheap violin. As Joseph tries to read aloud and to understand the book, he realizes that it tells the future of the stock market. He accepts the Devil's offer to spend three days at the Devil's home in great luxury to learn about the book and teach the Devil the violin. After they agree on these terms, the Devil takes Joseph the rest of his way home. (Reprise: Marche du soldat).

Once in his hometown Joseph notices something strange: everyone runs away as they see him. He arrives at his fiancée's house only to find her with husband and children. Finally he realizes that three years, not three days, have passed and that his former neighbors and friends think he is a ghost. (Pastorale).

Joseph sees the Devil disguised as a cattle merchant and confronts him. The Devil tries to calm Joseph by reminding him of the book's power: Joseph started off as a peddler but with the knowledge gained from the book quickly amassed wealth. The Soldier realizes this wealth means nothing. All he wants is what he had before, the things everyone else has. (Reprise: Petits airs). Agitated, he leafs through the book for a solution without success.

The Devil arrives, now disguised as an old woman peddler. She offers for sale a lucky medallion, a mirror, a picture of a woman, and then a violin. Joseph moves to buy the violin, but when she hands it over he finds he can no longer play: it makes no sound. (Reprise: Petits airs). He hurls it away and tears up the book.

=== Part 2 ===
Joseph leaves his home with nothing and marches through town. (Reprise: Marche du soldat). He arrives at an inn where he hears that the king's daughter is sick and that whoever can raise her from her bed will be given her hand in marriage. He makes his way to the palace. (Marche royale / Royal March).

The Devil is already at the palace disguised as a virtuoso violinist. Joseph turns over some cards and gains confidence when they are all hearts. The Devil makes his presence known, clutching the violin to his chest and taunting Joseph. The Narrator informs Joseph that the Devil still controls him because he retains the Devil's money, and if he can lose all of it to the Devil in a card game he will be free.

This the Soldier does. He then takes the violin and plays. (Petit concert / Little Concert). He triumphantly marches into the Princess's chambers where he plays another tune. Miraculously the music revives her, and she begins a sequence of dances. (Trois danses / Three Dances: Tango, Waltz, Ragtime).

As the two embrace the Devil arrives, now undisguised for the first time. Joseph shields the Princess. He realizes he can defeat the Devil by playing his violin. (Danse du diable / Dance of the Devil). Unable to resist the music, the Devil begins to contort, grows exhausted, and falls to the ground. Joseph takes the Princess's hand and together they drag the Devil away before falling into each other's arms. (Petit choral / Little Chorale).

But the Devil pops his head in and begins to torment the couple, warning that Joseph may not leave the palace without the Devil regaining control of him. (Couplets du diable / The Devil's Couplets).

==== Conclusion ====
Over the Grand choral / Great Chorale, the Narrator states the moral:

Il ne faut pas vouloir ajouter
À ce qu'on a, ce qu'on avait;
On ne peut pas être à la fois
Qui on est et qui on était.
Il faut savoir choisir;
On n'a pas le droit de tout avoir:
C'est défendu.
Un bonheur est tout le bonheur;
Deux, c'est comme s'ils n'existaient plus.

You must not seek to add
To what you have, what you once had;
You have no right to share
What you are with what you were.
No one can have it all:
That is forbidden;
You must learn to choose between.
One happy thing is every happy thing;
Two, is as if they had never been.

Joseph crossed the frontier, a boundary not to be crossed, after being tempted by the idea of having both his wife and his mother. The Devil is waiting as Joseph turns back to find his Princess gone. (Marche triomphale du diable / The Devil's Triumphant March): violin and percussion entwined in a rhythmic duel, the final measures played solely by the percussionist; here the score is marked decrescendo to the end, although this may be changed to crescendo when performing the Suite.

== Translations into English and German ==
The original French text by Ramuz has been translated into English by Michael Flanders and Kitty Black, and into German by the poet Hans Reinhart.

An English translation by British dramatist Jeremy Sams was performed for the first time in 2003 by The Philharmonia Orchestra at St George's Bristol. The translation was later used in a television adaptation for BBC Four in 2022.

A translation by Welsh librettist Paul Griffiths was performed at the Linbury Studio, Royal Opera House, London in 2004 and again in 2010 with players from the New York Philharmonic under Valery Gergiev at Avery Fisher Hall with Alec Baldwin as the narrator.

== Performance history ==
=== World premiere ===
- 28 September 1918: Lausanne, Switzerland. Conducted by Ernest Ansermet. Cast: Gabriel Rosset as the Soldier, Jean Villard as the Devil (speaking parts), and Elie Gagnebin as the Narrator. Choreography by Georges Pitoëff, who also danced the role of the Devil opposite his wife Ludmilla as the Princess. Sets and costumes by René Auberjonois.

=== UK ===
- 1920: Concert Suite, London, conducted by Ernest Ansermet.
- 1926: First full staging, Newcastle upon Tyne, conducted by Edward Clark.
- 1927: Three further fully staged performances in London.
- 1971, 1975, 1996, 2001, 2008, 2018: Performances at the BBC Proms.

=== France ===
- 1924: First full staging in Paris, produced by Sergei Diaghilev.

=== Germany ===
- 1924: Frankfurt, and Wiesbaden, conducted by Otto Klemperer.

=== US ===
- The United States premiere took place on 25 March 1928 in New York City. It was a joint presentation by the League of Composers and the International Composers' Guild. The historic performance was held at the Jolson Theatre (later renamed the Century Theatre) in Manhattan, conducted by Pierre Monteux.
- 1978: Ballet version, New York City Opera, New York State Theater, Lincoln Center. Directed by Frank Corsaro and Gardner Compton (who also choreographed), conducted by Imre Palló. Scenic and costume design by Victor Capecce; lighting design by Ken Billington. Barry Bostwick played the title role and the Princess was portrayed by Mercedes Ellington. John Lankston and the New York City Opera Dancers completed the cast. Presented on a triple bill with La voix humaine and The Impresario.
- 1981: Premiere of Suite from L'Histoire du Soldat, created by balletmaster Peter Martins for New York City Ballet, at the New York State Theater, Lincoln Center on 30 January. Original cast: Darci Kistler, Kyra Nichols, Ib Andersen, Heather Watts, Jean-Pierre Frohlich, Victor Castelli, Bart Cook, and Daniel Duell.
- 1987: Revival of the Martins ballet.
- 1999: Further revival of the Martins ballet, reviewed by Jack Anderson.

=== Canada ===
- 1949: Narrated version, Montreal Festivals.
- 1955: Staged version, Stratford Shakespearean Festival, directed by Douglas Campbell. Costume design by Clarence Wilson. Lillian Jarvis as the Princess, Marcel Marceau as the Devil, Douglas Rain as the Soldier, narrated by William Needles.

=== Costa Rica ===
- 8 June 1973: Partial staging performed by the National Symphony Orchestra of Costa Rica. Conducted by Gerald Brown, with Maria Jimena Lasansky as the featured dancer. Presented at the National Theatre of Costa Rica
- 27 October 2020: Full staging performed by the National Symphony Orchestra of Costa Rica. Conducted by Alejandro Gutiérrez at the Melico Salazar Theatre
- 29 October 2020: Concert Suite performed by the Heredia Symphony Orchestra. Conducted by Eddie Mora at the National Theatre of Costa Rica.

== Recordings ==
- Anthony Nicholls (Narrator), Terence Longdon (Soldier), Robert Helpmann (Devil), Arthur Leavins (violin), Jack Brymer (clarinet), Gwydion Brooke (bassoon), Richard Walton (cornet), Sidney Langston (trombone), Edmond Chesterman (double bass), Stephen Whittaker (percussion), conducted by John Pritchard, based on Glyndebourne Opera production 1954 at Edinburgh Festival, LP His Master's Voice ALP 1377.
- L'Histoire du soldat (Suite). Igor Stravinsky conducts the Columbia Chamber Ensemble, 1961, issued as part of "Igor Stravinsky: The Recorded Legacy", Sony, 1991.
- L'Histoire du soldat (Suite). Gennady Rozhdestvensky conducts a chamber ensemble [no name provided], Angel/Melodiya, 1964.
- L'Histoire du soldat (Suite). Tashi (version for violin, clarinet, and piano), RCA Red Seal, 1977.
- Jean Cocteau (Narrator), Jean-Marie Fertey (Soldier), Peter Ustinov (Devil), Anne Tonietti (Princess), studio ensemble, conducted by Igor Markevitch, Philips Records, 1962 production, recorded at Vevey, Switzerland.
- Brian Phelan (Soldier), Robert Helpmann (Devil), Svetlana Beriosova (Princess), Melos Ensemble, film version 1964, Michael Birkett (director), Dennis Miller and Leonard Cassini (producers), Richard Marden (editor), BHE production.
- Madeleine Milhaud (Narrator), Jean-Pierre Aumont (Soldier), Martial Singher (Devil), instrumental ensemble conducted by Leopold Stokowski, 1967, Vanguard Records, double album, sequential recordings in French and English.
- Gérard Carrat (Narrator), François Berthet (Soldier), François Simon (Devil), conducted by Charles Dutoit, 1970, Erato ECD .88198 (this and the Cocteau/Ustinov Philips version listed above are generally considered the best recordings, the Philips being more theatrical – including a speaking part for the princess – but less realistic in terms of the diction of the characters).
- Glenda Jackson (Narrator), Rudolf Nureyev (Soldier), Micheál Mac Liammóir (Devil), instrumental ensemble conducted by Gennady Zalkowitsch, Argo.
- John Gielgud (Narrator), Tom Courtenay (Soldier), Ron Moody (Devil), Boston Symphony Chamber Players, 1975, Deutsche Grammophon.
- Ian McKellen (Narrator), Sting (Soldier), Vanessa Redgrave (Devil), London Sinfonietta conducted by Kent Nagano, 1990, London: Pangea/MCA, ASIN B000009HYG.
- Frank Zappa recorded the march from The Soldier's Tale on his live album Make a Jazz Noise Here (1991). The same melody was also used at the ending of "Soft-Sell Conclusion" on the second Mothers Of Invention album, Absolutely Free (1967). On 6 September 1972, Zappa narrated in a performance by the Los Angeles Philharmonic under Lukas Foss at the Hollywood Bowl; Ernest Fleischmann as devil and Tim Buckley as soldier.
- Sally Goodwin (Narrator), Ron Bohmer (Soldier), Reed Armstrong (Devil), Solisti New York, conducted by Ransom Wilson, 1993, Chesky Records, also available as a download from HDtracks.
- Aage Haugland, Royal Scottish National Orchestra, conducted by Neeme Järvi (CHAN9189), 1993
- Carole Bouquet (Narrator), Guillaume Depardieu (Soldier), Gérard Depardieu (Devil), Shlomo Mintz (violin and conductor), Pascal Moragues (clarinet), Sergio Azzolini (bassoon), Marc Bauer (cornet), Daniel Breszynski (trombone), Vincent Pasquier (double bass), Michel Cerutti (percussion), CD (B000003I1K) 1997 Auvidis Valois France.
- Jeremy Irons / The Columbia Chamber Ensemble / Igor Stravinsky and Robert Craft. New York: Sony BMG, 2007. 82876-76586-2
- In 2018, Roger Waters recorded a version in which he narrates his adaptation of the story and portrays all characters, recorded with members of the Bridgehampton Chamber Music Festival, released on Sony Classical Masterworks.

== Adaptations ==
=== Stage and theatrical performances ===
- In 1983, Bil Baird created his final puppeteering work based on L'Histoire before his death in 1987.
- In 1986, a musical adaptation, entitled "A Good Life" was performed at the Kennedy Center, with book and lyrics by Jeff Moss and music by Stanley Silverman. Directed by A.J. Antoon, the cast featured Marion J. Caffey, Sara Carbone, Karen Culliver, Marc Stephen DelGatto, Mark Enis, Laura Kenyon, David Schramm, Gordon Stanley and Greg Zerkle.
- In 1993, United States novelist and playwright Kurt Vonnegut reworked the libretto into a tale about World War II Private Eddie Slovik, the first soldier in the United States military to be executed for desertion since the Civil War.
- In 2002, Joan Sanmartí recorded a jazz arrangement version scored for a septet of electric guitar, tenor saxophone/clarinet/bass clarinet, trumpet/flugelhorn, cello, accordion, double bass, and drums, including solo improvisations by most of the interpreters.
- In January 2006, Rebecca Lenkiewicz and Abdulkareem Kasid created a version set in Iraq and staged by Andrew Steggall at The Old Vic.
- In 2008, Inuk writer Zebedee Nungak translated the libretto into Inuktitut for performance by the Montreal Symphony Orchestra's tour of Nunavik (the Inuit homeland in Quebec), conducted by Kent Nagano.
- In 2022, the Peninsula Symphony of Los Altos, California, commissioned playwright Carol Wolf to write an updated libretto for A Soldier's Tale. It was performed on 13 November 2022. Her version tells the story of an American soldier who meets Death on the road in Iraq, with choreography by Arielle Cole, and danced by Cole's company ArcTangent.
- In 2024, poet Titilope Sonuga wrote Sankofa: The Soldier's Tale Retold, performed by the Art of Time Ensemble in Toronto. This version tells the story of a fictional soldier from the No. 2 Construction Battalion, the only Canadian battalion composed of Black soldiers to serve in the First World War, and his struggles to be accepted by the army and then his trauma after, as he reclaims what was forgotten (the African concept of Sankofa).
- In 2026, the National University of Costa Rica adapted the play by relocating the story to a setting shaped by organized crime and contemporary violence. It was directed by Gabrio Zapelli and featured an interdisciplinary cast of actors, dancers and musicians. The work reframed the original themes of war, ambition and moral compromise through a Costa Rican context. It was performed six times, three at the Dance Theater of Costa Rica (June 12, 13 and 14) and three at the Atahualpa del Cioppo Theater (June 19, 20 and 21).

=== Television ===
- In 1984, animator R. O. Blechman created an animated version for season 11 of PBS's Great Performances. It featured Max von Sydow as the voice of the Devil. This production was released on VHS the next year and on DVD in 2004.
- In 2022, an adaptation of L'Histoire du soldat, entitled The Soldier's Tale, was broadcast on BBC Four, featuring a new translation by Jeremy Sams. The 59-minute production was directed by Dominic Best, with music performed by The Hallé and conducted by Sir Mark Elder. The show starred Richard Katz as the narrator, Martins Imhangbe as the Soldier, Mark Lockyer as the Devil, and Faith Prendergast as Princess.
