= Alexandre Dénéréaz =

Swiss composer

- Born: 31 July 1875; Lausanne, Switzerland
- Died: 25 July 1947 (aged 71); Lausanne, Switzerland
- Education: Hochschule für Musik Carl Maria von Weber
- Occupations: Composer; Music educator; Organ player; Choral leader

Alexandre Denéréaz (or Alexandre Dénéréaz; 31 July 1875 – 25 July 1947) was a Swiss musician, composer, organist and teacher in the Canton of Vaud. His work was part of the music event in the art competition at the 1928 Summer Olympics.

== Biography ==
Alexandre Denéréaz studied classics, science and music. In 1892 he left for Dresden where he enrolled for 4 years at the Royal Conservatory and worked the piano with Karl-Heinrich Doering (1834–1916), pipe organ with Julius Johannsen (1852–1921) and musical composition with Felix Draeseke (1835–1913). In 1896, he obtained the first prize for composition for his "First Symphony".

Back in Lausanne in 1896, he was appointed organist at Saint-François. In the same year, he succeeded his former teacher of composition, harmony and counterpoint, Charles Blanchet, at the Lausanne Conservatory. He conducted the Société mixte Sainte-Cécile, as well as the men choral La Recréation of Yverdon-les-Bains. In 1899 he became a founding member of the Swiss Musicians' Association. In 1903, he composed the Cantate pour le centenaire de l'indépendance vaudoise, after a text by René Morax. Denereaz's musicologic work counts several treatises, including Cours d'Harmonie, Rythmes cosmiques et rythmes humains and La gamme, ce problème cosmique. Dénéréaz's principal work remains La musique et la vie intérieure. Several personalities of the musical world had epistolary contacts with Denéréaz about this book, in particular Nadia Boulanger and Alfred Cortot.

Alexandre Denéréaz died 25 July 1947 in Lausanne.

== Sources ==
- Alexandre Denéréaz
- Dictionnaire des musiciens suisses, Zurich, Atlantis Verlag, 1964, p. 90
- Jean-Louis Matthey, Alexandre Denéréaz, Inventaire du fonds musical, Lausanne, Bibliothèque cantonale et universitaire - Lausanne, 1983, p. 11-21
- photo Nitsche, Lausanne, Patrie suisse, (A. B.), 1903, No 248, p. 65-66
