= Karl V. (opera) =

Opera by Ernst Krenek

- Opera by Ernst Krenek
- Titian's Last Judgment, owned by the emperor (depicted in a white robe at the upper right), and called for as a stage backdrop (El Prado)
- Description: Bühnenwerk mit Musik
- Librettist: Krenek
- Language: German
- Based on: Charles V
- Premiere: 22 June 1938; Neues Deutsches Theater, Prague

Karl V. is an opera, described as a Bühnenwerk mit Musik (stage work with music) by Ernst Krenek, his opus 73. The German libretto is by the composer. His student Virginia Seay collaborated with him on the English translation of the libretto.

The first completed full-length twelve-tone opera tells the story of Emperor Charles V's life in a series of flashbacks on a split stage, devices which the composer only much later recognized as "cinematic" in style; there is also some use of Sprechstimme.

== History ==
Originally commissioned in 1930 by the Vienna State Opera for performance in 1934, this much anticipated work became a cause célèbre when the production was cancelled after Krenek was blacklisted in Germany by the Nazi government immediately following the German parliamentary elections in March 1933. The composer believed it was its strong emphasis on Christian universality that made Karl V. "utterly intolerable" to the Nazis. A concert suite for soprano (Fragmente aus dem Bühnenwerk Karl V., Op. 73a) was performed in 1936, and the opera was staged for the first time on 22 June 1938 at the Neues Deutsches Theater in Prague, by which time Krenek had fled overseas. In 1954 he revised the score for the first revival in Germany. A fully staged production of the opera was performed in the Festspielhaus of the Bregenzer Festspiele in the summer of 2008, and is available on DVD.

== Roles ==
Roles, voice types, premiere cast
| Role | Voice type | Premiere cast, 22 June 1938 Conductor: Karl Rankl |
|---|---|---|
| Emperor Charles V | baritone | Pavel Ludikar |
| Juana, his mother | contralto | Lydia Kindermann |
| Eleonore, his sister | soprano | Martha Cuno |
| Ferdinand, his brother | tenor | Kurt Baum |
| Isabella, his wife | soprano | |
| Juan de Regla, his confessor | speaking role | |
| Henri Mathys, his physician | | |
| Francisco Borgia, a Jesuit, formerly the Empress' steward | tenor | |
| Alarcon, captain of the Emperor | speaking role | |
| Alba, captain of the Emperor | speaking role | |
| Frundsberg, captain of the Emperor | speaking role | |
| Imperial chancellor | | |
| Francis I, king of France | tenor | |
| Frangipani | tenor | |
| Clement VII | speaking role | |
| A cardinal | speaking role | |
| Luther | baritone | |
| A follower of Luther | tenor | |
| Moritz von Sachsen, a Protestant prince | speaking role | |
| Sultan Soliman | bass | |
| His astrologer | tenor | |

== Recordings ==
Krenek: Karl V. – Radio Symphony Orchestra Vienna

- Conductor: Gerd Albrecht
- Principal singers: Frank Hoffmann, Hanna Schwarz, Helmut Melchert, Horst Hiestermann, Kristine Ciesinski
- Recording date: 14 August 1980
- Label: Philips 6769 084 (2 LPs 106 minutes); later on Orfeo d'Or B00004YLCJ (CD)

Krenek: Karl V. – Bonn Beethovenhalle Orchestra

- Conductor: Marc Soustrot
- Principal singers: Wolf-Dieter Streicher, David Pittman-Jennings, Martina Borst, Tom Sol, Werner Hollweg, Franziska Hirzel, Andreas Conrad, Christoph Bantzer, Anne Gjevang, Axel Medrok, Florian Mock
- Recording date: 14 October 2000
- Label: MD&G Records – B00005NSOB (2 CDs 141 minutes)
