= Alma Moodie =

Australian violinist (1898–1943)

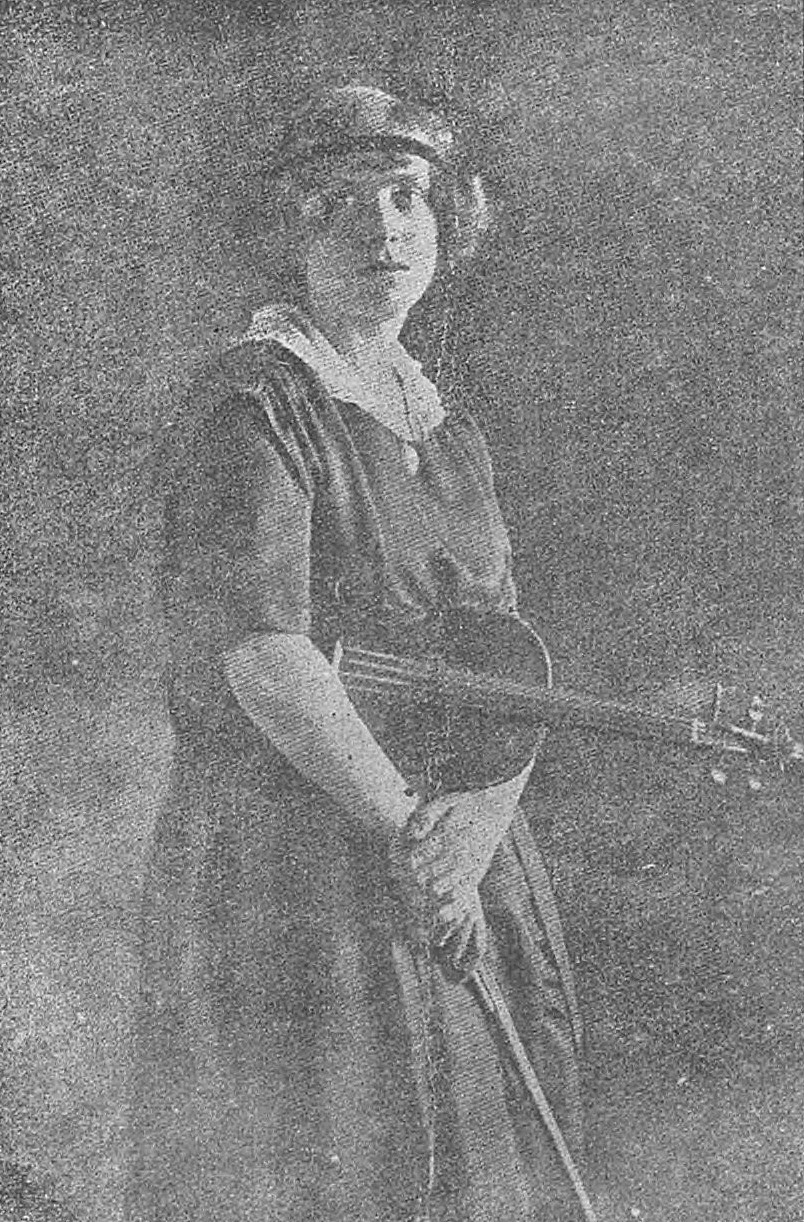
Alma Moodie, c. 1923

Alma Mary Templeton Moodie (12 September 1898 – 7 March 1943) was an Australian violinist who established an excellent reputation in Germany in the 1920s and 1930s. She was regarded as being among the foremost female violinists during the inter-war years, along with such players as Erica Morini, Jelly d'Arányi and Kathleen Parlow; and she premiered violin concertos by Kurt Atterberg, Hans Pfitzner and Ernst Krenek. She and Max Rostal were considered the best pre-war proponents of the Carl Flesch tradition. She became a teacher at the Hoch Conservatory in Frankfurt. However, Alma Moodie made no recordings, and she appears in very few reference sources. Despite her former renown, her name became virtually unknown for many years. She appeared in earlier editions of Grove's and Baker's Dictionaries, but does not appear in the more recent editions.

== Biography ==
Alma Mary Templeton Moodie was born on 12 September 1898 in regional Queensland, Australia, the daughter of William Templeton Moodie and his wife Susan (née McClafferty). Some sources say she was born in Mount Morgan, others in Rockhampton.

She was an only child. Her father, an ironmonger from Ayrshire, Scotland, died on 9 July 1899, when she was less than one year old. Her mother, a music teacher, was the daughter of Irish immigrants.

She studied violin at Mount Morgan, being taught initially by her widowed mother from a very young age, and from the age of 5 by Louis D’Hage in Rockhampton. She appeared in public recitals at age 6 – a performance in Rockhampton in October 1904 was described by a local reporter from The Morning Bulletin, "Her rendering of Renard's 'Berceuse,' accompanied on the piano by Herr Hage, showed the possibility of surprising musical gifts being developed at an extremely young age. The executive ability displayed in this, and an encore piece – 'Canzonetta' (Daube) – was certainly remarkable." In 1905 she passed her violin examinations with distinction achieving the maximum score.

In 1907, aged 9, she gained a scholarship to the Brussels Conservatory, where she studied with Oskar Back for three years, under the general guidance of César Thomson (later, when she had achieved fame, Back and Thomson would both claim to have been her primary teacher). She was accompanied by her mother, who remained with her until her death when Alma was aged 20. In 1913 she was recommended to Max Reger, who, after hearing her play, wrote to his patron Duke George of Sachsen-Meiningen:

Today a 13-year-old girl [she was actually 15 at the time] — English – played for me; hers is the biggest violin talent I have ever encountered. The 13-year-old played Bach solo sonatas for me, sonatas which are the most difficult to play of any in the whole literature of violin music ... I am not ashamed to admit that there were tears in my eyes while this delicate 13-year-old child played for me. Our Lord God has certainly created one of his miracles.

In Meiningen, Eisenach and Hildburghausen Alma Moodie played concertos with Reger conducting, and she appeared in recital with him. Reger also recommended her to other concert organisers. In 1914, he dedicated to her his Präludium und Fuge for solo violin, Op. 131a, No. 4. The Regers had no children, and Max and Alma became like father and daughter for some time. Her mother had planned to return to Australia, leaving Alma in the care of Max and Elsa Reger, but the start of World War I meant she could not leave Europe. The Moodies stayed in Meiningen for the first few months of the war, and then moved to Brussels. Reger died in 1916, without ever seeing Alma again. Times were very hard in Brussels for Alma and her mother. Alma became thin and ill, and claimed she did not touch her violin for four years. Her mother died of consumption or influenza in the spring of 1918.

Alma returned to Germany in October 1918, where she lived in a 12th-century castle in the Harz mountains as ward of Fürst Christian Ernst zu Stolberg und Wernigerode. It is not known how she came to be associated with him. However, it was while here that she met her future husband. She wanted to resume her violin playing, which had badly deteriorated during the war, and made contact with Carl Flesch in November 1919, who agreed to accept her as a pupil. She continued having lessons with Flesch throughout her travelling career and after the birth of her son. Flesch had a special fondness for Alma Moodie (he wrote 'amongst all the pupils in my course I liked Alma Moodie best').

She made Germany her home, and never returned to Australia. In Berlin on 6 November 1919, with the Berlin Philharmonic Orchestra under Max von Schillings, she premiered the Violin Concerto in E minor, Op. 7 of Kurt Atterberg. In the 1922–23 season, she played ninety concerts, seventy of them in seven months, in a tour that took her to Switzerland, Italy, Paris, Berlin, and 'the Orient'.

From 1922 (or earlier), the Swiss businessman Werner Reinhart became a driving force in her career and she became a regular visitor to his homes in Winterthur and other places, where she came into contact with most of the prominent names in the contemporary music scene of the day. It was Reinhart who gave her a Guarnerius violin that had previously been owned by Fritz Kreisler. Through Reinhart, in 1923 she met the poet Rainer Maria Rilke, who was greatly impressed with her playing. He wrote in a letter: "What a sound, what richness, what determination. That and the "Sonnets to Orpheus", those were two strings of the same voice. And she plays mostly Bach! Muzot has received its musical christening...." And it was through Reinhart that she attended and performed at many of the International Society for Contemporary Music (ISCM)'s festivals.

She championed the music of Hans Pfitzner and he dedicated his Violin Concerto in B minor, Op. 34 (1923) to her. She premiered it in Nuremberg, on 4 June 1924, with the composer conducting. Moodie became its leading exponent, and performed it over 50 times in Germany with conductors such as Pfitzner, Wilhelm Furtwängler, Hans Knappertsbusch, Hermann Scherchen, Karl Muck, Carl Schuricht, and Fritz Busch. At that time, the Pfitzner concerto was considered the most important addition to the violin concerto repertoire since the first concerto of Max Bruch, although it has slipped from the repertoire of most violinists these days.

Between 1921 and her death in 1943, Alma Moodie often appeared with the Latvian pianist and composer Eduard Erdmann, for example in Pfitzner's Violin Sonata, which was dedicated to Moodie. Erdmann's own Sonata for Solo Violin, Op. 12 (1921) was dedicated to her, and she premiered it in Berlin in October 1921. The Australian-English critic Walter J. Turner wrote of a recital he heard them play in London in April 1934, 'it was the best violin piano duo that I have ever heard'. Their last concert together was given on 4 March 1943, three days before her death, when they were in the middle of the cycle of Beethoven sonatas.

Ernst Krenek married Anna Mahler (the daughter of Gustav Mahler) in March 1924, when Krenek was completing his Violin Concerto No. 1, Op. 29. Alma Moodie assisted Krenek, not with the scoring of the violin part, but with getting financial assistance from Werner Reinhart at a time when there was hyper-inflation in Germany. In gratitude, Krenek dedicated the concerto to Moodie, and she premiered it on 5 January 1925, in Dessau. In the meantime, Krenek's marriage to Anna Mahler had collapsed, and their divorce became final a few days after the premiere. Krenek did not attend the premiere, but he did have an affair with Moodie which has been described as "short-lived and complicated". He never managed to hear her play the concerto, but he did "immortalize some aspects of her personality in the character of Anita in his opera Jonny spielt auf". Krenek also dedicated his Sonata for Solo Violin, Op. 33 to Alma Moodie in 1924.

Igor Stravinsky arranged a suite of excerpts from Pulcinella for violin and piano, calling it "Suite from themes, fragments and pieces by Pergolesi". Alma Moodie premiered it with the composer in Frankfurt on 25 November 1925, and they played it on a number of other public occasions. They also played it at Werner Reinhart's home in Winterthur. Stravinsky described her as "excellent". He may also have intended a pair of arrangements from The Firebird with Moodie in mind.

Arthur Nikisch wrote of her to Carl Flesch from Leipzig in December 1925: "For me, this girl is a phenomenon artistically so delightful that I regard it as my natural duty to promote the interests of this blessed creature as much as I am able". Leopold Auer also heard her and held her in very high regard.

Alma Moodie was considered one of the most important interpreters of Brahms's works for violin. Hermann Reutter quotes her as saying "One must be at least forty to understand the greatness and depth of expression in Brahms' music." Reutter participated in many concerts with Alma Moodie, and dedicated his Rhapsodie for violin and piano, Op. 51 (1939), to her.

On 18 December 1927, she married Alexander Balthasar Alfred Spengler, a German lawyer, becoming the third of his six wives, and they had two children. They initially lived in Cologne. He was indifferent to her career, and she was tired from incessant travelling, so she performed less often after that. She taught violin at the Hoch Conservatory in Frankfurt, where she continued Carl Flesch's teaching tradition. Her students included Günter Kehr, Maria Thomán (daughter of István Thomán), Lea Luboshutz, May Harrison, Irma Seyde and Thelma Given.

Spengler was often travelling abroad; when he was home, he was demanding and unfaithful. Alma took to drinking and smoking, and found that she needed sleeping pills; later, her bow arm started to tremble uncontrollably, leading to more drinking and more sleeping pills.

Alma Moodie died on 7 March 1943, aged 44, during an air raid on Frankfurt, although the bombs were not the cause of her death. A doctor reported that she died accidentally of a thrombosis brought on by the mixture of alcohol and pills she had taken, but a number of her close friends believed her death to be suicide. Her obituary by the critic Karl Holl concluded: "Her violin playing has been silenced. But it leaves behind a ring of rare purity. Her name will always remain as that of a feminine personality in the history of music".

== Concerto performances ==
In addition to the performances mentioned above, Alma Moodie's appearances included:

- Bach Double Violin Concerto in D minor
  - with Georg Kulenkampff and the Berlin Philharmonic Orchestra (BPO) (15 December 1927)
  - with Riele Queling and the BPO under Wilhelm Furtwängler (Berlin, December 1933)
- Bach Concerto in E major
  - at the Musikkollegium (Winterthur, 25 October 1922)
  - with Furtwängler (Hamburg, 1933)
- Brahms Concerto in D major:
  - with the Meininger Hofkapelle under Max Reger (Eisenach, 6 December 1913; Hildburghausen, 7 December; Meiningen, 9 December; at these concerts she also played Reger's Suite im alten Stil, Op. 93, with the composer at the piano)
  - under Volkmar Andreae (Zürich, November 1921)
  - with the London Symphony Orchestra under Bruno Walter (London)
- Busoni concerto (London, 1934) (this is possibly the same occasion as her appearance in London on 12 April 1934 with the London Philharmonic Orchestra under Sir Thomas Beecham)
- Dvořák Concerto in A minor (Duisburg, October 1921; Carl Flesch made a detour in his own touring schedule just to hear her)
- Glazunov Concerto in A minor with Furtwängler (Vienna, November 1921)
- Lalo Symphonie espagnole, BPO (Berlin, 12 December 1919)
- Mendelssohn Concerto in E minor with Furtwängler (Leipzig, 1923)
- Mozart "D major concerto" (this could refer to either No. 2 or No. 4) under Peter Hagel, BPO (Berlin, 12 December 1919)
- Paganini D major concerto under Max von Schillings, BPO (Berlin, 6 November 1919)
- Pfitzner Concerto in B minor (Berlin and Leipzig 1924; her 50th performance was in Flensburg, March 1929; Gewandhaus, Leipzig, January 1935)
- Max von Schillings's Violin Concerto, Op. 25, composer conducting BPO (Berlin, 12 December 1919)

== Posthumous recognition ==
In 1943, Karl Höller wrote his Violin Sonata No. 2 in G minor, Op. 33 in memory of Alma Moodie.

Australian composer David Osborne wrote a violin concerto titled Pictures of Alma, which was premiered on 30 May 2010 by Rochelle Bryson and the Raga Dolls Salon Orchestra, at the Iwaki Auditorium, ABC Southbank Centre, Melbourne.

Osborne explained in a pre-performance interview broadcast on ABC Classic FM that the work sought to depict Alma Moodie in music at various stages of her life. He named it Pictures of Alma as he understood there were no surviving pictures of her, but since learned there are some.
