= René Morax =

Swiss thespian and founder of the Théâtre du Jorat

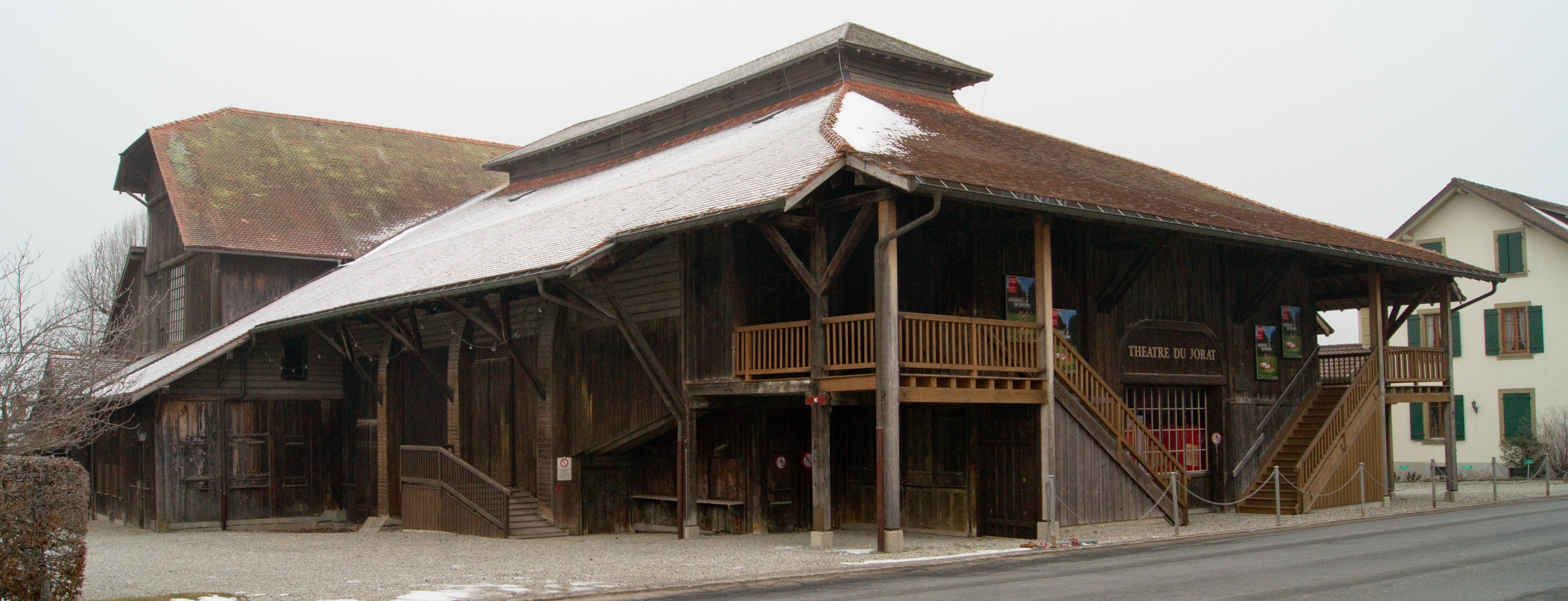
- The Théâtre du Jorat, which he founded and directed, presenting his plays
- Born: 11 May 1873; Morges, Switzerland
- Died: 3 January 1963 (aged 89); Morges
- Occupations: Writer; Playwright; Stage director; Theatre manager
- Organization: Théâtre du Jorat
- Works: Le Roi David
- Awards: Dramenpreis

René Morax (11 May 1873 – 3 January 1963) was a Swiss writer, playwright, stage director and theatre manager. He founded the Théâtre du Jorat in Morges in 1908, and promoted historical and rural theatre in French in Switzerland. He is known for the play Le Roi David, with music by Arthur Honegger.

== Early life and career ==
Born in Morges, Canton de Vaud, on 11 May 1873, Morax studied literature in Lausanne, Paris and Berlin. His first play, La Nuit des quatre-temps (1901) was given at the casino in Morges. This show gave a new direction to the culture in Switzerland. Indeed, following the example of what was done in France, this was the first expression of a true form of popular theater.

In 1903, he premiered La Dîme at Mézières. This drama, based on a historical fact, well known in the region, tells the story of Pastor Martin who in 1790 was thrown into prison because he disputed the fact that the peasants must pay a direct tax on potatoes. La Dîme was a tremendous success and received international attention. The improvised stage for the performances was made permanent, and thus he created in 1908 the Théâtre du Jorat, together with his brother Jean. It was soon nicknamed the "Sublime Barn" (La Grange sublime).

A notable inspiration of the Jorat theater, René Morax wrote, staged and played rural and historical dramas in French. In 1910, he premiered Aliéno, written in collaboration with Gustave Doret, then in 1921 the oratorio Le Roi David with a then unknown composer, Arthur Honegger. The text, based on biblical narration, tells the story of King David from his time as a shepherd boy to his death. Morax wrote the text for a 1928 cantata by Conrad Beck, Der Tod des Oedipus.

René Morax was also the author of little comedies and farces (including Les Quatre Doigts et le Pouce in 1915, revived by the Théâtre des Faux-Nez in 1955), and of translations and adaptations which made him one of the most productive contemporary theater dramatists in Switzerland.

=== Theatre work ===
- 1902: Les quatre doigts et le pouce.
- 1903: La Dime, music by Alexandre Dénéréaz
- 1908: Henriette.
- 1910: Aliénor, music by Gustave Doret
- 1911: Orphée.
- 1912: La nuit des Quatre Temps.
- 1914: Tell.
- 1921: Le Roi David, biblical drama, music by Arthur Honegger.
- 1923: Davel.
- 1925: Judith.
- 1929 Roméo et Juliette (translation after Shakespeare).
- 1931: La belle de Moudon.
- 1933: La terre et l’eau.
- 1937: La Servante d’Évolène, music by Gustave Doret
- 1944: Charles le téméraire.
- 1947 La lampe d’argile.

== Later life and death ==
Morax was awarded the Dramenpreis (drama prize) of the foundation Welti-Stiftung in 1942. A bust in his honour was inaugurated in Morges on 17 June 1962 in his presence. He died in the hospital of his hometown on 3 January 1963.

== Sources ==
- René Morax on theaterwissenschaft.ch
- Fonds : René Morax (1901–1968) [0,70 mètres linéaires]. Cote: CH-000053-1 P Morax. Archives cantonales vaudoises read online
- This article incorporates public domain material from websites or documents of the United States Department of Homeland Security..
- A contre temps huitante textes vaudois de 1980 à 1380, (pp. 160–165), ISBN 2601000023
- P.-Ol. Walzer Dictionnaire des littératures suisses, (p. 409), ISBN 2-88108-077-4
- H.-Ch.Dahlem Sur les pas d'un lecteur heureux, (p. 423), ISBN 2-88108-024-3
- R. Francillon Histoire de la littérature en Suisse romande, vol. 2, (pp. 323–326), (pp. 334–336), ISBN 978-2-88182-943-7
- A. Nicollier, H.-Ch. Dahlem Dictionnaire des écrivains suisses d'expression française, vol. 2, (pp. 605–606), ISBN 2881150128
- Dessin photographie d'une coupe du théâtre de René Morax, à Mézières, photographie Arthur Buttel, Ferlens Patrie suisse, (René Morax) 1908, No 379, (pp. 83–84)
- Photo Thibault, Morges Patrie suisse, (E. de B.), 1902, No 216, (pp. 5–8)
- Pierre Meylan: René Morax et son temps.
