= Théâtre du Jorat =

Theatre building in Mézières in the canton of Vaud, Switzerland

Coordinates: 46.5980°N 6.7716°E

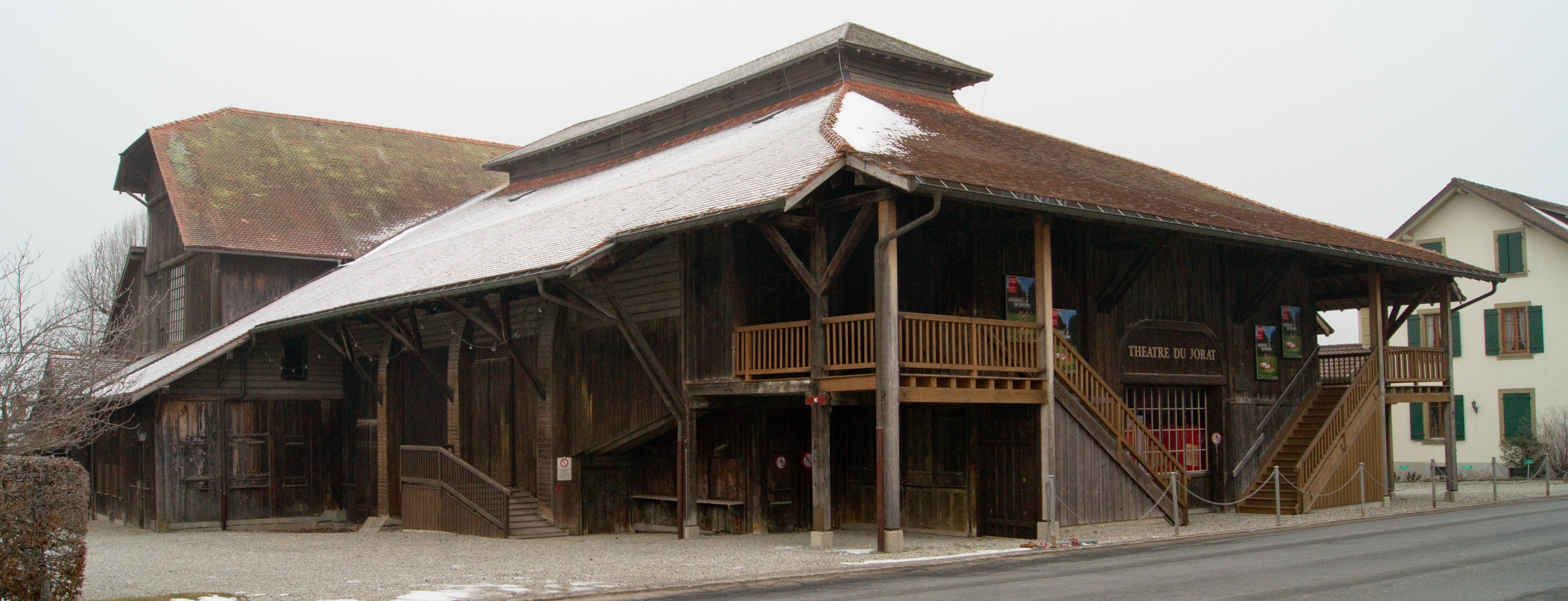
Overall view of the theater

The Théâtre du Jorat, inaugurated 9 May 1908, is a theater hall located in the Vaud commune of Mézières, Switzerland, about 20 km from Lausanne, in the Jorat region.

== Description ==
The Théâtre du Jorat was established by René Morax in 1908. Werner Reinhart was the primary financial supporter of the Théâtre du Jorat. Constructed entirely of wood which ensures its integration with neighboring farms, it is nicknamed the "Sublime barn" or the "Wooden palace" by the inhabitants of the commune. The building is listed in the Swiss Inventory of Cultural Property of National and Regional Significance.

The venue offers more than 1000 seats. In particular, it was the place where Le Roi David by Arthur Honegger and many works by Gustave Doret were premiered.

Hugues Cuénod made his last stage appearance at the theatre in 1994, performing as M Triquet in Eugene Onegin.
