= Pierre-Louis Matthey =

Swiss writer

- Born: 19 July 1893; Signy-Avenex
- Died: 5 March 1970 (aged 76); Geneva
- Occupation: Writer

Pierre-Louis Matthey (19 July 1893 – 5 March 1970) was a Swiss writer and poet.

== Works ==
Matthey is considered one of the most important Swiss-French poets. His themes explore the passions and despair of adolescence, mythology and the absolute powers of art, describing a poetic journey from youth to maturity. His poems are daring in form, revealing a complex, hermetic and constantly reworked language.
