= Ernst Krenek =

Austrian/American composer (1900–1991)

- Ernst Krenek (left) with Hans Heinsheimer (right) in Rolling Hills, CA, 1969
- Born: Ernst Heinrich Křenek; 23 August 1900; Vienna, Austria-Hungary
- Died: 22 December 1991 (aged 91); Palm Springs, California, U.S.

Ernst Heinrich Krenek (23 August 1900 – 22 December 1991) was an Austrian-born later American based multi-award winning composer.

He explored atonality and other modern styles and published a number of books, including Music Here and Now (1939), a study of Johannes Ockeghem (1953), and Horizons Circled: Reflections on my Music (1974). Krenek wrote two pieces using the pseudonym Thornton Winsloe.

== Life ==
Born Ernst Heinrich Křenek (Note: He changed the spelling of his name to Krenek after he moved to the US) in Vienna (then in Austria-Hungary), he was the son of a Czech soldier who served in the Austro-Hungarian army.

He studied there and in Berlin with Franz Schreker before working in a number of German opera houses as conductor. During World War I, Krenek was drafted into the Austrian army, but he was stationed in Vienna, allowing him to go on with his musical studies. In 1922 he met Alma Mahler, widow of Gustav Mahler, and her daughter, Anna, to whom he dedicated his Symphony No. 2, and whom he married in January 1924. That marriage ended in divorce before its first anniversary.

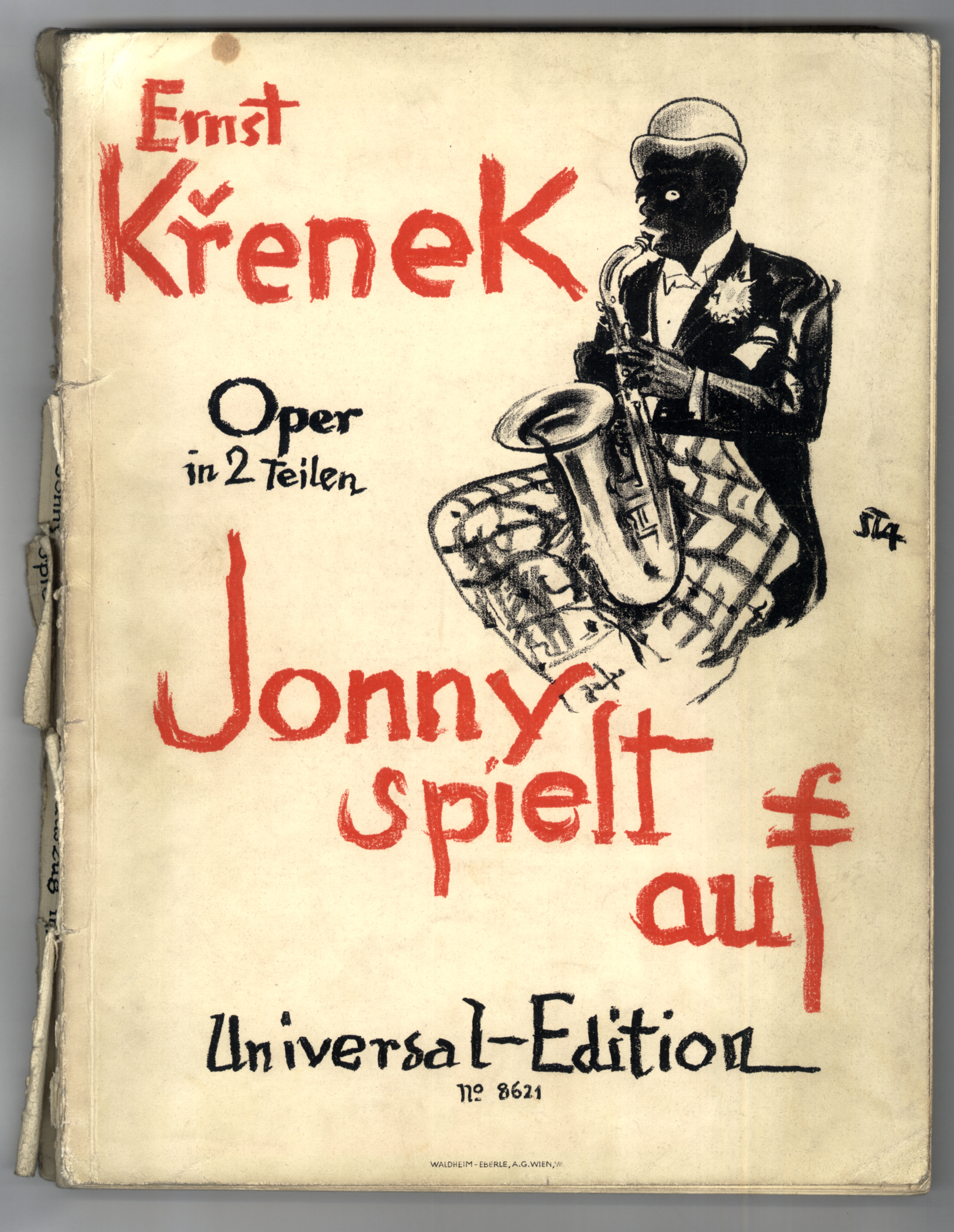
Jonny spielt auf, the title page of the 1926 vocal score (1st edition)

At the time of his marriage to Anna Mahler, Krenek was completing his Violin Concerto No. 1, Op. 29. The Australian violinist Alma Moodie assisted Krenek, not with the scoring of the violin part, but with obtaining financial assistance from her Swiss patron Werner Reinhart at a time when there was hyper-inflation in Germany. In gratitude, Krenek dedicated the concerto to Moodie, and she premiered it on January 5, 1925, in Dessau. Krenek's divorce from Anna Mahler became final a few days after the premiere. Krenek did not attend the premiere, but he did have an affair with Moodie, which has been described as "short-lived and complicated". He never managed to hear her play the concerto, but he did "immortalize some aspects of her personality in the character of Anita in his opera Jonny spielt auf". This 'jazz opera', completed in 1926, was an enormous success across Europe and made Krenek a household name for several years; there is even a brand of cigarettes, still on the market today in Austria, named "Jonny". Krenek himself became uncomfortable with this success though, as his musical colleagues criticised the commercialisation of his music, and shortly afterwards changed his compositional direction radically.

The jazz-influenced score of Jonny spielt auf and its central character of a black jazz musician (who is also seen womanising and stealing a priceless violin) brought Krenek the opprobrium of the nascent Nazi Party; the image of Jonny was distorted to form the centrepiece of the poster advertising the Entartete Musik exhibition of so-called 'degenerate' music in 1938. Krenek was frequently named as a Jewish composer during the Third Reich, although he was not, and was intimidated by the regime until his emigration; on March 6, 1933, one day after the last semi-free election of March 1933, Krenek's incidental music to Goethe's Triumph der Empfindsamkeit was withdrawn in Mannheim, and eventually pressure was brought to bear on the Vienna State Opera, which cancelled the commissioned premiere of Karl V.

In 1938 Krenek moved to the United States, where he taught music at various universities, the first being Vassar College. He later taught at Hamline University in Saint Paul, Minnesota from 1942 to 1947. There he met and married his third wife, the composer Gladys Nordenstrom, who was his student at the time. He became an American citizen in 1945. He later moved to Toronto, Ontario, Canada, where he taught at The Royal Conservatory of Music during the 1950s. His students included Milton Barnes, Lorne Betts, Roque Cordero, Samuel Dolin, Robert Erickson, Halim El-Dabh, Richard Maxfield, Will Ogdon, George Perle, Virginia Seay, and Hsiung-Zee Wong. Later he moved to Tujunga, before moving to Palm Springs, California in 1966. He died there in 1991, aged 91, but was buried at the Vienna Central Cemetery. In 1998 Gladys Nordenstrom founded the Ernst Krenek Institute; in 2004 the private foundation moved from Vienna to Krems an der Donau, Austria.

== Completions of other composers' unfinished works ==
After meeting Krenek in 1922, Alma Mahler asked him to complete her late husband's Symphony No. 10. Krenek assisted in editing the first and third movements but went no further. More fruitful was Krenek's response to an approximately contemporary request from his pianist and composer friend Eduard Erdmann, who wished to add Schubert's Reliquie piano sonata to his repertoire, for completions of that work's fragmentary third and fourth movements. Krenek's completion, dated to 1921 in some sources but to 1922 in his own memory, later found other champions in Webster Aitken in the concert hall and Ray Lev; Friedrich Wührer; and, more recently, Stanislav Khristenko on records.

In his notes to the Lev recording, dated July 1947, Krenek offered insights into the challenges of completing another composer's works in general and the Schubert sonata in particular.

Completing the unfinished work of a great master is a very delicate task. In my opinion it can honestly be undertaken only if the original fragment contains all of the main ideas of the unfinished work. In such a case a respectful craftsman may attempt, after an absorbing study of the master's style, to elaborate on those ideas in a way which to the best of his knowledge might have been the way of the master himself. The work in question will probably have analogies among other, completed works of the master, and careful investigation of his methods in similar situations will indicate possible solutions of the problems posed by the unfinished work. Even then the artist who goes about the ticklish task will feel slightly uneasy, knowing from his own experience as a composer that the creative mind does not always follow its own precedents. He is more conscious of the fact that unpredictability is one of the most jealously guarded prerogatives of genius. ... However, scruples of this kind may be set aside once we are certain that the author of the fragment has put forth the essential thematic material that was expected to go into the work. If this is not the case, I feel that no one, not even the greatest genius, should dare to complete the fragments left by another genius.

== Musical style ==
Krenek's music encompassed a variety of styles and reflects many of the principal musical influences of the 20th century. His early work is in a late-Romantic idiom, showing the influence of his teacher Franz Schreker, but around 1920 he turned to atonality, under the influence of Ernst Kurth's textbook, Grundlagen des linearen Kontrapunkts, and the tenets of Busoni, Schnabel, Erdmann, and Scherchen, amongst others.

A visit to Paris, during which he became familiar with the work of Igor Stravinsky (Pulcinella was especially influential) and Les Six, led him to adopt a neo-classical style around 1924. Shortly afterward, he turned to neoromanticism and incorporated jazz influences into his opera Jonny spielt auf (Jonny Strikes Up, 1926) and one-act opera Schwergewicht (1928). Other neoromantic works of this period were modeled on music of Franz Schubert, a prime example being Reisebuch aus den österreichischen Alpen (1929).

Krenek abandoned the neoromantic style in the late 1920s to embrace Arnold Schoenberg's twelve-tone technique, the method exclusively employed in Krenek's opera Karl V (1931–33) and most of his later pieces. His most uncompromising use of the twelve-tone technique was in his Sixth String Quartet (1936) and his Piano Variations (1937). In the Lamentatio Jeremiae prophetae (1941–42) Krenek combined twelve-tone writing with techniques of modal counterpoint of the Renaissance. He used motifs composed by his student Virginia Seay in his works Hurricane Variations for Piano, opus 100 (1944) and Tricks and Trifles (1945), also for piano.

In 1955 he was invited to work in the Electronic Music Studio at WDR in Cologne, and this experience motivated him to develop a total serial idiom. Beginning around 1960 he added to his serial vocabulary some principles of aleatoric music, in works such as Horizon Circled (1967), From Three Make Seven (1960–61), and Fibonacci-Mobile (1964).

In his later years his compositional style became more relaxed, though he continued to use elements of both twelve-tone and total serial techniques.

== Decorations and awards ==
- 1951: Order of Merit of the Federal Republic of Germany
- 1955: City of Vienna Prize for Music
- 1960: Grand Decoration of Honour in Silver (Grosses Silbernes Ehrenzeichen)
- 1960: Gold Medal of the City of Vienna
- 1963: Grand Austrian State Prize for Music
- 1965: Commander's Cross of the Order of Merit of the Federal Republic of Germany (Großes Verdienstkreuz der Bundesrepublik Deutschland)
- 1966: Bach Prize of the Free and Hanseatic City of Hamburg
- 1970: Honorary Ring of the Vienna
- 1975: Austrian Decoration for Science and Art
- 1978: Goethe-Plakette des Landes Hessen
- 1980: Honorary Citizen of the City of Vienna
- 1984: Honorary Citizen of the City of New Orleans
- 1990: Grand Decoration of Salzburg

On Krenek's 85th birthday, the City of Vienna donated the Ernst Krenek Prize.

=== Honorary doctorates ===
- 1944: Hamline University, St. Paul
- 1953: Chapman College, Los Angeles
- 1965: University of New Mexico, Albuquerque
- 1976: New England Conservatory, Boston
- 1977: Philadelphia Musical Academy, Philadelphia

== See also ==
- List of Austrians in music
