= Ernest Ansermet =

Swiss conductor (1883–1969)

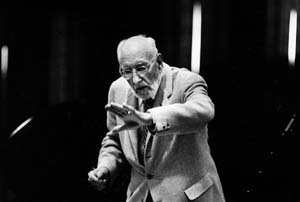
Ansermet in 1965

Ernest Alexandre Ansermet (French: [ɛʁnɛst alɛksɑ̃dʁ ɑ̃sɛʁmɛ]; 11 November 1883 – 20 February 1969) was a Swiss conductor.

Ansermet was born into a musical family, but he followed his father into mathematics and taught at the University of Lausanne before deciding in 1909 to make music his career. He took lessons in harmony and counterpoint and spent a year in Berlin, where he sought advice from Arthur Nikisch and Felix Weingartner and attended the rehearsals of the Berlin Philharmonic by Nikisch, Richard Strauss and others. In 1910 he was introduced to Claude Debussy in Paris and to Maurice Ravel and Igor Stravinsky in Montreux, where Ansermet had recently been appointed resident conductor. He became a noted interpreter of their works.

In 1915, on Stravinsky's recommendation, he became conductor for Sergei Diaghilev's Ballets Russes. He conducted the premieres of Stravinsky's Pulcinella and Le Rossignol, Manuel de Falla's The Three-Cornered Hat, Prokofiev 's Chout and Respighi's La Boutique fantasque, and the revival of The Rite of Spring.

In 1918 Ansermet founded the Orchestre de la Suisse Romande, based in Geneva. He remained its conductor for fifty years, touring and making numerous recordings. He was in great demand in North America, Russia and Continental Europe and continually added important new works to his repertoire. From 1916 to 1968 he was active in the recording studios. After the Second World War, his international reputation rested to a considerable degree on his long-term recording contract with Decca Records, for whom he recorded most of his extensive repertoire. His interpretations were known for clarity of timbre and texture and scholarly concern for accuracy. He was considered by some to be too intellectual as a conductor, but his mastery of orchestral balance was not questioned. He was seen as a perceptive exponent of the classics but mainly as a leading advocate for the music of his contemporaries – Debussy, Ravel and Stravinsky.

On 20 February 1969 Ansermet died at his home in Geneva, at the age of 85.

== Life and career ==
=== Early years ===
Ansermet was born on 11 November 1883 in Vevey, District de la Riviera-Pays-d'Enhaut, Vaud, Switzerland. Both his parents were teachers: his father was a mathematician, specialising in geometry. It was a musical family and Ansermet was immersed in music from childhood. His father sang, his mother played the piano. His great-grandfather was head of the military band in Morges, and, Ansermet recalled, had seven sons, each of whom played a woodwind and a string instrument. The young Ansermet learned the clarinet, the piano and the violin.

Ansermet was educated first at the Vevey grammar school, and then at the science secondary school in Lausanne, before taking a degree in mathematical and physical sciences from the faculty of science of the University of Lausanne in 1903. During his student years he was band-leader of the cadets at the grammar school and conductor of the string-orchestra at the secondary school. At Vevey he became familiar with the playing of the brass instruments.

Between 1903 and 1905 he taught mathematics in Lausanne, at the college of higher education, at the science secondary school, and at the school of commerce, where he lectured on currency. He left for Paris in 1905, intending to prepare a thesis for a doctorate in mathematics there. While attending classes at the Sorbonne, he went twice a week to the Paris Conservatoire to study with André Gedalge (for fugue) and Bourgault-Ducoudray (for history of music). In addition, he listened to numerous lectures and conferences. Realising very quickly the inadequacy of his mathematic preparation, he gave up his thesis. Returning to Lausanne he resumed teaching and married a fellow teacher, Marguerite Jaccottet. They had one child, Anne-Jacqueline.

=== Music ===
In 1909 Ansermet gave up teaching to make his career in music. In addition to his youthful training in clarinet, piano and violin he took lessons in harmony and counterpoint with Alexandre Dénéréaz and others. He spent a year in Berlin, where he sought advice from Arthur Nikisch and Felix Weingartner, and attended the rehearsals of Nikisch, Richard Strauss, Felix Mottl, Karl Muck and other great conductors at the Philharmonie. At seventeen he published his first piece of music, Sourire d'Avril, without having had any lessons in composition. He later studied composition in Geneva with Ernest Bloch and Otto Barblan.

In 1910, Robert Godet, a friend of Bloch, introduced Ansermet to Claude Debussy in Paris. In the same year he was appointed conductor of the Kursaal concerts in Montreux, where he met Henri Duparc, Maurice Ravel and Igor Stravinsky. Duparc, who lived in La Tour-de-Peilz had an incurable neurasthenia and was also almost blind. Under his direction, Ansermet wrote the orchestration of Duparc's most famous melodies: "Phydilé", "La Vie ancienne", and "L'Invitation au Voyage".

After three years there he moved to Geneva to direct a concert series, succeeding Bernhard Stavenhagen, In January 1915 Ansermet conducted his first concert in that city. The programme was representative of his preferred repertoire then and thereafter: two works by Rimsky-Korsakov, Borodin's "Polovtsian Dances" and the suite from Stravinsky's Petrushka, which was being performed for the first time in Switzerland. The concert was a considerable success. One press notice said that Ansermet proved to be a conductor of the highest order, making the orchestra play precisely, with excellent rhythm:

and alongside this clarity the conductor gives of himself unstintingly, sweeping his musicians along with the infectious warmth, energy and verve of his conducting. We have rarely heard the orchestra so firmly in hand, or bringing such colour and vividness to its interpretations.

In 1915 Ansermet became conductor of the Geneva Symphony Orchestra. In the same year, on Stravinsky's recommendation, he became conductor for Sergei Diaghilev's Ballets Russes, with whom he made his North American début in New York in 1916, his South American début in 1917, and his London début in 1919. He conducted the premieres of Stravinsky's Pulcinella and Le Rossignol, Manuel de Falla's The Three-Cornered Hat, Prokofiev 's Chout and Respighi's La Boutique fantasque, and the revival of The Rite of Spring. He also directed Apollon musagète, Les Noces, Parade, Histoire du soldat, Pulcinella and Renard.

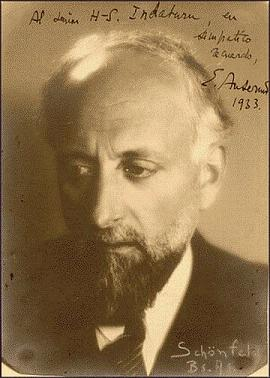
Photo circa 1920s, signed 1933

In an interview he gave an American newspaper in January 1916, Ansermet blamed Richard Wagner and Richard Strauss for the First World War. He averred that Wagner's introduction of "tumultuous music, with the blare of trumpets infused a warlike spirit into the German nation" and that Strauss "followed this flamboyant martial spirit to the breaking point". (Note: In the more than 300 recordings Ansermet conducted for Decca Records there are none of Strauss's music and only four excerpts from Wagner operas: the funeral march from Götterdämmerung, and the preludes to Lohengrin, Die Meistersinger and Parsifal with the Good Friday music from the last.)

=== Orchestre de la Suisse Romande ===
In 1918 Ansermet founded his own orchestra, the Orchestre de la Suisse Romande (OSR). He recalled:

It was because in this country we had, at the end of the First World War, no major orchestra. … I realised that we could have an orchestra only with the agreement of the French-speaking Swiss, that is what we call Suisse Romande. And so we decided to form a special symphony orchestra only for concerts. We were helped by sponsors. Rich people would give their money. In forming the orchestra I took the woodwind players principally from France, the brass players principally from Vienna, the string players from Belgium and Italy. We did not have sufficient Swiss players at that time.

From 1925 onwards Ansermet was in great demand in North America, Russia and Continental Europe. He continually added important new works to his repertoire, including Honegger's Pacific 231, Stravinsky's Capriccio, Symphonies for Wind Instruments and Symphony of Psalms. One of the great benefactors of French music in the 1920s was the Princesse de Polignac, who commissioned works from, among many others, Saint-Saëns, Fauré, and Poulenc. Together with her friend the fashion designer Coco Chanel she wielded considerable influence in Parisian artistic and financial circles. In 1928 they organised the funding for a new symphony orchestra in the French capital – the Orchestre Symphonique de Paris (OSP). A triumvirate of musicians active in Paris – the pianist Alfred Cortot and the conductors Louis Fourestier and Ansermet – were invited to run it, but in 1929 Pierre Monteux was appointed over Ansermet's head as the OSP's artistic director and principal conductor. Ansermet was effectively removed from the orchestra's affairs, although he conducted the occasional concert.

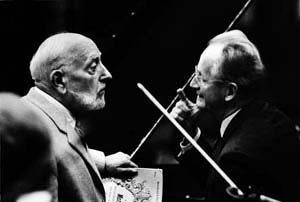
Ansermet and Wilhelm Kempff (1965)

Widowed in 1940, Ansermet was married again in 1942, to Juliette Salvisberg. As a citizen of neutral Switzerland, Ansermet was freer than most to move between countries during the Second World War and conducted in Germany and in occupied Paris, which tarnished his reputation among many musicians.

After the war, Ansermet's international reputation rested to a considerable extent on his long-term recording contract with the Decca Record Company. In June 1945 Decca announced its ffrr (full frequency range recording) system. The dramatically enhanced frequency range now possible put Decca ahead of its competitors technically and prompted the company to move its main London recording venue from its West Hampstead studios to the acoustically superb Kingsway Hall in 1944. Ansermet conducted what the music historian Robert Dearling calls "the first important ffrr release", Stravinsky's complete score for Petrushka, recorded there in February 1946.

Ansermet's concentration on the OSR did not prevent him from occasional returns to his old occupation of conducting for the ballet. He was in the pit for Sadler's Wells Ballet at the Edinburgh Festival in 1954 for The Firebird, La Boutique fantasque and The Three Cornered Hat. He conducted the company in the three works at Covent Garden shortly afterwards. The Times commented on the conductor's longevity: "In what year of the twentieth century are we now living? … Have we arrived at 1924? Is that not M. Ernest Ansermet at the desk? But the Can-can dancer is not Lydia Lopokova but Nadia Nerina, the Firebird is not Alexandra Danilova but Margot Fonteyn, and the Miller is not Leonide Massine but Alexander Grant". In concerts overseas Ansermet liked to include music by his compatriots Arthur Honegger and Frank Martin, as in a 1959 concert in London in which he conducted the BBC Symphony Orchestra in Mozart, Honegger, Martin, Debussy and Chabrier. (Note: Respectively the "Jupiter" Symphony, Une Cantate de Noël, Etudes for String Orchestra, Jeux, and the Joyeuse Marche)

Ansermet was a commander of the Legion d'honneur, honorary doctor of the universities of Neuchatel and Lausanne, and he held the freedom of the cities of Geneva and Vevey. In his later years he conducted the orchestra on tour in the US and Japan.

On 20 February 1969 Ansermet died at his home in Geneva, at the age of 85.

== Modernism ==
Ragtime had prompted Debussy's "Golliwog's Cakewalk" and Stravinsky's Ragtime for Eleven instruments, but when ragtime evolved into jazz Ansermet was one of the first in the field of classical music to take it seriously. In 1919 he wrote an article praising Sidney Bechet. He wrote that Bechet "is content that what he does gives pleasure, but who knows nothing more to say about his art than that he 'goes his own way'." That "own way", Ansermet concluded, is "perhaps the mainstream along which the whole world will be swept tomorrow". But although known for performing much modern music by composers such as Honegger and Martin, Ansermet avoided the music of Arnold Schoenberg and his associates. He told The Times in 1963,

I have conducted some early Schoenberg, like the Chamber Symphony, but I don't feel any real affinity with his outlook. Verklärte Nacht, to me, seems in doubtful taste. But with Berg I feel more sympathy; he and I were friends, and I have given performances of several of his works, including the Lulu symphonic excerpts and the Violin Concerto – the only serial music I've conducted.

He criticised Stravinsky for introducing Schoenbergian twelve-tone techniques in his later compositions. In his book, Les fondements de la musique dans la conscience humaine (1961), Ansermet maintained that Schoenberg's idiom was false and irrational. He labelled it a "Jewish idea" and went on to say that "the historic creation of Western music" would have developed just as well "without the Jew". His reputation suffered because of his collaboration with the Nazis and he was boycotted in the new state of Israel.

== Reputation ==
In Grove's Dictionary of Music and Musicians, Noël Goodwin writes of Ansermet performances "distinguished by his instinct for clarity of timbre and texture, and a scholar’s concern for accuracy". Ansermet said that his mathematical outlook had helped him to achieve clarity of thought and to avoid the nebulous, but denied that being a mathematician helped him with the complicated 5/16 and 7/16 bars in The Rite of Spring: "it has nothing to do with it, of course – one doesn't count, one feels the rhythm.

Goodwin rates him as a perceptive exponent of the classics but an even more persuasive advocate for the music of his contemporaries – Debussy, Ravel, Stravinsky and Roussel, and comments that he championed his fellow Swiss composers, Honegger and Frank Martin. Ansermet conducted the premieres of Britten's The Rape of Lucretia at Glyndebourne (1946) and the Cantata misericordium at Geneva (1963), and of works by Bloch, Copland, Lutosławski, Martinů and Walton, among others.

== Recordings ==
Labels for two of Ansermet's recordings from the 1920s

Ansermet's career as a recording artist lasted for more than fifty years, and he recorded almost his entire repertoire – 296 works by some 63 different composers. He made his first records in New York in 1916 with the orchestra of the Ballets Russes. They included Rimsky-Korsakov's Sheherezade, recorded for Columbia in 1916 – the first of his four recordings of the piece. His final recording was The Firebird – his third version of the complete ballet – made for Decca in London with the New Philharmonia Orchestra in November 1968. For much of his career Ansermet recorded for Decca, beginning in September 1929 with a set of six of Handel's Concerti Grossi, recorded in London, (Note: Decca reissued the set on compact disc in 2024.) and continuing after the Second World War with 78 rpm sets, and then from 1950 mono LPs and from 1954 stereo LPs.

John Culshaw of Decca wrote of Ansermet, "He was considered by some to be over-intellectual as a conductor, and overt emotion was certainly not his strong point, but his care for the niceties of orchestral balance was amazing". Culshaw commented that not since working with George Szell had he heard such precision of balance, which applied to the orchestra as a whole and to its individual sections. The post-war 78 recordings caused a sensation by their clarity and wide frequency range, but in Culshaw's view it was not the new recording technique alone, but the quality of sound that Ansermet himself created that gave them such individuality.

By the mid-1950s Ansermet had, in Culshaw's view, already recorded virtually all the repertoire in which he excelled and was beginning to talk about Mozart, Beethoven and Brahms. To Culshaw it seemed nonsensical to record the Austro-German classics in Geneva when Decca had the Vienna Philharmonic under contract; but the Vienna Philharmonic did not want Ansermet in that repertoire, and Ansermet wanted to give employment to his Geneva musicians. Culshaw added that the orchestra, although not at all outstanding, was about the cheapest on Decca's books, and so Decca's first Beethoven symphony cycle was played by the SRO under Ansermet. The cycle was not enthusiastically received: reviews stating that Ansermet offered "good honest playing in fairly run-of-the-mill readings", "the Swiss players just cannot rival those on other performances in discipline and polish", "too relentless too often", and "Ansermet can certainly build up the tension when it is required but he seems unable to relax and allow the music to breathe" were typical, although the set of the Ninth was praised.

Ansermet conducted Decca's first stereophonic recordings, made with the SRO in Victoria Hall, Geneva in May 1954. They were produced by James Walker and included Russian tone-poems and overtures by Berlioz, Schumann and Gluck. Most of Ansermet's Decca recordings were with the SRO at Victoria Hall, a 1700-seat concert hall with magnificent acoustics. but he also recorded with the Orchestra of the Royal Opera House, the London Philharmonic Orchestra, the Paris Conservatoire Orchestra and the London Symphony Orchestra.

Ansermet's operatic sets include Debussy's Pelléas et Mélisande (1952 mono and 1963 stereo); Ravel's L'Heure espagnole (1952) and L'Enfant et les sortilèges (1955); and Stravinsky's Oedipus rex (1955), Renard (1955) and Mavra (1964). He twice recorded Ravel's Shéhérazade, with Suzanne Danco in 1954 and Régine Crespin in 1963.

== Compositions ==
After associating with Ravel and Stravinsky, Ansermet renounced any attempt to be a composer. His early works included some piano pieces and compositions for orchestra, among them a symphonic poem entitled Feuilles de Printemps (Leaves of Spring). He also orchestrated Debussy's Six épigraphes antiques in 1939.

== Writings ==
- Ansermet, Ernest. 1961. Les fondements de la musique dans la conscience humaine. 2 v. Neuchâtel: La Baconnière. New edition, edited by J.-Claude Piguet, Rose-Marie Faller-Fauconnet, et al. Neuchâtel: La Baconnière, 1987. ISBN 2-8252-0211-8
- Ansermet, Ernest. 1973. "L'apport de Paul Hindemith à la musique du XXe siècle." In Hommage à Paul Hindemith: 1895–1963 : l'homme et l'œuvre. Yverdon: Éditions de la Revue musicale de suisse romande.
- Ansermet, Ernest. 1983. Ecrits sur la musique. Edited by Jean-Claude Piguet. New rev. ed. Neuchâtel: La Baconnière. ISBN 2-8252-0207-X

=== Correspondence ===
- Piguet, Jean-Claude (ed.) 1976. Ernest Ansermet, Frank Martin: Correspondance, 1934–1968. Edited by Jean-Claude Piguet, with notes by Jacques Burdet. Neuchâtel: La Baconnière.
- Tappolet, Claude (ed.). 2006. Ernest Ansermet, correspondances avec des compositeurs américains (1926–1966): d'Aaron Copland à Virgil Thomson, les grands maîtres du nouveau monde. Geneva: Georg.
- Tappolet, Claude (ed.). 1999. Ernest Ansermet: Correspondances avec des chefs d'orchestre célèbres (1913–1969): précédées d'un Souvenir d'Arturo Toscanini par Ernest Ansermet (1967). Geneva: Georg. ISBN 2-8257-0662-0
- Tappolet, Claude (ed.). 1998. Correspondance E. Ansermet - J.-Claude Piguet (1948–1969). Preface by Philippe Dinkel, postface by Jean-Jacques Langendorf. Geneva: Georg Editeur.
- Tappolet, Claude (ed.). 1990–91. Correspondance Ansermet-Strawinsky (1914–1967). Geneva, Switzerland: Georg.
- Tappolet, Claude (ed.). 1989a. Correspondance Ansermet-Ramuz, 1906–1941. Preface by Maurice Zermatten. Geneva: Georg; Paris: Eshel. ISBN 2-8257-0183-1
- Tappolet, Claude (ed.). 1989b. Lettres de compositeurs suisses à Ernest Ansermet, 1906–1963 Avant-propos by Conrad Beck; postface by Julien-François Zbinden. Geneva: Georg. ISBN 2-8257-0169-6
- Tappolet, Claude (ed.). 1983. Correspondance Ernest Ansermet, R.-Aloys Mooser: 1915–1969. Précédée d'un Voyage à Munich (1924) et suivie d'un Hommage à Ernest Ansermet by R.-Aloys Mooser (1969). Preface by René Dovaz. Geneva: Georg. ISBN 2-8257-0092-4

== Notes, references and sources ==
=== Sources ===
- Andriessen, Louis; Elmer Schönberger (1989). The Apollonian Clockwork: On Stravinsky. Oxford and New York: Oxford University Press. ISBN 978-1-003-70518-5.
- Canarina, John (2003). Pierre Monteux, Maître. Pompton Plains: Amadeus Press. ISBN 978-1-57467-082-0.
- Chesterman, Robert (1976). "Ernest Ansermet". Conversations with Conductors. London: Robson Books. ISBN 978-0-903895-44-6.
- Culshaw, John (1981). Putting the Record Straight. London: Secker & Warburg. ISBN 978-0-436-11802-9.
- Dearling, Robert; Celia Dearling (1984). The Guinness Book of Recorded Sound. Enfield: Guinness Books. ISBN 978-0-85-112274-8.
- Gavoty, Bernard (1961). Ernest Ansermet. Geneva: René Kister. OCLC 7060715.
- Hudry, François (1983). Ernest Ansermet, pionnier de la musique (in French). Lausanne: Éditions de l'Aire. OCLC 10273132.
- March, Ivan; Edward Greenfield; Denis Stevens (1967). The Penguin Guide to Bargain Records. London: Penguin. OCLC 249855642.
- Rothe, Anne (1949). Current Biography. New York: H. H. Wilson. OCLC 820891481.
- Sheffi, Na'ama (2000). The Ring of Myths: the Israelis, Wagner, and the Nazis. Brighton and Portland: Sussex Academic Press. ISBN 978-1-902210-52-0.
- Stuart, Philip (2009). Decca Classical 1929–2009. London: CHARM, King's College, London.
