= Gustave Doret =

Swiss composer and conductor

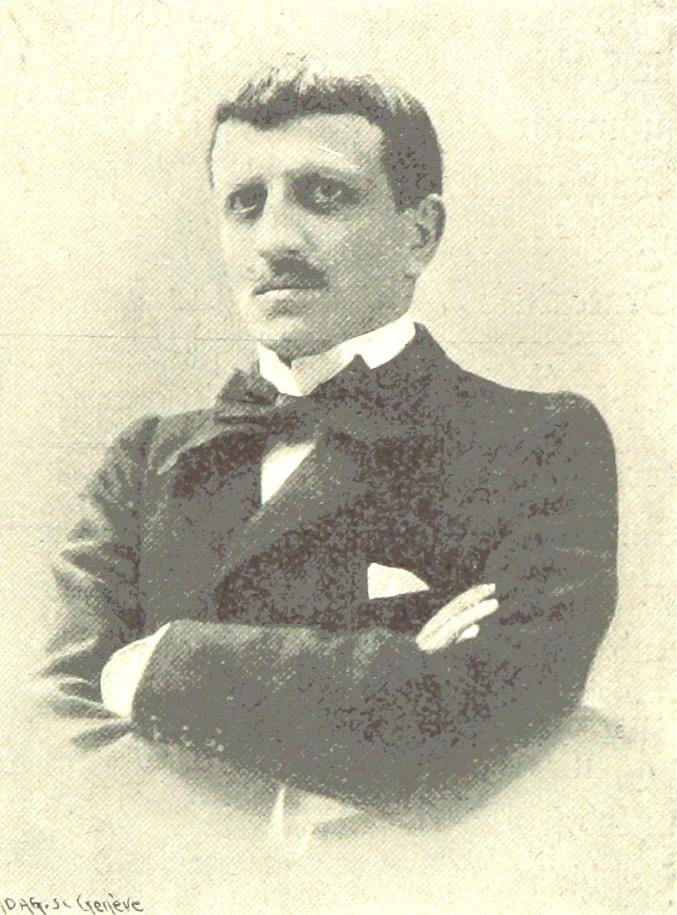
- Doret in 1940
- Born: Gustave Charles Vincent Mathey-Doret; 20 September 1866; Aigle, Switzerland
- Died: 19 April 1943 (aged 76)
- Occupations: Music composer and conductor
- Awards: Legion of Honour - Knight (1915)

Gustave Charles Vincent Mathey-Doret (20 September 1866 – 19 April 1943) was a Swiss composer and conductor.

== Career ==
Doret was born in 1866 in Aigle, Switzerland. He studied at the Berlin Academy of Music with Joseph Joachim, and then at the Conservatoire de Paris with Théodore Dubois and Jules Massenet. His career as a conductor began in 1894 in Paris, where he led the first performance of Debussy's Prélude à l'après-midi d'un faune. He was second conductor of the Concerts d'Harcourt from 1893 to 1895 and director of the Opéra-Comique in the 1890s and 1900s. He was also the founder of the Théâtre du Jorat, in Mézières.

His two serious operas, heavily indebted to Massenet, were performed in Paris; his light opera and other stage works were far more popular across French-speaking Europe. In 1914, Doret returned to Switzerland and began studying local popular music and folk music traditions. He also wrote for Swiss newspapers and wrote a memoir, Temps et contretemps, published in 1942.

Most of his output was vocal, and included operas, music theatre pieces, one oratorio, choral music, and more than 300 songs. His only instrumental works were two orchestral pieces, a string quartet, and a piano quintet. His work was part of the music event in the art competition at the 1912 Summer Olympics.

Doret died in 1943 in Lausanne.

== Awards ==
Doret was made a Knight of the Legion of Honour (decree: 17 February 1915).

== Works ==
- Les Sept paroles du Christ (1895), oratorio
- Les Armaillis (1900), opera
- Fête des Vignerons (1905)
- Aliénor (1910), stage music
- La Nuit des Quatre Temps (1910), stage music
- Tell (1914), stage music
- Fête des Vignerons (1927)
- La Servante d'Evolène (1937)
