= Le Roi David =

Oratorio by Arthur Honegger

- Psaume symphonique en trois parties
- Oratorio by Arthur Honegger
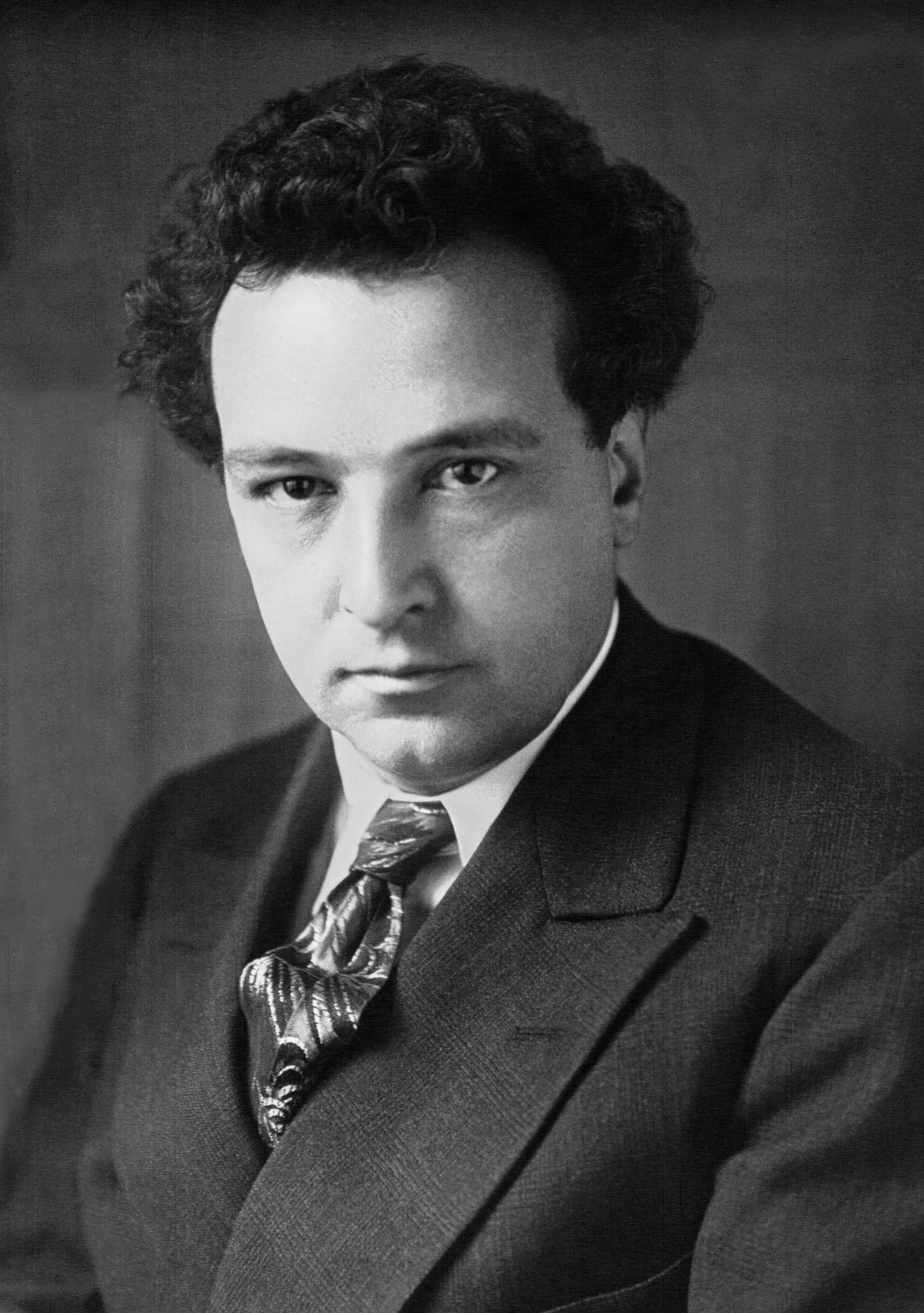
- The composer in 1928
- English: King David / Symphonic Psalm in Three Parts
- Text: by René Morax
- Language: French
- Based on: King David's life
- Performed: 12 May 1938: Basel
- Movements: 27
- Scoring: narrator; soprano, alto, tenor, and boy soprano soloists; SATB choir; orchestra

Le Roi David was composed in Mézières, Switzerland, in 1921 by Arthur Honegger, as incidental music for a play in French by René Morax. It was called a dramatic psalm, but has also been performed as oratorio, without staging. The plot, based on biblical narration, tells the story of King David, first a shepherd boy, his victories in battle, relationship to Saul, rise to power, adultery, mourning of his son's death, and finally his own death. The work has 27 musical movements consisting of voice solos, choruses, and instrumental interludes. A narrator unifies the work by providing spoken narration of the story of King David.

Arthur Honegger was commissioned to write incidental music to accompany René Morax's play Le Roi David in 1921. The commission outlined that the work was to be performed by 100 singers and seventeen instruments. Honegger struggled with these limited resources, and wrote to Igor Stravinsky for advice. Stravinsky advised him to think as if he had purposefully chosen that instrumentation, and compose as such. Honegger had a nearly impossible deadline of two months to complete the work. This short deadline made it necessary for him to write the movements of this 27-movement work out of order. First, he wrote the choral and solo voice parts to allow the music to be copied and rehearsed. Honegger wrote the orchestration for the entire work last. He completed his composition on May 20, 1921, and was rewarded with much acclaim at the premiere on June 11, 1921. In 1923 he combined Morax's narrative with his music and created a "symphonic psalm", the form that is familiar today, and titled his work Le Roi David.

== Instrumentation ==
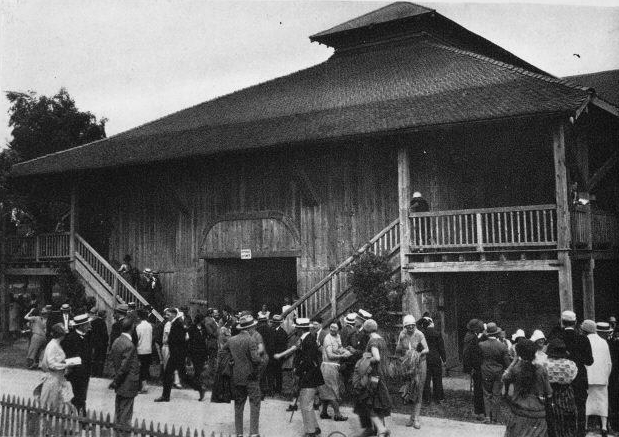
Théâtre du Jorat, Mézières, where the dramatic psalm was first performed

Original 1921 version: Honegger originally wrote his Le Roi David music for the forces that were available at Morax's Mézières village theatre group, creating a score for the resources available; a small ensemble of 16 musicians comprising: 2 flutes [1 doubling piccolo], 1 oboe [doubling cor anglais], 2 clarinets [1 doubling bass clarinet], 1 bassoon, 1 horn, 2 trumpets, 1 trombone, timpani, 1 percussionist (playing snare drum, bass drum, cymbals, tambourine, and tam-tam), piano, harmonium, celesta and 1 double bass. It was premiered there on 11 June 1921.

In 1923, bolstered by the success of the original version, Honegger re-scored the work for a standard orchestra of 2 flutes [1 doubling piccolo], 2 oboes [1 doubling cor anglais], 2 clarinets [1 doubling bass clarinet], 2 bassoons [1 doubling contrabassoon], 4 horns, 2 trumpets, 3 trombones, tuba, timpani, snare drum, bass drum, cymbals, tambourine, tam-tam, organ, celesta, harp, and strings) accompanying a chorus (often singing antiphonally or in unison), soprano, alto, tenor, and boy soprano soloists, a narrator and an actress for no. 12 – Incantation Scene (Saul and the witch of Endor). The music is separated into 27 mostly brief sections and features many individual instruments.

== Structure ==
The work is structured in three parts, the movements numbered to 27 in the 1952 edition (28 in the first edition).

Part I
No.	Title	Translation	Text source	Voices
1	Introduction			
2	Cantique du berger David	The Song of David, the Shepherd		A
3	Psaume: Loué soit le Seigneur	Psalm: All Praise to Him	Psalm	SATB
4	Chant de victoire	Song of Victory		SATB
5	Cortège	March		
6	Psaume: Ne crains rien	Psalm: In the Lord I Put my Faith	Psalm	T
7	Psaume: Ah! si j'avais des ailes de colombe	Psalm: O Had I Wings Like a Dove	Psalm	S
8	Psaume – Cantique des Prophètes	Song of the Prophets		men's chorus
9	Psaume: Pitié de moi, mon Dieu	Psalm: Have Mercy on Me, my Lord	Psalm	T
10	Le Camp de Saül	Saul's Camp		
11	Psaume: L'éternel est ma lumière infinie	Psalm: God, the Lord Shall Be my Light		SATB
12	Incantation	Incantation		A (speaking)
13	Marche des Philistins	March of the Philistines		
14	Lamentations de Guilboa	The Lamentations of Gilboa		Women's chorus

Part II
No.	Title	Translation	Text source	Voices
15	Cantique de fête	Festival Song		women's chorus
16	La Danse devant l'arche	The Dance before the Ark		SATB

Part III
No.	Title	Translation	Text source	Voices
17	Cantique: De mon cœur jaillit un cantique	Song: Now my Voice in Song Upsoaring		SATB
18	Chant de la servante	Song of the Handmaid		A
19	Psaume de pénitence	Psalm of Penitence		SATB
20	Psaume: Je fus conçu dans le péché	Psalm: Behold, in Evil I Was Born		SATB
21	Psaume: Je lève mes regards vers la montagne	Psalm: O Shall I Raise mine Eyes unto the Mountains?		T
22	La Chanson d'Ephraïm	The Song of Ephraim		S women's chorus
23	Marche des Hébreux	March of the Hebrews		
24	Psaume: Je t'aimerai, Seigneur, d'un amour tendre	Psalm: In my Distress		SATB
25	Psaume: Dans cet effroi	Psalm: In this Terror, the Great God which I Adore		SATB
26	Couronnement de Salomon	The Coronation of Solomon		
27	Mort de David	The Death of David		S SATB

== Plot ==
Le Roi David is divided into three main parts and tells the biblical story of King David. In the first part, the Lord directs the prophet Samuel to choose Saul as the ruler of the people of Israel. However, when Saul does not follow the Lord's instructions, Samuel is told to place David as ruler. The first part continues to tell the story of David's battles against the Philistines as well as Saul's growing jealousy of David. The second part covers David's crowning and unification of Israel. The third and final part tells of David's lust for Bathsheba and his punishment for adultery. In this final section of the piece, David flees Jerusalem, loses his power, manages to restore his position as king then offends God by censusing the people. An epidemic disease afflicts Jerusalem, and David appoints his son Solomon to succeed him and then dies. At the end of the piece an angel tells of Isaiah's prophecy of a flower blooming from David's stem.

== Analysis of text and music ==
The most significant element of Le Roi David is the combination of different styles of music in one complete work. Honegger uses compositional techniques ranging from Gregorian chant to Baroque to jazz. Honegger's utilization of all of these concepts allowed him to make a serious contribution to the neoclassical era. The music is full of thematic gestures and is most often performed in French. There is an English version by Edward Agate.
