= La Patrie suisse =

Swiss illustrated magazine (1893–1962)

- A page of issue no. 494, August 1912
- Frequency: Twice monthly (1893–1927), weekly (1927–1962)
- Founder: George W. Brooke
- First issue: 4 October 1893
- Final issue: May 1962
- Country: Switzerland
- Language: French

La Patrie suisse was a Swiss illustrated magazine. Its first issue came off the press in Geneva on 4 October 1893, and in May 1962 it was absorbed by La Femme d'aujourd'hui. Politically and denominationally neutral, it was devoted almost exclusively to national subjects.

== History ==
The first issue of La Patrie suisse came off the press in Geneva on 4 October 1893. The magazine appeared twice a month until 1927 and weekly after that. It was printed by, among others, Atar, and its publishers included the American George W. Brooke (1861–1939) and the Jura journalist Paul Wisard (1870–1911). Brooke, who created the magazine, founded in 1896 the graphic arts company that took the name Atar in 1905.

As a politically and denominationally neutral magazine, La Patrie suisse was devoted almost exclusively to national subjects, with an emphasis on domestic politics, the army, nature, sport (mountaineering, winter sports, aviation), patriotic festivals, the Swiss abroad and the arts. It also opened its columns to writers; after 1932 these included Léon Savary and Emmanuel Buenzod. Its abundant illustrations and its obituaries make it an interesting source.

In 1927 the magazine enlarged its format and increased its number of pages, originally twelve. Competition from new illustrated magazines covering international news reduced the number of subscribers. In 1930 La Patrie suisse was bought by Gottlieb Meyer, which saved it for a few decades. In May 1962 it was absorbed by La Femme d'aujourd'hui, a magazine also published by Meyer's publishing house.

== Bibliography ==
- F. Blaser, Bibliographie der Schweizer Presse, 1956–1958, 761
- La Patrie suisse, 2 October 1943 (special issue)
