= Charles Munch (conductor) =

French conductor (1891–1968)

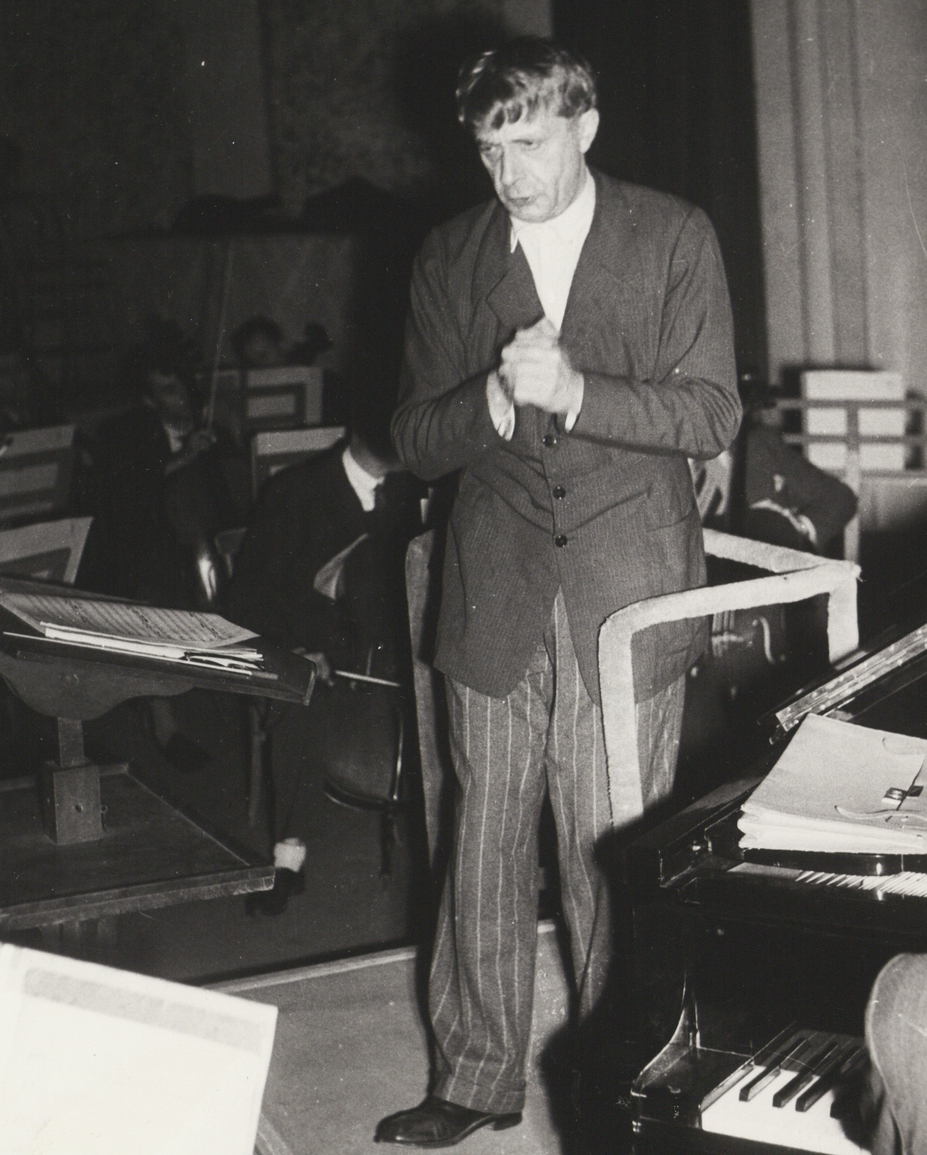

Background information
- Born: Karl Münch; 26 September 1891; Strasbourge, Alsace,
- Died: 6 November 1968 (aged 77)
- Genre: Classical
- Occupation: Conductor
- Instrument: Violin

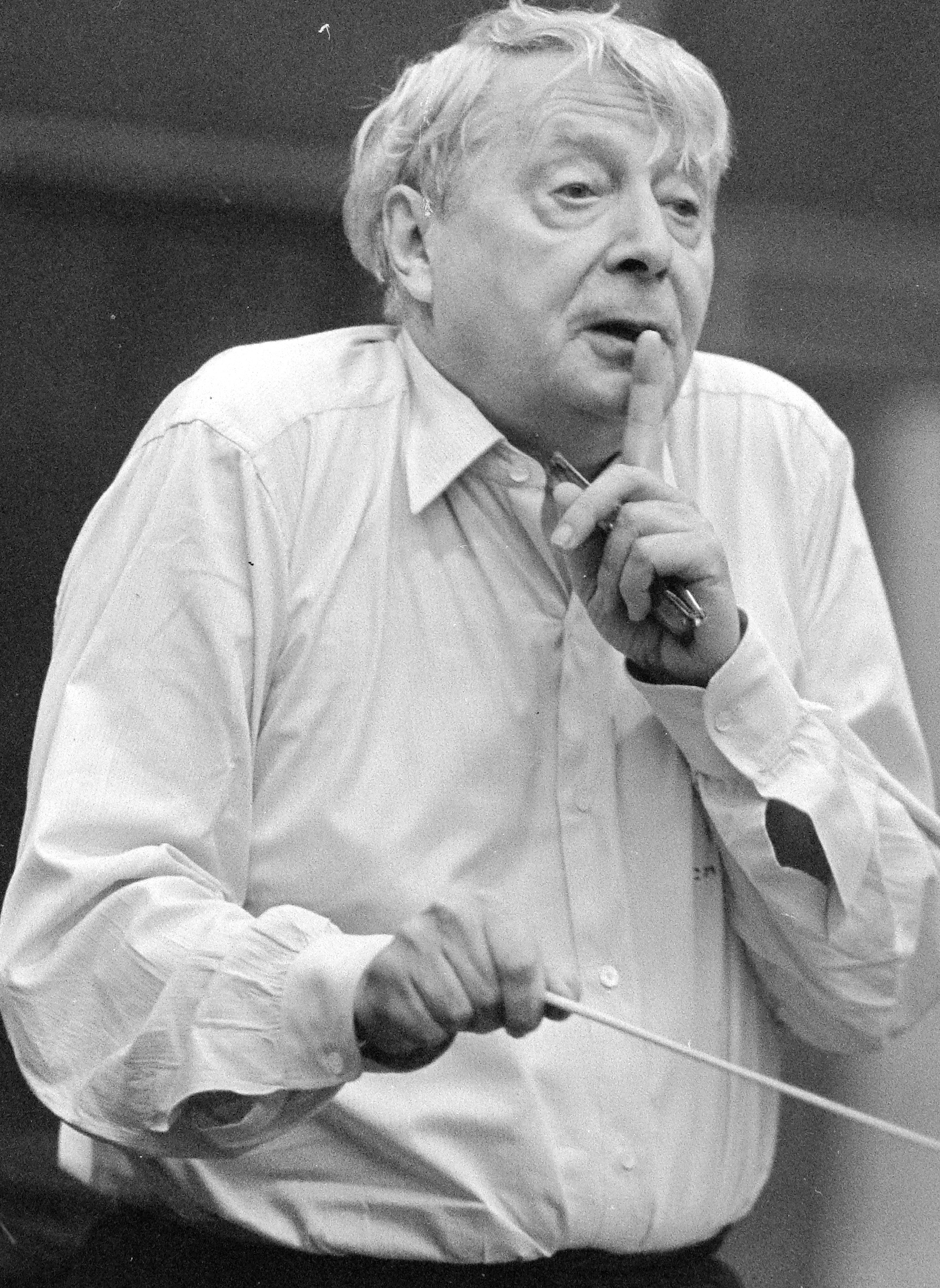
Charles Munch in the Hungarian Radio, 1966, Budapest

Charles Munch (French pronunciation: [ʃaʁl mynʃ]; born Karl Münch; 26 September 1891 – 6 November 1968) was an Alsatian French symphonic conductor and violinist. Noted for his mastery of the French orchestral repertoire, he was best known for his tenure as music director of the Boston Symphony Orchestra between 1949 and 1962.

== Life and career ==
Munch was born in 1891 in Strasbourg, Alsace. The son of organist and choir director Ernst Münch, he was the fifth of six children. He was the brother of conductor Fritz Münch and the cousin of conductor and composer Hans Münch. Although his first ambition was to be a locomotive engineer, he studied violin at the Strasbourg Conservatory. His father, Ernst, was a professor of organ at the conservatory and performed at the cathedral; he also directed an orchestra with his son Charles in the second violins.

After receiving his diploma in 1912, Charles studied with Carl Flesch in Berlin and Lucien Capet at the Conservatoire de Paris. He was conscripted into the German army in World War I, serving as a sergeant gunner. He was gassed at Péronne and wounded at Verdun. Munch considered that "as an Alsacian and as a musician, [he was] purely and profoundly German, but that [he was] a friend of many countries and first and foremost a musician and a conductor".

In 1920, Munch became professor of violin at the Strasbourg Conservatory and assistant concertmaster of the Strasbourg Philharmonic Orchestra under Joseph Guy Ropartz, who directed the conservatory. In the early 1920s he was concertmaster for Hermann Abendroth's Gürzenich Orchestra in Cologne. He then served as concertmaster of the Leipzig Gewandhaus Orchestra under Wilhelm Furtwängler and Bruno Walter from 1926 to 1933.

At the age of 41, Munch made his conducting debut in Paris on 1 November 1932. Munch's fiancée, Geneviève Maury, granddaughter of a founder of the Nestlé Chocolate Company, rented the hall and hired the Walther Straram Concerts Orchestra. Munch also studied conducting with Czech conductor Fritz Zweig, who had fled Berlin during his tenure at Berlin's Krolloper.

Following this success, Munch conducted the Concerts Siohan, the Lamoureux Orchestra, the new Orchestre Symphonique de Paris, the Biarritz Orchestra (Summer 1933), the Société Philharmonique de Paris (1935 to 1938), and the Orchestre de la Société des concerts du Conservatoire (1937 to 1946). He became known as a champion of Hector Berlioz, and befriended Arthur Honegger, Albert Roussel, and Francis Poulenc. During these years, Munch gave first performances of works by Honegger, Jean Roger-Ducasse, Joseph Guy Ropartz, Roussel, and Florent Schmitt. He became director of the Société Philharmonique de Paris in 1938 and was featured in the French epic Les Enfants du Paradis, filmed (1945) during the German occupation of Paris. For two years, he taught conducting at the École Normale de Musique (from 1937 to 1939). One of his pupils there was also Czech composer-conductor Vítězslava Kaprálová.

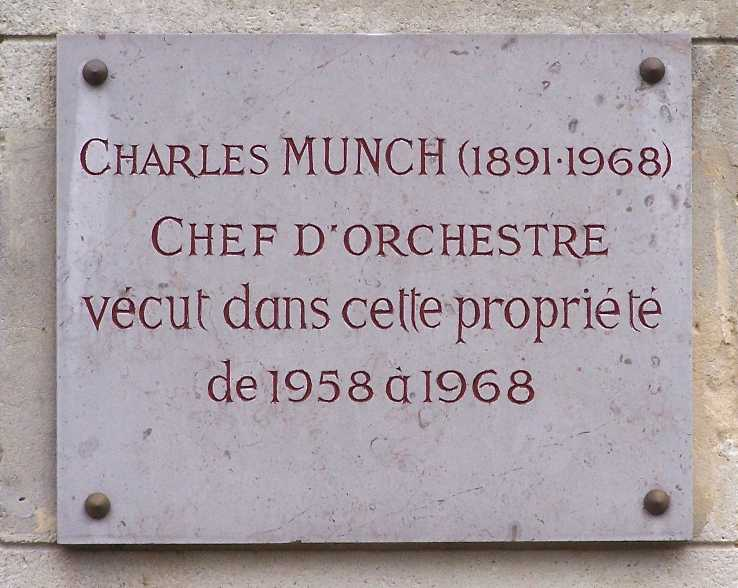
Plaque at Place Émile Dreux, village de Voisins in Louveciennes, Yvelines, France

Munch remained in France conducting the Conservatoire Orchestra during the German occupation, believing it best to maintain the morale of the French people. He refused conducting engagements in Germany and also refused to perform contemporary German works. He protected members of his orchestra from the Gestapo and contributed from his income to the French Resistance. For this, he received the Légion d'honneur with the red ribbon in 1945 and the degree of Commandeur in 1952.

=== Boston Symphony Orchestra ===
Munch made his début with the Boston Symphony Orchestra on 27 December 1946. He was its music director from 1949 to 1962. Munch was also director of the Berkshire Music Festival and Berkshire Music Center (Tanglewood) from 1951 through 1962. He led relaxed rehearsals which orchestra members appreciated after the authoritarian Serge Koussevitzky. Among his pupils at Tanglewood was Serge Fournier and the first prize winner of the International Competition of Orchestra Conductors, Seiji Ozawa. Munch also received honorary degrees from Boston College, Boston University, Brandeis University, Harvard University, and the New England Conservatory of Music.

He excelled in the modern French repertoire, especially Claude Debussy and Maurice Ravel, and was considered to be an authoritative performer of Hector Berlioz. However, Munch's programs also regularly featured works by composers such as Bach, Haydn, Mozart, Beethoven, Schubert, Schumann, Brahms, and Wagner. His thirteen-year tenure in Boston included 39 world premieres and 58 American first performances, and offered audiences 168 contemporary works. Fourteen of these premieres were works commissioned by the Boston Symphony and the Koussevitzky Music Foundation to celebrate the orchestra's 75th anniversary in 1956. (A 15th commission was never completed.)

Munch invited former Boston Symphony music director Pierre Monteux to guest conduct, record, and tour with the orchestra after an absence of more than 25 years. Under Munch, guest conductors became an integral part of the Boston Symphony's programming, both in Boston and at Tanglewood.

Munch led the Boston Symphony on its first transcontinental tour of the United States in 1953. He became the first conductor to take them on tour overseas: Europe in 1952 and 1956, and East Asia and Australia in 1960. During the 1956 tour, the Boston Symphony was the first American orchestra to perform in the Soviet Union.

The Boston Symphony under Munch recorded prodigiously for RCA Victor from 1949 to 1962.

Selections from Boston Symphony rehearsals under Leonard Bernstein, Koussevitzky, and Munch were broadcast nationally on the NBC Radio Network from 1948–1951. NBC carried portions of the orchestra's performances from 1954–1957. Beginning in 1951, the BSO was broadcast over local radio stations in the Boston area. Starting in 1957, Boston Symphony performances under Munch and guest conductors were disseminated regionally, nationally, and internationally through the Boston Symphony Transcription Trust. Under Munch, the Boston Symphony appeared on television. The first BSO television broadcast was under Bernstein in 1949 at Carnegie Hall.

=== Orchestre de Paris ===
Munch returned to France and in 1963 became president of the École Normale de Musique. He was also named president of the Guilde française des artistes solistes. During the 1960s, Munch appeared regularly as a guest conductor throughout America, Europe, and Japan. In 1967, at the request of France's minister of culture, André Malraux, he founded the first full-time salaried French orchestra, the Orchestre de Paris, and conducted its first concert on 14 November 1967. The following year, he died of a heart attack suffered at his hotel in Richmond, Virginia while on an American tour with his new orchestra. His remains were returned to France where he is buried in the Cimetière de Louveciennes. EMI recorded his final sessions, including Ravel's Piano Concerto in G, with this orchestra, and released them posthumously.

== Books ==
In 1955, Oxford University Press published I Am a Conductor by Munch in a translation by Leonard Burkat. It was originally issued in 1954 in French as Je suis chef d'orchestre. The work is a collection of Munch's thoughts on conducting and the role of a conductor.

D. Kern Holoman wrote Munch's first biography in English, Charles Munch. It was published by Oxford University Press in 2011.

== Recordings ==
Munch's discography is extensive, both in Boston on RCA Victor and at his various European posts and guest conducting assignments on various labels, including English Decca, EMI, Nonesuch, Erato and Auvidis-Valois.

He began making records in Paris before the war, for EMI. Munch then made a renowned series of Decca Full Frequency Range Recordings (FFRR) in the late 1940s. After several recordings with the New York Philharmonic for Columbia, Munch began making recordings for RCA Victor soon after his arrival in Boston as music director. These included memorable Berlioz, Honegger, Roussel, and Saint-Saëns tapings.

His first stereophonic recording with the Boston Symphony, in Boston's Symphony Hall in February 1954, was devoted to a complete version of The Damnation of Faust by Hector Berlioz and was made simultaneously in monaural and experimental stereophonic sound, although only the mono recording was released commercially. The stereo tape survives only fragmentarily. The monaural version of this recording was added to the Library of Congress's national registry of sound. Among his final recordings in Boston was a 1962 performance of César Franck's symphonic poem Le chasseur maudit.

Upon Munch's return to Paris, he made Erato disks with the Orchestre Lamoureux, and with the Orchestre de Paris he again recorded for EMI. He also made recordings for a number of other companies including Decca/London.

A number of Munch's recordings have been available continuously since their original releases, among them Saint-Saëns's Organ Symphony and Ravel's Daphnis and Chloe. RCA reissued Munch Conducts Berlioz in a multi-disc set, including all of their Munch recordings. BMG/Japan has issued two different editions of Munch's RCA Victor recordings on CD, 1998 and 2006. The latter was made up of 41 CDs and encompassed all but a handful of Munch recordings with the Boston Symphony. in 2016, Sony released all of Munch's Columbia and RCA Victor recordings including performances by the Boston Symphony Orchestra, New York Philharmonic, and Philadelphia Orchestra. Many of these had never been officially released on compact disc. In 2018, Warner Classics issued a comprehensive CD box set of Munch's recordings, drawn from their archives of the labels of the former EMI group. Eloquence Australia released a CD box set of Munch's complete DECCA recordings in 2020.

== Television ==
The Boston Symphony appeared on television with Munch locally on WGBH-TV, Boston, and nationally through a syndicated series. NHK broadcast throughout Japan the opening concert of the Boston Symphony's tour of Japan in 1960. Munch also appeared on film or television with the Chicago Symphony Orchestra, the Czech Philharmonic, the Hungarian Radio and Television Orchestra, the Orchestre National de l'ORTF, and the Orchestre de Radio-Canada. Several of these performances have been issued on DVD.
