= Hollitzer =

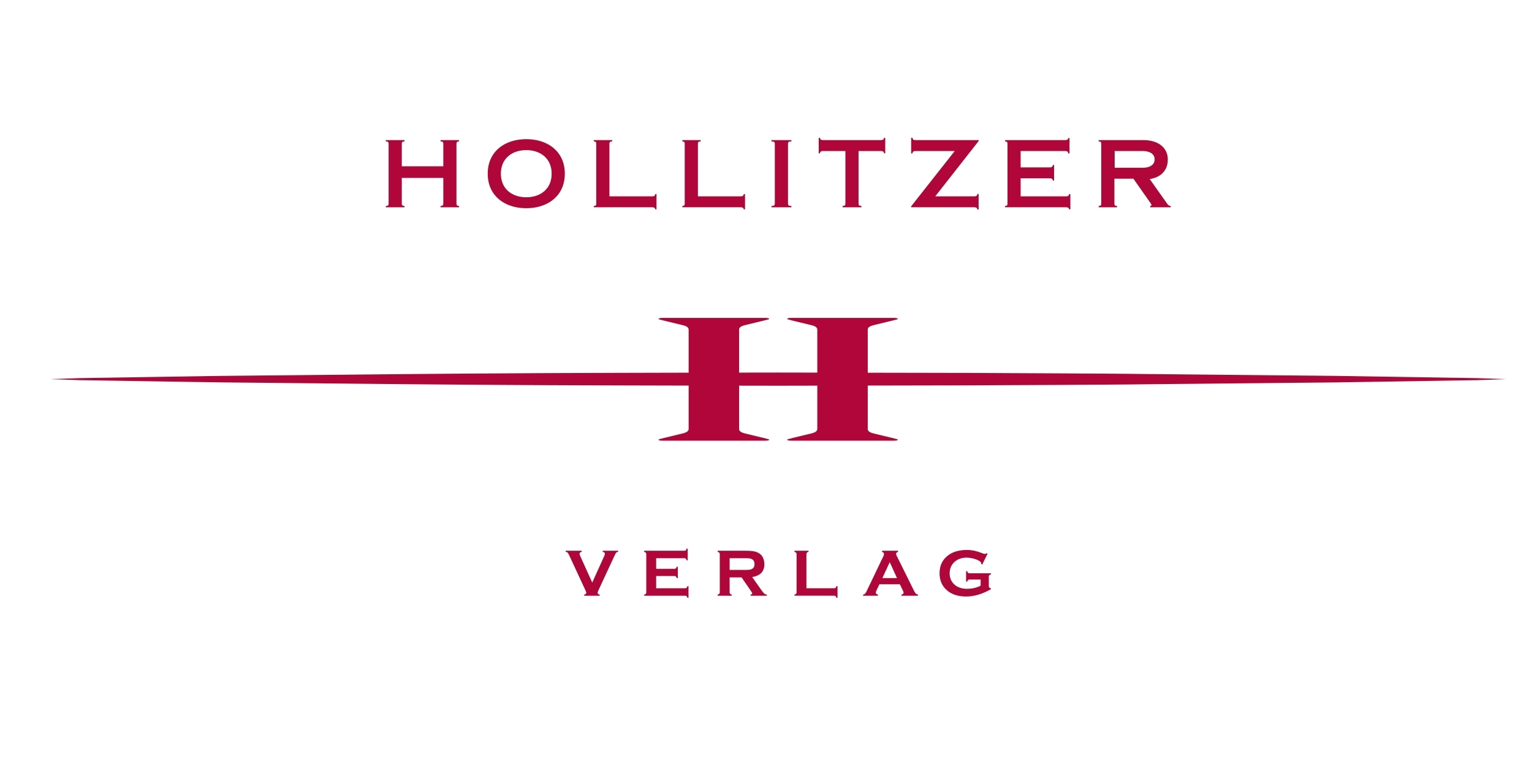
- Parent company: Hollitzer Baustoffwerke (founded in 1849)
- Status: Active
- Founded: 2010
- Founder: H.E. Weidinger
- Country of origin: Austria
- Headquarters location: Trautsongasse in the district of Josefstadt, Vienna
- Distribution: Austria, Germany, Switzerland, United Kingdom, Italy
- Key people: Michael Hüttler, CEO
- Publication types: Books
- Official website: www.hollitzer.at

Hollitzer is an Austrian publisher, founded in 2010 and located in Vienna.

== Programme ==
The main emphasis of Hollitzer lays on theatre, music and cultural history. Starting with the edition of books for the partner institution Don Juan Archiv, the publishing house developed a concept mainly geared towards 17th and 18th century, also emphasizing on the rapports between the Ottoman Empire and the cultural history of Europe. Hollitzer presented several scientific publications in close cooperation with renowned universities and other scientific institutions; its books are in German, partially also in English and Italian.

=== Literature ===
In 2015, Hollitzer started to publish Belles-lettres. Its first publication in this field was dedicated to the Serbian-Sephardic novelist Gordana Kuić and her Scent of Rain in the Balkans, thitherto not published in German language. This book was followed by the bright drama Don Juan turns sixty by well-known Austrian littérateur Robert Schindel. Both titles were presented at the Leipzig Book Fair and with readings in Vienna. They both achieved broad acclaim from book trade and readership.

Prequels of the new Literature Section at Hollitzer were a series on reprints of baroque drama literature by Philipp Hafner, Franz von Heufeld and Johann Joseph Felix von Kurz, as well as a new edition of the Letters of an Unknown by Alexander von Villers.

=== Scientific Publications ===
Hollitzer cultivates a continuous collaboration with the Universität Mozarteum Salzburg. It publishes their annual Almanac as well as two series of scientific book publications; one of them is dedicated to the history of the university (with monographic works on former rectors of the institution), the other one dedicated to the History of Music in Salzburg. Together with the Austrian Academy of Sciences Hollitzer presented a comprehensive volume on the role of music during the revolutions of 1848 in the Austrian Empire. Further cooperations include the Viennese University of Music and Performing Arts (Music and Remembrance) and the Lucerne University of Applied Sciences and Arts (on Wolfgang Rihm).

The close cooperation with the partner institution Don Juan Archiv Wien lead to four series — Bibliographica, Summa Summarum, Theatralia and Ottomania, the latter dedicated to the dialogue between the Ottoman Empire and Europe in the field of performing arts. Amongst the internationally renowned authors of Hollitzer are historians Emil Brix and İlber Ortaylı, musicologists Filiz Ali and Mário Vieira de Carvalho, conductor Josef Wallnig and composer Gerhard Wimberger.

=== Periodicals ===
The publishing house is also presenting scientific periodicals and almanacs such as TheMA, short for Theatre, Music, Arts, an Open Access Research Journal for scientific articles on music, theatre and the arts, as well as the Almanac of University Mozarteum, edited by Wolfgang Gratzer. Furthermore Hollitzer is responsible for the e-book version of Nestroyana, dedicated to Austrians famous comedian Johann Nestroy, and since 2015 also for the well-known Österreichische Musikzeitschrift (Austria's Music Journal).

== Venues ==
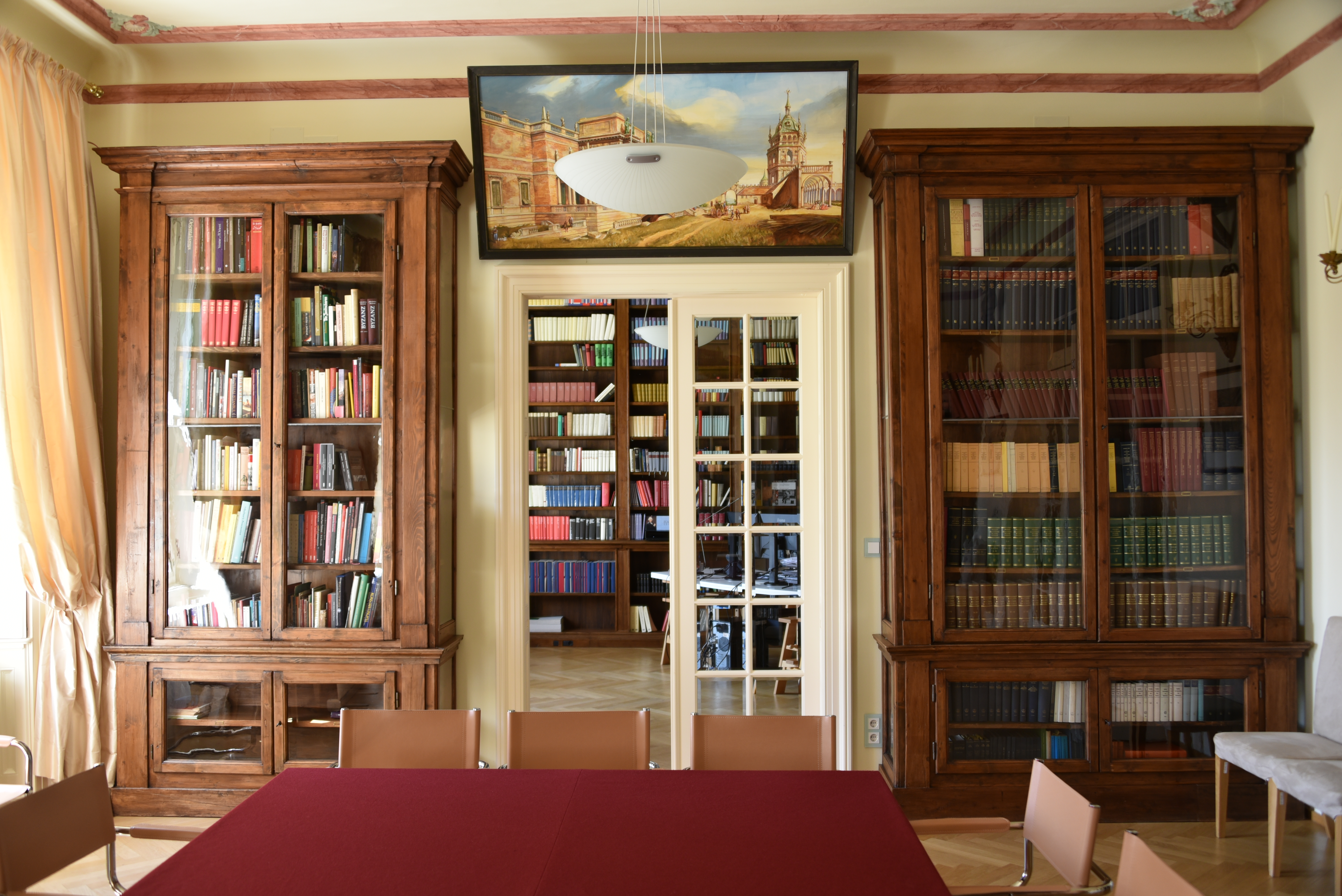
Venues at Vienna's Trautsongasse

The headquarter is situated in representative venues at the Trautsongasse in Vienna's eighth district, the Josefstadt. The affiliate organizations Don Juan Archiv and Studium Faesolanum are located at the same address. The main conference room can be connected with two other rooms and is regularly used for readings, lectures and symposia of the three institutions. The venues are also made available for external organizations.
