= Riemann Musiklexikon =

German music encyclopedia

The Riemann Musiklexikon (RML), is a music encyclopedia founded in 1882 by Hugo Riemann. The 13th edition appeared in 2012.

== History ==
The Riemann Musiklexikon is the last undertaking of an individual to write a comprehensive encyclopedia in the field of music. The first edition of the encyclopaedia was published in 1882 under the title Hugo Riemann Musik-Lexikon. Theorie und Geschichte der Musik, die Tonkünstler alter und neuer Zeit mit Angabe ihrer Werke, nebst einer vollständigen Instrumentenkunde (Hugo Riemann Musik-Lexikon. Theory and history of music, the composers (literally: tone artists) of old and new times with lists of their works, together with a complete description of instruments). In the following editions the volume was constantly expanded; the seventh edition had 1598 pages compared to the first with 1036 pages. The last edition published by Riemann was the eighth (Leipzig 1916). He completely revised the lexicon for the ninth edition which was published in Berlin in 1919, after his death.

The tenth edition was the last in one volume (Berlin 1922) contained a large number of biographical articles, which Alfred Einstein deleted for the eleventh edition (Berlin 1929), in two volumes, and the first set in antiqua). Einstein argued: "Lebensdaten uns völlig entfremdeter Musiker aus der zweiten Hälfte des 19. Jahrhunderts ..." (Biographical data of musicians from the second half of the 19th century, completely alien to us, were erased. However, their works partly regain importance again, and hardly anything can be found about them in other encyclopaedias.

Einstein supervised the work from the ninth to the eleventh edition. When he emigrated, the Riemann became known and popular in the Anglo-American world. The musicologist Joseph Müller-Blattau tried a 12th edition, begun in 1939, aiming to bring the work in line with Nazi concepts, but managed only three deliveries.

After World War II, a 12th edition was published, entitled Riemann Musiklexikon, from 1958 to 1975 in three volumes and two supplementary volumes edited by Wilibald Gurlitt (Volumes 1 and 2, Biographies, 1959-61), Hans Heinrich Eggebrecht (Volume 3, Facts, 1967) and Carl Dahlhaus (Volumes 4 and 5, Additions, 1972, 1975). It was printed by Schott in Mainz. It became the most widely used profound music encyclopaedia of the post-war period. The Brockhaus Riemann, a paperback edition in five volumes, was published in 1989 and 1995, aiming to meet the demands of both experts and music lovers. It is more compressed than the Riemann Musiklexikon, but on the other hand more up to date.

The 13th, revised and updated edition of the Musiklexikon was published by Schott at the beginning of 2012, edited by Wolfgang Ruf, comprising five volumes with more than 9400 articles on subjects and persons from music theory and performance practice as well as bibliographies and catalogues of works.
