= Jorge Peixinho =

Portuguese composer (born 1940)

Jorge Manuel Marques Peixinho Rosado (born 20 January 1940 — 30 June 1995) was a Portuguese composer, pianist and conductor.

== Life and career ==
Born in Montijo, Portugal, Peixinho studied composition and piano at the Conservatory of Lisbon from 1951 through 1958. At that institution he was a pupil of Artur Santos and Jorge Croner de Vasconcelos. He then pursued graduate studies in music composition at the Accademia Nazionale di Santa Cecilia in Rome where he was mentored in composition by Boris Porena and Goffredo Petrassi; graduating in 1961. In 1960 he worked with Luigi Nono in Venice, and with Pierre Boulez and Karlheinz Stockhausen at the City of Basel Music Academy. From 1960 through 1970 he was a participant in the Darmstädter Ferienkurse, as both student and lecturer. He began teaching courses in contemporary music in 1962 at the Lisbon Conservatory, and at other institutions in Portugal and South America.

In 1970, he created the Lisbon Contemporary Music Group with Clotilde Rosa, and worked at the IPEM studio in Ghent from 1972 to 1973.

== Death ==
He died in Lisbon, Portugal on June 30, 1995.

== Works (selective list) ==
- Tríptico, for voices / soli, choirs, and various instrumental ensembles (1959)
- Sucessões Simétricas I, for piano solo (1960)
- Episódios, for string quartet (1960)
- Políptico, for chamber orchestra (1960)
- Episódios, for string quartet (1960)
- Concerto for Saxophone and Orchestra (1961)
- Episódios, for string quartet (1960)
- Diafonia, for harp, harpsichord + piano (one player), celesta, percussion and 12 stringed instruments (1963–65)
- Morfocromia, for 12 instruments divided up into three sections (1963–66)
- Kinetofonias, for large string orchestra divided up into three sections (1965–68)
- CDE, for clarinet, violin, cello, and piano (1970)
- Sucessões Simétricas II, for orchestra (1971)
- As Quatro Estações, for trumpet, cello, harp and piano (1968–72)
- Voix, for chamber orchestra and mezzo-soprano (1972)
- A Idade do Ouro, for 2 clarinets & bass clarinets, 2 violins, harp, harpsichord, piano & organ (1973)
- Recitativo IV, for flute, harp, guitar, viola, cello, piano, melodica, percussion and tape (1974)
- Música em Água e Marmore, for flute, trumpet, harp, guitar, violin, cello and synthesizer (1977)
- Electronicolírica, for tape (1979)
- Elegy for Amilcar Cabral / "Elegia a Amílcar Cabral", an electroacoustic composition (1978)
- Mémoires... Miroirs... , concerto - for amplified clavichord and 12 stringed instruments (1980)
- Canto para Anna Livia / "Song for Anna Livia", for soprano, mezzo-soprano, alto, flute, recorder, cello, celesta, organ and three percussionists (1981)
- Retrato de Helena / "Portrait of Helen", for chamber orchestra (1982)
- Concerto de Outono / "Autumn Concerto", for oboe and orchestra (1983)
- O Jardim de Belisa, for chamber ensemble (1984)
- Ouçam a soma dos sons que soam, for flute, clarinet, piano, percussion and string quintet (1986)
- Canto Germinal, electroacoustic music (1989)
- Passage Interieur, for saxophones, electric guitar, electric bass, synthesizer and electronic drum set (1989)
- Alis, for chamber orchestra / 15 instruments (1990)
- Floreal, for flute, bass clarinet, harp, celesta, violin and viola (1992)
- Nocturno no Cabo do Mundo, sonata for three pianos (1993)
- Concerto for Harp and Orchestra (1995)

== Recordings of his work (selection) ==
- Música I (Cinco pequenas peças "Five Short Pieces", Collage I, Estudo I, Harmónicos, Sucessões Simétricas I). Jorge Peixinho and Filipe de Sousa, pianos.

LP: Tecla, 1972 (reed. CD: Jorsom, 1994)

- CDE,. Grupo de Música Contemporânea de Lisboa - "Lisbon Contemporary Music Group", led by / dir. Jorge Peixinho.

LP: Sassetti, 1974 (reed. CD: Strauss, 1995)

- Elegia a Amílcar Cabral, electronic music.

LP: Sassetti, 1978 (reed. CD: Strauss-PortugalSom, 1997)

- As Quatro Estações "Four Seasons". Grupo de Música Contemporânea de Lisboa - "Lisbon Contemporary Music Group",

led by / dir. Carlos Franco. LP: Sassetti, 1982 (reed. CD: PortugalSom, 1991)

- Music of Portugal, series of 20 LPs, 2nd subset of 5, LPs 4106, 4109 (including - Sucessões Simétricas I, Episódios).

Fernando Laires, piano; Manhattan String Quartet. Educo (USA), [1984]

- Koellreutter (includes Greetings für Koellreutters), Grupo Juntos Música Nova.

LP: Fundação Nacional de Arte/ Memória Musical Brasileira - "National Foundation for Art/ Brazilian Music Heritage", 1985.

- Música Portuguesa Contemporânea – Obras para guitarra "Contemporary Portuguese Music - Guitar Works"

(includes L'Oiseau-Lyre). José Lopes e Silva, guitar. LP: PortugalSom, 1985 (reed. CD, 1995)

- Daniel Kientzy (includes Sax-Blue). Daniel Kientzy, saxophone.

LP: Poly, 1988.

Jorge Peixinho:

- Sobreposições, Políptico 1960, Sucessões Simétricas II, As Quatro Estações.

Orquestra Sinfónica de Budapeste/ GMCL. CD: PortugalSom, 1991.

- Música Portuguesa Contemporânea – Obras para clarinete "Contemporary Portuguese Music - Clarinet Works"

(includes - O novo canto da Sibila). António Saiote, clarinet. CD Strauss-PortugalSom, 1995.

Jorge Peixinho:

- Concerto para saxofone alto e orquestra "Concerto for Alto Saxophone and Orchestra",

includes - Sax-blue, Passage intérieur, Fantasia-Impromptu. Daniel Kientzy, saxofones /Filarmonica Transilvania et al., CD: Nova Musica, 1996

- Música Portuguesa – Séc. XX "Portuguese Music - XXth Century"

(includes - 'À flor das águas verdes' and 'Nocturno no Cabo do Mundo'), Grupo de Música Vocal Contemporânea "Contemporary Vocal Group", (led by) dir. Mário Mateus /Jorge Peixinho, Francisco Monteiro e Jaime Mota, pianos 2CD: Numérica, 1996

- Lov (includes - Lov II). Trio Lov.

CD: AM&M, 2002

- Jorge Peixinho: – Música para piano.

Miguel Borges Coelho, piano. 2CD: Numérica, 2005

== Bibliography (selective list) ==
by Jorge Peixinho:

- "Música e Notação" (separata de Poesia Experimental-2, Lisbon: Cadernos de Hoje), 1966
- «Canto de amor e de morte. Introdução a um ensaio de interpretação morfológica» in III Ciclo de Cultura Musical: Fernando Lopes-Graça. Associação Académica da Faculdade de Direito de Lisboa/ Agência da J.M.P., 1966.
- "Música sem fantástico ou música arte-fantástica?", in O Fantástico na Arte Contemporânea, Lisbon: Gulbenkian, 1992, pp. 219–22
- «Lopes-Graça: nova luz sobre uma figura ímpar da cultura portuguesa» in 'Uma homenagem a Fernando Lopes-Graça', Matosinhos, Edições Afrontamento/Câmara Municipal de Matosinhos - Matosinhos City Hall, 1995, pp. 6–15

about Jorge Peixinho:

- Estes sons, esta linguagem, by Mário Vieira de Carvalho, Lisbon: Estampa, 1978
- A invenção dos sons. Uma panorâmica da composição em Portugal, hoje, by Sérgio Azevedo, Lisbon: Caminho, 1998
- Jorge Peixinho in memoriam, by José Machado (coord.), Lisbon: Caminho, 2002
- Dez compositores portugueses do século XX, by Manuel Pedro Ferreira (coord.), Lisbon: Dom Quixote, 2006
- Música, Estética e Sociedade nos escritos de Jorge Peixinho, by Cristina Teixeira, Lisboa: Colibri, 2006
