= Jacques Larocque =

Canadian musician

- Born: Canada
- Education: Conservatoire de musique du Québec à Montréal; Conservatoire de Paris
- Occupations: Saxophonist; arranger; music educator; university administrator
- Years active: 1971–present
- Employers: Université du Québec à Trois-Rivières; Conservatoire de musique du Québec à Trois-Rivières
- Style: Classical
- Awards: Prix d'Europe
- Musical career
- Member of: Septune; Saxophone Andran; Zeugma; Saxium Saxophone Quartet
- Formerly of: Pierre Bourque Saxophone Quartet

Jacques Larocque is a Canadian saxophonist, arranger, music educator, and university administrator. He has authored and published numerous transcriptions and arrangements for saxophone quartet, some of which have been recorded by ensembles like the Alliage Saxophone Quartet and the American Saxophone Quartet. He has appeared numerous times on CBC Radio as a soloist and chamber musician and has been a soloist with the Montreal Symphony Orchestra, the Quebec Symphony Orchestra and the Orchestre symphonique de Trois-Rivières, among others.

Larocque studied the saxophone at the Conservatoire de musique du Québec à Montréal with Arthur Romano and Pierre Bourque. In 1967, he was awarded the Prix d'Europe and, to date, is the only saxophonist to have received that honour. That prize enabled him to pursue further studies at the Conservatoire de Paris in France.

After returning to Canada, Larocque became a member of the renowned Pierre Bourque Saxophone Quartet in 1971, with whom he spent the next several years touring internationally and recording. From 1971 to 1990, he served as the director of the Module de musique program at the Université du Québec à Trois-Rivières. He has since taught on the music faculty at the Conservatoire de musique du Québec à Trois-Rivières. In 1995, he founded the saxophone septet Septune, of which he remains artistic director. He is also the current music director of both Saxophone Andran and the trio Zeugma, and is a member of the Saxium Saxophone Quartet.
