= Fritz Münch =

Fritz Münch (born in Strasbourg, then in the German Empire, 2 June 1890, died in Niederbronn-les-Bains 10 March 1970) was a French music administrator and conductor, as well as being a pastor.

== Life and career ==
Born Ernest Frédéric Münch, he was the fourth child and second son of organist and conductor Ernst Münch and his wife Célestine. His younger brother Charles became a renowned conductor, and his cousin was the conductor Hans Münch.

He was the cellist among the children, described as “purposeful, studious, given to sobriety of dress and the bespectacled look”. He was sent to Paris for a year to improve his French (the home language was Alsatian, but German was used at school and French with his mother), and he began his studies at the Strasbourg Conservatory. He then pursued further studies in music and theology in Leipzig, Berlin, and Paris.

Münch then joined the faculty of the Strasbourg Conservatory as a professor of music history, and eventually succeeded his father as the school's director in 1929, in which post he continued until he retired in 1960. As director he introduced classes in orchestral and choral conducting which he himself ran, and among his other teaching innovations were introducing tuition in saxophone and the use of the gramophone in classes. With the intent of ensuring that students were good teachers as well as performers he also created a course in musical pedagogy in 1934. One of his notable students was Ernest Bour.

He succeeded his father as the conductor of the lauded Chœur Saint-Guillaume at Saint William's Church, Strasbourg in 1924. During this period he programmed works such as Haydn's The Seasons, the Mozart Requiem (with which he inaugurated Radio Strasbourg on 11 November 1930), and among contemporary composers, he conducted Debussy, Schmitt, Stravinsky and especially Honegger. He conducted the premieres in Strasbourg of the Ode of Nicolas Nabokov in 1931, the Abendkantate of Léon Justin Kauffmann in 1942 and the Stabat Mater of Poulenc in 1951. He ended his career with the choir in 1962 with the St Matthew Passion in Strasbourg and Les Cris du Monde and the Symphonie Liturgique by Honegger at the Festival of Zurich.

He made several recordings, including Bach and Honegger, and radio appearances.

Münch was also the director of the municipal concerts in Strasbourg from 1945–49, and of the Institute of Musicology (1949-1958).

On 25 September 1944 the conservatoire building was hit by an allied bomb; Fritz had got members of his family and students to escape the air-raid by going in the concert room but his wife and two of his children were killed there when it was hit.

== Sources ==
- Fritz Münch at www.bach-cantatas.com
