= Ernst Münch (musician) =

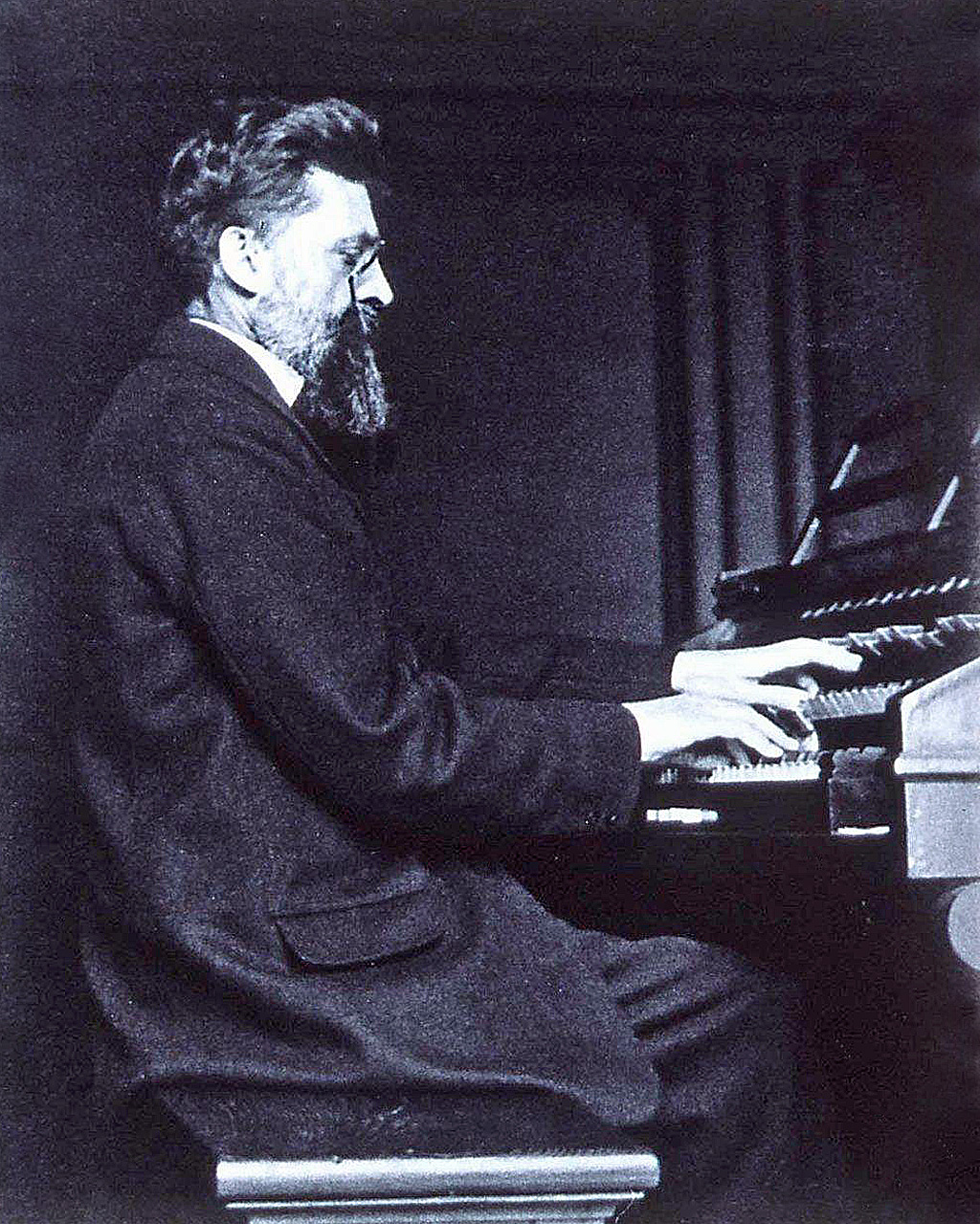
Ernst Münch

Ernst Münch (31 December 1859 in Niederbronn-les-Bains – 1928) was an Alsatian organist and choir conductor.

Münch taught organ at the Strasbourg Conservatory where his pupils included Joseph Müller-Blattau, Heinrich Boell, and Adolf Hamm. For many years he was the organist/choirmaster at Saint William's Church, Strasbourg. There he founded the Wilhelmer Choir. which under his leadership became highly known for their performances of the works of Johann Sebastian Bach.

Münch was the brother of conductor Eugen Münch and uncle of conductor and composer Hans Münch. His son Charles Munch was a famous symphonic conductor and violinist who had a long association with the Boston Symphony Orchestra. His daughter Emma married Paul Schweitzer, Albert Schweitzer's brother. His son Fritz Münch succeeded him as conductor of the Wilhelmer Choir and was director of the Strasbourg Conservatory for several years.

== Sources ==
- Albert Schweitzer: Memories of Ernst Münch (1945). In: Essays on Music, ed. Stefan Hanheide, Bärenreiter-Verlag, Kassel and Basel, 1988, ISBN 3-7618-0920-4, p. 185-194.
