= St William's Church, Strasbourg =

Coordinates: 48°34′55.5″N 7°45′28″E

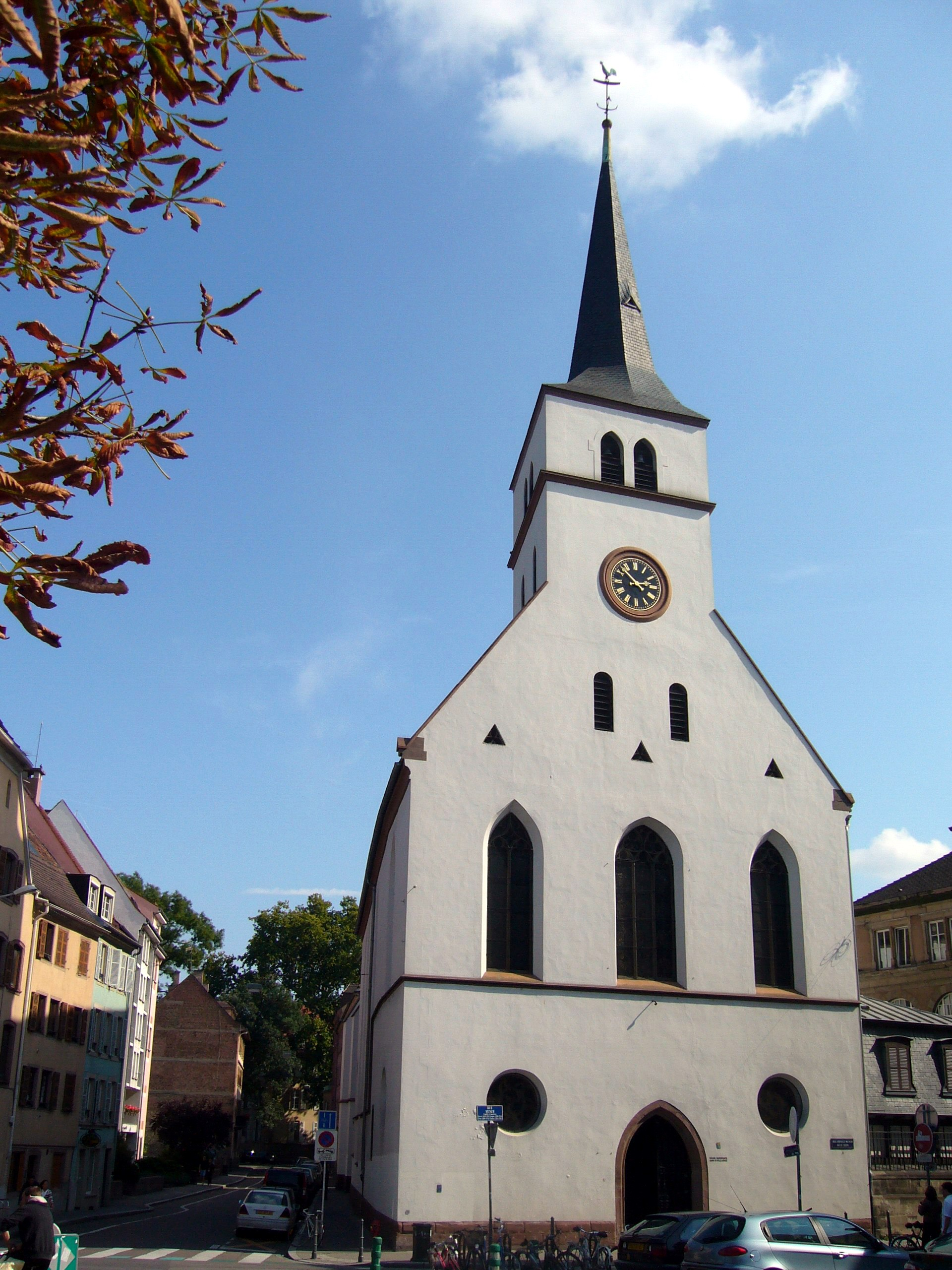
Saint William's façade and bell tower

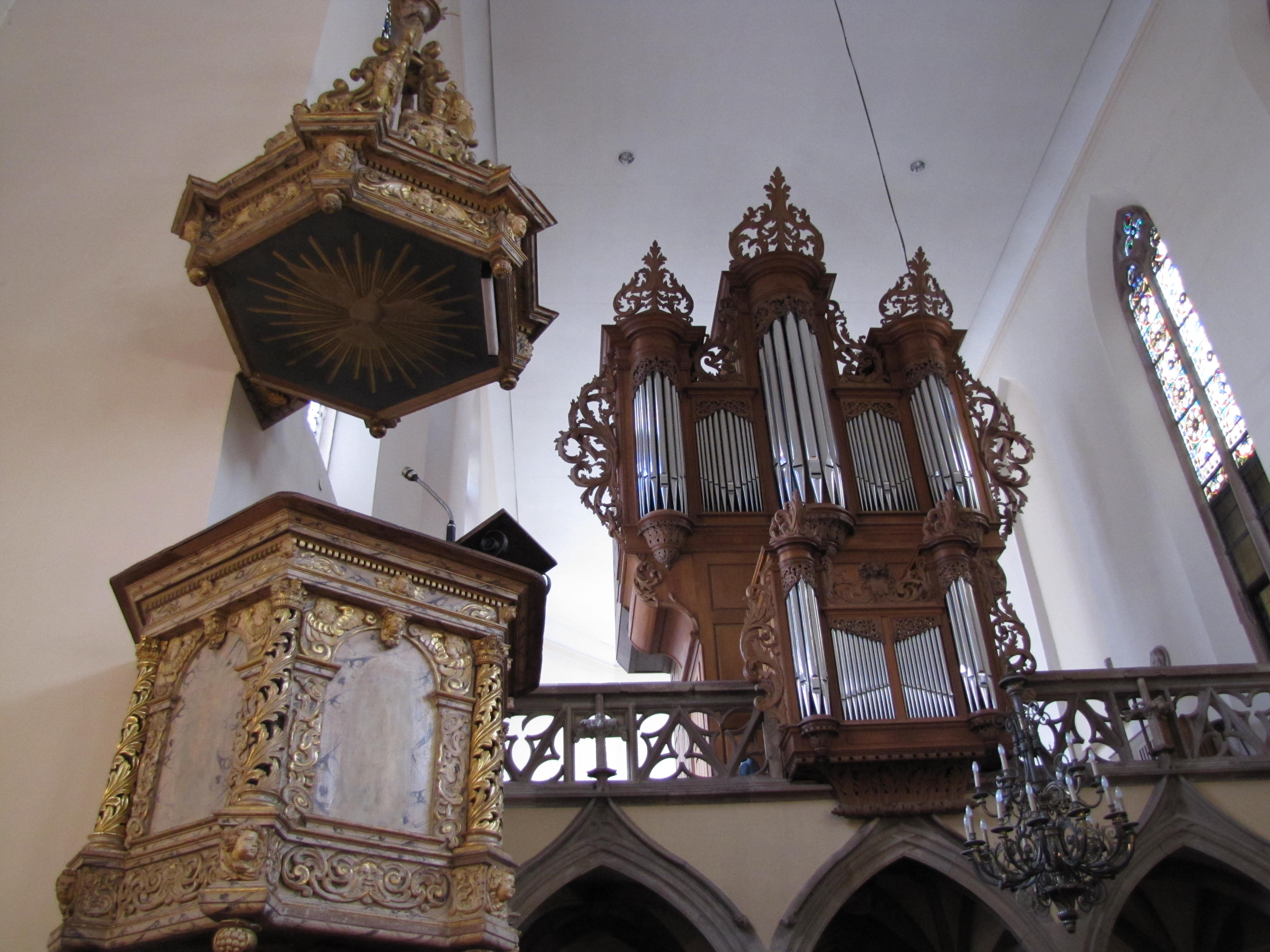
Saint William's pulpit and pipe organ

Saint William's Church (also called Wilhelmskirche in German and église Saint-Guillaume in French) is a Gothic church presently of the Lutheran Protestant Church of Augsburg Confession of Alsace and Lorraine located in Strasbourg, France. Slightly set back from the intersection of the wharfs of the shipbuilders and the fishermen, the church is striking for its picturesque location on the bank of the Ill river, the lopsided character of its exterior, and its sumptuous interior combining the Gothic and Baroque styles.

Since the end of the 19th century, the excellent acoustics of the church has allowed it to serve as a venue for concerts of classical music, in particular for the Passions of Johann Sebastian Bach.

== History of the Saint William's Church ==
=== Catholic period ===
Returning unharmed from the Crusades, the knight Henri de Müllenheim undertook the construction of a monastery for the Hermits of Saint William, an order of mendicant monks, in this marshy neighbourhood situated extra muros, that is, beyond the city walls. The elongated building, consecrated in 1301 and realised in 1307, is the only remnant of this group. Entirely brick and unvaulted, the church corresponds well to the ideal of the order, namely by its single nave and the simplicity of its exterior form. Sheltered by a pitched roof, its nave is topped and prolonged by a deep polygonal choir illuminated by high windows, which betrays its original function as the monks' meeting room. In 1331, by reason of its proximity to the port and wharfs, the church was chosen as parish by the newly established corporation of shipbuilders.

=== Lutheran period ===
The convent closed however, during the less than prosperous 15th century, before the reform movement arrived at the end of the century.

The Church, including the Rood screen was classified a Monument historique in 1985.

== The Wilhelmer Choir ==
Founded in 1885 by the organist Ernst Münch (1859–1928) the Wilhelmer Choir, also known as the 'Chœur de Saint-Guillaume' has established itself as one of the leading choirs of the region. It has been led by several famous choirmasters, including Wilhelm Furtwangler, John Eliot Gardiner and Charles and Fritz Munch the sons of the founder of the choir.
