= Boris Porena =

Italian composer (1927–2022)

Boris Porena (Rome, 27 September 1927 - Cantalupo in Sabina, 3 May 2022) was an Italian thinker, music composer and didactical expert. He was married to Paola Bučan, a famous Croatian cellist and teacher who, until her retirement in 2014 was a tenured professor at the Conservatorio di Musica in Perugia (Italy).

He was a disciple of Goffredo Petrassi – alongside other distinguished musicians such as Ennio Morricone, Aldo Clementi, and Sergio Cafaro. Although he was initially influenced by neoclassical poetics, he later evolved towards the use of the harmonic language of the late Renaissance period, which he has used with originality in order to build his own musical research which directly influenced his later compositional processes.

He started composing when only 12 years old. His career is effectively in two distinct and different periods – the first being up until 1967 during which time he gained a wide national and international success. From 1968, as consequence of the evolution of both his thought and his social involvement, he abstained from composing, a period which lasted for the next twenty years. During that time he devoted himself to a grassroots cultural practice and set up the Metacultural Centre, located at Cantalupo in Sabina (Rieti, Italy). In 1988 he began to compose again with renewed enthusiasm, starting on a new and different compositional phase.

As a musical critic he has written essays about his master, Goffredo Petrassi along with several other important texts about music; among them Musica/Società (Einaudi, 1975) stands out, going beyond purely musical issues and authoritatively examines and explores the fields of social and political analysis.

He has taught new didactics of composition at the Santa Cecilia Conservatory in Rome and he has been director of the Research and Experimental Centre "Musica in Sabina". Among his many disciples are Jesús Villa-Rojo, Luca Lombardi, Celestino Dionisi, Giuliano d'Angiolini, Derek Healey, James Clifford Brown, Claudio Pietro, Jorge (Manuel Rosado Marques) Peixinho, Armando Santiago, Oliver Wehlmann, Monica Conversano [composer], Massimo Fornetti, Alessandro De Rosa, Emanuele Pappalardo and many more.

His non compositional writings cover a number of other fields, especially pedagogy and grassroots didactics, but also philosophical reflections such as those expressed in "Metacultural Hypothesis: an hypothesis for survival" (1999).

He has a considerable and deep-seated interest in natural sciences which have led him to becoming something of an authority in entomology and especially in coleopterology.

He has written a rich collection of poetry, especially in German, his mother tongue.

== The Hypothesis ==
His deep interest in the global problems affecting contemporary society have led Boris Porena, together with the Metacultural Centre, to formulate the Metacultural Hypothesis (MCH), also known as "the Hypothesis".

This Hypothesis has known several formulations.

For example:

(Formulation 1) Every one of our acts or thoughts, being a possible communication object, has in itself a cultural component which must be relativised with regard to the culture which has produced it.

But also:

(Formulation 2) MCH coincides with the interruption of the principle of non contradiction.

And even in a third form:

(Formulation 3) Given any proposition p, it is always possible either to find or to build a local cultural universe LCU_{p} within which p becomes 'true'

== Writings ==
- Kinder-Musik (1973)
- Musical Inquisitions (1974)
- Music-Society. Musical Inquisitions II (1975)
- Music in Compulsory Schooling (5 volumes) (1975–1978)
- Musica Prima. Musical composition: a tool for grassroots cultural practice at the school and in the territory (1979)
- Lake of Reflected Stories (1984)
- New Music Didactics (review and technical comments by Paola Bučan) (1988)
  - N.1 for Piano – An itinerary for the first three years of study
  - N.2 for Composition – Grammatical and Syntactical Issues
  - N.3 Music by ... do, listen, learn, discuss. For the middle school and beyond
  - N.4 for Cello – An itinerary towards professional activity
- Metacultural Hypothesis: an hypothesis for composing differences, i.e. for survival (1999).
- About Composition. Metacultural reflection addressed to musicians, professionals and amateurs. (1998)
- From knowing to thinking. For the sake of a truly renewed elementary school (2003)

== Biography ==
- Giorgio De Martino, 'L'utopia possibile. Vita, Musica e filosofia di Boris Porena, (2004), 364 pages plus photographies, Zecchini Editore, Varese

== Musical works ==
His rich musical production, which comprises hundreds of works, has been accurately catalogued by Prof. Patrizia Conti (see 'L'Utopia possibile). The following works should be particularly notable:

- Sonatina "Vive la France!" (piano) (1951)
- Three sacred pieces . Liturgical text (1. Kyrie 2. Sanctus 3. Agnus Dei) (1954)
- Vier klassische Lieder (soprano, piano) 1. Die Zerstörung Magdeburgs, 2. St. NepomuksVorabend, 3. Schneider-Courage, 4. Die wandelnde Glocke (1956)
- Der Gott und die Bayadere (baritone, soprano, choir, two flutes, two oboes, two clarinets, 2 bassoons, four trumpets, strings) (1957)
- Vier kanonische Lieder (soprano, clarinet) 1. Fernen 2. Auge der Zeit 3. Ich weiss 4. Der uns die Stunden zählte (1958)
- Drei Lieder (bass, 3 trombones – or 3 cellos) 1. Im Osten 2. Klage 3. Der Schlaf (originating also other Trakl-Lieder) (1959–1960)
- Eine Gryphius-Kantate (Baroque cantata) (1961)
- Music for orchestra N.1, (three flutes, three oboes, three clarinets, two bassoons, three horns, three trumpets, three trombones, percussions, strings) (1963)
- Über aller dieser deiner Trauer. Passio judaica (1965)
- Sei Ländler (in memoriam of Serapione) – Musical Inquisitions (piano) (1970)
- Suite N. 1 Benjamin Britten (cello solo) Prima (1981)
- Sonata quasi una parodia (Beethoven opus 109) (piano) (1987)
- Traumwirrnis (Schumann) (piano) (1987)
- Claude ... déchiré (Debussy) (piano) (1987)
- Trio N. 1 Felix (violin, cello, piano) (1987)
- Vivaldi (four concertant violins, strings) (1988)
- Satura for Bruno (flute, clarinet, violin, cello, piano) (1991)
- About the more and the less (second version) Dialogue for cello solo (1992)
- Wir. Scenic action in three acts plus an intermezzo (1993–1995)
- Euphorion. Szene für einen Goetheabend (1997)
- Bauhaus-Symphonie (Symphony N. 4), 1. Punkte, Linien, Flächen, Farben, 2. Linie, auf Abenteuer aus, 3. Gebrauchssinfonietta, 4. Räume (1997)
- Eight preludes for cello solo (1999)
- Eine weltliche Passion. Passio mundana (2000)
- Quartet N. 4 (1. Figurale monodico, 2. Afigurale I, 3. Figurale armonico (corale variato), 4. Afigurale II, 5. Figurale contrappuntistico (Fuga prima), 6. Afigurale III (Fuga seconda)) (2000)
- Suite 2000 (Suite of suites) (2000)
  - I serie Preludio Menuetto Sarabanda Gavotta Bourrée Pavana Giga
  - II serie Valzer Polka Tango Samba Ragtime Rock I Rock II Passacaglia
  - III serie estampida Girotondo Canzone a Ballo Ritmo indiano Danza dell'anitra Danza rituale Tarantella)
