= Conservatoire de musique du Québec à Saguenay =

Coordinates: 48°25′34.87″N 71°3′45.09″W

- Abbreviation: CMQS
- Formation: 1968
- Type: Conservatory
- Legal status: active
- Purpose: Professional training in music
- Location(s): 202, rue Jacques-Cartier Est; Saguenay, Quebec; G7H 6R8
- Region served: Saguenay, Quebec
- Official language: French
- Director: Régis Rousseau
- Parent organization: Conservatoire de musique et d'art dramatique du Québec
- Website: www.conservatoire.gouv.qc.ca

The Conservatoire de musique du Québec à Saguenay is a music conservatory located in Saguenay, Quebec, Canada. The conservatory was opened in 1967 and is part of a network of 9 conservatories in Quebec, the Conservatoire de musique et d'art dramatique du Québec (CMADQ), and was the seventh school in the CMADQ network to be established. Approximately 85 pupils are enrolled at the conservatory. Pierre Bourque served as the school's director in 1972–1973.
