= Österreichische Musikzeitschrift =

Defunct monthly Austrian music magazine

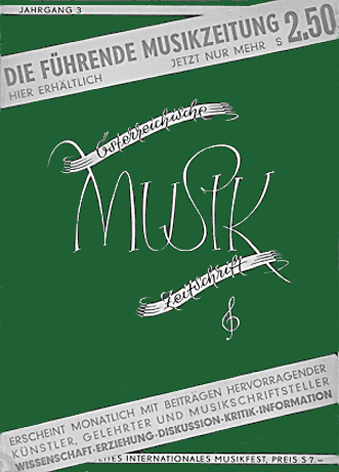
- Cover, January 1948
- Editor: Marion Diederichs-Lafite
- Former editors: Peter Lafite
- Categories: Classical music magazine
- Frequency: Monthly
- Publisher: Musikzeit, Böhlau Verlag, Hollitzer
- First issue: 1945
- Final issue: February 2018
- Country: Austria
- Based in: Vienna
- Language: German
- ISSN: 0029-9316
- OCLC: 610398019

The Österreichische Musikzeitschrift (ÖMZ, Austrian music magazine) was a monthly music magazine published in Vienna, Austria, by Verlag Musikzeit. It was established in 1945 by the Austrian cultural politician and music critic Peter Lafite. It appeared until the end of 2010, edited by Marion Diederichs-Lafite with 745 issues. From 2011 to 2014, the magazine was published by Böhlau Verlag. From 2015 to the last edition in February 2018 it was published by Hollitzer.
