= Conservatoire de musique et d'art dramatique du Québec =

Conservatory

Coordinates: 46.80382°N 71.22060°W

- Abbreviation: CMADQ
- Formation: 1943
- Type: Public corporation
- Legal status: active
- Purpose: Professional training in music and dramatic arts
- Headquarters: Quebec City, Quebec
- Region served: Quebec, Canada
- Official language: French
- Director general: Nathalie Letendre
- Affiliations: European Association of Conservatoires
- Website: http://www.conservatoire.gouv.qc.ca

The Conservatoire de musique et d'art dramatique du Québec (French pronunciation: [kɔ̃sɛʁvatwaʁ də myzik e daʁ dʁamatik dy kebɛk], CMADQ) is a public network of nine state-subsidised schools offering higher education in music and theatre in Quebec, Canada. The organization was established in 1942 as a branch of the Ministère des Affaires culturelles du Québec by the government of Quebec during the premiership of Maurice Duplessis. Orchestra conductor Wilfrid Pelletier and composer Claude Champagne are credited for their zeal in promoting this project, and the two men led the organization as director and assistant director for its first several years. The organization's current director general is Nathalie Letendre.

The first two conservatoires in the CMADQ network were for music and were established in Montreal in 1943 and Quebec City in 1944. During the 1950s the organization founded additional schools for the theatre arts in both those cities, followed by four additional music conservatoires in 1967 in Chicoutimi, Hull, Trois-Rivières, and Val-d'Or. The seventh and last school for music to be added was in Rimouski in 1973. Many of Canada's most successful musicians and artists of the theatre of the 20th and 21st centuries have been trained or taught at these schools.

== History ==
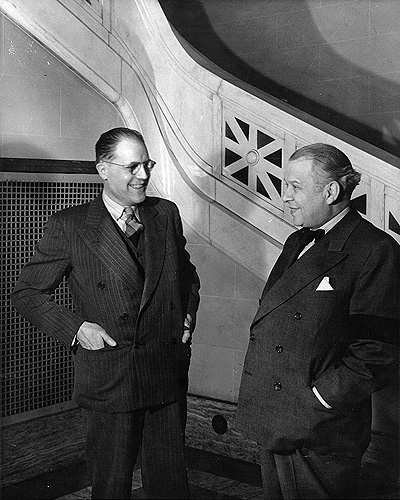
Claude Champagne (left) and Wilfrid Pelletier (right) at the opening of the Conservatoire de musique du Québec à Montréal in 1943.

During the late 1930s and early 1940s, Canadian composer Claude Champagne put together a large report on music education. This report was presented to the Quebec government by Champagne and conductor Wilfrid Pelletier with the hopes of establishing Canadian institutes of higher learning for music. The report closely examined music education in Europe as well as in Canada and plans were soon formed to establish a network of state-subsidized schools which would be modelled after European conservatoires, particularly the Conservatoire de Paris. On 29 May 1942 The Conservatory Act ('Loi du conservatoire') was passed by the Legislative Assembly of Quebec, which allocated a $30,000 budget to form the CMADQ's first school, the Conservatoire de musique du Québec à Montréal (CMQM). The CMQM opened its doors in January 1943 with its first round of courses, which were held at the Saint-Sulpice Library. Pelletier was the school's first director and Champagne the first assistant director.

With the successful opening of the CMQM, the CMADQ, under Pelletier's leadership, began plans to establish a similar conservatoire in Quebec City, the Conservatoire de musique du Québec à Québec. These plans were swiftly carried out and the school's first day of classes occurred on 17 January 1944 with Pelletier also serving as this school's first director. Most of the conservatoire's original faculty were also teachers at the CMQM and commuted back and forth between the two schools during its early years.

Originally the CMADQ was only concerned with musical education, but Pelletier felt that Quebec needed conservatoires for studies in theatre as well. He proposed the idea to the Quebec government and was met with resistance. However, he won the ear of Premier Maurice Duplessis and ultimately his influence led to the establishment of the CMADQ's first school for the theatre arts, the Conservatoire d'art dramatique du Québec à Montréal in 1954 under the directorship of Jan Doat. The establishment of the Conservatoire d'art dramatique du Québec à Québec followed four years later.

The CMADQ went on to establish four more music conservatoires in 1967. The Conservatoire de musique du Québec à Trois-Rivières was originally established as a preparatory school for conservatoire bound students in 1964. It became a full-fledged conservatoire in the CMADQ network in 1967. The Conservatoire de musique du Québec à Val-d'Or opened in September 1967 and the Conservatoire de musique du Québec à Gatineau was opened on 15 October 1967 followed by the Conservatoire de musique du Québec à Saguenay on 16 October 1967. The last conservatoire to be added to the CMADQ, the Conservatoire de musique du Québec à Rimouski, opened in 1973.

== Member schools ==
The conservatoire consists of seven music schools and two theatre schools:

- Conservatoire de musique du Québec à Gatineau (housed in Riverview manor)
- Conservatoire de musique du Québec à Montréal
- Conservatoire de musique du Québec à Québec
- Conservatoire de musique du Québec à Rimouski
- Conservatoire de musique du Québec à Saguenay
- Conservatoire de musique du Québec à Trois-Rivières
- Conservatoire de musique du Québec à Val-d'Or
- Conservatoire d'art dramatique de Montréal
- Conservatoire d'art dramatique de Québec
