= Conservatoire de musique du Québec à Trois-Rivières =

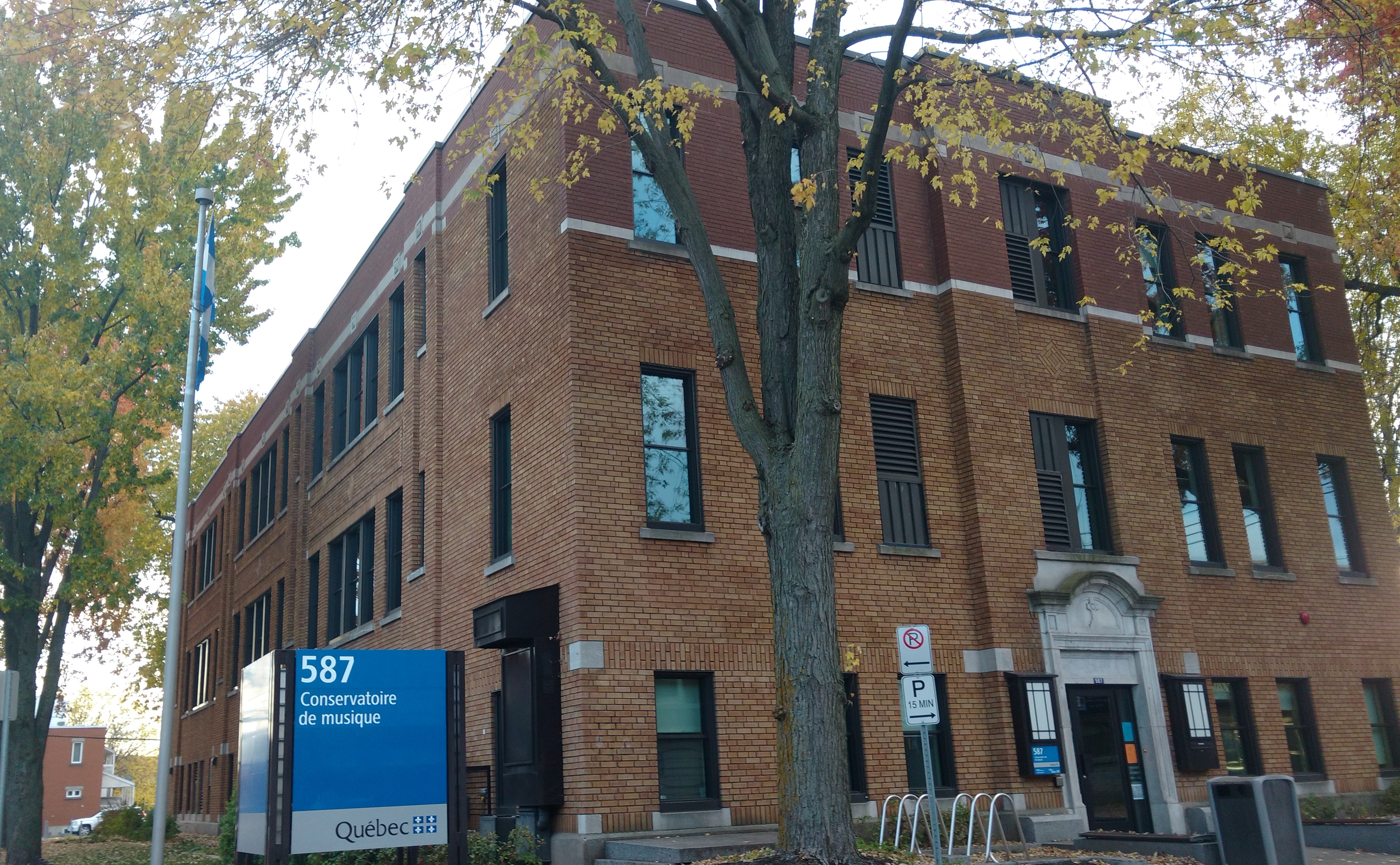
- Conservatoire de Musique de Trois-Rivières, Quebec, Canada
- Abbreviation: CMQT
- Formation: 1964
- Type: Conservatory
- Legal status: active
- Purpose: Professional training in music
- Location(s): 587, rue Radisson; Trois-Rivières, Quebec; G9A 2C8
- Coordinates: 46.3436°N 72.5463°W
- Region served: Trois-Rivières, Quebec
- Official language: French
- Director: Louis Dallaire
- Parent organization: Conservatoire de musique et d'art dramatique du Québec
- Website: https://www.conservatoire.gouv.qc.ca

The Conservatoire de musique du Québec à Trois-Rivières (CMQT) is a music conservatory located in Trois-Rivières, Quebec, Canada. Most of the school's students come from the Saint-Maurice region of Quebec; many of them from the conservatoire preparatory programs at the school of St-Gabriel du Cap-de-la-Madeleine and the comprehensive school Ste-Ursule de Trois-Rivières. The CMQT was originally located on Laviolette St, but in 1970 the school moved to better facilities in the building of the Centre culturel and the former École Ste-Marie. The conservatoire moved to its present location on Radisson Street in October 1978.

== History ==
Founded by pianist Czeslaw Kaczynski in 1964, the CMQT became an entirely state-subsidized institution by the Quebec government in 1967. The conservatoire is part of a network of 9 conservatories in Quebec, the Conservatoire de musique et d'art dramatique du Québec (CMADQ), and was the third school in the CMADQ network to be established. Kaczynski served as the school's first director until 1970. The current director is Louis Dallaire.

The CMQT was originally a pre-college preparatory school which was established by Kaczynski in 1964, opening for its first day of classes on 1 April 1964. Exactly three years later to the day, the school became a full-fledged conservatory with a college program and became a member school of the CMADQ. Kaczynski continued to lead the school through 1970, leading a staff whose members included Gaston Arel (music theory), Otto Armin (violin), Hervé Baillargeon (flute), Raymond Daveluy (harmony/counterpoint), Réal Gagnier (oboe), Stephen Kondaks (viola), Rafael Masella (clarinet), Élisabeth Miquel (piano and piano accompaniment), Bernard Piché (organ and theoretical subjects), Antoine Reboulot (piano) and Charles Reiner (piano and piano accompaniment).

Originally the CMQT only offered instruction in instrumental music, with Jean Deslauriers serving as the school's first orchestra director. Raymond Daveluy succeeded Kaczynski as the school's director in 1970, remaining there as director until 1974 when he was succeeded by Armando Santiago. However, Daveluy remained a member of the faculty for several years after he stepped down as director. A vocal music program with classes in singing was established in 1974 by Jacqueline Martel, eventually growing to include studies in opera and choral music. Some of the teaching staff appointed to the school during the 1970s included clarinetist Jean Laurendeau, horn player Joseph Masella, oboist Bernard Jean; organist Noëlla Genest; pianists Michel Dussault, Christiane Sénart, Nadia Strycek, and Denise Trudel-Bellemare; saxophonist Jacques Larocque; and trombonist Joseph Zuskin. Michelle Quintal taught theoretical subjects at the school and Gilles Bellemare was the school's main instructor in harmony and counterpoint.

More recent directors of the CMQT include Georges Savaria (1979–1980), Roger Bédard (1980–1982), Jean Charron (1982–1986), Michel Kozlovsky (1986–1991), and Pierre Normandin (1991–2009). The school is currently led by director Louis Dallaire who was appointed in 2009.

== Notable alumni ==
- Suzanne Beaubien, pianist
- Pierre Beaudry, trombonist
- Marie Bédard, violinist
- Pierre-Michel Bédard, organist and composer
- Gilles Bellemare, conductor and composer
- Marie-Andrée Benny, flautist
- Jean-Michel Blais, pianist
- Danièle Bourget, flautist
- Valérie Milot, Harpist
- Murielle Bruneau, double bass player
- Gilles Carpentier, clarinetist
- Claudine Côté, opera singer
- Marie Gélinas, cellist
- Sylvie Lambert, cellist
- Louise Pellerin, oboist
- Denise Trudel, pianist
- Louise Trudel, cellist
- Claude Grenier, Harmony, Contrepoint and Fugue
