= Armando Santiago =

Canadian composer (1932–2025)

Armando Santiago (18 June 1932 – 9 September 2025) was a Portuguese-born Canadian composer, conductor, music educator and university administrator. A member of the Canadian League of Composers, his compositional output includes a considerable amount of orchestral works and chamber works. From 1974 to 1978 he was the director of the Conservatoire de musique du Québec à Trois-Rivières and from 1978 to 1985 he was the director of the Conservatoire de musique du Québec à Québec.

== Early life and education ==
Born in Lisbon on 18 June 1932, Santiago became a naturalized Canadian citizen in 1972. He studied singing and piano privately in his native city before entering the Lisbon Conservatory where he earned a premier prix in music history (1954) and music composition (1960). He then studied the techniques of musique concrète with Pierre Schaeffer through the research service of the Office de Radiodiffusion Télévision Française in Paris in 1960. From 1962 to 1964 he studied in Rome with Boris Porena privately and with Goffredo Petrassi at the Accademia Nazionale di Santa Cecilia through grants awarded to him by the governments of Portugal and Italy. He obtained an advanced studies diploma in music composition from the Accademia in 1964. He also pursued studies in conducting with Hans Münch in Lisbon and Franco Ferrara in Siena.

== Career ==
Santiago taught classes in music theory, composition, and conducting in Lisbon during the 1960s. He emigrated to Canada in 1968 to join the music faculty at the Conservatoire de musique du Québec à Trois-Rivières. He became the director of that school in 1974, and founded its orchestra. In 1978 he was appointed director of the Conservatoire de musique du Québec à Québec. Among his notable pupils are Pierre-Michel Bédard and Gilles Bellemare.

In 1977–1978 Santiago conducted performances of his compositions played by the CBC Quebec Chamber Orchestra. He has also worked as a guest conductor with orchestras in Portugal, Germany, and Canada during the 1970s and 1980s.

A theatre at the Conservatoire de musique du Québec à Trois-Rivières is named for him.

== Death ==
Santiago died on 9 September 2025, at the age of 93.

== Compositions ==
Some of Santiago's more well known compositions are Suite for bassoon and piano (1960), Soneto de Camões for baritone and string orchestra (1966), Sinfonia (1966, written for the Jeunesses musicales du Canada), Sonata (1968, commissioned by the University of Lisbon), Simetrias (1970), Prismes (1970), Heterogenia-Movimento per 32 solisti (1971, commissioned by the Gulbenkian Foundation of Lisbon), Requies for male choir and 25 instruments (1979–83), Undecassônia (1975) and Trame (1985–9) for orchestra, and Musique pour quatre (1988). In 1962 he composed the film score for Ernesto de Sousa's Dom Roberto.

For Orchestra/Large Ensemble:

- (1962) Música para D. Roberto para o filme D. Roberto de Ernesto de Sousa - (1963) Episodi I para Orquestra - (1964) Musica per Orchestra para Orquestra - (1967/71) Heterogenia – Movimento per 32 solisti para Orquestra - (1975) Undecassonia para Orquestra - (1985/9) Trame – fragment un, fragment deux para Orquestra - (1998) Visions de la fin du siècle para Orquestra

Vocal Music / inclunding voices

- (1957) Três Cantigas de D. Dinis para Soprano e Harpa - (1966) Soneto de Camões para Baritono e Orquestra de Câmara - (1970) Prismes para Coro, Contrabaixo, Percussão e Trompa - (1983) Requies para Coro Masculino e Ensemble - (1991) Visions de la fin du siècle para Coro a cappella - (1993) ...un mur impossible... para Coro a cappella

Chamber Music

- (1959) Trio para Piano, Violino e Violoncelo - (1959) Sonata para Flauta e Harpa - (1960) Suite para Fagote e Piano - (1963) Quitetto di Fiati para Quinteto de Sopros - (1966) Sinfonia para Violino, Viola, Violoncelo, Harpa e Percussão - (1968) Sonata 68 para 2 Pianos, Flauta e 2 Percussões - (1970) Simetrias para Flauta, Clarinete, Trompa, Violoncelo, Piano e Percussão - (1973) Piece pour cor et metaux para Trompa e 3 Percussões - (1988) Musique pour quatre para Quartet de Saxofones - (1995) Quatuor à cordes para Quarteto de Cordas - (1998) Neume I para Trio de Cordas - (2000) Neume II para Piano, Violino e Violoncelo

Solo

- (1971) Trois Miniatures para Clarinete - (1973) Pièce pour percussioniste seul para Percussão - (2000) Neume III para Viola - (2000) Groupes II para Piano - (2000) Groupes III para Piano - (2023) Groupes IV para Marimba e Gongos - (2025) Groupes V para Vibrafone e Metais
