= Jean Deslauriers =

Canadian conductor, violinist, and composer

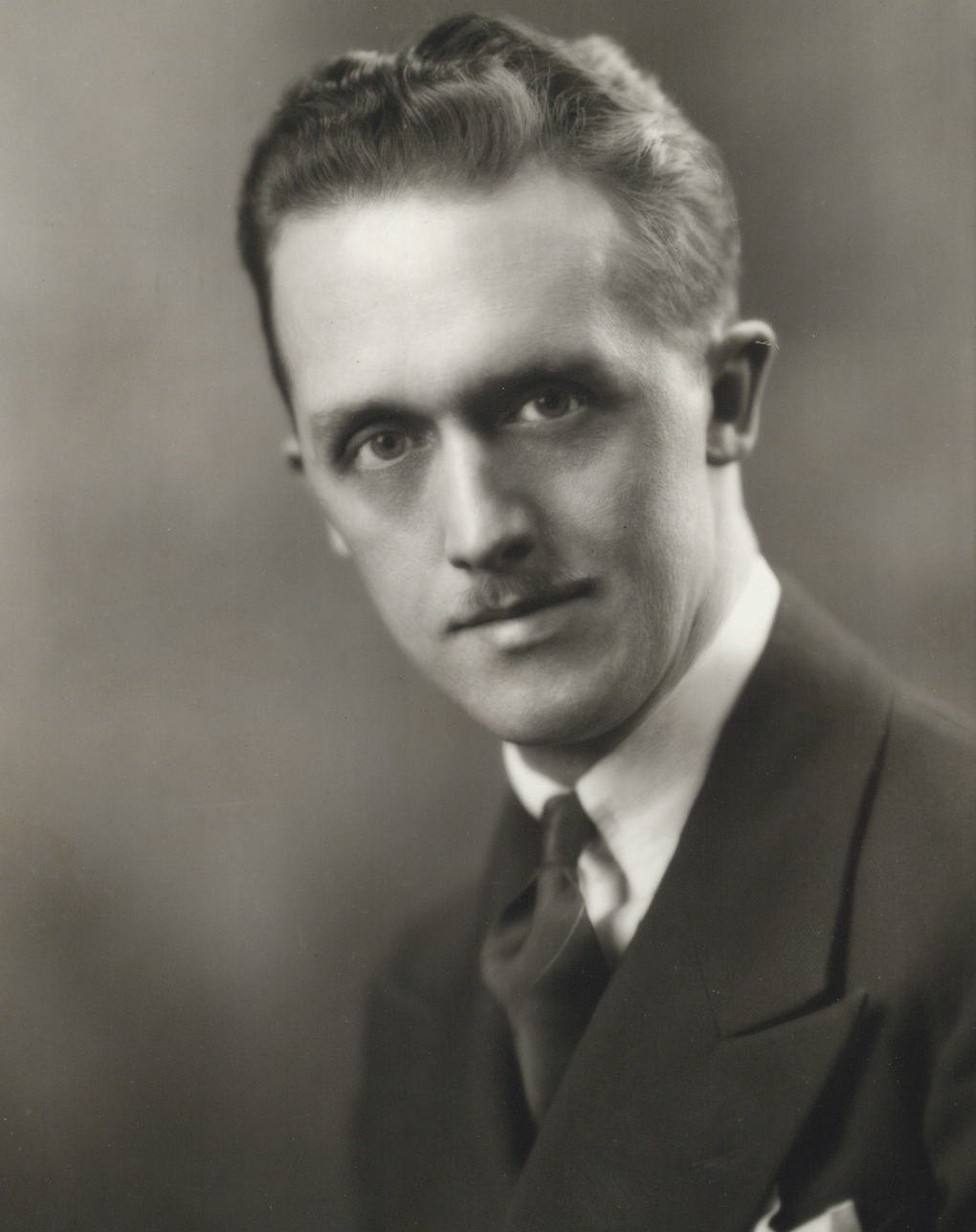
Jean Deslauriers, 1909-1978

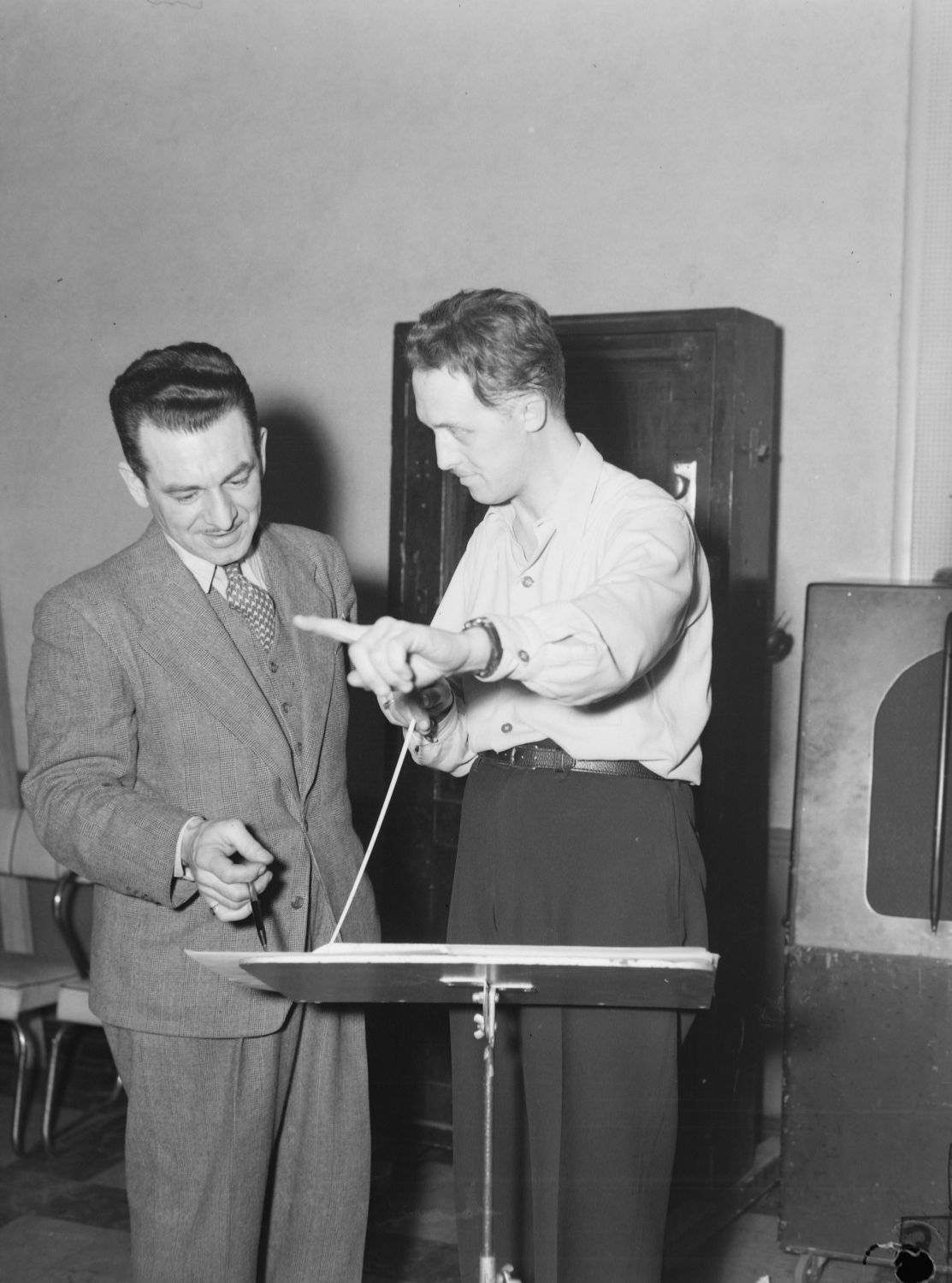
Marcel Henri and Jean Deslauriers, in a CBC studio, Montreal, 1948

Jean Deslauriers (24 June 1909 – 30 May 1978) was a Canadian conductor, violinist, and composer. As a conductor he had a long and fruitful partnership with the Canadian Broadcasting Corporation; conducting orchestras for feature films and television and radio programs for more than 40 years. He also worked as a guest conductor with orchestras and opera companies throughout Canada and served on the conducting staff of the Opéra du Québec. The Canadian Encyclopedia describes him as "a conductor with a sober but efficient technique, who was always faithful to the written score [and] equally at ease conducting concerts, opera, and lighter repertoire." His best-known compositions are his Prélude for strings and the song, La Musique des yeux. He is the father of soprano Yolande Deslauriers-Husaruk.

== Life and career ==
Born in Montreal, Deslauriers was a child prodigy and began his career as a concert violinist as a young teenager. He studied the violin with Émile Taranto and Camille Couture. He notably gave annual concert tours with singers Paul Dufault and Joseph Saucier in Canada and the United States between 1924 and 1929. He also studied with Claude Champagne (orchestration) Auguste Descarries (counterpoint and instrumentation), Romain-Octave Pelletier I (harmony and solfège) between 1918 and 1923. During the early 1930s he worked as a violinist and conductor aboard cruise ships.

In 1935 Deslauriers became a member of the Montreal Symphony Orchestra with whom he played for the next decade. In 1936 he began working for CBC Radio in Montreal as a conductor, conducting orchestras for such programs as Radio-Concerts canadiens, Théâtre lyrique Molson, and Concerts d'opéras among others. As television became a more established medium he also conducted for CBC TV programs like L'Heure du concert, Sérénade, and Concerts populaires. He notably conducted the orchestra for the LaFlèche Trophy Award-winning radio and television program Serenade for Strings from 1937 to 1957. Following World War II he began arranging and conducting the scores for many films for the CBC. In 1954 he conducted one of the first opera broadcasts by CBC TV with a televised version of Gioachino Rossini's The Barber of Seville. He conducted several more opera broadcasts for the CBC, including performances of André Messager's Monsieur Beaucaire (1954), Charles Gounod's Roméo et Juliette (1971) and Giacomo Puccini's Madama Butterfly (1977).

During the 1960s and 1970s Deslauriers was highly active as a guest conductor with symphony orchestras in such Canadian cities as Montreal, Quebec City, Toronto, Ottawa, Halifax, Vancouver, and Winnipeg. He notably conducted the Toronto Symphony Orchestra in the world premiere of Robert Turner's Three Episodes for Orchestra in 1966 and conducted the premiere of François Morel's Prismes-Anamorphoses with the CBC Symphony Orchestra in 1968. He also worked as a conductor for opera productions, notably serving as the music director of the Théâtre lyrique du Québec from 1967 to 1970 and as the assistant conductor of the Opéra du Québec from 1972 to

1975. During the 1970s he worked as a guest conductor for productions with the Canadian Opera Company and the Edmonton Opera. He also taught on the music faculty of the Conservatoire de musique du Québec à Trois-Rivières where he was the first conductor of the school's orchestra.

Having never retired, Deslauriers died in Saint-Jérôme, Quebec in 1978 at the age of 68. Upon his death, his large collection of musical scores was donated to the library at the Conservatoire de musique du Québec à Montréal. His personal papers are part of the collection at the Bibliothèque et Archives nationales du Québec. In 1975 the Montreal concert auditorium Plateau Hall was renamed the Salle Jean-Deslauriers in his honor.
