= Pierre Bourque =

Pierre Bourque may refer to:

- Pierre Bourque (journalist) (1958–2021), former journalist, politician and NASCAR driver from Ottawa, Canada
- Pierre Bourque (politician) (born 1942), businessman and politician in Quebec, Canada; mayor of Montreal, 1994–2001
- Pierre Bourque (saxophonist) (1938–2014), Canadian saxophonist and music educator
