= Gilles Bellemare (composer) =

Canadian composer, conductor, and music educator

Gilles Bellemare (born 29 March 1952, Shawinigan) is a Canadian composer, conductor, and music educator. He has been commissioned to write music for more than 30 professional ensembles internationally, many of which have been recorded or performed on CBC Radio under his baton. He has also written a number of film scores and is an associate of the Canadian Music Centre. In 1977 he was awarded the William St Clair Low Award by the Composers, Authors and Publishers Association of Canada. In 1978 he assumed the post of principal conductor and artistic director of the Orchestre symphonique de Trois-Rivières, a post he held until 2004. Under his leadership, the orchestra produced several commercial recordings and premiered works by such contemporary Canadian composers as Timothy Brady, Jacques Faubert, Anne Lauber, and Myke Roy.

Bellerme studied at the Conservatoire de musique du Québec à Trois-Rivières from 1968 to 1978, where he earned premier prizes in harmony (1972), percussion (1974), and music composition (1978). Among his most influential teachers at the school were percussionist Thomas Cavanagh and music theorist Armando Santiago. In the summer of 1977 he studied composition with Harry Freedman at the Courtenay Youth Music Centre through scholarships from the Canadian and Quebec governments. Further grants allowed him to study with Franco Donatoni at the Accademia Nazionale di Santa Cecilia in Rome, Italy (1978–1980) and with Erich Urbanner at the University of Music and Performing Arts, Vienna (1980–1981).

Bellerme is married to pianist Denise Trudel. He has taught on the faculty of the Conservatoire de musique du Québec à Trois-Rivières since 1984.
