= James Clifford Brown =

English composer

James Clifford Brown (1923–2004) was an English composer, former Senior Lecturer in the Department of Music and Organist at the University of Leeds.

== Life ==
James Clifford Brown, usually referred to as James Brown, was born at 49 St. Matthew's Street, Ipswich on 18 August 1923. His father Henry John Brown was an electrical engineer and later professional cellist while his mother Lois was a junior school teacher. James also had a brother named Tom being a chartered engineer and a sister called Dulcie who has been a civil servant, a missionary and a music teacher of cello and classical guitar.

He was trained in singing and organ-playing by Jonathan Job, the Ipswich Borough Organist, then himself became organist and choirmaster at All Hallows' Church.

In 1941 he left Northgate School and won a choral studentship to St John's College, Cambridge, but his studies were interrupted by war service. He resumed study after his return in 1945, and was then appointed as organ student.

From 1948 until retirement in 1983 he was a lecturer, then senior lecturer, in the music department of the University of Leeds. He was active as a composer throughout this time. In 1951 he was asked by his friend Allan Wicks to write the music for the first major revival of the York Mystery Plays, which were a triumphant success. In 1961–1962 he took a year's leave to study with Boris Porena in Rome.

He made his home in Kirkstall until 2003. Subsequently he moved to Bridlington, where he died on 21 December 2004.

== Published works in print ==
See

- The Lark now leaves his wat'ry Nest, for 2-part female voices and piano, 1949
- Portsmouth, solo song with piano, 1949
- A Nocturne, solo song with piano, 1950
- Andante Sospirando, organ, 1951
- Sonatina, clarinet and viola, 1952
- The Lass for a Sailor, solo song with piano, 1955
- Careless Content, solo song with piano, 1957
- A Morning Pastoral, three songs for SSA, 1965
- Promenade, piano duet, 1974
- Silent Spring, solo song with piano, 1976
- If ye turn to him, motet for unison boys' voices and organ, 1980
- Serenade, clarinet in A and piano, 1950, revised 1985
- Prelude and Postlude for Easter, organ, 1987
- The Shepherds' Nativity Hymn, for SATB choir and wind orchestra, 1991
- From East to West, for SATB choir and keyboard, 1991
- Summer Idyll, organ, 2000
