= Marion Diederichs-Lafite =

Austrian musicologist

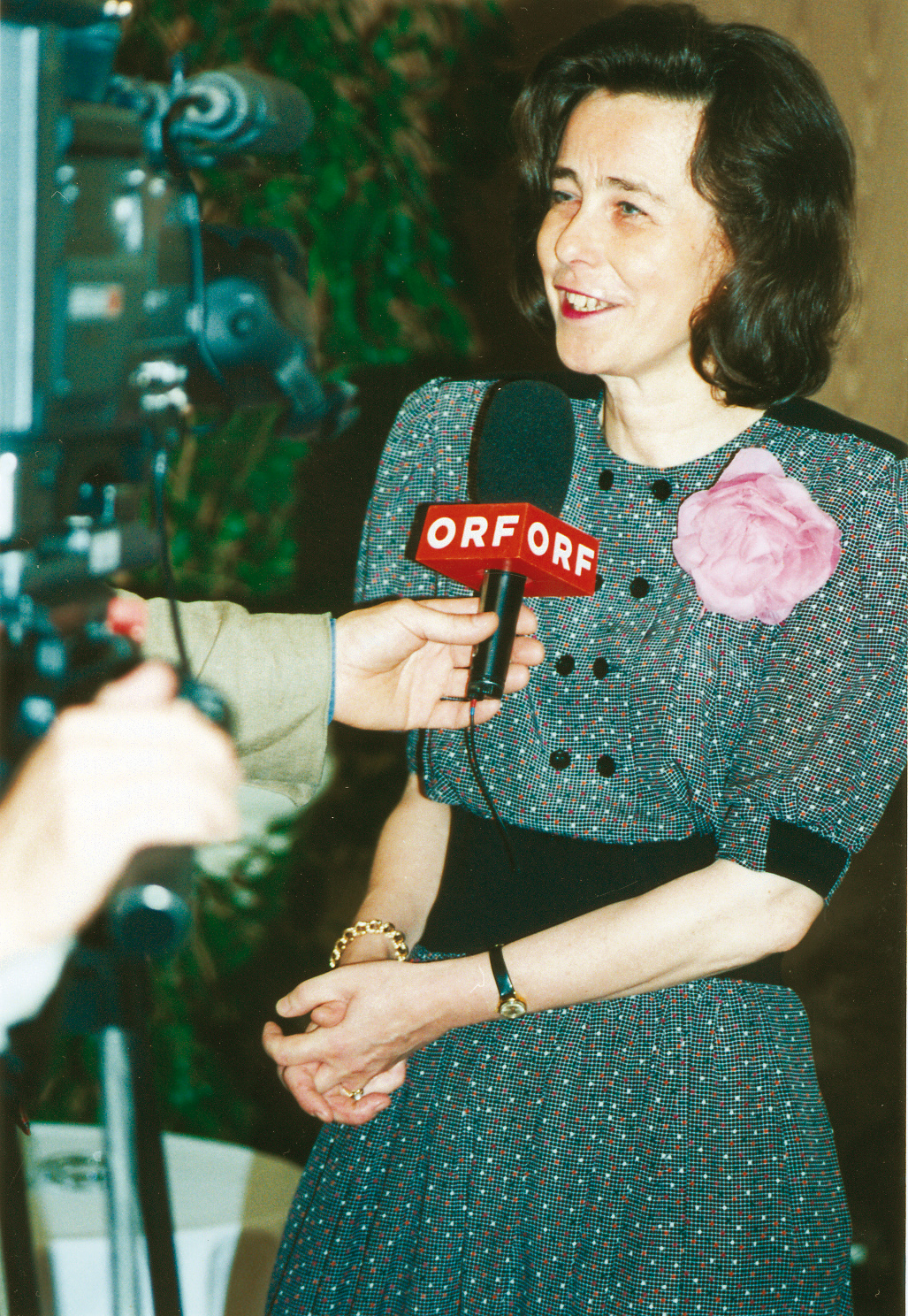

Marion Diederichs-Lafite (born 17 December 1947) is an Austrian music journalist.

== Life ==
Diederichs-Lafite was born in Vienna. After training at the French School and the "Sacré Cœur" secondary school in Vienna and a business course at the Vienna Commercial Academy, the daughter of Peter and Elisabeth Lafite studied musicology and journalism at the universities of Vienna, Cologne and Bochum from 1967, supplemented by courses at the Vienna Music Academy with Erwin Ratz and music seminars of the European Forum Alpbach with Rudolf Stephan and Carl Dahlhaus. She took part in the seminars Music criticism in this period at the Künstlerhaus Boswil on several occasions. In 1974 she received her doctorate at the University of Vienna with a dissertation on Music aesthetics in the early 19th century as presented in the "Leipziger Allgemeine musikalische Zeitung".

From 1975 - after marriage to Joachim Diederichs (art historian from the publishing family Eugen Diederichs) and three children - she worked as a freelancer, first in Kassel (Bärenreiter-Verlag, Kasseler Musiktage), then in Wilhelmshaven (adult education centre, lectures, seminar leadership). In the Österreichische Musikzeitschrift run by her mother where she started working as a staff member in 1970, she became co-publisher from 1980 on, took over the company in 1986 and was mainly responsible for the ÖMZ and the Verlag Lafite from 1990 on. For the design of country booklets she travelled to the USA (1975), Switzerland (1976) or England (1984) for in-depth research. Her main task was to deal with all topics and their leading authors. She started creative cooperations with composers' associations and also with musicology, opened the journal on current art music as well as on cultural-political questions with a forum of contemporary music discussions and accentuated (personally) special issues on music-aesthetic, pedagogical or gender-oriented topics.

The performance of the family business is based on the consulting activities of Manfred Wagner and Hartmut Krones as consultants, in cooperation with the Ministry of Foreign Affairs, the Austrian Academy of Sciences and other institutions was extensively documented for the 50th year in 1995 at a ceremony at the University of Music and Performing Arts Vienna, exhibitions at the European Forum Alpbach and at the Austrian National Library. Diederichs-Lafite edited a total of over 450 music periodicals and over 15 books of the Musikzeitedition.

== Memberships and awards ==
- Awarding of the title "Professor" 1999
- Board member of the Ernst-Krenek-Institut-Privatstiftung
- Member of the Board of the Arnold Schönberg Center Private Foundation
- Board member of the Austrian Society for Music.

== Publications ==
- Hanslicks unterschätzte Wegbereiter. In Gloria Withalm, Anna Spohn, Gerald Bast (edit.): Kunst, Kontext, Kultur. Festschrift für Manfred Wagner. Springer, Vienna 2012, ISBN 978-3-7091-1179-6, pp. 98–120.
- (Würdigung Hartmut Krones). In Julia Bungardt (edit.): Wiener Musikgeschichte: Annäherungen, Analysen, Ausblicke. Festschrift für Hartmut Krones. Böhlau, Vienna 2009, ISBN 978-3-205-78389-3, pp. 7–10 (Marion Diederichs-Lafite, p. 7, at Google Books)
- Kunst und Wissenschaft gehören zusammen, Interview with Cordula Bösze, in Freistil 41 February, Vienna 2012, p. 7 ff.
