= Clotilde Rosa =

Portuguese classical musician (1930–2017)

- Born: 11 May 1930; Queluz, Portugal
- Died: 24 November 2017 (aged 87); Lisbon, Portugal
- Known for: Composing, performing

Maria Clotilde Belo de Carvalho Rosa Franco (11 May 1930 – 24 November 2017), known as Clotilde Rosa, was a Portuguese harpist, pedagogue and composer.

== Biography ==
Clotilde Rosa was born in Queluz, Portugal, to José Rosa (1895–1939), violinist and tenor, and Branca Belo de Carvalho Rosa (1906–1940), pianist and harpist. She was the younger sister of Artur Rosa, who became an architect and sculptor; and the sister-in-law of Helena Almeida. Rosa began piano lessons at age ten with Ivone Santos, and harp lessons at the age of twelve under Cecilia Borba at Lisbon's National Conservatoire. Between 1960 and 1963 she continued her harp studies with several scholarships in Amsterdam with Phia Berghout, in Paris with Jacqueline Borot, and in Cologne with Hans Zingel. From 1963 until 1966 Rosa also took part in the Darmstadt Summer Courses, directed by Karlheinz Stockhausen, in Germany. After completing her studies, she worked as a harp soloist with various orchestras and ensembles.

In 1965 Rosa took part in the first Portuguese happening at Galeria Divulgação, along with António Aragão, E. M. Melo e Castro, Sallette Tavares (poet), Manuel Baptista, Jorge Peixinho (composer) and Mário Falcão (another harpist).

In 1970 Rosa co-founded the Lisbon Contemporary Music Group (GMCL) with composer Jorge Peixinho. The group performed contemporary music in Portugal, Brazil and across Europe. At the end of the 1970s, along with Carlos Franco and Luísa de Vasconcelos, Rosa formed Trio Antiqua, which focused on the interpretation of ancient music. Rosa was also part of the Porto Symphony Orchestra, the National Symphony Orchestra, from the National Broadcaster, and collaborated with the S. Carlos National Theatre Orchestra and the Calouste Gulbenkian Foundation Orchestra. She retired her orchestral career in 1987.

Between 1987 and 2000 Rosa lectured at the Music School of Lisbon's National Conservatory, first in Composition Analysis and Techniques (1987–1989) and later in Harp. This was the first time that a contemporary harp syllabus was taught in Portugal.

Rosa divorced her first husband, pianist and cellist Jorge Machado in 1961. She later married flautist Carlos Franco, another member of GMCL. She had three children, two of whom became musicians. Rosa died in Lisbon on 24 November 2017.

== Recognition ==
In 1976, Rosa started writing as an individual composer; at Jorge Peixinho's suggestion, her work Encontro for flute and string quartet was taken to the Tribune Internationale de Compositeurs in Paris by Joly Braga Santos and Nuno Barreiros. The piece, recorded at the National Radio Broadcast Company, received 10th place among 60 works from thirty countries.

Rosa won the first National Composition Contest of Portugal with her work Variantes I for solo flute.

== Works ==
Rosa composed over seventy works for solo instrument, chamber ensemble, symphonic orchestra, opera and cantata, among others. Selected works include:

- Encontro for flute and string quartet (1976)
- Alternâncias for flute and piano (1976)
- Variantes I for flute solo (1980)
- Três Canções Breves (1980)
- Cinzas de Sísifo (1986)
- O Fabricar da Música e do Silêncio (1987)
- Ciclo Vozes de Florbela (1990)
- Amor que mal existe (1992)
- Glosas Próprias (1998)
- Quiet fire (1999)
- Canto Circular (2000)
- El Vaso Reluciente (2003)

Rosa's works have been recorded and issued on CD, including:

- Musica para poesia Portuguesa / Cathariou, Martins, Tiexeira, Martins, et al.; (9 September 2008) La Ma De Guido
- Spiral Of Light: Portuguese Music for Strings and Marimba (8 June 2010) EtCetera Records
