= Fritz Zweig =

Danish director and screenwriter

- Born: 8 September 1893; Olomouc, Moravia
- Died: 28 February 1984 (aged 90); Los Angeles, California, USA
- Occupation: Conductor

Fritz Zweig (8 September 1893 - 28 February 1984) was a German conductor.

Born in Olomouc, Moravia, after graduating from the local high school, Zweig studied theory and composition under Arnold Schoenberg. He made his professional debut in 1913 at the Mannheim National Theatre. He served as conductor in important opera houses such as Theater des Westens, the Deutsche Oper Berlin, and the Kroll Opera House.

In 1927 Zweig was employed by the Berlin State Opera, but after the rise of power of the Nazis he was forced to leave his position because of the Law for the Restoration of the Professional Civil Service, and together to his wife Tilly De Garmo he fled to France and later to Poland, where he was offered the role of conductor at the New German Theatre in Prague. In 1938, he returned to France, but after the nazi occupation of the country he finally escaped to the United States, where he first worked as a conductor, and later, starting from 1946, as a music teacher. Among his pupils were Miklós Rózsa, Marilyn Horne and Grace Bumbry.
