= Josef Wallnig =

Austrian conductor

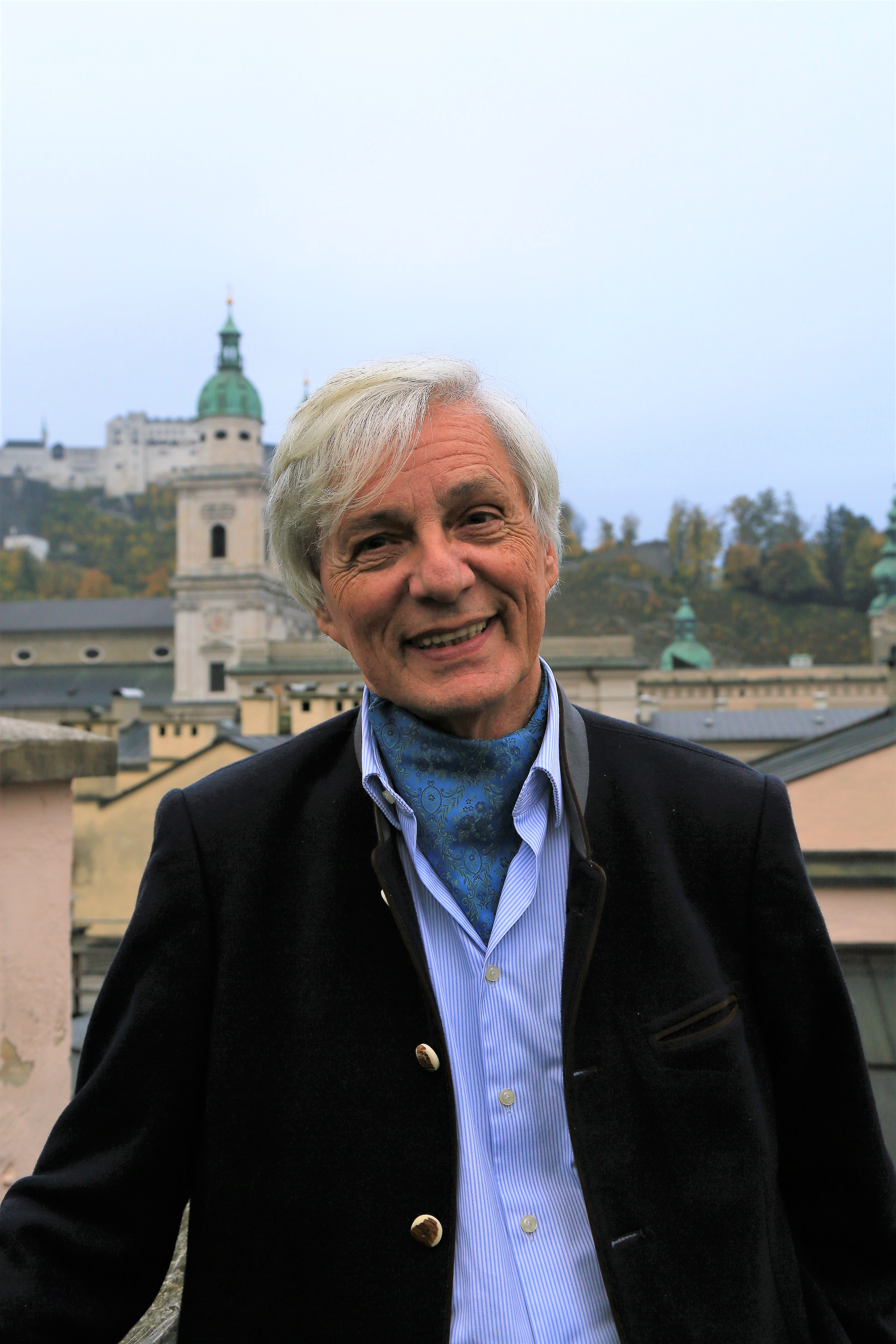
Josef Wallnig

Josef Wallnig was an Austrian conductor. He studied piano and composition at the Hochschule für Musik und darstellende Kunst Mozarteum in Salzburg, and also studied piano, composition, and conducting at the Hochschule für Musik und darstellende Kunst, Wien.

He is widely regarded as the global ambassador for Austrian, Salzburg, and W. A. Mozart's music. He received an honorary Doctor Honoris Causa degree from the Lithuanian Academy of Music and Theatre (LMTA) in 2008.
