= Pierre Bourque (saxophonist) =

Canadian saxophonist and music educator (1938–2014)

- Born: 27 January 1938; Plessisville, Quebec, Canada
- Died: 31 October 2014 (aged 76)
- Genres: Chamber
- Instrument: Saxophone

Pierre Bourque (27 January 1938 – 31 October 2014) was a Canadian saxophonist and music educator.

== Early life and education ==
Born in Plessisville, Quebec, Bourque attended the Collège de Lévis in his youth. While there, he was a member of the Sainte-Cécile concert band from 1948 to 1955. In 1955 he entered the Conservatoire de musique du Québec à Québec (CMQQ) where he was a pupil of Maurice DeCelles. He transferred to the Conservatoire de Paris in France in 1958 where he was a pupil of Marcel Mule. He graduated from the conservatory in 1961 with a premier prix in saxophone performance.

== Career ==
Following his graduation from the Conservatoire de Paris he joined the teaching staff

at the Orford Art Centre in Quebec in 1961. He held that position for 11 years. He also taught concurrently at several other institutions. In 1962 he joined both the music staff at the Collège de Ste-Anne-de-la-Pocatière, where he taught through 1965. He also joined the faculty of the CMQQ in 1962 as professor of saxophone and wind chamber music; a post he held for several decades. In 1972 and 197,3 he served as the director of the Conservatoire de musique du Québec à Chicoutimi. His notable pupils include Jean Bouchard, Claude Brisson, Jacques Larocque, and Rémi Ménard among others.

While a college student, Bourque toured as a recitalist in concerts mounted by Youth and Music Canada in 1960 and 1961. In 1962 he appeared as a soloist for the first time with the Quebec Symphony Orchestra (QSO). He has appeared with the QSO frequently since then and has also been heard often in concerts with the CBC Quebec Chamber Orchestra. In 1963 he founded the Pierre Bourque Saxophone Quartet with several of his students at the CMQQ. The quartet actively performed and recorded together for more than 20 years; giving tours both in Canada and abroad. Bourque died on 31 October 2014, at the age of 76.
