= Joseph Müller-Blattau =

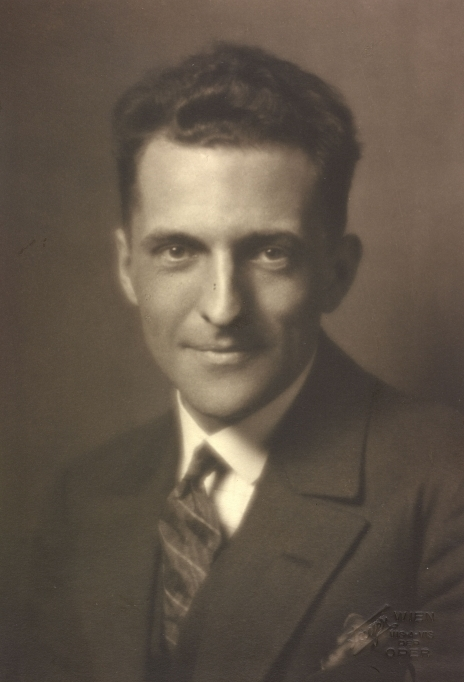
Joseph Müller Portrait (1927)

Joseph Maria Müller-Blattau (21 May 1895 – 21 October 1976) was a German musicologist and National Socialist cultural official. He is regarded as a "nestor of Saarbrücken musicology" but also as a "singer of a musical seizure of power" because of his activities in National Socialism.

== Life and career ==
Müller-Blattau, son of a senior teacher, was born in Colmar. He took part to the First World War. He studied musicology with Friedrich Ludwig at the University of Strasbourg, studied composition and conducting with Hans Pfitzner and organ with Ernst Münch. Later he studied at the Albert-Ludwigs-Universität Freiburg where Wilibald Gurlitt was his teacher. During his studies he became a member of the Musische Studentenverbindung Wettina Freiburg, later the Singererschaft Rhenania Frankfurt. In 1920, his doctorate in musicology at the University of Freiburg was completed with the work Grundzüge einer Geschichte der Fuge. In 1922, he got his habilitation and qualified at the University of Königsberg and became director of the musicological seminar and academic music director in Königsberg. From 1924 he was also director of the Institute for School and Church Music. In 1928 he was appointed extraordinary professor in Königsberg and he became musical advisor of the Ostmarken Rundfunk AG. In 1930 he became a member of the Königsberger Gelehrte Gesellschaft.

On May 1, 1933, he joined the NSDAP (number 3.536.556). In 1935 he took over a professorship for musicology in Frankfurt. A member of the SA since 1933, he worked in 1936 for the Ahnenerbe of the Schutzstaffel about Germaniser Erbe in deutscher Tonkunst. Heinrich Himmler contributed the preface. Also in 1936, he played an inglorious role in the removal of Wilibald Gurlitt by Friedrich Metz, the National Socialist rector of the University of Freiburg. In 1937 he was appointed Gurlitt's successor. From 1938 to 1942 he was the municipal music commissioner of Freiburg. A staunch anti-Semite, Müller-Blattau in 1940 called "the Jewry" "the leading voice of artistic decay" and the "group guilty of the [German] nation's decline". From 1939 to 1945 he participated with interruptions in the Second World War. Together with tenor Reinhold Hammerstein, Blattau, who himself was a baritone, recorded battle songs for radio, such as Erde schafft das Neue and Heilig Vaterland by Heinrich Spitta or Es dröhnt der Marsch der Kolonne by H. Napiersky among other. In 1941 he was appointed to the Reichsuniversität Straßburg.

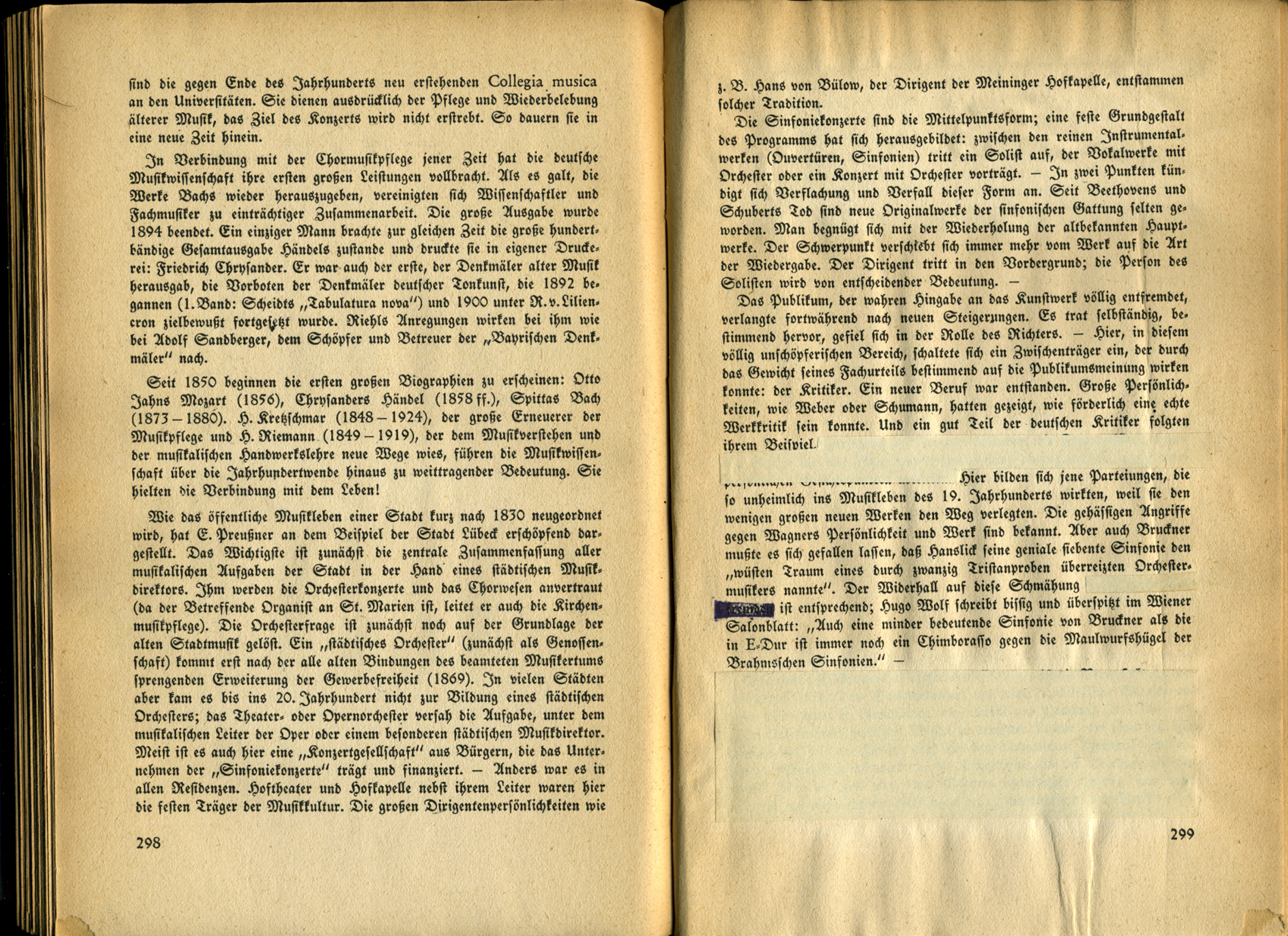
Müller-Blattau: Geschichte der Musik. Example of the NS-ideology areas pasted over by the publishing house in 1947 for further sale

After the Second World War he was a teacher at the Oberrealschule from November 1946 and Musikdozent (music lecturer) at the Pädagogische Akademie Kusel and then at the Nordpfalzgymnasium. In May 1952 he was appointed director of the Saarbrücken State Conservatory, where he founded the Institute for School Music. Since the winter semester of 1952/53, Müller-Blattau had been lecturing at the University of Saarland as a professor with full teaching responsibilities. After Saarland joined the Federal Republic of Germany, he became professor of musicology at the University of Saarland on April 1, 1958 and relinquished the direction of the Hochschule für Musik. In 1963 he became emeritus professor.

His book Geschichte der Deutschen Musik was placed on the Liste der auszusondernden Literatur (list of literature to be excluded) in the Soviet occupation zone. As a result, Vieweg-Verlag pasted over numerous parts of the current fourth unaltered edition (1944), which deal with B. about "Genius der Rasse" (p. 7), and the book could be sold for example in 1947 at the Musikhaus Stammer in Leipzig, as the corresponding stamped copies prove.

Müller-Blattau died in Saarbrücken at age 81.

== Publications ==
- 1922: Das Elsass ein Grenzland deutscher Musik. Die Rheinbrücke, Freiburg i. B.
- 1923: Grundzüge einer Geschichte der Fuge. Musikwissenschaftliches Seminar, Königsberg i. Pr.
- 1931: Geschichte der Musik in Ost- und Westpreußen von der Ordenszeit bis zur Gegenwart. Gräfe und Unzer, Königsberg.
- 1932: Das deutsche Volkslied. Hesse, Berlin.
- 1934: Das Horst-Wessel-Lied. In Die Musik 26, 1934, p. 327ff.
- 1938: Germanisches Erbe in deutscher Tonkunst. Widukindverlag [der SS], Berlin.
- 1938: Geschichte der Deutschen Musik. Chr. Friedrich Vieweg, Berlin.
- 1949: Klingende Heimat. Pfälzer Liederbuch für Schule und Haus. Kranz, Neustadt a.d. Haardt.
- 1950: Johann Sebastian Bach: Leben und Schaffen. Reclam. Stuttgart.
- 1951: Taschenlexikon der Fremd- und Fachwörter der Musik. Hesse, Berlin-Halensee, Wunsiedel.
- 1955: Es stehen drei Sterne am Himmel. Die Volksliedsammlung des jungen Goethe. Bärenreiter, Kassel, Basel.
- 1966: Von der Vielfalt der Musik. Musikgeschichte, Musikerziehung, Musikpflege. Rombach, Freiburg i. Br.
- 1966: Von Wesen und Werden der neueren Musikwissenschaft. Festvortrag. Universität des Saarlandes, Saarbrücken.
- 1968: with Hugo Moser: Deutsche Lieder des Mittelalters von Walther von der Vogelweie bis zum Lochamer Liederbuch: Texte und Melodien. Stuttgart.
- 1969: Goethe und die Meister der Musik. Bach, Händel, Mozart, Beethoven, Schubert. Klett, Stuttgart.
- 1969: Hans Pfitzner. Lebensweg u. Schaffensernte. Kramer, Frankfurt am Main.
