= Mário Vieira de Carvalho =

Portuguese musicologist and author

Mário Vieira de Carvalho (Coimbra, 7 October 1943) is a Portuguese musicologist and author. His main research fields are sociology of music, philosophy and aesthetics of music, opera, contemporary music, music and literature, 18th-century studies, Wagner, Luigi Nono and Portuguese music from 18th to 21st centuries.

== Present activity ==
Mário Vieira de Carvalho is a full professor of sociology of music at Universidade Nova de Lisboa, Faculdade de Ciências Sociais e Humanas. He founded in 1997 and is chairman of CESEM - Centro de Estudos de Sociologia e Estética Musical (Research Centre for Aesthetics and Sociology of Music) at this university. He is member of the Academy of Sciences of Lisbon (elected in March 2008) and of the Direction of the European Academy of Music-Theatre (Europäische Musiktheater-Akademie - Vienna), since September 2001.

== Other positions and activities ==
Scientific dean of the Faculty of Human and Social Sciences (Universidade Nova de Lisboa) (1998–2002). vice-rector of this university (2003–2004). Scientific dean of the Department of Musicology (1987–1990 and 1996–1998). Secretary of State for Culture of the Portuguese Socialist Government (2005–2008). Member of the Research Committee 37 - Sociology of Arts - and Research Committee 51 – Sociocybernetics - of the International Sociological Association (ISA). Member of the International Musicological Society (IMS), and of the Portuguese PEN Club. Research grants from Calouste Gulbenkian Foundation (1980–1984), DAAD, Germany (1992), and Portuguese Foundation for Science and Technology (1995). Joachim Herz's assistant for dramaturgy and staging of Alban Berg's Wozzeck (Dresden, 1984). As visiting professor, courses of Sociology of Music at the Humboldt-University Berlin (2000) and the University of Innsbruck (2001), São Paulo, Brasil (2002), and Minho, Portugal (2004). 'Research fellow' at Free University of Berlin (1992) and King's College London, Institute of Advanced Musical Studies (1995). Graduation in Law at University of Lisbon (1968). PhD in musicology at the Humboldt-University, Berlin (1985). Intense activity as music critic between 1967 and 1990. Liszt Medaille of the Republic of Hungary (1986). He is author of many scientific publications on history, philosophy and sociology of music, and of many hundreds of press articles and reviews.

== Books ==
Books by Mário Vieira de Carvalho:

- Para um dossier Gulbenkian, Lisbon: Estampa, 1974;
- A música e a luta ideológica, Lisbon: Estampa, 1976;
- Estes sons, esta linguagem, Lisbon: Estampa, 1978;
- O essencial sobre Fernando Lopes-Graça, Lisbon, IN-CM, 1989;
- Pensar é morrer ou o Teatro de São Carlos na mudança de sistemas sociocomunicativos, Lisbon: IN-CM, 1993;
- Razão e sentimento na comunicação musical — Estudos sobre a Dialéctica do Iluminismo, Lisbon: Relógio d’Agua, 1999;
- Eça de Queirós e Offenbach — A ácida gargalhada de Mefistófeles, Lisbon: Colibri, 1999;
- Denken ist Sterben: Sozialgeschichte des Opernhauses Lissabon, Kassel / Basel / London, etc.: Bärenreiter, 1999;
- 'Por lo impossible andamos': A ópera como teatro de Gil Vicente a Stockhausen, Porto: Âmbar, 2005;
- Pensar a música, mudar o mundo: Fernando Lopes-Graça, Porto: Campo das Letras, 2006;
- A tragédia da escuta — Luigi Nono e a música do século XX, Lisbon: Imprensa Nacional-Casa da Moeda, 2007;
- (as Editor): Expression, Truth and Authenticity: On Adorno's Theory of Music and Musical Performance, Lisbon: Edições Colibri / CESEM - Centro de Estudos de Sociologia e Estética Musical, 2009;
- (as co-author with Fernando Gil): A 4 mãos – Schumann, Eichendorff e outras notas, Lisbon: IN-CM, 2005;
- (as co-editor with José Machado Pais and Joaquim Pais de Brito): Sonoridades Luso-Afro-Brasileiras, Lisbon: ICS, 2004;

Abstracts and tables of contents of these books on the openlibrary.org website.

== Scientific papers (selection) ==
- "Eça de Queirós e a ópera no século XIX em Portugal", in: Colóquio–Letras, 91 (1986): 27–37.
- "Parsifal oder der Gegensatz zwischen Theorie und Praxis als Dilemma der herrschenden Klasse", in: Beiträge zur Musikwissenschaft, XXVIII/4 (1986): 309–319.
- "Auf der Spur von Rousseau in der Wagnerschen Dramaturgie", in: Opern und Musikdramen Verdis und Wagners in Dresden, Dresden, Schriftenreihe der Hochschule für Musik «Carl Maria von Weber», 12 (1988): 607–624.
- "Trevas e Luzes na Ópera de Portugal Setecentista", in: Vértice, 27 (1990): 87–96.
- "Sociologia da Música — Elementos para uma retrospectiva e para uma definição das suas tarefas actuais", in: Penélope, 6 (1991): 11-19; Revista Portuguesa de Musicologia, I (1991): 37–44.
- "Nature et naturel dans la polémique sur l'opéra au XVIIIème siècle", in: Le Parole della Musica, vol.: II: Studi sulla Lingua della Critica del Teatro per Musica in onore di Gianfranco Folena (ed. by Maria Teresa Muraro), Florence: Leo S. Olschki, 1995: 95–146.
- "Illusion und Selbstdarstellung - Zur Entwicklung der Kommunikationssysteme im Musiktheater", in: Vom Neuwerden des Alten - Über den Botschaftscharakter des musikalischen Theaters, (Studien zur Wertungsforschung, vol. 29, ed. by Otto Kolleritsch), Graz-Vienna: Universal Edition, 1995: 141–149.
- "From Opera to Soap Opera: On Civilizing Processes, the Dialectic of Enlightenment and Postmodernity", in: Theory, Culture & Society, XII/2 (1995): 41–61.
- "Goldoni et le chemin vers le ‘naturel’ dans le théâtre et l’opéra au XVIIIème siècle", in: Convegno del Bicentenario Goldoniano (ed. by Carmelo Alberti and David Bryant), Venice: Istituto Internazionale per la Ricerca Teatrale, 1995: 233–244.
- "Danse et fanatisme religieux dans l’opéra du XXème siècle", in: Creature di Prometeo. Il Ballo Teatrale dal Divertimento al Drama (ed. by Giovanni Morelli), Florence: Leo S. Olschki, 1996: 475–497.
- "No hay caminos? — Luigi Nonos Verhältnis zur Geschichte", in: Das aufgesprengte Kontinuum. Über die Geschichtsfähigkeit der Musik (Studien zur Wertungsforschung, vol. 31, ed. by Otto Kolleritsch), Graz-Vienna: Universal Edition, 1996: 187–219.
- "Lebendige Aktion gegen geträumte Aktion: Musik und antifaschistischer Widerstand in Portugal", in: Musik und Revolution. Georg Knepler zum 90. Geburtstag (ed. by Hanns-Werner Heister), Hamburg: von Bockel, 1997: II, 325-347.
- "Productive Misreading of Baroque Opera: The Staging of Handel’s Serse by Herz (1972) and Giustino by Kupfer (1984)", in: Cinquant’anni di Produzioni e Consumi della Musica dell’Età di Vivaldi (1947–1997) (ed. by Francesco Fanna and Michael Talbot), Florence: Olschki, 1998: 229–255.
- "A cultura da escuta na novelística de Garrett: Viagens na minha terra", in: Leituras. Revista da Biblioteca Nacional, series 3, nº 4 (1999): 125–146.
- "Wozzeck und die Dialektik der Aufklärung", in Wozzeck und die Zwanziger Jahre (ed. by Ulrich Müller), Anif/Salzburg: Verlag Meier-Speiser, 1999: 153–167.
- "New Music between Search of Identity and Autopoiesis, or: The ‘Tragedy of Listening’", in: Theory, Culture & Society 16/4 (1999): 127–135.
- "Towards Dialectic Listening: Quotation and Montage in the work of Luigi Nono", in: Contemporary Music Review 18/2 (1999): 37–85.
- "Roman als Offenbachiade - Ein Beispiel von Intertextualität zwischen Musik und Literatur", in Musik als Text. Bericht über den internationalen Kongreß der Gesellschaft für Musikforschung, Freiburg im Bresgau 1993 (ed. by Hermann Danuser), Kassel etc.: Bärenreiter-Verlag, 1999: II, 222-226.
- « La sociologie de la musique en quête de son objet », in Critique, 639-640, Agosto/Setembro 2000: 790–803.
- "Sociology of Music as Self-Critical Musicology", in: Musicology and Sister Disciplines – Past, Present, Future (ed. by David Greer), Oxford, Oxford University Press, 2000: 342–366.
- "Fernando Lopes-Graça: Une biographie marquée par la tension antre l’art et la politique", in: Biographies (Arquivos do Centro Cultural Calouste Gulbenkian), vol. XXXIX, Lisboa/Paris, Centro Cultural Calouste Gulbenkian, 2000: 291–303.
- "Art as Autopoiesis? A critical approach beginning with the European musical avant-garde in the early 1950s", in Journal of Sociocybernetics, II/1 (2001): 33–40.
- "Verfilmte Oper als episches Theater: Am Beispiel von Bergmanns Zauberflöte und Oliveiras Die Kannibalen", in: «…Ersichtlich gewordene Taten der Musik»: Das Musiktheater in den audiovisuellen Medien (ed. by Peter Csobádi, Gernot Gruber, Jürgen Kühnel, Ulrich Müller, Oswald Panagl, Franz Viktor Spechtler) Anif-Salzburg: Verlag Meier-Speiser, 2001: 196–207.
- "Fragmento e montagem na ficção de Eça de Queirós: o universo sonoro", in: Actas do Congresso de Estudos Queirosianos — IV Encontro Internacional de Estudos Queirosianos (6 a 8 de Setembro de 2000) (ed. by Carlos Reis), Coimbra: Universidade de Coimbra / Almedina, 2002: 75–89.
- "A música e a escuta em Os Teclados de Teolinda Gersão", in: Saberes no Tempo — Revista da Faculdade de Ciências Sociais e Humanas (ed. by Maria Helena Mateus and Clara Nunes Correia), Lisbon: Colibri, 2002: 599–605.
- "Erros de diagnóstico na arte e na vida: Wozzeck no consultório do Doutor", in: Revista Portuguesa de Musicologia, 12 (2002): 177–200.
- "A partitura como espírito sedimentado: Em torno da teoria da interpretação musical de Adorno", in: Theoria Aesthetica (ed. by Rodrigo Duarte), Porto Alegre (Brasil): Escritos Editora, 2005: 203-224;
- "Série, alea e autopoiesis", in: O Pensamento de Niklas Luhmann (ed. by José Manuel Santos), Covilhã: Universidade da Beira Interior / TA Pragmata, 2005: 165-184;
- "Pour une culture de l´écoute", in: Forum Européen des Orchestres, sous le parrainage de Pierre Boulez et Henri Dutilleux, 2005: 25–28.
- "Belcanto-Kultur und Aufklärung: Blick auf eine widersprüchliche Beziehung im Lichte der Opernrezeption", in: Soziale Horizonte von Musik – Ein kommentiertes Lesebuch zur Musiksoziologie (ed. by Christian Kaden / Karsten Mackensen), Kassel / Basel / London: Bärenreiter, 2006: 35–55.
- "Meaning, Mimesis, Idiom: On Adorno's Theory of Musical Performance", in: Expression, Truth and Authenticity: On Adorno's Theory of Music and Musical Performance (ed. by Mário Vieira de Carvalho), Lisbon: Colibri / CESEM, 2009: 83–94.
- “A construção do objecto da sociologia da música”, in Memorias da Academia das Ciências de Lisboa (online)
- “La partitura como ‘espíritu sedimentado’: En torno a la Teoría de la Interpretación Musical de Adorno”, in: Azafea, Rev. filos. 11, 2009: 143–161
- “Der Ring in Lissabon im Paradigmenwechsel der Kommunikation (1909–2009)”, in: Richards Wagners Der Ring des Nibelungen - Europäische Traditionen und Paradigmen (ed. by Isolde Schmid-Reiter), Vienna: EMA / ConBrio Verlagsgesellschaft, 2010: 181–190.
- “A República e as mudanças na cultura musical e músico-teatral”, in: A Vida Cultural na Lisboa da I República (1910–1926), ed. by Álvaro Costa Matos and João Carlos Oliveira, Lisbon: Câmara Municipal de Lisboa, 2011: 187-229. ISBN 978-972-8695-40-8
- “Jorge Peixinho: Entdeckung einer musikalischen Persönlichkeit”, in: Musik-Kontexte – Festschrift für Hanns-Werner Heister (ed. by Thomas Phleps and Wieland Reich), 2 vols., Münster: Verlagshaus Monsenstein und Vannerdat OHG, 2011: I, 150-164. ISBN 978-3869913209
- "Musical Autonomy as a Referential System", in: Music and its Referential Systems, ed. by Matjaž Barbo and Thomas Hochradner, Vienna: Hollitzer, 2011: 7-23. ISBN 978-3-99012-018-7
- “A música entre a confrontação e o diálogo interculturais”, in: Música/Musicología y Colonialismo (ed. by Coriún Aharonián), Montevideo, 2011: 41-65. ISBN 9789974361843
- "Der Trug der Bedeutungen oder die Fesseln der Sprache: Von Eichendorffs zu Adornos musikalischer Poetik", in Musiken - Festschrift Christian Kaden zum 65. Geburtstag, edited by Katrin Bicher, Jutta Toelle and Jin-Ah Kim, Berlin: Ries & Erler, 2011: 245-265. ISBN 978-3-87676-017-9
- "The Ring in Lisbon: Changes of Paradigm in Communication (1909–2009)", in: International Conference Consequences of Wagner, ed. by Paulo Ferreira de Castro, Gabriela Cruz and David Cranmer (DVD), Lisbon: CESEM, 2012: 182–195.
- "Between Political Engagement and Aesthetic Autonomy: Fernando Lopes-Graça's Dialectical Approach to Music and Politics", in: Twentieth-Century Music (Cambridge University Press), 8/2 (2012): 175–202.
- "Politics of Identity and Counter-Hegemony: Lopes-Graça and the Concept of National Music", in: Music & Politics, 6/1 (2012): 1–12.
- "Idiom, Trauerspiel, Dialektik des Hörens. Zur Benjamin-Rezeption im Werk Luigi Nonos", in: Klang und Musik bei Walter Benjamin (ed. by Tobias Robert Klein, Muenchen / Paderborn: Wilhelm Fink Verlag, 2012.
