= Hans Münch (conductor) =

- Born: 9 March 1893; Mülhausen, German Empire
- Died: 7 September 1983 (aged 90) Basel, Switzerland
- Genres: Classical
- Occupations: Conductor, composer, instrumentalist, educator
- Instruments: Cello, piano, organ
- Years active: 1914–1966

Hans Münch (9 March 1893 - 7 September 1983) was a Swiss conductor, composer, cellist, pianist, organist, and music educator of Alsatian birth. His compositional output includes one symphony (premiered 1951), Symphonische Improvisationen (1971), and a number of cantatas.

== Life and career ==
Born into a family of musicians in Mülhausen, German Empire (new Mulhouse, in France), Münch was the son of conductor Eugen Münch and the nephew of organist and choral conductor Ernst Münch (1859-1928). He began his musical training with his father before pursuing studies in the organ and music theory with Albert Schweitzer. In 1912 he moved to Basel, ultimately becoming a naturalized citizen of Switzerland. He studied at the Basel Conservatory with Emil Braun (cello), Adolf Hamm (organ), and Hans Huber (composition).

From 1914 to 1916 Münch was a cellist in the Basel Symphony Orchestra. In 1918 he joined the faculty of the Basel Conservatory where he taught piano through 1932. He served as the director of the conservatory from 1935 to 1947. One of his notable students was Armando Santiago.

From 1921 to 1926 Münch conducted the Bach Choir in Basel, after which he was active directing various choral societies in the city like the Basel Gesangverein and the Basel Liedertafel. From 1935 to 1966 he conducted the Allgemeine Musikgesellschaft in Basel. He died in Basel at the age of 90.
