= Conservatoire de Strasbourg =

Music conservatory in Strasbourg, France

Coordinates: 48.5744°N 7.7557°E

The Conservatoire de Strasbourg is a music conservatory located in Strasbourg, France. The school has about 1800 students.

== History of the Conservatory of Strasbourg ==
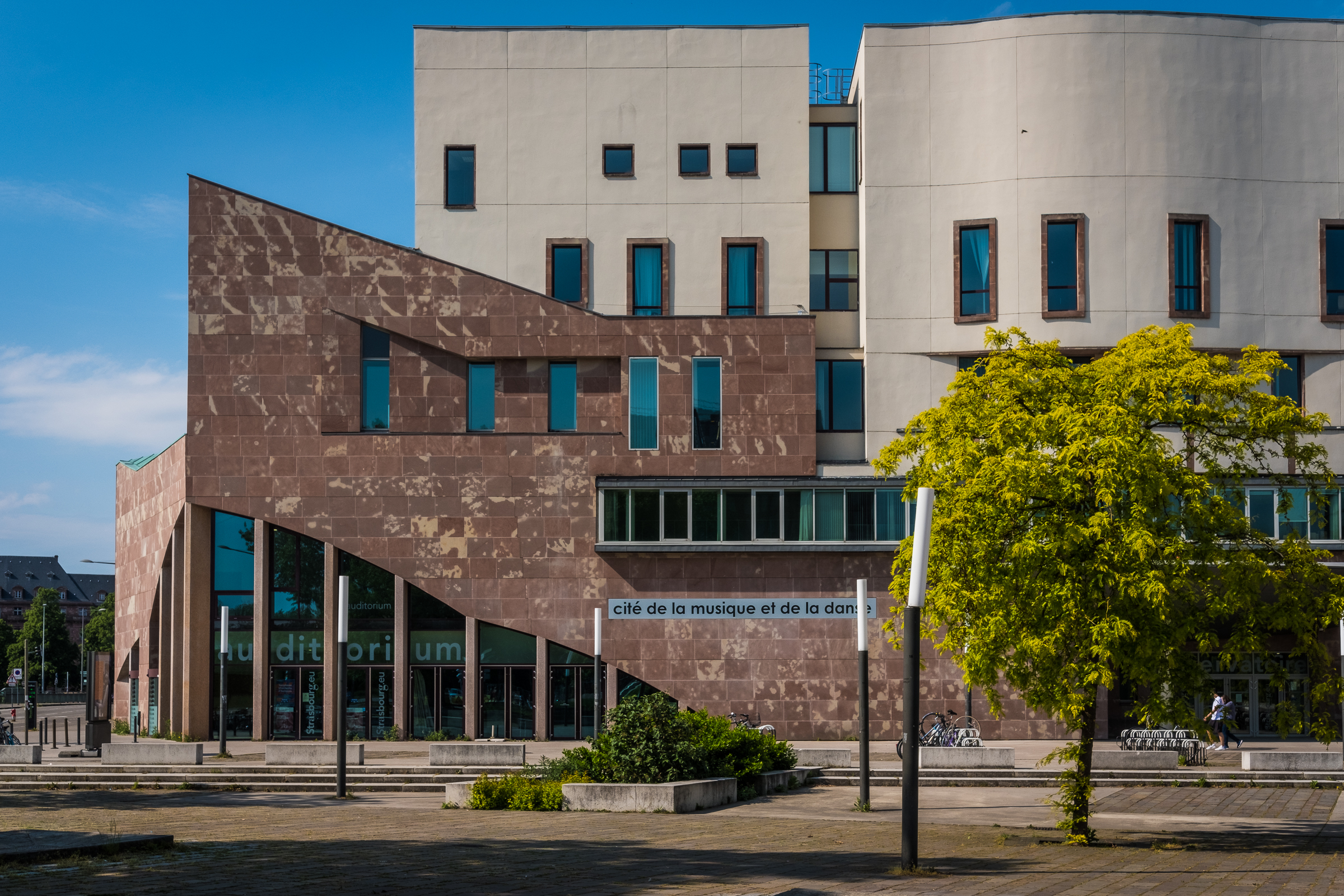
Cité de la musique et de la danse Strasbourg (2020)

The school was created using funds given to the city of Strasbourg by arts patron Louis Apffel in 1839. The conservatoire's first day of classes began on 3 January 1855.

It is indeed this considerable amount of the legacy donated by Louis Apffel which allowed the municipality to establish a conservatory which also emanated a symphonic orchestra, historically born the second in France after Paris.

In 1922 the Conservatory moved into the building now occupied by the National Theatre of Strasbourg. It shared the building with the TNS until 1995, when it moved into two temporary accommodations in the Laiterie (fr:La Laiterie) and at 4, rue Brûlée, until a custom-built centre was completed in the new Rivétoile development, the Cité de la Musique et de la danse, which was inaugurated in 2006.

After the direction of Franz Stockhausen (1871 to 1908) the composer Hans Pfitzner assumed the role as one of his positions in the musical life of the city. On the return of Alsace to France, Ernest Munch took over as director for a year, succeeded by Jean-Guy Ropartz (1919–29). From 1929 to 1960 the director was Fritz Münch, who on his retirement was succeeded by Louis Martin.
