= List of music students by teacher: C to F =

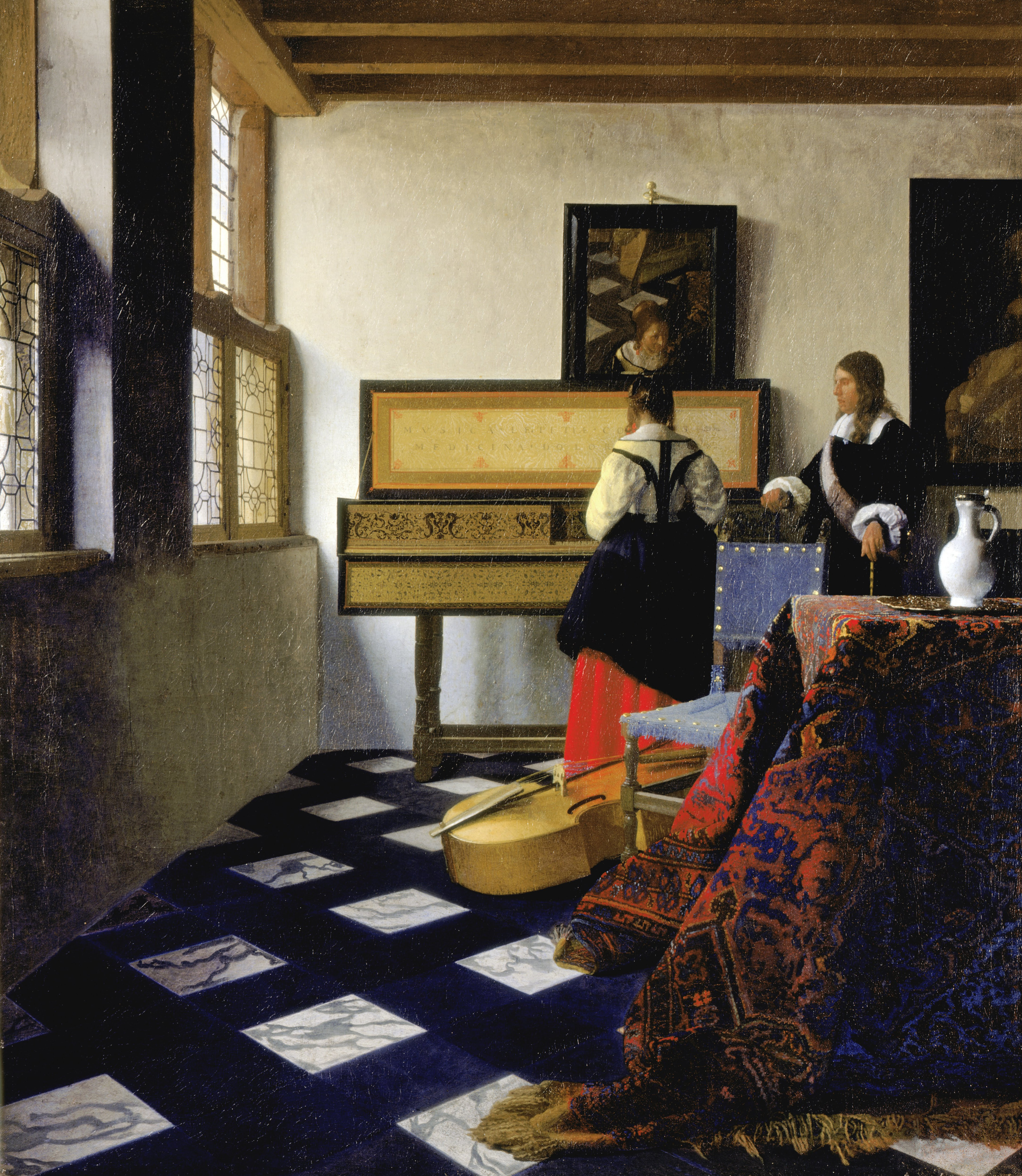

This is part of a list of students of music, organized by teacher.

== C ==
=== Pasquale Cafaro ===
this teacher's teachers
Cafaro (1716–1787) studied with teachers including Lorenzo Fago.
- Francesco Bianchi [pupils]

=== John Cage ===
this teacher's teachers
Cage (1912–1992) studied with teachers including Henry Cowell, Lazare Lévy, and Arnold Schoenberg.
- Beth Anderson
- Dawn Avery
- George Brecht
- Dubravko Detoni
- Robert Ellis Dunn
- Al Hansen
- Dick Higgins
- Toshi Ichiyanagi
- Ben Johnston [pupils]
- Allan Kaprow
- Jackson Mac Low
- Margaret Leng Tan
- Richard Maxfield [pupils]
- Hugh Merrill
- Relly Raffman
- Richard Rijnvos
- Dorothea Rockburne
- Christian Wolff

=== Antonio Caldara ===
this teacher's teachers
Caldara (c. 1670–1736) studied with teachers including Giovanni Legrenzi.
- Nicolas Bernier [pupils]
- Johann Georg Reutter

=== Francesco Antonio Calegari ===
this teacher's teachers
F. A. Calegari (1656–1742) studied with teachers including Antonio Lotti.
- Francesco Antonio Vallotti [pupils]

=== Charles Camilleri ===
this teacher's teachers
Camilleri (1931–2009) studied with teachers including Joseph Abela Scolaro, Paul Nani, Carmelo Pace, and John Weinzweig.
- Mariella Cassar-Cordina
- John Galea

=== Faustino Camisani ===
- Antonio Bazzini [pupils]

=== Conrado del Campo ===
- Salvador Bacarisse
- Julián Bautista [pupils]
- María de Pablos Cerezo
- Fernando Remacha
- Domingo Santa Cruz [pupils]

=== Ettore Campogalliani ===
- Carlo Bergonzi
- Giuliano Bernardi
- Antonio Carangelo
- Mirella Freni
- Ferruccio Furlanetto
- Luciano Pavarotti
- Gino Penno
- Ruggero Raimondi
- Felix Rolke
- Renata Scotto
- Renata Tebaldi

=== André Campra ===
- André Cardinal Destouches

=== Maria Canals i Cendrós ===
this teacher's teachers
Cendrós (1914–2010) studied with teachers including Lluís Millet and Ricardo Viñes.
- Leonora Milà Romeu

=== Christian Cannabich ===
this teacher's teachers
Cannabich (1731–1798) studied with teachers including Niccolò Jommelli, Giovanni Battista Sammartini, and Johann Stamitz.
- Wilhelm Cramer
- Christian Danner [pupils]
- Anton Stamitz [pupils]
- Carl Stamitz

=== Lucien Capet ===
this teacher's teachers
Capet (1873–1928) studied with teachers including Jean-Pierre Maurin.
- Jascha Brodsky [pupils]
- Ivan Galamian [pupils]

=== Michele Carafa ===
this teacher's teachers
Carafa (1787–1872) studied with teachers including Francesco Ruggi.
- Achille Peri

=== Cornelius Cardew ===
this teacher's teachers
Cardew (1936–1981) studied with teachers including Howard Ferguson, Kyla Greenbaum, Goffredo Petrassi, Karlheinz Stockhausen, and Percy Waller.
- Craig Armstrong
- John Cale
- Christopher Hobbs
- Hugh Shrapnel
- Howard Skempton

=== John Carewe ===
this teacher's teachers
Carewe (b. 1933) studied with teachers including Pierre Boulez, Max Deutsch, Walter Goehr, and Olivier Messiaen.
- Simon Rattle [pupils]

=== Clive Carey ===
this teacher's teachers
Carey (1883–1968) studied with teachers including Jean de Reszke and Charles Villiers Stanford.
- Edith Coates
- Rita Hunter
- Arnold Matters
- Elsie Morison
- Margaret Nisbett
- John Noble
- Alberto Remedios
- Betty Roe
- Eric Shilling
- Joan Sutherland

=== Henry Carey ===
- Kitty Clive

=== Giacomo Carissimi ===
- Vincenzo Albrici [pupils]
- Giuseppe Corsi da Celano [pupils]
- Marc-Antoine Charpentier
- Johann Caspar Kerll
- Alessandro Scarlatti [pupils]

=== Gaetano Carpani ===
this teacher's teachers
Carpani () studied with teachers including Orazio Benevoli and Alessandro Scarlatti.
- Giuseppe Jannacconi

=== Ambrosio Carreño ===
- Bartolome Bello
- Jose de la Luz Urbano
- Juan Manuel Olivares

=== Teresa Carreño ===
this teacher's teachers
Carreño (1853–1917) studied with teachers including Louis Moreau Gottschalk, Georges Mathias, and Anton Rubinstein.
- Edward MacDowell [pupils]
- Alfred La Liberté [pupils]
- Alexandre Mottu [pupils]

=== Richard Carte ===
this teacher's teachers
Carte (1808–1891) studied with teachers including George Rudall.
- Richard Shepherd Rockstro [pupils]

=== Elliott Carter ===
this teacher's teachers
Carter (1908–2012) studied with teachers including Nadia Boulanger, Edward Burlingame Hill, Gustav Holst, and Walter Piston.
- Ronald Caltabiano
- Joel Chadabe [pupils]
- Alvin Curran [pupils]
- Joel Hoffman
- Tod Machover
- Jeffrey Mumford
- Oliver Nelson
- Tobias Picker
- Ronald Roseman
- David Schiff
- William Schimmel
- Gitta Steiner
- Ellen Taaffe Zwilich

=== Robert Casadesus ===
this teacher's teachers
Casadesus (1899–1972) studied with teachers including Louis Diémer.
- Claude Helffer
- Manuel Herrarte
- Grant Johannesen
- George Theophilus Walker

=== Alfredo Casella ===
this teacher's teachers
Casella (1883–1947) studied with teachers including Gabriel Fauré.
- Alma Brughera Capaldo
- Jerome Moross
- Maurice Ohana
- Vittorio Rieti

=== John Casken ===
this teacher's teachers
Casken (1949-) studied with teachers including John Joubert, Peter Dickinson, and Andrzej Dobrowolski.
- Michael Alcorn
- David Jennings

=== Aaron Cassidy ===
- Chikako Morishita

=== Mario Castelnuovo-Tedesco ===
- Scott Bradley
- Frank De Vol
- Dominic Frontiere
- Jerry Goldsmith
- Leon Levitch
- Henry Mancini
- Bill Marx
- Randy Newman
- Marty Paich
- Eugene Poddany
- André Previn
- Nelson Riddle
- Marco Rizo
- Hal Schaefer
- Herman Stein
- John Williams

=== Charles-Simon Catel ===
this teacher's teachers
Catel (1773–1830) studied with teachers including François-Joseph Gossec.
- Adolphe Adam [pupils]
- François Benoist [pupils]
- Nicolas-Charles Bochsa [pupils]
- Joseph Daussoigne-Méhul [pupils]
- Martin-Joseph Mengal [pupils]
- Jean-Henri Simon [pupils]

=== Georgy Catoire ===
this teacher's teachers
Catoire (1861–1926) studied with teachers including Karl Klindworth and Anatoly Lyadov.
- Dmitry Kabalevsky [pupils]
- Leonid Polovinkin

=== Georges Caussade ===
- Claude Arrieu
- Georges Auric
- Jean-Yves Daniel-Lesur [pupils]
- Fernande Decruck [pupils]
- Léon Destroismaisons
- Noël Gallon [pupils]
- Simone Plé-Caussade [pupils]
- Jean Rivier [pupils]
- Germaine Tailleferre

=== Richard Causton ===
this teacher's teachers
Causton (1971-) studied with teachers including Jeremy Dale Roberts, Franco Donatoni, Roger Marsh, Edwin Roxburgh, and Param Vir.
- Bertie Baigent
- Saman Samadi

=== José Cayetano Carreño ===
- Teresa Carreño

=== Maurizio Cazzati ===
- Giovanni Battista Vitali

=== Sergiu Celibidache ===
- Herbert Baumann

=== Bohuslav Matěj Černohorský ===
- Felix Benda [pupils]
- Josef Seger [pupils]
- František Tůma [pupils]

=== Ignacio Cervantes ===
this teacher's teachers
Cervantes (1847–1905) studied with teachers including Charles-Valentin Alkan, Louis Moreau Gottschalk, Antoine François Marmontel, and Nicolás Ruiz Espadero.
- Eduardo Sánchez de Fuentes

=== James Cervetto ===
this teacher's teachers
J. Cervetto (1748–1837) studied with teachers including Giacobbe Cervetto.
- Robert Lindley [pupils]

=== Beniamino Cesi ===
this teacher's teachers
Cesi (1845–1907) studied with teachers including Sigismond Thalberg.
- Michele Esposito
- Alessandro Longo [pupils]
- Giuseppe Martucci
- Samuel Maykapar
- Leopoldo Mugnone
- Vincenzo Scaramuzza [pupils]

=== Joel Chadabe ===
- Margaret Meachem

=== George Whitefield Chadwick ===
this teacher's teachers
Chadwick (1854–1931) studied with teachers including Salomon Jadassohn and Josef Rheinberger.
- Frederick S. Converse
- Wallace Goodrich
- Henry Kimball Hadley
- John Patton Marshall
- Daniel Gregory Mason
- Horatio Parker [pupils]
- Florence Price
- Edmund Severn
- William Grant Still
- Arthur Batelle Whiting

=== Henri Challan ===
this teacher's teachers
Challan (1910–1977) studied with teachers including Henri Büsser and Jean Gallon.
- Akira Miyoshi [pupils]

=== Evan Chambers ===
this teacher's teachers
Chambers (born 1963) studied with teachers including William Albright, Leslie Basset, Burton Beerman, Marilyn Shrude, Nicholas Thorne, and George Wilson.
- Clarice Assad
- David Biedenbender
- Andrew Bishop

=== Jacques Champion de Chambonnières ===
- Robert Cambert
- Louis Couperin

=== Claude Champagne ===
this teacher's teachers
Champagne (1891–1965) studied with teachers including Alexis Contant, André Gedalge, [[List of music students by teacher: C to F#Raoul Laparra Charles|Raoul Laparra Charles]], and Koechlin .
- Jocelyne Binet
- Lydia Boucher
- François Brassard
- Isabelle Delorme [pupils]
- Jean Deslauriers
- Orpha-F. Deveaux [pupils]
- Serge Garant [pupils]
- Rhené Jaque
- Roger Matton
- Pierre Mercure
- François Morel
- Clermont Pépin
- Micheline Coulombe Saint-Marcoux
- Georges Savaria [pupils]
- Robert Turner
- Gilles Tremblay [pupils]
- Jean Vallerand

=== Carlos Chávez ===
- María Teresa PrietoBlas Galindo

=== Luigi Cherubini ===
this teacher's teachers
Cherubini (1760–1842) studied with teachers including Giuseppe Sarti.
- Daniel Auber [pupils]
- François-Adrien Boieldieu [pupils]
- Isabella Colbran
- Fromental Halévy [pupils]

=== Ernst August Heinrich Chevallier ===
- Felix Woyrsch

=== Camille Chevillard ===
this teacher's teachers
Chevillard (1859–1923) studied with teachers including Georges Mathias.
- Gösta Nystroem

=== Barney Childs ===
- Gino Robair

=== Frédéric Chopin ===
this teacher's teachers
Chopin (1810–1849) studied with teachers including Józef Elsner, Wojciech Żywny, and Wilhelm Würfel.
- Marcelina Czartoryska
- Émile Decombes [pupils]
- Carl Filtsch
- Maria Kalergis
- Wilhelm von Lenz
- Georges Mathias [pupils]
- Marie Mauté de Fleurville [pupils]
- Karol Mikuli [pupils]
- Henriette Nissen-Saloman [pupils]
- Delfina Potocka
- Charlotte de Rothschild
- Fanny Stål [pupils]
- Jane Stirling
- Thomas Tellefsen
- Pauline Viardot [pupils]

=== Alexandre-Étienne Choron ===
this teacher's teachers
Choron (1771–1834) studied with teachers including Nicolas Roze.
- Gilbert Duprez [pupils]

=== Chou Wen-chung ===
this teacher's teachers
Wen-chung studied with teachers including Nicolas Slonimsky, Edgard Varèse, and Otto Luening.
- Charles Dodge
- David Froom
- Ge Gan-ru
- Talib Rasul Hakim
- Jing Jing Luo
- Jacques-Louis Monod
- Michael Rosenzweig
- Bright Sheng
- Faye-Ellen Silverman
- Tan Dun
- James Tenney [pupils]
- Chinary Ung [pupils]
- Hsiung-Zee Wong
- Chen Yi
- Zhou Long

=== John Chowning ===
this teacher's teachers
Chowning (born 1934) studied with teachers including Nadia Boulanger.
- Martin Bresnick [pupils]
- Scot Gresham-Lancaster
- David A. Jaffe
- Jonathan Kramer [pupils]
- Neil Rolnick
- Manfred Stahnke
- William Susman
- Wolfgang von Schweinitz
- Erling Wold

=== Tatyana Chudova ===
this teacher's teachers
Tatyana Chudova (1944–2021) studied with teachers including Tikhon Khrennikov, Lev Naumov, and Yuri Shaporin.
- Victoria Borisova-Ollas
- Andrey Kasparov

=== Adolf Chybiński ===
this teacher's teachers
Chybiński (1880–1952) studied with teachers including Jan Drozdowski, Felicjan Szopski, and Ludwig Thuille.
- Kazimierz Sikorski [pupils]

=== Gaetano Ciandelli ===
this teacher's teachers
Ciandelli (1801–1865) studied with teachers including Vincenzo Fenzi and Niccolò Paganini.
- Gaetano Braga
- Albert Boubée
- Ferdinando Forino [pupils]
- Giuseppe Magrini

=== Aldo Ciccolini ===
this teacher's teachers
Ciccolini studied with teachers including Paola Denza and Achille Longo.
- Antonio Pompa-Baldi
- Akiko Ebi
- Jean-Yves Thibaudet [pupils]
- Nicholas Angelich

=== Milo Cipra ===
- Ivo Malec [pupils]
- Marko Ruždjak

=== Frederick Scotson Clark ===
this teacher's teachers
Clark (1840–1883) studied with teachers including William Sterndale Bennett, Carl Engel, John Goss, Edward John Hopkins, and Ciro Pinsuti.
- William Hall Sherwood [pupils]

=== Charles W. Clark ===
this teacher's teachers
Clark (1865–1925) studied with teachers including Eugen Gura, George Henschel, and Alberto Randegger.
- Harold Lancaster Butler
- Helen Fouts Cahoon
- Jetta Cambell-Stanley
- Marie Cavan
- Robert Chignell
- John Frederick Clark
- Donna Riblette Flaaten
- Adna Smith Flo
- Ora Lightner Frost
- Albert Lukken
- Minetta May Magebs
- Ethel Rader
- Ralph Everett Sapp
- Irma Mentz Sears
- Charles Wanzer Starr
- Leda C. Steele

=== Jeremiah Clarke ===
this teacher's teachers
Clarke (1674–1707) studied with teachers including John Blow.
- William Hine [pupils]

=== Johann Heinrich Clasing ===
- Eduard Marxsen [pupils]

=== Muzio Clementi ===
this teacher's teachers
Clementi (1752–1832) studied with teachers including Giuseppe Santarelli.
- Therese Jansen Bartolozzi
- Ludwig Berger [pupils]
- Catherina Cibbini-Kozeluch
- Johann Baptist Cramer [pupils]
- John Field [pupils]
- August Alexander Klengel
- Francesco Lanza [pupils]
- Ignaz Moscheles [pupils]
- Venanzio Rauzzini [pupils]
- Carl Traugott Zeuner
- Anne Soria [pupils]

=== Frederic Cliffe ===
this teacher's teachers
Cliffe (1857–1931) studied with teachers including Ebenezer Prout, John Stainer, Arthur Sullivan, and Franklin Taylor.
- Arthur Benjamin [pupils]
- Howard Hadley [pupils]
- John Ireland [pupils]

=== Helen Coates ===
this teacher's teachers
Coates (born 1899, died 27/02/1989) studied with teachers including Heinrich Gebhard.
- Leonard Bernstein [pupils]

=== Theodor Coccius ===
- Algernon Ashton
- Oskar Merikanto
- Aleksander Michałowski [pupils] (studied 1867–1869)
- Constantin Sternberg [pupils]

=== Philip Cogan ===
- Thomas Augustine Geary
- Michael Kelly
- Thomas Moore
- Peter K. Moran
- William Michael Rooke [pupils]

=== Jerry Coker ===
- Randy Brecker
- Tony Campise
- Mark Egan

=== Randolph Coleman ===
- Du Yun
- Kyle Gann
- Evan Hause
- Bill Irwin
- Christopher Rouse [pupils]
- Greg Saunier
- Julie Taymor
- Brenda Way

=== Valborg Collett ===
this teacher's teachers
Collett studied with teachers including Agathe Backer-Grøndahl.
- Ruth Crawford Seeger [pupils]

=== Giovanni Paolo Colonna ===
- Giovanni Bononcini

=== Edward T. Cone ===
this teacher's teachers
Cone (1917–2004) studied with teachers including Roger Sessions.
- Michael Dellaira
- Hobart Earle
- John Eaton [pupils]
- Alan Fletcher
- Robert Greenberg
- John Heiss [pupils]
- Sydney Hodkinson [pupils]
- Paul Lansky [pupils]
- David Lewin [pupils]
- Gilbert Levine
- Malcolm Peyton [pupils]
- Harold Powers
- Victor Rosenbaum
- John Solum
- Richard Aaker Trythall
- Edgar Warren Williams

=== Paul Constantinescu ===
- Valentin Gheorghiu
- Octavian Nemescu
- Carmen Petra Basacopol
- Doru Popovici

=== Alexis Contant ===
this teacher's teachers
Contant (1858–1918) studied with teachers including Calixa Lavallée.
- Claude Champagne [pupils]
- Orpha-F. Deveaux [pupils]
- J.-J. Gagnier
- Rodolphe Mathieu
- Wilfrid Pelletier

=== David Conte ===
this teacher's teachers
Conte studied with teachers including Nadia Boulanger, Karel Husa, and Steven Stucky.
- Eugene Birman
- Eric Choate
- Ilya Demutsky
- Ian Dicke
- Joshua Fishbein
- Alexander Goodhart
- Peter Hilliard
- Michael Kropf
- Jason Martineau
- Jeffrey Parola
- Manly Romero

=== Carlo Conti ===
this teacher's teachers
Conti (1796–1868) studied with teachers including Niccolò Antonio Zingarelli and Johann Simon Mayr.
- Paolo Serrao [pupils]

=== Georgi Conus ===
this teacher's teachers
Conus (1862–1933) studied with teachers including Anton Arensky and Sergei Taneyev.
- Reinhold Glière [pupils]
- Alexander Scriabin [pupils]

=== Frederick Converse ===
this teacher's teachers
Converse (1871–1940) studied with teachers including Carl Baermann, John Knowles Paine, and Josef Rheinberger.
- Alan Hovhaness [pupils]
- Hisato Ohzawa
- Florence Price

=== Benjamin Cooke ===
this teacher's teachers
Cooke (1734–1793) studied with teachers including Johann Christoph Pepusch.
- Thomas Greatorex [pupils]
- Charles Hague [pupils]

=== Francis Judd Cooke ===
- John Bavicchi
- Sarah Caldwell
- Héctor Campos Parsi
- Stephen Casale
- Robert Ceely
- Robert Cogan
- Lyle Davidson
- Halim El-Dabh
- David Epstein
- Ercolino Ferretti
- William Hibbard [pupils]
- Billy Jim Layton
- Ruth Lomon
- Kenneth Peacock
- Richard Ronsheim
- Ernie Stires
- Albert Tepper
- Luise Vosgerchian

=== Henry Cooke ===
- John Blow [pupils]
- Pelham Humfrey [pupils]
- Henry Purcell [pupils]
- Thomas Tudway
- William Turner
- Michael Wise

=== Thomas Simpson Cooke ===
this teacher's teachers
Cooke (1782–1848) studied with teachers including Tommaso Giordani.
- Margaretta Graddon
- Elizabeth Rainforth
- Sims Reeves [pupils]
- John Templeton

=== George Cooper ===
this teacher's teachers
Cooper (1820–1876) studied with teachers including Thomas Attwood.
- Edmund Chipp
- Langdon Colborne
- Walter Parratt [pupils]
- Romain-Octave Pelletier I [pupils]
- John Stainer [pupils]
- Arthur Sullivan [pupils]
- Henry Willis
- Henry Wood [pupils]

=== John Cooper ===
this teacher's teachers
Cooper (c. 1570–1626) studied with teachers including .
- Charles I of England
- William Lawes

=== Paul Cooper ===
this teacher's teachers
Cooper (1926–1996) studied with teachers including Nadia Boulanger, Roger Sessions, and Halsey Stevens.
- Gabriela Lena Frank
- Svend Nielsen

=== Aaron Copland ===
this teacher's teachers
Copland (1900–1990) studied with teachers including Nadia Boulanger, Rubin Goldmark, Isidor Philipp, and Leonard Wolfson.
- Samuel Adler [pupils]
- Norma Beecroft
- Elmer Bernstein
- Leonard Bernstein [pupils]
- Paul Bowles
- Mario Davidovsky [pupils]
- Jacob Druckman [pupils]
- Halim El-Dabh
- Harold Farberman [pupils]
- Alberto Ginastera [pupils]
- Stefans Grové [pupils]
- Michael Horvit
- Anthony Iannaccone
- Osvaldo Lacerda
- Alcides Lanza [pupils]
- Alvin Lucier [pupils]
- Richard Maxfield [pupils]
- Leonard B. Meyer [pupils]
- Henrietta Michelson
- Charles Mills
- José Pablo Moncayo
- Thea Musgrave [pupils]
- Knut Nystedt
- Juan Orrego-Salas [pupils]
- Robert Moffat Palmer [pupils]
- Barbara Pentland
- Daniel Pinkham
- Einojuhani Rautavaara
- Gardner Read [pupils]
- Allen Sapp
- Michael Schelle
- Michael Tilson Thomas
- Douglas Townsend
- Lester Trimble
- John Verrall [pupils]

=== William Corbett ===
- William McGibbon

=== Frederick Corder ===
this teacher's teachers
Corder (1852–1932) studied with teachers including William Cusins, Henry Gadsby, Ferdinand Hiller, George Alexander Macfarren, and Isidor Seiss.
- Arthur Alexander [pupils]
- Granville Bantock [pupils]
- Hubert Bath
- Arnold Bax [pupils]
- William Henry Bell
- York Bowen [pupils]
- Sam Hartley Braithwaite
- Alan Bush [pupils]
- Eric Coates
- Paul Corder [pupils]
- Ambrose Coviello [pupils]
- Benjamin Dale [pupils]
- Learmont Drysdale
- Katharine Emily Eggar
- Harry Farjeon [pupils]
- Carl Hardebeck
- Michael Head
- Joseph Holbrooke
- Theodore Holland [pupils]
- Frank Hutchens
- Hermann Löhr
- Emma Lomax
- John Blackwood McEwen [pupils]
- Morfydd Llwyn Owen
- Montague Phillips
- William Henry Reed
- Alec Rowley
- Felix Swinstead

=== Paul Corder ===
this teacher's teachers
Corder (1879–1942) studied with teachers including Frederick Corder.
- Dorothy Parke [pupils]

=== Urbain Cordonnier ===
- François-Adrien Boieldieu [pupils]

=== Arcangelo Corelli ===
this teacher's teachers
Corelli (1653–1713) studied with teachers including Giovanni Battista Bassani, Ercole Gaibara, Bartolomeo Laurenti, Carlo Mannelli, and Matteo Simonelli.
- Pietro Castrucci
- Francesco Gasparini [pupils]
- Francesco Geminiani [pupils]
- Pietro Locatelli
- Giovanni Battista Somis [pupils]

=== John Corigliano ===
this teacher's teachers
Corigliano (1938-) studied with teachers including Paul Creston, Vittorio Giannini, and Otto Luening.
- Jefferson Friedman
- John Mackey
- Joelle Wallach
- Eric Whitacre

=== Domenico Corri ===
- Sophia Dussek [pupils]
- Venanzio Rauzzini [pupils]

=== Giuseppe Corsi da Celano ===
this teacher's teachers
Corsi da Celano (c. 1631/1632–1691) studied with teachers including Giacomo Carissimi.
- Petronio Franceschini [pupils]
- Giacomo Antonio Perti [pupils]

=== Alfred Cortot ===
this teacher's teachers
Cortot (1877–1962) studied with teachers including Émile Decombes and Louis Diémer.
- Pablo Arévalo [pupils]
- Gina Bachauer
- İdil Biret [pupils]
- Hélène Boschi
- Thierry De Brunhoff [pupils]
- Dino Ciani
- Jean-Michel Damase
- Clara Luisa Demar
- Yvonne Desportes [pupils]
- Margaret Fairchild
- Luc Ferrari
- Samson François
- Chieko Hara
- Mischa Kottler
- Yvonne Lefébure [pupils]
- Jeanne Leleu
- Dinu Lipatti
- Colette Maze
- Vlado Perlemuter [pupils]
- Simone Plé-Caussade [pupils]
- Olav Roots
- Jesús Maria Sanromá
- Nathan Schwartz [pupils]
- Ruth Slenczynska
- Williametta Spencer
- Vitya Vronsky
- Chris Mary Francine Whittle [pupils]
- Lucia Passaglia [pupils]

=== Antonio Cotogni ===
- Virgilio Lazzari
- Jean de Reszke [pupils]
- Mariano Stabile

=== Carlo Cotumacci ===
this teacher's teachers
Cotumacci studied with teachers including Alessandro Scarlatti.
- Francesco Azopardi
- Giovanni Furno
- Giuseppe Gazzaniga
- Giovanni Paisiello

=== Félix Le Couppey ===
this teacher's teachers
Couppey (1811–1887) studied with teachers including Victor Dourlen.
- Édouard Batiste
- Cécile Chaminade
- Józef Wieniawski

=== Ambrose Coviello ===
this teacher's teachers
Coviello (1887–1950) studied with teachers including Mathilde Verne and Paul Weingarten.
- Cyril Stanley Christopher
- Moura Lympany
- Dorothy Parke [pupils]

=== Henry Cowell ===
this teacher's teachers
Cowell (1897–1965) studied with teachers including Percy Goetschius and Charles Seeger.
- Johanna Beyer
- Elizabeth Brubeck (née Ivey; mother of Dave Brubeck)
- Burt Bacharach
- John Cage [pupils]
- Philip Corner
- George Gershwin
- Lou Harrison [pupils]
- John Heiss [pupils]
- Dick Higgins
- Donald Keats [pupils]
- Conlon Nancarrow
- Joseph Hanson Kwabena Nketia
- Ronald Roseman
- Ruth Crawford Seeger [pupils]
- Alan Stout [pupils]

=== Johann Baptist Cramer ===
this teacher's teachers
Cramer (1771–1858) studied with teachers including Muzio Clementi.
- George Eugene Griffin
- Rudolf Joseph Schachner

=== Ruth Crawford Seeger ===
this teacher's teachers
Crawford Seeger (1901–1953) studied with teachers including Valborg Collett, Heniot Levy, Louise Robyn, and Charles Seeger.
- Johanna Beyer
- Vivian Fine

=== Harold Craxton ===
this teacher's teachers
Craxton (1885–1971) studied with teachers including Tobias Matthay and Cuthbert Whitemore.
- Winifred Atwell
- Joyce Howard Barrell
- Howard Brown
- Susan Bradshaw
- Iain Hamilton
- Elaine Hugh-Jones
- Peter Katin [pupils]
- Alexander Kelly
- Denis Matthews
- Noel Mewton-Wood
- Hamish Milne [pupils]
- Albert Alan Owen
- Patrick Piggott
- Noel Mewton-Wood
- Alan Richardson
- Arnold van Wyk

=== Girolamo Crescentini ===
- Isabella Colbran
- Raffaele Mirate

=== Paul Creston ===
this teacher's teachers
Creston (1906–1985) studied with teachers including Gaston Dethier and Pietro Yon.
- John Corigliano [pupils]
- Ann Sandifur
- Gerard Schwarz [pupils]

=== William Croft ===
this teacher's teachers
Croft (1678–1727) studied with teachers including John Blow.
- Maurice Greene [pupils]
- James Kent
- James Nares [pupils]

=== William Crotch ===
this teacher's teachers
Crotch (1775–1847) studied with teachers including Charles Hague and Pieter Hellendaal.
- Lucy Anderson
- William Sterndale Bennett [pupils]
- Stephen Codman
- George Elvey [pupils]
- Charles Lucas [pupils]
- Cipriani Potter [pupils]
- Edward Francis Rimbault [pupils]
- Charles Kensington Salaman [pupils]

=== Connie Crothers ===
this teacher's teachers
Crothers (1941–2016) studied with teachers including Lennie Tristano.
- Richard Tabnik

=== George Crumb ===
this teacher's teachers
Crumb (1929–2022) studied with teachers including Ross Lee Finney.
- Jennifer Hidgon
- Ofer Ben-Amots
- Margaret Brouwer
- Uri Caine
- Dan Coleman
- Andrew Frank
- Osvaldo Golijov
- Jennifer Higdon
- Robert Kyr
- Cynthia Cozette Lee
- Gerald Levinson
- Lu Yen
- James Primosch
- Jay Reise
- Dennis Riley
- Morris Rosenzweig
- Christopher Rouse [pupils]
- Ricardo Zohn-Muldoon
- Melinda Wagner

=== Dimitrie Cuclin ===
- Marcel Mihalovici
- Achim Stoia

=== César Cui ===
this teacher's teachers
Cui (1835–1918) studied with teachers including Stanisław Moniuszko.
- Mischa Elman
- Nicholas II of Russia

=== G. D. Cunningham ===
this teacher's teachers
Cunningham (1878–1948) studied with teachers including Josiah Booth.
- E. Power Biggs [pupils]
- Cyril Stanley Christopher
- Michael Howard
- Arnold Richardson [pupils]
- George Thalben-Ball

=== Maria Curcio ===
this teacher's teachers
Curcio (1918–2009) studied with teachers including Nadia Boulanger and Artur Schnabel.
- Pierre-Laurent Aimard
- Martha Argerich
- Douglas Ashley
- Thomas Bartlett
- Peter Bithell
- Michel Block
- Evelyne Brancart
- Angela Brownridge
- Bertrand Chamayou
- Myung-whun Chung
- Rae de Lisle
- Simone Dinnerstein
- Barry Douglas
- Christopher Elton
- José Feghali
- Leon Fleisher
- Claude Frank
- Peter Frankl
- Frank Glazer
- Anthony Goldstone
- Suzanne Goyette
- Albert Guinovart
- Jean-François Heisser
- Ian Hobson
- Niel Immelman
- Terence Judd
- Angela Kim
- Vedat Kosal
- Dalia Lazar
- Eric Le Sage
- Radu Lupu
- Tessa Nicholson
- Rafael Orozco [pupils]
- Alfredo Perl
- Matti Raekallio
- Matthew Schellhorn
- Ignat Solzhenitsyn
- Yevgeny Sudbin
- Sergio Tiempo
- Hugh Tinney
- Geoffrey Tozer
- Dame Mitsuko Uchida
- Douglas Weeks

=== Alvin Curran ===
this teacher's teachers
Curran (born 1938) studied with teachers including Elliott Carter.
- Jorge Boehringer
- Eric Glick Rieman
- Wally Scharold

=== Clifford Curzon ===
this teacher's teachers
Curzon (1907–1982) studied with teachers including Nadia Boulanger, Katharine Goodson, Wanda Landowska, Tobias Matthay, and Artur Schnabel.
- George Theophilus Walker

=== Charles Cushing ===
this teacher's teachers
Cushing (1905–1982) studied with teachers including Nadia Boulanger .
- Jonathan Elkus
- Roger Nixon
- Loren Rush

=== William Cusins ===
this teacher's teachers
Cusins (1833–1893) studied with teachers including William Sterndale Bennett, François-Joseph Fétis, Charles Lucas, Cipriani Potter, and Prosper Sainton.
- Frederick Corder [pupils]

=== Solomon Cutner ===
this teacher's teachers
Solomon (1902–1988) studied with teachers including Mathilde Verne.
- Franz Reizenstein

=== Chaya Czernowin ===
this teacher's teachers
Czernowin (b. 1957) studied with teachers including John Eaton, Abel Ehrlich, Brian Ferneyhough, Andre Hajdu, Roger Reynolds, Izhak Sadai, Dieter Schnebel, Mordecai Seter, Joan Tower, and Eli Yarden.
- Rick Burkhardt
- Ben Leeds Carson
- Alexander Chernyshkov
- Ann Cleare
- Peter Ivan Edwards
- Sivan Cohen Elias
- Tamara Friebel
- Ashley Fure
- José-Luis Hurtado
- Clara Iannotta
- Evan Johnson
- Mary Kouyoumdjian
- Lei Liang
- Timothy McCormack
- Chris Mercer
- Karola Obermüller
- Marek Poliks
- Stefan Prins
- Julia Purgina
- Adam Roberts
- Elena Rykova
- Jason Thorpe Buchanan
- Alexander Sigman
- Rick Snow
- Johan Tallgren
- Dan Tramte
- Ming Tsao
- Bert Van Herck
- Gabriele Vanoni
- Thomas Wally
- Weiwei Xu
- Julio Zúñiga

=== Carl Czerny ===
this teacher's teachers
Czerny (1791–1857) studied with teachers including Ludwig van Beethoven, Johann Nepomuk Hummel, Muzio Clementi, and Antonio Salieri.
- Karl van Beethoven
- Theodor Döhler [pupils]
- Anton Door [pupils]
- Stephen Heller [pupils]
- Alfred Jaëll [pupils]
- Alfrēds Kalniņš
- Theodor Kullak [pupils]
- Theodor Leschetizky [pupils]
- Franz Liszt [pupils]
- Leopold von Meyer
- Anna Caroline Oury
- Sigismond Thalberg [pupils]

== D ==
=== Ingolf Dahl ===
this teacher's teachers
Dahl (1912–1970) studied with teachers including Volkmar Andreae, Nadia Boulanger, and Philipp Jarnach.
- Harold Budd
- David Cope
- Benny Goodman
- Morten Lauridsen
- Michael Tilson Thomas

=== Melanie Daiken ===
this teacher's teachers
d'Albert (1945–2016) studied with teachers including Yvonne Loriod, Olivier Messiaen, and Hugh Wood.
- Jeffrey Ching
- Roxanna Panufnik

=== Eugen d'Albert ===
this teacher's teachers
d'Albert (1864–1932) studied with teachers including Franz Liszt, Ernst Pauer, Ebenezer Prout, John Stainer, and Arthur Sullivan.
- Ernst von Dohnányi [pupils]
- Henry Jolles
- Frederick Loewe
- Walter Rehberg

=== Benjamin Dale ===
this teacher's teachers
Dale (1885–1943) studied with teachers including Frederick Corder.
- Walter Gaze Cooper
- Guirne Creith
- Marie Dare
- Christian Darnton
- Frederick Grinke
- Ivy Frances Klein
- Geraldine Mucha
- King Palmer
- Ian Parrott
- Kathleen Richards
- Godfrey Sampson
- Mansel Thomas
- Constance Warren

=== Jeremy Dale Roberts ===
this teacher's teachers
Dale Roberts (1934–2017) studied with teachers including William Alwyn and Priaulx Rainier.
- Victoria Borisova-Ollas
- Richard Causton [pupils]
- Erika Fox
- Erin Gee
- David Gompper
- Nicola LeFanu [pupils]
- Graham Lynch
- Andrew March
- Tony Noakes
- Tarik O'Regan
- Roberto Sierra
- Naresh Sohal
- Sophie Viney
- Caroline Wilkins

=== Gennaro D'Alessandro ===
this teacher's teachers
Gennaro D'Alessandro studied with teachers including Leonardo Leo.
- Thérèse Boutinon des Hayes [pupils]

=== Luigi Dallapiccola ===
this teacher's teachers
Dallapiccola (1904–1975) studied with teachers including Vito Frazzi.
- Dominick Argento [pupils]
- Don Banks
- Luciano Berio [pupils]
- Sylvano Bussotti
- Noel Da Costa
- Halim El-Dabh
- Richard Felciano
- Joel Mandelbaum
- Donald Martino
- Richard Maxfield [pupils]
- Julia Perry
- Bernard Rands [pupils]
- Leonard Rosenman [pupils]
- Edwin Roxburgh [pupils]
- Ernesto Rubin de Cervin [pupils]
- Frederic Rzewski
- Roland Trogan
- Raymond Wilding-White
- Arlene Zallman

=== Henri Dallier ===
this teacher's teachers
Dallier (1849–1934) studied with teachers including César Franck.
- Simone Plé-Caussade [pupils]

=== Leopold Damrosch ===
- Lillian Russell

=== Charles Dancla ===
this teacher's teachers
Dancla (1817–1907) studied with teachers including Pierre Baillot, Henri Montan Berton, Paul Guérin, Fromental Halévy, and Anton Reicha.
- Maud Powell
- Achille Rivarde [pupils]

=== Jean-Yves Daniel-Lesur ===
this teacher's teachers
Daniel-Lesur (1908–2002) studied with teachers including Georges Caussade and Jean Gallon.
- Maurice Ohana
- Georges Savaria [pupils]

=== Christian Danner ===
this teacher's teachers
Danner (1757–1813) studied with teachers including Christian Cannabich.
- Friedrich Johann Eck [pupils]

=== Edward Dannreuther ===
this teacher's teachers
Dannreuther (1844–1905) studied with teachers including Ferdinand David, Moritz Hauptmann, Ignaz Moscheles, Ernst Friedrich Richter, and Frédéric Louis Ritter.
- James Friskin
- John Alexander Fuller Maitland
- William Hurlstone
- Philip Napier Miles
- Hubert Parry [pupils]
- Bryceson Treharne [pupils]

=== Innocenz Danzi ===
- Franz Danzi
- Johann Nepomuk von Poißl
- Peter Ritter

=== Harold Darke ===
this teacher's teachers
Darke (1888–1976) studied with teachers including Frank Bridge, Walter Parratt, Hubert Parry, Herbert Sharpe, Charles Villiers Stanford, and Charles Wood.
- Antony Hopkins
- Peter Hurford
- Walter Leigh
- Elisabeth Lutyens [pupils]
- Peter Tranchell
- Eric Wetherell

=== Joseph Daussoigne-Méhul ===
this teacher's teachers
Daussoigne-Méhul (1790–1875) studied with teachers including Louis Adam, Charles-Simon Catel, and Étienne Méhul.
- César Franck [pupils]
- Jean-Théodore Radoux [pupils]
- Adolphe Samuel

=== Francis William Davenport ===
this teacher's teachers
Davenport (1847–1925) studied with teachers including George Macfarren.
- Ethel Mary Boyce
- Percy Buck
- Arthur Hinton
- Amy Elsie Horrocks
- Chester Edward Ide
- Colin McAlpin
- Percy Hilder Miles [pupils]
- Alicia Adélaide Needham
- Ellen Riley Wright

=== Ferdinand David ===
this teacher's teachers
David (1810–1873) studied with teachers including Moritz Hauptmann and Louis Spohr.
- Edward Dannreuther [pupils]
- Willem Kes [pupils]
- Johann Naret-Koning
- Henry Schradieck [pupils]
- Max Wertheim [pupils]

=== Johann Nepomuk David ===
this teacher's teachers
David (1895–1977) studied with teachers including Joseph Marx and Guido Adler.
- Hans Georg Bertram
- Seóirse Bodley
- Helmut Lachenmann [pupils]
- Hans Stadlmair
- Ruth Zechlin [pupils]

=== Mario Davidovsky ===
this teacher's teachers
Davidovsky (born 1934) studied with teachers including Milton Babbitt, Aaron Copland, Teodoro Fuchs, and Guillermo Graetzer.
- Leslie Bassett [pupils]
- Hayes Biggs
- Chester Biscardi
- Sergio Cervetti [pupils]
- Eric Chasalow
- Sheree Clement
- Conrad Cummings
- Michael Daugherty [pupils]
- Du Yun
- Jason Eckardt
- Richard Einhorn
- Brian Field
- David Froom
- Peter Gilbert
- Perry Goldstein
- Matthew Greenbaum
- José Luis Hurtado
- Edward Jacobs
- Mari Kimura
- Lei Liang
- Lu Yen
- Ingram Marshall
- Lansing McLoskey
- Karola Obermueller
- Gary Philo
- James Primosch
- Ken Ueno
- Chinary Ung [pupils]
- Chen Yi
- Zhou Long

=== Peter Maxwell Davies ===
this teacher's teachers
Davies (1934–2016) studied with teachers including Richard Hall, Earl Kim, Olivier Messiaen, Goffredo Petrassi, Humphrey Procter-Gregg, and Roger Sessions.
- Edward Barnes
- Darren Bloom
- Roberto Brambilla
- Roger Briggs
- Elisabetta Brusa
- Ronald Caltabiano
- Ross Edwards
- Susanne Erding-Swiridoff
- Philip Grange
- Hafliði Hallgrímsson
- Janice Hamer
- John Hopkins
- Rohan Kriwaczek
- Nicola LeFanu [pupils]
- Hilda Paredes
- Param Vir
- Paola Prestini
- Gillian Whitehead

=== Walford Davies ===
this teacher's teachers
Davies (1869–1941) studied with teachers including Hubert Parry and Charles Villiers Stanford.
- Basil Allchin [pupils]
- Edgar Bainton
- Maurice Blower
- Rutland Boughton
- William Henry Harris [pupils]
- Marion Scott
- Leopold Stokowski
- Bryceson Treharne [pupils]

=== Anthony Davis ===
this teacher's teachers
Davis (born 1951) studied with teachers including (unknown) .
- Peter Askim [pupils]
- Jon Forshee [pupils]
- Harold Meltzer [pupils]

=== Michael Daugherty ===
this teacher's teachers
Daugherty (born 1954) studied with teachers including Earle Brown, Pierre Boulez, Mario Davidovsky, Jacob Druckman, György Ligeti, Bernard Rands, and Roger Reynolds.
- Richard Adams
- Clarice Assad
- Alexis Bacon
- Armando Bayolo
- Kevin Beavers
- Derek Bermel
- David Biedenbender
- Andrew Bishop
- Gabriela Lena Frank
- Stacy Garrop
- Kristin Kuster
- David T. Little
- Jeff Myers
- Carter Pann [pupils]
- Joel Puckett
- Andrea Reinkemeyer
- Manly Romero
- Daniel Bernard Roumain
- Felicia Sandler
- Arlene Sierra
- Carlos Simon
- D. J. Sparr
- Matthew Tommasini
- Aleksandra Vrebalov
- Gregg Wramage
- Roger Zare

=== Karl Davydov ===
this teacher's teachers
Davydov (1838–1889) studied with teachers including Moritz Hauptmann.
- Aleksandr Verzhbilovich

=== Arthur De Greef ===
this teacher's teachers
De Greef (1862–1940) studied with teachers including Louis Brassin, Franz Liszt, Émile Mathieu, and François-Auguste Gevaert.
- Palmyre Buyst
- Berthe Laventurier [pupils]
- Marcel Poot [pupils]
- Janine Reding [pupils]

=== John de Lancie ===
this teacher's teachers
de Lancie (1921–2002) studied with teachers including Marcel Tabuteau.
- Theodore Baskin
- John Ferrillo
- Bruce Haynes
- Jay Light
- Richard Woodhams

=== Claude Debussy ===
this teacher's teachers
Debussy (1862–1918) studied with teachers including Émile Durand, Ernest Guiraud, Albert Lavignac, Antoine François Marmontel, and Antoinette Mauté de Fleurville.
- Erwin Schulhoff

=== Émile Decombes ===
this teacher's teachers
Decombes (1829–1912) studied with teachers including Frédéric Chopin.
- Alfred Cortot [pupils]
- Reynaldo Hahn [pupils]
- Joseph Morpain
- Maurice Ravel [pupils]
- Édouard Risler [pupils]
- Erik Satie [pupils]

=== Fernande Decruck ===
- Olivier Messiaen

=== Jean-Baptiste Dehesse ===
- Jean-Rémy Marcadet

=== Siegfried Dehn ===
this teacher's teachers
Dehn (1799–1858) studied with teachers including Bernhard Klein.
- Julius Alsleben [pupils]
- Albert Becker
- Ludwig Bussler
- Peter Cornelius
- Mikhail Glinka [pupils]
- Heinrich Hofmann
- Friedrich Kiel [pupils]
- Gustav Nottebohm [pupils]
- Anton Rubinstein
- Ferdinand Schulz
- Friedrich Hieronymus Truhn
- Franz Wüllner [pupils]
- Robert Zimmer (composer) [pupils]

=== Michel Richard Delalande ===
- François Colin de Blamont
- Louis XV

=== Louis Delaquerrière ===
- Paul Franz

=== Carmine de Laurentiis ===
- Carlo Munier

=== Dorothy DeLay ===
- Yehonatan Berick
- Dmitri Berlinsky
- Pavel Berman
- Sarah Chang
- Angèle Dubeau
- Nigel Kennedy
- Misha Keylin
- Chin Kim
- Yoon Kwon
- Li Chuan Yun
- Cho-Liang Lin
- Anne Akiko Meyers
- Midori Goto
- Shlomo Mintz
- Philippe Quint
- Itzhak Perlman
- Nadja Salerno-Sonnenberg
- Kurt Sassmannshaus
- Shunsuke Sato
- Gil Shaham
- Albert Stern
- Akiko Suwanai
- Jaap van Zweden [pupils]

=== Léo Delibes ===
this teacher's teachers
Delibes (1836–1891) studied with teachers including Adolphe Adam and François Benoist.
- Maurice Emmanuel [pupils]
- Émile Jaques-Dalcroze [pupils]
- Spyridon Samaras

=== Frederick Delius ===
this teacher's teachers
Delius (1862–1934) studied with teachers including Salomon Jadassohn, Carl Reinecke, Hans Sitt, and Thomas Ward.
- C.W. Orr
- Peter Warlock

=== Enrico Delle Sedie ===
- Alessandro Bonci
- Ellen Beach Yaw

=== Isabelle Delorme ===
this teacher's teachers
Delorme (1900–1991) studied with teachers including Nadia Boulanger and Claude Champagne.
- Jacques Hétu
- Roger Matton
- François Morel
- André Prévost

=== David Del Tredici ===
this teacher's teachers
Del Tredici (born 1937) studied with teachers including Earl Kim, Roger Sessions, and Seymour Shifrin.
- John Adams
- Mason Bates
- Tom Cipullo
- Leonard J. Lehrman
- Richard St. Clair
- Tison Street
- Randall Woolf

=== Claude Delvincourt ===
this teacher's teachers
Delvincourt (1888–1954) studied with teachers including André Gedalge.
- Jean-Michel Damase

=== Norman Demuth ===
- Norman Fulton
- Gordon Langford
- King Palmer
- Hugh Shrapnel
- Bob Simans

=== Edison Denisov ===
this teacher's teachers
Denisov (1929–1996) studied with teachers including Vladimir Belov, Philip Herschkowitz, Nikolai Rakov, Vissarion Shebalin, and Viktor Tsukkerman.
- Elena Firsova
- Yuri Kasparov
- Dmitri Capyrin
- Sergei Pavlenko
- Dmitri Smirnov
- Ivan Glebovich Sokolov
- Vladimir Tarnopolsky
- Dilorom Saidaminova

=== Edward Joseph Dent ===
- Arthur Bliss
- Arnold Cooke
- Armstrong Gibbs
- Walter Leigh
- Anthony Lewis
- Robin Orr [pupils]
- Philip Radcliffe [pupils]
- Bernard Rose [pupils]
- Bernard Stevens [pupils]
- William Walton
- Stephen Wilkinson

=== Ludwig Deppe ===
- Sister Baptista Battig
- Elizabeth Caland
- C. A. Ehrenfechter
- Amy Fay [pupils]
- Emil von Sauer [pupils]
- Julia Gordon Sauer
- William Hall Sherwood
- Anna Steiniger-Clark
- Sir Donald Tovey

=== Viktor Derevianko ===
this teacher's teachers
Derevianko (1937–) studied with teachers including Heinrich Neuhaus and Maria Yudina.
- Edna Stern

=== Lucette Descaves ===
this teacher's teachers
Descaves (1906–1993) studied with teachers including Marguerite Long and Yves Nat.
- Jean-Claude Éloy
- Brigitte Engerer
- Geneviève Joy
- Katia and Marielle Labèque
- Pascal Rogé
- Jean-Yves Thibaudet

=== Henri Desmarets ===
- Charter Antoine Campion

=== Roger Désormière ===
this teacher's teachers
Désormière (1898–1963) studied with teachers including Vincent d'Indy, Philippe Gaubert, Charles Koechlin, and Xavier Leroux.
- Rene Garriguenc
- Pierre Sancan

=== Yvonne Desportes ===
this teacher's teachers
Desportes (1907–1993) studied with teachers including Alfred Cortot, Paul Dukas, Marcel Dupré, Maurice Emmanuel, Noël Gallon, and Yvonne Lefébure.
- Hasan Ferit Alnar
- Michel Decoust
- Claude Lévy
- Michel Sogny

=== Josquin des Prez ===
- Nicolas Gombert
- Jean l'Héritier

=== Felix Otto Dessoff ===
this teacher's teachers
Dessoff (1835–1892) studied with teachers including Moritz Hauptmann, Ignaz Moscheles, and Julius Rietz.
- Guido Adler [pupils]
- Ignaz Brüll
- Robert Fuchs [pupils]
- Felix Mottl [pupils]
- Arthur Nikisch

=== Max Deutsch ===
this teacher's teachers
Deutsch (1892–1982) studied with teachers including Arnold Schoenberg.
- William Albright [pupils]
- Sylvano Bussotti
- Philippe Capdenat
- John Carewe [pupils]
- Srul Irving Glick
- Sylvia Hallett
- Donald Harris
- György Kurtág
- Eugene Kurtz [pupils]
- Nicholas Maw
- Heinz-Klaus Metzger
- Luis de Pablo
- Allen Shearer
- Verdina Shlonsky [pupils]

=== Orpha-F. Deveaux ===
this teacher's teachers
Deveaux (1872–1933) studied with teachers including Claude Champagne and Alexis Contant.
- Claude Champagne [pupils]
- J.-J. Gagnier
- Paul Pratt

=== Jean Devémy ===
- Simha Arom [pupils]

=== David Diamond ===
this teacher's teachers
Diamond (1915–2005) studied with teachers including Nadia Boulanger and Bernard Rogers.
- Alan Belkin
- Robert Black
- Kendall Durelle Briggs
- Kenneth Fuchs
- Albert Glinsky
- Daron Hagen
- Adolphus Hailstork
- Anthony Iannaccone
- Christopher James
- Philip Lasser
- Lowell Liebermann
- Alasdair MacLean
- Charles Strouse
- Francis Thorne
- Eric Whitacre

=== Peter Dickinson ===
this teacher's teachers
Dickinson (1934–2023) studied with teachers including Philip Radcliffe and Bernard Wagenaar.
- John Abram
- John Casken [pupils]
- Stephen Goss
- Andrew Hugill

=== Emma Lou Diemer ===
this teacher's teachers
Diemer (born 1927) studied with teachers including Howard Hanson and Paul Hindemith.
- Carolyn Bremer

=== Louis Diémer ===
this teacher's teachers
Diémer (1843–1919) studied with teachers including François Benoist, Antoine François Marmontel, and Ambroise Thomas.
- Louis Aubert [pupils]
- Robert Casadesus [pupils]
- Alfredo Casella [pupils]
- Marcel Ciampi
- Alfred Cortot [pupils]
- José Cubiles
- Vincent d'Indy [pupils]
- Gabriel Grovlez
- Lazare Lévy [pupils]
- Robert Lortat
- Yves Nat
- Édouard Risler [pupils]
- Zygmunt Stojowski

=== Joseph Diettenhofer ===
this teacher's teachers
Diettenhofer (ca. 1743–ca.1799) studied with teachers including Joseph Anton Steffan.
- Stephen Francis Rimbault [pupils]

=== Vincent d'Indy ===
this teacher's teachers
d'Indy (1851–1931) studied with teachers including Louis Diémer, César Franck, and Antoine François Marmontel.
- Isaac Albéniz
- Mihail Andricu [pupils]
- Leo Arnaud
- Georges Auric
- Mansi Barberis
- Seth Bingham
- Alfonso Broqua
- Joseph Canteloube
- Pierre Capdevielle
- Dimitrie Cuclin [pupils]
- Jean Daetwyler
- Roger Désormière [pupils]
- Jesús Guridi
- Marguerite Béclard d'Harcourt
- Arthur Honegger [pupils]
- Eugène Lapierre
- Paul Le Flem [pupils]
- Guillaume Lekeu
- Leevi Madetoja
- Albéric Magnard
- Rodolphe Mathieu
- Marcel Mihalovici
- Darius Milhaud [pupils]
- Gösta Nystroem
- Henryk Opieński
- Poldowski
- Armande de Polignac
- Georgios Poniridis
- Cole Porter
- Albert Roussel [pupils]
- Erik Satie [pupils]
- Blanche Selva
- Jules Semler-Collery
- John Laurence Seymour
- Lucijan Marija Škerjanc
- Georges Sporck
- Georges-Émile Tanguay
- Otto Albert Tichý
- Edgard Varèse [pupils]
- Georges Martin Witkowski
- Xian Xinghai
- Emiliana de Zubeldia

=== Carl Ditters von Dittersdorf ===
this teacher's teachers
Dittersdorf (1739–1799) studied with teachers including Giuseppe Bonno.
- František Martin Pecháček [pupils]
- Wenzel Pichl

=== Andrzej Dobrowolski ===
this teacher's teachers
Dobrowolski (1921–1990) studied with teachers including Artur Malawski.
- John Casken [pupils]

=== Theodor Döhler ===
this teacher's teachers
Döhler (1814–1856) studied with teachers including Julius Benedict, Carl Czerny, and Simon Sechter.
- Virginia Gabriel

=== Ernst von Dohnányi ===
this teacher's teachers
Dohnányi (1877–1960) studied with teachers including Hans von Koessler, István Thomán, and Eugen d'Albert.
- Géza Anda
- Béla Bartók [pupils]
- György Cziffra
- Annie Fischer
- Andor Földes
- Ferenc Fricsay
- Boris Goldovsky [pupils]
- Laszlo Halasz [pupils]
- Istvan Kantor
- Edward Kilenyi, Jr.
- Mischa Levitzki
- Ervin Nyiregyházi
- Ľudovít Rajter
- Georg Solti
- Balint Vazsonyi

=== Jakob van Domselaer ===
- Simeon ten Holt

=== Vincenzo di Donato ===
this teacher's teachers
Donato (1887–1967) studied with teachers including Stanislao Falchi, Luigi Forino, Ottorino Respighi, and Giacomo Setaccioli.
- Paul Nani [pupils]
- Goffredo Petrassi [pupils]

=== Franco Donatoni ===
this teacher's teachers
Donatoni (1927–2000) studied with teachers including Goffredo Petrassi and Ildebrando Pizzetti.
- Roberto Andreoni
- Pietro Borradori
- Roberto Carnevale
- Giulio Castagnoli
- Richard Causton [pupils]
- Matteo D'Amico
- Michael Dellaira
- Pascal Dusapin
- Ivan Fedele
- Ric Formosa
- Sandro Gorli
- Magnus Lindberg
- Giorgio Magnanensi
- Luigi Manfrin
- Luca Mosca
- Piero Niro
- Riccardo Piacentini
- Fausto Romitelli
- Esa-Pekka Salonen
- Claudio Scannavini
- Malcolm Singer
- Giuseppe Sinopoli
- Alessandro Solbiati
- Katia Tiutiunnik
- Javier Torres Maldonado
- Juan Trigos
- Giovanni Verrando
- Suzanne Giraud

=== William Done ===
- William Wolstenholme

=== Jakob Dont ===
this teacher's teachers
Dont (1815–1888) studied with teachers including Joseph Böhm and Georg Hellmesberger, Sr..
- Leopold Auer [pupils]
- Philipp Fahrbach Jr.
- Ottokar Nováček

=== Anton Door ===
this teacher's teachers
Door (1833–1919) studied with teachers including Carl Czerny and Simon Sechter.
- Robert Fischhof
- Hans May
- Laura Netzel
- Pavel Pabst [pupils]
- Fritz Steinbach [pupils]
- Remus Vianu [pupils]
- Alexander von Zemlinsky [pupils]

=== Heinrich Dorn ===
this teacher's teachers
Dorn (1804–1892) studied with teachers including Ludwig Berger and Carl Friedrich Zelter.
- Philipp Scharwenka [pupils]
- Robert Schumann [pupils]
- Constantin Sternberg [pupils]
- Benno Stolzenberg [pupils]

=== Louis Dorus ===
- Paul Génin

=== Victor Dourlen ===
this teacher's teachers
Dourlen (1780–1864) studied with teachers including François-Adrien Boieldieu and François-Joseph Gossec.
- Charles-Valentin Alkan [pupils]
- Alexandre Goria
- Henri Herz [pupils]
- Théodore Labarre
- Félix Le Couppey [pupils]
- Antoine François Marmontel [pupils]
- Joseph O'Kelly

=== Ernesto Drangosch ===
this teacher's teachers
(1882 - 1925) studied with teachers including Alberto Williams.
- Honorio Siccardi [pupils]
- Carlo Vidusso [pupils]

=== Sem Dresden ===
this teacher's teachers
Dresden (1881–1957) studied with teachers including Johannes Cornelis Dudok, Hans Pfitzner, Fred Roeske, Felice Togni, and Bernard Zweers.
- Eduard van Beinum
- Cor de Groot
- Jan Mul
- Willem van Otterloo
- Leo Smit
- Marjo Tal
- Maria Elizabeth van Ebbenhorst Tengbergen

=== Alexander Dreyschock ===
- Arkady Abaza [pupils]
- Ella Adayevskaya
- Vilém Blodek
- Ilia Ilyitch Slatinn
- August Winding

=== Jan Drozdowski ===
this teacher's teachers
Drozdowski (1857–1918) studied with teachers including Anton Bruckner, Josef Dachs, Julius Epstein, Josef Hofmann, Aleksander Michałowski, Antoni Płachecki, and Władysław Żeleński.
- Adolf Chybiński [pupils]

=== Jacob Druckman ===
this teacher's teachers
Druckman (1928–1996) studied with teachers including Aaron Copland and Peter Mennin.
- Daniel Asia
- Robert Beaser
- Mark Birnbaum
- Peter Child
- Sidney Corbett
- Robert Cucinotta
- Conrad Cummings
- Michael Daugherty [pupils]
- Donald Fagen
- Anthony Gatto
- Melissa Hui
- Daniel Kellogg
- Aaron Jay Kernis [pupils]
- Douglas Knehans
- Graeme Koehne
- David Lang
- Peter Scott Lewis
- Scott Lindroth
- Jing Jing Luo
- Cindy McTee
- Marc Mellits
- Leon Milo
- Barberi Paull
- Kevin Puts
- Carlos Sanchez-Gutierrez
- Arlene Sierra
- Sheila Silver
- André M. Smith
- Laurie Spiegel
- Pathorn Srikaranonda
- Jan Swafford
- Christopher Theofanidis
- Augusta Read Thomas
- Joseph Waters
- Amnon Wolman
- Carolyn Yarnell

=== Zbigniew Drzewiecki ===
- Ryszard Bakst
- Felicja Blumental
- Walter Buczynski
- Paweł Chęciński
- Halina Czerny-Stefańska
- Jan Ekier [pupils]
- Róża Etkin-Moszkowska
- Lidia Grychtołówna
- Adam Harasiewicz
- Władysław Kędra
- Bolesław Kon
- Hiroko Nakamura
- Edward Olearczyk
- Regina Smendzianka
- Marta Sosińska
- John Tilbury
- Fou Ts'ong
- Roger Woodward
- Eva Maria Zuk

=== Théodore Dubois ===
this teacher's teachers
Dubois (1837–1924) studied with teachers including Ambroise Thomas.
- Pierre de Bréville
- Guillaume Couture
- Gustave Doret
- Paul Dukas [pupils]
- Gabrielle Ferrari
- Louis Ganne
- Reynaldo Hahn [pupils]
- Xavier Leroux [pupils]
- Albéric Magnard
- Henriette Renié
- Édouard Risler [pupils]
- Guy Ropartz
- Spyridon Samaras
- Florent Schmitt
- Charles Silver

=== Alexandre Dubuque ===
this teacher's teachers
Dubuque (1812–1898) studied with teachers including John Field.
- Mily Balakirev [pupils]
- Nikolai Zverev [pupils]

=== Paul Dukas ===
this teacher's teachers
Dukas (1865–1935) studied with teachers including Théodore Dubois, Ernest Guiraud, and Georges Mathias.
- Claude Arrieu
- Tony Aubin [pupils]
- Francis Chagrin
- Georges Dandelot
- Yvonne Desportes [pupils]
- Maurice Duruflé [pupils]
- Koharik Gazarossian
- Jean Langlais [pupils]
- Olivier Messiaen [pupils]
- María de Pablos Cerezo [pupils]
- Walter Piston [pupils]
- Marcel Poot [pupils]
- Mordecai Seter [pupils]
- Edward Staempfli [pupils]
- Achim Stoia
- Tadeusz Szeligowski [pupils]
- Elsa Barraine [pupils]

=== Thomas Dunhill ===
this teacher's teachers
Dunhill (1877–1946) studied with teachers including Walter Parratt, W. S. Rockstro, and Charles Villiers Stanford.
- Arthur Benjamin [pupils]
- George Butterworth
- Norman Demuth
- Angus Morrison [pupils]
- Bernard Shore [pupils]

=== Auguste Dupont ===
this teacher's teachers
Dupont (1827–1890) studied with teachers including Jules Jalheau.
- Émile Mathieu [pupils]

=== Jean-Louis Duport ===
- Nikolaus Kraft
- Jacques-Michel Hurel de Lamare [pupils]

=== Jean-Pierre Duport ===
this teacher's teachers
J.-P. Duport (1741–1818) studied with teachers including Martin Berteau.
- Frederick William II

=== Marcel Dupré ===
this teacher's teachers
Dupré (1886–1971) studied with teachers including Alexandre Guilmant and Lazare Lévy.
- Jean-Michel Damase
- Fernande Decruck
- Yvonne Desportes [pupils]
- Rolande Falcinelli [pupils]
- André Fleury
- Virgil Fox
- Jean Langlais [pupils]
- Olivier Messiaen [pupils]
- Michael Murray
- Françoise Renet

=== Gilbert Duprez ===
this teacher's teachers
Duprez (1806–1896) studied with teachers including Alexandre-Étienne Choron.
- Albert Niemann

=== Jacques Dupuis ===
this teacher's teachers
Dupuis (1830–1870) studied with teachers including François Prume.
- César Thomson [pupils]

=== Sylvain Dupuis ===
- Henriette van den Boorn-Coclet

=== Édouard Du Puy ===
this teacher's teachers
Du Puy (1770–1822) studied with teachers including Carl Friedrich Christian Fasch.
- Franz Berwald [pupils]

=== Émile Durand ===
this teacher's teachers
Durand (1830–1903) studied with teachers including François Bazin.
- Clément Broutin
- Claude Debussy [pupils]
- Camille Erlanger
- Gabriel Pierné
- Arthur Goring Thomas
- Jules Auguste Wiernsberger

=== Angelo Durante ===
- Domenico Sarro
- Francesco Durante [pupils]

=== Francesco Durante ===
this teacher's teachers
Durante (1684–1755) studied with teachers including Bernardo Pasquini, Angelo Durante, Gaetano Greco, Giuseppe Ottavio Pitoni, and Alessandro Scarlatti.
- Fedele Fenaroli [pupils]
- Pietro Alessandro Guglielmi
- Niccolò Jommelli [pupils]
- Giovanni Paisiello
- Giovanni Battista Pergolesi
- Niccolò Piccinni
- Antonio Sacchini [pupils]
- Leonardo Vinci

=== Matthias Durst ===
this teacher's teachers
Durst (1815–1875) studied with teachers including Joseph Böhm and Georg Hellmesberger, Sr..
- Carl Heissler [pupils]

=== Maurice Duruflé ===
this teacher's teachers
Duruflé (1902–1986) studied with teachers including Georges Caussade, Paul Dukas, César-Abel Estyle, Jean Gallon, Noël Gallon, Eugène Gigout, Alexandre Guilmant, Charles Tournemire, and Louis Vierne.
- Pierre Cochereau
- Jean Guillou
- Marie-Claire Alain

=== František Xaver Dušek ===
this teacher's teachers
Dušek (1731–1799) studied with teachers including Franz Habermann and Georg Christoph Wagenseil.
- Josepha Duschek
- Leopold Koželuch [pupils]
- Vincenc Mašek

=== Jan Ladislav Dussek ===
- George Onslow

=== Sophia Dussek ===
- Olivia Buckley

=== Henri Dutilleux ===
this teacher's teachers
Dutilleux (1916–2013) studied with teachers including Henri Büsser, Maurice Emmanuel, Jean Gallon, and Noël Gallon.
- Derek Bermel
- Alain Gagnon
- Gérard Grisey [pupils]
- Kenneth Hesketh [pupils]
- Jacques Hétu
- André Prévost
- David Sampson

=== Henri Duvernois ===
this teacher's teachers
Duvernois (1875–1937) studied with teachers including unknown .
- Luis Pacheco de Céspedes

=== Alphonse Duvernoy ===
this teacher's teachers
Duvernoy (1842–1907) studied with teachers including Auguste Barbereau, François Bazin, and Antoine François Marmontel.
- Norah Drewett de Kresz
- Alexander Winkler [pupils]

=== Antonín Dvořák ===
this teacher's teachers
Dvořák (1841–1904) studied with teachers including Josef Krejčí.
- Will Marion Cook
- William Arms Fisher
- Rudolf Friml
- Rubin Goldmark [pupils]
- Harvey Worthington Loomis
- Oskar Nedbal
- Vítězslav Novák [pupils]
- Harry Rowe Shelley [pupils]
- Maurice Arnold Strothotte
- Herma Studeny
- Josef Suk
- John Stepan Zamecnik

=== John Arthur St. Oswald Dykes ===
this teacher's teachers
Dykes (1863-1948) studied with teachers including Joachim Raff and Clara Schumann.
- Richard Arnell [pupils]
- Rutland Boughton
- Percy Buck [pupils]
- Cynthia Colville
- Leslie Fly
- Frank Tapp

=== George Dyson ===
this teacher's teachers
Dyson (1883–1964) studied with teachers including Hubert Parry and Charles Villiers Stanford.
- Amice Calverley
- Imogen Holst
- Robin Hull
- Constant Lambert [pupils]

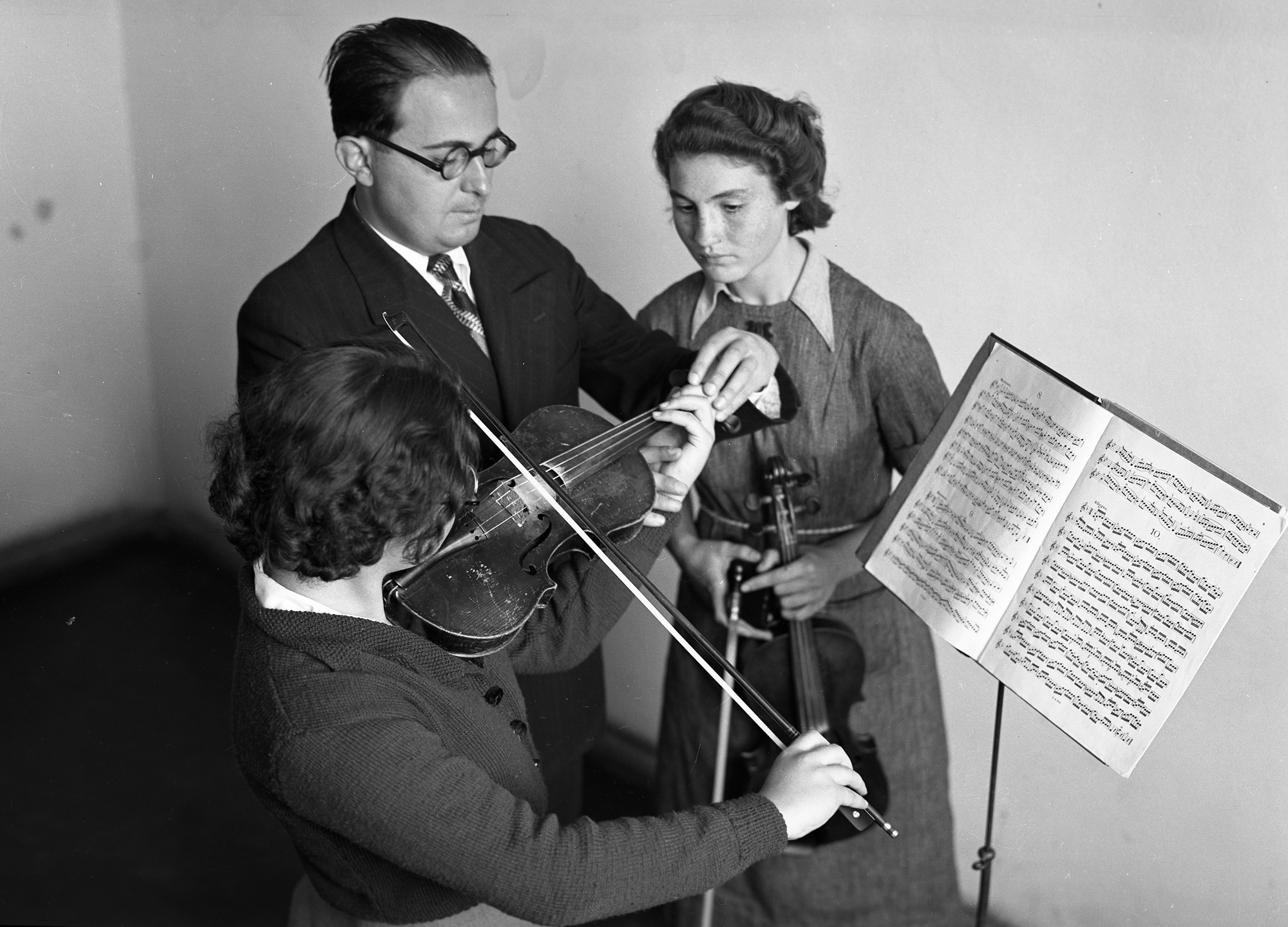

== E ==
=== John Eaton ===
this teacher's teachers
Eaton (born 1935) studied with teachers including Milton Babbitt, Edward T. Cone, and Roger Sessions.
- Chaya Czernowin [pupils]
- Eugene O'Brien [pupils]

=== Johann Ernst Eberlin ===
this teacher's teachers
Eberlin (1702–1762) studied with teachers including Balthasar Siberer.
- Anton Cajetan Adlgasser

=== Carl Eberwein ===
- Hans von Bülow [pupils]

=== Franz Eck ===
this teacher's teachers
Eck (1776–c.1810) studied with teachers including Friedrich Johann Eck.
- Louis Spohr [pupils]

=== Friedrich Johann Eck ===
this teacher's teachers
Eck (1767–1838) studied with teachers including Christian Danner.
- Franz Eck [pupils]

=== Clarence Eddy ===
- James Hotchkiss Rogers

=== Alexander Edelmann ===
this teacher's teachers
Edelmann (1904–1995) studied with teachers including Heinrich Neuhaus.

=== Jean-Frédéric Edelmann ===
- Louis Adam [pupils]
- Étienne Méhul [pupils]

=== Gilles van den Eeden ===
- Ludwig van Beethoven [pupils]

=== İsmail Dede Efendi ===
- Hampartsoum Limondjian

=== Galina Eguiazarova ===
- Martín García [pupils]
- Juan Pérez [pupils]
- María Stembólskaya [pupils]
- Marina Tchebourkina [pupils]

=== Abel Ehrlich ===
- Tzvi Avni
- Chaya Czernowin [pupils]

=== Heinrich Ehrlich ===
- Paul Marsop

=== Herbert Eimert ===
this teacher's teachers
Eimert (1897–1972) studied with teachers including Hermann Abendroth and August von Othegraven.
- Serge Tcherepnin [pupils]

=== Severin Eisenberger ===
- Herbert Haufrecht
- Sylvia Straus Heschel
- Heinrich Kaminski
- Lili Kraus
- Vivien Harvey Slater

=== Antonín Eiser ===
- Vilém Blodek

=== Karl Karlovich Eisrich ===
this teacher's teachers
K. K. Eisrich (1807–1881) studied with teachers including unknown .
- Mily Balakirev [pupils]

=== Jan Ekier ===
this teacher's teachers
Ekier (1913–2014) studied with teachers including Zbigniew Drzewiecki and Kazimierz Sikorski.
- Yuko Kawai
- Piotr Paleczny

=== Bram Eldering ===
this teacher's teachers
Eldering (1865–1943) studied with teachers including Jenő Hubay and Joseph Joachim.
- Siegfried Borries [pupils]
- Adolf Busch [pupils]
- Willem van Hoogstraten [pupils]
- Karl Reitz [pupils]
- Leon Sametini [pupils]
- Wilhelm Stross [pupils]
- Max Strub [pupils]

=== Edward Elgar ===
- John Alden Carpenter

=== Brian Elias ===
this teacher's teachers
Elias (born 1948) studied with teachers including Elisabeth Lutyens, Humphrey Searle, and Bernard Stevens.
- Darren Bloom
- Joby Talbot

=== Ernst Ellberg ===
- Gunnar de Frumerie [pupils]
- Hilding Rosenberg [pupils]
- Viktor Widqvist

=== Heino Eller ===
this teacher's teachers
Eller (1887–1970) studied with teachers including Mikhail Chernov, Alexander Glazunov, Vasily Kalafati, and Maximilian Steinberg.
- Arvo Pärt
- Eduard Tubin
- Jaan Rääts
- Helen Tobias-Duesberg

=== Catharinus Elling ===
- Fartein Valen [pupils]

=== Józef Elsner ===
- Frédéric Chopin [pupils]
- Ignacy Feliks Dobrzyński
- Maria Agata Szymanowska

=== George Elvey ===
this teacher's teachers
Elvey (1816–1893) studied with teachers including William Crotch, Stephen Elvey, and Cipriani Potter.
- Frederick Bridge [pupils]
- Hubert Parry [pupils]

=== Stephen Elvey ===
this teacher's teachers
Elvey (1805–1860) studied with teachers including Highmore Skeats.
- George Elvey [pupils]
- Frederick Ouseley [pupils]

=== Antoine Elwart ===
this teacher's teachers
Elwart (1808–1877) studied with teachers including François-Joseph Fétis, Jean-François Le Sueur, and Anton Reicha.
- Théodore Gouvy
- Aimé Maillart
- Olivier Métra
- Émile Prudent
- Victor Frédéric Verrimst
- Jean-Baptiste Weckerlin

=== Herbert Elwell ===
this teacher's teachers
Elwell (1898–1974) studied with teachers including Nadia Boulanger.
- Roger Goeb
- Howard Swanson

=== Paul Emerich ===
- Erich Leinsdorf

=== Maurice Emmanuel ===
this teacher's teachers
Emmanuel (1862–1938) studied with teachers including Louis-Albert Bourgault-Ducoudray, Léo Delibes, Théodore Dubois, César Franck, and Ernest Guiraud.
- Yvonne Desportes [pupils]
- Henri Dutilleux [pupils]
- Marguerite Béclard d'Harcourt
- Yvonne Hubert
- Olivier Messiaen [pupils]
- Simone Plé-Caussade [pupils]
- Joaquín Rodrigo

=== George Enescu ===
this teacher's teachers
Enescu (1881–1955) studied with teachers including Gabriel Fauré, Robert Fuchs, Joseph Hellmesberger, Jr., and Martin Pierre Marsick.
- Serge Blanc
- Marius Constant
- Christian Ferras
- Joan Field
- Ivry Gitlis
- Arthur Grumiaux [pupils]
- Ida Haendel
- Yehudi Menuhin [pupils]
- Michel Schwalbé [pupils]
- Ljerko Spiller [pupils]
- Uto Ughi
- Eugenia Umińska

=== Gustav Engel ===
- Therese Malten

=== Julius Epstein ===
this teacher's teachers
Epstein (1832–1926) studied with teachers including Vatroslav Lichtenegger, Johann Rufinatscha, and Anton Halm.
- Benito Bersa
- Ignaz Brüll
- Jan Drozdowski [pupils]
- Theodor Fuchs [pupils]
- Mathilde Kralik
- Gustav Mahler [pupils]
- Ede Poldini
- Richard Robert [pupils]
- Marcella Sembrich
- Clara E. Thoms

=== Donald Erb ===
this teacher's teachers
Erb (1927–2008) studied with teachers including Nadia Boulanger, Kenneth Gaburo, and Bernhard Heiden.
- Margaret Brouwer
- Cindy Cox
- Nickitas J. Demos
- Houston Dunleavy
- David Felder
- Joseph Hallman
- John S. Hilliard
- Christopher Hopkins [pupils]
- John Krol
- Leonard J. Lehrman
- John Mackey
- William Neil
- Eugene O'Brien [pupils]
- Greg Onofrio
- Nikola Resanovic
- Jeffrey Ryan
- Jerod Impichchaachaaha' Tate

=== Eduard Erdmann ===
this teacher's teachers
Erdmann (1896–1958) studied with teachers including Conrad Ansorge and Heinz Tiessen.
- Aloys and Alfons Kontarsky

=== Robert Erickson ===
this teacher's teachers
Erickson (1917–1997) studied with teachers including Ernst Krenek and Roger Sessions.
- Paul Dresher
- David Felder
- Brenda Hutchinson [pupils]
- Terry Jennings
- Lam Bun-Ching
- Alexina Louie
- Dary John Mizelle
- Pauline Oliveros [pupils]
- Terry Riley [pupils]
- Loren Rush
- Ramon Sender
- Charles Shere
- Allen Strange
- John Warthen Struble
- Morton Subotnick [pupils]
- Nicolas Vérin

=== Achille Errani ===
- Emma Cecilia Thursby

=== Paul Ertel ===
this teacher's teachers
Ertel (1865– 1933) studied with teachers including Louis Brassin, Julius Tauwitz, and Franz Liszt.
- Marion Bauer [pupils]

=== Nicolás Ruiz Espadero ===
- Ignacio Cervantes [pupils]
- Carlos Alfredo Peyrellade

=== Michele Esposito ===
this teacher's teachers
Esposito (1855–1929) studied with teachers including Beniamino Cesi and Paolo Serrao.
- Frank Ll. Harrison
- Hamilton Harty
- John F. Larchet
- Frederick May
- Enid Starkie

=== César-Abel Estyle ===
this teacher's teachers
Estyle (1877–1961) studied with teachers including .
- Fernande Decruck [pupils]
- Maurice Duruflé [pupils]
- Rolande Falcinelli [pupils]
- Yvonne Loriod [pupils]
- Olivier Messiaen [pupils]
- Simone Plé-Caussade [pupils]
- Marcelle Soulage [pupils]

=== José Evangelista ===
- Analia Llugdar
- Samy Moussa
- Ana Sokolovic

=== Camille Everardi ===
this teacher's teachers
Everardi (1824–1899) studied with teachers including Manuel García.
- Arkady Abaza [pupils]
- Nikolay Figner
- Fyodor Stravinsky

== F ==
=== Werner Fabricius ===
this teacher's teachers
Fabricius studied with teachers including Heinrich Scheidemann and Thomas Selle.
- Johann Friedrich Alberti [pupils]

=== Lorenzo Fago ===
this teacher's teachers
Fago (1704–1793) studied with teachers including Nicola Fago.
- Pasquale Cafaro [pupils]

=== Nicola Fago ===
this teacher's teachers
Fago (1677–1745) studied with teachers including Francesco Provenzale.
- Pasquale Cafaro [pupils]
- Lorenzo Fago [pupils]
- Michele de Falco
- Francesco Feo [pupils]
- Carmine Giordani
- Niccolo Jommelli
- Leonardo Leo [pupils]
- Giuseppe de Majo
- Nicola Sala [pupils]

=== Stanislao Falchi ===
this teacher's teachers
Falchi (1851–1922) studied with teachers including Celestino Magi, Salvatore Meluzzi, and Ettore Pinelli.
- Vincenzo di Donato [pupils]
- Vittorio Gui [pupils]
- Bernardino Molinari
- Vincenzo Tommasini

=== Rolande Falcinelli ===
this teacher's teachers
Falcinelli (1920–2006) studied with teachers including Henri Büsser, Marcel Dupré, César-Abel Estyle, Isidor Philipp, Simone Plé-Caussade, and Marcel Samuel-Rousseau.
- Thierry Escaich
- Odile Pierre
- Pierre Pincemaille [pupils]
- Daniel Roth

=== Manuel de Falla ===
this teacher's teachers
Falla (1876–1946) studied with teachers including Felip Pedrell.
- Rosa García Ascot [pupils]
- Ernesto Halffter
- Antonio María Valencia

=== Alexander Famintsyn ===
- Ella Adayevskaya

=== Harold Farberman ===
this teacher's teachers
Farberman (born 1929) studied with teachers including Milton Babbitt, Luciano Berio, Aaron Copland, and Lukas Foss.
- Marin Alsop
- Leon Botstein
- Ronald Caltabiano
- Peter Oundjian
- Michael Jeffrey Shapiro
- Reona Ito
- Juan Gallastegui

=== Antonio Farini ===
- Marie Selika Williams
- Sampson Williams

=== Harry Farjeon ===
this teacher's teachers
Harry Farjeon (1878–1948) studied with teachers including Battison Haynes, Frederick Corder, and Landon Ronald.
- Mary Chandler
- Christian Darnton
- Daniel Jones
- Reginald King
- George Lloyd
- Geraldine Mucha
- Steve Race
- Phyllis Tate

=== Ferenc Farkas ===
this teacher's teachers
Farkas (1905–2000) studied with teachers including Leó Weiner and Albert Siklós.
- Zsolt Durkó

=== Henry Farmer ===
this teacher's teachers
Farmer (1819–1891) studied with teachers including Henry Bishop and J. Wade Thirlwall.
- John Farmer [pupils]
- Alfred Gibson

=== John Farmer ===
this teacher's teachers
Farmer (1835–1901) studied with teachers including Henry Farmer, Moritz Hauptmann, Ignaz Moscheles, Louis Plaidy, Ernst Richter, and Andreas Spaeth.
- Edward Bairstow [pupils]

=== Ernest Farrar ===
this teacher's teachers
Farrar (1885–1918) studied with teachers including Walter Parratt and Charles Villiers Stanford.
- Gerald Finzi

=== Arthur Farwell ===
this teacher's teachers
Farwell (1872–1952) studied with teachers including Engelbert Humperdinck.
- Roy Harris [pupils]
- Dika Newlin

=== Carl Friedrich Christian Fasch ===
this teacher's teachers
C. F. Fasch (1736–1800) studied with teachers including Johann Friedrich Fasch, Johann Wilhelm Hertel, and Carl Höckh.
- Édouard Du Puy [pupils]
- Carl Friedrich Zelter [pupils]

=== Johann Friedrich Fasch ===
this teacher's teachers
J. F. Fasch (1688–1758) studied with teachers including Johann Kuhnau and Johann Schelle.
- Carl Friedrich Christian Fasch [pupils]

=== Gabriel Fauré ===
this teacher's teachers
Fauré (1845–1924) studied with teachers including Louis Niedermeyer and Camille Saint-Saëns.
- Lili Boulanger
- Mihail Andricu [pupils]
- Louis Aubert
- Lili Boulanger
- Nadia Boulanger [pupils]
- Alfredo Casella [pupils]
- Luis Pacheco de Céspedes
- George Enescu [pupils]
- Henry Février [pupils]
- Gabriel Grovlez [pupils]
- Fernand Halphen [pupils]
- Jacques Ibert
- Émile Jaques-Dalcroze [pupils]
- Dumitru Georgescu Kiriac [pupils]
- Charles Koechlin [pupils]
- Paul Ladmirault
- Raoul Laparra
- Maurice Le Boucher [pupils]
- Maurice Ravel [pupils]
- Cemal Reşit Rey [pupils]
- Jean Roger-Ducasse
- Florent Schmitt
- Germaine Thyssens-Valentin
- Louis Vuillemin

=== André Joseph Fauvel ===
- Pierre Rode [pupils]

=== Amy Fay ===
this teacher's teachers
Fay (1844–1928) studied with teachers including Ludwig Deppe, Theodor Kullak, Franz Liszt, and Carl Tausig.
- Harriet Brower [pupils]
- John Alden Carpenter

=== Ilona Fehér ===
this teacher's teachers
Fehér (1901–1988) studied with teachers including Joseph Bloch and Jenő Hubay.
- Shmuel Ashkenasi [pupils]
- Yehonatan Berick
- Yoel Levi
- Shlomo Mintz
- Itzhak Perlman [pupils]
- Yaakov Rubinstein
- Hagai Shaham
- Pinchas Zukerman [pupils]

=== David Felder ===
this teacher's teachers
Felder (born 1953) studied with teachers including Donald Erb, Robert Erickson, Roger Reynolds, and Bernard Rands.
- Kedarnath Awati
- Roberto Azaretto
- Christian Baldini
- Daniel Bassin
- Trevor Bjorklund
- Eliav Brand
- Megan Buegger
- Aubrey Byerly
- Aaron Cassidy
- Emiliano Cerro
- Matthew Chamberlain
- Derek Charke
- Weijun Chen
- Igor Coelho Marques
- Douglas Cohen
- Juan Colon-Hernandez
- Jessie Downs
- Houston Dunleavy
- Adrienne Elisha
- Paul Elwood
- Mara Gibson
- Steve Gibson
- Meredith Gilna
- Edgar Girtain
- Jonathan Golove
- Jacob Gotlib
- Esin Gunduz
- Vincent Hammer
- Haesook Han
- Emil Harnas
- Clinton Haycraft
- Brien Henderson
- Tomas Henriques
- Nathan Heidelberger
- Alex Huddleston
- Hye Jeong-Lee
- Soo Ran [pupils]
- Evan Johnson
- Keith Johnson
- Lyle Johnson
- Jiyoung Jung
- David Kim-Boyle
- Rama Kolesnikow
- Joe Lake
- Mark Mantel
- Leonard Manzara
- Zane Merritt
- Sam Mirelman
- Leah Muir
- Otto Muller
- Gabriella Nechita
- Erik Oña
- Pang Chun-Ting
- Dimitar Pentchev
- Robert Phillips
- Nora Ponte
- David Rappenecker
- Bob Rice
- Alejandro Rutty
- Rick Sanford
- Matt Sargent
- Kenichi Seaki
- Chung Shih-Hoh
- Moshe Shulman
- Yngve Slettholm
- Diana Soh
- David Squires
- Eleanor Trawick
- Colin Tucker
- Andrew Walsh
- Carter Williams
- Michael Zajonc
- Matias Homar
- John Aulich
- Joel Kirk
- Alex Buehler
- James Falzone
- Jonathan Rainous
- Lihuen Sirvent

=== Morton Feldman ===
this teacher's teachers
Feldman (1926–1987) studied with teachers including Wallingford Riegger and Stefan Wolpe.
- Craig Bove
- Joseph Byrd
- Gyula Csapó [pupils]
- Julius Eastman
- Barbara Monk Feldman
- Mamoru Fujieda
- Orlando Jacinto Garcia
- Peter Gena
- Talib Rasul Hakim [pupils]
- Christos Hatzis [pupils]
- Nicolas Hodges [pupils]
- Tom Johnson
- Joëlle Léandre
- Fred Lonberg-Holm
- Kevin Malone
- Bunita Marcus
- Bobby Previte
- Richard Rijnvos
- Margaret Scoville
- Rodney Sharman
- Elliott Sharp
- Bernadette Speach
- Norma Tyer
- Nils Vigeland
- Kevin Volans

=== Fedele Fenaroli ===
this teacher's teachers
Fenaroli (1730–1818) studied with teachers including Francesco Durante.
- Domenico Cimarosa
- Michael Kelly
- Francesco Lanza [pupils]
- Vincenzo Lavigna [pupils]
- Saverio Mercadante [pupils]
- Luigi Mosca
- Giuseppe Nicolini
- Stefano Pavesi
- Francesco Ruggi [pupils]
- Niccolò Antonio Zingarelli [pupils]

=== Vincenzo Fenzi ===
this teacher's teachers
Fenzi (1788–1827) studied with teachers including Unknown .
- Gaetano Ciandelli [pupils]

=== Francesco Feo ===
- Matteo Capranica
- Giacomo Insanguine
- Niccolò Jommelli [pupils]
- Gian Francesco de Majo
- Gennaro Manna
- Giovanni Battista Pergolesi
- Nicola Sabatino

=== Donald Ferguson ===
- Ross Lee Finney [pupils]
- John Verrall [pupils]

=== Howard Ferguson ===
this teacher's teachers
Ferguson (1908–1999) studied with teachers including R. O. Morris, Malcolm Sargent, and Ralph Vaughan Williams.
- Richard Rodney Bennett
- Francis Burt [pupils]
- Cornelius Cardew [pupils]
- Hubert du Plessis
- John Joubert [pupils]
- Ian Kellam [pupils]

=== Brian Ferneyhough ===
this teacher's teachers
Ferneyhough (born 1943) studied with teachers including Klaus Huber and Ton de Leeuw.

[[ ]] [pupils]

- Mark Applebaum
- Sandeep Bhagwati
- Maia Ciobanu
- Franklin Cox
- Chaya Czernowin [pupils]
- Joël-François Durand
- Ivo van Emmerik
- James Erber
- Andrew Greenwald
- Kristian Ireland
- Kurt Isaacson
- Tomi Räisänen
- Roger Redgate
- Richard Rijnvos
- Kaija Saariaho
- Manfred Stahnke
- Hans Thomalla
- Suzanne Giraud
- Younghi Pagh-Paan
- Bert Van Herck

=== François-Joseph Fétis ===
this teacher's teachers
Fétis (1784–1871) studied with teachers including François-Adrien Boieldieu.
- Luigi Agnesi
- Jean-Delphin Alard [pupils]
- Juan Crisóstomo Arriaga
- Peter Benoit [pupils]
- Louise Bertin
- William Cusins [pupils]
- Julius Eichberg
- Antoine Elwart [pupils]
- Manuel García, Jr. [pupils]
- Ferdinand Hérold
- Frantz Jehin-Prume
- Jacques-Nicolas Lemmens [pupils]
- Victor Magnien [pupils]
- George Alexander Osborne
- Adolphe Samuel
- Charles-Marie Widor [pupils]

=== Paul Fetler ===
this teacher's teachers
Fetler (born 1920, died 2018) studied with teachers including Boris Blacher, Paul Hindemith, and Quincy Porter.
- Carol E. Barnett
- Donald Keats [pupils]
- Libby Larsen
- Richard Marriott
- Stephen Paulus
- Eric Stokes [pupils]

=== Jacques Février ===
this teacher's teachers
Février (1900–1979) studied with teachers including Marguerite Long and Édouard Risler.
- Michèle Boegner
- Albert Alan Owen
- Alain Planès
- Robert Sherlaw Johnson [pupils]
- Gabriel Tacchino
- Valerie Tryon
- Peter Wallfisch [pupils]

=== Pierre Février ===
this teacher's teachers
Février (1696–1760) studied with teachers including Unknown .
- Claude Balbastre [pupils]

=== Carlo Fiamingo ===
this teacher's teachers
Fiamingo (1881–1961) studied with teachers including Giuseppe Vella.
- Paul Nani [pupils]
- Carmelo Pace [pupils]

=== Zdeněk Fibich ===
this teacher's teachers
Fibich (1850–1900) studied with teachers including Salomon Jadassohn, Vinzenz Lachner, and Ignaz Moscheles.
- Emanuel Chvála
- Karel Kovařovic
- Zdeněk Nejedlý
- Otakar Ostrčil
- Roman Freiherr von Procházka
- Václav Suk

=== John Field ===
this teacher's teachers
Field (1782–1837) studied with teachers including Tommaso Giordani, Muzio Clementi, and Johann Georg Albrechtsberger.
- Alexandre Dubuque [pupils]
- Francesco Lanza [pupils]
- Anton Gerke [pupils]
- Mikhail Glinka [pupils]
- Antoine de Kontski [pupils]
- Charles Mayer [pupils]
- Charles Neate [pupils]
- Alexander Villoing [pupils]

=== Irving Fine ===
this teacher's teachers
Fine (1914–1962) studied with teachers including Nadia Boulanger, Edward Burlingame Hill, Serge Koussevitzky, and Walter Piston.
- Elaine Barkin
- Gustav Ciamaga
- Halim El-Dabh
- Karl Kohn [pupils]
- Noël Lee
- Joel Mandelbaum
- Allen Sapp
- Richard Wernick [pupils]

=== John Finlayson ===
this teacher's teachers
Finlayson (1810–1882) studied with teachers including unknown .
- Robert Prescott Stewart [pupils]

=== Ross Lee Finney ===
this teacher's teachers
Finney (1906–1997) studied with teachers including Alban Berg, Nadia Boulanger, Edward Burlingame Hill, and Roger Sessions.
- William Albright [pupils]
- Robert Ashley [pupils]
- Leslie Bassett [pupils]
- Stephen Chatman
- Robert Cogan
- George Crumb [pupils]
- Aldo Rafael Forte
- Donald Harris
- Philip Krumm
- Michael Kurek
- Robert Morris [pupils]
- Gordon Mumma [pupils]
- Alice Procter
- Donald Sosin
- Roger Reynolds [pupils]
- Richard Toensing
- Roland Trogan
- George Balch Wilson
- Rolv Yttrehus

=== Pietro Antonio Fiocco ===
- Joseph-Hector Fiocco

=== Giovanni Andrea Fioroni ===
this teacher's teachers
Fioroni (1716–1778) studied with teachers including Leonardo Leo.
- Vincenzo Manfredini
- Agostino Quaglia
- Alessandro Rolla [pupils]
- Giovanni Bernardo Zucchinetti

=== Rudolf Firkušný ===
this teacher's teachers
Firkušný (1912–1994) studied with teachers including Vilém Kurz and Artur Schnabel.
- Carlisle Floyd

=== Edwin Fischer ===
this teacher's teachers
E. Fischer (1886–1960) studied with teachers including Martin Krause.
- Katja Andy
- Paul Badura-Skoda
- Stefan Bardas
- Daniel Barenboim
- Sebastian Benda
- Joan Benson
- Rita Bouboulidi
- Alfred Brendel
- Sequeira Costa
- Harry Datyner
- Jörg Demus
- Lyuba Entcheva
- Cécile Staub Genhart
- George Hadjinikos
- Conrad Hansen
- Hubert Harry
- Veronica Jochum
- Gernot Kahl
- Lionel Nowak
- Niels Johann Østbye
- Helena Sá e Costa
- Ronald Smith
- Sidney Sukoenig
- Grete Sultan
- Liliane Wille

=== Johann Christian Fischer ===
- A. Sallantin
- Charles J. Suck

=== Michael Gotthard Fischer ===
this teacher's teachers
M. G. Fischer (1773–1829) studied with teachers including Johann Christian Kittel.
- Albrecht Agthe [pupils]

=== Joseph Fischhof ===
- Leopold von Meyer

=== Josepha von Fladt ===
this teacher's teachers
Fladt (1778–1843) studied with teachers including Franz Danzi, Joseph Graetz, Franz Lauska, and Abbé Vogler.
- Adolf von Henselt [pupils]
- Rudolf Joseph Schachner

=== Carl Flesch ===
this teacher's teachers
Flesch (1873–1944) studied with teachers including Jakob Grün, Martin Pierre Marsick, and Eugène Sauzay.
- Janine Andrade
- Edwin Bélanger
- Josef Gingold
- Ivry Gitlis
- Szymon Goldberg
- Ida Haendel [pupils]
- Josef Hassid [pupils]
- Isolde Menges [pupils]
- Alma Moodie [pupils]
- Yfrah Neaman [pupils]
- Ginette Neveu [pupils]
- Ricardo Odnoposoff
- Corrado Romano
- Eric Rosenblith
- Max Rostal [pupils]
- Wolfgang Schocken
- Henryk Szeryng [pupils]
- Henri Temianka
- Roman Totenberg
- Josef Wolfsthal

=== Stanley Fletcher ===
- Malcolm Bilson

=== Marie Mauté de Fleurville ===
this teacher's teachers
Fleurville (?) studied with teachers including Frédéric Chopin.
- Claude Debussy [pupils]

=== Carlisle Floyd ===
- Mark Adamo [pupils]
- Craig Bohmler [pupils]
- Michael Ching [pupils]
- Jake Heggie [pupils]

=== Free Focke ===
- Juan Allende-Blin

=== Josef Bohuslav Foerster ===
this teacher's teachers
Foerster (1859–1951) studied with teachers including František Zdeněk Skuherský.
- Karel Boleslav Jirák [pupils]
- Jaroslav Řídký [pupils]

=== Ferdinando Forino ===
this teacher's teachers
Ferdinando Forino (1837–1905) studied with teachers including Gaetano Ciandelli.
- Cesare Bedetti
- Luigi Forino [pupils]

=== Luigi Forino ===
this teacher's teachers
Luigi Forino (1868–1936) studied with teachers including Ferdinando Forino.
- Amedeo Escobar
- Newton Pádua

=== Emanuel Aloys Förster ===
- Georg Hellmesberger, Sr. [pupils]
- Joseph Mayseder [pupils]
- Charles Neate [pupils]
- Louis Niedermeyer [pupils]
- Franz Pecháček
- Andrey Razumovsky
- Carl Andreas Stein

=== Wolfgang Fortner ===
this teacher's teachers
Fortner (1907–1987) studied with teachers including Hermann Grabner.
- Friedhelm Döhl
- Hans Ulrich Engelmann
- Hans Werner Henze [pupils]
- Milko Kelemen [pupils]
- Rudolf Kelterborn
- Fred Lerdahl [pupils]
- Nam June Paik
- Graciela Paraskevaidis
- Robert H.P. Platz
- Wolfgang Rihm [pupils]
- Mauricio Rosenmann Taub
- Manfred Stahnke
- Peter Westergaard [pupils]
- Hans Wollschläger
- Hans Zender
- Bernd Alois Zimmermann [pupils]
- Heinz Werner Zimmermann

=== Lukas Foss ===
this teacher's teachers
Foss (1922–2009) studied with teachers including Noël Gallon, Paul Hindemith, Lazare Lévy, Rosario Scalero, Richard Stöhr, and Isabelle Vengerova.
- José Antônio Rezende de Almeida Prado
- Edward Applebaum
- Robert Beaser
- Jeremy Beck
- Norma Beecroft
- Daniel Beliavsky
- Lauren Bernofsky
- Harold Boatrite
- Benjamin Boretz [pupils]
- Benjamin C. S. Boyle
- Philip Cashian
- Noah Creshevsky
- Nancy Bloomer Deussen
- Rocco Di Pietro
- Richard Dufallo
- Julius Eastman
- Jack Elliott
- Harold Farberman
- Hormoz Farhat
- Jay Gottlieb
- Jorge Villavicencio Grossmann
- Daron Hagen
- Jacques Hétu
- Michael Horvit
- Douglas Knehans
- Barbara Kolb
- Wen-Pin Hope Lee
- Alvin Lucier [pupils]
- Apostolos Paraskevas
- Mauricio Pauly
- Faye-Ellen Silverman
- Ivana Marburger Themmen
- Augusta Read Thomas
- Nils Vigeland no [pupils]
- Charles Wilson
- Raymond Yiu

=== Jean Fournet ===
- Marius Constant

=== Pierre Fournier ===
this teacher's teachers
Fournier (1906–1986) studied with teachers including Paul Bazelaire, André Hekking, and Odette Krettly.
- Julian Lloyd Webber
- Rocco Filippini

=== Frederick A. Fox ===
this teacher's teachers
Fox (1931–2011) studied with teachers including Bernhard Heiden.
- Robert Paterson

=== Petronio Franceschini ===
this teacher's teachers
Franceschini (1651–1680) studied with teachers including Giuseppe Corsi da Celano and Giacomo Antonio Perti.
- Domenico Gabrielli [pupils]

=== Arnold Franchetti ===
this teacher's teachers
Franceschini (1911–1993) studied with teachers including Alberto Franchetti and Richard Strauss.
- Robert Lombardo [pupils]

=== César Franck ===
this teacher's teachers
Franck (1822–1890) studied with teachers including François Benoist, Joseph Daussoigne-Méhul, François Habeneck, Anton Reicha, and Pierre-Joseph-Guillaume Zimmermann.
- Henri Büsser [pupils]
- Ernest Chausson
- Henri Dallier [pupils]
- Henri Duparc
- Maurice Emmanuel [pupils]
- Louis Ganne
- Augusta Holmès
- Vincent d'Indy [pupils]
- Guillaume Lekeu
- André Pirro [pupils]
- Henri Quittard [pupils]
- Alice Sauvrezis
- Louis Vierne [pupils]
- Alberto Williams [pupils]
- Raymond Huntington Woodman

=== Friedrich Wilhelm Franke ===
- Volkmar Andreae [pupils]
- Alfred Sittard

=== Benjamin Frankel ===
- Buxton Orr

=== Ignaz Fränzl ===
- Ferdinand Fränzl
- Pierre Noel Gervais
- Friedrich Wilhelm Pixis [pupils]

=== André von Frasunkiewicz ===
this teacher's teachers
André von Frasunkiewicz studied with teachers including Ney Salgado, Ruth Slenczynska, Valeri Grokhovski, and Viatcheslav Gabrielov.
- Roberto Banks
- Rafael de Abreu Ribeiro

=== Vito Frazzi ===
- Bruno Bartolozzi
- Bruno Bettinelli
- Valentino Bucchi
- Luigi Dallapiccola [pupils]
- Angelo Francesco Lavagnino

=== Girolamo Frescobaldi ===
this teacher's teachers
Frescobaldi (1583–1643) studied with teachers including Luzzasco Luzzaschi.
- Johann Jakob Froberger
- Johann Caspar Kerll [pupils]
- Michelangelo Rossi

=== Peter Racine Fricker ===
this teacher's teachers
Fricker (1920–1990) studied with teachers including Ernest Bullock, R. O. Morris, and Mátyás Seiber.
- Charles Roland Berry
- John Carbon
- Ann Carr-Boyd
- Justin Connolly
- Edward Cowie
- Robert Cuckson
- Adrian Jack
- Annea Lockwood
- Graham Newcater
- Michael Parsons
- Elis Pehkonen
- Raymond Premru
- Kevin Raftery
- Marisa Rezende
- R. Murray Schafer
- Roger Smalley

=== Alexandro Marie Antoin Fridzeri ===
- Charles Warot

=== Carl Friedberg ===
this teacher's teachers
Friedberg (1872–1955) studied with teachers including James Kwast and Clara Schumann.
- Reginald Bedford [pupils]
- William Browning
- Jane Carlson
- Malcolm Frager
- Bruce Hungerford
- Gertrude Lightstone Mittelmann
- William Masselos
- Elly Ney
- Nina Simone
- Dorsey Whittington [pupils]

Ruth Duncan McDonald

=== Arthur Friedheim ===
this teacher's teachers
Friedheim (1859–1932) studied with teachers including Franz Liszt.
- Colin McPhee [pupils]

=== Eli Friedman ===
- Herbert Brün [pupils]

=== Ignaz Friedman ===
this teacher's teachers
Friedman (1882–1948) studied with teachers including Ferruccio Busoni, Theodor Leschetizky, and Hugo Riemann.
- Karol Klein [pupils]
- Victor Schiøler [pupils]

=== Fred Frith ===
- Jorge Boehringer
- Eric Glick Rieman

=== Johannes Fritsch ===
- Hans W. Koch
- Siegfried Koepf
- Branimir Krstic
- Harald Muenz
- Josef Rebbe
- Volker Staub
- Kubilay Üner
- Caspar Johannes Walter

=== Giuseppe Frugatta ===
this teacher's teachers
Frugatta studied with teachers including Antonio Bazzini.
- Vittorio Rieti [pupils]

=== Gunnar de Frumerie ===
this teacher's teachers
de Frumerie (1908 – 1987) studied with teachers including Ernst Ellberg and Lennart Lundberg.
- Laci Boldemann

=== Herbert Fryer ===
this teacher's teachers
Fryer (1877–1957) studied with teachers including Oscar Beringer, Ferruccio Busoni, Tobias Matthay, Charles Villiers Stanford, and Franklin Taylor.
- Trevor Barnard
- John Bishop
- Arthur Bliss
- Richard Bonynge
- Alex Burnard
- Phillp Challis
- John Clegg
- Lance Dossor
- Phillip Gammon
- Colin Horsley
- Leonard Isaacs
- John Kuchmy
- Constant Lambert [pupils]
- George Malcolm
- Anthony Milner
- David Parkhouse
- Leo Quayle
- Phyllis Schuldt
- Cyril Smith
- Kendall Taylor [pupils]
- Glyn Townley

=== Albert Fuchs ===
this teacher's teachers
A. Fuchs (1858–1910) studied with teachers including Selmar Bagge, Adolf Bargheer, Samuel de Lange, Salomon Jadassohn, Oscar Paul, Carl Reinecke, Ernst Reiter, and Ernst Richter.
- Max Reger [pupils]
- Margarete Schuchmann

=== Johann Nepomuk Fuchs ===
this teacher's teachers
J. N. Fuchs (1842–1899) studied with teachers including Simon Sechter.
- Edmund Eysler
- Leo Fall
- Rubin Goldmark [pupils]
- Heinrich Schenker [pupils]
- Alexander von Zemlinsky [pupils] (at the Vienna Conservatory)

=== Joseph Fuchs ===
this teacher's teachers
J.P. Fuchs (1899–1997 studied with teachers including Franz Kneisel.
- Mari Kimura
- Takako Nishizaki

=== Robert Fuchs ===
this teacher's teachers
R. Fuchs (1847–1927) studied with teachers including Felix Otto Dessoff and Joseph Hellmesberger, Sr..
- Leo Ascher
- Blagoje Bersa
- George Enescu [pupils]
- Edmund Eysler
- Leo Fall
- Theodor Fuchs [pupils]
- Richard Heuberger [pupils]
- Camillo (Kamillo) Horn [pupils]
- Émile Jaques-Dalcroze [pupils]
- Erich Wolfgang Korngold
- Petar Krstić
- Eusebius Mandyczewski [pupils]
- Leevi Madetoja
- Gustav Mahler [pupils]
- Erkki Melartin
- Alexander Raab [pupils]
- Franz Schmidt [pupils]
- Franz Schreker [pupils]
- Jean Sibelius
- Richard Stöhr [pupils]
- Robert Stolz
- Maude Valérie White
- Robert Winterberg
- Hugo Wolf
- Alexander von Zemlinsky [pupils]

=== Teodoro Fuchs ===
this teacher's teachers
Teodoro Fuchs (1908-1969) studied with teachers including Clemens Krauss.
- Rodolfo Arízaga
- Mario Davidovsky [pupils]
- César Franchisena
- Augusto Rattenbach
- Waldo de los Ríos

=== Theodor Fuchs ===
this teacher's teachers
T. Fuchs (1873–1953) studied with teachers including Julius Epstein, Robert Fuchs, Wilhelm Rauch, and Eduard Wachmann.
- Ionel Fernic

=== Leo Funtek ===
- Usko Meriläinen

=== Beat Furrer ===
this teacher's teachers
Furrer (born 1954) studied with teachers including Otmar Suitner and Roman Haubenstock-Ramati.
- Olga Bochihina
- Johanna Doderer
- Einar Einarsson
- Javier Quislant García
- Erin Gee
- Florian Geßler
- Andrés Gutiérrez
- Elisabeth Harnik
- Viktor Ilieff
- Alexander Kaiser
- Matthias Kranebitter
- Sehyung Kim
- Djordje Marković
- Simone Movio
- Juhani Vesikkala
- Yukiko Watanabe

=== Johann Joseph Fux ===
- Ignaz Holzbauer [pupils]
- Johann Joachim Quantz [pupils]
- František Tůma [pupils]
- Georg Christoph Wagenseil [pupils]
- Gregor Werner
- Jan Dismas Zelenka [pupils]
