= Félix Le Couppey =

French music teacher, pianist and composer

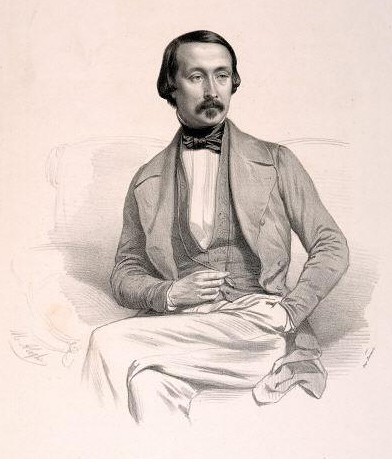
Félix Le Couppey, Lithography by Marie-Alexandre Alophe

Félix Le Couppey (14 April 1811 – 4 July 1887) was a French music teacher, pianist and composer, among others, of a series of elementary études for piano students. One of his most famous pieces was called 'Melody in C' (from 'A B C du piano').

== Life ==
Le Couppey was born in Paris. He studied at the Paris Conservatoire with Victor Dourlen. At the age of 17 he became assistant professor of harmony, receiving the first prize in pianoforte and harmony in 1825, and in pianoforte accompaniment in 1828.

In 1837, he became professor of solfège, succeeding Henri Herz and Victor Dourlen in harmony and accompaniment in 1843. From 1854 to 1886, he taught piano and wrote a larger number of textbooks for the instrument such as École du méchanisme du piano, 24 Études primaries, and Cours de piano élémentaire et progressif. Among his pupils were the singer Édouard Batiste, the composer Émile Jonas and the pianists Mathilde Bernard-Laviolette, Cécile Chaminade, and Henri Verley. See: List of music students by teacher: C to F#Félix Le Couppey. He died in Paris on 4 July 1887.

== Works ==
- Cours de piano
  - A B C du piano
  - L'Alphabet
  - Le Progrès
  - L'Agilité
  - Le Style
  - La Difficulté
- École du méchanisme du piano
- L'Art du piano (50 études with annotations)
- De l'enseignement du piano: Conseils Aux Eleves Et Aux Jeunes Professeurs (1882)
- 15 Studies for the Pianoforte, Preface to Czerny's Velocity Studies
- The Alphabet
- Conseils aux femmes professeurs
- Troisieme etude de salon (1842)
