= Yehonatan Berick =

American musician (1968–2020)

Yehonatan Berick יהונתן בריק
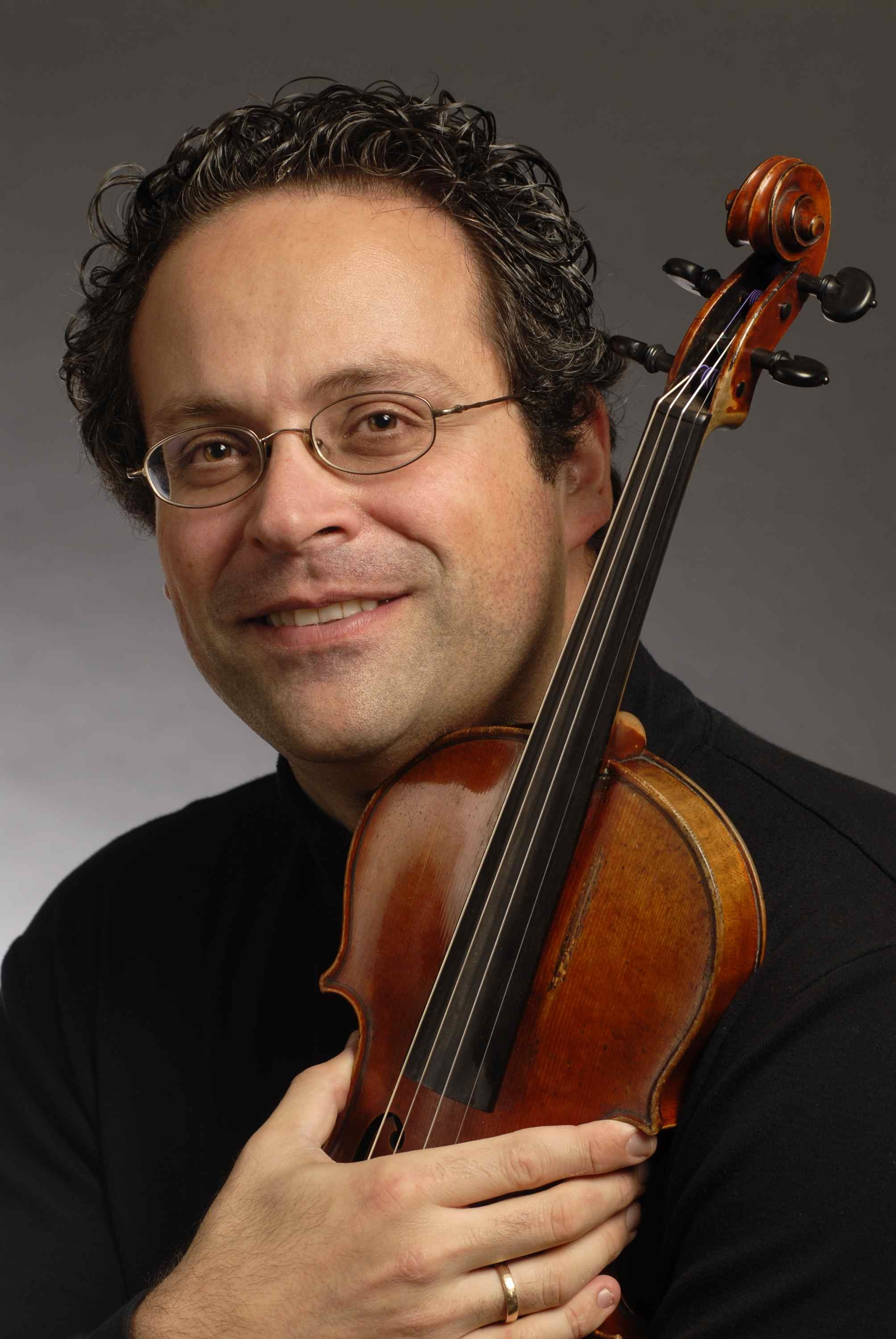

Background information
- Born: August 30, 1968; Holon, Israel
- Died: October 31, 2020 (aged 52)
- Genres: Classical
- Occupation: Violin teacher
- Instrument: Violin

Yehonatan Berick (Hebrew: יהונתן בריק; August 30, 1968 – October 31, 2020) was a violin and viola virtuoso and pedagogue.

Born in Holon, Israel, he started his musical education at the age of six. His principal violin teachers were Ilona Feher, Henry Meyer, Kurt Sassmannshaus, and Dorothy DeLay. He had theory teachings with composer Sergiu Natra, and attended masterclasses with such artists as Isaac Stern, Henryk Szeryng, Max Rostal and Josef Gingold. In 1993 he was prizewinner at the Walter W. Naumburg International Violin Competition, and in 1997 he was awarded Quebec's Prix Opus.

Berick performed as soloist, presented numerous recitals, and collaborated in chamber music performances with a long list of internationally renowned artists. He took part in the world's leading festivals, including Marlboro and Ravinia. Touring as a chamber musician, he was featured in the world's most important music centers. He recorded for the Summit, Gasparo, Acoma, JMC and Helicon labels. He was Professor of Violin at the School of Music at the University of Ottawa, and also taught at the University of Michigan at Ann Arbor, McGill University in Montreal and at the Eastman School of Music in Rochester, NY.

Yehonatan Berick died from cancer on October 31, 2020, aged 52.
