= Ronald Caltabiano =

American arts administrator and composer

Ronald Caltabiano (born December 7, 1959) is an American arts administrator and composer of contemporary classical music, with his music showing elements of modernism and romanticism.

He holds B.M., M.M., and D.M.A. degrees from the Juilliard School, where he studied composition with Elliott Carter and Vincent Persichetti. He also has studied composition with Peter Maxwell Davies and conducting with Harold Farberman and Gennady Rozhdestvensky. His music has been commissioned by the Emerson Quartet, the Chamber Music Society of Lincoln Center, the San Francisco Symphony, the Dallas Symphony Orchestra, and the Cincinnati Symphony Orchestra; additional ensembles that have performed his works include the Arditti Quartet, the BBC Symphony Orchestra, the Hong Kong Sinfonietta, and the Royal Scottish National Orchestra. A theatrical work, the chamber opera Marrying the Hangman (1999), is on a text by Margaret Atwood and was written for the Psappha New Music Ensemble.

Caltabiano has received awards from the American Academy of Arts and Letters, the John Simon Guggenheim Memorial Foundation, the Rockefeller Foundation, Broadcast Music, Inc. (BMI), and the American Society of Composers, Authors and Publishers (ASCAP).

Caltabiano worked as an assistant to Aaron Copland during the last five years of that composer's life, and has served on the faculties of the Manhattan School of Music, Peabody Institute (Peabody Conservatory) of the Johns Hopkins University, and San Francisco State University, where he also was Associate Dean of the College of Creative Arts until June 2011.

In January 2011 Ronald Caltabiano was named dean of the Jordan College of Fine Arts at Butler University (Indianapolis, Indiana).

He was Dean of the DePaul University School of Music in Chicago from July 2016 to September 2022.
