= Rita Bouboulidi =

Greek pianist (1926–2014)

Rita Bouboulidi (Greek: Ρίτα Μπουμπουλίδη) (6 July 1926 – 31 December 2014) was a Greek pianist. She became a naturalized American citizen in 1973.

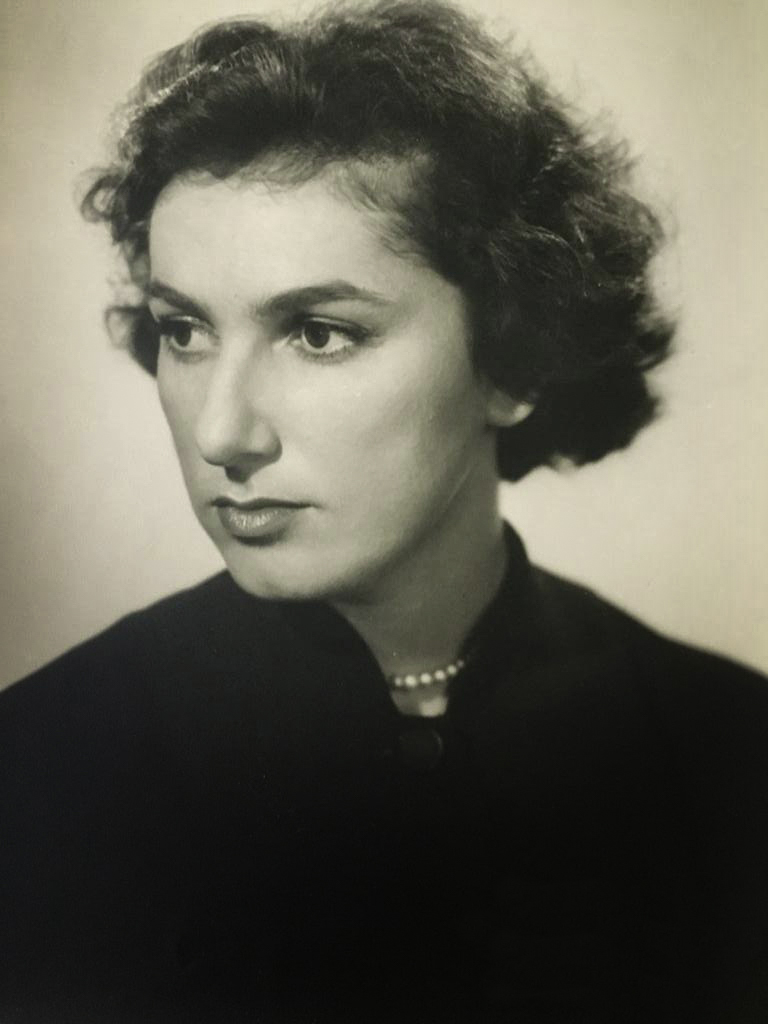
Rita Bouboulidi

== Early life and education ==
Bouboulidi was born in Volos, Greece on 6 July 1926. She started her musical studies at age 5 playing the violin but turned to the piano a year later. At age 8 her family moved to Athens. She graduated in 1944 from the Athens Conservatory of Music and the Classical Lyceum. For the two years after graduating from the Conservatory she studied privately with the composer Dimitrios Levidis and the composer and pianist Loris Margaritas. Before leaving Greece, she made her debut with the State Orchestra in Athens. In 1947 she was awarded a scholarship from the French government that allowed her to continue her studies at the Conservatoire de Paris for five years. Her teachers included Lazare Lévy, Simone Plé-Caussade, Marguerite Long and Nadia Boulanger. While a student at the Paris Conservatory she won the Première Medaille at the Geneva International Piano Competition. From 1950 to 1954 she participated in master classes and studied privately with Edwin Fischer in Switzerland. She also studied with Paolo Denza, a pupil of Ferruccio Busoni, in Italy. She remained in Paris for eighteen years. In 1970 she became an assistant professor of piano at Westminster Choir College in Princeton, New Jersey. She accepted a position as artist-in residence at the college in 1971, a position she held for four years. At that time, she and her husband moved from Paris to New York City. In the 1980’s and 90’s she was an adjunct professor of piano at the Conservatory of Music at Brooklyn College.Throughout her career she taught privately and gave master classes in connection with her performances and at various universities. In 2003 she returned to Europe living in Brussels until her death on 31 December 2014, at the age of 88.

== Career ==
During her career Bouboulidi played frequently as a soloist with orchestras in Europe and the United States. In 1953 she made her debut in France on the recommendation of Edwin Fischer and in 1965, her American debut with the Pittsburgh Symphony Orchestra. She toured extensively in recital in Eastern and Western Europe, the former Soviet Union, Cuba, Japan, North Africa, Central and South America and the United States. She appeared in European festivals and on television and radio. From the beginning of her career she often included Beethoven sonatas in her recital programs. In 1973, Bouboulidi began performing, in seven consecutive recitals, the complete cycle of the Beethoven 32 Piano Sonatas. She performed the cycle in concert more than twelve times in various cities including New York, Washington and Paris with the last performance in Athens in 2010.

== Discography ==
- Robert Schumann, Sonata No. 2 in G minor, Op. 22 and Johannes Brahms Two Rhapsodies, Op. 79, Rita Bouboulidi, piano. 25 cm 33 rpm disc EFM42024 Erato, coll. "Fiori musicali", 1957 (Record BNF No. FRBNF37873387m)
- Johannes Brahms, Concerto No. 1 in D minor for piano and orchestra. Rita Bouboulidi, piano and Orchestra of the Conservatory Concert Society, led by Luis Herrera de la Fuente. 30 cm 33 rpm disc Charlin SLC21, [undated], (Long BNF No. FRBNF378157916).
- Ludwig van Beethoven Beethoven 32 Piano Sonatas (Recorded in Brussels, Antwerp and New York, released in 2011. Recording Engineer Frederic Briant.), (EAN 8712488012407)
