= Roland Trogan =

American classical composer

Roland Trogan (August 6, 1933 – May 1, 2012) was an American composer, teacher and author.

== Biography ==
Born in Saginaw, Michigan, Trogan was a musical prodigy. He performed classical piano music as a teenager on WKNX Radio in Saginaw from 1947 to 1950, before beginning formal training in composition at the University of Michigan. There he studied with Ross Lee Finney, Luigi Dallapiccola and Leslie Bassett and received his B.Mus. in 1954, M.Mus. in 1955, and D.M.A. in 1963. His compositional work during this time was recognized by awards from BMI and the Louisville Symphony, which performed Trogan's Two Scenes for Orchestra in 1955. A Fulbright Scholarship for study in Rome was rescinded by the House Committee on Un-American Activities because Trogan had signed a petition supporting the prominent socialist, Norman Thomas. In addition to graduate fellowships in music theory and English, Trogan was engaged as Associate Conductor and Composer-in-Residence by the Saginaw Civic Symphony, under the Russian-American conductor Joseph Cherniavsky. Trogan came to Cherniavsky's attention after learning of Trogan's prize winning one-act opera, The Hat Man (1954), which was widely performed. While a graduate student Trogan produced chamber works for vocal and instrumental ensembles: the Sextet for Wind Quintet and Piano, Elegy for String Quartet and Contralto, and incidental music for Berthold Brecht's The Good Woman of Szechuan. Additional works from that time include Duos on Tone Rows, Five Pieces for Piano, and his Soliloquy for Piano, which was published in 1955 in Generation magazine as an homage to Arnold Schoenberg.

In 1960 Trogan began studies with Roger Sessions in Princeton, New Jersey and divided his musical activities between Michigan and New York. In New York he organized public concerts, lectures and seminars featuring prominent individuals and ensembles including the composers Henry Cowell and Wallingford Riegger, the Grand Prix du Disque-winning Kohon String Quartet, the violinist Max Polikoff and the violist Walter Trampler. After completing his doctoral thesis, the Concerto for Violin and Orchestra in 1963, Trogan relocated to Staten Island, New York and began his public musical career. His works were performed in New York City's major concert venues, including Lincoln Center and Carnegie Hall. Recordings of his music were widely broadcast and interviews of the composer were frequent on both TV and international radio. Premieres of his piano music were presented by Paul Jacobs and Metropolitan Opera conductor Richard Woitach, and his Sonata for Unaccompanied Violin was performed by Harold Kohon at The Town Hall. Trogan also taught for several years for at New York University, and privately for prominent individuals and families, including the families of violinist Isaac Stern, actor Richard Burton, diplomat Felix Rohatyn, actor Christopher Plummer, Sarasota Opera director Victor DeRenzi, and New York City Opera conductor Julius Rudel. His compositions of this period included The Seafarer Cantata, Five Nocturnes for Piano, and the first Piano Sonata.

He then took a hiatus from composing and turned his attention to his family and to the founding of a music school on Staten Island in 1975, which he continued to direct until his death. Although he adopted a lower public musical profile, he continued to be recognized with three grants from the American Academy of Arts and Letters. In 1997, Trogan's second compositional period began with the creation of much piano music, his Chamber Symphony, and Más ficciones (por Jorge Luis Borges) for unaccompanied violin. In 2004 he founded Patrice Editions, L.L.C., a company devoted to recording and publishing contemporary music. Trogan has written a book, The Circle and the Diamond: The Odyssey of Music, in which he proposes new procedures for the analysis of music as well as ways of understanding Western music in relation to the changing temporal perspectives in European civilization. Up until his death, he continued to compose new works. His last known work-in-progress was Missa Cavuto, a work for soprano and piano.
