= Achim Stoia =

Romanian composer

Achim Stoia (July 8, 1910 – April 2, 1973) was a Romanian composer, conductor, and music educator.

== Biography ==
Achim Stoia was born in Mohu on July 8, 1910. After completing his primary school education in his native town, he was a student at the Andrei Șaguna Teacher Training School in Sibiu from 1920 and 1927. There he received instruction in music theory, solfege and choral music from Timotei Popovic. After this he was a student at the Bucharest Conservatory from 1927 to 1931 where his teachers included Constantin Brăiloiu (music history and folklore), Alfonso Castaldi (composition, counterpoint and harmony), Dimitrie Cuclin (aesthetics and musical form), and Dumitru Georgescu Kiriac (music theory and solfege). His primary area of study was music pedagogy which he learned from George Breazul.

A grant allowed Stoia to continue his education in Paris, France. From 1934 to 1936 he studied at the Schola Cantorum de Paris where he was a pupil of Paul Le Flem (counterpoint), Charles Koechlin (polyphony), François Ruhlmann (conducting), and Edouard Scriortino (Gregorian chant). He simultaneously was a student at the École Normale de Musique de Paris (ENMP) and served as conductor of the Capella Română choir. At ENMP he was a composition pupil of Paul Dukas until his death in 1935; after which he studied under his replacement, Igor Stravinski.

Upon returning to Romania Stoia taught music in the secondary schools in Târgovişte and Sibiu before being appointed a lecturer at the Iaşi Conservatory (now George Enescu National University of Arts) in 1943. He served as rector of that conservatory in 1949-1950, and again from 1960 to 1973. From 1950 to 1960 he taught at the Iaşi Lyceum (now National College), having been removed from the conservatory by the Communist regime who sought to demote him. From 1949 to 1968 he was an officer of the Iaşi chapter of the Uniunea Compozitorilor și Muzicologilor din România; serving first as secretary and then president.

From 1950 to 1959 he was conductor of the Iași "Moldova" Philharmonic Orchestra. As a composer he wrote both symphonic and choral music.

Achim Stoia died in Iași on April 2, 1973.
