= Luis Pacheco de Céspedes =

Luis Pacheco de Céspedes (25 November 1895 – 16 February 1982) was a Peruvian composer, violinist, and conductor.

== Life and career ==
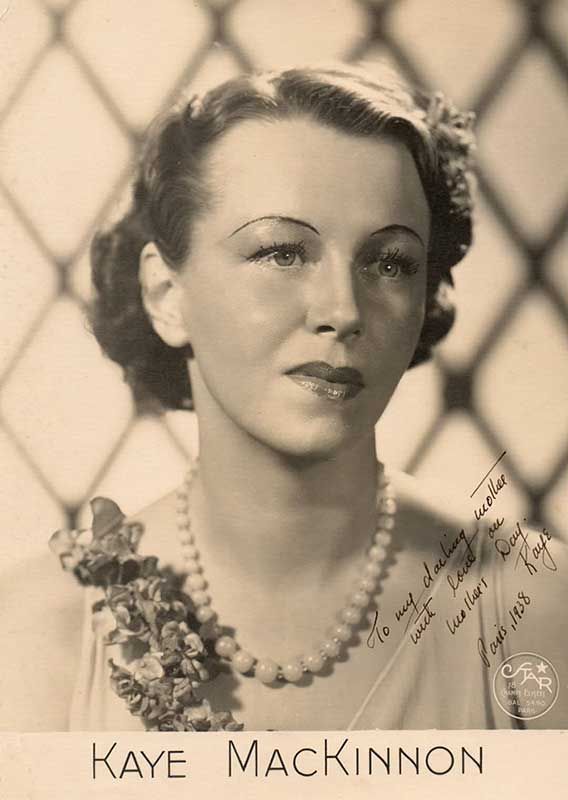
Céspedes's wife, the choreographer Kaye MacKinnon

Luis Pacheco de Céspedes was born in Lima, Peru on 25 November 1895. He was trained as a musician in his native city by violinist Claudio Rebagliati (1843–1909) and musicologist and composer Luis Villalba Muñoz (1872–1921). In 1910 he went to Paris where he was a pupil of the writer Henri Duvernois. At the Paris Conservatoire he studied violin with Jacques Thibaud, fugue with Gabriel Fauré, composition with Reynaldo Hahn, and singing with A. L. Hettich.

After graduating from the conservatory he worked for many years as an arranger for the music publishing firm of Francis Salabert; specializing in orchestration. His ballet L'horloge de porcelaine was given its premiere in Paris in 1923. His opera La masque et la rose was first staged at the Rouen Opera House in 1925. He also composed music for films made by Paramount Pictures and worked as a conductor for Paramount. He was also active as a composer and conductor for radio. In 1935 he founded the Guelma Academy. He was also active as a conductor in theaters in Monte Carlo and Cannes.

With the onset of World War II, Céspedes left France for Peru where his compositional style transitioned into incorporating Peruvian folk music into his compositions. His wife, the American choreographer and dancer Kaye MacKinnon, was a collaborator, often designing dances to accompany his music. In 1941 he was appointed musical director of Radio Nacional del Perú, and was also active as a guest conductor of operas at the Gran Teatro Nacional del Perú. In 1946 he was the recipient of the government of Peru's Duncker Lavalle National Prize for his string quartet Siclla. His compositional output included two symphonies. three sonatas for violin and piano, the opera La Conquista, the symphonic poem Navidad en la Trinchera, and numerous compositions for ballet and film.

== Death ==
Céspedes died in Lima on 16 February 1982 at the age of 86.
