= Henriette van den Boorn-Coclet =

Belgian composer

Henriette van den Boorn-Coclet (15 January 1866 – 6 March 1945) was a Belgian composer. She was born in Liege, Belgium and studied at the Liège Conservatory with Jean-Théodore Radoux and Sylvain Dupuis, where she received a first prize in solfège (1887) harmony (1882) and fugue (1884). She also won a silver medal for chamber music (piano and strings) in 1886. After completing her education, she took a position teaching harmony at the Conservatory (1892–1931). She won the Prix de Rome in 1895. She died in Liege.

Her compositions make use of a late 19th-century neo-romantic style.

== Works ==
Boorn-Coclet composed for orchestra, chamber ensemble, songs and piano. Selected works include:

- Sonata for violin, 1907
- Symphonie in F, 1904
- Callirhoe, 1895
- Mélodies
- Chöre
- Motets
- Tarentelle: Klavier
- Sonate: Violine-Klavier, 1907
- Serenade: Violoncello-Klavier
- Sinfonie, 1904
- Symphonie Wallone, 1923
- Andante Symphonique, 1894
- Renouveau: poème symphonique, 1913
- Vers l’Infini: Violoncello-Orchester
