= Fernande Decruck =

French composer (1896–1954)

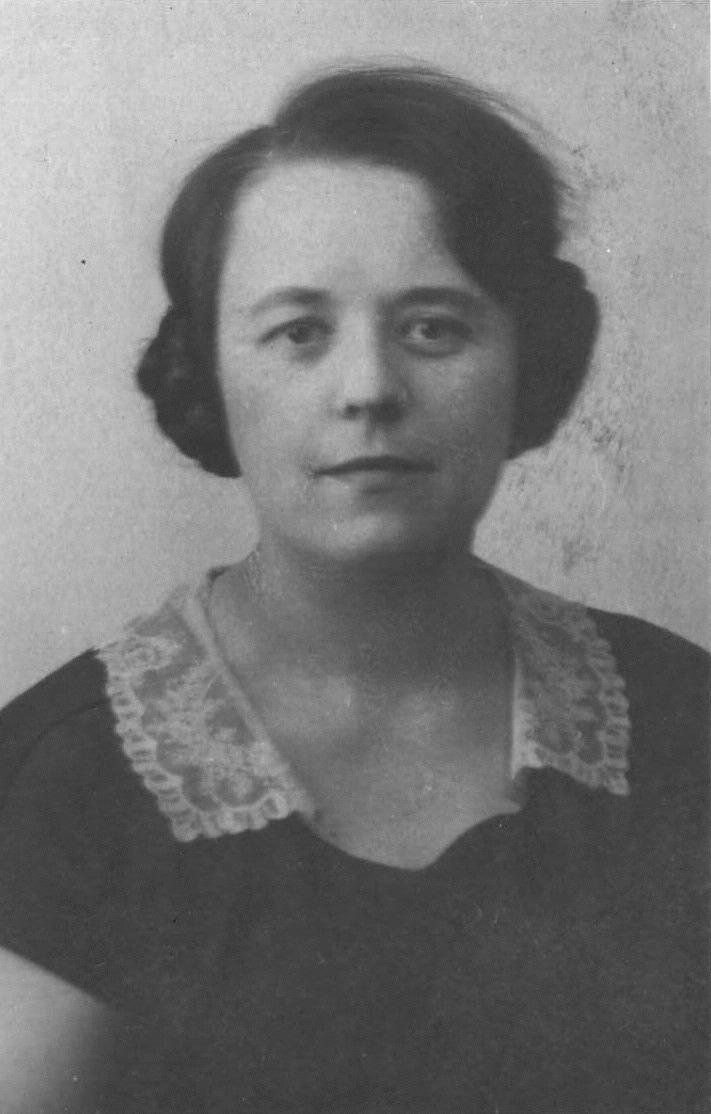
- Born: 25 December 1896; Galliac, France
- Died: 6 August 1954 (aged 57)
- Occupations: Composer, Performer

Fernande Decruck (née Breilh) (25 December 1896 – 6 August 1954) was a French composer who composed over 40 works for the saxophone. Most well-known is her Sonata in C sharp minor for alto saxophone or viola, dedicated to Marcel Mule.

== Life ==
Fernande Breilh was born in the village of Gaillac in France to a local merchant. She began learning piano aged eight and studied at the Conservatoire de Toulouse. She was admitted to the Conservatoire de Paris in 1918 studying organ and composition. There she won prizes in harmony, fugue, counterpoint, and piano accompaniment.

Her studies in improvisation on organ led her to travel to America where she gave her first organ recitals in New York. Her husband, Maurice Decruck, a clarinetist, saxophonist and double-bassist, played both bass and saxophone with the New York Philharmonic. Maurice Decruck later became a music publisher, opening the company Les Editions de Paris. They married in 1924 and had three children, Jeannine Decruck (born 1925), Michel Decruck (born 1926) and Alain Decruck (born 1937). She moved to the United States with her family in 1928.

In 1932, Maurice Decruck returned to Paris and began a publishing company Les Editions de Paris that would go on to publish Fernande Decruck's compositions. She was included in the 1936 edition list of members of the American Society of Composers, Authors and Publishers and Affiliated Societies (ASCAP). Fernande Decruck later rejoined her husband in Paris in 1933. When Fernande returned to France, she began teaching harmony at the Conservatoire de Toulouse. Between 1937 and 1942 she lived in Toulouse with her children apart from her husband in Paris. During this period she continued to teach, compose and perform. In 1942 she moved back to Paris and many of her works were premiered between 1943 and 1947 including her Sonata in C♯ minor.

Fernande and Maurice Decruck were divorced in 1950 after several years of separation. She died of a stroke on 6 August 1954.

== Works ==
- Pavane pour quatuor de saxophones (1933), arrangement pour trio d'anches
- Saxophonie pour quatuor de saxophones (1934)
- Deux berceuses pour quatuor de saxophones (1935)
- Variations saxophoniques pour quatuor de saxophones (1939)
- Saxofonia di camera pour quatuor de saxophones
- Saxophonescas pour quatuor de saxophones (1943)
- Sonate en ut♯ pour saxophone alto (ou alto) et orchestre (1943)
- Pièces Françaises pour saxophone alto et piano (1943)
- Danses autour du monde pour saxophone alto et piano
- Les Trianons pour Clavecin et orchestre (1946)

=== Pavane (1933) ===
Pavane is Decruck's first known work for the saxophone quartet. It was dedicated to the Saxophone Quartet of the Garde Républicaine. Fernande Decruck set Pavane for other instrumental combinations, including reed trio.

=== Deux berceuses pour quatuor de saxophones (1935) ===
Composed in 1935 and dedicated to the Unknown Soldier and Donald Moore, Deux berceuses (two lullabies) was written for horn quartet and adapted by the composer for saxophone quartet.

Deux berceuses is in two movements:

1. Mouvement calme et souple de berceuse
2. Berceuse Héroïque

=== Sonate en ut♯ pour saxophone alto (ou alto) et orchestre (1943) ===
Full title as published by Costallat: "Sonate en ut dièze : pour saxophone alto mi-b (ou alto à corde) avec accompagnement de piano ou orchestre" (OCLC 7343662)

This Sonata is in four movements:

1. ‘Très modéré, expressif’
2. Noël
3. Fileuse
4. Nocturne et Rondel

=== Les Trianons (1946) ===
Titled in full "Les Trianons, suite concertante pour clavecin ou piano et orchestre," the composition is a neo-Baroque suite concertante for harpsichord, named after the Grand Trianon and Petit Trianon within the Domaine de Versailles. It is dedicated to Marcelle de Lacour, professor of harpsichord at the Conservatoire de Paris.
