= Roberto Brambilla =

Italian composer (born 1975)

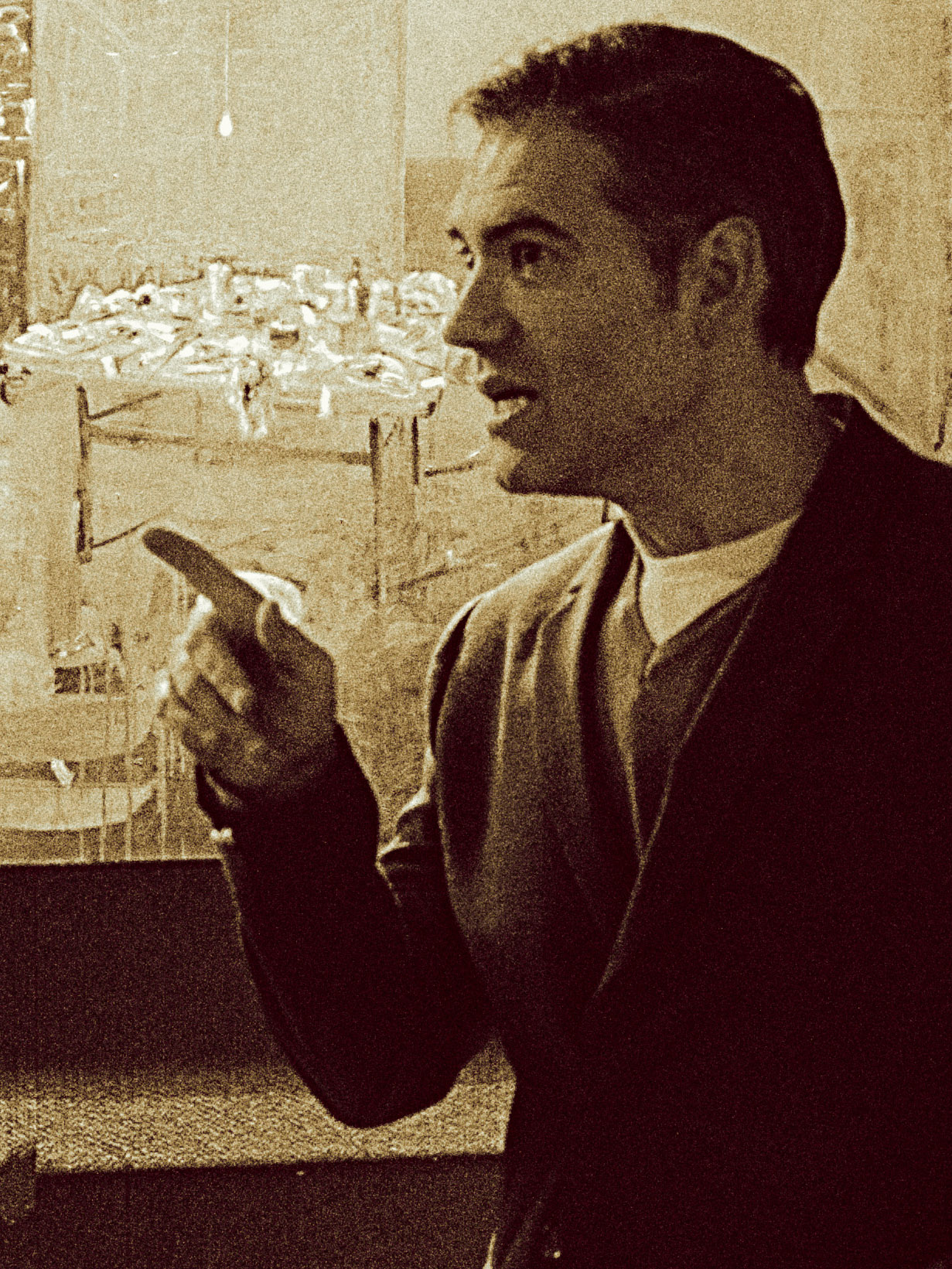

Background information
- Born: 30 October 1975 (age 50); Livorno, Italy
- Genre: Contemporary classical
- Occupation: Composer
- Labels: BAM international, TEM, Warner/Chappell
- Website: robertobrambilla.it

Roberto Brambilla (born 30 October 1975) is an Italian composer of contemporary classical music.

== Life ==
Brambilla was born in Livorno, Italy, and studied music at the "Conservatorio G. Verdi" in Milan with Alessandro Solbiati. He has improved his studies in different international masterclass given by Sir Peter Maxwell Davies, Alessandro Melchiorre, Alessandro Solbiati and Alvise Vidolin. His works has been performed at notable festivals in Italy, Austria, Belgium, Bulgaria, Canada, Denmark, Estonia, France, Germany, Greece, England, Holland, Poland, Portugal, Spain, Switzerland and USA by important performers, and are broadcast on RAI and in many other radio. He is published by BAM International, TEM and Warner/Chappell Music.

== About the music ==
The musical aesthetics of Roberto Brambilla underlines a research of sound materials, also using electronic tools, such as to highlight micro-sound in the "moment form". Examples are the glove created to modify the sounds of the piano in his piece Memoriam VII, for female voice and piano, or the use of modern instruments, used with the purpose to modify the timbre of classical instruments, in various works of his repertoire.

== Awards ==
- 2004 Mario Nascimbene award
- 2014 International PAS

== Honors ==

Cavaliere Ordine al Merito della Repubblica Italiana (2019) for artistic merits

== Works ==
Selected works include:

- Cardinal Events for B♭ clarinet (2006)
- Ipnagogico for ensemble (2006)
- Toy Box for violin (2008)
- Paesaggi contaminati for piano four hands, electronic music and the painting "Paesaggi contaminati" by Emanuele Gregolin (2017)
- Déjà entendu for piano (2013)
- Collector et Medicus for choir (2014)
- Singer's murder for percussion (2013)
- Una ripresa dal castello for flute – Bass flute and cello (2007)
- Haurietis Aquas for organ (2018)
- Brise Marine for dramatic soprano and piano (2016)
- Pater Noster for soprano, alto, tenor and bass (2014)
- L'impronta di una foglia for piano four hands (2016)
- Sul profilo delle onde for a percussionist (2013)
- Clouds don't care if we fly higher for ensemble (2014)
- Memoriam VII for female voice and piano (2010)
- Memoriam for large orchestra (2012)
- Dita nël lago for violin and electric guitar (2014)
- No Black No Fashion for piano (2017)
- Eèa for B♭ clarinet – Bass clarinet and piano (2015)

== Discography ==
Selected recordings include:

- Memoriam on Nuova contemporanea
- Il carillon di Anjezë on BAM international
- Farewell to Airon on BAM international
- No Black No Fashion on BAM international
