= Jan Drozdowski =

Polish pianist

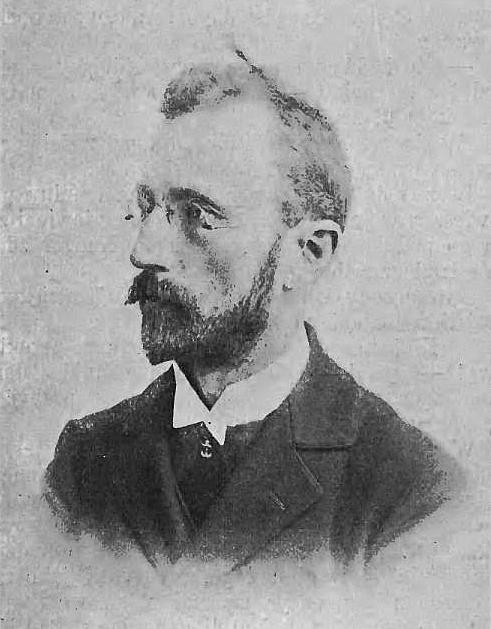
- Jan Drozdowski (before 1895)

Background information
- Born: 2 February 1857; Kraków
- Died: 21 January 1918 (aged 60)
- Occupation: pianist

Jan Drozdowski (1857–1918) was a Polish pianist and music teacher.

Drozdowski was born 2 February 1857 in Kraków. He was the son of Stanisław Magdzicki, who took part in the Kraków uprising and founded one of the first piano factories in Poland under the name Jan Drozdowski in Kraków. Jan received a thorough musical education. From 1876 to 1880 he studied piano with Josef Dachs and music theory with Anton Bruckner at the University of Music and Performing Arts in Vienna. After returning to Poland, he continued his studies with Aleksander Michałowski. From 1 December 1889 he led the piano class at the Academy of Music in Kraków until his death on 21 January 1918.

Adolf Chybiński was one of his students.
