= Michael Horvit =

American composer (1932–2026)

Michael Miller Horvit (June 22, 1932 – October 24, 2026) was an American composer.

== Life and career ==
Born in Brooklyn, New York, Horvit trained at Yale University and Boston University and studied with Aaron Copland, Lukas Foss and Walter Piston, as well as Quincy Porter and Gardner Read.

Horvit was a professor of music theory and composition on the faculty of the Moores School of Music at the University of Houston.

He was coauthor, with Thomas Benjamin and Robert Nelson, of Techniques and Materials of Music (2003/2008). Thomson Schirmer. 7th edition. ISBN 978-0-495-18977-0.

Horvit died on October 24, 2026, at the age of 94.

== Selected works ==
- Aleinu (Adoration)
- Concerto for Brass Quintet and Orchestra
- Concerto for Percussion
- Fantasy for Violin and Orchestra, 'Daughters of Jerusalem'
- Invocation and Exultation
- Ohiloa la'el
- The Cullen Overture

== Recordings ==
- Horvit: The Cullen Overture and other works Albany 2000
