= Franz Eck =

German violinist

Franz Eck (1776 – c. 1810) was a German violinist. His violin technique, acquired from the Mannheim school of playing in the court orchestra of Mannheim, was passed to his pupil Louis Spohr.

== Life ==
Eck was born in Mannheim, baptised on 9 February 1776. His father Georg Eck was a horn-player in the court orchestra of the Elector Palatine in Mannheim; his brother Johann Friedrich, born in 1766, was a violinist and member of the court orchestra, described by Johann Friedrich Reichardt as "having all the qualities of a really great player—large tone, perfect intonation, taste and feeling".

Franz was a pupil of his brother. He entered the court orchestra of Munich about 1789; he left the city in 1801 because of a love-affair, and travelled in 1802 through Germany, gaining a great reputation as violinist. The Duke of Brunswick was at that time looking out for a master on the violin for Louis Spohr, then 18, in whose rising talent he took a lively interest, and he invited Eck to Brunswick so that Spohr would be his pupil. They set out on a tour to Russia, Spohr getting instruction at the places where the journey was broken, but otherwise profiting chiefly by hearing his master.

In his autobiography, Spohr speaks very highly of Eck as a violin-player. He describes his style as powerful without harshness, exhibiting a great variety of subtle and tasteful nuances, irreproachable in his execution of difficult passages, and altogether possessing a great and peculiar charm in performance. On the other hand, Eck was evidently an indifferent musician, unable to enter into the compositions of the great masters, and showing great incapacity in his own attempts at composition. That he was not ashamed to pass off unpublished compositions of his brother and other composers under his own name confirms the low estimate of his general character to be gathered from Spohr's narrative.

On arriving at St Petersburg in 1803 he met with great success, and was appointed solo violinist to the Court, but becoming involved in a scandalous affair, he fell into disgrace and was transported by the police over the Russian frontier. His health broke down and he became insane. After living for some time near Nancy, France, where his brother had settled, he appears to have died in a mental hospital in Bamberg in 1809 or 1810. Eck's importance in musical history rests mainly on the fact of his having been the master of Spohr, and thus having handed over to that great artist the traditions and principles of the celebrated Mannheim school of violin-playing.
