= Wake Not the Dead =

- Short story by Ernst Raupach
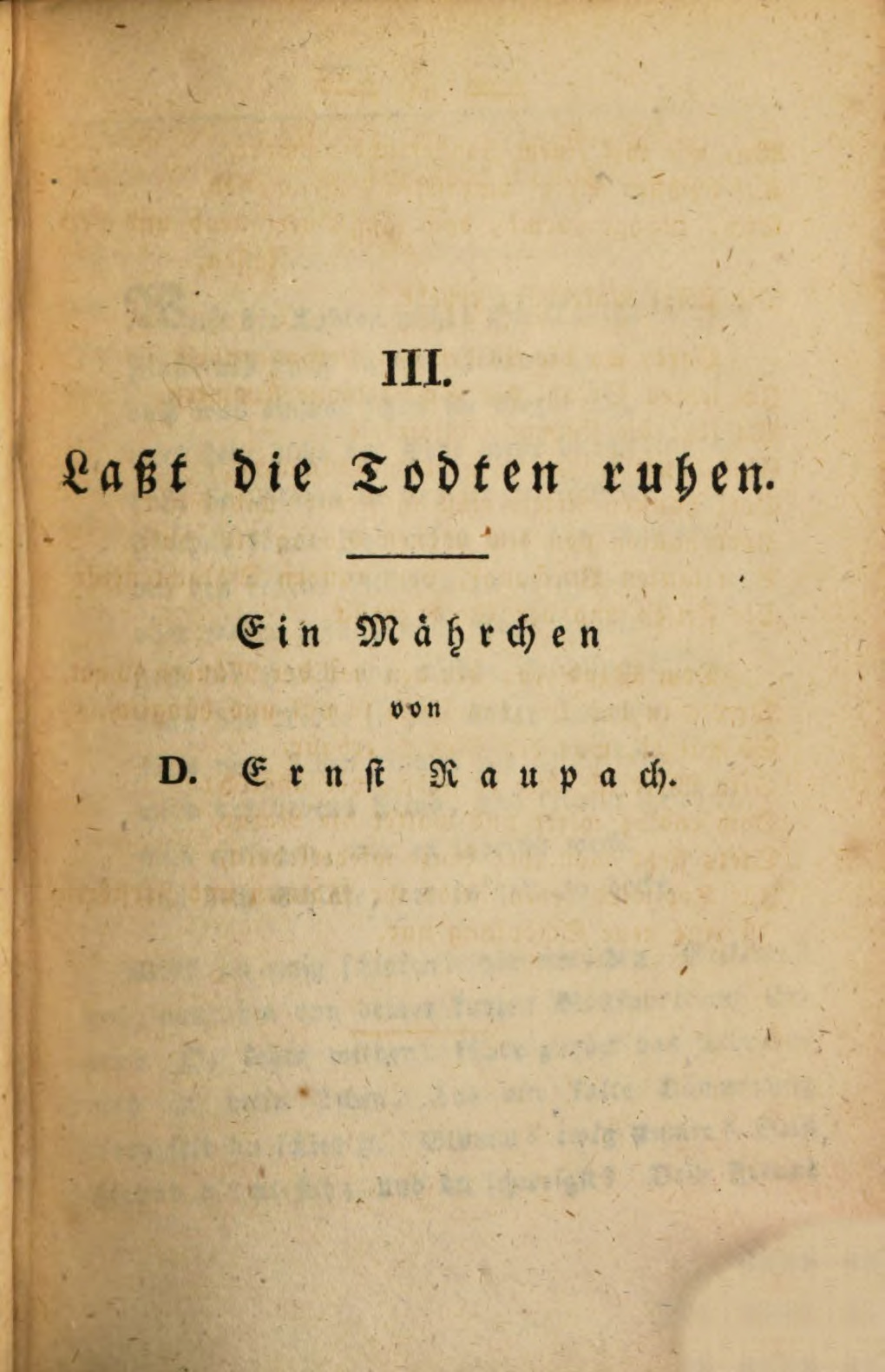
- Half title of original German first publication

Text available at Wikisource
- Original title: Laßt die Todten ruhen
- Translator: Anonymous
- Language: German
- Genre: Gothic horror

Publication
- Published in: Minerva
- Publication type: Annual
- Publisher: Gerhard Fleischer
- Publication date: 1822
- Published in English: 1823

"Wake Not the Dead" (German: Laßt die Todten ruhen, lit. 'Let the Dead Rest') is a short story by Ernst Raupach included in the annual Minerva for 1823, which was published in late 1822. It is one of the earliest vampire stories. The story was translated into English in Popular Tales and Romances of the Northern Nations (1823) without crediting Raupach, and was often misattributed to Ludwig Tieck in the English-speaking world.

== Plot ==
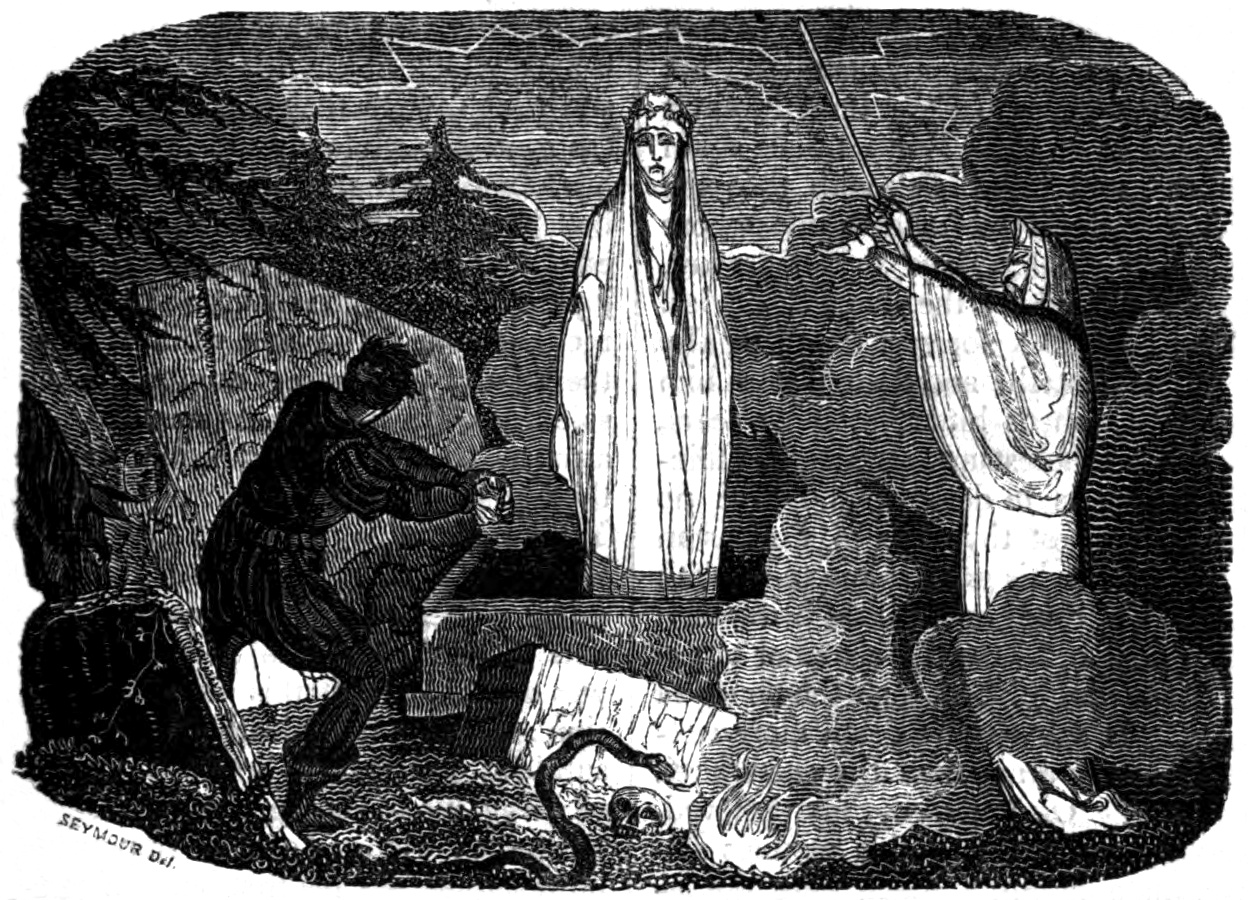
Illustration by Robert Seymour for Legends of Terror! (1826)

Walter, a powerful lord in Burgundy, mourns the death of his wife Brunhilda. He marries another woman, Swanhilda, but despite having two children with her, he remains fixated on his first wife. One night, while at Brunhilda's grave, he meets a wandering sorcerer, who says he can bring Brunhilda back to life, but warns him that it will have a terrible effect. Despite this, Walter insists, and though the sorcerer warns him over several nights "wake not the dead", he demands that the sorcerer reanimates her. The sorcerer casts a spell which restores Brunhilda to life, and departs, telling Walter how to find him if he needs his help. Walter takes Brunhilda to one of his castles, and swears the one servant there to secrecy. He returns there often, and once she recovers he longs to "press her to his bosom", but she refuses while he remains married to Swanhilda. Walter gives Swanhilda a paper of separation, which she accepts, saying that she saw him bring Brunhilda back to life, and telling him that it will prove to be his downfall, before returning to her father.

Brunhilda is then brought back, pretending to be Walter's new wife, but the servants become suspicious. A rumour starts that it is Brunhilda herself, brought back from the grave, and many start to leave. Her renewed life causes Brunhilda to thirst for the blood of the young, and many of the children in the surrounding area start to wither and die. The parents of the remaining children flee, leaving only old servants, Walter, and his two children. Brunhilda lulls his children to sleep with wonderful dreams, and feeds on them, gradually killing them. Walter is appalled, but remains under her spell; she tries at first to resist feeding on him, but soon relents. Losing his strength, Walter goes hunting and happens to find a strange plant which he starts to eat. This has properties which allow him to resist Brunhilda's power, and he remembers the sorcerer's offer of help. He hastens to the place appointed, where he finds the sorcerer waiting for him, who conducts him to a cave, and tells him that he will have to remain there until the new moon. Brunhilda finds him there, but cannot reach him due to the sorcerer's spells. When the new moon arrives, the sorcerer travels with Walter to the castle, and gives Walter a dagger, which he uses to stab through her heart, and at the same time swearing to renounce her forever, which returns her to death. The sorcerer tells Walter that if he ever thinks of Brunhilda intentionally, she will return. He thinks of Swanhilda, and travels to seek her forgiveness. She initially accepts, until she learns of their children's death.

Returning home, Walter meets a woman who strongly resembles Swanhilda, and he allows her and her group to stay with him. He puts on a lavish feast over several days, and finally proposes to marry her. She accepts, but on their wedding night she transforms into a serpent, and crushes him to death.

== Publication ==
"Wake Not the Dead" was first published as "Laßt die Todten ruhen: Ein Mährchen von D. Ernst Raupach" ('Let the Dead Rest: A Tale by D. Ernst Raupach') in the annual Minerva for 1823, which was published in late 1822.

The story was translated into English in the anthology of German stories Popular Tales and Romances of the Northern Nations (1823) as "Wake not the Dead". This book did not give the names of the authors of the stories or their translators, and though its preface mentioned a number of German authors (including Ludwig Tieck) Raupach was not among them. Though the book's translations were later attributed to a number of people – including Thomas De Quincey, William Henry Leeds, Mr J. Browning, Eliza Hodgskin, John or Robert Pearse Gillies, George Soane, John Bowring, and John Henry Bohte – it is not known which of these, if any, was the translator of "Wake Not the Dead".

This translation was included in the anthology Legends of Terror! (1826) under the title "The Bride of the Grave", again without providing any attribution to the author or translator. The anonymous editor wrote "We have seen several translations, but we think none of them are equal to the one given in the collection of 'Popular Tales and Romances of Northern Nations,' lately published by the German bookseller, Bohte, of Tavistock Street, which we take the liberty of extracting." None of the other translations mentioned have been identified, though scholar Heide Crawford concludes that this remark demonstrates the story's popularity in England.

It was reprinted in Charles M. Collins' anthology A Feast of Blood (1967) where it was incorrectly attributed to Tieck. This was followed by Peter Haining's anthology Great Tales of Terror from Europe and America (1972), this time printed under the title "The Bride of the Grave", also misattributed to Tieck. This incorrect attribution may have been a result of misreading the National Union Catalog entry for Popular Tales and Romances of the Northern Nations (1823), and persisted in the English-speaking world for many years, despite German scholars consistently attributing the work to Raupach.

== Impact ==
Raupach went on to adapt the story as a play, which was published as Laßt die Todten ruhen! (1826).

An English play adaptation by George Blink was published as The Vampire Bride; or Tenant of the Tomb: A Romantic Drama, in Two Acts (1838), which was later slightly altered for another edition that was published as The Vampire Bride; or Wake Not the Dead: A Melo-Drama in Two Acts (1854).

"Wake Not the Dead" may have been a source of inspiration for Edgar Allan Poe's "Ligeia" (1838), which deals with very similar elements of the story in a very different way. Professor Paul Lewis compares the two, and concludes that while there are no sources that confirm Poe read Raupach's story, this is not conclusive as Poe "always busy accusing others of plagiarism, was careful to conceal his own borrowings". Scholar Heide Crawford writes that Poe is likely to have borrowed, or to have been influenced by "Wake Not the Dead" from Popular Tales and Romances of the Northern Nations (1823) or Legends of Terror! (1826), both of which published the story without attribution, which may explain why Poe does not mention anyone as an inspiration for "Ligeia".

Léonor, a 1975 film by Juan Luis Buñuel, was based on "Wake Not the Dead".
