= Popular Tales and Romances of the Northern Nations =

British anthology of German short stories

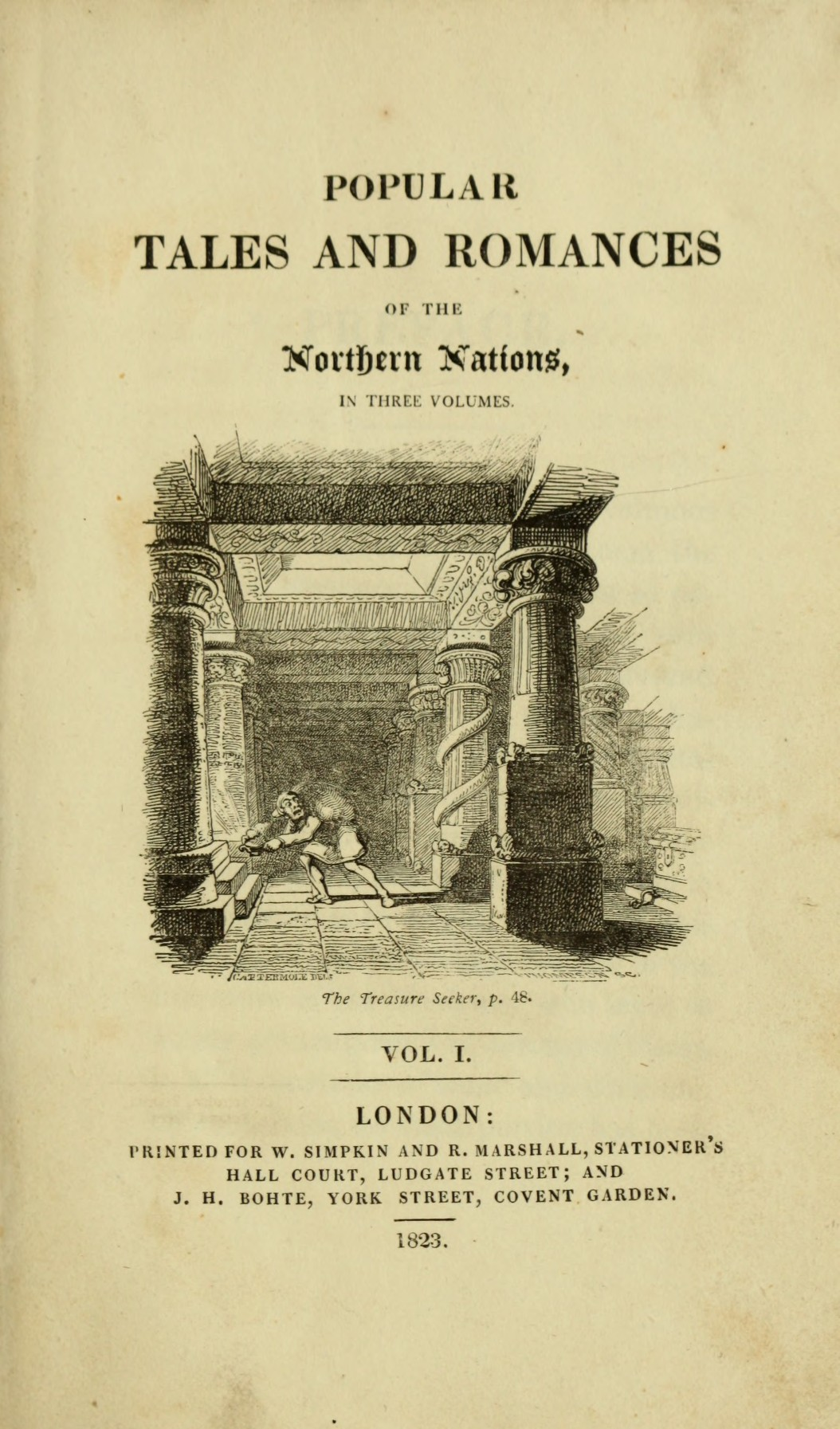
- Title page of volume 1, with illustration of "The Treasure-Seeker" by George Cattermole engraved by John Thompson
- Translators: Anonymous; attributed to Thomas De Quincey, William Henry Leeds, John Gillies, Robert Pearse Gillies, George Soane, John Bowring, Mr J. Browning, Eliza Hodgskin, John Henry Bohte
- Genres: Gothic; folk; fairytale fantasy; ghost stories; horror
- Publisher: W. Simpkin, R. Marshall, J. H. Bohte
- Publication date: 1823
- Publication place: England
- Media type: Print: 3 volumes, octavo
- Pages: 1010
- OCLC: 2867251
- LC Class: PZ1 .P819

Popular Tales and Romances of the Northern Nations is an anthology of translated German stories in three volumes, published in 1823.

== Development ==
On 8 January 1822, John Henry Bohte wrote to Walter Scott of his intention to publish Popular Tales and Romances of the Northern Nations, including previously untranslated stories by J. K. A. Musäus, Veit Weber, and others from German and Danish literature. Bohte asked Scott for his advice selecting some authors and works to be included, probably with the intention to use Scott's name on the title page and advertisements for the book. Scott in turn wrote to Daniel Terry, asking his advice, mentioning Fouqué in addition to Musäus and Weber. No replies to Bohte have survived, and no mention of Scott was added to the book or its advertisements, but Scott is known to have acquired a copy of the book.

=== Translators ===
The book does not credit the original authors of the stories, or their translators. However, several bibliographical sources attribute the work to different translators, including William Henry Leeds, (Note: William Henry Leeds is given as one of the translators in John George Cochrane's Catalogue of the Library at Abbotsford, and George Willis's Catalogue of Superior Second-Hand Books, as well as the sole translator in Sotheran's later catalogues, Henry George Bohn's Bibliographer's Manual of English Literature, and the Brooklyn Public Library catalogue, while the Peabody Institute's Baltimore Library gives "— Leed" as the anonymous editor.) John or Robert Pearse Gillies, (Note: "Gillies" is given as one of the translators in Henry George Bohn's Catalogue of Books, George Willis's Catalogue of Superior Second-Hand Books, Willis and Sotheran catalogues, early Sotheran's catalogues (the only source that gives an initial – J. – to the surname Gillies), and Sotheby, Wilkinson & Hodge's Catalogue of Books from the Library of a Gentleman.) George Soane, (Note: George Soane is given as one of the translators in Henry George Bohn's Catalogue of Books, George Willis's Catalogue of Superior Second-Hand Books, Willis and Sotheran catalogues, and early Sotheran's catalogues.) John Bowring, (Note: In 1825, several magazines reported that Friedrich Laun's novel Die Zigeunerin was being translated, with some giving the name of the translator as John Bowring, and others as John Browning. When it was ready to be published the following year, notices listed it as being "by the translator of Popular Stories of Northern Nations" or "Popular Tales of the Northern Nations". Mary Diana Dods, who had also been working on a translation of "Der Freischütz" when Popular Tales was published, wrote to William Blackwood that the translator was Browning (Eileen Curran suggests this may have been a transcription error for Bowring), whom Dods knew, and considered a good man, but a "thorough pac'd Hum-drum".) Mr. J. Browning, (Note: A Mr. J. Browning is given as one of the translators in John George Cochrane's Catalogue of the Library at Abbotsford, where he is also given a separate index entry from John Bowring. See also the above note on John Bowring for the possible confusion between Browning and Bowring.) Eliza Hodgskin, (Note: Mrs. T[homas] Hodgskin is given as one of the translators in John George Cochrane's Catalogue of the Library at Abbotsford. She was born in Germany and married Thomas Hodgskin in Edinburgh in 1819.) and possibly Bohte himself, (Note: The suggestion that the book's publisher John Henry Bohte may have translated some of the stories is given in Graham Jefcoate's An Ocean of Literature (2020).) as well as Thomas De Quincey, who is the only person confirmed to have translated one of the stories ("The Fatal Marksman"), (Note: De Quincey is given as one of the translators in John George Cochrane's Catalogue of the Library at Abbotsford, and Henry George Bohn's Catalogue of Books, George Willis's Catalogue of Superior Second-Hand Books, Willis and Sotheran catalogues, early Sotheran's catalogues, and Sotheby, Wilkinson & Hodge's Catalogue of Books from the Library of a Gentleman. De Quincey also included "The Fatal Marksman" in his 1859 collected works, confirming that at least this one story was translated by him.) though it is uncertain whether this was his only contribution.

== Stories ==
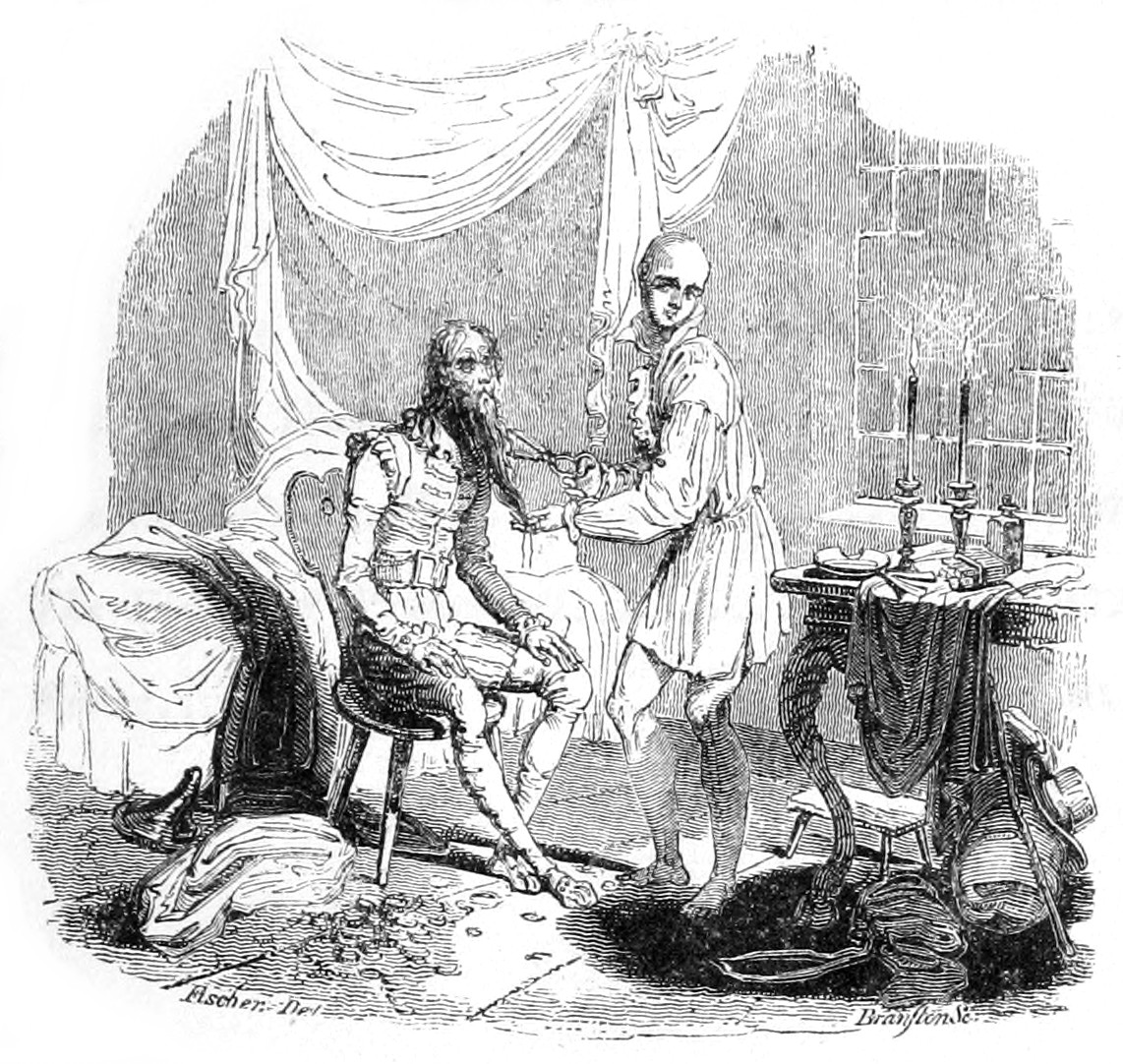
Title page illustration for volume 2, of "The Spectre Barber" by Paul Fischer engraved by Allen Robert Branston

Volume	Title	Original title	Author
1	"The Treasure-Seeker"	"Der Schazgräber"	Johann Karl August Musäus
1	"The Bottle-Imp"	"Das Galgenmännlein"	Friedrich de la Motte Fouqué
1	"The Sorcerers"	"Die Zauberer"	Ludwig von Baczko
1	"The Enchanted Castle"	"Das verwünschte Schloß"	Ludwig von Baczko
1	"Wake not the Dead"	"Laßt die Todten ruhen"	Ernst Raupach
1	"Auburn Egbert"	"Der blonde Eckbert"	Ludwig Tieck
2	"The Spectre Barber"	"Stumme Liebe"	Johann Karl August Musäus
2	"The Magic Dollar"	"Der Heckthaler"	Ludwig von Baczko
2	"The Collier's Family"	"Die Köhlerfamilie"	Friedrich de la Motte Fouqué
2	"The Victim of Priestcraft"	"Der Müller des Schwarzthal's"	Veit Weber
2	"Kibitz"	"Die Geschichte des Bauer Kibitz"	Johann Gustav Gottlieb Büsching
3	"The Field of Terror"	"Das Schauerfeld"	Friedrich de la Motte Fouqué
3	"Elfin-Land"	"Die Elfen"	Ludwig Tieck
3	"The Tale"	"Mährchen"	Johann Wolfgang von Goethe
3	"The Fatal Marksman"	"Der Freischütz"	Johann August Apel
3	"The Hoard of the Nibelungen"	"Die zwölf Ritter von Bern, oder Das Mährchen vom Hort der Nibelungen"	Benedikte Naubert
3	"The Erl-King's Daughter"	"Erlkönigs Tochter"	Benedikte Naubert

== Publication ==
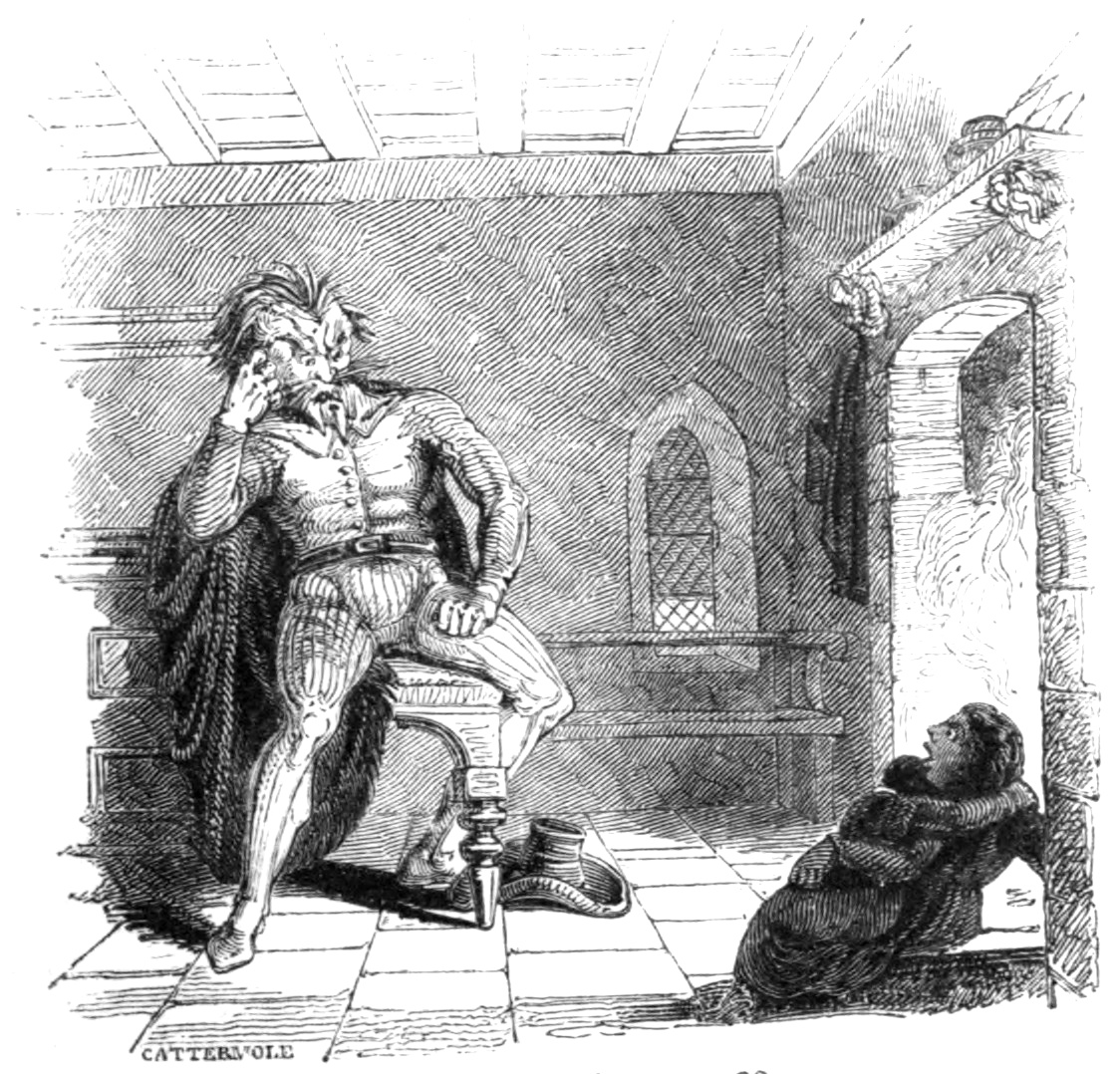
Title page illustration for volume 3, of "The Field of Terror" by George Cattermole

The book was announced as being prepared for publication in January and February 1823. All three volumes of the book were published at the same time in July 1823, by Simpkin & Marshall and John Henry Bohte in London. Contemporary adverts state it was also published by J. Anderson Jr. in Edinburgh. Several of the stories were reprinted, such as by Anderson in The Common-Place Book of Prose (1825), and Legends of Terror! (1826) with new illustrations.

== Reception ==
Contemporary reviews were mixed. The Monthly Magazine praised the title page engravings. The Eclectic Review also complimented the title page illustration for volume one, calling it "a fine specimen of both design and execution"; they claimed that they did not have the leisure to analyse the book, but that of the stories, "some of them are good of their kind", singling out "Wake not the Dead" as "an appalling and well-told tale", "The Bottle-Imp", "The Treasure-Seeker" and "The Spectre Barber" as "good specimens of old wives' stories", and stating that "The Collier's Family" "pleases us much". The Literary Chronicle and Weekly Review said the book "will afford an ample treat" to those who can "relax from the severity of graver studies, or who love to recal [sic] to memory some of the delights of their childhood", with selections from "Wake not the Dead" ("a dreadful tale of vampyrism") and "Kibitz" ("of a light and amusing character").The Repository of Modern Literature reprinting abridged versions of two of the stories called "The Treasure-Seeker" "one of the best in this amusing collection", and "The Bottle-Imp" "one of the most funny, and, at the same time, most horrible stories in the whole collection". The Common-Place Book of Prose described "The Field of Terror" as an "interesting tale" and "a most amusing work". The Gentleman's Magazine wrote that "from the lively interest which they convey" they "will doubtless long maintain a deserved popularity". In the United States, The Port Folio mentions the book as one of three published around that time that were part of "a great rage at the present in the English reading public for German tales of 'Ghosts and Goblins.'" Less favourably, John Gibson Lockhart reviewed the book for Blackwood's Magazine, calling it disappointing and saying that it "will do a great deal more harm than good to the popularity of German literature here"; he criticised the selection of stories, "The Sorcerers" and "The Victim of Priestcraft" are given as examples of the "perfect trash" chosen, with most translations said to be "miserable, bald, and even grammarless English" probably caused by "utter laziness and haste", while "The Fatal Marksman", "The Collier's Family", "The Bottle-Imp", and "The Spectre Barber" are said to be among the "few good stories" which are "comparatively speaking, done as they deserved to be". In Germany, Allgemeines Repertorium described the translations as bad, while the Morgenblatt für gebildete Stände expressed disappointment in the poor translations, and the selection of stories chosen. Describing the book in the early twentieth century, Professor Francis Edward Sandbach wrote that it was "of the ghostly romantic type so much in vogue" in the early nineteenth century, with stories "written in a style suggestive of winter evenings and bated breath".

Volume 1's "The Bottle-Imp" was said by literary scholar Joseph Warren Beach to have been a source of inspiration for Robert Louis Stevenson's short story "The Bottle Imp" (1891). Edwin Zeydel writes that the editor of Popular Tales and Romances altered the ending of the tale "to suit himself".

Literary scholar Jan M. Ziolkowski described "Kibitz" as an "adaptation" of Büsching's "Die Geschichte des Bauer Kibitz" rather than a translation, and modified it when reprinting it in Fairy Tales from Before Fairy Tales (2007).

The book contained the first translation into English for most of these stories, except "The Spectre Barber" and "Kibitz". "The Hoard of the Nibelungen" was the first narrative version of the Nibelungenlied in English. It also contains the first translations into English of any of Ludwig Tieck's works, though the lack of author attribution for any of the stories prevented it from playing an important role in introducing the author to the British public. Zeydel considered the "Auburn Egbert" translation "usually fair", but that it "fails to attain literalness, often produces a false effect and is not infrequently inaccurate", while calling "Elfin-Land" an extremely loose translation that becomes freer and more inexact as it progresses until it can almost be called a rough paraphrase, taking "inexcusable liberties" while "essential touches are omitted" in an arbitrary and unreasoned way. He suggested that a later translation of "Die Elfen" by Julius Hare and James Anthony Froude may have been based on this translation.
