= Peter K. Moran =

Irish composer

- Born: 30 June 1767; Dublin, Ireland
- Died: 10 February 1831 (aged 63); New York City, New York, United States
- Occupations: pianist, composer, music publisher

Peter K. Moran (30 June 1767 – 10 February 1831) was an Irish pianist, composer, and music publisher – probably the earliest classical composer from Ireland to emigrate to the United States.

== Life ==
Moran was probably born in Dublin and studied with Philip Dwyer (died 1802) and Philip Cogan (1750–1833). He appeared at concerts in Dublin between March 1799 and June 1816. His earliest compositions were published in Dublin from c. 1796 and reprinted there until the late 1820s.

In 1817, Moran emigrated to the USA with his wife, a singer. While Kinkeldey described him as a "Boston musician", the Moran couple was evidently very active in New York's concert life, even their daughter making her début as a singer and pianist in 1820, aged five. Moran was organist at Grace Episcopal Church (c. 1823–7), and St John's Chapel (1828–31), performed for the Handel and Haydn Society in 1820 and for the New York Choral Society's first concert in 1824. He also played the cello in the García Opera Company in New York in 1825, performed with the Philharmonic Society, and was concertmaster of the Musical Fund Society.

From 1822 to 1823 he ran a piano and music store and published about 25 pieces, including 16 of his own compositions and arrangements. Some of his Dublin-published music was reissued in New York, where he was second only to James Hewitt as the city's most prolific composer of piano music.

Moran died in New York City.

== Music ==
Moran evidently was an able pianist, judging from the scores of his piano music. He made a name for himself with rondos and variations on original or popular tunes. Several of his works were expressly written "for harp or piano-forte", suggesting that he played the harp as well. After his emigration he also became popular as a song composer, with The Carrier Pigeon (1822; also arranged as a rondo for piano, c. 1825) that had many editions. Other well-known pieces by him (for harp or piano) include his variations on Kinlock of Kinlock (1825), Swiss Waltz (c. 1810), Stantz Waltz (c. 1817), and Suabian Air (c. 1817). He also arranged many traditional airs, and religious works by Handel and others.

Many of Moran's works were still listed as for sale in the Board of Music Trade Catalogue in 1870.

== Selected compositions ==
Piano solo

- Cosa rara, a favorite air (Dublin: B. Cooke, c. 1796)
- Paddy O Snap, a favorite air (Dublin: S. Holden, c. 1798)
- A Grand March and Waltz (Dublin: W. Power, c. 1807) – dedicated to the Duke of Wellington
- A Medley Rondo and Swiss Waltz (c. 1808)
- The Earl of Granard's March (Dublin: S. Holden, c. 1810)
- Rosalvina, air with variations (Dublin: T. Cooke & Co., c. 1810)
- Sir John Stevenson's Ballad of 'Dearest Ellen', arranged as a rondo (Dublin: W. Power, c. 1810)
- L'Oiseau, a favorite air with variations (Dublin: W. Power, c. 1815)
- His Majesty George the Fourth's Grand March and Welcome to Ireland (Dublin: W. Power, 1816)
- Lady Perth's Fancy, arranged as a rondo (Dublin: T. Cooke, c. 1816)
- The Favorite Air of Tekeli, arranged as a rondo (Dublin: W. Power, c. 1816)
- The Kinnegad Slashers, arranged as a rondo (Dublin: W. Power, 1817)
- President Monroe's Inauguration March (New York: W. Dubois, 1818)
- The Favorite Dance in Mother Goose, arranged in a familiar stile [sic] as a rondo (Dublin: W. Power, c. 1820)
- A Medley Rondo, in which are introduced the favorite airs of 'Calder Fair', the 'Limerick Lasses' and 'Enrico' (London: Bedford Musical Repository, [n.d.])

Piano 4-hands

- Six Original German Waltzes (Dublin: W. Power, c. 1816)

"Harp or piano-forte"

- A Celebrated Air of Sir J. Stevenson's (Dublin: B. Cooke, c. 1796)
- Moran's Variations to The Suabian Air (Dublin: W. Power, c. 1810)
- P. K. Moran's Celebrated Variations to The Swiss Waltz (Dublin: W. Power, c. 1815)
- Voulez vous danser Mademoiselle, a favorite French air, arranged as a rondo for the piano forte or pedal harp, in which is introduced an air A la grotesque (Dublin: W. Power, 1818)
- P.K. Moran's Celebrated Variations to the Stantz Waltz (Dublin: W. Power, c. 1820)

Songs

- The Hawthorn, a ballad with an accompaniment for the harp (Dublin: P. Alday, between 1810 and 1817)
- Remember me, an answer to Haydn's Celebrated Canzonet of "Forget me not", the words by P. K. Moran (Dublin: W. Power, [n.d.])
- The Dear Irish Boy, an Irish melody (Dublin: Mac Lean, [n.d.])
- The Summer Wreath (W. H. Halpin jr.), a ballad, with an accompaniment for the harp or piano forte (Dublin: T. Cooke, [n.d.])
- The Carrier Pigeon (Percival) (New York: P. K. Moran, at his Piano Forte & Music Store, c. 1822)
- I'll Be a Fairy (William Roscoe) (Baltimore: John Cole, [n.d.])
- The Hebrew Mourner (Revd. J. W. Eastburn) (New York: Firth & Hall, [n.d.])
- Wha'll Be King But Charlie. A Favorite Scotch Air (Walter Scott) (New York: Dubois & Stodart, 1826)
- Mild as the Moonbeams. The Celebrated Quartet in Artaxerxes Arranged for One Voice [...] (New York: Dubois & Stodart, 1828)
- Ship A Hoy (Thomas Moore) (New York: Dubois & Stodart, 1829)
- Barney Brallaghan (no text author mentioned, arrangement of a song by Jonathan Blewitt) (New York: Bourne, c. 1830)
- Oh Say Can this Be Love (Masaniello) (New York: Firth & Hall, 1830)

== Bibliography ==
- R. J. Wolfe: Secular Music in America, 1801–1825: a Bibliography (New York, 1964)
- J. Bunker Clark (ed.): Anthology of Early American Keyboard Music, 1787–1830, part 2 (Madison, N.Y.: A-R Editions, 1977)
- J. Bunker Clark: The Dawning of American Keyboard Music (New York, 1988)
