= William Leeds =

William Leeds may refer to:

- William B. Leeds, American businessman
- William Henry Leeds, English architectural critic and journalist
- Billy Leeds, Australian rules footballer
