= Léonor =

- Original French release poster
- Directed by: Juan Luis Buñuel
- Written by: Juan Luis Buñuel; Bernardino Zapponi; Roberto Bodegas; Jean-Claude Carrière; Pierre-Jean Maintigneux; Michel Nuridzani; Clement Biddle Wood
- Based on: "Wake Not the Dead" by Ernst Raupach
- Starring: Michel Piccoli; Liv Ullmann; Ornella Muti
- Cinematography: Luciano Tovoli
- Edited by: Pablo G. del Amo
- Music by: Ennio Morricone
- Production companies: Arcadie Productions; Films 66; Goya Producciones Cinematográficas S.A. Serafín Ignacio García Trueba; Transeuropa Film; Uranus Productions France
- Distributed by: Manuel Salvador
- Release date: 1975
- Running time: 101 minutes
- Countries: Spain; France; Italy
- Language: French

Léonor (also known as Mistress of the Devil) is a 1975 French-Italian-Spanish horror film written and directed by Juan Luis Buñuel (the son of Luis Buñuel) and starring Michel Piccoli, Liv Ullmann and Ornella Muti.

== Plot ==
In medieval France, nobleman Richard loses his wife Léonor in a tragic accident. Though he later remarries and has children, he remains consumed by grief. Ten years after her death, Richard makes a pact that brings Léonor back to life. Her return, however, unleashes a series of mysterious child deaths, revealing she has come back as something inhuman. Tormented by guilt and unable to stop the horror, Richard ultimately chooses to die with her.

== Cast ==
- Michel Piccoli as Richard
- Liv Ullmann as Leonor
- Ornella Muti as Catherine
- Antonio Ferrandis as Thomas
- Ángel del Pozo as Chaplain
- George Rigaud as Catherine's Father
- José María Caffarel as The Doctor
- Carmen Maura
- Piero Vida
- José Guardiola
- Tito García

== Release ==
=== Home media ===
The film was released for the first time on DVD and Blu-ray by Scorpion Releasing on August 21, 2018.

== See also ==
- "Wake Not the Dead", the short story that the film is based on
