= Eleonora (short story) =

- Short story by Edgar Allan Poe
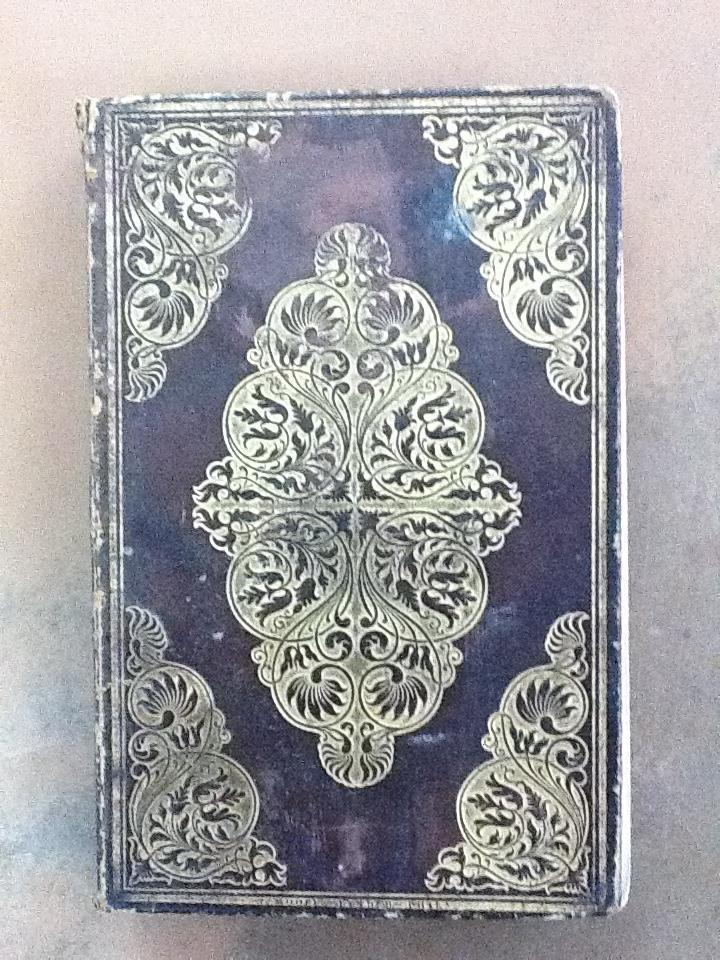
- The cover of The Gift for 1842
- Country: United States
- Language: English
- Genres: Romance; Short story

Publication
- Published in: The Gift: A Christmas and New Year's Present for 1842
- Publisher: Carey and Hart
- Publication date: 1842

"Eleonora" is a short story by American writer Edgar Allan Poe, first published in 1842 in Philadelphia in the literary annual The Gift. It is often regarded as somewhat autobiographical and has a relatively "happy" ending.

== Plot summary ==
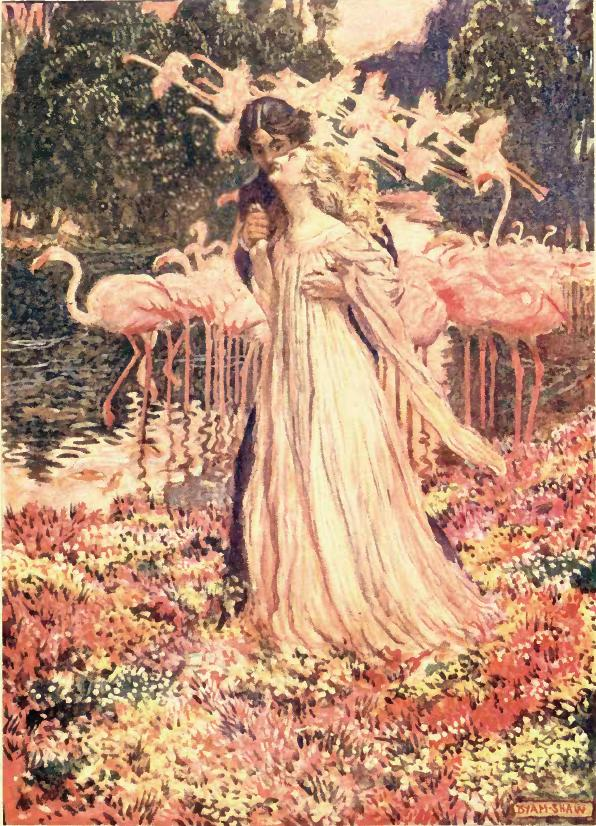
Illustration by Byam Shaw for a London edition dated 1909

The story follows an unnamed narrator who lives with his cousin and aunt in "The Valley of the Many-Colored Grass", an idyllic paradise full of fragrant flowers, fantastic trees, and a "River of Silence". It remains untrodden by the footsteps of strangers and so they live isolated but happy.

After living like this for fifteen years, "Love entered" the hearts of the narrator and his cousin Eleonora. The valley reflected the beauty of their young love:

The passion which had for centuries distinguished our race... together breathed a delirious bliss over the Valley of the Many-Colored Grass. A change fell upon all things. Strange, brilliant flowers, star-shaped, burst out upon the trees where no flowers had been known before. The tints of the green carpet deepened; and when, one by one, the white daisies shrank away, there sprang up in place of them, ten by ten of the ruby-red asphodel. And life arose in our paths; for the tall flamingo, hitherto unseen, with all gay flowing birds, flaunted his scarlet plumage before us.

Eleonora, however, was sick — "made perfect in loveliness only to die". She does not fear death, but fears that the narrator will leave the valley after her death and transfer his love to someone else. The narrator emotionally vows to her, with "the Mighty Ruler of the Universe" as his witness, to never bind himself in marriage "to any daughter of Earth".

After Eleonora's death, however, the Valley of the Many-Colored Grass begins to lose its lustre and warmth. The narrator chooses to leave to an unnamed "strange city". There, he meets a woman named Ermengarde and, without guilt, marries her. Eleonora soon visits the narrator from beyond the grave and grants her blessings to the couple. "Thou art absolved", she says, "for reasons which shall be made known to thee in Heaven."

== Publication history ==
The story was first published as "Eleonora: A Fable" in the 1842 edition of The Gift: A Christmas and New Year's Present for 1842, an annual publication. The issue of this gift book which included the story was available circa September 1, 1841. It was republished on the front page of the Boston Notion on September 4, 1841, in Robert's Semi-Monthly Magazine on September 15, in the New York based Weekly Tribune on September 18, and the daily New-York Tribune on September 20.

Poe republished the story as "Eleonora" in the May 24, 1845, issue of the Broadway Journal while serving as its editor. In 1845, Poe added the opening epigraph, a quote from Raymond Lull that translates to "Under the protection of a specific form, my soul is safe." The original publication named the narrator Pyrros.

== Analysis ==
Many biographers consider "Eleonora" an autobiographical story written for Poe to alleviate his own feelings of guilt for considering other women for love. At the time of the publication of this very short tale, his wife Virginia had just begun to show signs of illness, though she would not die for another five years. The narrator may thus be interpreted as Poe himself, living with his young cousin (soon-to-be wife) and his aunt.

Poe considered the tale "not ended so well as it might be". This might be due to the vagueness of the reason of the narrator being absolved, which is mentioned to be only revealed in Heaven. Compared to the endings of other Poe tales where the dead lover returns from beyond the grave (like "Ligeia" and "Morella"), this is a "happy" ending, free of antagonism, guilt or resentment.

The narrator readily admits madness in the beginning of the story, though he believes it has not been determined if madness is actually "the loftiest form of intelligence". This may be meant facetiously, but it also may explain the excessively paradise-like description of the valley and how it changes with their love and, later, with Eleonora's death. His admission of madness, however, excuses him from introducing such fantastic elements.

Sexual themes may also be found in the story. The narrator's name, Pyros, implies fire and passion. As he and Eleonora grow, their innocent relationship turns to love with descriptions of the changing landscape being erotic or sexual — animal life and plant life sprouting forth and multiplying. Eleonora's death might serve as a symbolic end to ideal romantic love which is soon replaced with the less passionate married love for Ermengarde. Eleonora embodies many typical traits in Poe's female character: she is young, passive, and completely devoted to her love.

The term "Valley of the Many-Colored Grass" was inspired by "Adonais" by Percy Bysshe Shelley.

=== Major themes ===
A woman returning from beyond the grave to visit her former love is a device often used by Poe. See also "Ligeia" and "Morella". Poe also often wrote about the death of beautiful women, which he considered the most poetical topic in the world.

== Critical response ==
Not long after its initial publication, an anonymous review in the Boston Notion referred to "Eleonora" as having been "written with much power, and in that gentleman's [Poe's] peculiar style". Poe's friend Thomas Holley Chivers praised "Eleonora" for being nearly a prose poem. He compared its originality and its execution to the work of Ossian. Poe biographer Arthur Hobson Quinn called it "one of his finest stories."
