= Falls of Clyde =

Falls of Clyde may refer to:

- Falls of Clyde (waterfalls), Scottish waterfalls
- Falls of Clyde (ship), British sailing ship, later an American oil tanker and museum
- The Falls of Clyde, a melodrama by George Soane (1817)
