= Ligeia =

Short story by Edgar Allan Poe

- Short story by Edgar Allan Poe
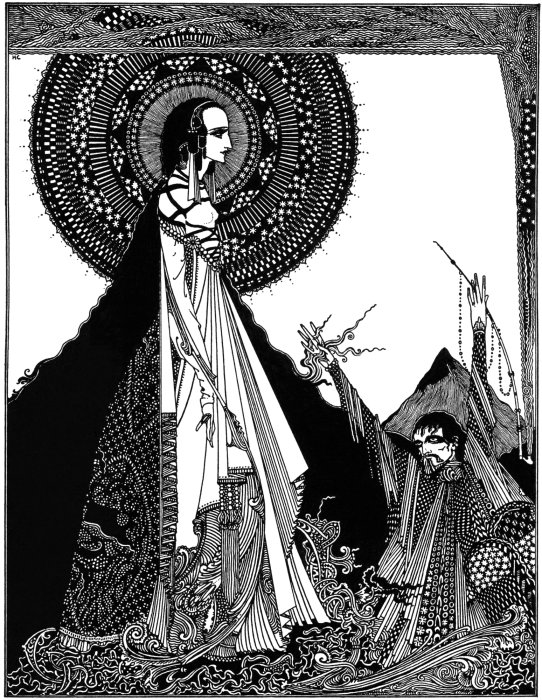
- Illustration of "Ligeia" by Harry Clarke, 1919.
- Country: United States
- Language: English
- Genre: Gothic romance

Publication
- Publisher: The American Museum
- Media type: Print (journal)
- Publication date: September 1838

"Ligeia" (/laɪˈdʒiːə/) is an early short story by American writer Edgar Allan Poe, first published in 1838. The story follows an unnamed narrator and his wife Ligeia, a beautiful and intelligent raven-haired woman. She falls ill, composes "The Conqueror Worm", and quotes lines attributed to Joseph Glanvill (which suggest that life is sustainable only through willpower) shortly before dying.

After her death, the narrator marries the Lady Rowena. Rowena becomes ill, and she dies as well. The distraught narrator stays with her body overnight and watches as Rowena slowly comes back from the dead – though she has transformed into Ligeia. The story may be the narrator's opium-induced hallucination, and there is debate whether the story was a satire. After the story's first publication in The American Museum, it was heavily revised and reprinted throughout Poe's life.

== Plot summary ==
The story is told by an unnamed narrator who describes the qualities of Ligeia: a beautiful, passionate and intellectual woman, raven-haired and dark-eyed. He thinks he remembers meeting her "in some large, old decaying city near the Rhine". He is unable to recall anything about the history of Ligeia, including her family's name, but remembers her beautiful appearance. Her beauty, however, is not conventional. He describes her as emaciated, with some "strangeness". He describes her face in detail, from her "faultless" forehead to the "divine orbs" of her eyes. They marry, and Ligeia impresses her husband with her immense knowledge of physical and mathematical science, and her proficiency in classical languages. She begins to show her husband her knowledge of metaphysical and "forbidden" wisdom.

After an unspecified length of time Ligeia becomes ill, struggles internally with human mortality, and ultimately dies. Shortly before her death she composes a poem titled "The Conqueror Worm", which depicts her mental state and the resignation of her mortal being. The narrator, grief-stricken, buys and refurbishes an abbey in England.

The narrator enters into a loveless marriage with "the fair-haired and blue-eyed Lady Rowena Trevanion, of Tremaine". In the second month of the marriage, Rowena begins to suffer from worsening anxiety and fever. One night, when she is about to faint, the narrator pours her a goblet of wine. Drugged with opium, he sees (or thinks he sees) drops of "a brilliant and ruby-colored fluid" fall into the goblet. Her condition rapidly worsens, and a few days later she dies and her body is wrapped for burial.

As the narrator keeps vigil overnight, he notices a brief return of color to Rowena's cheeks. She repeatedly shows signs of reviving, before relapsing into apparent death. As he attempts resuscitation, the revivals become progressively stronger, but the relapses more final. As dawn breaks, and the narrator is sitting emotionally exhausted from the night's struggle, the shrouded body revives once more, stands and walks into the middle of the room. When he touches the figure, its head bandages fall away to reveal masses of raven hair and dark eyes: Rowena has transformed into Ligeia.

== Publication history ==
"Ligeia" was first published in the September 18, 1838, edition of the American Museum, a magazine edited by two of Poe's friends, Dr. Nathan C. Brooks and Dr. Joseph E. Snodgrass. The magazine paid Poe $10 for "Ligeia".

The story was extensively revised throughout its publication history. It was reprinted in the first volume of Tales of the Grotesque and Arabesque (1840), the one volume of Phantasy Pieces (1842), and Tales by Edgar Allan Poe (1845), the New World (February 15, 1845), and the Broadway Journal (September 27, 1845). The poem "The Conqueror Worm" was first incorporated into the text (as a poem composed by Ligeia) in the New World.

== Critical reception ==
Charles Eames of The New World commented: "The force and boldness of the conception and the high artistic skill, with which the writer's purpose is wrought out, are equally admirable". Thomas Dunn English, writing in the October 1845 Aristidean, said that "Ligeia" was "the most extraordinary, of its kind, of his productions".

Critic and playwright George Bernard Shaw said, "The story of the Lady Ligeia is not merely one of the wonders of literature: it is unparalleled and unapproached".

== Analysis ==
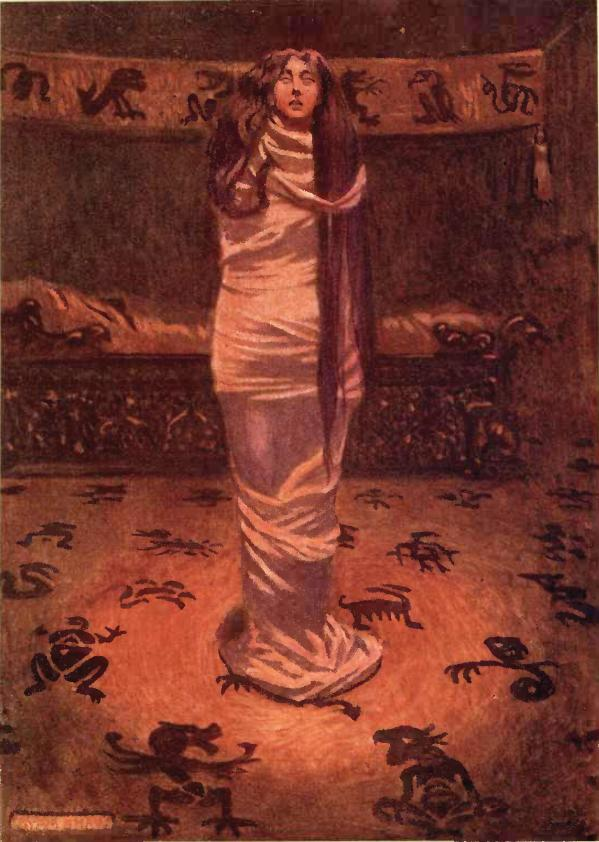
Illustration by Byam Shaw, circa 1909

The narrator relies on Ligeia as if he were a child, looking on her with "child-like confidence". On her death, he is "a child groping benighted" with "childlike perversity". Poe biographer Kenneth Silverman notes that, despite this dependency on her, the narrator has a simultaneous desire to forget her, perhaps causing him to be unable to love Rowena. This desire to forget is exemplified in his inability to recall Ligeia's last name. The story tells us however that the narrator never knew her last name at all.

Ligeia, the narrator tells us, is extremely intelligent, "such as I have never known in a woman". Most importantly, she served as the narrator's teacher in "metaphysical investigation", passing on "wisdom too divinely precious not to be forbidden!" So, her knowledge in mysticism, combined with an intense desire for life may have led to her revival. The opening epigraph, which is repeated in the body of the story, is attributed to Joseph Glanvill, though this quotation has not been found in Glanvill's extant work. Poe may have fabricated the quote and attached Glanvill's name in order to associate with Glanvill's belief in witchcraft.

Ligeia and Rowena serve as aesthetic opposites: Ligeia is raven-haired from a city by the Rhine while Rowena (believed to be named after the character in Ivanhoe) is a blonde Anglo-Saxon. This symbolic opposition implies the contrast between German and English romanticism.

Exactly what Poe was trying to depict in the metamorphosis scene has been debated, fueled in part by one of Poe's personal letters in which he denies that Ligeia was reborn in Rowena's body (a statement he later retracts). If Rowena had actually transformed into the dead Ligeia, it is only evidenced in the words of the narrator, leaving room to question its validity. The narrator has already been established as an opium addict, making him an unreliable narrator. The narrator early in the story describes Ligeia's beauty as "the radiance of an opium-dream". He also tells us that "in the excitement of my opium dreams, I would call aloud upon her name, during the silence of the night... as if... I could restore her to the pathway she had abandoned... upon the earth". This may be interpreted as evidence that Ligeia's return was nothing more than a drug-induced hallucination.

If Ligeia's return from death is literal, however, it seems to stem from her assertion that a person dies only by a weak will. This implies, then, that a strong will can keep someone alive. It is unclear, however, if it is Ligeia's will or her husband's will that brings Ligeia back from the dead. Her illness may have been consumption.

In his 1923 essay "Edgar Allan Poe", published in Studies in Classic American Literature, D. H. Lawrence draws a connection between vampirism and tuberculosis. He argues that the desire for a complete emotional and intellectual union with a lover involves an attempt to penetrate and possess their consciousness. He compares this desire to vampirism, suggesting that the pursuit of intimate knowledge transforms into an act of consuming a lover’s vitality. In his reading of "Ligeia", this consuming form of love reaches its extreme, as the narrator's desire for possession and knowledge becomes a destructive force associated with death by tuberculosis.

Professor Paul Lewis notes the close parallels between "Ligeia" and Ernst Raupach's "Wake Not the Dead" (1822), saying that the two tales deal with "almost identical material in radically different ways". Lewis concludes that while there are no sources that confirm Poe read Raupach's story, this is not conclusive as Poe "always busy accusing others of plagiarism, was careful to conceal his own borrowings". Scholar Heide Crawford writes that Poe is likely to have borrowed, or to have been influenced by "Wake Not the Dead" as translated into English in Popular Tales and Romances of the Northern Nations (1823) or Legends of Terror! (1826), both of which published the story without attribution, which may explain why Poe does not mention anyone as an inspiration for "Ligeia".

The poem within the story, "The Conqueror Worm", also leads to some questioning of Ligeia's alleged resurrection. The poem essentially shows an admission of her own inevitable mortality. The inclusion of the bitter poem may have been meant to be ironic or a parody of the convention at the time, both in literature and in life. In the mid-19th century it was common to emphasize the sacredness of death and the beauty of dying (consider Charles Dickens's Little Johnny character in Our Mutual Friend or the death of Helen Burns in Charlotte Brontë's Jane Eyre). Instead, Ligeia speaks of fear personified in the "blood-red thing". Other interpretations have been suggested however.

Poe's friend and fellow Southern writer Philip Pendleton Cooke suggested the story would have been more artistic if Rowena's possession by Ligeia had been more gradual; Poe later agreed, though he had already used a slower possession in "Morella". Poe also wrote that he should have had the Ligeia-possessed Rowena relapse to her true self so that she could be entombed as Rowena, "the bodily alterations having gradually faded away". However, in a subsequent letter he retracted this statement.

=== As satire ===
There has been some debate that Poe may have intended "Ligeia" to be a satire of Gothic fiction. The year that "Ligeia" was published, Poe published only two other prose pieces: "Siope—A Fable" and "The Psyche Zenobia", both Gothic-styled satires. Supporting evidence for this theory includes the implication that Ligeia is from Germany, a main source of Gothic fiction in the 19th century, and that the description of her hints at much but says nothing, especially in the description of her eyes. The narrator describes their "expression", which he admits is a "word of no meaning". The story also suggests Ligeia is a transcendentalist, a group of people Poe often criticized.

=== Major themes ===
- Death of a beautiful woman (see also: "Berenice", "The Fall of the House of Usher", "Morella")
- Resurrection (see also: "The Fall of the House of Usher", "Morella", "Metzengerstein")
- Substance abuse (see also: "The Black Cat", "Hop-Frog")

== Film, TV or theatrical adaptations ==
Roger Corman adapted the story into The Tomb of Ligeia in 1964. It would be the last of Corman's film adaptations of works by Edgar Allan Poe.

Ligeia's theme of the death and resurrection of a beloved woman was subsequently developed by Alfred Hitchcock in Vertigo.

In 1978, composer Georges Aperghis adapted the story into an opera under the French title Je vous dis que je suis mort.

The story was adapted into the 2008 independent feature originally known by the title Edgar Allan Poe's Ligeia but later renamed to The Tomb. The film starred Wes Bentley, Michael Madsen, and Eric Roberts.
