= Mrs Gibbs =

Mrs Gibbs, a stage-name, may refer to:

- Maria Gibbs (fl. 1783–1844), a British actress
- Margaretta Graddon (born 1804), a British popular singer

== See also ==
- Gibbs (surname)
