= Peter Moran =

Peter Moran may refer to:

- Peter Moran (bishop) (1935–2026), Scottish Roman Catholic bishop
- Peter Moran (painter) (1841–1914), British-born American painter and etcher
- Peter K. Moran (1767–1831), Irish pianist, composer, and music publisher
