= John Templeton (tenor) =

British opera singer

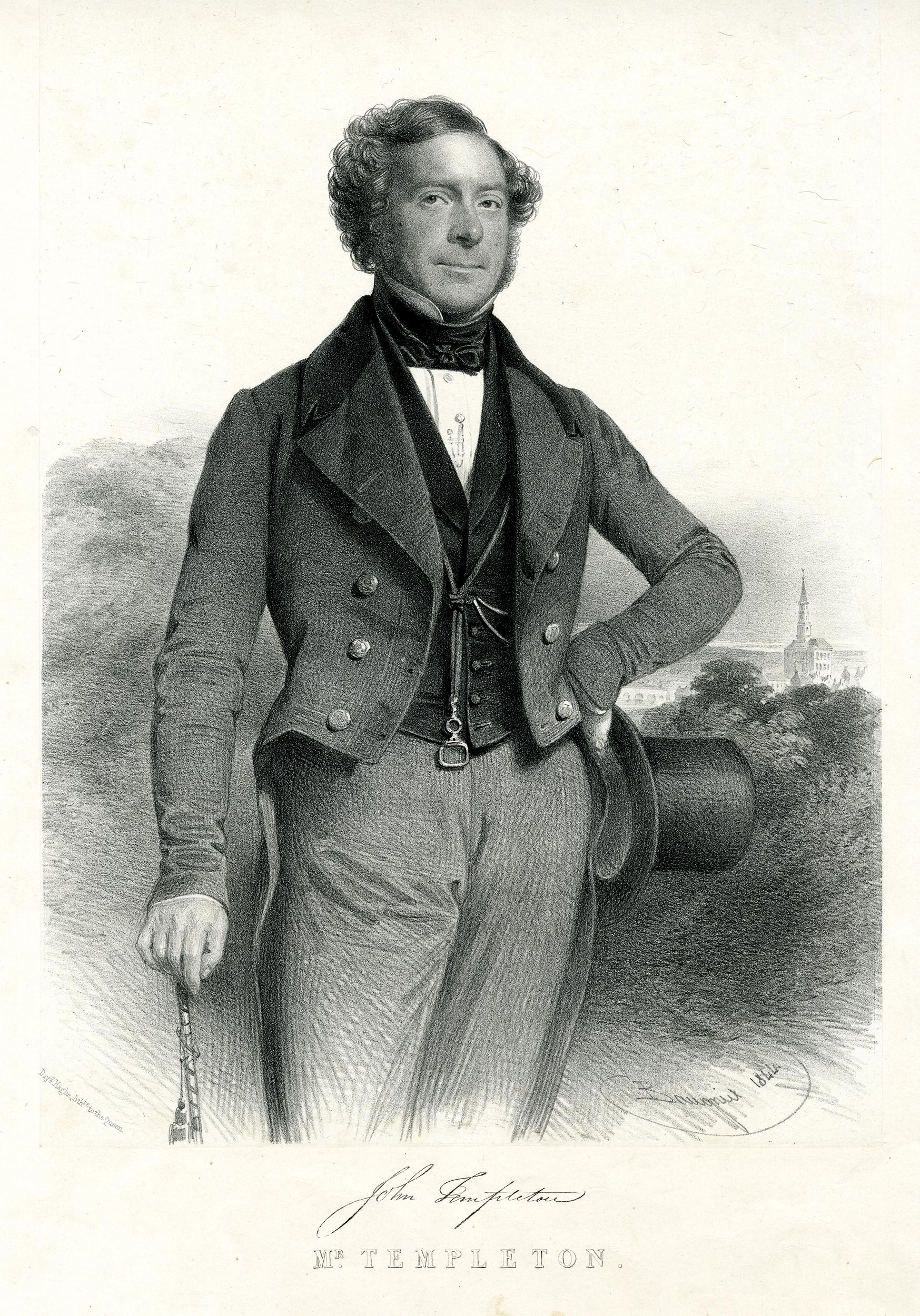
- Born: 1802; Riccarton, Ayrshire, Scotland
- Died: 2 July 1886; Hampton Hill, Middlesex, England
- Occupation: Opera singer (tenor)
- Years active: 1816–1852

Templton's residence in Hampton Hill in 2025

John Templeton (1802–1886) was a British opera singer. A tenor, he sang at the first English productions of Mozart's operas Don Giovanni and The Magic Flute.

== Early life ==
He was born at Riccarton, near Kilmarnock, the son of Robert Templeton. He was the youngest of three brothers, all of whom had musical talent. His elder brother James was a distinguished music teacher in Edinburgh, and his other brother Robert was a precentor, in the Laigh Kirk, Kilmarnock. John had a fine voice as a boy and from the age of 14 until his voice broke when he was 17, took part in concerts in Edinburgh with his brother James. In 1822 he became precentor to the Rose Street Secession church. Then, intending to become a professional singer, he went to London and studied under Jonathan Blewitt, Thomas Welsh, De Pinna, and Tom Cooke.

== Career ==
Templeton made his stage debut at Worthing in 1828, appearing as Dermot in The Poor Soldier. After some time in the provinces he made a successful London debut in October 1831 at the Theatre Royal, Drury Lane. In 1832 he appeared as Raimbaut in the first British performance of Meyerbeer's Robert le diable. In 1833 he took the role of Don Ottavio in Mozart's Don Giovanni at the Royal Opera House, Covent Garden, at five days' notice.

In 1833 Maria Malibran chose him as her tenor for Bellini's La sonnambula, at Covent Garden, and he continued as her leading tenor until her death in 1836.

He visited Paris in 1842 before embarking on provincial tours, giving lecture recitals on Scottish, English, and Irish folk-songs. In 1845–46 he went on a tour of the United States.

Templeton had a repertoire of thirty-five operas, in many of which he created the chief parts.

== Retirement and death ==
Templeton retired at the age of 50 and lived at what is now called Templeton Lodge in Parkside, Richmond, Surrey and at 114 High Street, Hampton Hill, Middlesex. Both sites are marked with blue plaques.

He died at his home in Hampton on 2 July 1886. A monument to his memory stands on Calton Hill, Edinburgh.
