= Morella (short story) =

Gothic horror short story by Edgar Allan Poe

- Short story by Edgar Allan Poe

Text available at Wikisource
- Country: United States
- Language: English
- Genres: Horror; Dark romanticism Short story

Publication
- Published in: Southern Literary Messenger
- Media type: Print (Periodical)
- Publication date: April 1835

"Morella" is a short story in the Gothic horror genre by 19th-century American author and critic Edgar Allan Poe.

== Plot ==
An unnamed narrator, deeply affected by his friend Morella, marries her despite not feeling romantic love, drawn instead by an indefinable, intense connection. Morella, a reclusive and profoundly erudite woman, immerses him in her mystical studies, particularly German metaphysical texts on identity, pantheism, and reincarnation. Over time, the narrator grows disturbed by her eerie presence, her cold touch, and her otherworldly voice, which shift his joy into horror. As Morella's health declines, marked by tuberculosis-like symptoms, he secretly wishes for her death, tormented by her unsettling gaze and cryptic demeanor.

Morella dies during childbirth, prophesying that her child will live and that the narrator, who never loved her in life, will adore her in death. The daughter, eerily identical to Morella in appearance and intellect, grows unnaturally fast, displaying her mother's mature wisdom and haunting traits. The narrator, both adoring and terrified, avoids naming her, fearing the implications of her uncanny resemblance. At her baptism, compelled by an inexplicable urge, he names her Morella, causing her to collapse, proclaiming, "I am here!" The narrator buries her in the family vault, laughing bitterly upon finding no trace of the first Morella's remains.

== Analysis ==
The narrator's decision to name his daughter Morella implies his subconscious desire for her death, just as he had for her mother. Allen Tate suggested that Morella's rebirth may be her becoming a vampire to wreak vengeance on the narrator.

Poe explores the idea of what happens to identity after death, suggesting that if identity survived death it could exist outside the human body and return to new bodies. He was influenced in part by the theories of identity by Friedrich Wilhelm Joseph Schelling, whom he mentions in the story.

There are a number of possible origins for the name "Morella". It is the name of the Venerable Mother Juliana Morell (1595–1653), who was the fourth Grace and tenth Muse in a poem by poet Lope de Vega. "Morel" is the name of black nightshade, a poisonous weed related to one from which the drug belladonna is derived. It occurs in Pressburg (now Bratislava), a reputed home of black magic where Morella is said to have received her education.

=== Major themes ===
Poe features dead or dying women in many of his tales (see also "Berenice", "Ligeia") and resurrection or communication from beyond the grave (see "Eleonora", "The Fall of the House of Usher").

== Publication history ==
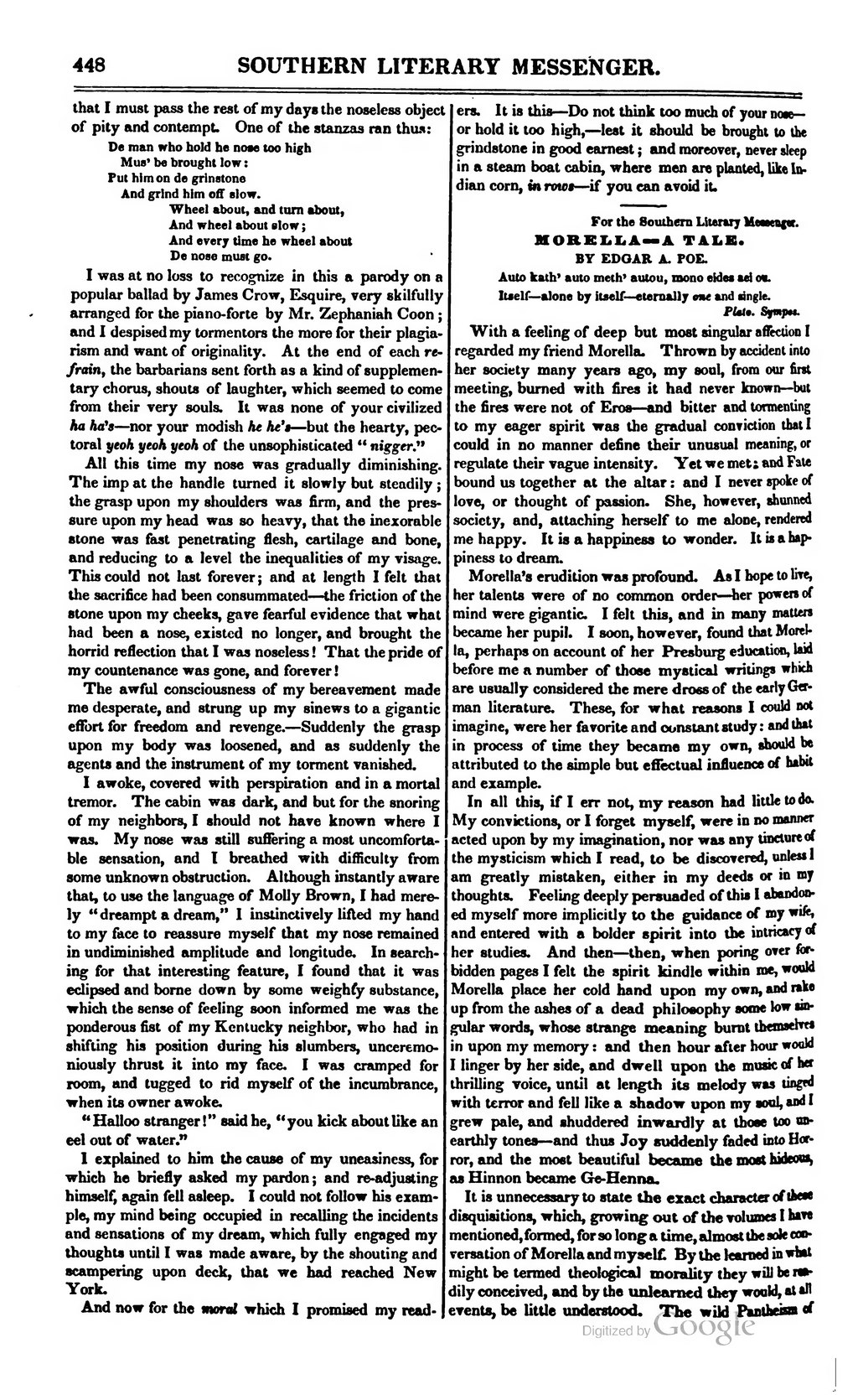
"Morella" as it first appeared in 1835

"Morella" was first published in the April 1835 issue of the Southern Literary Messenger, and a revised version was re-printed in the November 1839 issue of Burton's Gentleman's Magazine. The first publication included a 16-line poem of Poe's called "Hymn" sung by Morella, later published as a stand-alone poem, "A Catholic Hymn".

== Adaptations ==
"Morella" is the title of one segment of Roger Corman's 1962 film Tales of Terror. The film stars Vincent Price, Peter Lorre, and Basil Rathbone. The film has two other segments named after "The Black Cat" and "The Facts in the Case of M. Valdemar".

The story was loosely adapted as The Haunting of Morella (1990), directed by Jim Wynorski.

Along with many other Poe stories, "Morella" was adapted into the Netflix miniseries The Fall of the House of Usher. In this version, Morella becomes bedridden after an accident involving acid sprinklers. A former model and actress, she is married to Frederick Usher and the mother of Lenore.
