= The Hebrew (play) =

1820 play

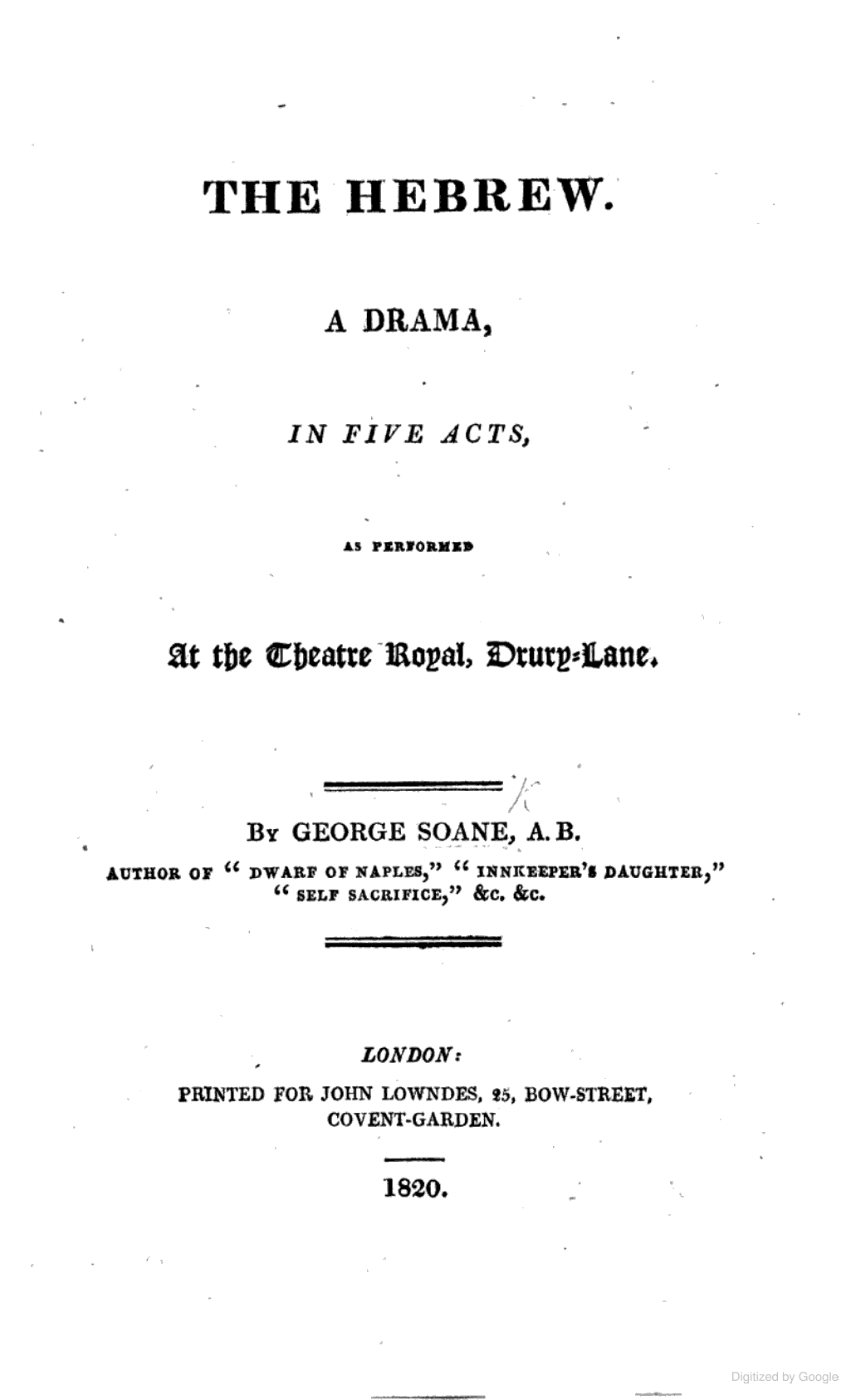
- Original language: English
- Written by: George Soane
- Genre: Historical drama
- Setting: England, 12th century

Premiere
- Date: 2 March 1820
- Place: Theatre Royal, Drury Lane, London

The Hebrew is an 1820 historical play by the British author George Soane. It was premièred at the Theatre Royal, Drury Lane in London on 2 March 1820. It is inspired by the 1819 novel Ivanhoe by Walter Scott, with a number of the characters and plot elements removed. The original cast included Edmund Kean as Isaac, Alexander Pope as Prince Aymer, Thomas S. Hamblin as Brian de Bois Guilbert, Charles Holland as Cedric, William Penley as Ivanhoe, William Oxberry as Friar Tuck, Margaret Carew as Miriam and Sarah West as Rebecca. He dedicated the published version of the play to his father the architect Sir John Soane. The rival Theatre Royal, Covent Garden put on its own version of the novel, Ivanhoe by Samuel Beazley, the same year.

== Bibliography ==
- Greene, John C. Theatre in Dublin, 1745-1820: A Calendar of Performances, Volume 6. Lexington Books, 2011.
- Nicoll, Allardyce. A History of Early Nineteenth Century Drama 1800-1850. Cambridge University Press, 1930.
- Rigney, Ann. The Afterlives of Walter Scott: Memory on the Move. OUP Oxford, 2012.
- Specter, Sheila A. Romanticism/Judaica: A Convergence of Cultures. Routledge, 2016.
