= The Innkeeper's Daughter =

1817 play

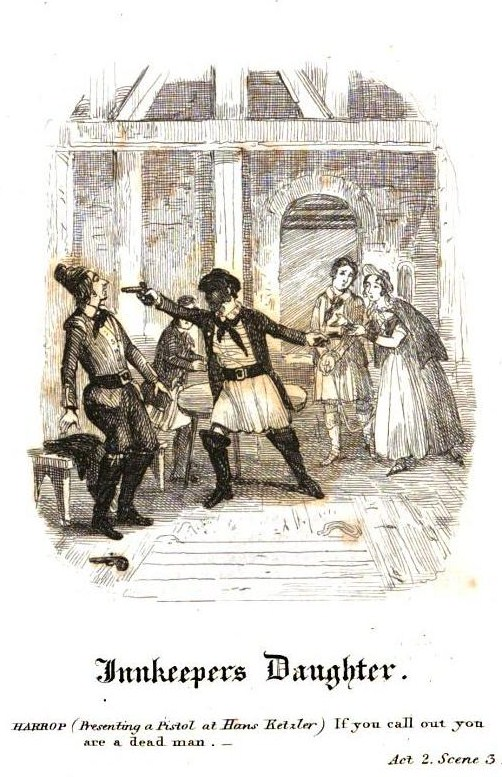
- Original language: English
- Written by: George Soane
- Genre: Melodrama

Premiere
- Date: 7 April 1817
- Place: Theatre Royal, Drury Lane, London

The Innkeeper's Daughter is an 1817 stage melodrama by the British writer George Soane. It was loosely based on the ballad Mary the Maid of the Inn by Robert Southey. It premiered at the Theatre Royal, Drury Lane in London on 7 April 1817. The original cast included Henry Gattie as Frankland, James William Wallack as Richard, Thomas Cooke as Hans Ketzler, Frances Maria Kelly as Mary and Sarah Harlowe as Marian. The music was composed by Thomas Simpson Cooke. Its Irish debut was at the Crow Street Theatre in Dublin on 19 January 1818.

== Bibliography ==
- Greene, John C. Theatre in Dublin, 1745-1820: A Calendar of Performances, Volume 6. Lexington Books, 2011.
- Nicoll, Allardyce. A History of Early Nineteenth Century Drama 1800-1850. Cambridge University Press, 1930.
- Raby, Peter. Fair Ophelia: A Life of Harriet Smithson Berlioz. Cambridge University Press, 2003.
