= Tales of Terror =

1962 film by Roger Corman

- Theatrical release poster
- Directed by: Roger Corman
- Screenplay by: Richard Matheson
- Based on: "Morella" "The Black Cat" "The Cask of Amontillado" "The Facts in the Case of M. Valdemar" by Edgar Allan Poe
- Produced by: Roger Corman
- Starring: Vincent Price; Peter Lorre; Basil Rathbone; Debra Paget
- Cinematography: Floyd Crosby
- Edited by: Anthony Carras
- Music by: Les Baxter
- Color process: Pathécolor
- Production company: Alta Vista Productions
- Distributed by: American International Pictures
- Release date: July 4, 1962
- Running time: 89 minutes
- Country: United States
- Language: English
- Box office: $1.5 million or $1 million 64,396 admissions (France)

Tales of Terror is a 1962 American International Pictures Gothic horror anthology film in colour and Panavision, produced by Samuel Z. Arkoff, James H. Nicholson, and Roger Corman, who also directed. The screenplay was written by Richard Matheson, and the film stars Vincent Price, Peter Lorre, and Basil Rathbone. It is the fourth in the so-called Corman-Poe cycle of eight films, largely featuring adaptations of Edgar Allan Poe stories and directed by Corman for AIP. The film was released in 1962 as a double feature with Panic in Year Zero!.

== Plot ==
Three short sequences, based on the following Poe tales, are told: "Morella", "The Black Cat" (which is combined with another Poe tale, "The Cask of Amontillado"), and "The Facts in the Case of M. Valdemar". Each sequence is introduced via voiceover narration by Vincent Price, who also appears in all three narratives.

=== "Morella" ===
When Lenora Locke travels from Boston to be reunited with her father in his decrepit and cobwebbed mansion, she finds him drunk, disordered, and depressed. He refuses her company, insisting that she killed her mother Morella in childbirth. Lenora then discovers her mother's body decomposing on a bed in the house.

Lenora cannot return to Boston and remains in the house to care for her father. His feelings soften towards her when he learns she has a terminal illness. One night Morella's spirit rises, and kills Lenora in revenge for her childbed death. Morella's body is then resurrected, becoming as whole and as beautiful as she was in life. This is in exchange for Lenora's body, which is now decomposing where Morella lay.

Morella strangles her horrified husband as a fire breaks out in the house. Then Morella and Lenora return to their original bodies, Lenora smiling as she lies on her dead father, the rotten Morella cackling as the flames consume the house and all three bodies of the Lockes.

=== "The Black Cat" ===
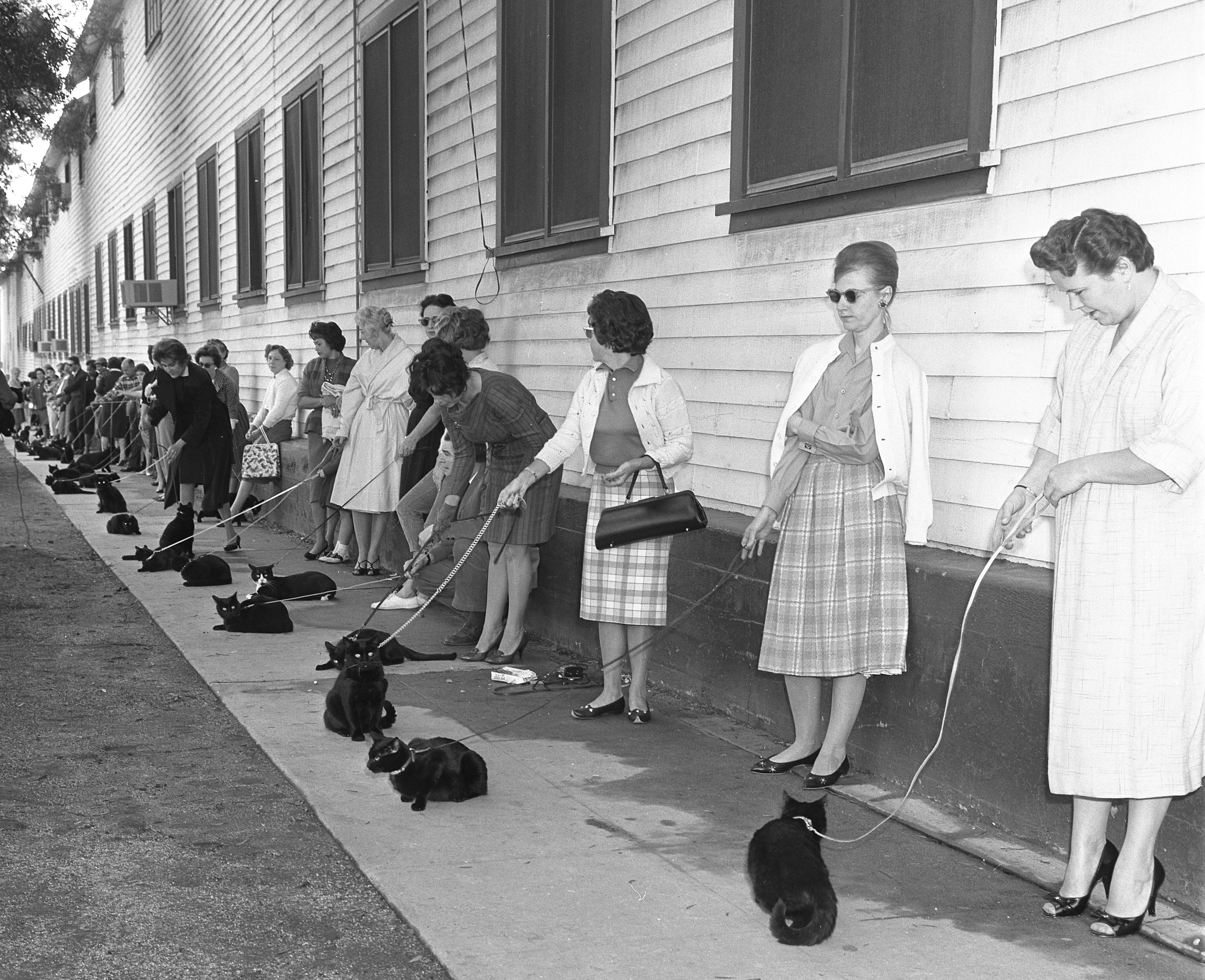
Casting call for black cats for "The Black Cat" segment in Tales of Terror, 1961

Montresor Herringbone hates his wife Annabelle and her black cat. One night on a ramble about town, he happens upon a wine tasting event and challenges the world's foremost wine taster, Fortunato Luchresi, to a contest. Herringbone successfully identifies each wine, but becomes drunk. Luchresi escorts him home and meets his wife.

Time passes, and Annabelle and Luchresi become intimate. The cuckolded Herringbone then entombs them alive in an alcove in the basement. However he cannot escape "seeing" and "hearing" both the black cat and the murdered couple taunting him. The authorities become suspicious and two policemen visit the house to investigate. Hearing screeching behind a basement wall, they knock the wall down to discover the dead lovers — and Annabelle's black cat. The sequence ends with Poe's words in red on screen: "I had walled the black monster up within the tomb!".

=== "The Facts in the Case of M. Valdemar" ===
Dying from a painful disease, M. Ernest Valdemar employs a hypnotist, Mr. Carmichael, to alleviate his suffering by putting him under various trances. He then remains between the worlds of the living and the dead. In a trance, Valdemar begs Carmichael to release his soul so he can die, but Carmichael cruelly refuses.

Months pass and Valdemar's putrefying body remains in his bed under the complete control of Carmichael. The hypnotist tries to force Valdemar's wife, Helene, to marry him. When she refuses, Carmichael attacks her. Valdemar's putrid body rises from the bed and kills Carmichael. Helene is rescued by Valdemar's physician, Dr. Elliot James, and carried from the scene of horror.

== Cast ==
Morella

- Vincent Price as Locke
- Maggie Pierce as Lenora Locke
- Leona Gage as Morella Locke
- Ed Cobb as Coach Driver

The Black Cat

- Vincent Price as Fortunato Luchresi
- Peter Lorre as Montresor Herringbone
- Joyce Jameson as Annabel Herringbone
- Lennie Weinrib as Policeman
- Wally Campo as Barman Wilkins
- John Hackett as Policeman
- Alan DeWitt as Wine Society Chairman

The Case of M. Valdemar

- Vincent Price as Ernest Valdemar
- Basil Rathbone as Mr. Carmichael
- Debra Paget as Helene Valdemar
- David Frankham as Dr. Elliot James
- Scott Brown as Servant

== Production ==
The film was announced in September 1961. It was shot on November 28.

Corman commented on how Tales of Terror differed from his earlier film adaptations released by AIP:

With Tales of Terror, we tried to do something a little different. The screenplay was actually a series of very frightening, dramatic sequences inspired by several of the Poe stories. To break things up, we tried introducing humor into one of them..."

The three stories in the film took a total of three weeks to film. For the conclusion of "Morella", Corman reused some sets and event footage from the fiery climax of House of Usher. The story Morella was remade in the 1990s as The Haunting of Morella.

Price explained how the effect of slow decomposition was achieved in "The Facts in the Case of M. Valdemar": "We settled for an old-fashioned mud pack – it dries and draws the skin up and then cracks open." To give the impression of Vincent Price's face melting away, a mixture of glue, glycerin, corn starch and make-up paint was heated and then poured over his head. The substance was so hot that Price could only stand it for a few seconds.

Richard Matheson's favorite of the stories was the final one, M. Valdemar. He thought it was "pretty well done. It was pretty straight, except I added the doctor and Valdemar's wife to the story... They acted it pretty well for a change."

== Reception ==
Howard Thompson of The New York Times called the film a "dull, absurd and trashy adaptation", and recommended that viewers only watch the accompanying picture on the double bill, Burn, Witch, Burn. Variety wrote, "Whether audiences will have been rendered limp by the Poe cycle is anybody's guess. Producer Corman, though, plays his latest entry for all it's worth and has assembled some tasty ghoulish acting talent which have marquee strength." The review named "Morella" as the best of the three stories. Margaret Harford of the Los Angeles Times wrote, "Poe admirers will almost certainly find 'Tales of Terror' no substitute for the master's original work but entertaining as another seance with spooks." Harrison's Reports graded the film as "Poor", opining that it "fails to deliver its promise of spine-tingling entertainment. In fact, it's on the dullish side of movie-making." The Monthly Film Bulletin declared, "By and large, Roger Corman's Poe adaptations maintain the highest standard in their field since Val Lewton's low-budget horror films of the Forties", and noted that the anthology format provided "the added advantage that for once there is no sense of the material being stretched too thin."

At the film review aggregator website Rotten Tomatoes, the film received a score of 71% based on reviews from 14 respondents. Time Out said the film was "elegant and funny, but the short-story format deprives Corman of the majestic, melancholic rhythm which characterizes his best work of this type."

== Merchandise ==
The film has been twice released by MGM on Region 1 DVD: As part of a Midnight Movie Double Feature (with Twice-Told Tales) on September 20, 2005, then again as part of the "Vincent Price Scream Legends Collection" on September 11, 2007.

Dell Comics published a comic book adaptation of the film.

A novelization of the film was written in 1962 by Eunice Sudak, adapted from Richard Matheson's screenplay, which was published by Lancer Books in a mass market paperback.

In 2011, La-La Land Records released on CD Les Baxter's music score from the "Morella" segment of Tales of Terror. It also features selections from his score used over the end credits for X: The Man with the X-Ray Eyes.

== See also ==
- List of American films of 1962
- List of ghost films
