= The Conqueror Worm =

Poem by Edgar Allan Poe

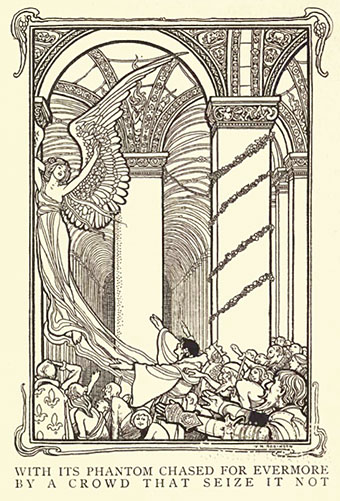
Illustration for "The Conqueror Worm", by W. Heath Robinson, 1900

"The Conqueror Worm" is a poem by Edgar Allan Poe about human mortality and the inevitability of death. It was first published separately in Graham's Magazine in 1843, but quickly became associated with Poe's short story "Ligeia" after Poe added the poem to a revised publication of the story in 1845. In the revised story, the poem is composed by the eponymous Ligeia, and taught to the narrator in the fits of her death throes.

== Synopsis ==
An audience of weeping angels watches a play performed by "mimes, in the form of God on high", and controlled by vast formless shapes looming behind the scenes. The mimes chase a "Phantom" which they can never capture, running around in circles. Finally, a monstrous "crawling shape" emerges, and eats the mimes. The final curtain comes down, "a funeral pall", signaling an end to the "tragedy, 'Man'", whose only hero is "The Conqueror Worm".

== Publication history ==
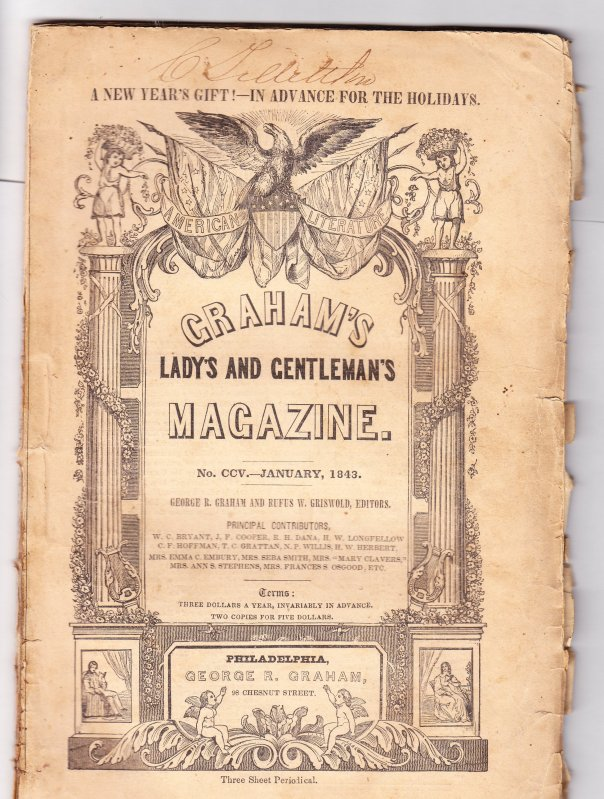
The poem first appeared in Graham's Gentleman's Magazine, January, 1843 issue, No. CCV, Philadelphia.

"The Conqueror Worm" was first published as a stand-alone poem in the January 1843 issue of Graham's Magazine. Shortly after, it was included among several other poems by Poe in the February 25 issue of the Saturday Museum in a feature called "The Poets & Poetry of Philadelphia: Edgar Allan Poe". It was later included in Poe's poetry collection The Raven and Other Poems in 1845. That same year, it was incorporated into "Ligeia" for the first time when the story was reprinted in the February 15, 1845, issue of the New York World. "Ligeia" was again republished with "The Conqueror Worm" in the September 27, 1845, issue of The Broadway Journal while Poe was its editor. This was not unusual for Poe, who had also incorporated poems "The Coliseum" and "To One in Paradise" into tales.

== Text ==
Lo! 'tis a gala night
Within the lonesome latter years!
An angel throng, bewinged, bedight
In veils, and drowned in tears,
Sit in a theatre, to see
A play of hopes and fears,
While the orchestra breathes fitfully
The music of the spheres.

Mimes, in the form of God on high,
Mutter and mumble low,
And hither and thither fly—
Mere puppets they, who come and go
At bidding of vast formless things
That shift the scenery to and fro,
Flapping from out their Condor wings
Invisible Wo!

That motley drama—oh, be sure
It shall not be forgot!
With its Phantom chased for evermore,
By a crowd that seize it not,
Through a circle that ever returneth in
To the self-same spot,
And much of Madness, and more of Sin,
And Horror the soul of the plot.

But see, amid the mimic rout
A crawling shape intrude!
A blood-red thing that writhes from out
The scenic solitude!
It writhes!—it writhes!—with mortal pangs
The mimes become its food,
And the angels sob at vermin fangs
In human gore imbued.

Out—out are the lights—out all!
And, over each quivering form,
The curtain, a funeral pall,
Comes down with the rush of a storm,
And the angels, all pallid and wan,
Uprising, unveiling, affirm
That the play is the tragedy, "Man,"
And its hero the Conqueror Worm.

== Interpretation ==
Poe's mother and father were both actors, and the poem uses theater metaphors throughout to deal with human life on a universal level.

The poem seems to imply that human life is mad folly ending in hideous death, the universe is controlled by dark forces man cannot understand, and the only supernatural forces that might help are powerless spectators who can only affirm the tragedy of the scene.

Though Poe was referring to an ancient connection between worms and death, he may have been inspired by "The Proud Ladye", a poem by Spencer Wallis Cone which was reviewed in an 1840 issue of Burton's Gentleman's Magazine. That poem contained the lines "Let him meet the conqueror worm / With his good sword by his side".

"The Conqueror Worm" also uses the word "evermore", which would later evolve into "nevermore" in Poe's famous poem "The Raven" in 1845.

=== Role in "Ligeia" ===
The poem plays an important symbolic role as part of its inclusion in the short story "Ligeia." The poem is written by Ligeia as she is dying, though it is actually recited by the narrator, her husband.

Because it emphasizes the finality of death, it calls to question Ligeia's resurrection in the story. Also, the inclusion of the bitter poem may have been meant to be ironic or a parody of the convention at the time, both in literature and in life. In the mid-19th century it was common to emphasize the sacredness of death and the beauty of dying (examples include Charles Dickens's Little Johnny character in Our Mutual Friend and the death of Helen Burns in Charlotte Brontë's Jane Eyre). Instead, Ligeia speaks of fear personified in the "blood-red thing."

== Adaptations ==
In 1935, Baltimore-born composer Franz Bornschein wrote a three-part chorus for women with orchestra or piano accompaniment based on "The Conqueror Worm". The poem was also rewritten and adapted as the first track to Lou Reed's 2003 album of Poe adaptations and Poe-inspired songs, The Raven. It was also adapted as a song by the darkwave act Sopor Aeternus & the Ensemble of Shadows on the album Flowers in Formaldehyde in 2004. Vol. 5 of the Hellboy comic book mini-series by Mike Mignola titled Hellboy: Conqueror Worm was based on the poem.

The British horror film Witchfinder General was retitled The Conqueror Worm for U.S. release. Although American International Pictures' prints featured a voice-over with Vincent Price in character as Matthew Hopkins reciting "The Conqueror Worm", the film is not actually an adaptation of Poe's poem.

Dark Horse Comics released Edgar Allan Poe Conqueror Worm, a one-shot comic by Richard Corben in November 2012.

The music video for "Curtain" by Australian extreme metal band Portal features an adaptation of the poem using puppets.

The album Dies Irae by the band Devil Doll is loosely based on "The Conqueror Worm". The text of the poem is paraphrased liberally, and the entire final stanza of the poem is reproduced almost verbatim.

Goth musician Voltaire wrote a song adaptation of "The Conqueror Worm" and followed the text of the poem verbatim. It was released in early 2014 on his album Raised by Bats.

John Kennedy Toole's final known work was titled "The Conquerer Worm", though the contents of the writing has been lost.
