= Simpkin & Marshall =

British book publisher, bookseller and book wholesaler

Simpkin & Marshall was a British bookseller, wholesaler and publisher. The firm was founded in 1819 and traded until the 1940s. For many decades the firm was Britain's largest book wholesaler and a respected family-owned company, but it was acquired by the media proprietor Robert Maxwell and went bankrupt in 1954, an event which, according to Lionel Leventhal, "sounded a warning to the book trade about Captain Robert Maxwell's way of doing business".

== 19th century ==
In the years just before 1814 Benjamin Crosby and two assistants, William Simpkin (whose daughter married the publisher Henry George Bohn) and Richard Marshall, ran a firm "supplying provincial firms with books and acting as an agent for their publications". Following Crosby's illness with paralysis in 1814, the firm became known as Simpkin and Marshall.

In 1828 the firm changed its name to Simpkin, Marshall & Co. and in 1837 it was based at Stationers' Hall Court, London. The firm became the largest book wholesaler in the United Kingdom.

In 1889 the three firms, Simpkin, Marshall & Co. Hamilton, Adams & Co., and W. Kent & Co., merged to form Simpkin, Marshall, Hamilton, Kent & Co. The firm was, however, still generally referred to by the general public as Simpkin & Marshall. By 1900 the firm enjoyed "almost monopoly status as a book wholesaler".

As a book publisher Simpkin & Marshall was a generalist, with numerous fiction and nonfiction titles. In the second half of the nineteenth century it published many yellowback and paperback books, including the series "The Run and Read Library", the "Bristol Library" and "almost all of the novels" of the popular Victorian novelist Mary E. Braddon.

== Acquisition by Robert Maxwell ==
In the early 1950s Simpkin Marshall, as the firm was then commonly known, was a book wholesaler with debts of $A575,000. Robert Maxwell purchased it for the sum of $A115,000 and it continued to operate as a publishing warehouse company and a wholesale book distribution company within his business empire. He used the company to raise funds, on which it paid interest, but then made generous interest-free loans to his private companies. In four years, he "ran the company into the ground". According to Edward Pearce, Maxwell had used the "high reputation of the old-fashioned family company he had taken over... for purposes of predatory credit". Simpkin, Marshall was declared insolvent in 1954 and its assets and good will were purchased by Hatchards.

== Book series ==
Book series published by Simpkin & Marshall and by Simpkin, Marshall, Hamilton, Kent & Co. included:

- The Abbey Classics
- The Analytical Series of Greek and Latin Classics
- Anglers' Evenings (First Series; etc.)
- Beacon Library
- The Beechwood Books
- Breare Vocal Series
- The Bygone Series
- Clark's College Series of Text-Books
- Crossley's Comprehensive Class Book
- Curtis's Educational Series
- The Devotional Series
- Dr. Cornwell's Educational Series
- Echoes of Exmoor (First Series; etc.)
- Edinburgh Series of Monographs on Art
- Eton School Lists
- Evergreen Library Series
- Farming Essays (First Series; etc.)
- Gill's School Series
- The Gravure Series
- The Guide Series
- Hardwicke's Science-Gossip: An Illustrated Medium of Interchange and Gossip for Studies and Lovers of Nature
- Historic Houses in Bath and Their Associations
- In Tune With Nature
- Irish Texts Society
- Kind Words to All Classes
- The Jane Series
- Jerrold's Jest Book Series
- Kneetime Animal Stories
- Lancashire Worthies
- Library Association Series
- Medieval Studies
- The 101 Series
- Old Friends And New Acquaintances
- Our Country's Series
- Oxberry's New English Drama Series
- Poems of Eliza Cook (First Series; etc.)
- Popular Edition
- Popular Music Series
- Popular School Books Series
- The Quiet Hour Series
- Railroadiana
- The Repertory of Patent Inventions, and other discoveries & improvements in Arts, Manufactures, and Agriculture
- Rosemary Booklets
- The Run and Read Library
- Seventy Sermon Outlets
- Simpkin's Thin-paper Classics
- Simple Records (First Series; etc.)
- Tales of a Grandfather: Being Stories Taken from Scottish History
- Then and Now
- Tourist Rambles in the Northern and Midland Counties
- Towards New Culture
- Walbran's British Angler Salmon, Trout and Grayling: How, When and Where to Catch Them (First Series; etc.)
- Walbran's British Wrangler (First Series; etc.)
- The Waverley Novels
- The Women of The Poets

=== Series jointly published with other publishers ===
- Abel Heywood & Sons Series of Illustrated Guide Books (jointly published with Abel Heywood & Sons)
- Alembic Club Reprint (jointly published with William F. Clay)
- Arrowsmith's Bristol Library Series (jointly published with J. W. Arrowsmith and Kent & Co. Limited)
- Arrowsmith's Three & Sixpenny Series (AKA Arrowsmith's 3/6 Series) (jointly published with J. W. Arrowsmith)
- The Botanic Garden (commonly referred to as: Maund's Botanic Garden) (jointly published with Baldwin and Cradock)
- Chronicles of the Canongate (jointly published with Cadell and Co.)
- Coles' and Tomlin's School (with several other publishers)
- Cook's Traveller's Handbooks (jointly published with Thomas Cook & Son)
- Edinburgh Cabinet Library (jointly published with Oliver & Boyd)
- Oliver and Boyd's "Continuous" Readers series (jointly published with Oliver & Boyd)
- Popular Tales and Romances of the Northern Nations (jointly published with John Henry Bohte, London and J. Anderson, Edinburgh)
- The Vellum-Parchment Shilling Series of Miscellaneous Literature (jointly published with Field and Tuer)
- Welsh Lyrics of the Nineteenth Century (jointly published with Jarvis & Foster)
