= William Henry Leeds =

English architectural critic and journalist

William Henry Leeds (1786–1866) was an English architectural critic and journalist.

== Life ==
Leeds was born in 1786 in Norfolk. He was credited by John George Cochrane and others as one of the anonymous translators of the anthology of German short stories Popular Tales and Romances of the Northern Nations (1823). Leeds was a frequent contributor to the Foreign Quarterly Review in the 1830s, writing for them on Russian literature as well as architecture. In the 1840s he wrote for the Westminster Review. From 1839 to 1854 he edited the Civil Engineer's and Architect's Journal, and from 1855 to 1856 edited Land and Building News.

He translated Georg Moller's Memorials of German Gothic architecture and edited a revised edition of Decorative Part of Civil Architecture by William Chambers.

== Works ==
- (transl.) Popular Tales and Romances of the Northern Nations, London: W. Simpkin, R. Marshall and J. H. Bohte, 1823
- (transl.) Moller's Memorials of German-Gothic Architecture; with additional notes and illustrations from Stirglitz, etc., London: John Weale, 1836
- Illustrations of the public buildings of London: with descriptions of each edifice, 1838
- 'an essay on the present state of architectural study and the revival of the Italian style', published with Charles Barry's The Travellers' Club House (1839)
- Rudimentary architecture for the use of beginners and students. The orders, and their æsthetic principles, London, J. Weale, 1852
- (ed.) Decorative Part of Civil Architecture by William Chambers, 1866
