= Thomas Simpson Cooke =

Irish singer and composer

Thomas Simpson Cooke (July 1782 – 26 February 1848) was an Irish composer, conductor, singer, theatre musician and music director – an influential figure in early 19th-century opera in London.

== Life ==
Mostly referred to as "Tom Cooke", he was born in Dublin, the son of Bartlett Cooke, an oboist in the theatres of Smock Alley and Crow Street, and co-founder of the Irish Musical Fund (1787), also the owner of a music shop at 45 Dame Street and a music publisher.

Thomas S. Cooke studied both with his father and with Tommaso Giordani, and displayed an early musical talent – his first benefit concert took place at age nine on 14 February 1792 at the Exhibition Room, William Street, Dublin, when he performed on the violin and sang. In 1797, he became leader of the orchestra of Crow Street Theatre and became its music director not long afterwards. At another benefit concert in 1804, he performed a "concertante" on eight instruments, the flute, violin, viola, cello, piano, clarinet, harp, and trumpet, a feat he often repeated with various instruments. In 1805 he married the actress and singer Fanny Howells; their eldest son was Henry Angelo Michael Cooke (1808–1889), later a well-known musician in London.

The Cooke family became friendly with the celebrated soprano Angelica Catalani, after Cooke had led the orchestra at her first Dublin visit in 1807. In 1813, Cooke changed from the orchestra pit to the stage when he first appeared in a tenor role as Saraskier in Stephen Storace's opera The Siege of Belgrade (a role originally created by Cooke's compatriot Michael Kelly in 1791). Later in the same year he performed the role at the English Opera House in London, where he decided to stay for the remainder of his life.

On 15 September 1815, Cooke performed for the first time at the Drury Lane Theatre (as Don Carlos in Thomas Linley's The Duenna) and remained its leading tenor for the next 20 years. He had a particular talent for seafaring characters, which gave rise to the phrase "in the style à la Tom Cooke". He was also involved in productions at Lyceum and Haymarket theatres and at Covent Garden. Cooke was music director of the Vauxhall Gardens concerts (1828–30) and the principal tenor at the chapel of the Bavarian embassy in Warwick Street until 1838. Having published a singing tutor in 1828, he also became a much-demanded singing teacher, numbering among his pupils later celebrities including Elizabeth Rainforth, John Sims Reeves, John Templeton, Margaretta Graddon, Maria Tree, and others. Cooke died at his home in Great Portland Street in 1848 and was buried at Kensal Green.

== Music ==
Cooke was a prolific composer from early adolescence. In Dublin he had composed a number of orchestral overtures to theatrical performances and many songs. An early success was the comic opera The First Attempt, or The Whim of the Moment to a libretto by Sydney Owenson (Lady Morgan). In this work and in the later Thierna-na-Oge, or The Prince of the Lakes (1829), Cooke clearly referred to Celtic-Irish legends. On the whole, Cooke was not known to be particularly original; he mostly collaborated with others in his compositions, including Henry Bishop, C.E. Horn and David Braham. As such he is associated with over 50 productions at Drury Lane. He also adapted ("Cooke'd") works by Auber, Boieldieu, Halévy, Hérold, and Rossini in a manner he thought more fit for the British stage.

== Selected compositions ==
Operas (original works only)

- Peleus and Thetis (Dublin, 1797)
- The Mountain Witches (Dublin, 1800)
- The Hunter of the Alps (libretto: W. Dimond) (Dublin, 1805)
- The Five Lovers (Dublin, 1806)
- The First Attempt (Dublin, 1807)
- Rugantino (after Pixérécourt) (Dublin, c. 1813)
- Frederick the Great (S.J. Arnold) (London, 1814)
- The King's Proxy (S.J. Arnold) (London, 1815)
- The Magpie (T.J. Dibdin after Caigniez) (London, 1815)
- The Merchant of Bruges (D. Kinniard after Brome) (London, 1815)
- The Count of Anjou (G. Lambe) (London, 1816)
- Bertram (C.R. Maturin) (London, 1816)
- Cry To-day and Laugh To-morrow (E. Knight) (London, 1816)
- Frightened to Death! (W.C. Oulton) (London, 1817)
- Manuel (C.R. Maturin) (London, 1817)
- The Innkeeper's Daughter (G. Soane) (London, 1817)
- The Falls of Clyde (G. Soane) (London, 1817)
- Amoroso (J.R. Planché) (London, 1818)
- Sigesmar the Switzer (C.E. Walker) (London, 1818)
- Barmecide (H.M. Milner) (London, 1818)
- Flodden Field (S. Kemble after Scott) (London, 1818)
- The Heroine (R. Phillips) (London, 1819)
- The Italians (C. Bucke) (London, 1819)
- Honour (London, 1819)
- The Jew of Lubeck (H.M. Milner) (London, 1819)
- Coriolanus (R.W. Elliston after Shakespeare) (London, 1820)
- Shakespeare versus Harlequin (C. Dibdin after Garrick) (London, 1820)
- David Rizzio (R. Hamilton, C. Dibdin) (London, 1820)
- Justice (J.S. Faucit) (London, 1820)
- The Kind Imposter (after Cibber) (London, 1821)
- Geraldi Duval (C.E. Walker) (London, 1821)
- The Veteran Soldier (E. Knight) (London, 1822)
- Almoren and Hamet (J.H. Amherst) (London, 1822)
- A Tale of Other Times (T.J. Dibdin) (London, 1822)
- Sweethearts and Wives (J. Kenney) (London, 1823)
- Actors al fresco (W.T. Moncrieff) (London, 1823)
- Faustus (G. Soane & Terry after Goethe) (London, 1825)
- The Coronation of Charles X. in Five Minutes too Late (G. Colman) (London, 1825)
- The Wager (Mrs. Inchbald) (London, 1825)
- Malvina (G. MacFarren) (London, 1826)
- Oberon (G. MacFarren) (London, 1826)
- The Boy of Santillane (G. MacFarren) (London, 1827)
- Peter the Great (T. Morton, J. Kenney after du Petit-Méré) (London, 1829)
- Thierna-na-Oge (J.R. Planché) (London, 1829)
- The Greek Family (R.J. Raymond) (London, 1829)
- The Brigand Chief (J.R. Planché) (London, 1829)
- The Dragon's Gift (J.R. Planché) (London, 1830)
- The Ice Witch (J.P. Buckstone) (London, 1831)
- Hyder Ali (Alfred Bunn) (London, 1831)
- The Magic Car (London, 1832)
- St. Patrick's Eve (T. Power) (London, 1832)
- King Arthur and the Knights of the Round Table (Pocock after Scott) (London, 1834)
- The Child of the Wreck (J.R. Planché) (London, 1837)
- Prologue to Handel's Acis and Galatea (London, 1842)
- The Follies of a Night (J.R. Planché) (London, 1842)

Other

- Trio for 2 violins and cello (Dublin, c. 1805)
- Six Glees, for 3–4 voices and piano (London, 1844)
- many orchestral overtures
- songs, glees and catches
- piano works

== Recordings ==
- Over Hill, Over Dale (words by William Shakespeare), duo for tenor, baritone and piano, performed by John Horton Murray (tenor), Michael McFarlane (baritone), Brian Taylor (piano), on: Parlor Discs PD 104 (CD, 2005).
