= Leonhard Wächter =

German writer and historian (1762–1837)

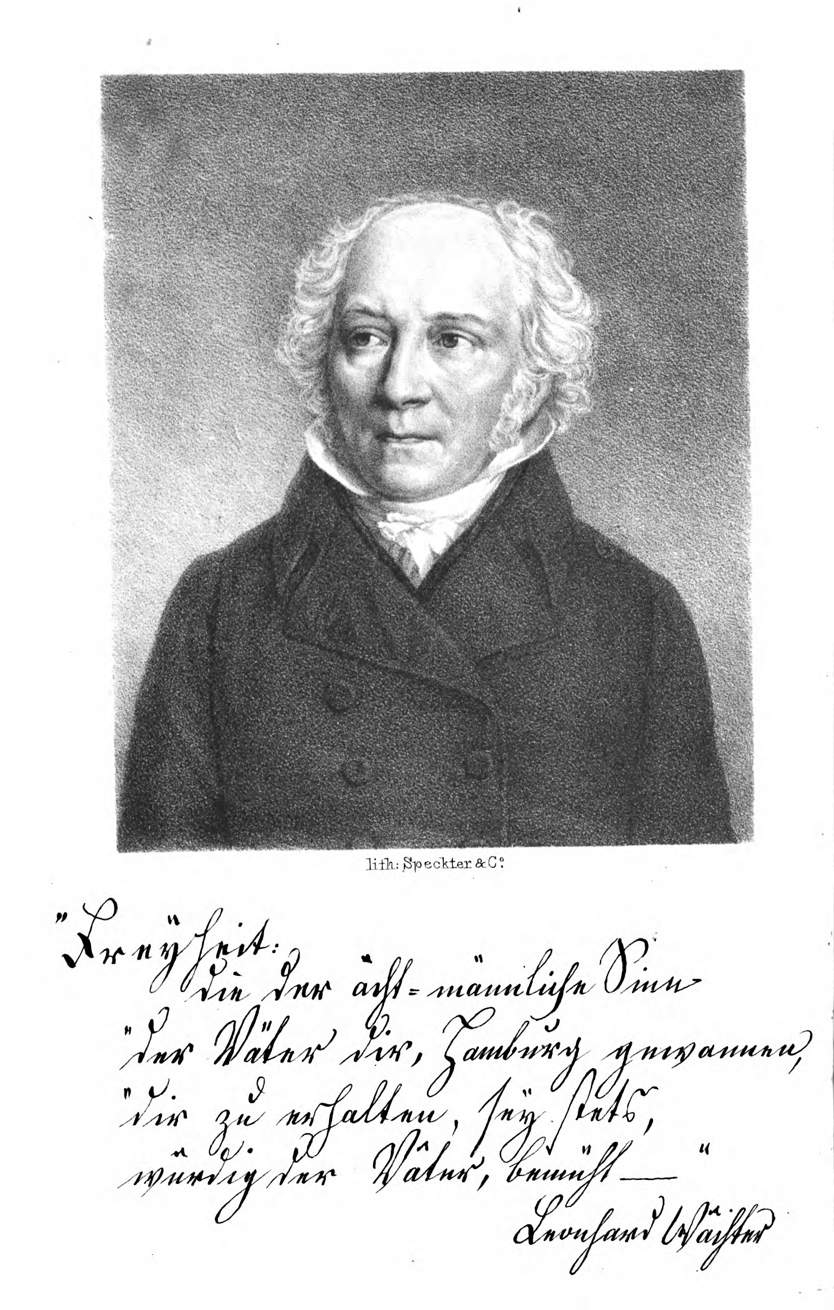
Portrait of Wächter published in 1838

Leonhard Wächter (25 November 1762 — 11 February 1837) was a German writer and historian who often published under the pseudonym Veit Weber. His most well-known work of fiction was Sagen der Vorzeit ('Legends of the Past'), a seven volume idealized account of Germany in the middle ages. The work influenced several 18th- and early 19th-century Gothic novelists in both Britain and France. According to the Germanist James Taft Hatfield, it also had an influence on Goethe's poem "Im ernsten Beinhaus".
