= Margaretta Graddon =

Margarita Graddon
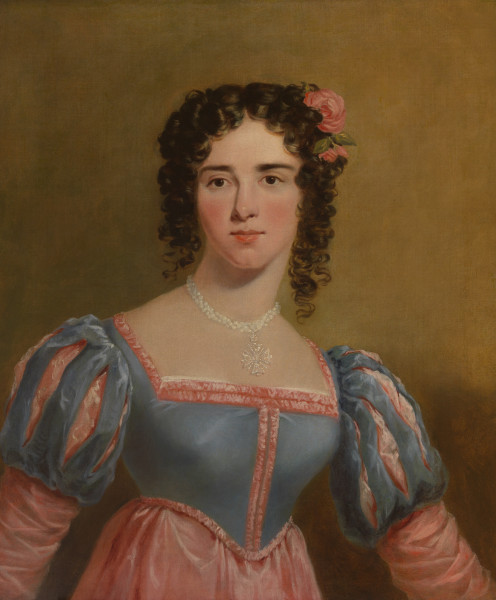
- as Linda by William Brockedon
- Born: 1804; Taunton
- Died: Unknown
- Education: Tom Cooke
- Occupation: Singer
- Known for: Miss Graddon
- Spouse: Alexander Gibbs

Margarita Graddon or Mrs Gibbs (born 1804) was a British popular singer.

== Life ==
Graddon was born in Bishops Lydeard near Taunton in 1804. She was trained by Tom Cooke and then sang in the provinces until she appeared at Vauxhall Gardens in 1822, later in Dublin, and then at Drury Lane Theatre in 1824 in The Marriage of Figaro. The same year she appeared in Henry Bishop's version of Der Freischütz. Her appearance as Linda was recorded in a portrait by William Brockedon. In June 1826, she performed a noted rendition of Mozart's Requiem in honor of the death of composer Carl Maria von Weber.

In 1827 she married a pianoforte maker named Alexander Gibbs. There was a pianoforte company called Graddon and Gibbs.

She toured in the United States in 1834 and 1835. In 1844 she was again appearing at Vauxhall and being paid five pounds a week.

She was credited with writing a polka titled "Le Bal Costumél" and she appears on the cover of the sheet music, but the music is also attributed to her husband. She was last mentioned in 1855 when she was appearing in The Lakes of Killarney in New York.
