= Jonathan Blewitt =

English composer

Jonathan Blewitt (19 July 1782 – 4 September 1853) was an English organist, composer of light operas and songs, and a musical director.

== Early career ==
Blewitt was born in London. His father, Jonas Blewitt (died 1805), was a distinguished organist in the late 18th century, author of A Complete Treatise on the Organ, and Ten Voluntaries and Twelve Preludes for the organ.

He was educated by his father and his godfather Jonathan Battishill, and he is said to have received some instruction from Joseph Haydn. At the age of eleven he acted as deputy to his father, and subsequently he held several appointments as organist in London. He was also organist at Haverhill, Suffolk, and at Brecon, where he remained for three years.

In about 1808 he returned to London for the production of an opera he had written for Drury Lane, but the theatre was burnt down before the work was produced. In 1810 he was appointed organist at Sheffield Cathedral.

== Ireland ==
In 1811 Blewitt moved to Ireland, where he was a private organist of Lord Cahir. He was appointed organist of St. Andrew's, Dublin; in 1813 he became composer and director of music at the Theatre Royal. He was appointed by the Duke of Leinster as organist to the Freemasons of Ireland. When J. B. Logier came to Ireland to introduce his system of music teaching, Blewitt joined him and was successful as a teacher; his book An Epitome of the Logerian System of Harmony was published in Dublin.

== London theatres ==
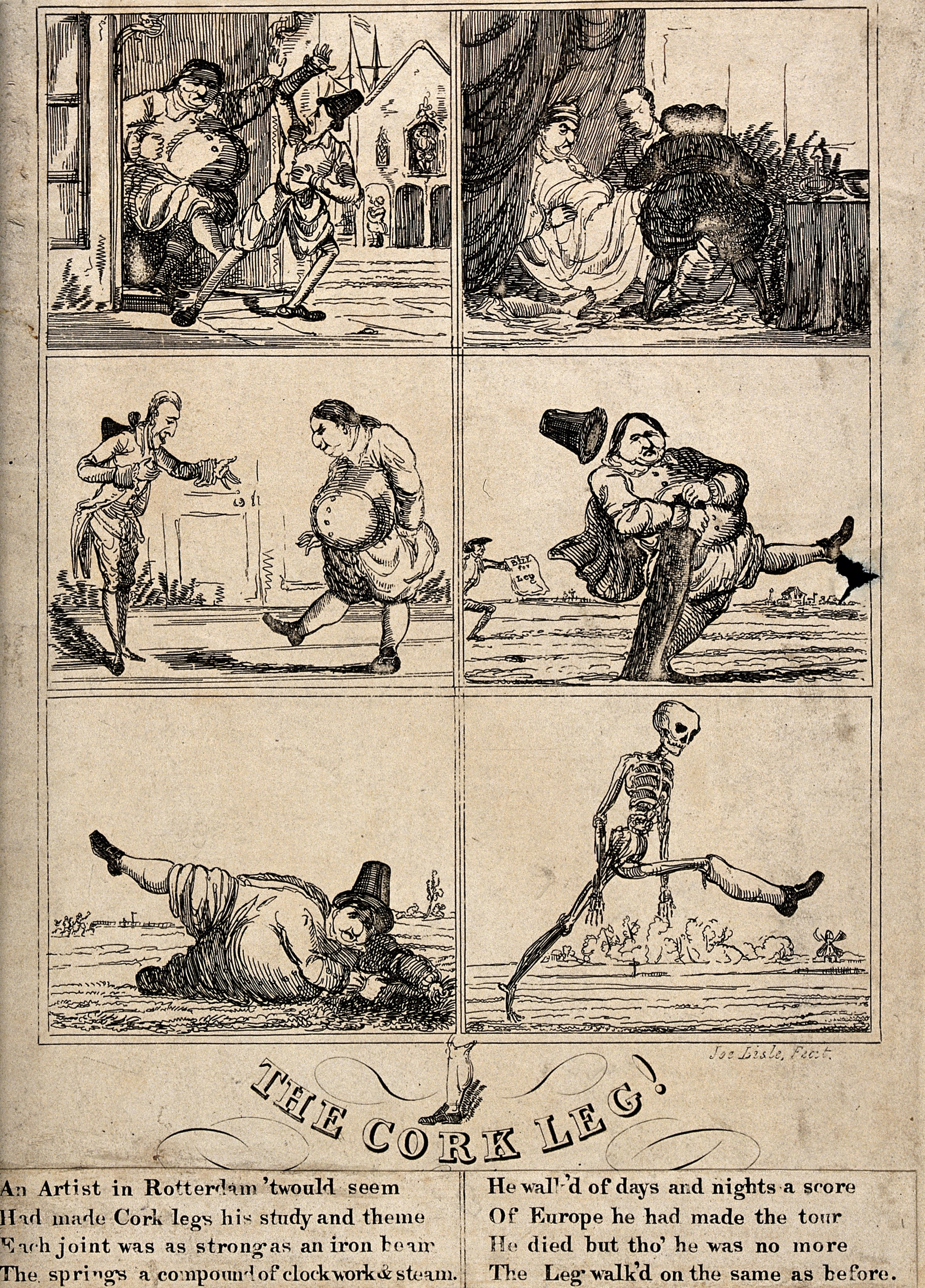
Illustration on the song-sheet The Cork Leg: a comic song by Thomas Hudson set to music by Jonathan Blewitt

In 1820 Blewitt moved to London and began the long series of pantomime compositions, light operas and songs with which his name was connected for the rest of his life. For more than twenty-five years he wrote music for most of the London theatres; his last work, Harlequin Hudibras, opened at Drury Lane on 27 December 1852.

In 1828 and 1829 he was director of music at Sadler's Wells Theatre, and he was also, at different times, musical director at Vauxhall Gardens, at the Tivoli Gardens in Margate, and pianist to John Templeton's "Vocal Entertainments". He wrote a few light operas and a large amount of vocal music, most of them comic songs, for which he was celebrated, such as Barney Brallaghan.

In his last years Blewitt sank into poverty. He died in London on 4 September 1853, and was buried at St. Pancras Cemetery. He left a widow and two daughters.
