= John George Cochrane =

British editor and librarian

John George Cochrane (1781–1852) was a Scottish editor and bibliographer, also a librarian, with a general knowledge of literary history.

== Life ==
Cochrane was born in Glasgow, where his father was engaged in the law. Having received some education he was placed with a bookseller, but set out to seek his fortune in London before he was twenty. Here, after a residence of some years, he entered into partnership with John White, and the firm of White, Cochrane Co. carried on an extensive business in Fleet Street, until they became involved in the major trade ruin which followed the failure of Archibald Constable.

Cochrane later became manager of the foreign bookselling house of Messrs. Treuttel, Wurtz, Treuttel junior, and Richter of Soho Square, who published in July 1827 the first number of the Foreign Quarterly Review. The editorship was accepted by Cochrane. The review was brought out by the same firm to the twenty-fourth number (October 1833) inclusive, and by their successor, Adolphus Richter, to the twenty-seventh (August 1834). The twenty-eighth number (December 1834) was issued by Cochrane at his own risk. Richter became bankrupt on 9 December 1834, and Cochrane established Cochrane's Foreign Quarterly Review (1835); but only two numbers appeared. The Foreign Quarterly Review (Note: A list of the contributors to the first fourteen volumes of which may be seen in Notes and Queries, 2nd ser. viii. 124-7.) came to an end in 1846, and was then incorporated with the Westminster Review. Cochrane was an unsuccessful candidate for the librarianship of the Faculty of Advocates in Edinburgh, and for some time in that city acted as the editor of the Caledonian Mercury.

Cochrane later lived for some time at Hertford as editor of a local newspaper. On 17 February 1841 he became the first secretary and librarian of the London Library, founded in the previous year. This institution was opened on 3 May 1842 at 49 Pall Mall. In April 1845 the committee took a lease of 14 St James's Square, a house on the site still occupied by the library.

Cochrane died at his apartments in the library on 11 May 1852, in his seventy-second year. In the view of Henry Tedder, who wrote Cochrane's biography in the DNB, "Cochrane was a zealous and able librarian, with an excellent knowledge of bibliography and literary history".

== Works ==
Cochrane wrote a pamphlet, "The Case stated between the Public Libraries and the Booksellers" (anon. 1813), calling attention to the hardship suffered by publishers, who were then obliged, under the Copyright Act, to supply copies of their most expensive books to eleven public libraries. He and his partner were examined before the parliamentary committee of 1813. The minutes of evidence include a list of works, such as James Sowerby's English Botany, Aylmer Bourke Lambert's Genus Pinus, and so on, published by them. The select committee of 1818 recommended that only five copies should be claimed for public libraries in future, which was made law by the statute of 1835.

A friendship with Robert Cadell caused him to be chosen to catalogue Sir Walter Scott's library at Abbotsford. It was necessary to print the catalogue, and extra copies were struck off for members of the Maitland and Bannatyne Clubs (1838). References to passages in Scott's writings connected with the books throw light on Scott's literary history. The first catalogue of the London Library (1842) was issued by Cochrane. In 1847 an enlarged edition of the catalogue appeared, and a short time before his death a supplementary volume, in which a general classified index is announced.

He also published The English Works of Roger Ascham, preceptor to Queen Elizabeth, a new edition [ed. by J. G. Cochrane], London, 1815, which includes a life by Samuel Johnson.
