= John Gillies (historian) =

Scottish tutor, historian and man of letters (1747–1836)

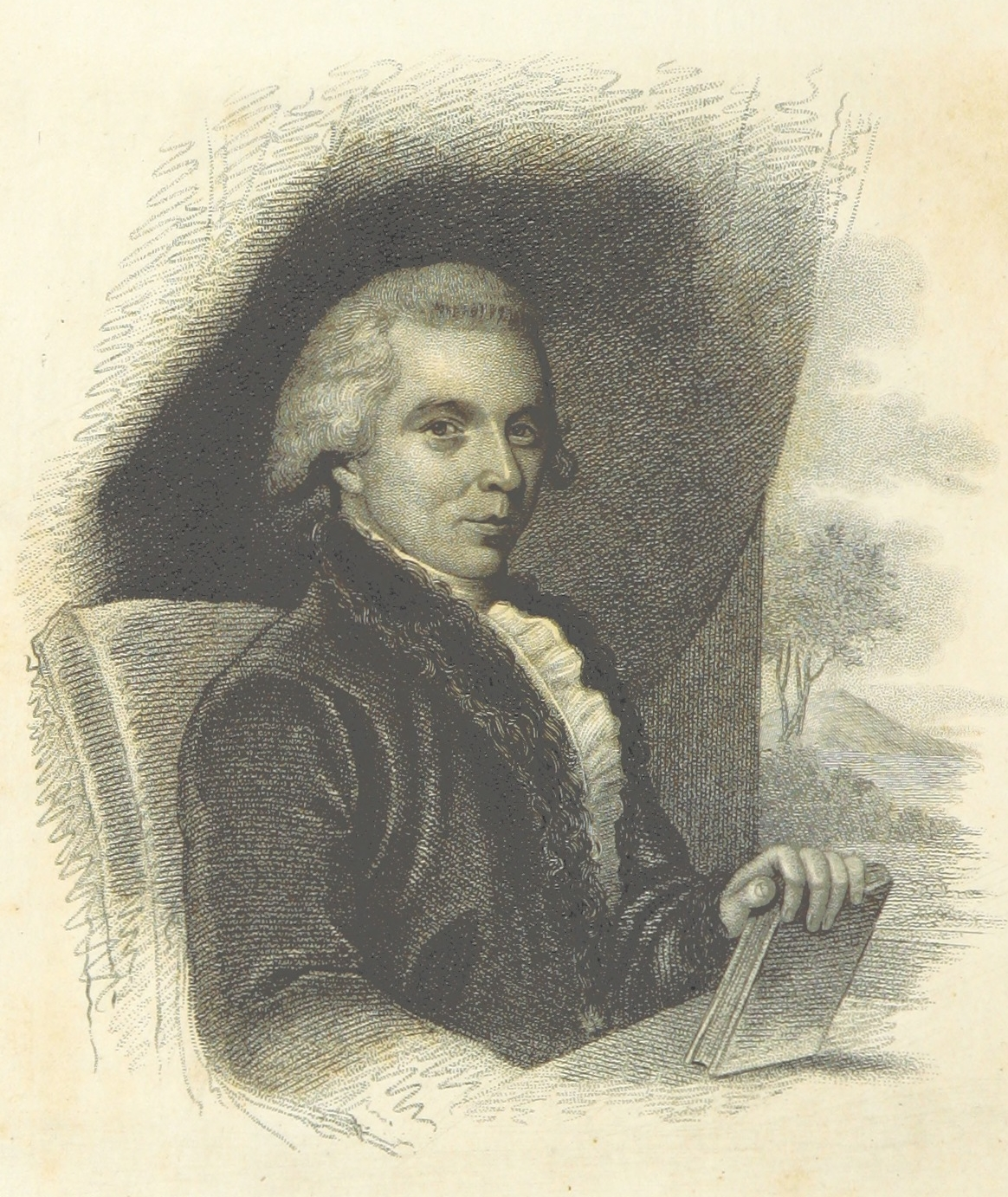
John Gillies (c. 1820)

John Gillies FRSE FRS FSA (/ˈɡɪliːz/; 1747–1836) was a Scottish tutor, historian and man of letters.

== Life ==
Gillies was born at Brechin, in Forfarshire, the son of Robert Gillies of Little Keithock, a merchant, and his wife, Margaret Smith. He was educated in Brechin and then sent to the University of Glasgow, where, at the age of twenty, he acted for a short time as substitute for the professor of Greek. He graduated MA in 1764. He lived for a while in Germany and returned in 1784. He was awarded a doctorate (LLD) in the same year.

He was elected a Fellow of the Royal Society in January 1789.

In 1793 he was elected a Fellow of the Royal Society of Edinburgh. His proposers were James Gregory, William Wright, and John Playfair.

On the death of William Robertson (1721–1793), Gillies was appointed Historiographer Royal for Scotland. In his old age he retired to Clapham, where he died on 15 February 1836. He was the older brother of judge Adam Gillies, Lord Gillies.

== Works ==
His History of Ancient Greece, its Colonies and Conquests was published in 1786; it was translated into French and German. This work was written with a strong monarchist bias. See for instance the opening 'dedication to the king': 'The history of Greece exposes the dangerous turbulence of democracy, and arraigns the despotism of tyrants. By describing the incurable evils inherent in every form of Republican policy, it evinces the inestimable benefits resulting to liberty itself from the lawful dominion of hereditary kings, and the steady operation of well-regulated monarchy'.

Other works included:

- View of the Reign of Frederic II of Prussia, with a Parallel between that Prince and Philip II of Macedon (1789), rather a panegyric than a critical history;
- translations of Aristotle's Rhetoric (1823) and Ethics and Politics (1786–1797);
- translations of the Orations of Lysias and Isocrates (1778)
- History of the World from Alexander to Augustus (1807).
