= Ernst Raupach =

19th-century German dramatist

Ernst Benjamin Salomo Raupach
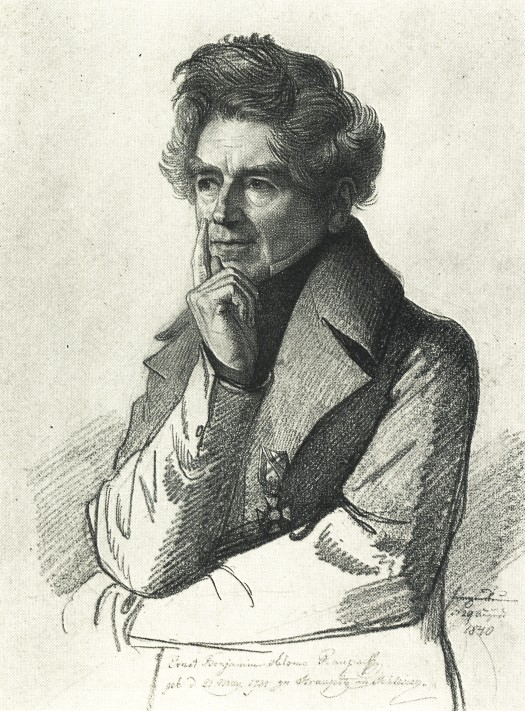
- Portrait by Carl Christian Vogel von Vogelstein (1840)

Ernst Benjamin Salomo Raupach (21 May 1784 – 18 March 1852) was a German dramatist.

== Biography ==
He was born at Straupitz (Polish: Strupice), near Liegnitz in Silesia, a son of the village pastor. He attended the gymnasium at Liegnitz, and studied theology at the university of Halle. In 1804 he obtained a tutorship in St Petersburg. He preached at times in the German Lutheran church, wrote his first tragedies, and in 1817 was appointed professor of German literature and history at a training college in connection with the university.

Owing to an outburst of jealousy against Germans in Russia, culminating in police supervision, Raupach left St Petersburg in 1822 and undertook a journey to Italy. The literary fruits of his travels were Hirsemeuzels Briefe aus und über Italien (Hirsemeuzel's Letters from and about Italy, 1823). He next visited Weimar, but, being coldly received by Goethe, abandoned his idea of living there and settled in 1824 in Berlin. Here he spent the remainder of his life, writing for the stage, which for twenty years he greatly influenced, if not wholly controlled, in the Prussian capital. He died in Berlin on 18 March 1852.

== Works ==
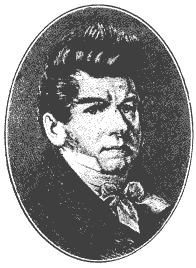
Ernst Raupach

Raupach wrote both tragedies and comedies; of the former, Die Fürsten Chawansky (1818), Der Liebe Zauberkreis (1824), Die Leibeigenen, oder Isidor und Olga (1826), Rafaele (1828), Der Nibelungenhort (1834) and Die Schule des Lebens (1841), and of the latter Die Schleichhändler (1828) and Der Zeitgeist (1830) are pieces which enjoyed great popularity.

The historical dramas with which his name is chiefly associated are Die Hohenstaufen (1837–1838), a cyclus of 15 dramatic pieces founded on Friedrich von Raumer's Geschichte der Hohenstaufen, and the trilogy Cromwell (1841–1844).

Raupach's "Laßt die Todten ruhen" (1822) published in the Minerva: Taschenbuch annual, was an early prose vampire story, which was soon translated into English as "Wake not the Dead" in Popular Tales and Romances of the Northern Nations (1823). It was incorrectly attributed to Ludwig Tieck in the English speaking world for many years, despite German scholars consistently identifying Raupach as the author.

Also noteworthy among his early pieces are: Die Gefesselten (1821) and Die Freunde (1825). Among his comedies may also be mentioned the farces Denk' an Cäsar and Schelle im Monde. Among his posthumous works are: Der Kegelspieler (1853); Mulier Taceat in Ecclesia, a tragi-comedy (1853); and Saat und Frucht (1854). The drama Der Müller und sein Kind was still on the stage in the early 20th century.

Raupach wrote in all about eighty plays, besides letters and poems. His collected dramas appeared under the title Dramatische Werke ernster Gattung (16 vols., 1830–1843) and Dramatische Werke komischer Gattung (4 vols., 1829–1835).

== Evaluation ==
The 1911 Encyclopædia Britannica Eleventh Edition attributed the popularity of his comedies and tragedies to their skillful dramatic handling, but thought the historical dramas cited superficial in treatment. The article conceded a great knowledge of theatrical effect and situations to Raupach, but complained that he contorted historical facts in order to foster support for the separation of church and state.

The 1905 New International Encyclopedia thought his writings display great knowledge of stage effect, a talent for the invention of new and interesting situations, and a fine play of verbal wit.
