= Robert Pearse Gillies =

Scottish poet and writer (1789–1858)

Robert Pearse Gillies (9 November 1789 – 28 November 1858) was a Scottish poet and writer.
