= George Soane =

English writer and dramatist

George Soane (1790–1860) was an English writer and dramatist.

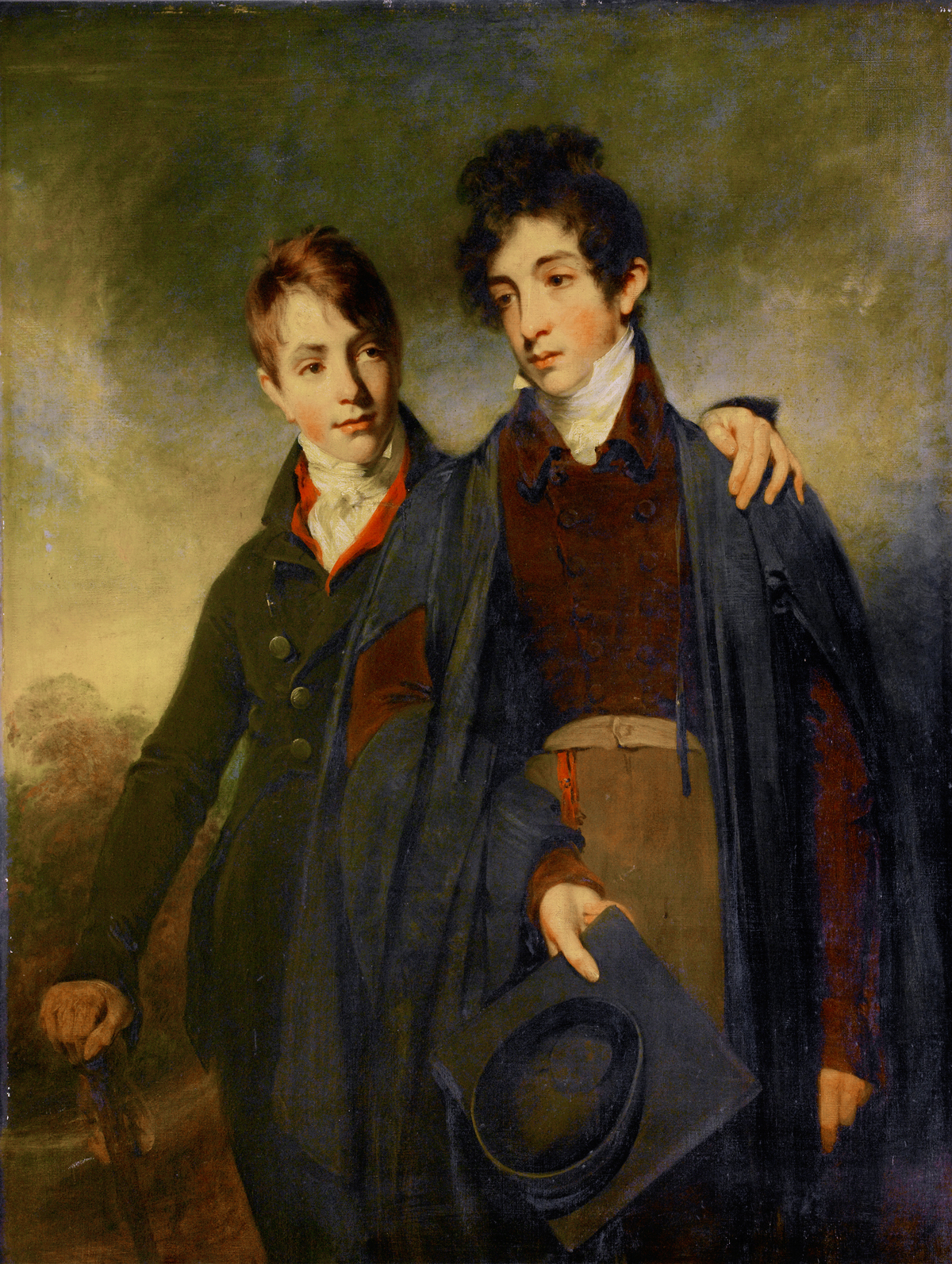
George Soane (left) with his elder brother John, 1805 portrait by William Owen in Sir John Soane's Museum, London.

== Life ==
The younger son of John Soane, he was born in London. He graduated B.A. from Pembroke College, Cambridge, in 1811. Shortly afterwards he married Agnes Boaden, against his parents' wishes. His writing career was not enough to earn a living. Soane fell into debt, and was imprisoned. In 1814 he was editing the Theatrical Inquisitor, but also served time for fraud. He gave evidence on the King's Bench Prison, from his experience of it, to a committee of enquiry in 1815.

In The Champion during September 1815 Soane attacked his father's reputation as an architect, in two anonymous articles. His mother died shortly afterwards. These pieces led to a family rupture, and indirectly to the foundation of Sir John Soane's Museum. Soane attempted to block the private act of Parliament, Sir John Soane's Museum Act 1833 (3 & 4 Will. 4. c. 4 Pr.), that set up the museum's endowment. The matter was debated in the House of Commons for an hour, with William Cobbett putting Soane's side of the argument, that he would be deprived of a rightful inheritance. Joseph Hume spoke in favour of the act, which was passed.

Soane died on 12 July 1860.

== Works ==
=== Drama ===
Soane became known as an author of melodramas.

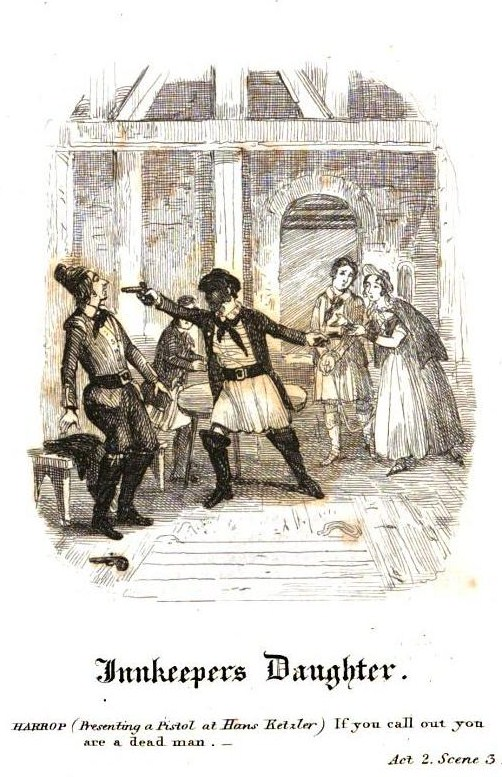
"If you call out you are a dead man!": illustration from the published version of George Soane's The Inn-Keeper's Daughter. It was Soane's first melodrama, based on the poem "Mary, the Maid of the Inn", by Robert Southey.

- The Bohemian: a Tragedy, London, 1817.
- The Falls of Clyde: a Melodrama, London, 1817.
- The Innkeeper's Daughter, Drury Lane, 1817.
- Rob Roy, the Gregarach. A romantick drama, in three acts, etc, Drury Lane, 1818.
- Self-Sacrifice: a Melodrama, London, 1819.
- The Dwarf of Naples: a Tragi-comedy, London, 1819.
- The Hebrew: a Drama, London, 1820.
- Pride shall have a Fall: a Comedy, London, 1824.
- Faustus, or the Demon of Drachenfels, London, 1825.
- Aladdin: a Fairy Opera, London, 1826.
- The Night Dancers: an Opera, London, 1846.
- The Island of Calypso: an Operatic Masque, London, 1850.

=== Other works ===
Soane's other works included:

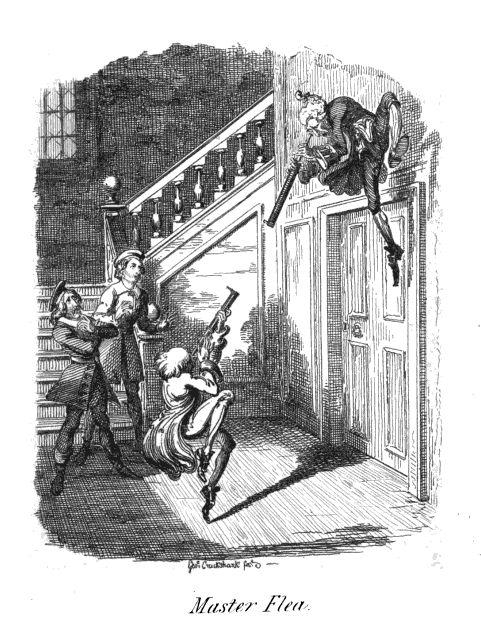
Illustration from Specimens of German Romance by George Soane

- Knight Damon and a Robber Chief, London, 1812.
- The Eve of St. Marco: a Novel, London, 1813.
- The Peasant of Lucerne, London, 1815.
- Specimens of German Romance, London, 1826.
- The Frolics of Puck, London, 1834.
- Life of the Duke of Wellington, London, 1839–40.
- The Last Ball and other Tales, Woking, 1843.
- January Eve: a Tale, London, 1847.
- New Curiosities of Literature, London, 1847.

Soane also made translations from French, German, and Italian. He translated the novella Undine by Friedrich de la Motte Fouqué into English in 1818, and there was a stage version by 1821. He supplied letterpress in 1820, translating some extracts of Goethe's German, when the illustrations by Moritz Retzsch to Faust I were published in London (plates copied by Henry Moses). He was also credited by George Willis as one of the anonymous translators of Popular Tales and Romances of the Northern Nations (1823).

== Notes ==
Attribution

This article incorporates text from a publication now in the public domain: Lee, Sidney, ed. (1898). "Soane, John". Dictionary of National Biography. Vol. 53. London: Smith, Elder & Co.
