= Ernest Farrar =

English composer (1885–1918)

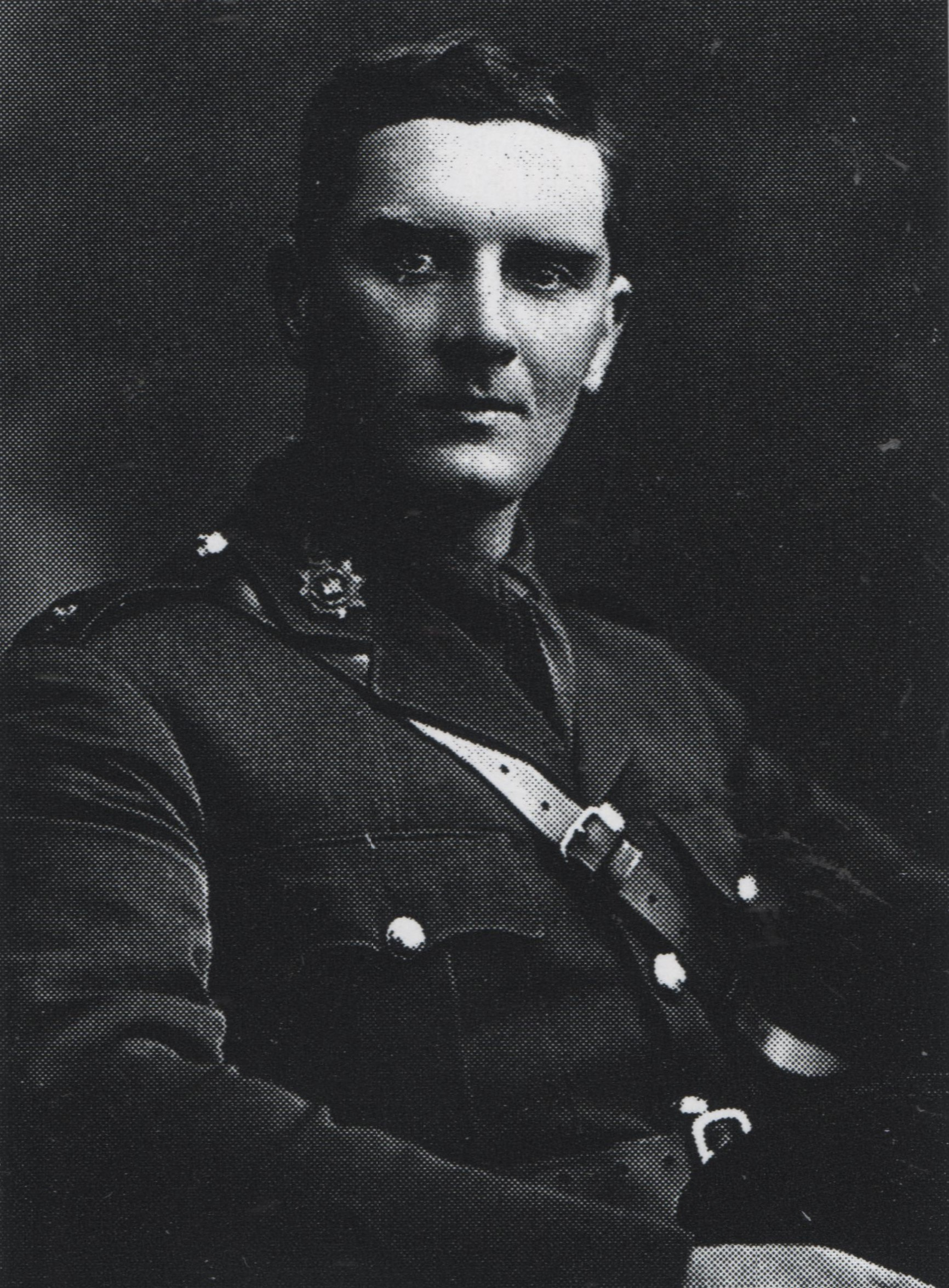
Portrait of Farrar in uniform

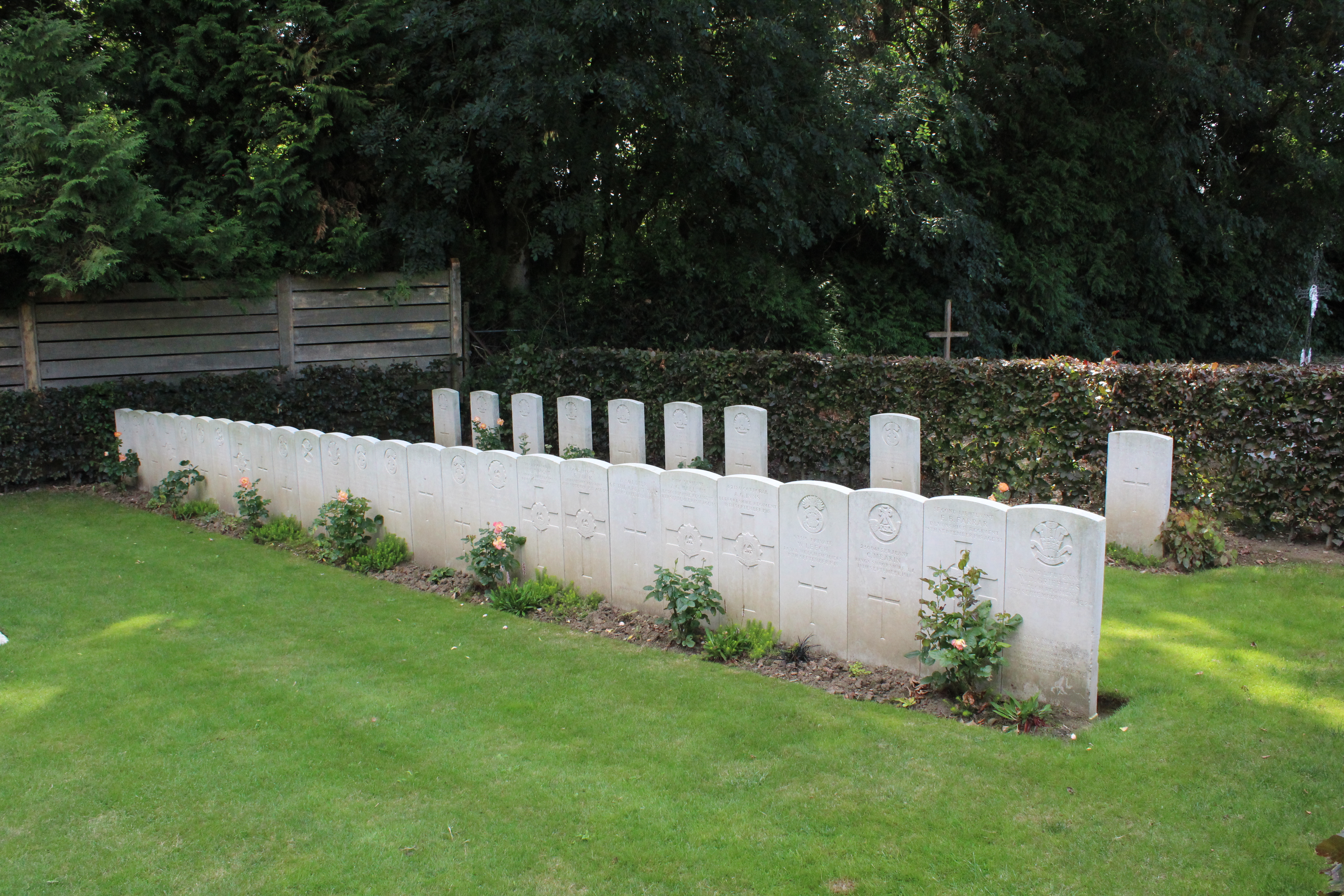
British military cemetery in a corner of the communal cemetery of Ronssoy (second grave from right).

Ernest Bristow Farrar (7 July 1885 – 18 September 1918) was an English composer, pianist and organist.

== Life ==
Ernest Farrar was born in Lewisham, London, but moved in 1887 to Micklefield in Yorkshire, where his father was a clergyman. The rest of his life was very much centred in the north of England. He was educated at Leeds Grammar School, where he began organ studies. His studies at Durham University did not progress beyond his matriculation.

In May 1905 he won a scholarship to the Royal College of Music. There he studied with Sir Charles Villiers Stanford and Sir Walter Parratt and began friendships with Frank Bridge and Geoffrey Molyneux Palmer. He also took up several posts as organist in All Saints' Dresden, St Hilda's, South Shields and Christ Church, High Harrogate. At Harrogate, he worked closely with local conductor Julian Clifford and took on the 14-year-old Gerald Finzi as a composition pupil. In 1913, he married Olive Mason in South Shields. His best man at the wedding was Ernest Bullock.

His career was cut short by the outbreak of World War I, as he enlisted in the Grenadier Guards in 1915 and joined the regiment in August 1916. He was commissioned as Second Lieutenant, 3rd Battalion Devonshire Regiment on 27 February 1918.

Farrar was killed on the Western Front at the Battle of Epehy Ronssoy, near Le Cateau in the Somme Valley south, west of Cambrai, on 18 September 1918. He had been at the front for two days.

His grave lies just outside the churchyard wall in Ronssoy Communal Cemetery Extension, in a corner under a few trees. A Requiem Mass was said at Micklefield, on 29 September, the Feast of St. Michael and All Angels. A concert was dedicated to his memory at Harrogate by Julian Clifford on 17 September 1919, including the tone-poem Lights Out, written expressly for Farrar, and Farrar's Variations in G On An Old British Sea-Song for piano and orchestra. His name is one of the 38 on the War Memorial at the Royal College of Music.

== Works and legacy ==
Despite his short life, Farrar wrote a large body of music for orchestra, voices and organ. His works include The Blessed Damozel, a Celtic Suite and the song cycle Vagabond Songs. Two orchestral pieces, the suite English Pastoral Impressions and the Three Spiritual Studies (for string orchestra) were published posthumously under the Carnegie Collection of British Music imprint. However, apart from a few songs his works are now rarely performed. Stephen Banfield has identified several characteristic traits in Farrar's music, representative of the English pre-war era: the use of folksong (English Pastoral Impressions); "muscular" settings of Walt Whitman (in the choral suite Out of Doors, Op. 14); and intimate lyricism (in Margaritae sorori, a choral setting of words by W. E. Henley from 1916).

Some of his orchestral music has been recorded by the Philharmonia Orchestra on the Chandos label, and some of his songs and organ works have been recorded too.

Today, Farrar is perhaps best known as the teacher of Gerald Finzi, who was deeply affected by Farrar's death. Frank Bridge was also deeply affected, and dedicated his Piano Sonata to the memory of Farrar.

Farrar's work is mentioned several times by Elinor Brent-Dyer in her series of novels for girls, the Chalet School books. Brent-Dyer's biographer, Helen McClelland, notes that Farrar was an organist in Brent-Dyer's home town of South Shields for two years, and that Brent-Dyer knew Farrar's fiancée, Olive Mason, and concludes that "although there is no absolute proof that he and Elinor were acquainted, there is every probability that they were ... Elinor's frequent references to Ernest Farrar in her Chalet School books now constitute his chief memorial.".
