= Benjamin Dale =

English composer and academic

Benjamin James Dale (17 July 1885 – 30 July 1943) was an English composer and academic who had a long association with the Royal Academy of Music. Dale showed compositional talent from an early age and went on to write a small but notable corpus of works. His best-known composition is probably the large-scale Piano Sonata in D minor he started while still a student at the Royal Academy of Music, which communicates in a potent late romantic style. Christopher Foreman has proposed a comprehensive reassessment of Benjamin Dale's music. Dale married one of his students, the pianist and composer Kathleen Richards in 1921.

== Early life and education ==
Benjamin Dale was born in Upper Holloway, Islington, London, to Charles James Dale, a pottery manufacturer from Staffordshire, and his wife, Frances Anne Hallett, daughter of a furniture manufacturer from Clerkenwell. His father, who had migrated first to Derbyshire and then to London, was a director of the Denby Pottery Company and London manager of James Bourne & Son. He was also a self-taught but enthusiastic amateur musician, church organist and Methodist hymn tune writer who nurtured the Finsbury Choral Association (attracting composers such as Sullivan and Stanford to come and conduct their choral works) and founded a Metropolitan College of Music in Holloway that would later become the London College of Music.

Benjamin was the youngest of seven children. One of his brothers was Henry Hallett Dale, a future Nobel Prize-winning physiologist and President of the Royal Society (as well as isolating and describing histamine and acetylcholine, he helped uncover important mechanisms of the immune and nervous systems that would transform contemporary understanding of anaphylaxis, allergy, and immunity). Although ten years Benjamin's elder, Henry always remained close to his younger brother and, like their father, both men had a reputation for being affable and approachable, irrespective of position and fame.

Despite an indifferent record at school, by the age of 14 Dale was already an accomplished organist and had written a small collection of compositions, including a concert overture called Horatius, inspired by Thomas Babington Macaulay. Dale's father arranged for the overture to be played at the Portman Rooms, Baker Street (on 10 May 1900) and was rewarded by a positive review in The Musical Times. Benjamin left school at the age of 15 to enroll as a student of the Royal Academy of Music (RAM). He started at the RAM in September 1900, on the same day as Arnold Bax, another promising pianist-composer, who became a lifelong friend. There he reunited with an early playground companion, the concert pianist and composer York Bowen, who also remained an especially close friend for the rest of Dale's life. Like the others, Dale studied composition under Frederick Corder, a supporter of Wagner and biographer of Liszt who epitomised the progressive musical climate of the RAM under the direction of Alexander Mackenzie (contrasting with the more conservative Royal College of Music, where composition was Stanford's domain).

== Early compositions ==
While studying at the RAM, Dale worked on several compositions, including the first movement of a piano trio, a complete organ sonata, two concert overtures (one inspired by Shakespeare's The Tempest), the Concertstück for organ and orchestra, and his first published work, the Piano Sonata in D minor. The sonata extended to sixty pages, leading to problems in publication, and the Society of British Composers was founded by a group of composers including Frederick Corder, John Blackwood McEwen and Tobias Matthay at the Royal Academy of Music to address that and similar problems. The society published the sonata in its first publication through its imprint Charles Avison, Ltd.

Composed between 1902 and 1905 and dedicated to York Bowen, Dale's piano sonata is a large-scale virtuoso work in just two movements, the second of which combines slow movement, scherzo and finale in a set of variations, a form apparently influenced by Tchaikovsky's Piano Trio. Commentators have discerned various other influences and echoes within this eclectic work, including Liszt's Sonata in B minor, Schumann's Fantasie in C, Balakirev's Islamey, Glazunov's first piano sonata and Wagner's Liebestod. In the opinion of Francis Pott, "the swirling arpeggiation and rich variety of gesture imply an attempted pianistic parallel to Wagnerian and Straussian orchestration, thus carrying the illusion of symphonic transcription to new places". According to Lisa Hardy, author of an extensive survey of British piano sonatas,

"Dale's sonata was the first outstanding British piano sonata. Its harmonic language avoided the clichés of the Beethoven-Brahms style and utilized the resources of Straussian and Wagnerian chromaticism to an unprecedented level. In a sense, however, it marked the end of an era, as this was as far as late romantic harmonies could be taken."

Despite entering the repertoire of concert pianists like York Bowen, Myra Hess, Benno Moiseiwitsch, Irene Scharrer and Moura Lympany, by the 1920s Dale's sonata had fallen out of fashion. In recent years, however, the work has been championed on CD by Peter Jacobs (on Continuum, 1992), Mark Bebbington (SOMM, 2010) and Danny Driver (Hyperion, 2011), contributing to a current revival of interest in Dale's music. It probably remains the single composition for which Dale is best known today.

Dale's next published work was his three movement Suite for Viola and Piano—another sonata in all but name—dating from 1906, the first of a series of compositions written expressly for the violist and RAM professor Lionel Tertis. This ambitious work stretched the boundaries of viola technique at the time and remains challenging even today: Tertis frequently played it either with Bowen at the piano, or in a later arrangement of the last two movements with orchestral accompaniment (first performed in a 1911 Royal Philharmonic Society concert under Arthur Nikisch), which he had encouraged Dale to produce. The Suite was followed by the Phantasy for Viola and Piano (dated 1910) and an Introduction and Andante (1911) for the unusual combination of six independently scored violas, written for performance by Tertis's pupils (one of whom was Eric Coates). A CD of Dale's viola chamber music is available on Dutton Epoch.

By this time, Dale had established himself as a successful composer and teacher, having been appointed Professor of Harmony at the RAM in 1909. In 1912, Henry Wood conducted Dale's Concertstück for organ and orchestra at the Proms, with Frederick Kiddle at the organ in what was probably its last performance to date. Wood was an admirer of Dale's music and described his once popular voices and orchestral setting of Christina Rossetti's Before the Paling of the Stars (composed in 1912) as "a choral gem."

== Later years ==
The outbreak of World War I caught Dale traveling to the Bayreuth Festival on one of his holiday trips to Germany. While being kept under parole in Nuremberg as an enemy alien, Dale wrote three song settings (including two part songs), his first new compositions since 1912. In November, Dale was interned in the civilian internment camp at Ruhleben, near Berlin, along with several other prominent musicians, including fellow composer and RAM professor, Frederick Keel, who was in the same barracks. Dale took part in the activities of the Ruhleben Musical Society, formed in 1915 in the wake of a muddy first winter. In particular, he joined forces with the Canadian Ernest MacMillan (later to become the conductor of the Toronto Symphony Orchestra), who gave lectures on each of the nine symphonies of Beethoven: at the end of each lecture, MacMillan and Dale would perform a four hand piano arrangement of the symphony under discussion. Dale was also one of the musicians who helped MacMillan recreate the score of The Mikado from memory for a full performance in the camp. In 1918, Dale was released early from Ruhleben after breaking his arm, being allowed to stay on a farm in the Netherlands for the duration.

Despite deteriorating health after the war, Dale was able to travel round the world, examining in Australia and New Zealand for the Associated Board of the Royal Schools of Music. He started composing again and became professor of harmony and later Warden at the Royal Academy of Music. He also worked for the BBC's Music Advisory Panel. In the post war period, Dale composed several chamber works for violin (recorded for Dutton Epoch), including a large scale Violin Sonata (1921–22). An anthem, A Song of Praise, followed in 1923. His last major work was the orchestral The Flowing Tide (1943), which has strong elements of Debussian Impressionism combined with Romanticism. In 2002, The Flowing Tide was broadcast complete on BBC Radio 3 with Vernon Handley conducting the BBC Symphony Orchestra in what presumably was the first performance of the work since Adrian Boult conducted its 1943 première. In a detailed review of the event, Christopher Foreman hailed the work as a "major British orchestral masterpiece."

Dale died in July 1943 in London, aged 58, collapsing after having conducted a rehearsal for the première of The Flowing Tide.

== Selected works ==
Orchestral

- Horatius, Overture (1899)
- Overture for orchestra (1900)
- The Tempest, Overture to the Shakespeare play (1902)
- Concertstück (Concert Piece) for organ and orchestra (1904)
- Concert Overture in G minor (1904)
- English Dance for small orchestra (1919); arrangement of original (1916) for string octet, also arranged for violin and piano, Op. 10, No. 1 [see below]
- Prunella for small orchestra (1923); arrangement of original (1916) for violin and piano [see below]
- A Holiday Tune for small orchestra (1925); arrangement of original (1920) for violin and piano [see below]
- The Flowing Tide, Tone Poem (1924–1943)

Chamber

- Piano Trio in D minor – 1st movement only (performed 1902)
- English Dance for 4 violins, 2 violas and 2 cellos (1916); originally intended to introduce Act 3 of Beaumont's The Knight of the Burning Pestle

Violin

- English Dance for violin and piano, Op. 10, No. 1 (1916); originally titled Country Dance
- Prunella for violin and piano, Op. 10, No.2 (1916); originally intended as an Intermezzo for the play of the same name by Laurence Housman and Harley Granville-Barker
- A Holiday Tune for violin and piano, Op. 10, No. 3 (1920)
- Sonata in E major for violin and piano, Op. 11 (1921–1922)
- Ballade in C minor for violin and piano, Op. 15 (1926)

Viola

- Suite in D major for viola and piano, Op. 2 (1906)

1. Maestoso – Allegretto espressivo
2. Romance (also arranged for viola and orchestra, 1909)
3. Finale: Allegro (also viola and orchestra, 1909)

- Phantasy in D minor for viola and piano, Op. 4 (1910)
- Introduction and Andante for 6 violas, Op. 5 (1911, revised 1913)
- English Dance (1916); arrangement for viola and piano by York Bowen; original for violin and piano

Keyboard

- Organ Sonata in D minor (first performed 1902)
- Sonata in D minor for piano, Op. 1 (1902–1905)
- Night Fancies, Impromptu in D♭ major for piano, Op. 3 (1907)
- English Dance for piano (1919); original (1916) for violin and piano
- Prunella for piano (1923); original (1916) for violin and piano

Vocal

- Music, when soft voices die, a song setting in E♭ major for treble voices with piano accompaniment of the poem by Shelley (1914)
- Part-songs, Op. 8[?] (1914)

1. My Garden in A♭, setting of a mystical poem by T.E. Brown
2. Crossing the Bar in F major, setting of the poem by Tennyson

- Two Songs from Shakespeare, Op. 9 (1919); Songs from Shakespeare's Twelfth Night

1. O Mistress Mine in F major for low voice and piano
2. Come Away, Death in D♭ major for low voice, viola and piano

Choral

- Three Christmas Carols, Op. 6 (1911)
- Before the Paling of the Stars for chorus and orchestra, Op. 7 (1912); setting of a Christmas hymn by Christina Rossetti
- A Song of Praise, Festival Anthem for soloists, chorus and orchestra, Op. 12 (1923); words by Reginald Heber; composed for the 269th annual festival of the Sons of the Clergy
- Rosa Mystica, Carol for mixed voices with tenor solo (1925); the words from the Mediaeval anthology collected by Mary Segar

Writing

- Harmony, Counterpoint and Improvisation by Benjamin Dale, Gordon Jacob, Hugo Anson

== Recordings ==
- Complete Music for Violin and Piano: Sonata in E major, Op.11, English Dance, Prunella, Holiday Tune, Ballad, Op.15. Dutton Epoch CDLX7157 (2006)
- Music for Viola and Piano: Suite, Op.2, Phantasy, Op.4, and two piano pieces (Impromptu and Prunella). Etcetera KTC 1105 (1991)
- Music for Viola: Suite, Op.2, Phantasy, Op.4, Introduction & Andante for Six Violas, Op.5, English Dance (arr. York Bowen). Dutton Epoch CDLX7204 (2008)
- Piano Sonata in D minor
  - Mark Bebbington. SOMMCD 097 (2010)
  - Danny Driver. Hyperion CDA67827 (2011) (plus Night Fancies, Prunella and York Bowen's Miniature Suite in C Major, Op. 14)
  - Peter Jacobs. Continuum CCD1044 (1991) (plus Night Fancies and Prunella)
- The Romantic Viola: Suite, Op.2, Phantasy, Op.4, Introduction & Andante for Six Violas, Op.5. Naxos 8.573167 (2013)
