= Hilda Moody =

English singer and actress

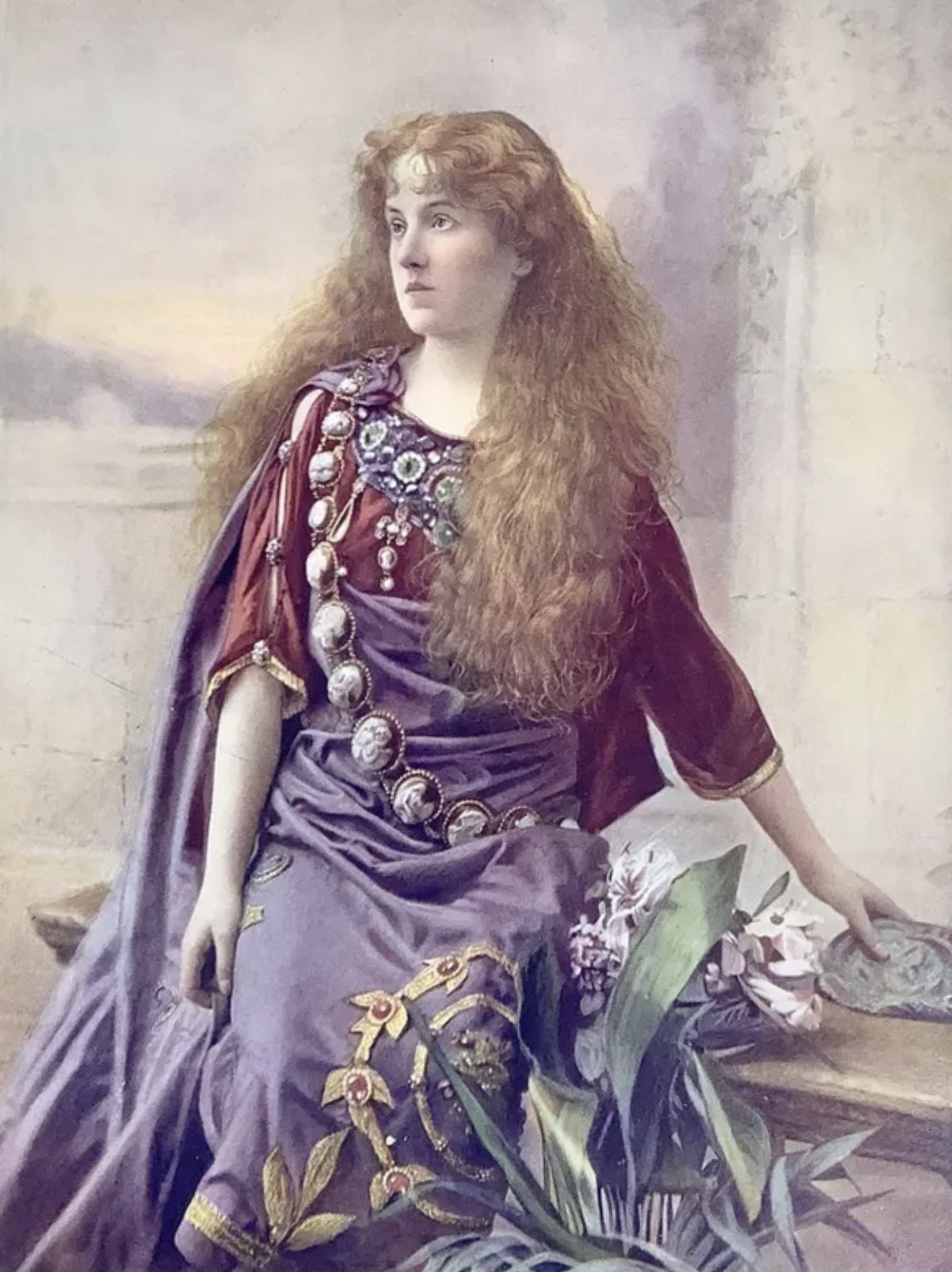
Hilda Moody as Antonia in A Greek Slave (1898)

Hilda Moody (16 June 1876–21 September 1961) was an English singer and actress who, after a brief career in a D'Oyly Carte Opera Company touring company in 1896, appeared as the leading lady in Edwardian musical comedy at Daly's Theatre and the Apollo Theatre in London until 1903. She later appeared with the Moody-Manners Opera Company and continued to perform until at least 1909.

== Early life and career ==
Hilda Moody was born in Redruth in Cornwall in 1876, the youngest of thirteen children of Eliza and James Hawke Moody (1823–1887), a photographer. It was said that her father could play any instrument he had ever seen; her mother Eliza was a pianist, and the whole Moody family were musical. By the age of 13 Moody was already showing musical promise. On 23 December 1886, with other members of her family, she took part in an entertainment at the United Methodist Free Church school room at Stithians, to a large audience. On that occasion she sang 'Darby and Joan' and a duet, 'The broom-girls', with her sister Mabel, which "evoked an unmistakable encore". In 1891 she and Mabel were residential students at Grove House Academy in Baldock in Hertfordshire. Another sister, Fanny, married the singer Charles Manners.

In March 1896 Moody appeared in the British provinces with a D'Oyly Carte Opera Company touring company, playing Lisa in The Grand Duke. Later that year she played The Princess of Monte Carlo in the same piece. In October 1896 Moody toured with the same company as the lead soprano, Princess Zara, in Utopia, Limited. Moody left D'Oyly Carte when her touring company ended its run in November 1896.

== Peak career and later years ==
From 1897 until 1903 Moody made regular appearances in leading roles in the West End, usually in shows produced by George Edwardes, playing O Mimosa San in The Geisha (Daly's Theatre, 1897–98), Antonia in A Greek Slave (Daly's, 1898–99), Rose Brierly in A Gaiety Girl (Daly's, 1899), Poppy in San Toy (Daly's, 1899–1901), Hilda Branscombe in Three Little Maids (Apollo Theatre and Prince of Wales's Theatre, 1902–03), and Barbara in Madame Sherry (Apollo, 1903). On 13 August 1903 in Marylebone she married Joseph Archibald Edward 'Pat' Malone (1863–1929), always billed as J. A. E. Malone; he was George Edwardes' stage director at Daly's. The bride was given away by Akerman May, also of Daly's. Edwardes was among the guests, and the honeymoon was spent in Scotland.

She toured with her sister and brother-in-law's company, the Moody-Manners Opera Company, and returned to London with them in 1907 as Anne Page in The Merry Wives of Windsor and as Musetta in La bohème. She had a "tremendous success" as Alice in The Dollar Princess in Manchester in 1909 before it transferred to London.

Her husband having died in January 1929, later that year she married a mechanical engineer, Charles Harry Leather George (1886–1951), at Guildford Register Office. In 1939 she was living as a housewife with her husband in Malden and Coombe, having shaved four years off her age.

In her later years Hilda George lived in Kennington, near Ashford in Kent. She died in September 1961 at Hothfield Hospital near Ashford. She left an estate valued at £2394 6s.
