= Alasdair Mitchell =

British classical music conductor

- Born: 1950 (age 75–76); Glasgow, Scotland
- Genres: Classical music
- Instrument: Conductor
- Years active: 1974–present
- Label: Chandos Records

Alasdair Mitchell (born 1950) is a Scottish classical music conductor. Born in Glasgow, he studied at the University of Edinburgh, the Royal Academy of Music and the Conservatorio Santa Cecilia in Rome.

Mitchell won second prize at the Nicolai Malko International Conducting Competition in Copenhagen in 1974. He subsequently conducted orchestras in Scandinavia and the United States, and made guest appearances in Britain with the Royal Scottish National Orchestra, BBC Scottish Symphony Orchestra, Ulster Orchestra and Scottish Chamber Orchestra.

Mitchell's recordings for Chandos Records include an album of orchestral works by Ernest Farrar, recorded with the Philharmonia Orchestra in 1996 and released in 1997.

Mitchell has also recorded works by the Scottish composer and educator John Blackwood McEwen, including A Solway Symphony, Hills o' Heather and Where the Wild Thyme Blows. He prepared the performing editions of Hills o' Heather and Where the Wild Thyme Blows used for the recording.

== Discography ==
=== Orchestral recordings ===
Title	Details
McEwen: Three Border Ballads	Released: 1993; Label: Chandos Records; Format: Digital download, CD
McEwen: Solway Symphony • Hills o' Heather • Where the Wild Thyme Blows	Released: 1995; Label: Chandos Records; Format: Digital download, CD
Farrar: Orchestral Music	Released: 1997; Label: Chandos Records; Format: Digital download, CD
McEwen: Hymn on the Morning of Christ's Nativity	Released: 1998; Label: Chandos Records; Format: Digital download, CD
