= Fanny Moody =

British operatic soprano (1866–1945)

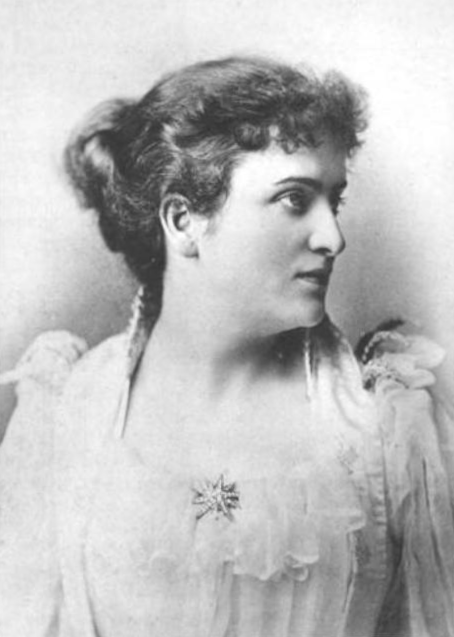
Fanny Moody in 1893

Frances "Fanny" Moody (23 November 1866–21 July 1945) was an operatic soprano of the late Victorian and Edwardian eras, billed as 'The Cornish Nightingale'. In 1898 with her husband, the bass Charles Manners, she formed the Moody-Manners Opera Company, dedicated to presenting opera in English. The Moody-Manners company performed in London, the British provinces, North America and South Africa, with Moody often in the leading soprano roles, from 1898 to 1916.

Moody created leading roles in several operas, including the title roles in Corder's Nordisa (1887) and Pizzi's Rosalba (1902) and Militza in McAlpin's The Cross and the Crescent (1903). In 1892 she appeared at the Olympic Theatre in London as Tatyana in the British premiere of Eugene Onegin, conducted by Henry Wood, with her husband as Gremin.

== Early life ==
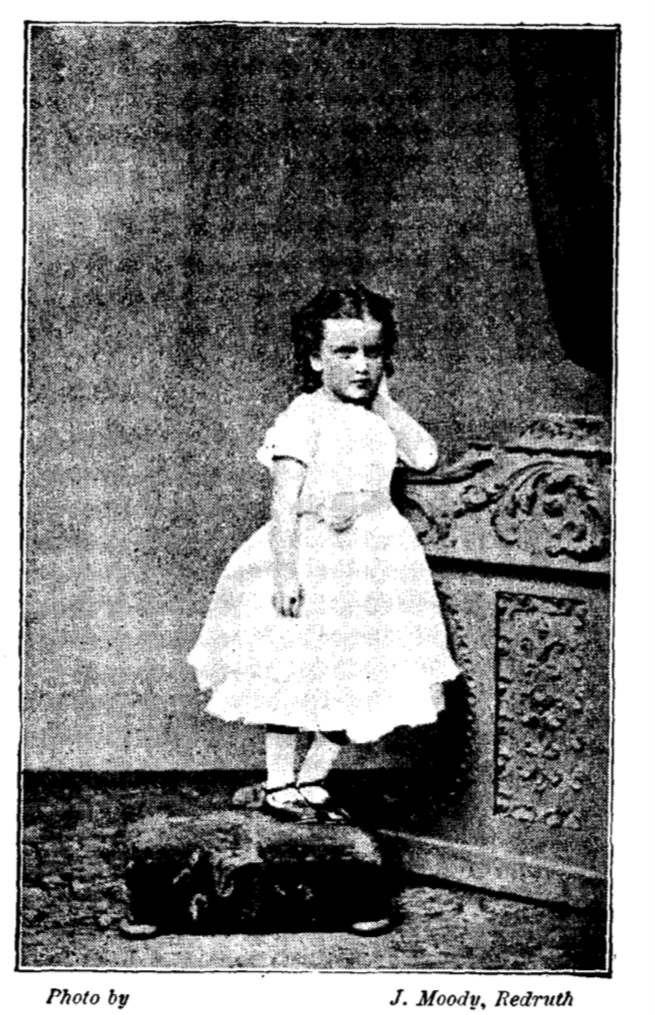
Fanny Moody as a girl – photographed by her father

Frances Moody was born in Redruth, Cornwall, in 1866, one of thirteen children of Eliza and James Hawke Moody (1823–1887), a photographer. In the 1881 Census aged 16 she was listed as an assistant teacher of music to her older sister, Maria. Her youngest sister, Hilda Moody, also had a successful career as a soprano and actress. It was said that her father could play any instrument he had ever seen. Her mother Eliza was a pianist, and the whole Moody family were musical.

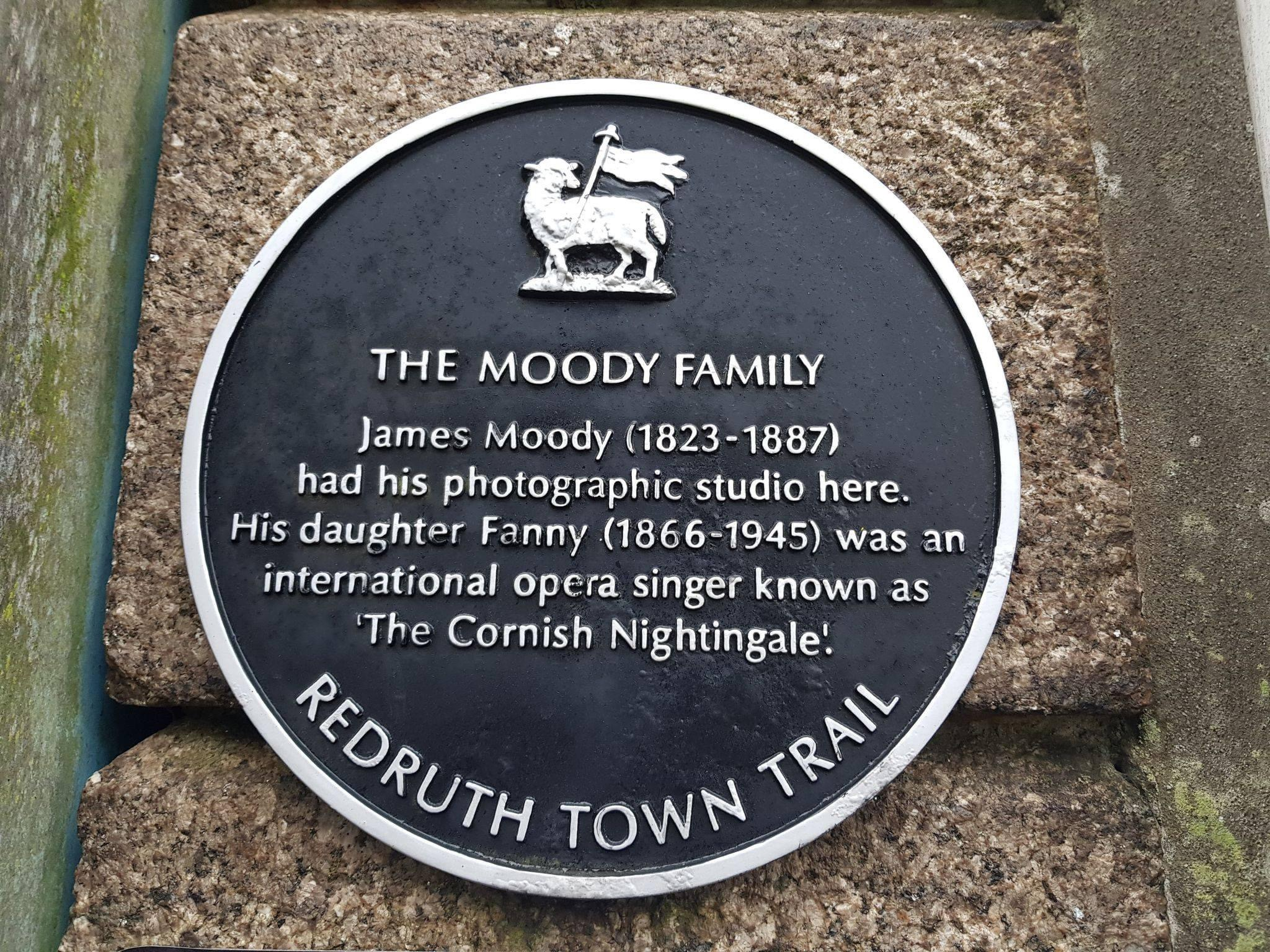
Plaque in Redruth to James Hawke Moody and Fanny Moody

As a young girl Moody sang at several local amateur concerts in her native Redruth, as well as in Penzance and Falmouth. Her talent was spotted by Mrs. Mary Basset of Tehidy, who in 1881 paid for the 17 year-old Moody to train in London with Charlotte Sainton-Dolby (1821–1885). Moody made her London début at the Steinway Hall in June 1883. In April 1884 she sang with other students at a concert in Newcastle. In 1885 she took part in a concert in London given by Prosper Sainton in memory of his wife, at which Moody sang the soprano part of a cantata composed by Madame Sainton-Dolby.

== Singing career ==
Moody began her operatic career with a three-year engagement in the Carl Rosa Opera Company, with which she made her début in Liverpool on 15 January 1887 as Arline in The Bohemian Girl, before appearing in London as Michaela in Bizet's Carmen. In 1890 she sang Marguerite in Gounod's Faust. A fellow member of the company was the bass Charles Manners, and the two married at St George's, Hanover Square, on 5 July 1890 with a full choral service, the Rev. H. R. Haweis and the Rev. W. E. B. Barter officiating. The bride was given away by her old friend, Sir Morell Mackenzie, and a reception was afterwards held at Lady Morell Mackenzie's home.

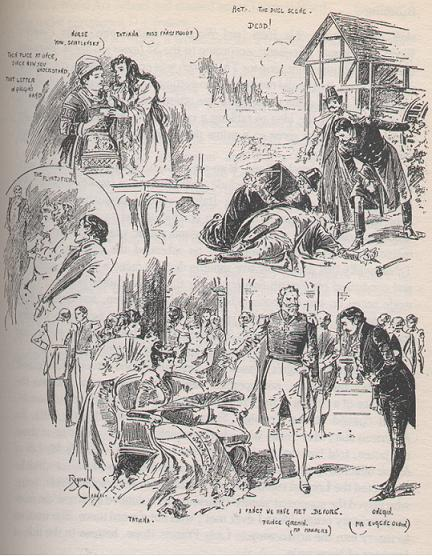
Moody (top left) as Tatyana in the British premiere of Eugene Onegin, illustration from The Graphic, October 1892

Much of her career was spent touring in the British provinces and abroad. Her operatic repertoire included Alice in Meyerbeer's Robert the Devil, and the leading roles in La Juive, Masaniello, Lohengrin, Nordisa (creating the title role) and L'étoile du nord and La traviata, Susanna in The Marriage of Figaro, and Zerlina in Don Giovanni. She performed regularly in oratorio, and her singing at the Lenten series of oratorios given at Covent Garden were greatly admired and applauded. Moody also sang the soprano part in Messiah, The Creation, Judas Maccabaeus, and Stabat Mater, among others. In 1892 she appeared at the Olympic Theatre as Tatyana in the British premiere of Eugene Onegin, conducted by Henry Wood, opposite Eugène Oudin in the title role, with her husband as Gremin. In 1893 she and Manners were engaged to appear with Augustus Harris's opera company. In 1896–97 Moody made a successful and remunerative tour of South Africa with Manners.

== Moody-Manners Opera Company (1898–1916) ==
When the couple returned to England in 1898, they formed the Moody-Manners Opera Company. Manners's ambition was to found a company to give opera in English that would become a permanent national ensemble based in London. With limited capital at their disposal (Manners later stated that they founded the company on £1,700 borrowed from friends, and repaid it all within a year), they began with a provincial tour, starting in Manchester in September 1898. Moody was the company's leading soprano.

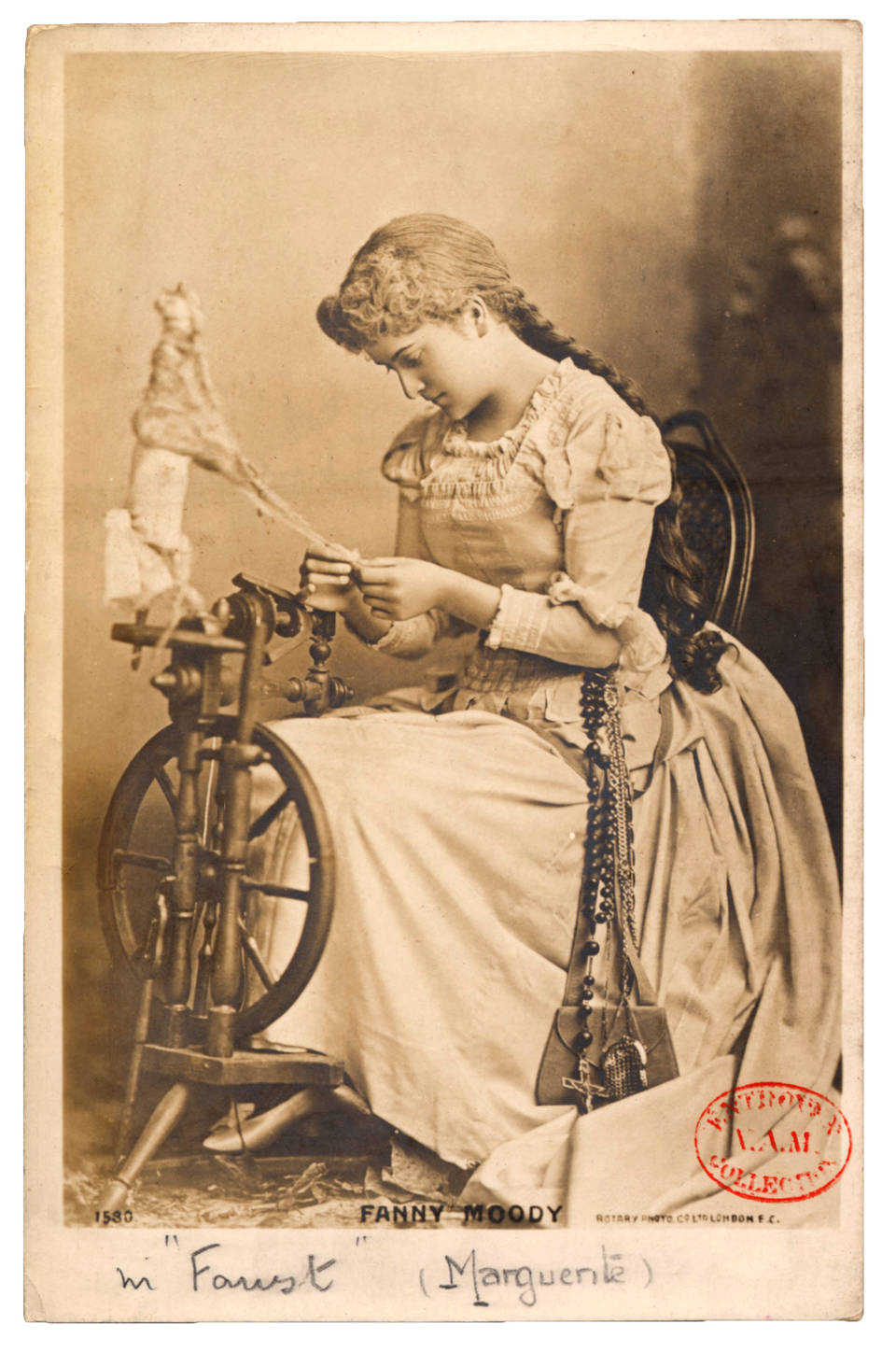
Moody as Marguerite in Faust

By 1902 there were two Moody-Manners touring companies, one with 175 members and the other with 95. The larger of the two gave London seasons in 1902 and 1903 at Covent Garden, in 1904 at the Drury Lane, and in 1907 and 1908 at the Lyric Theatre, when the repertoire included The Merry Wives of Windsor, The Marriage of Figaro, Tannhäuser, Lohengrin, Tristan and Isolde, Faust, Cavalleria rusticana and Pagliacci, Madama Butterfly, Aida and Il trovatore. There were Moody-Manners tours not only of Britain but also of North America and South Africa. In 1911 Moody appeared on the music hall circuit.

By 1910 the company faced financial difficulties and had to disband one of the two companies, and the remaining Moody-Manners Company gave its last performance in May 1916. In its final season, playing to capacity audiences, the company offered Il trovatore, The Bohemian Girl, Martha, Faust, The Lily of Killarney, The Daughter of the Regiment, Carmen, and Eugene Onegin, with Moody in the leading roles.

Moody and Manners retired to Dundrum in County Dublin, where she died in 1945.
