= Alexander Moncrieff, Lord Moncrieff =

Scottish lawyer and judge

The Right Honourable Lord Moncrieff FRSE
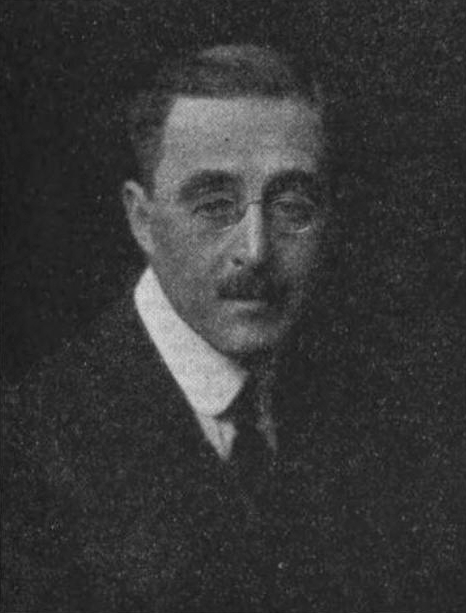

Personal details
- Born: 14 August 1870
- Died: 5 August 1949 (aged 78) Edinburgh, Scotland
- Spouse: Helen McClelland Adams (m. 1913)
- Children: 3, including Margaret Moncrieff
- Relatives: Catriona Kelly (granddaughter)
- Education: University of Edinburgh; University of Glasgow

Alexander Moncrieff, Lord Moncrieff FRSE (14 August 1870 – 5 August 1949), was a Scottish lawyer and judge, who was created a Senator of the College of Justice.

== Life ==
Alexander Moncrieff was the third son Alexander Moncrieff, Advocate and Sheriff of Ross and Cromarty, and Hope Margaret, née Pattison.

Moncrieff studied law at the universities of Glasgow and Edinburgh.

In 1894 Moncrieff was called to the Scottish bar and in 1912 he became a King's Counsel. At this time he was living at 11 Lynedoch Place in Edinburgh's West End.

In January 1926 he was created a Senator of the College of Justice with the title of Lord Moncrieff. He was the judge for the original trial in Donoghue v. Stevenson.

In 1941 he was elected a Fellow of the Royal Society of Edinburgh. His proposers were Thomas Graham Robertson, Lord Robertson, Sir Edmund Taylor Whittaker, John Alexander Inglis and Sir Ernest Wedderburn.

He became Lord Justice Clerk in February 1947, succeeding Lord Cooper, but resigned later that year on the grounds of ill-health. In May 1947, he became a Privy Counsellor.

He died at his home in Edinburgh on 5 August 1949.

== Personal life ==
In 1913, Moncrieff married a widow, Helen Spens (née McClelland Adams). They had three children: Helen Margaret Moncrieff (who went on to become well known as a cellist), Hugh, and Philip.

Moncrieff's daughter, Margaret Moncrieff, married the well-known Scottish pianist Alexander Kelly; and they had two daughters, Catriona Helen Moncrieff Kelly and Alison Mary Moncrieff Kelly. Catriona is Professor of Russian at New College, Oxford; and Alison is a cellist. Alison has two children, Alexander Davan Wetton and Camilla Davan Wetton.
