= Glasgow Grand Opera Society =

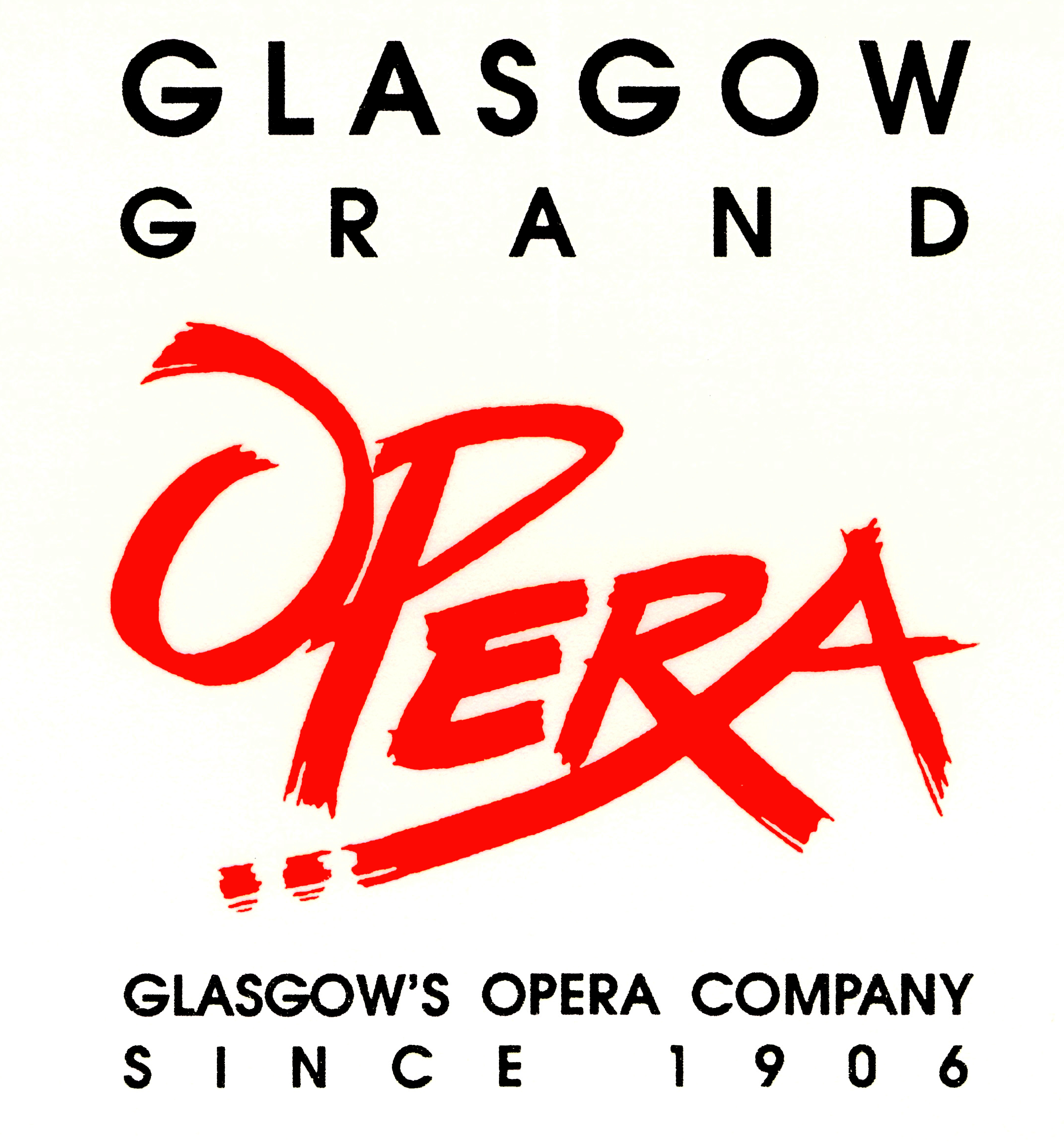
Logo from 1993 - 2000

The Glasgow Grand Opera Society, known by its members and audiences alike as simply 'The Grand', was an opera company based in Glasgow, Scotland. It was founded in 1906 and was wound up in 2000.

Charles Manners used profits from a successful season of his Moody-Manners Opera Company in Glasgow in 1906 to help create the Glasgow Grand Opera Society, under its first conductor R Hutton Malcolm. Its original purpose was to augment touring Grand Opera Companies' choruses, but in 1911 mounted its first independent production, Gounod's Faust.

For all of the 1930s, Erik Chisholm, who had newly founded the Active Society for the Propagation of Contemporary Music, became its musical director and conductor, giving many premieres of opera. 1934 saw the British premiere of Mozart's Idomeneo, for which the scenery and costumes were designed and made by the Glasgow School of Art, which also provided the ballet, and in 1935 Berlioz's huge opera The Trojans was premiered for the first time outside France. Another premiere the next year was Beatrice and Benedict also by Berlioz and translated by the novelist Guy McCrone. Ambitious performances of Aida in 1938 were the last to be led by Chisholm. The war brought an end to much music making of this type and at the end of hostilities Chisholm left for South Africa.

Annual performances of Glasgow Grand resumed in 1946 with Carmen. In 1948 the company presented Eugene Onegin, which was then only rarely performed in Britain. In its Bizet Festival 1951, the Society included The Pearl Fishers, the first time in Britain that the opera had been performed in English. It performed principally in the city's Theatre Royal, followed by the Alhambra and the Kings, usually accompanied by the Royal Scottish National Orchestra. From 1993, its annual productions moved to the New Athenaeum Theatre in the Royal Conservatoire of Scotland where it continued its tradition of breaking new ground with its performance of the Franco Leoni 1905 opera L'Oracolo in 1994, a Scottish premiere and the first production of that opera in the United Kingdom for 80 years. Wynne Evans, then a 4th year student at the Guildhall School of Music and Drama, played San-Lui, the Oracle's son. The company's producers included Peter Ebert, Anthony Besch and Jack Notman.

Although challenged from the early 1960s by the professional Scottish Opera, established by Sir Alexander Gibson, (who had conducted the Society in 1954), the company continued to produce major annual productions until 1999.

== Selected production history ==
Year	Productions
1911	Faust
1934	Idomeneo, The Bartered Bride
1935	The Trojans
1936	Beatrice and Benedict, Benvenuto Cellini, The Faithful Warrior (Schubert)
