= John Blackwood McEwen =

Scottish classical composer

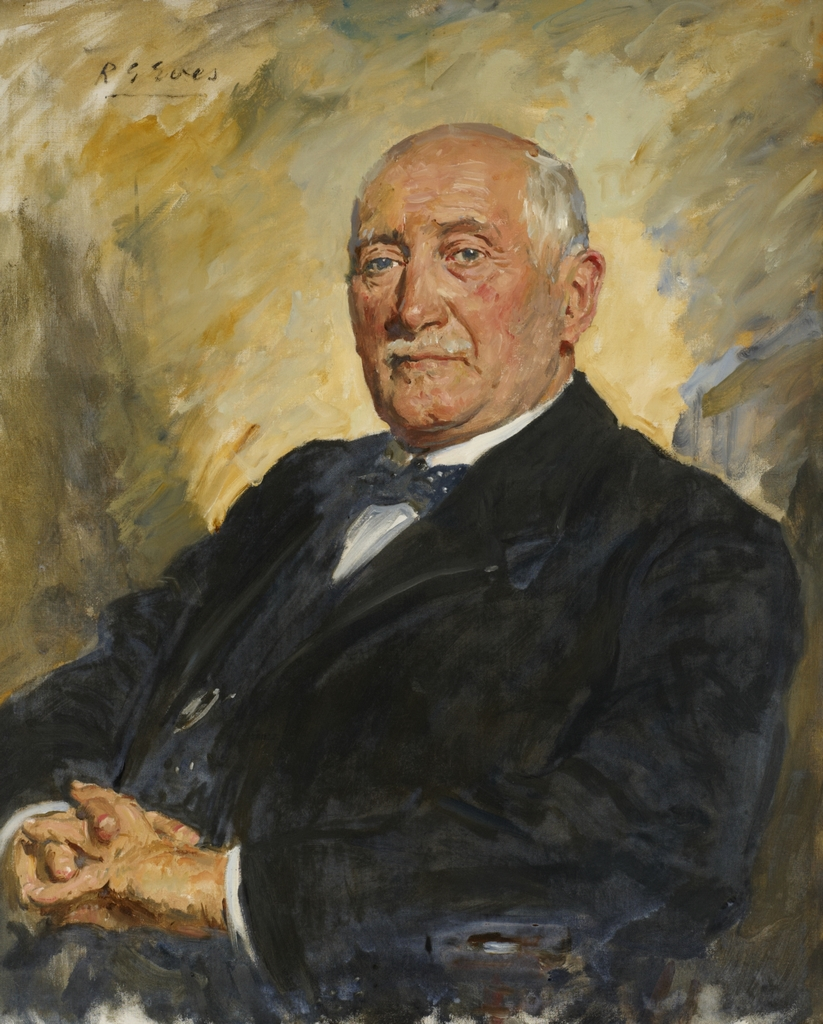
Painting by Reginald Eves, 1937

Sir John Blackwood McEwen (13 April 1868 – 14 June 1948) was a Scottish classical composer and educator. He was professor of harmony and composition at the Royal Academy of Music, London, from 1898 to 1924, and principal from 1924 to 1936. He was a prolific composer, but made few efforts to bring his music to the notice of the general public.

== Life and career ==
=== Early years ===
John Blackwood McEwen was born in Hawick in 1868, the son of James McEwen and his first wife, Jane, née Blackwood. James McEwen was a Presbyterian minister; he moved to a church in Glasgow, where his son grew up. McEwen gained an MA degree from Glasgow University in 1888, between then and 1891 he studied music while working as a choirmaster, first in Glasgow and later at Lanark parish church. In 1891 he moved to London to gain wider musical experience, and by 1893 he had composed two string quartets, three symphonies, a Mass and other works. In that year he entered the Royal Academy of Music (RAM), where he studied with Ebenezer Prout, Frederick Corder and Tobias Matthay.

While a student at the RAM McEwen won the Charles Lucas medal, and had his First String Quartet played at one of the academy's concerts. Two years later he returned to Scotland, as a teacher of piano and composition at the Athenaeum School of Music (later the Royal Scottish Academy of Music) and choirmaster of South parish church, Greenock.

=== Professor and principal ===
In 1898 McEwen accepted an invitation from Sir Alexander Mackenzie, principal of the RAM, to become professor of harmony and composition. He held the post for the next 26 years. Among his students were the composers William Alwyn, Dorothy Howell and Priaulx Rainier. He was known as an exacting teacher, who emphasised discipline, but encouraged a liberal aesthetic outlook in his pupils.

In 1902 McEwen married the pianist Hedwig Ethel Cole (1879–1949), daughter of Henry Alwyn Bevan Cole, naval architect. There were no children of the marriage. In 1905, together with Frederick Corder and Tobias Matthay, McEwen co-founded the Society of British Composers; he also served as president of Incorporated Society of Musicians He held radically egalitarian political views, and wrote a series of left-wing tracts, including Abolish Money and Total Democracy.

In 1924, on Mackenzie's retirement, McEwen was appointed principal of the RAM. The Manchester Guardian said of his tenure that although he did not go out of his way to seek popularity among his students and staff, "his unfailing loyalty and integrity won him the respect of all those who came into touch with him". In 1926 he received the honorary degree of DMus from Oxford University. He was knighted in the 1931 New Year Honours, and retired in 1936.

McEwen died in 1948 in London, aged 80. His widow died the following year. He bequeathed the residue of his estate to the University of Glasgow to help promote the performance of chamber music by composers of Scottish birth and descent.

== Music ==
McEwen's biographer Jeremy Dibble writes that the composer's orchestral music shows an indebtedness "to the highly coloured, post-Wagnerian palette of Strauss, Skryabin, and the late French Romantics such as Chausson, Dukas, and Charpentier … a late-Romantic propensity that even extended to 'Sprechgesang' in the Fourteen Poems for 'inflected voice' and piano (1943)." Dibble comments that McEwen's large output of chamber music "reveals a creative mind disposed towards more abstract, polyphonic thought." Bernard Benoliel, in Grove's Dictionary of Music and Musicians observes that McEwen's music "synthesizes Scottish (and sometimes French) folk idioms and the Romantic legacy of Berlioz, Liszt, Wagner, and the French and Russian schools; Debussy was particularly influential".

Dibble writes that In the Three Border Ballads (1905–8) the composer's "mastery of form and orchestration, backed by a powerful emotional impetus, rivals mature Elgar". McEwen's best-known orchestral work was the Solway Symphony of 1922; it was the first British symphony to be recorded for the gramophone. He wrote a Viola Concerto for Lionel Tertis, described by The Times after its premiere in 1901 as "interesting and very well written". The consensus of critics is that McEwen's finest works are his chamber compositions.

McEwen's music achieved little public recognition, partly because he rarely sought it. Dibble remarks that he was "seemingly unconcerned about the dissemination of his own works". Despite that, McEwen nevertheless did much to further the cause of other British composers, particularly as a prominent member of the Royal Philharmonic Society in the years between the First and Second World Wars.

In recent years Chandos Records has revived many of McEwen's works, issuing three CDs of large-scale pieces conducted by Alasdair Mitchell including A Solway Symphony, Hills o`Heather for Cello and Orchestra, Where the Wild Thyme Blows, Three Border Ballads, and Hymn on the Morning of Christ's Nativity; three more CDs of McEwen's string quartets; and a single CD of solo piano music, including the large scale Piano Sonata of 1903. In 2025 the Berkeley Ensemble issued the first complete recording of Nugae, seven Bagatelles for string quartet.

McEwen wrote two musical text-books: Exercises on Phrasing in Pianoforte Playing, and The Principles of Phrasing and Articulation in Music . The Musical Times considered that his chief literary contribution was The Thought in Music: An Inquiry into the Principles of Musical Rhythm, Phrasing and Expression.

== Selected works ==
Stage

- The Royal Rebel, Comic Opera in 3 acts (1909)

Orchestral

- Comala, Symphonic Poem (1889)
- Lanark, Overture (1890)
- Suite in E major (1893)
- Suite in F (1893)
- Overture to a Comedy (1895)
- Symphony in A minor (1892–1898); published as String Quartet in 1903
- Three Border Ballads (1906–1908)

1. Coronach (1906)
2. The Demon Lover (1906–1907)
3. Grey Galloway (1908)

- Solway, Symphony No. 5 in C♯ minor (1911)
- The Jocund Dance, Dance Tunes for string orchestra (1920, orchestrated 1927); original for string quartet
- Suite of Old National Dances for string orchestra (1924); also for string quartet
- Prelude (1925)
- Where the Wild Thyme Blows, Prelude (1936)
- Overture di ballo for chamber orchestra (1936)
- Suite for string orchestra (1936)

1. Prelude
2. What the Cello Said
3. Der kleine Meister (The Little Masters)
4. Orientale
5. Scherzo

- Suite in C major for string orchestra (1941)
- Suite in D major for string orchestra (1941)
- Suite Ballet de Lilliput for string orchestra and harp

Concertante

- Concerto for viola and orchestra (1901)
- Hills o'Heather, a Retrospect for cello and orchestra (1918)
- Prince Charlie, a Scottish Rhapsody for violin and orchestra (1924, orchestrated 1941); original for violin and piano

Chamber music

- String Quartet in F major (1893)
- String Quartet in F minor (1893)
- String Quartet No. 1 in F (1893)
- String Quartet No. 2 in A minor (1898), arrangement of Symphony in A minor; published in 1903
- Graih My Chree, Recitation Music for 2 violins, viola, cello, piano and percussion (1900)
- String Quartet No. 3 in E minor (1901)
- 6 Highlands Dances for violin and piano (1902)
- String Quartet No. 4 in C minor (1905)
- String Quintet "Phantasy-Quintet" in E minor (1911)
- "Nugae", 7 Bagatelles (String Quartet No. 5) for 2 violins, viola and cello (1912)

1. Lament in G minor
2. March of the Little Folk in E♭ major
3. Peat Reek in G minor
4. Scherzino in G minor
5. Humoresque in A
6. The Dhu Loch in D
7. Red Murdoch in G minor

- String Quartet No. 6 "Biscay" in A major (1913); published as No. 8

1. Le phare (The Lighthouse)
2. Les dunes (The Dunes)
3. La racleuse (The Oyster-Raker)

- Sonata No. 1 in E♭ major for violin and piano (1913)
- Sonata No. 2 in F minor for violin and piano (1913–1914)
- 2 Poems for violin and piano (1913)

1. Breath o'June; also for viola and piano
2. The Lone Shore

- Sonata No. 3 in G for violin and piano (1913)
- String Quartet No. 7 "Threnody" (1916); published as No. 9
- A Little Sonata (Sonata No. 4) in A major for violin and piano (1917)
- String Quartet No. 8 in E♭ major (1918)
- String Quartet No. 9 in B minor (1920)
- The Jocund Dance, Dance Tunes (String Quartet No. 10) for 2 violins, viola and cello (1920); also for string orchestra
- Martinmas Tide in G minor for violin and piano (1921)
- Sonata No. 5 Sonata-Fantasia for violin and piano (1921)
- String Quartet No. 11 in E minor (1921)
- Prince Charlie, a Scottish Rhapsody for violin and piano (1924); also for violin and orchestra
- Suite of Old National Dances, String Quartet No. 12 (1924); original version for string orchestra
- String Quartet No. 13 in C minor (1928)
- Sonata No. 6 for violin and piano (1929)
- String Quartet No. 14 in D minor (1936)
- A Little Quartet: In modo Scotico, String Quartet No. 15 (1936)
- String Quartet No. 16 "Quartette provençale" (1936)
- Piano Trio No. 2 in A minor (1937); after the 1936 Prelude Where the Wild Thyme Blows for orchestra
- Improvisations provençales for violin and piano (1937)
- 5 Preludes and a Fugue for 2 violins (1939); version for violin and viola (1942)
- Under Northern Skies for flute, oboe, clarinet, horn and bassoon (1939)
- Sonata No. 7 in A minor for violin or viola and piano (1941)
- Pericula, 6 trios avec piano (1943)
- Piano Trio No. 3 "Rococo" (1943)
- Piano Trio No. 4 "Fantasy" (1943)
- Pericula (Experiments), 6 String Trios for violin, viola and cello (1943)
- Pibroch for 2 violins, viola and cello (1943); arrangement of movement III of String Trio No. 2
- String Quartet No. 17 "Fantasia" in E major (1947)
- 2 Duos for oboe and piano
- Romance for Violin
- 5 Scottish Dances for violin and piano

Organ

- Festive March
- March

Piano

- Sonata in E minor (1903)
- 4 Sketches (1909)

1. Prelude
2. Quasi minuetto
3. Elegy
4. Humoreske

- Suite de ballet for piano 4-hands (1912)
- Vignettes from La Côte d'Argent (1918)

1. Petite Chérie (Little Darling)
2. Les Hirondelles (The Swallows)
3. Pantalon rouge (Red Trousers)
4. Crépuscule du soir mystique (Mystical Twilight)
5. La Rosière (The Motorboat)

- Sonatina in G minor (1918)
- 3 Preludes (1920)

1. A White Naiad in a Rippling Stream
2. A Rapt Seraph in a Moonlight Beam
3. The Dew by Fairy Feet Swept from the Green

- On Southern Hills, 3 Sketches from Provençe (1938)

1. White Oxen
2. Drifting Clouds
3. L'improvisadou (The Improvisatore)

- Ballet Suite (1938)

1. La Senorita
2. Intermezzo
3. Valsette
4. Alla Marcia

- Allemande
- Phyllis Hallain's Book
- Sonatina in C
- A Winter Poem

Vocal

- The River for voice and piano (1899); words by Moore Park
- The Vale of Glenariff for voice and piano (1899); words by Thomas McEwen
- Brevity for voice and piano (1905); words by Constance Travers
- Here's a Flower for Your Grave for voice and piano (1905); words by Justin Huntly McCarthy
- Love's But a Dance for voice and piano (1905); words by Henry Austin Dobson
- A Roundel of Rest for voice and piano (1905); words by Arthur Symons
- 3 Songs for voice and piano (1906); words by Paul Verlaine in translation by A. Wingate

1. Song of Autumn
2. The Wood's Aglow
3. Soleils couchants

- Sleep, Little Blossom for voice and piano (1909); words by Alfred, Lord Tennyson
- The Gauger for voice and piano (1911); words by J. Meade Falkner
- 14 Poems for inflected voice and piano (1943); words by Margaret Forbes
- Day by Day for voice and piano
- England, My England for voice and orchestra; words by William Ernest Henley
- Love's Remembrance for voice and piano
- The Birds Lullaby for voice and piano; words by Pauline Johnson

Choral

- The Vision of Jacob, Sacred Cantata for tenor, mixed chorus and orchestra (1892); words by Thomas McEwen
- A Scene from Hellas for female chorus and orchestra (1895, revised 1947); words by Percy Bysshe Shelley
- A Day in Spring, Cantata for female chorus and piano (1898); words by Thomas McEwen
- Evening, Two-Part Song for female chorus and piano (1898)
- The Last Chantey for chorus and orchestra (1898); words by Rudyard Kipling
- Morning Greeting, Two-Part Song for female voices (1898)
- Slumber Song, Two-Part Song for female chorus and piano (1898)
- Weep No More, Four-Part Song for mixed chorus and piano (1902); words by John Fletcher
- Charm Me Asleep, Four-Part Song (1903); words by Robert Herrick
- Let Me the Canakin Clink, Four-Part Song (1903); words from Othello by William Shakespeare
- O That Men Would Praise the Lord, Anthem for Harvest (1903)
- Hymn on the Morning of Christ's Nativity, Ode for soprano, chorus and orchestra (1905); words from On the Morning of Christ's Nativity by John Milton
- Troll the Bowl, Four-Part Song for mixed chorus and piano (1905); words by Thomas Dekker
- Allen-a-Dale, Four-Part Song for mixed chorus and piano (1907); words by Sir Walter Scott
- The Links o' Love, Part-Song for mixed chorus and piano (1909); words by Andrew Wanless
- Three Scenes from the Empire Pageant at the Cristal Palace, 1910 for chorus and wind orchestra (1909)
- The Wind in the Chimney, Part Song (1911); words by Bret Harte
- Autumn Song, Two-Part Song for female chorus and piano (1912)
- The Garland for mixed chorus and piano
- Psalm 24: Chorus and "Lift Up Your Hearts" for mixed chorus a cappella
- 6 Two-Part Songs for female voices and piano
- When through the Piazzetta for mixed chorus a cappella

Literary

- Exercises on Phrasing in Pianoforte Playing (1908)
- A Text-Book of Harmony and Counterpoint (1908)
- A Primer of Harmony for Use in Schools (1911)
- The Thought in Music: An Enquiry into the Principles of Musical Rhythm, Phrasing and Expression (1912)
- The Principles of Phrasing and Articulation in Music (1916)
- The Foundations of Musical Aesthetics, or the Elements of Music (1917)
- First Steps in Musical Composition (1922)
- Tempo Rubato, or Time-Variation in Musical Performance (1928)
- An Introduction to an Unpublished Edition of the Pianoforte Sonatas of Beethoven (1932)
