= Peter Jacobs (pianist) =

English pianist (born 1945)

Peter Jacobs (born 17 August 1945) is an English pianist.

Jacobs was born in London and studied at the Royal Academy of Music in London with Alexander Kelly (piano) and Eric Fenby (harmony). For a while he was Director of Music at Taunton School, but returned to London to begin his career as a concert pianist, examiner and adjudicator. His initial public performances were in chamber groups, and as part of a pianist duo with Elizabeth Lightoller before making his solo debut at the Wigmore Hall on 9 May 1975 with a programme of little-known 20th century composers.

He has continued to concentrate on out-of-the-way (particularly English and French) repertoire of the late 19th and 20th centuries throughout his subsequent career, playing works by such figures as Henry Balfour Gardiner, Alan Bush, Benjamin Dale, John Foulds, Trevor Hold, Billy Mayerl, Betty Roe, Harold Truscott and Percy Turnbull. He also performed the sometimes neglected piano works of more mainstream figures such as Frank Bridge and Vaughan Williams. One of his first recordings in 1987 was The Lake in the Mountains, including the complete piano music of Vaughan Williams. In the early 1990s Jacobs began recording for the then new Hyperion label, beginning with the complete solo piano music of Cécile Chaminade. In 1996 he released the first complete recording of Charles Villiers Stanford's neglected 24 Preludes, Set 1, op. 163, following up a year later with a recording of Set 2, op 179.

Although many of his recordings have become unavailable over the years, in 2020 Heritage Records released two box sets of reissues under the British Piano Collection banner. His recordings of ten of Harold Truscott's Piano Sonatas was reissued in 2021. Jacobs returned to the studio in 2020 to record additional works by Trevor Hold, and again in 2021 and 2024/5 to perform sequences of British piano music from his repertoire hitherto unrecorded.

Jacobs is an Associated Board examiner. He has compiled three volumes of British music for Thames Publishing. He has also served as head of keyboard at Latymer Upper School in Hammersmith, taking courses in the music of Schubert, Chopin and Mendelssohn.
