= Paul Corder =

English composer and music professor

Paul Walford Corder (14 December 1879 - 6 August 1942) was an English composer and music professor.

Corder was born at Pimlico, London, the son of musician Frederick Corder and his wife Henrietta Walford. He was baptised at St Gabriel's, Warwick Square, London, on 1 March 1880. He studied under his father at the Royal Academy of Music and won the Goring Thomas scholarship for composition in 1901. In 1907 he joined the staff of the Academy as Professor of Composition and Harmony.

His aunt Rosa Corder painted a portrait of Dante Gabriel Rossetti and Corder was strongly influenced by the Pre-Raphaelite movement. He composed operas, ballets, cantatas and piano works. Many of his orchestral works remain unpublished and unknown but some of his keyboard pieces were published and achieved some public attention. He was a close friend of Arnold Bax with whom he spent holidays in Cornwall. Bax dedicated the song "Aspiration" (1909) and his Fourth Symphony (1931) to Corder.

Paul and his sister Dolly moved to Looe Island, Cornwall in 1921, the island being bought with the proceeds of the sale of Frederick Corder's collection of first editions. It is said that Dolly was so distraught at Paul's death in 1942 that she destroyed many of his musical manuscripts.

From 1932 Corder lived for many years at White Cottage, Netley Heath, Surrey, with his sister Dolly. One of his hobbies was furniture-making.

== Works ==
- Rapunzel, Opera
- Grettir the Strong, Opera
- The Dryad, Ballet
- A Song of Battle for choir and orchestra
- A Song of the Ford for male choir and orchestra
- Four Sea Songs for baritone and orchestra
- The Moonslave, a terpsichorean fantasy
- A Song of the Bottle
- Spanish Waters
- Sunset and Sunrise
- Pelleas and Melisande
- Cyrano de Bergerac, overture
- Gaelic Fantasy
- Morar
- Dross, Music drama without words
- Violin concerto
- Five Orchestral Tone Pictures: : Along the Seashore: 1. The Ebbing Tide; 2. The Sea Cavern; 3. Seagull's Rock; 4. The still hour of dusk; 5. The Call of the Sea
- String quartet
- Fountains for viola and piano
- Transmutations of an Original Theme for piano
- Nine Preludes for piano
- Three Studies
- Passacaglia
- Romantic Study
- Heroic Elegy
- Spanish Waters
- An Autumn Memory
