= Phyllis Matthewman =

British writer

Phyllis Matthewman (née Barton) (19 January 1896 – 1979), was a British writer of children's books, mostly boarding school stories, and adult fiction.

== Personal life ==
Matthewman was born in Leeds, the elder daughter of Thomas Barton, an insurance manager, and Ada Mary (née Pollard). She had a sister, Joyce. In 1930 she married Sydney Matthewman, a literary agent, who ran (or whose father ran) the Swan Press in Leeds. They had no children. In 1964, her long-time friend Elinor Brent-Dyer left the large Victorian villa at which she had previously run a school in order to live with the Matthewmans, which she did until her death in 1969. After first renting half of a house called Albury Edge at Redhill, Surrey, they bought a house together, Gryphons, also at Redhill, in 1965. Phyllis's aunt, who knew the Dyer family, had introduced them in childhood. Sydney Matthewman served as Brent-Dyer's agent.

Matthewman also published under the names Kathryn Surrey and Jacqueline Yorke.

== Selected books ==
=== Daneswood series ===
- Chloe Takes Control, 1940
- The Queerness of Rusty, 1941
- Josie Moves Up, 1943
- A New Role for Natasha, 1945
- Justice for Jacqueline, 1946
- Pat at the Helm, 1947
- The Intrusion of Nicola, 1948

=== Kirkdale Priory series ===
- Because of Vivian, 1947
- The Turbulence of Tony, 1951
- The Coming of Lys, 1951
- The Amateur Prefects, 1951

=== The 'Mr. Jones' books ===
- Thanks to Mr. Jones, 1948
- Peter-New Girl, 1948
- Mr. Jones Tips the Scales, 1950
- Peter Plays the Sleuth, 1950

=== Other children's books ===
- Jill on the Land (1942)
- Clubs are Trumps (1946, The Lutterworth Press)
- Amanda at the Manor (1954, Oliphants)
- John Williams, biography of John Williams (missionary), (1954, Oliphants)
- The Mystery of Snake Island (1962, University of London Press)
- No Magic Carpet (1966, EJ Arnold)

=== Adult romance fiction ===
- Set to Partners (1944, Mills & Boon)
- Utility Wedding (1946, Mills & Boon)
- Stable Companions (1947, Mills & Boon)
- How Could You, Jennifer! (1948, Mills & Boon)
- River of Enchantment (1948, Mills & Boon)
- As Kathryn Surrey, Maids A-Waiting (1948, Comyns)
- Colour of Romance (1949, Mills & Boon)
- The Veil Between (1950, Mills & Boon)
- The Imprudence of Prue (1951, Mills & Boon)
- Winged Cupid, (1951, Mills & Boon)
- Clutch of Circumstance (1952, Mills & Boon)
- Imitation Marriage (1952, Mills & Boon)
- Castle to Let (1953, Mills & Boon)
- Welcome Enemy (1953, Mills & Boon)
- Luck for Lindy (1954, Mills & Boon)
- Sir, she Said (1954, Mills & Boon)
- The Beckoning House (1955, Mills & Boon)
- Beginners, Please (1955, Mills & Boon)
- Fetters of a Dream (1956, Mills & Boon)
- Romance Goes Tenting (1956, Mills & Boon)
- Safari with Wings (1957, Mills & Boon)
- Cupid in Mayfair (1958, Mills & Boon)
- Wife on Approval (1958, Mills & Boon)
- Food of Love (1959, Mills & Boon)
- Ace of Hearts (1960, Mills & Boon)
- Call Me Cousin (1960, Mills & Boon)
- Cupid Under Capricorn (1961, Mills & Boon)
- Maiden's Castle (1962, Mills & Boon)
- Voyage into Happiness (1962, Mills & Boon)
- Ward of Court (1963, Mills & Boon)
- A Brother for Jane (1964, Mills & Boon)
- Make Up Your Mind, Nurse (1964, Mills & Boon)
- The Wonderful Year (1964, Mills & Boon)
- Bolt of Cupid, (1965, Mills & Boon)
- The Heart is Highland (1965, Mills & Boon)
- Tread Warily (1966, Mills & Boon)
- The Magic of the Moon (1967, Mills & Boon)
- The Time for Loving (1972, Mills & Boon, republished in the Woman's Weekly Library, 1974)

=== Adult thrillers ===
- Brides of the Devil (1946), published under the name Jacqueline Yorke
