= Margaret Moncrieff =

Scottish cellist and author

- Born: Helen Margaret Moncrieff; 6 February 1921; Edinburgh, Scotland
- Died: 12 November 2008 (aged 87)
- Education: Royal College of Music
- Occupations: Cellist, teacher, writer
- Spouse: Alexander Kelly (m. 1957; died 1996)
- Children: 2, including Catriona Kelly
- Relatives: Alexander Moncrieff, Lord Moncrieff (father); Helen McClelland Adams (mother)
- Writing career
- Pen name: Helen McClelland

Helen Margaret Moncrieff (6 February 1921 – 12 November 2008) was a Scottish cellist and, as Helen McClelland, the writer of a biography of Elinor Brent-Dyer and of novels in the Chalet School series.

== Early life ==
Helen Margaret Moncrieff was born in 1921 in Edinburgh, Scotland, daughter of Alexander Moncrieff, Lord Moncrieff, and Helen, née McClelland Adams, formerly Spens.

In London, Moncrieff studied the cello at the Royal College of Music with Ivor James, and then in Paris, with Pierre Fournier. She went on to a career as a soloist, chamber musician, and teacher.

== Career ==
Moncrieff was a professor of cello at the Royal College of Music.

In 1981, she published Behind the Chalet School: A Biography of Elinor M. Brent-Dyer. This was republished in 1996 by Bettany Press. She wrote two "fill-in" novels about the Chalet School and its characters. She wrote in Behind the Chalet School that her novel Visitors for the Chalet School (1995) "became the subject of six radio interviews within the space of barely ten days, as well as being given an excellent review in the Independent on Sunday".

In 2003, Moncrieff published an autobiographical account, Worlds Apart.

== Personal life ==
In 1957, Moncrieff married Alexander Kelly (1929–1996) a pianist, composer, and later head of keyboard studies at the Royal Academy of Music. They had two children: cellist Alison Moncrieff Kelly, and Catriona Kelly, Professor of Russian at New College, Oxford.

== Works ==
- 2001: Time and Again, a time slip novel
- 2003: Worlds Apart: Memoirs of Margaret Moncrieff Kelly

=== Chalet School ===
Montcrieff's entries in the series include:

- Joey and Patricia: A Reunion in Guernsey (2000)
- Visitors to the Chalet School (2004)
