= Society of British Composers =

The Society of British Composers was founded in 1905 to protect the interests of British composers and to provide publication, promotion and performance opportunities. The organization was disbanded in 1918.

== History ==
In the late 1800s and early 1900s, a number of talented composers were graduating from the Royal Academy of Music without any avenue for publication and performance of their work. The problem came to a head with the Piano Sonata in D Minor produced by the young composer Benjamin Dale. The sonata was sixty pages long, leading to problems with commercial publication, and the Society of British Composers was founded by Frederick Corder, John Blackwood McEwen, Tobias Matthay and others at the Royal Academy of Music to address that and similar problems. The society published the sonata in its first yearbook through its imprint Charles Avison, Ltd.

Frederick Corder served as the first chairman, and the society followed a publication plan which provided a selection of compositions for use in performance. Publication was made under the imprint of Charles Avison, Ltd. through Breitkopf & Härtel, which was later changed to Cary and then to Novello & Co.

The society was founded without women members, but by 1914 women composers were allowed to join.
