= Catriona Kelly =

British academic specialising in Russian culture

Catriona Kelly FBA
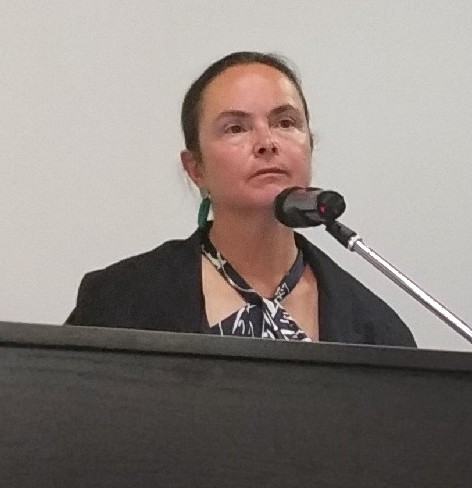
- Professor Kelly in 2019
- Born: Catriona Helen Moncrieff; 6 October 1959 (age 66)
- Occupations: Historian, academic, writer
- Parent(s): Alexander Kelly; Margaret Moncrieff
- Relatives: Alexander Moncrieff, Lord Moncrieff (maternal grandfather)

Catriona Helen Moncrieff Kelly, FBA (born 6 October 1959) is a British academic specialising in Russian culture. From 1996 to 2021, she was Professor of Russian at the University of Oxford and a Fellow of New College. In 2021, she was elected senior research fellow of Trinity College, Cambridge and honorary professor of the University of Cambridge.

Catriona Kelly was brought up in London. Her parents were pianist Alexander Kelly and cellist Margaret Moncrieff. Her sister is the cellist Alison Moncrieff-Kelly and she is married to neuroscientist Professor Ian Thompson. Her grandfather was Alexander Moncrieff and Hope Mirlees was her mother's first cousin. She was educated at the school in London run by the Congregation of Our Lady of Sion (1969–1970) and at Godolphin and Latymer School (1970–1977). After spending six months living in Vienna, she read Russian and German at the University of Oxford, including a year (1980–1981) as a visiting student at Voronezh State University, USSR, sponsored by the British Council. She went on to complete a doctorate on the Russian poet Innokenty Annensky at Oxford (1985).

She was a senior scholar and junior research fellow at Christ Church, Oxford (1983–1993) and then lecturer in Russian at the School of Slavonic and East European Studies (1993–1996), before taking up her position at the University of Oxford and New College.

Kelly is the author of many books about Russian history and culture, including Petrushka, the Russian Carnival Puppet Theatre (Cambridge University Press, 1990), A History of Russian Women's Writing (Oxford University Press, 1994), Refining Russia: Advice Literature, Polite Culture, and Gender from Catherine to Yeltsin (Oxford University Press, 2001), Russian Literature, A Very Short Introduction (Oxford University Press, 2001), Comrade Pavlik: The Rise and Fall of a Soviet Boy Hero (Granta Books, 2005/Moscow, 2009), a study of the boy hero Pavlik Morozov, St Petersburg: Shadows of the Past (Yale University Press, 2014), Socialist Churches: Radical Secularization and the Preservation of the Past in Petrograd and Leningrad, 1918-1988, Soviet Art House: Lenfilm Studio under Brezhnev (Oxford University Press, 2021), and articles for professional journals and for the general press. She is the editor of Utopias: Russian Modernism, 1905-1940 (Penguin, 1999) and (with Stephen Lovell) of Russian Modernism and the Visual Arts (Cambridge University Press, 2000). In 2015, Catriona Kelly was president of the Association for Slavic, East European, and Eurasian Studies, the first person working at a university outside the United States to be appointed to this position.
