= Nordisa =

1887 opera by Frederick Corder

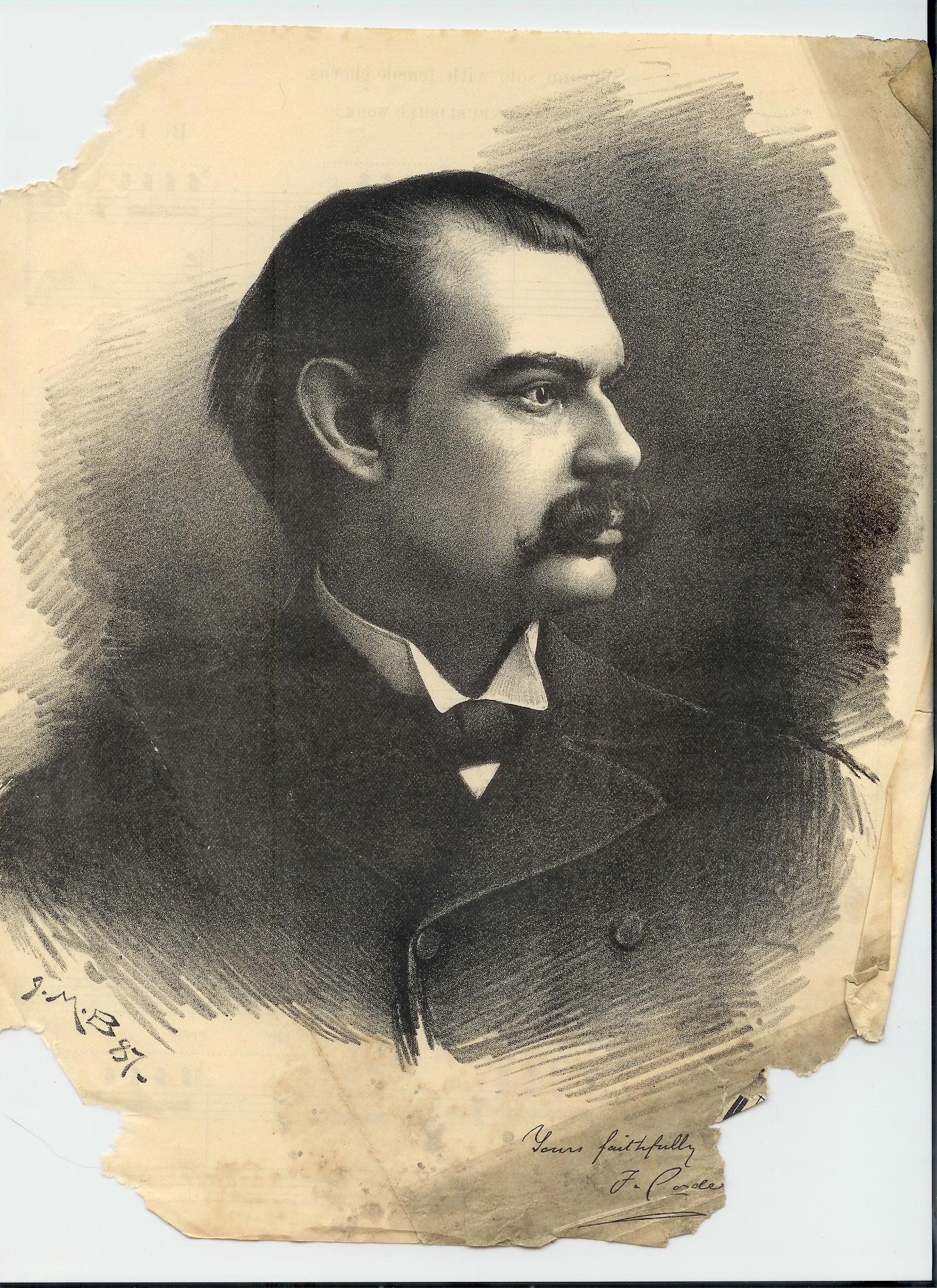
Frederick Corder, librettist and composer of Nordisa

Nordisa is a grand opera in three acts with a libretto by the composer, Frederick Corder. A romance, the work was commissioned by Carl Rosa for his own touring Carl Rosa Opera Company and was first performed at the Royal Court Theatre in Liverpool on 26 January 1887. Today the work is largely forgotten.

== Original cast ==
- Nordisa, a peasant girl – Fanny Moody
- Count Oscar Lydal a young aristocrat – Payne Clarke
- Baroness Nymark, Count Oscar's aunt – Jenny Dickerson
- Minna, Baroness Nymark's daughter – Georgina Burns
- Lieutenant Frederick Hansen – Mr F. H. Celli
- Andreas Brand, an old soldier – Max Eugene
- Halvor, an innkeeper, brother-in-law of Andreas – Aynsley Cook
- Margit, Halvor's wife – Kate Drew
- Pastor – Charles Campbell
- Young Shepherd – Annie Cook/Miss Sanky

== Synopsis ==
=== Act 1 ===
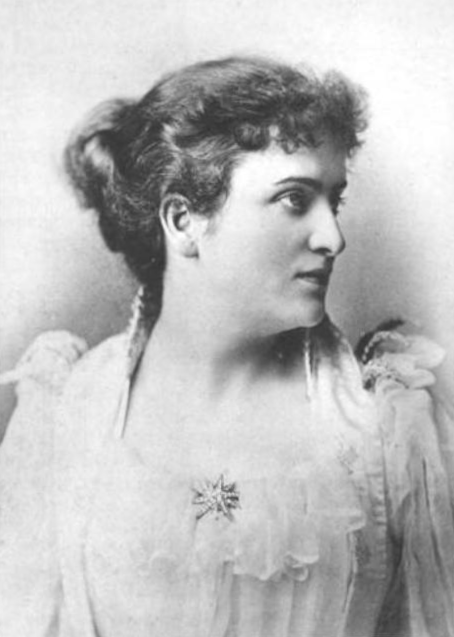
Fanny Moody in 1893. She played the title role in Nordisa

In 1750 an Autumn fair is coming to an end in a village at the foot of the Snaeberg mountain in Norway. Lieutenant Frederick Hansen, a young Army officer, enters the village inn and mentions that he had found the fair dull.

Hansen asks Halvor if his inn has the facilities to cater for a party of travellers. The innkeeper enthusiastically replies that he has, until he learns that the party will include Baroness Nymark and her daughter Minna, at which point he states that his inn is too humble to accommodate them. On arriving, Minna is keen to join the party that closes the fair, but is forbidden by the Baroness, who is concerned her daughter might be mistaken for a peasant girl. It is revealed that Hansen himself is of peasant-stock but gained promotion after saving the life of the late Baron in battle.

The Baroness recognises Halvor and recalls he had returned her daughter Minna to her after the death of her daughter's nurse. The Baroness asks what happened to the nurse's husband, Andreas Brand. Margit, the innkeeper's wife, tells her that Andreas is believed to have been killed in the wars 16 years earlier. Minna inquires after Nordisa, her nurse's daughter, but before anyone can reply loud festivities commence. Minna's fiancé Oscar arrives, but ignores her. He confides to his friend Hansen that, despite the fact he is to marry Minna the next day, he actually loves the owner of a mysterious voice he'd heard singing in the mountains. His marriage to Minna will fulfill a promise he made to his dying father.

A bent and ragged old man comes into the village – Andreas Brand – released after 15 years of imprisonment in Siberian mines. He is told that his wife is dead, but that his daughter is grown to womanhood. Nordisa arrives, and Oscar recognises her as the voice he loves. The Baroness offers money to Nordisa to encourage her to leave, but she refuses it. Nordisa gathers the supplies she will need to survive the winter in the mountains, and as Oscar tries to follow her he is restrained. Andreas Brand leaves the inn in time to see his daughter in the distance, and collapses.

=== Act 2 ===
Having unpacked her ample supplies, Nordisa sits in her lonely hut in the mountains only to discover that Oscar has followed her; he tells her that he loves her. His love, he says, will turn her peasant hut into a palace. She realises that he is the stranger she saw on the mountain before and that she loves him too. He tears himself away when he recalls his promise to his dying father to marry Minna. As he leaves an avalanche descends and Nordisa pulls him back into the hut just as it is buried. Halvor and Andreas Brand see it all from a nearby mountain peak and Brand is struck with grief as he realises his daughter will be trapped in the hut for months.

=== Act 3 ===
Several months have passed and the snow has thawed. Nordisa and Oscar descend the mountain and part. In the villa of the Baroness Minna waits in her wedding dress. Frederick Hansen arrives with a letter for the Baroness from the King. Gradually, he and Minna realise they love each other. The letter from the King offers a commission to the rank of colonel for Minna's husband; she just has to write his name on the document.

The wedding ceremony commences, and the Baroness calls Minna and Oscar forward. Nordisa arrives in a state of excitement and goes straight to Minna. She explains how she and Oscar were trapped under the snow and chastely took care of one another, but that the villagers do not believe this and accuse her of sinning. Oscar states that he is responsible for Nordisa's plight but that she is blameless and sinless. He says his oath to his late father prevents him from marrying any one other than the daughter of the Baroness. Minna declares she cannot possibly marry him now, and berates him for his selfishness. At this moment, Brand and Havlor burst upon the scene. Brand produces a document - a confession - written by his late wife. In it, she states that wishing to see her own daughter dressed in fine clothes, she swapped her for the daughter of the Baron. There is great consternation, and the Baroness accepts Nordisa as her daughter, leaving her free to marry Oscar. Minna, now revealed as the real Nordisa, is free to marry Hansen, who is delighted to receive the rank of colonel from the King.

== Reception ==
In response to the opera's success on its opening night, Carl Rosa gave a supper in celebration at the Grand Hotel in Liverpool. Among the guests were Frederick Corder, the principal cast, Augustus Harris and James Henry Mapleson. Also present were some of the country's leading music critics.
