= Symphony No. 4 (Bax) =

Musical work; symphony in three movements composed by Arnold Bax

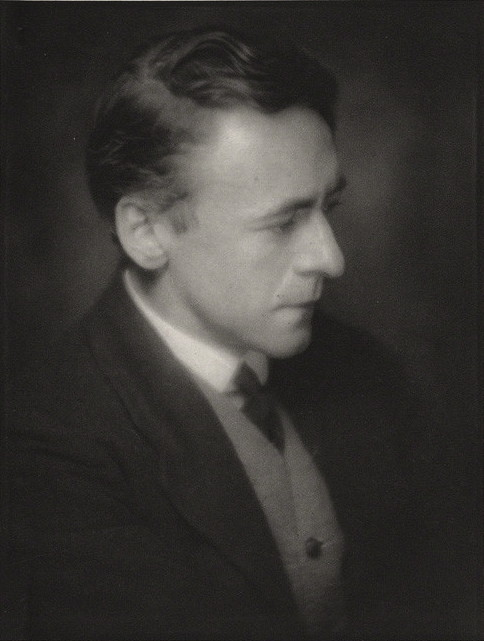
Arnold Bax in 1922

The Symphony No. 4 by Arnold Bax was completed in 1930 and dedicated to Paul Corder. It was inspired by Bax's love of the sea and premiered on 16 March 1932 by British conductor Basil Cameron and the San Francisco Symphony Orchestra.

== Scoring ==
It is scored for piccolo, three flutes, two oboes, English horn, three clarinets, bass clarinet, two bassoons, double bassoon, six horns, three trumpets, three trombones, euphonium or baritone horn, tuba, percussion (timpani, bass drum, snare drum, tambourine, cymbals, gong, xylophone, and glockenspiel), celesta, organ, harp and strings.

== Structure ==
It is in three movements:

1. Allegro moderato
2. Lento moderato – Piu mosso – Poco largemente – Tempo I
3. Allegro – Allegro scherzando – Piu largamente – Vivo

The blustery opening movement begins with the strings and woodwinds playing a joyous melody, eventually joined by solo trumpet. It is probably the most imposing opening of the Bax symphonies, drawing inspiration from the sea. The organ is used and there are six horns (being the most in any Bax symphony). The second subject is much calmer and gorgeously melodic, being introduced by solo oboe and then taken up by the strings. The first movement ends triumphantly and joyously with brass major chords at its close.

The second movement is a quiet, dreamy movement with a memorable melody that is used effectively throughout. It closes peacefully and evokes a quiet day at sea.

The finale sees the return of the mood of the opening movement, being heroic and seascape and opening with distant trumpet trills and a blustery, joyful melody from the timpani and horns. Following this is an allegro scherzando section. The second subject is introduced by the oboe and returns at the end as a triumphal march before the symphony closes with a direct mood of happiness, not common in Bax symphony endings.
