= Chalet School =

Novel series by Elinor M. Brent-Dyer

The Chalet School is a series of 58 school story novels by Elinor M. Brent-Dyer, initially published between 1925 and 1970. The fictional school was initially located in the Austrian Tyrol, before it was moved to Guernsey in 1939 following the rise to power of the Nazi Party, and again to Herefordshire following the Nazi invasion of the Channel Islands. It later moved to a fictional island off the coast of Wales, and finally to Switzerland.

== Plot ==
The Chalet School is founded in 1925 by Madge Bettany when her brother has to return to his job in the Forestry Commission in India. She comes to the conclusion that starting a school would be a convenient way to generate some much-needed income, while also looking after her sickly younger sister Joey. Finding that suitable locations in England would be too expensive for her plans, she decides to look abroad, and finally settles on a large chalet in the Austrian Tyrol, conveniently providing a helpful climate for Joey's recuperation. Within a few years a sanatorium is built not far from the school, where tuberculosis patients convalesce. The founder, Dr Jem Russell, along with Dr Jack Maynard, provides assistance to members of the school and the two Doctors eventually marry Madge and Joey respectively. Robin Humphries is also a main character, until she leaves the Chalet school to go to Oxford and later becomes a nun. The books then follow a variety of characters, including Daisy Venables, Bride Bettany and Gay Lambert, until Mary-Lou Trelawney comes to the school, and becomes the main character for several books. After she leaves school, in the later books, Joey's triplets become main characters.

Throughout the series, various girls arrive at the school with personal problems, bad attitudes or behavioural issues. As a result of the ministrations of better-behaved classmates and the school mistresses, they tend to discover the error of their ways and become model pupils. This formula of a troublesome new girl who reforms and conforms is most common in the later books.

== Reception ==
As with contemporary series of school stories by other authors, the Chalet School books acquired a following of readers who tried to collect each new novel as it came out. Its more exotic setting set it slightly apart from other British series in the same genre. It is the longest of any such novel series.

In the second edition of Helen McClelland's Behind the Chalet School: A Biography of Elinor M. Brent-Dyer (1996), McClelland wrote of the Armada Books paperback editions, published from 1967, that "the books have an excellent selling record. As far as numbers go, the first year figures are the most remarkable: in the six months between May and October 1967, 198,539 copies of Chalet paperbacks were sold - 169,938 at home and 28,601 in the export market. But right up to the present day [1996] annual sales continue to top the 100,000 mark".

Sheila Ray, in the International Companion Encyclopedia of Children's Literature (2004), writes that "Brent-Dyer also wrote other school and family stories, but it is the Chalet School which captured popular imagination, and, at the beginning of the twentieth century, there are two magazines devoted to discussion of her work [and] conferences are held".

== Book details ==
=== Hardback ===
Chalet School books were originally published in hardback between 1925 and 1970 by W. & R. Chambers.

	Title	Year
1	The School at the Chalet	1925
2	Jo of the Chalet School	1926
3	The Princess of the Chalet School	1927
4	The Head Girl of the Chalet School	1928
5	The Rivals of the Chalet School	1929
6	Eustacia Goes to the Chalet School	1930
7	The Chalet School and Jo	1931
8	The Chalet Girls in Camp	1932
9	The Exploits of the Chalet Girls	1933
10	The Chalet School and the Lintons ^{[a]}	1934
11	The New House at the Chalet School	1935
12	Jo Returns to the Chalet School	1936
13	The New Chalet School ^{[b]}	1938
14	The Chalet School in Exile	1940
15	The Chalet School Goes to It ^{[c]}	1941
16	The Highland Twins at the Chalet School	1942
17	Lavender Laughs in the Chalet School ^{[d]}	1943
18	Gay From China at the Chalet School ^{[e]}	1944
19	Jo to the Rescue	1945
20	Three Go to the Chalet School	1949
21	The Chalet School and the Island	1950
22	Peggy of the Chalet School	1950
23	Carola Storms the Chalet School	1951
24	The Wrong Chalet School	1952
25	Shocks for the Chalet School	1952
26	The Chalet School in the Oberland	1952
27	Bride Leads the Chalet School	1953
28	Changes for the Chalet School	1953
29	Joey Goes to the Oberland	1954
30	The Chalet School and Barbara	1954
31	Tom Tackles the Chalet School ^{[f]}	1955
32	The Chalet School Does It Again	1955
33	A Chalet Girl from Kenya	1955
34	Mary-Lou of the Chalet School	1956
35	A Genius at the Chalet School ^{[g]}	1956
36	A Problem for the Chalet School	1956
37	The New Mistress at the Chalet School	1957
38	Excitements at the Chalet School	1957
39	The Coming of Age of the Chalet School	1958
40	The Chalet School and Richenda	1958
41	Trials for the Chalet School	1958
42	Theodora and the Chalet School	1959
43	Joey and Co in Tirol	1960
44	Ruey Richardson: Chaletian ^{[h]}	1960
45	A Leader in the Chalet School	1961
46	The Chalet School Wins the Trick	1961
47	A Future Chalet School Girl	1962
48	The Feud in the Chalet School	1962
49	The Chalet School Triplets	1963
50	The Chalet School Reunion	1963
51	Jane and the Chalet School	1964
52	Redheads at the Chalet School	1964
53	Adrienne and the Chalet School	1965
54	Summer Term at the Chalet School	1965
55	Challenge for the Chalet School	1966
56	Two Sams at the Chalet School	1967
57	Althea Joins the Chalet School	1969
58	Prefects of the Chalet School	1970

=== Paperback ===
The novels were reissued in paperback format between 1967 and 1995. Usually with updated language. Some were more or less uncut, but many others were abridged to various extents, including chapters deleted from some titles. A few were split into two paperback volumes, and several were retitled.

	Hardback	Paperback
10	The Chalet School and the Lintons	The Chalet School and the Lintons
10	The Chalet School and the Lintons	A Rebel at the Chalet School
13	The New Chalet School	The New Chalet School
13	The New Chalet School	A United Chalet School
15	The Chalet School Goes to It	The Chalet School at War
17	Lavender Laughs in the Chalet School	Lavender Leigh at the Chalet School
18	Gay From China at the Chalet School	Gay Lambert at the Chalet School
35	A Genius at the Chalet School	A Genius at the Chalet School
35	A Genius at the Chalet School	Chalet School Fête
44	Ruey Richardson: Chaletian	Ruey Richardson at the Chalet School

=== Additional books ===
Title	Year
The Chalet Book for Girls (including The Mystery at the Chalet School)	1947
The Second Chalet Book for Girls (including Tom Tackles the Chalet School, part 1)	1948
The Third Chalet Book for Girls (including Tom Tackles the Chalet School, part 2)	1949
The Chalet School and Rosalie	1951
The Chalet Girls' Cookbook	1953
The Chalet Club News Letter Book	2004
Elinor M. Brent-Dyer's Short Stories	2004

=== Books by other authors ===
Many authors have written books set in the Chalet School universe. Sheila Ray has written that "Some of them, it must be said, are rather better written than Brent-Dyer's own later books". Some of the books are set before the Chalet School is founded, some of them follow on from the last book of the series, and others attempt to fill in some of the "gaps" in the earlier years of the school. All books are published by Girls Gone By Publishers unless otherwise stated.

==== Prequels ====
These titles describe the events which led to the founding of the Chalet School.

- Before the Chalet School: The Bettanys on the Home Front – Helen Barber (2015) - Begins during Summer Holidays 1914 and ends a year later in 1915
- Before the Chalet School: The Bettanys of Taverton High – Helen Barber (2008, 2022) - Set in the term before The School at the Chalet and Simone at the Chalet School and Before the Chalet School: Last Term at Taverton High
- Before the Chalet School: Last Term at Taverton High – Helen Barber (2018) - Set in the same term as The School at the Chalet and Simone at the Chalet School

==== Fill in novels ====
This list contains all fill ins that have been published that fit within the time-scale of the Chalet School universe written by Elinor Brent-Dyer (i.e. not preceding or following it). The second title listed is the book that immediately precedes the respective fill in unless otherwise stated.

- Visitors for the Chalet School - Helen McClelland (1995) Published by Bettany Press (1995); Published by Collins (2000) - The Princess of the Chalet School
- Joey and Patricia: A Reunion in Guernsey – Helen McClelland (2000, 2018) Published by The New Chalet Club – Set during the gap in The Chalet School in Exile
- Gillian of the Chalet School – Carol Allan (2001, 2006, 2018) – The New Chalet School (and A United Chalet School)
- The Chalet School and Robin – Caroline German (2003, 2012) – The Chalet School Goes to It
- A Chalet School Headmistress – Helen Barber (2004, 2017) – Set in the same term as The Mystery at the Chalet School
- Hilda Annersley: Headmistress – Lesley Green (2005) Published by Matador – Same time period as Gay from China at the Chalet School, Jo to the Rescue, The Mystery at the Chalet School, A Chalet School Headmistress, Tom Tackles the Chalet School, and the first half of The Chalet School and Rosalie
- Peace Comes to the Chalet School – Katherine Bruce (2005, 2020) – A Guernsey Girl at the Chalet School
- Juliet of the Chalet School – Caroline German (2006) – The Guides of the Chalet School
- Two Chalet School Girls in India – Priyadarshini Narendra (2006) Published by Bettany Press - The New Chalet School (and A United Chalet School)
- Cornelia of the Chalet School – Jackie Roberts (2009) Published by Yersinia Press – Same time period as Three go to the Chalet School and A Difficult Term for the Chalet School
- The Guides of the Chalet School – Jane Berry (2009) – Jo of the Chalet School
- Deira Joins the Chalet School – Caroline German (2010) – Juliet of the Chalet School
- A Difficult Term for the Chalet School – Lisa Townsend (2011, 2021) – Three Go to the Chalet School
- The Müller Twins at the Chalet School – Katherine Bruce (2012) – Jo Returns to the Chalet School
- Champion of the Chalet School – Adrianne Fitzpatrick (2014) – Peace Comes to the Chalet School
- Surprises for the Chalet School – Jackie Roberts (2014) Published by Yersinia Press – Same time period as The Chalet School and the Island and Peggy of the Chalet School
- Joey and Co in Canada – Jackie Roberts (2016) Published by Yersinia Press – Same time period as The Wrong Chalet School, Shocks for the Chalet School, Maeve of the Chalet School, and The Chalet School in the Oberland
- Juniors of the Chalet School – Katherine Bruce (2016) – Set in the same term as The Princess of the Chalet School
- Sisters at the Chalet School – Amy Fletcher (2017) – The Chalet School and Rosalie
- The Chalet School Annexe – Adrianne Fitzpatrick (2018) – Set in the same term as The Exploits of the Chalet Girls
- The Chalet School and Cornelia – Katherine Bruce (2019) – Set in the summer term of The Head Girl of the Chalet School
- A Refuge for the Chalet School – Amy Fletcher (2019) – Set during the gap in The Chalet School in Exile
- The Bettany Twins and the Chalet School - Helen Barber (2020) - Same time period as Tom Tackles the Chalet School and The Chalet School and Rosalie and Primula of the Chalet School
- The Chalet School in Guernsey – Katherine Bruce (2020) – The Chalet School in Exile
- The Chalet School Returns to the Alps - Lisa Townsend (2021) - Set in the same term as The Chalet School and Barbara and The Chalet School at Glendower House
- A Guernsey Girl at the Chalet School - Amy Fletcher (2021) - Sisters at the Chalet School
- Flight of a Chalet School Girl - Katherine Bruce (2022) - Begins during the gap between The New Chalet School (and A United Chalet School) and The Chalet School in Exile - Ends during The Highland Twins at the Chalet School
- Maeve of the Chalet School - Helen Barber (2022) - Set in the same term as Shocks for the Chalet School and The Chalet School in the Oberland
- Rosamund Heads the Chalet School - Lisa Townsend (2023) - Set in the same term as Redheads at the Chalet School
- Millies of the Chalet School - Sarah Wright (2024) - Set in the same term as Mary Lou of the Chalet School
- The Chalet School at Glendower House - Sheryl Burke (2024) - Set in the same term as The Chalet School and Barbara and The Chalet School Returns to the Alps
- Primula of the Chalet School - Helen Barber (2025) - Set in the same term as The Chalet School and Rosalie and The Bettany Twins and the Chalet School
- Simone at the Chalet School - Amy Fletcher (2025) - Set in the same term as The School at the Chalet and Before the Chalet School: Last Term at Taverton High
- Seniors of the Chalet School - Lisa Townsend (2025) - Set in the same term as Althea Joins the Chalet School and Prefects of the Chalet School
- The Chalet School in Peril - Katherine Bruce (2026) - Set during the first part of The Chalet School in Exile

==== Sequels ====
The first published of these

- The Chalet Girls Grow Up, by Merryn Williams (1998) Published by Plas Gwyn Books - Set between July 1966 and March 1990, has been described as "a deeply cynical and satirical continuation of the series which lays waste all the much-loved characters". Daisy May Johnson has said of it:

It's a book that has, rightly or wrongly, reached an almost mythological status ... Williams writes well. She borders on pastiche at some points which is inevitable considering the nature of the beast, but her language and her turn of phrase is quiet, solid and undeniably poetic at points ... the fact that it is so very bluntly darkly real, will always prove troublesome ... Her relationship to the series feels spectacularly complex. And angry. And yet, vividly, warmly, loving ... So would I recommend you read this? Yes, I think I would.

These books follow on after Prefects of the Chalet School:

- New Beginnings at the Chalet School – Heather Paisley (1999) Published by Friends of the Chalet School (1999) and by Girls Gone By Publishers (2002, 2006, 2020) - Takes place three years after the end of Prefects of the Chalet School
- Nicola Goes To The Oberland – Josephine M. Hardman (2010) Published by Blurb - Takes place over the year immediately following New Beginnings at the Chalet School
- The Chalet School Librarian – Pat Willimott (2005) Published by Matador - Takes place one year after New Beginnings at the Chalet School

==== Collections ====
A collection of stories that takes place at various points throughout the series:

- The Chalet School Christmas Story Book - various authors (2007)
- Chalet School World – Helen Barber (2013)
- Tales from the Chalet School - Helen Barber and Katherine Bruce (2023)
- More Tales from the Chalet School... and Beyond - Adrianne Fitzpatrick (2024)
- Further Tales from the Chalet School - Lisa Townsend (2026)
