= Charles Manners (bass) =

British singer and opera company manager (1857–1935)

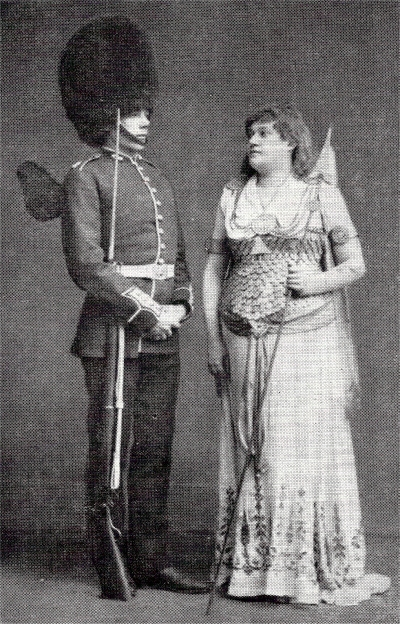
Charles Manners and Alice Barnett in Iolanthe, 1882

Charles Manners (27 December 1857 – 3 May 1935) was a British bass singer and opera company manager. His earliest performances were with the D'Oyly Carte Opera Company, first as a chorus member and then as a principal, creating the role of Private Willis in Iolanthe in 1882. After leaving D'Oyly Carte the following year, he sang with several opera companies, most notably the Carl Rosa Opera Company and Covent Garden. In 1898, he and his wife, the singer Fanny Moody, set up their own company, dedicated to presenting opera in English.

The Moody-Manners company performed in London, the British provinces, North America and South Africa from 1898 to 1916. After his retirement, Manners continued to campaign for a national opera company, which was eventually founded forty years after his death.

== Life and career ==
=== Early years ===
Manners was born Southcote Randal Bernard Campbell Mansergh in Hoddesdon, (Note: According to most references, but The Musical Times obituary, July 1935, p. 656, records his place of birth as London) England, son of Colonel J. C. Mansergh, an Irishman. He was educated at Hoddesdon Grammar School and considered a career in the army. He tried engineering and stockbrokerage before deciding on music as a profession. He studied at the Royal Irish Academy in Dublin, the Royal Academy of Music in London, and in Florence.

In either 1881 or 1882 he joined the D'Oyly Carte Opera Company as a chorus member. (Note: According to Manners, in his letter to The Manchester Guardian, 27 September 1899, he served for eighteen months in the chorus before becoming a principal, which would mean that he joined in the spring of 1881. The Times obituary (7 May 1935) also gives 1881 as the year in which he joined the company. Rollins and Witts, on the other hand, date his membership to 1882.) In early 1882, he appeared on tour in the chorus of Claude Duval and, later in the same year, in the chorus of H.M.S. Pinafore and The Pirates of Penzance. He was promoted to the roles of Dick Deadeye in Pinafore and Samuel in Pirates in August 1882. He also appeared as Mr. Wallaby in the companion piece Quite an Adventure. In November 1882, he created the role of Private Willis in Iolanthe at the Savoy Theatre.

Manners left the D'Oyly Carte company in late 1883. In 1884, he sang Boleslas in Falka on tour. In 1885 he sang in light opera at the new Empire Theatre, and played Wickermark in a romantic opera, The Fay o' Fire at the Opera Comique with the young Marie Tempest. In 1886, he joined a touring opera troupe called "The Royal English Opera Company", later renamed "Sydney Leslie's Opera Company", playing Bartolo in The Marriage of Figaro, and the Commendatore in Don Giovanni. For another touring company he played in the comic opera, Falka: "as Boleslas there is opportunity for display of a powerful physique and a good voice that Mr. Charles Manners is not slow to make use of." With the same company he played General Bombardos in the English première of Charles Lecocq's Pepita.

=== Carl Rosa and Covent Garden ===
In June 1887, Manners signed a two-year contract with the Carl Rosa Opera Company as a principal bass, making his début as King Henry in Lohengrin. His early roles for the company included Peter the Great in Meyerbeer's L'étoile du nord, the King of Spain in Maritana, Pietro in Auber's Masaniello, and Bertram in Robert the Devil. His later roles included Mephistopheles in Faust, and Cardina Brogni in La Juive. A fellow member of the company was the Cornish soprano Fanny Moody, whom Manners married at St George's, Hanover Square on 5 July 1890. When not touring in opera, Manners took part in concerts in London and the provinces, gaining favourable reviews. He was one of three singers invited to tour with Sims Reeves in Reeves's farewell series of concerts.

In October 1890 Manners joined the Covent Garden company, making his debut in Roberto il Diavolo. "The English basso-profondo, Mr. Charles Manners, sang with grand effect the music allotted to Bertram, and his acting was powerfully impressive." For the same management, this time at the Olympic Theatre, he appeared as King Henry in Wagner's Lohengrin (given in Italian: his role was billed as "Enrico l'Ucellatore") with Emma Albani as Elsa; and as Gremin in the British première of Eugene Onegin conducted by Henry Wood, with Fanny Moody as Tatiana.

In 1893 he made his New York début, and on his return he and Moody signed to appear with Augustus Harris's opera company. Among other roles, Manners played Devilshoof in The Bohemian Girl at the Theatre Royal, Drury Lane with Moody as Arline. In 1896–97 he made a successful and remunerative tour of South Africa with Moody. When they returned to England in 1898, they formed the Moody-Manners Company.

=== Moody-Manners Opera Company ===
Manners's ambition was to found a company to give opera in English that would, in time, become a permanent national ensemble based in London. With limited capital at their disposal (Manners later stated that they founded the company on £1,700 borrowed from friends, and repaid it all within a year), they began with a provincial tour, starting in Manchester in September 1898. The Manchester Guardian commented, "There can be no greater proof of the energy of Mr Manners as a director than the fact of his having produced during the second week of his career as a manager no fewer than seven different operas, two of which were absolute novelties in the provinces." Of Manners himself, the paper wrote, "a highly gifted artist … whose voice seems to have lost none of the beauty which was so much admired in the far-away days when he was the Lifeguardsman in Iolanthe." Moody was the company's leading soprano.

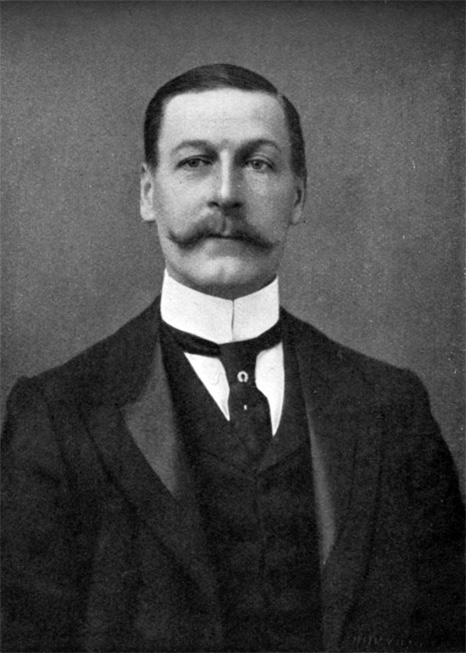
Manners circa 1900

By 1902 there were two Moody-Manners touring companies. The larger of the two had 175 members and gave London seasons in 1902 and 1903 at Covent Garden, in 1904 at Drury Lane, and in 1907 and 1908 at the Lyric Theatre when the repertoire included The Merry Wives of Windsor, The Marriage of Figaro, Tannhäuser, Lohengrin, Tristan and Isolde, Faust, Cavalleria rusticana and Pagliacci, Madame Butterfly, Aïda and Il trovatore. There were Moody-Manners tours not only of Britain but also of North America and South Africa.

The opera historian Harold Rosenthal wrote of the Moody-Manners company: "With the Carl Rosa company, it was the principal training ground for British artists in the years before World War I." Manners held strong views about the training given by British music academies to young singers. In his view students were not equipped for a professional career because they were trained in the principal operatic roles rather than in the chorus parts, which almost all singers new to the profession would need to sing before being promoted to leading roles. He instanced his own early career: "I studied both at the Royal Academy, Dublin, and the Royal Academy, London, and then in Italy, and when I came back to London, all I could get was an engagement in comic opera where I sang for eighteen months before I could become a principal. It was not till over six years after I left my studies that I found anything I had learnt at the academies of any value to me."

Manners encouraged British composers to write for his company, offering prizes for the best operas: one of the prize-winners was Colin McAlpin's The Cross and the Crescent (1903). He sponsored opera festivals in Sheffield in 1904 and 1906, whose profits helped to found Sheffield University. He also used profits from a successful season in Glasgow in 1906 to help create the Glasgow Grand Opera Society, which continued his work in popularising opera in English between the two World Wars. By 1910, Manners faced financial difficulties and had to disband one of his two companies, and the remaining Moody-Manners Company gave its last performance in May 1916. Manners retired from singing in 1913. In its final season, playing to capacity audiences, the Moody-Manners company offered Il trovatore, The Bohemian Girl, Martha, Faust, The Lily of Killarney, The Daughter of the Regiment, Carmen, and Eugene Onegin, with Moody as Tatiana.

After the closure of his companies, Manners continued to campaign for a national opera company. He wrote to The Musical Times in 1921, "I here assert for the thousandth time that National Grand Opera can be given in an all round way at popular prices – I repeat, popular prices – far better than it has ever been given, without a cost of a farthing to the rates or taxes." In 1926 he wrote a long article on "The Financial Problem of National Opera. By the People for the People", explaining his rationale. He disapproved of public subsidy, insisting that opera could be self-supporting and even profitable. Although later attempts to follow his precepts, such as those of Raymond Gubbay at the Savoy Theatre in 2004, have failed, his dream of a national opera company presenting operas in English has been realised.

Manners and Moody retired to Ireland, where he died at Dundrum, County Dublin, aged 77.

== Sources ==
- Hubbard, W.L. and H.E. Krehbiel. The American History and Encyclopedia of Music: Operas Part II, Squire-Cooley Co., Toledo, Ohio, USA (1924)
- Mander, Raymond and Joe Mitchenson. A Picture History of Gilbert and Sullivan, Vista Books, London (1962)
- Rollins, Cyril and R. John Witts. The D'Oyly Carte Company in Gilbert and Sullivan Operas. Michael Joseph, London (1962)
- Warrack, John and Ewan West. The Concise Oxford Dictionary of Opera, Oxford University Press, p. 345 (3rd Edition, 1996) ISBN 0192800280
