= Alexander Kelly (pianist) =

British pianist and composer

Alexander Kelly (30 June 1929 – 23 October 1996) was a British pianist, composer and former head of keyboard studies at the Royal Academy of Music.

Kelly studied piano with Harold Craxton and composition with Sir Lennox Berkeley on a James Caird scholarship at the Royal Academy of Music.

He gave his Royal Festival Hall debut under Sir Thomas Beecham and, in 1957, gave his Wigmore Hall debut: playing the Diabelli Variations by Beethoven. Later performances included works by William Sterndale Bennett, Peter Wishart, and John Maxwell Geddes, among others.

As a teacher, Kelly was much sought after: beginning his teaching career at the Royal Academy of Music in 1960, and teaching there for over 30 years (until his retirement in 1992). His former pupils include, among others, Peter Jacobs, David Owen Norris, Iain Burnside, and Jonathan Plowright. He became head of the RAM's keyboard department in 1984. In addition to his teaching he also gave regular masterclasses at most of the major music colleges in the country and a series of his masterclasses were broadcast on Classic FM. He was on the judging panel of the: Scottish International Piano Competition, Caird Scholarship, and was an examiner for the Associated Board of the Royal Schools of Music.

Also active in the field of chamber music he performed regularly with, amongst others, the violinist Jean Harvey, the tenor Duncan Robertson and the flautist William Bennett.

In 1957 he married the cellist Margaret Moncrieff and they had two daughters: the cellist Alison Moncrieff Kelly, and Catriona Kelly, now a Professor of Russian Literature at New College, Oxford. He also had two grandchildren, Camilla Davan-Wetton and Alexander Davan-Wetton. As a wedding present to Kelly and Moncrieff, the composer Peter Wishart wrote a Piano Concerto which Kelly premiered in Birmingham in 1958. Wishart's piano solo, "Opheis kai klimakes" (Snakes and Ladders) was written to celebrate Catriona's birth in 1959.
