= Elinor Brent-Dyer =

English children's author

- Born: Gladys Eleanor May Dyer; 6 April 1894 South Shields, England
- Died: 20 September 1969 (aged 75)
- Occupation: Novelist
- Period: 1922–1969
- Genre: Adventure and school stories

Elinor M. Brent-Dyer (6 April 1894 – 20 September 1969) was an English writer of children's literature who wrote more than one hundred books during her lifetime, the most famous being the Chalet School series.

== Early life and education ==
Brent-Dyer was born Gladys Eleanor May Dyer on 6 April 1894 in South Shields. She was the only daughter of Charles Morris Brent Dyer, a surveyor, and Eleanor Watson Rutherford. Her father left the family when she was three years old and her mother remarried in 1913. In 1912, her younger brother Henzell died of meningitis.

Brent-Dyer was educated privately at a small school in South Shields until 1912 and shortly afterward trained to teach at City of Leeds Training College. She taught a variety of subjects at both state and private schools and ran a Girl Guide group. In the 1920s, she briefly studied music under Edgar Bainton at the Newcastle Conservatoire.

== Career ==
Brent-Dyer's first book, Gerry Goes to School, was published in 1922 and became the first of the La Rochelle series.

She was inspired to start the Chalet School series after holidaying in the Austrian Tyrol at Pertisau-am-Achensee. The first book in the series, The School at the Chalet, was published in 1925.

Although she was raised as an Anglican, she converted to Roman Catholicism in 1930.

In 1933, Brent-Dyer and her mother moved to Hereford, where Brent-Dyer was employed as a governess in Peterchurch. In 1938, she opened her own school, the Margaret Roper School, which closed in 1948. She then dedicated all of her time to writing.

Brent-Dyer's mother died in 1957. In 1964, her long-time friend Phyllis Matthewman persuaded her to leave the unmanageably large Victorian villa at which she had previously run her school to live with Phyllis and her literary agent husband, Sydney. After first living together as tenants in half of a house called Albury Edge, at Redhill, Surrey, they bought a house together, Gryphons, also at Redhill, in 1965. Phyllis's aunt, who knew the Dyer family, had introduced them to one another in childhood. Sydney Matthewman served as Brent-Dyer's agent. Brent-Dyer died at Redhill in 1969 and her final book was published posthumously the following year.

== Critical reception ==
The academic Karen Attar has written about Brent-Dyer's portrayal of reading in her books. Brent-Dyer is one of the few writers of girls' school stories whose characters are shown reading. Attar concludes that Brent-Dyer "transforms the school story by turning the games-mad institution to one with an intellectual emphasis, while retaining readers. She ... portrays the unportrayable solitary activity as an enjoyable, often communal, one, and guides her readers to broad, sound reading through the reading of her characters. ... This is a legacy of which to be proud".

== Bibliography ==
=== Chalet School series ===
(in reading order)

1. The School at the Chalet
2. Jo of the Chalet School
3. The Princess of the Chalet School
4. The Head-Girl of the Chalet School
5. The Rivals of the Chalet School
6. Eustacia Goes to the Chalet School
7. The Chalet School and Jo
8. The Chalet Girls in Camp
9. The Exploits of the Chalet Girls
10. The Chalet School and the Lintons
11. The New House at the Chalet School
12. Jo Returns to the Chalet School
13. The New Chalet School
14. The Chalet School in Exile
15. The Chalet School Goes to It
16. Highland Twins at the Chalet School
17. Lavender Laughs in the Chalet School
18. Gay From China at the Chalet School
19. Jo to the Rescue
  a Mystery at the Chalet School
  b Tom Tackles the Chalet School
  c The Chalet School and Rosalie
20. Three Go to the Chalet School
21. The Chalet School and the Island
22. Peggy of the Chalet School
23. Carola Storms the Chalet School
24. The Wrong Chalet School
25. Shocks for the Chalet School
26. The Chalet School in the Oberland
27. Bride Leads the Chalet School
28. Changes for the Chalet School
29. Joey Goes to the Oberland
30. The Chalet School and Barbara
31. The Chalet School Does it Again
32. A Chalet Girl from Kenya
33. Mary-Lou of the Chalet School
34. A Genius at the Chalet School
35. A Problem for the Chalet School
36. The New Mistress at the Chalet School
37. Excitements at the Chalet School
38. The Coming of Age of the Chalet School
39. The Chalet School and Richenda
40. Trials for the Chalet School
41. Theodora and the Chalet School
42. Joey and Co. in Tirol
43. Ruey Richardson – Chaletian
44. A Leader in the Chalet School
45. The Chalet School Wins the Trick
46. A Future Chalet School Girl
47. The Feud in the Chalet School
48. The Chalet School Triplets
49. The Chalet School Reunion
50. Jane and the Chalet School
51. Redheads at the Chalet School
52. Adrienne and the Chalet School
53. Summer Term at the Chalet School
54. Challenge for the Chalet School
55. Two Sams at the Chalet School
56. Althea Joins the Chalet School
57. Prefects of the Chalet School

=== La Rochelle series ===
- Gerry Goes to School (1922)
- A Head Girl's Difficulties (1923)
- The Maids of La Rochelle
- Seven Scamps
- Heather Leaves School
- Janie of La Rochelle
- Janie Steps In

=== Chudleigh Hold series ===
A loosely connected series of adventure books

- Chudleigh Hold
- The Condor Crags Adventure
- Top Secret
- Fardingales
- The Susannah Adventure

=== Other works ===
- A Thrilling Term at Janeways
- Caroline the Second
- The School by the River (1930)
- The New House-Mistress
- Judy, the Guide (1928)
- The Feud in the Fifth Remove
- Carnation of the Upper Fourth
- They Both Liked Dogs
- The School by the River
- The Little Marie-Jose
- Elizabeth the Gallant
- The Little Missus
- Lorna at Wynyards
- Stepsisters for Lorna
- Kennelmaid Nan
- Nesta Steps Out
- Beechy of the Harbour School
- A Leader in Spite of Herself
- The School at Skelton Hall
- Trouble at Skelton Hall
- Bess on Her Own in Canada
- A Quintette in Queensland
- Sharlie's Kenya Diary
- Verena Visits New Zealand
- Jean of Storms (novel for adults, originally published in the Shields Gazette in 1930)
- The Lost Staircase
- Monica Turns Up Trumps
