= Frederick Corder =

English composer and music teacher

Frederick Corder (26 January 1852 – 21 August 1932) was an English composer and music teacher.

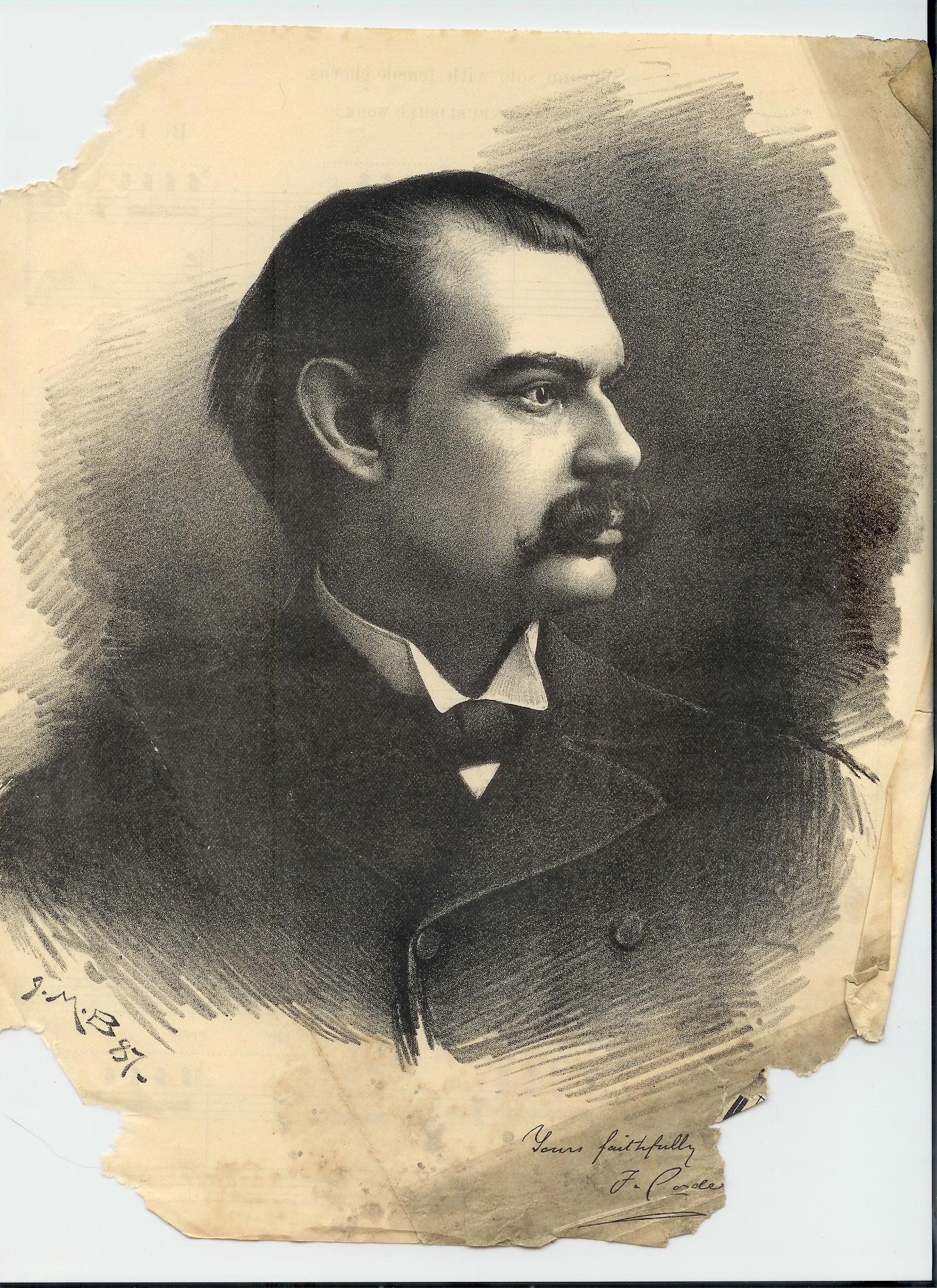
Frederick Corder (1852–1932) in 1887

== Life ==
Corder was born in Hackney, the son of Micah Corder and his wife Charlotte Hill. He was educated at Blackheath Proprietary School and started music lessons, particularly piano, early. Later he studied with Henry Gadsby. After that he studied harmony with Claude Couldery.

Frederick Corder continued his studies at the Royal Academy of Music, where he studied with George Alexander Macfarren (harmony and composition), William Cusins (piano) and William Watson (violin). In 1875, he earned a Mendelssohn Scholarship, which enabled him to study for four years abroad. He spent the first three in the Cologne Conservatory in Cologne, where he studied composition with Ferdinand Hiller and piano with Isidor Seiss. He spent his last year in Milan, without formal instruction. He did however meet Arrigo Boito and Giuseppe Verdi. Upon his return to England, in 1879, he became conductor at the Brighton Aquarium. In August 1884, for a single month, he filled in for William Robinson as a musical director for the D'Oyly Carte Opera Company, touring Patience and Iolanthe. Several of his operatic works were performed by the touring company of Alice Barth in the early 1880s.

Corder became professor of composition at the Royal Academy of Music in London, becoming the Academy's curator in 1889. His students included notable British composers such as Granville Bantock, Arnold Bax, York Bowen, Alan Bush, Eric Coates, Benjamin Dale, Harry Farjeon, Joseph Holbrooke and Montague Phillips, as well as his own son, Paul Corder. With others, Frederick Corder co-founded the Society of British Composers in 1905 and served as its first chairman. While at the Academy, Corder was living at 13, Albion Road (now Harben Road) in Hampstead, where he often held gatherings of fellow musicians and students, including Bax.

He developed an early fascination with Richard Wagner and produced with his wife the first accepted English translations of The Ring and other works by Wagner. Liszt was also an important influence, and Corder produced one of the first English language studies of Liszt. His own compositions included songs, operas and cantatas. Corder's Prospero overture is available in full score and can be heard on CD. Corder married Henrietta Walford, the daughter of Henry Walford on 25 September 1876. They had a daughter, Dorothea Charlotte (known as Dolly), born on 30 June 1878 (died in her nineties), and a son, Paul Walford Corder, born on 14 December 1879 (died on 7 August 1942). Corder's sister, Rosa Corder, was a friend of Dante Gabriel Rossetti and painted his portrait. He married his second wife, the pianist and composer Eleanor Rudall in 1927.

== Legacy ==
Corder's opposite number at the Royal Academy of Music was Charles Villiers Stanford. He represented the conservative Brahms faction of English academia, whereas Corder followed the more progressive influence of Liszt and Wagner. In particular, many of Corder's pupils showed the influence of the "clever primitivism and latent giganticism" of The Ring, but little of the eroticism of Tristan. History favours the legacy of Stanford, whose pupils included Vaughan Williams, John Ireland, Gustav Holst and Frank Bridge, while (arguably) Corder's one major talent was Bax. The critic Peter J Pirie put in this way:

Corder's methods were progressive but too easygoing, and all his pupils, even the devastatingly gifted Bax, suffered from it. Stanford was perhaps the better teacher, but he was also cruelly repressive, reactionary, and insensitive. All his pupils took years to live down the chronic sense of inferiority he imparted. Bantock, Holbrooke and Bax suffered from a lack of self-discipline.

== Works (selective) ==
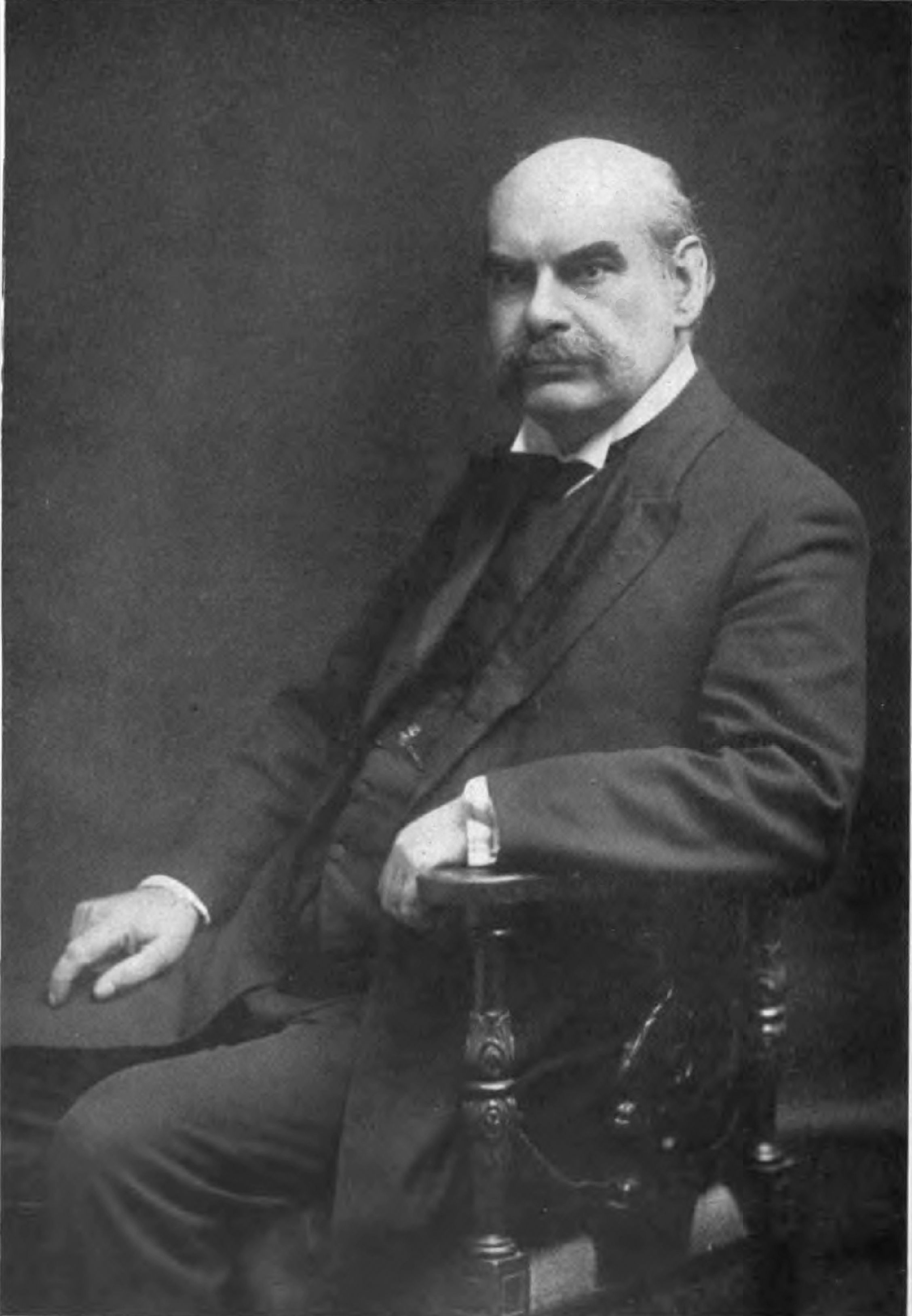
Frederick Corder (1852–1932) in 1913

The principal source for this list, including opus numbers, is an article on the composer published in The Musical Times.

=== Opera and operetta ===
- 1877–78 – Le Mort d'Arthur, grand opera, Op.3 (Brighton, 1879)
- 1880 – Philomel, operatic satire, Op.4
- 1880 – A Storm in a Teacup, operetta, Op.5 (Aquarium, Brighton, 18 February 1882)
- 1883 – The Nabob's Pickle, operetta, Op.12 (Aquarium, Great Yarmouth, 9 July 1883)
- 1885 – The Noble Savage, operetta, Op.13 (Aquarium, Brighton, 3 October 1885)
- 1887 – Nordisa, romantic opera, Op.17 (Royal Court Theatre, Liverpool, 26 January 1887) An Incident during a Carl Rosa Opera Company's production of this opera on Thursday April 7. 1887 in the Tyne Theatre & Opera House is the start point of the story of how the "Official Theatre Ghost" of the Theatre was begun. Ref: Newcastle Daily Journal No.9,702 – Friday April 8. p5-6.1887
- Ossian
- The Golden Dawn

=== Incidental music ===
- 1898 – The Termagant, overture and incidental music, Op.25 (Her Majesty's Theatre, London, 1 September 1898)
- 1899 – The Black Tulip, overture and incidental music, Op.26 (Haymarket Theatre, London, 21 October 1899)
- 1911 – The Pageant of London (Crystal Palace, London, 8 June 1911) [composite work by many composers: Corder was allocated the final section, The Masque Imperial]

=== Orchestra ===
- 1876 – Evening on the Sea-Shore, idyll, Op.1 (St James's Hall, London, 25 November 1886)
- 1876–79 – In the Black Forest, suite, Op.2 (second movement, The Brooklet, rondo scherzoso, St James's Hall, London, 17 December 1878; complete suite, Crystal Palace, London, 20 March 1880)
- 1882 – Ossian, concert overture, Op.8 (Philharmonic Society, St James's Hall, London, 9 March 1882)
- 1882 – Nocturne, Op.9 (Brighton Festival, 8 November 1882)
- 1885 – Prospero, concert overture, Op.14 (Crystal Palace, London, 24 October 1885)
- 1886 – The Tempest, orchestral scenes, Op.15 (Crystal Palace, London, 2 April 1887)
- 1887 – Roumanian Suite, Op.18 (Philharmonic Society, St James's Hall, London, 19 May 1887)
- 1892 – Nordisa, overture (Crystal Palace, London, 17 December 1892)
- 1897 – Pippa Passes, orchestral scena drammatica, Op.24 (Philharmonic Society, Queen's Hall, London, 28 April 1898)
- 1901 – Tragic Overture (Winter Gardens, Bournemouth, 16 January 1902)
- 1901 – Scene d'Amour (Winter Gardens, Bournemouth, 16 January 1902)
- 1908 – Elegy for Twenty-four Violins and Organ In memoriam Victor Harris, Op.28 (Queen's Hall, London, 18 November 1908)
- Galliard for Katherine and Petruccio

=== Instrumental soloist and orchestra ===
- Concerto for cornet and orchestra

=== Choral and vocal ===
- 1879 – The Triumph of Spring, masque (Crystal Palace, London, 8 February 1879)
- 1881 – The Cyclops, cantata, Op.6
- 1883 – Dreamland, symphonic ode for chorus and orchestra, Op.10
- 1886 – The Bridal of Triermain, cantata, Op.16 (Wolverhampton Festival, 17 September 1886)
- 1888 – The Minstrel's Curse, ballad for reciter and orchestra, Op.19 (Crystal Palace, London, 10 March 1888)
- 1889 – The Sword of Argantyr, cantata, Op.20 (Leeds Festival, 9 October 1889)
- 1893 – Margaret: The Blind Girl of Castel-Cuillé, for female voices and piano, Op.21
- 1895 – True Thomas, musical recitation, Op.23
- 1902 – The Witch's Song, musical recitation, Op.27
- 1912 – Sing unto God, motet in fifty parts for female voices, organ, harps, trumpets and drums, Op.29 (Royal Academy of Music, London, 22 June 1912)
- 1922 – A Wreath of a Hundred Roses [The R.A.M. Masque], Section 4: Quodlibet (Royal Academy of Music, London, 17 July 1922)
- Sweet day so cool! for voices and orchestra
- The Mother, lament for soprano solo, female choir, strings and harp (or piano)
- Romance and Play, two partsongs for female voices (in canon) and orchestra

=== Vocal soloist and orchestra ===
- Greenford Lane, a modern folksong for baritone and orchestra

=== Chamber music ===
- Peace, nocturne for four horns and two harps

== Scores and manuscripts ==
Several works by Corder were published but the large majority of his autograph scores do not survive.

Novello, Ewer & Co., London, published full orchestral scores of Prospero and the Elegy for Twenty-four Violins and Organ together with a vocal score of The Bridal of Triermain. Joseph Williams, London, issued a vocal score of Margaret: The Blind Girl of Castel-Cuillé. Forsyth Brothers, Manchester, published vocal scores of Nordisa and The Sword of Argantyr.

The Library of the Royal Academy of Music, London, hold the following autograph scores:

- In the Black Forest (MS 511),
- Romance and Play, two partsongs (MS 512)
- Galliard for Katherine and Petruccio (MS 513)
- Peace (MS 1052)
- The Witch's Song (MS 1053)
- The Mother (MS 1054)
- Sunset from Ossian (MS 1055)
- Greenford Lane (MS 1056)
- Sweet day so cool! (MS 1057)
- A Wreath of a Hundred Roses (MS 1744)
- 'Romance' from the Cornet Concerto (XX(164601.1))
- Overture to The Golden Dawn (XX(164602.1))
- Nordisa (XX(164603.1))
- The Pageant of London (XX(179906.1))
- Sing unto God (XX(179907.1))

Following the death of his son Paul Corder in 1942, Frederick's daughter Dolly destroyed those of her father's and brother's music manuscripts that were in her possession.

== Bibliography ==
Selected writings:

- Corder, Frederick The Orchestra and how to write for it, 1895. ISBN 978-1-104-50078-8
- Corder, Frederick Modern Composition, 1909. ISBN 1-140-35011-0
- Corder, Frederick A History of the Royal Academy of Music from 1822–1922, 1922.
- Corder, Frederick Ferencz (François) Liszt, 1925. ISBN 0-404-12888-2

== See also ==
See: List of music students by teacher: C to F#Frederick Corder.
