= Macek =

Macek is a surname. Notable people with the name include:

- Adolf Macek (1939–1993), Austrian footballer
- Bernhard A. Macek (born 1975), Austrian historian
- Brooks Macek (born 1992), Canadian-German ice hockey player
- Carl Macek (1951–2010), American writer and anime pioneer
- Don Macek (born 1954), American football player
- Michal Macek (born 1981), Czech footballer
- Miroslav Macek (1944–2024), Czech author and politician, deputy prime minister of Czechoslovakia
- Richard Macek (1948–1987), American serial killer
- Roman Macek (born 1997), Czech football player

== See also ==
- Maček
- Mašek
- Maçek
