= My Life Among the Serial Killers =

Book by Helen Morrison

My Life Among the Serial Killers: Inside the Minds of the World's Most Notorious Murderers
- Author: Helen Morrison, Harold Goldberg
- Language: English
- Publisher: HarperCollins
- Publication date: 2004
- ISBN: 0-06-052407-3

My Life Among the Serial Killers: Inside the Minds of the World's Most Notorious Murderers is a book written by Helen Morrison and Harold Goldberg. It presents the cases of ten serial killers, and touches on many more. Morrison spent hundreds of hours in face-to-face interviews, over many years, with several of the subjects. She uses the individual stories to explain and put forth her ideas on what makes a serial killer. The book has received criticism for being factually inaccurate on several topics.

== The cases ==
Morrison begins her story in the early 1970s, when psychiatry and law enforcement had a very different view of these types of crimes. At that time, the term serial killer hadn't been coined. She was initially asked by the FBI to help with interrogating Richard Macek who was suspected of several murders, of which Macek claimed no memory. One of the murders had been attributed to Richard Milone, who spent many years wrongfully incarcerated. Morrison also recounts the difficulties professional women faced working with male-dominated law enforcement at that time. This began her thirty-year research on serial killers.

The cases she reviews in detail are:

- Richard Macek
- Ed Gein
- John Wayne Gacy
- Peter Sutcliffe
- Wayne Williams
- Bobby Joe Long
- Robert Berdella
- Michael Lee Lockhart
- Fred West
- Marcelo Costa de Andrade
- Gary Ridgway
- Ben Legaspi

Morrison uses the story of each serial killer to lay a basis for her theory of why they murder, making frequent comparisons and forays into unrelated cases to illustrate similarities between serial killers' personalities and their lack of motives.

== Serial killer traits ==
The recurring characteristic serial killers share, Morrison contends, is the emotional age of an infant. Serial killers lack a coherent personality and are missing large parts of their humanity. They are generally charismatic and able to fit in by learning to behave as normal people do, while lacking the empathy most normal people possess. Most serial killers are fluent liars, often protest against the injustice of their incarceration and are unable to understand that they did anything wrong. They have a fractured psyche which is incapable of connecting their crimes with the consequences, and often proclaim no memory of the murders. She also notes frequent instances of hypochondria among serial killers.

Morrison's list of serial killer traits include:

- No understandable motive for killing
- No personality structure, no personality development over time
- They are not psychopaths; in some ways they lack self-control, and the ability to think and feel
- Most are above average intelligence
- They are psychologically incomplete human beings, but learn to act as though they are
- Not all have been sexually or physically abused
- They are uncontrollably addicted to killing
- They occur in all societies
- Serial killing has occurred throughout history

Morrison also notes a remarkable lack of substance abuse in serial killers.

== Insanity defense ==
Morrison argues that most serial killers should not be counted guilty of their crimes by reason of insanity; she contends that they are incapable of understanding the evil of their actions despite being, in many cases, highly functioning individuals in society. She describes the mind of a serial killer as flying through life with large blind spots and missing pieces of what it means to be human, and claims that these people are untreatable because they are missing the parts that need treatment.

== Morrison's theory of why people become serial killers ==
Morrison disagrees with or downplays theories that attribute serial killing to complex psychological motives such as suffering child abuse, which is not a consistent factor. She contends that serial killers are so lacking in emotional development that they have no capacity for complex emotional motives.

The book presents various facts, perceptions and descriptions of serial killers in a diffused way and ties the ideas together at the end while presenting the theory that the origin of a serial killer's behavior is genetic. An illustrative example notes that serial killers experience profound physiological events during their crimes that are related to the hypothalamus and that the serial killer's lack of emotion has a similar connection to the hypothalamus. Morrison also describes how serial killers' crimes are similar to drug addiction.

== Criticism ==
Neuropsychiatrist Rachael Bell compiled a list of common complaints against Morrison and her theories:

- Morrison uses "unsubstantiated myths" in her work, most notably in a section where she reviews historical cases of serial killings, such as those of Elizabeth Bathory.
- Although Morrison claims that serial killers have "irresistible impulses," she is unable to reconcile these impulses with the extremely methodical manner in which they find and dispose of victims.
- Morrison does not use a large enough sample; Bell commented that she has found no proof that Morrison actually conducted in-depth interviews with 80 killers.

An investigative piece written by Cliff Doerkson for the Chicago Reader alleges that Morrison's book is inconsistent with accepted fact and with itself. Among other criticisms, Doerkson offers these:

- Morrison uses an idiosyncratic definition of the term "serial killer" as requiring seven victims, which excludes some of her own examples, such as Ed Gein (2 known victims). Most accepted definitions require only 2 or 3 victims.
- Morrison claims that there are no female serial killers. Most experts recognize that, though fewer in number than male serial killers, there are in fact female serial killers, and that women such as Aileen Wuornos and Jane Toppan qualify.
- Morrison argues that serial killers are not motivated by sexual urges. It is recognized by nearly all other experts in the field that this is not the case, and that lust is a very common motive for serial killers.
- Morrison states that "no serial murderers are addicted to drugs, drink, or even smoking." There are multiple known instances of serial killers using drugs or alcohol. John Wayne Gacy was known to smoke marijuana, Jeffrey Dahmer was an alcoholic and Richard Ramirez was addicted to multiple illicit substances ranging from cocaine to methamphetamine.

Doerkson further argues that Morrison's theories of a genetic cause for the impulse to serial murder are insufficiently rigorous and not supported by existing scientific evidence. He additionally follows Bell in questioning Morrison's claim to have interviewed over 80 serial killers, when even an extremely significant expert in the field of serial homicide such as Robert Ressler has only interviewed roughly 40. The piece also includes interviews with several law enforcement professionals who were featured in Morrison's book, each of whom claim that Morrison has misrepresented some of the events in the book.

== See also ==
- List of serial killers by country

== Sources ==
- Morrison, Helen, MD.; Goldberg, Harold (2004). My Life Among the Serial Killers, Inside the Minds of the World's Most Notorious Murderers. HarperCollins. ISBN 0-06-052407-3.
