= Clara Colby =

Clara Colby may refer to:

- Clara Bewick Colby, (1846-1916), British-American lecturer, newspaper publisher and correspondent, women's rights activist, and suffragist leader
- Clara Ellinore Colby (1859-1941), American pianist, soprano, and music educator
