= Maček =

Maček is a surname. Notable people with the name include:

- Borut Maček (born 1966), Slovenian handball coach
- Boštjan Maček (born 1979), Slovenian sport shooter
- Ivan Maček (1908–1993), Slovenian communist politician
- Ivo Maček (1914–2002), Croatian pianist
- Vladko Maček (1879–1964), Croatian politician
- Vlasta Maček (born 1952), Croatian chess master

== See also ==
- Macek
- Mašek
