= Mašek =

Mašek (feminine: Mašková) is a Czech surname. It originated as a diminutive of the surname Mach or some of the Czech given names starting with Ma- (Martin, Matěj, Matyáš, etc.). The surname was documented already in 1459. Notable people with the surname include:

- Beverly Masek (born 1963), American dog sled racer and businesswoman
- Dominik Mašek (born 1995), Czech footballer
- Hana Mašková (1949–1972), Czech figure skater
- Ivan Mašek (1948–2019), Czech politician
- Jiří Mašek (born 1978), Czech footballer
- Kamilo Mašek (1831–1859), Slovenian composer
- Karel Vítězslav Mašek (1865–1927), Czech painter
- Kašpar Mašek (1794–1873), Czech-Slovenian composer
- Lukáš Mašek (born 2004), Czech footballer
- Martina Mašková (born 1998), Czech ice hockey player
- Václav Mašek (born 1941), Czech footballer
- Vincenc Mašek (1755–1831), Czech composer and pianist
