= Zvíkovec =

- Market town
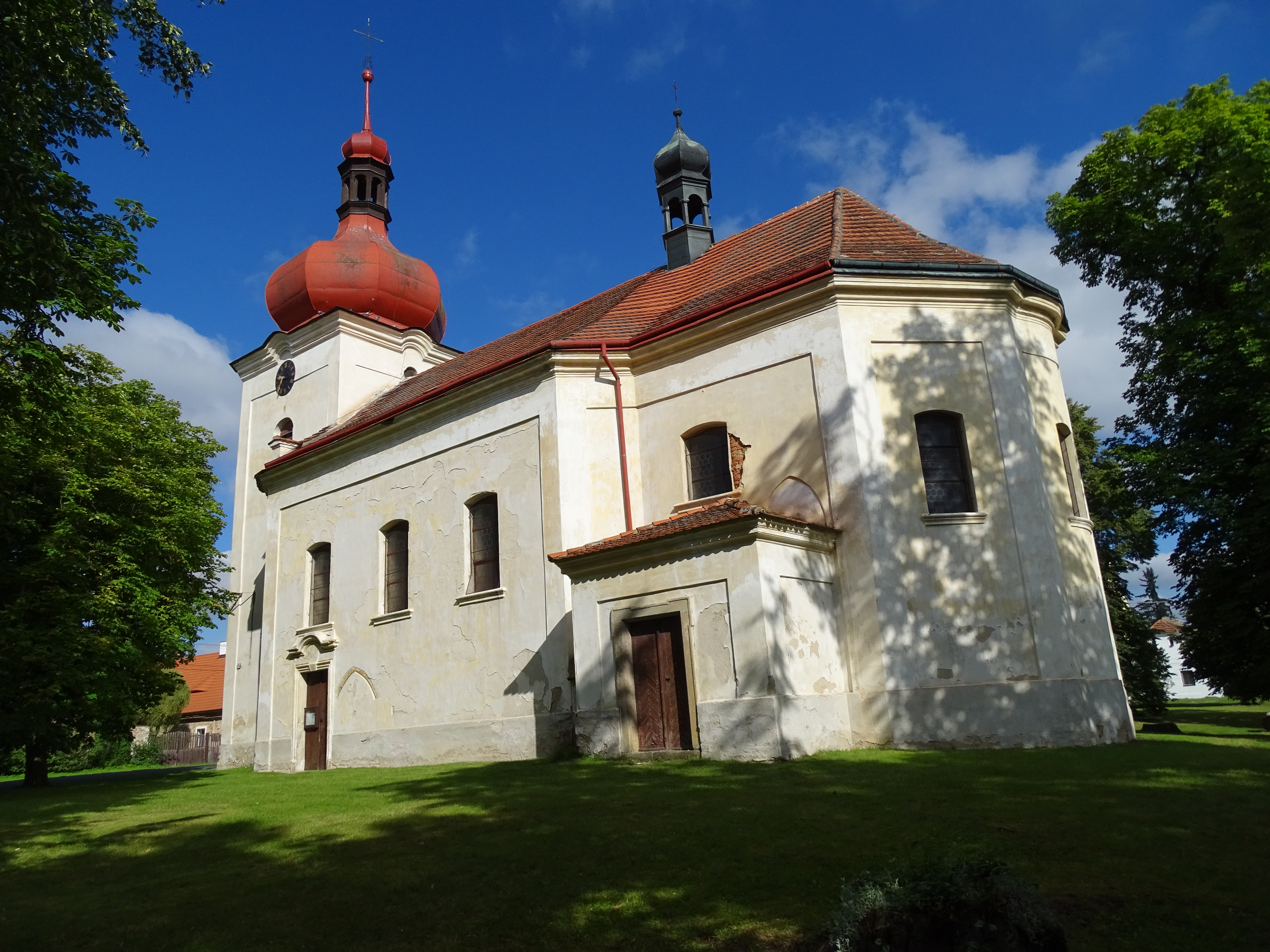
- Church of the Assumption of the Virgin Mary

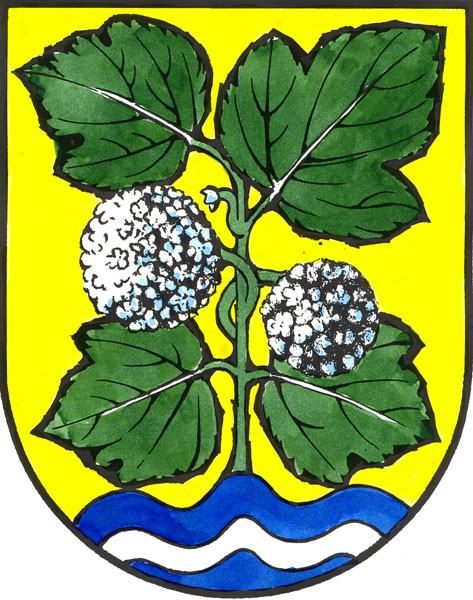
- Flag Coat of arms

- Location in the Czech Republic
- Coordinates: 49°57′15″N 13°41′19″E
- Country: Czech Republic
- Region: Plzeň
- District: Rokycany
- First mentioned: 1229

Area
  - Total: 3.95 km^{2} (1.53 sq mi)
- Elevation: 323 m (1,060 ft)

Population (2026-01-01)
  - Total: 201
  - Density: 50.9/km^{2} (132/sq mi)
- Time zone: UTC+1 (CET)
  - Summer (DST): UTC+2 (CEST)
- Postal code: 338 08
- Website: www.zvikovec.cz

Zvíkovec (Czech pronunciation: [ˈzviːkovɛts]; German: Swikowetz) is a market town in Rokycany District in the Plzeň Region of the Czech Republic. It has about 200 inhabitants.

== Etymology ==
The initial name of the settlement was Zvíkov. The name was derived either from the personal name Zviek, meaning "Zviek's", or from the Old Czech word zviek ('sound'). The name Zvíkovec is a diminutive of Zvíkov and has been used since the 14th century.

== Geography ==
Zvíkovec is located about 24 kilometres (15 mi) north of Rokycany and 31 km (19 mi) northeast of Plzeň. It lies in the Plasy Uplands. The highest point is the Střežatka hill at 434 m (1,424 ft) above sea level. The municipality is situated on the right bank of the Berounka River. The eastern part of the municipal territory extends into the Křivoklátsko Protected Landscape Area.

== History ==
The first written mention of Zvíkovec is from 1229. It was owned by various lesser noblemen. It is not known when Zvíkovec was promoted to market town, but in 1543 at the latest.

== Demographics ==
Historical population

Year	Pop.	±%
1869	507	—
1880	477	−5.9%
1890	426	−10.7%
1900	462	+8.5%
1910	446	−3.5%

Year	Pop.	±%
1921	421	−5.6%
1930	360	−14.5%
1950	265	−26.4%
1961	282	+6.4%
1970	246	−12.8%

Year	Pop.	±%
1980	225	−8.5%
1991	183	−18.7%
2001	188	+2.7%
2011	197	+4.8%
2021	204	+3.6%

Source: Censuses

== Transport ==
There are no railways or major roads passing through the municipality.

== Sights ==
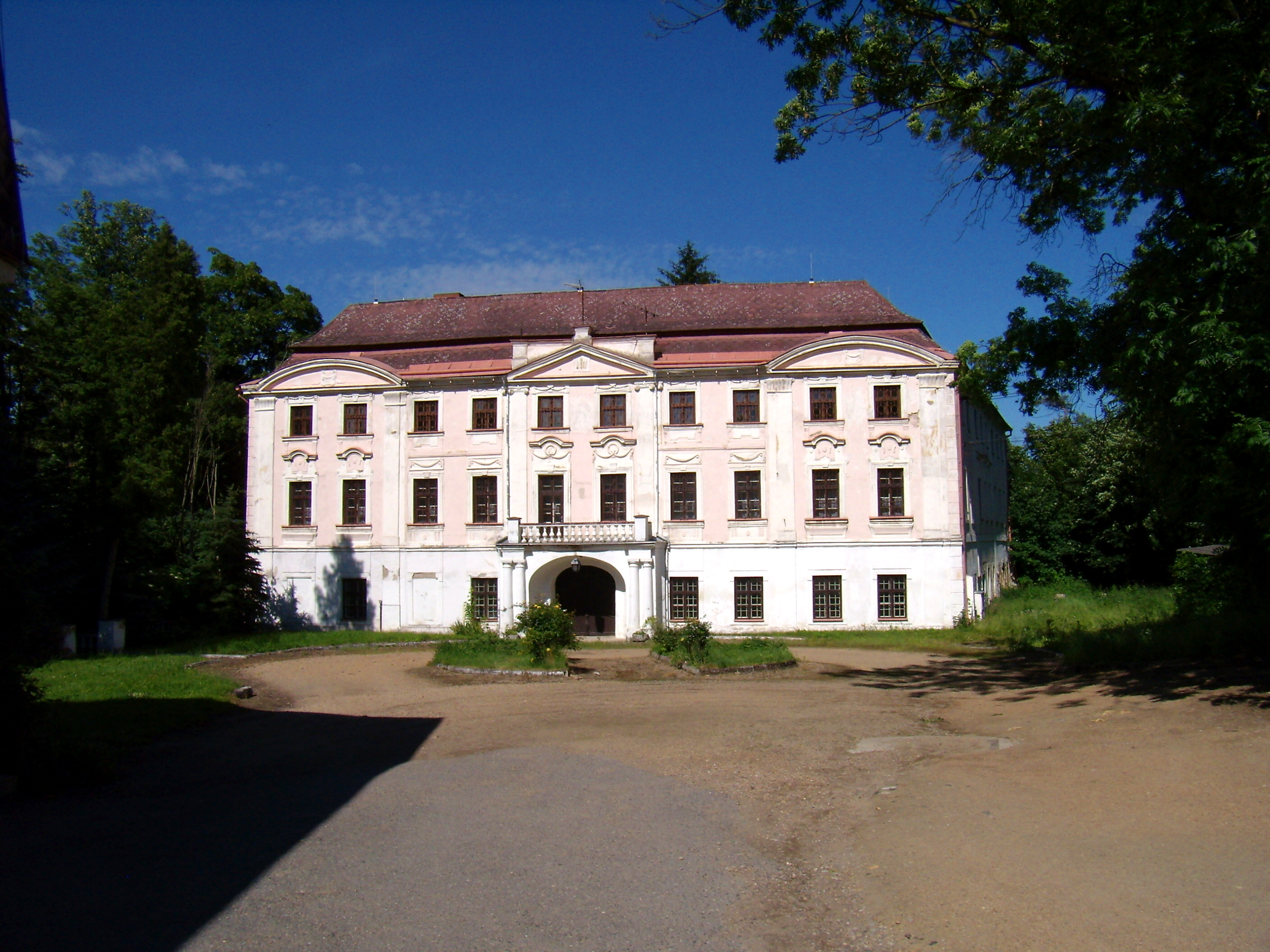
Zvíkovec Castle

The main landmark of Zvíkovec is the Church of the Assumption of the Virgin Mary. It was built in the Gothic style in the second half of the 14th century. At the end of the 17th century and in the second half of the 18th century, it was rebuilt in the Baroque style.

The Zvíkovec Castle was built in the Baroque style in 1753, on the site of an older fortress. At the end of the 18th century, it was rebuilt in the Neoclassical style. Today the building is privately owned and is used as an institute of social welfare.

== Notable people ==
- Vincenc Mašek (1755–1831), composer and pianist
