= Amalie Mauthner =

Austro-Hungarian pianist and composer (1832–1951)

- Born: 1832; Pest, Kingdom of Hungary
- Died: 15 December 1915 (aged 82–83); Vienna, Austria-Hungary
- Resting place: Wiener Zentralfriedhof
- Spouses: Leopold Rawack (m. 1853; div. 1861) Julius Epstein (m. 1865)
- Musical career
- Occupations: Musician, composer, educator
- Instrument: Pianoforte

Amalie Mauthner (m. Epstein; 1832 – 15 December 1915) was an Austro-Hungarian pianist and composer.

== Biography ==
Mauthner was born in Pest to Jewish parents Zacharias and Theresia Mauthner. She received her early musical training in Vienna from Anton Halm, and began appearing in concert at the age of 12. By the mid-1840s she had begun performing in concerts across Central Europe.

She married affluent Silesian merchant and amateur violinist Leopold Rawack in 1853, and the couple moved to Sydney amid the Australian gold rush. A daughter was born after three years of marriage, but died in infancy in February 1858. Mauthner took up work as a music teacher, joined the Sydney Philharmonic Society, and performed in several highly praised concerts as a soloist. Her only surviving composition, the waltz Novara-Klänge, was published in Germany in 1860 in celebration of the SMS Novora's visit to Australia.

By 1861 she and Rawack had divorced, and she returned to Vienna that February. She married pianist Julius Epstein in 1865, with whom she raised three children.
