= Julius Epstein (pianist) =

Croatian-Jewish pianist (1832–1926)

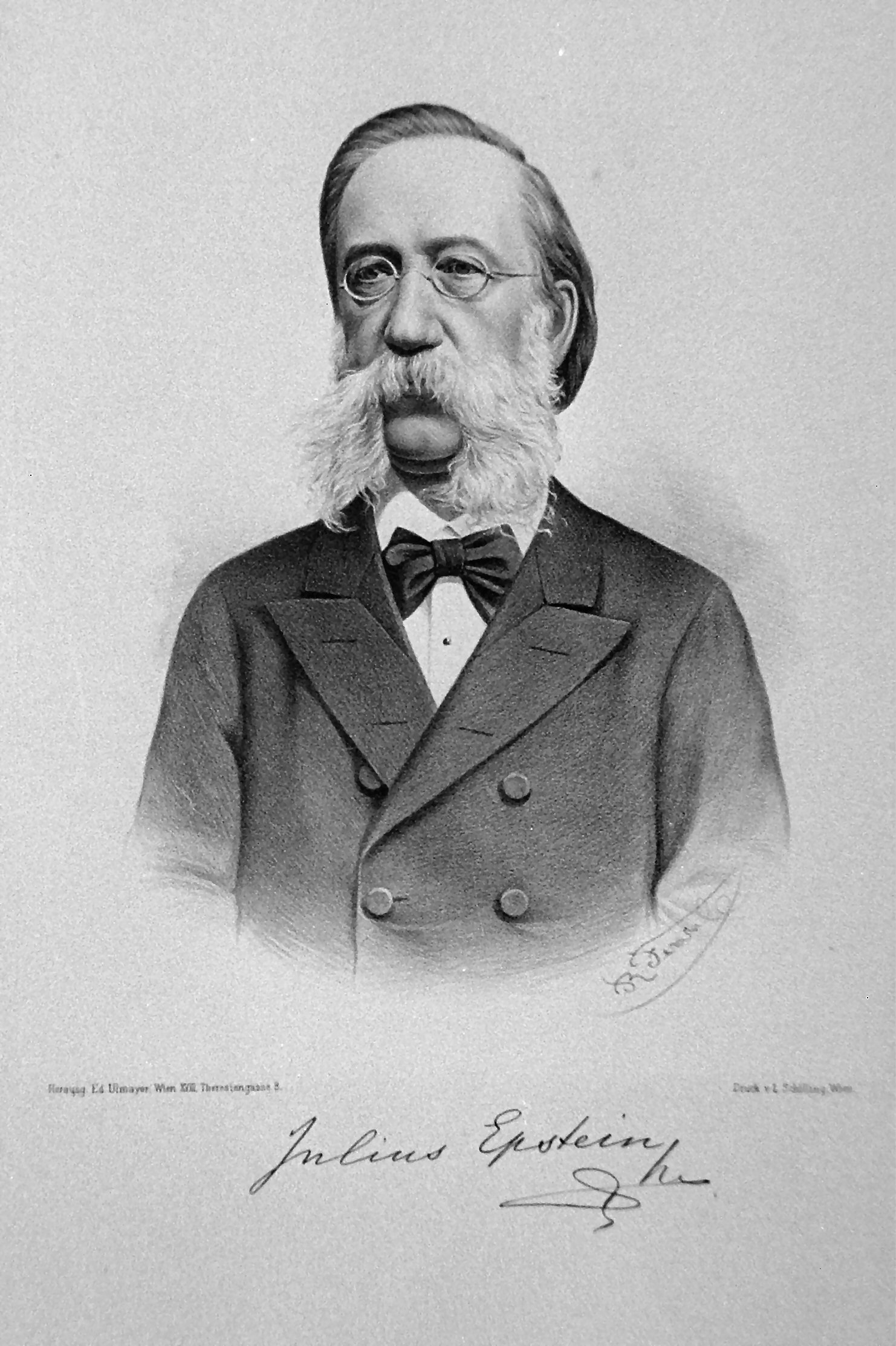
- Born: 7 August 1832; Zagreb, Austro-Hungarian Empire, (now Croatia)
- Died: 3 March 1926 (aged 93); Vienna, Austria
- Occupation: Pianist
- Spouse: Amalija (née Mautner) Epstein
- Children: Richard; Rudolfine; Eugénie

Julius Epstein (7 August 1832 – 3 March 1926) was a Croatian-Jewish pianist.

== Biography ==
Epstein was born in Zagreb, Croatia. He was married to Amalija (née Mautner) Epstein with whom he had a son Richard Epstein, a notable Zagreb pianist and music pedagogue.

Epstein was a pupil at Agram of the choir-director Vatroslav Lichtenegger, and in Vienna of Johann Rufinatscha (composition) and Anton Halm (pianoforte). He made his début in 1852, and soon became one of the most popular pianists and teachers in Vienna.

From 1867 to 1901, Epstein was a professor of piano at the Vienna Conservatory, where Ignaz Brüll, Marcella Sembrich, Mathilde Kralik, Gustav Mahler, Benito Bersa, Clara E. Thoms, and Richard Robert were among his pupils.

Epstein edited Beethoven's piano sonatas, Mendelssohn's "Sämmtliche Klavierwerke" and Schubert's "Kritisch Durchgesehene Gesammtausgabe", among others. He died, aged 93, in Vienna.

His two daughters Rudolfine Epstein (cellist) and Eugénie Epstein (violinist) went on a very successful concert tour through Germany and Austria during the 1876–1877 season. His son Richard Epstein was also a professor of piano at the Vienna Conservatorium. Epstein was a good friend of Johannes Brahms, Ferdo Livadić and mentor of Gustav Mahler.

In 1846 Epstein founded, together with his brothers Jakov (Jacques) and Vatroslav (Ignaz), the benefactor society "Društvo čovječnosti" Zagreb (Humanity society) which aided the poor and needy across the Kingdom of Croatia-Slavonia and the Kingdom of Dalmatia.

The Viennese piano teacher Marie Kermer (1882−1957), aunt of the German art historian Wolfgang Kermer, was a student of Julius Epstein at the Conservatory of the Gesellschaft der Musikfreunde in Vienna.

In 1902, Epstein received the Knight's Cross of the Order of Franz Joseph to commemorate his seventieth birthday.

== Sources ==
- Kolar Dimitrijević, Mira (1998). Društvo čovječnosti 1846–1946. Zagreb: Židovska općina Zagreb, Kulturno društvo "Miroslav Šalom Freiberger". ISBN 953-97067-3-4.
- Kraus, Ognjen (1998). Dva stoljeća povijesti i kulture Židova u Zagrebu i Hrvatskoj. Zagreb: Židovska općina Zagreb. ISBN 953-96836-2-9.
