= Anna Sachse-Hofmeister =

Austrian opera singer

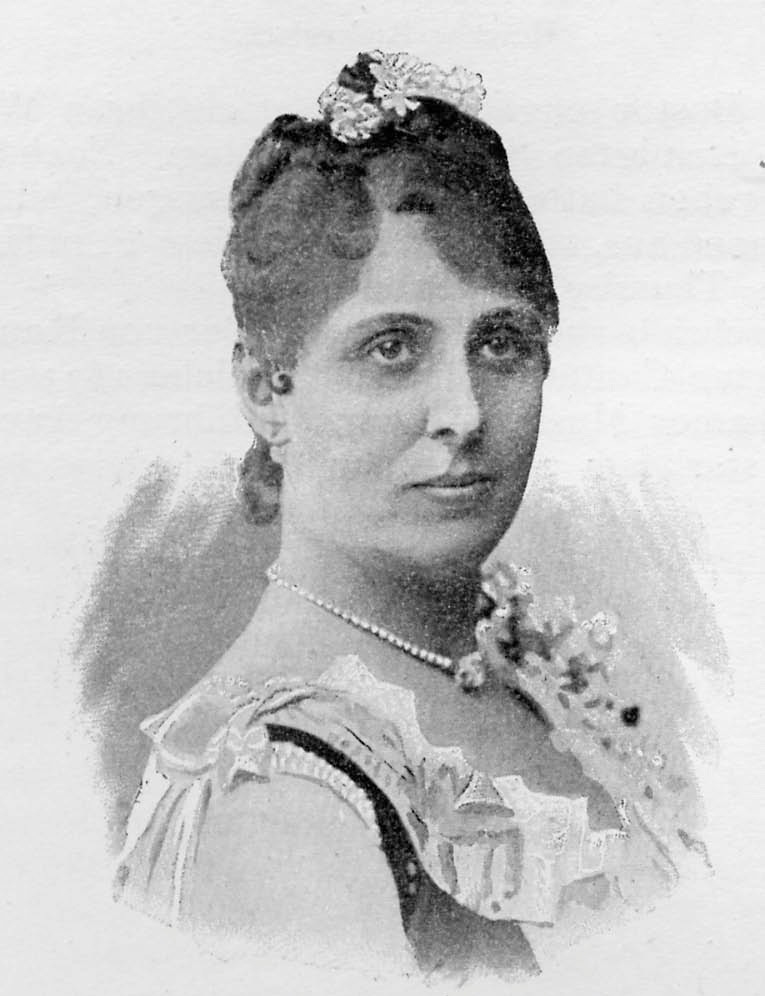
Portrait by Albert Henry Payne

Anna Sachse-Hofmeister (26 July 1850 – 15 November 1904) was an Austrian operatic soprano, appearing at the Berlin Court Opera and other opera houses in Germany.

== Life ==
She was born in Gumpoldskirchen in Lower Austria in 1850, where her father Franz Hofmeister was a schoolteacher and director of the choir of St Michael's Church in the town. She had early lessons in singing and violin from her father, then from 1864 to 1866 attended Vienna Conservatory, studying violin from Georg Hellmesberger Sr. and singing from Adele Passy-Cornet; she afterwards trained further with Heinrich Proch, conductor of the Vienna Court Opera.

Her debut was as Leonora in Verdi's Il trovatore in Olmutz (present-day Olomouc) in 1871. In that year she was engaged as a member of the opera at Würzburg; in 1872 she joined the Alte Oper in Frankfurt, leaving in 1876 to join the Berlin Court Opera.

She married in 1878 Max Sachse (1847–1913), a tenor singer. She sang at the Royal Opera House in Dresden from 1878 to 1880, appearing with Marcella Sembrich and Emil Goetze, and at the Leipzig Opera from 1880 to 1882, appearing with Hedwig Reicher-Kindermann; then returned to Berlin until retirement from the stage in 1888. She died in Berlin in 1904.

Sachse-Hofmeister's repertoire included operas of Mozart, and leading roles in Beethoven's Fidelio, Weber's Euryanthe and Verdi's Aida. In the operas of Richard Wagner, her roles included Elsa in Lohengrin, Elisabeth in Tannhäuser and Sieglinde in Die Walküre; Wagner called her the Sieglinde of his dreams. She appeared in London in Wagner's opera cycle Der Ring des Nibelungen in 1884.
