= Blagoje Bersa =

Croatian composer

Benito Bersa

Blagoje Bersa (born as Benito Bersa, 21 December 1873 – 1 January 1934) was a Croatian musical composer of substantial influence.

Bersa was born in Dubrovnik. He studied in Zagreb with Ivan Zajc and at the Vienna Conservatory with Robert Fuchs and Julius Epstein. In 1919 he returned to Zagreb, where he worked as a composition teacher at the music academy. He remained there until his death.

== Works ==
=== Operas ===
- Der Eisenhammer (Oganj), Opera, 1911
- Der Schuster von Delft (Postolar od Delfta), Opera after Hans Christian Andersen, 1914.
- Jelka, Opera, 1901

=== Popular works ===
- Sablasti (Apparitions) & Sunčana polja (Sunny Fields), symphonic diptych
- Sinfonia tragica "Quattro ricordi della mia vita" (Tragic symphony - Four memories of my life) in C-minor

1. Overture drammatica (Dramatic Overture), Op. 25a
2. Idillio "Il giorno delle mie nozze" (Idyll - The Day of my Wedding), Op. 25b
3. Capriccio-Scherzo, Op. 25c
4. Finale "Vita nuova" (Finale - New Life), Op. 25d (unfinished; piano sketch. Orchestrated by his student Zvonimir Bradić, who Bersa gave the exclusive right to do so before he died)

- Hamlet, symphonic poem
- Povero Tonin, elegy for violin and piano
- Andante sostenuto for orchestra

=== Piano works (not a complete list) ===
(with Opus number)

- Valzer in A Major, Op. 3
- Minuet, Op. 11
- Theme & Variations, Op. 15
- Bagatella, Op. 16
- Rondo-Polonaise, Op. 18
- Piano Sonata No. 1 in C Major, Op. 19
- Piano Sonata No. 2 in F Minor, Op. 20
- Marcia trionfale, Op. 24
- Fantaisie-Impromptu, Op. 27
- Ora triste, Op. 37
- Notturno, Op. 38
- Fantasia breve, Op. 56
- Venecijanska barkarola, Op. 58
- Riso e lamento, Op. 63
- Ballade in D Minor, Op. 65
- Novelette, Op. 69
- Valse-Mélancolique in A minor, Op. 76 (NB: there are two works published as Opus 76. In spite of their similar titles, they are not related)
- Mélancolie in F-sharp minor, Op. 76 (NB: there are two works published as Opus 76. In spite of their similar titles, they are not related)

(without Opus number)

- Ballabile
- Bizarna serenada
- Na žalu
- Serenade-Barcarolle
- Stari mornar priča
- Trois Airs de ballet ("Po načinu starih")
