= Johann Rufinatscha =

Austrian composer, theorist and music teacher (1812–1893)

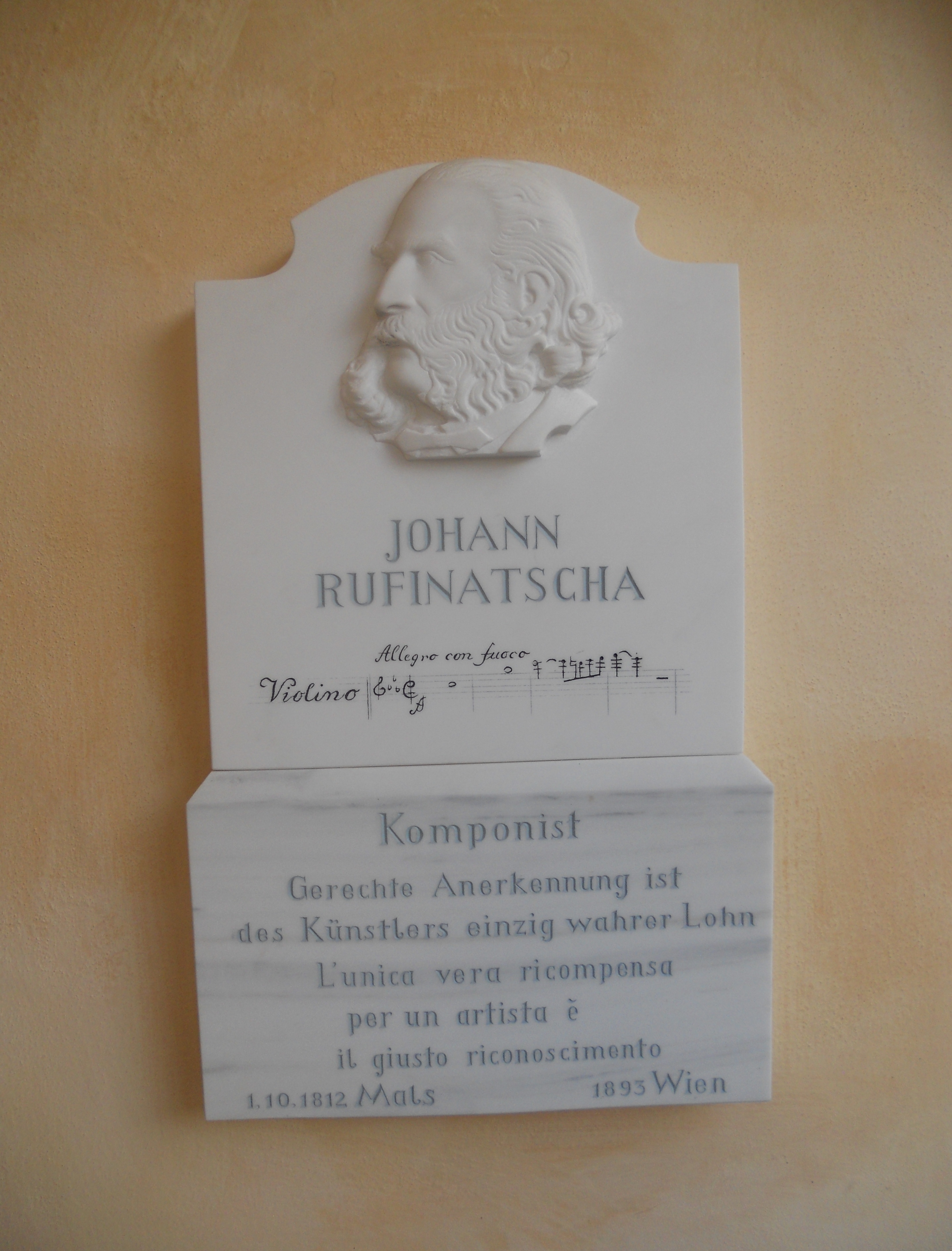
Johann Rufinatscha.

Johann Rufinatscha (1 October 1812 – 25 May 1893) was an Austrian composer, theorist and music teacher.

== Life ==
Rufinatscha was born in 1812 in Mals (Austria, now in the Italian province of South Tyrol). At the age of 14 he came to Innsbruck, where he studied the piano, violin, and musical study at the conservatory. After that he settled in Vienna, where he would remain for the rest of his life.

During his lifetime he was most prominent as a teacher of piano and harmony in Vienna. Rufinatscha seems to have spent most of his life teaching rather than composing actively, which would explain why he composed relatively few pieces. He knew Johannes Brahms and composed a number of works (including several symphonies) during the period in which Brahms refused to publish any symphonic works. While predicted by contemporaries to become a major composer of his day, this did not turn out to be the case, and as such he is still relatively obscure. However, as a music teacher he was influential; among his pupils were composers such as Ignaz Brüll and Julius Epstein. He died in 1893 in Vienna.

Rufinatscha is recognised as one of Tyrol's most important composers of the 19th century. His works can be said to form a connection between those of Franz Schubert and Anton Bruckner. Shortly before his death Rufinatscha decided to donate the manuscripts of his compositions to the Tyrolean provincial museum, where they remain to this day. In the past few years some of his works have been recorded on CD, and are for sale from the Museum's shop.

== Compositions ==
Rufinatscha appears to have composed 5 full symphonies and one three-movement symphonic torso. The following is a list of his known compositions:

=== Orchestral works ===
- Symphony No. 1 in D major "Mein erstes Studium" (composed: Innsbruck, 1834; performed: Innsbruck, 1844)
- Symphony No. 2 in E♭ major (composed: Vienna, 1840; performed: Vienna, Feb.1844)
- Symphony No. 3 in C minor (string parts only have survived; composed: Vienna 1846; performed: Vienna, September 1846; wind/brass parts reconstructed by Michael F.P.Huber for first modern performances on 24 and 25 November 2012)
- Symphony No. 4 in B minor (formerly known as No.5 - composed: Vienna 1846; performed: Vienna, October 1846?)
- Symphony No. 5 in D major (formerly known as No.6 - composed: Vienna 1850; performed: Vienna, Easter Monday 1852?)

Notes: (i) The work formerly identified as 'Symphony No. 3 in F major - lost' never existed. Instead, it seems that the work in F major is actually a concert aria with an opening orchestral section in the same key (which was taken to be the opening of an unidentified symphony). (ii) The work formerly identified as 'Symphony No. 4 in C minor' (1846 - of which only the piano four-hands adaptation of its three extant movements survives) is now properly identified as 'Three Movements of a Symphony in C major (not minor): presumed never orchestrated'. It is undated. It was erroneously identified as the Symphony in C minor now known as No.3 (above).

- Piano Concerto (1850): scored for both orchestra and piano four-hands
- Serenade for Strings (nd)
- Concert Overture in C major
- Innerer Kampf ("Inner Struggle"), orchestral overture (nd)
- Die Braut von Messina ("The Bride of Messina"), orchestral overture (1850)
- Dramatische Overture (1878)

=== Chamber music ===
- String Quartet in E♭ major (1850)
- String Quartet in G major (1870)
- Piano Trio in A♭ major (1868): third movement seems to be a reworking of the 2nd movement of the Piano Concerto.
- Piano Quartet in C minor (1836)
- Piano Quartet in A♭ major (1870): the first and the last movements possibly are reworkings of earlier compositions.

=== Instrumental works ===
- Sonata for Piano 4-hands in D minor (1850)
- Piano Sonata No. 2 in C major, Op.7 (1855)
- 6 Character Pieces, Op.14 (by 1871)
- Piano Sonata in D minor, Op.18 (1880)

== Recordings ==
The Tyrolean State Museum has released multiple CDs with works by Rufinatscha. Among them are the extant symphonies (nos. 1, 2, 3, 4 [5] and 5 [6], the Piano Trio, the String Quartets in E♭ major and G major, and the four-hand reduction of the Piano Concerto. As of November 2009 the full orchestra version of the Piano Concerto became available, along with two concert overtures.

A series of CDs of Rufinatscha's orchestral music is now being planned by Chandos Records, of which the first - the 5th [6th] Symphony and the overture The Bride of Messina - has now (March 2011) been issued.
