= Friederike Proch Benesch =

Czech pianist and composer (1805–1872)

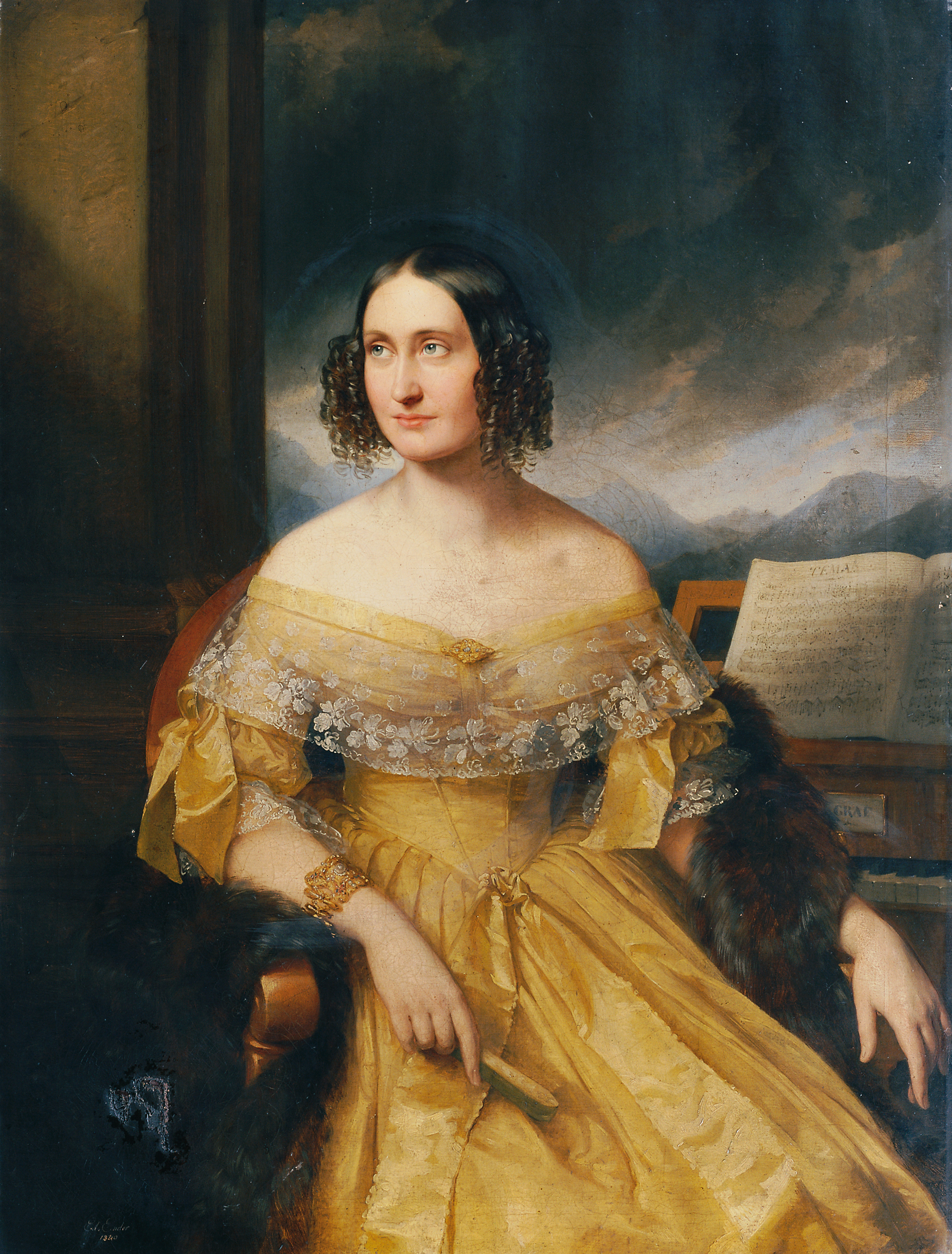
- Her portrait, painted in 1840 by the Austrian painter Eduard Ender; held in the Österreichische Galerie Belvedere.
- Born: Friderica Ernestina Theresia Proch; March 4, 1805; Vienna, Austrian Empire
- Died: February 23, 1872 (aged 66); Vienna, Austria-Hungary
- Occupations: Pianist, piano teacher, composer
- Relatives: Vincenc Mašek (grandfather); Gašpar Mašek (uncle); Heinrich Proch (brother); Kamilo Mašek (cousin)

Friderica Ernestina Theresia Proch Benesch, also known as Friederike Proch Benesch, (4 March 1805 – 23 February 1872), was a Czech pianist, piano teacher, and composer. She had a long concert career in Vienna, and for several years she was also active in what is now Slovenia. She was the first known woman to perform her own composition publicly in Ljubljana, and the first known woman to teach piano privately in Ljubljana in an official capacity (outside school institutions).

== Childhood and education ==
She was born on 4 March 1805 in Vienna into a distinguished Czech family. (Note: According to some sources, she was born in 1904.) Her mother was the music teacher Vinzenzia Maschek (1782–1849), daughter of the composer Vincenc Mašek, and her father was the lawyer Ernst Proch (1778–1856). Among her siblings was her younger brother Heinrich Proch, a composer. In 1909 she moved with her family to Pottendorf in Lower Austria, about forty kilometres from Vienna. Her first piano teacher was her mother.

As a child, she organized private concerts with her mother, sisters and brothers; these were attended by members of the Esterházy noble family and prominent local intellectuals, and on one occasion also the young composer Franz Liszt. In 1819 she moved with her family to Wiener Neustadt. There she first studied piano and composition with the Austrian composer Simon Sechter (1788–1867), and later composition and harmony with the Austrian organist, conductor, and composer Anton Herzog (1771–1850).

== Work ==
=== In Ljubljana ===
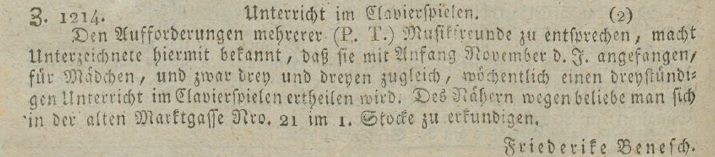
Her advertisement for piano lessons in the (Intelligenzblatt zur) Laibacher Zeitung, dated 17 October 1823

In August 1822 she appeared publicly for the first time in Vienna and was well received. She performed the then-very-popular Piano Concerto No. 2 in A minor by Johann Nepomuk Hummel. That same year she met the Czech violinist and composer Joseph Benesch (1795–1873), who became the violin teacher of her brother Heinrich. In April 1832 she married him and moved with him to Ljubljana (Laibach). There, her uncle Caspar Maschek, also known as Gašpar Mašek, together with his wife Amalie Horný Maschek, a concert singer, was among the leading musicians. Between 1823 and 1826 she appeared seven times on the stage of Ljubljana's Philharmonic Society, either as a soloist or as an accompanist. She also performed several times with her husband.

On 30 May 1823 in Ljubljana, she publicly performed with the Philharmonic Society orchestra her Variationen fiir das Piano-Forte mit Orchester-Begleitung (Variations for piano and orchestra), and thereby became the first known woman to perform her own composition publicly in Ljubljana. In 1924, at only nineteen years of age, she became an honorary member of the Ljubljana Philharmonic. (Note: According to some sources, she was twenty years old.) From 1923 until leaving Ljubljana she taught piano privately. In this way she became the first known woman in Ljubljana to teach piano privately in an official capacity (outside school institutions, such as the Ursuline schools). She published advertisements for lessons in the newspaper Laibacher Zeitung. In 1927 she and her husband gave several concerts in Prague, for which she received much praise in the newspapers. During her stay in Ljubljana she gave birth to two daughters and a son. For each birth she travelled to Vienna and later returned to Ljubljana.

=== In Vienna ===
At the end of 1828 she moved with her family to Vienna, where she continued her concert career, teaching, and composing. After moving to Vienna she gave birth to another daughter, who died in childhood, and a son. Soon after the move she and her husband gave several concerts in Vienna. In the following years she performed frequently in Vienna and in Wiener Neustadt. She performed mainly works by Carl Maria von Weber, Henri Herz, Friedrich Kalkbrenner, Ferdinand Ries and Theodor Döhler. She appeared several times at the Burgtheater. For her concerts she received much praise in newspapers such as Der Sammler, Wiener Zeitschrift für Kunst, Literatur, Theater und Mode, Österreichischer Zuschauer, Der Humorist, and others. She collaborated and performed with various Viennese musicians, including the harpist Therese Heilingmeyer, but above all with her husband and her brother. In Vienna she composed several works for piano.

== Later life and death ==
In her late forties she stopped giving concerts. She died of abdominal degeneration on 23 February 1872 in Vienna.

== Awards ==
- Honorary membership of the Philharmonic Society in Ljubljana (1824)
