= Vincenc Mašek =

Vincenc Václav Mašek (sometimes called Vincent Maschek or Vincenzo Maschek; 5 April 1755 – 15 November 1831) was a Czech composer of classical music, pianist and virtuoso of the glass harmonica.

Mašek composed two Czech operas, symphonies, piano concertos, chamber music, masses, propers, cantatas, piano sonatas, works for the glass harmonica, and songs.

== Life ==
Mašek was born on 5 April 1755 in Zvíkovec, Kingdom of Bohemia.

He was introduced to music by his father, Tomáš Mašek, and later studied composition and fortepiano with František Xaver Dušek, and harmony and counterpoint with Josef Seger in Prague.

Under the name Vincenc Mašek, he then toured Germany as a pianist, performing in Berlin, Dresden, Halle, Leipzig, and Hamburg, as well as in Copenhagen, Denmark.

In 1781, he married his pupil, Marie (Johanna) Nepomucena Prauß (1764–1808).

In 1794, Mašek became Kapellmeister at St. Nicholas Church in Prague-Malá Strana, a position he held until his death in 1831. Around the same time, he also became choirmaster at the Church of Our Lady of the Snows in Prague.

Two years later, in 1796, he was commissioned by the Bohemian Estates to compose a cantata, which was performed at the National Theatre in honour of Prince Charles, commander-in-chief of the Austrian armies.

Around 1802, Vincenc Mašek also became a music publisher and owner of a music shop.

He died on 15 November 1831 in Prague.

His brother Pavel Mašek, his sons Albín and Gašpar Mašek, and his grandchildren Friederike Proch Benesch and Heinrich Proch were also composers.

== Works ==
Vincenc Mašek composed two operas, lieder, masses, cantatas, piano concertos, piano sonatas, works for glass harmonica, chamber music and symphonies.

== Reputation, influence and students ==
According to John W. Moore (in 1852), Vincenc Mašek contributed to the improvement of the glass harmonica, which he played masterfully. Also according to Moore, Mašek possessed a special gift for communicating his knowledge, which led him to train a considerable number of excellent students.

In its 1800 edition, the Leipzig periodical Allgemeine musikalische Zeitung described him as a thoughtful and charming composer and the finest pianist.
