= Helen Morrison =

American psychiatrist and writer

Helen Louise Morrison (born July 9, 1942) is an American forensic psychiatrist, writer and profiler. She was born in Greensburg, Pennsylvania, and attended Temple University, the Medical College of Pennsylvania, and the Chicago Institute for Psychoanalysis. Her work involves the psychology of serial killers.

== Works ==
The focus of her research has been to find common personality traits among serial killers. She has published a book, My Life Among the Serial Killers.

Morrison was a witness for the defense at the trial of John Wayne Gacy, testifying that he was legally insane because he was "unable to separate from his mother psychologically" and never developed a separate identity. The jury rejected Gacy's insanity defense and found him guilty. After his execution, Gacy's brain was removed and was in Morrison's possession.
