= Berdella =

- Film poster
- Directed by: Paul South; William Taft
- Written by: William Taft
- Produced by: Paul South; William Taft
- Starring: Seth Correa; Marc Saleme; Vito Spino; Steve Williams
- Narrated by: George Taft
- Cinematography: Rocky Varela
- Edited by: Paul South
- Music by: Topp Boom
- Production companies: Savage Cinema; Northeast Film Group
- Distributed by: Northeast Film Group
- Release dates: 10 September 2009 (Kansas City, Missouri)
- Running time: 83 minutes
- Country: United States
- Language: English

Berdella is a 2009 American horror film written and directed by William Taft and co-directed by Paul South. A limited theatrical release, it is based on the crimes of Robert Berdella, an American serial killer who raped, tortured, and murdered at least six men in Kansas City, Missouri during the 1980s. It stars Seth Correa as Berdella, and co-stars Marc Saleme, Vito Spino, and Steve Williams.

== Plot ==
Beginning in 1984 and ending in 1988, the film follows Robert "Bob" Berdella, a homosexual bazaar owner and sexually sadistic serial killer who is introduced drunkenly bludgeoning Jimmy Hower, a man whom Bob had been holding captive in the basement of his Kansas City home, 4315 Charlotte Street. Bob subsequently goes to work and skims pornographic magazines in the park, returning home afterward to sell drugs to his friend, Larry. Bob then invites over a drug addict and slits the man's throat after he stumbles onto a file about Jimmy.

During a game of poker, Bob serves the other players chili that is implied to contain human remains, and later drugs, sexually assaults, and murders a yard worker named Mike Walton. The next day, Bob masturbates to photographs of his crimes, disposes of Walton's body, and heads out to tend to his shop, leaving a pair of junkies whom he had been counseling alone in his house, which the two ransack, infuriating Bob.

After selling a victim's skull to an oblivious buyer, Bob visits a gay bar, where he entices one of the addicts who had earlier robbed him into returning to 4315 Charlotte Street. There, Bob angrily tortures and mutilates the man, gouging out the junkie's eyes and going on a religious-themed rant before finally suffocating the addict with a plastic bag while repeatedly yelling, "You fucking robbed me!" Bob later bails Larry out of jail, and subjects him to similar torture and mutilation, eventually asphyxiating and decapitating him after lobotomizing him with a power drill and an injection of Drano.

Bob goes on to abduct a prostitute named Cliff, whom he intends to condition into becoming his sex slave, keeping him tied up on the second floor of 4315 Charlotte Street. While at work, Bob begins suffering from chest pains after being attacked by a relative of Jimmy Hower. The film ends with Bob being informed that he will have to close his bazaar, and with Cliff escaping and begging a passing meter man to call 911. A series of intertitles states that Bob was arrested for murder, plea bargained his way out of a death sentence, and died of an apparent heart attack in 1992.

== Cast ==
- Seth Correa as Robert Berdella
- Steve Williams as Larry
- Marc Saleme as Mark
- Vito Spino as Cliff
- Elmer Parker as Jimmy Hower
- Steve Bellinger as Joe
- Rose Marie South as Kathy Greene
- Denise Carroll as Larry's Wife
- Kent Downing as Roger Schelling
- George Taft as Charlie
- Cody Ross as Mike Walton
- Rebecca Scott as Female Customer
- Marcia Trayford as Joe's Wife
- Desiree Brockett as Prostitute
- Rocky Varela as Meter Man

== Release ==
The film had a limited theatrical release in 2009, and was made available on DVD in 2010.

== Reception ==
Dread Central's Erik W. Van Der Wolf awarded the film a score of 3½ out of 5, and concluded, "Berdella is far from perfect and definitely looks like a low budget film in just about every aspect, but that didn't stop Taft and South from delivering something worth watching." Todd Martin of Horror News praised the film's cinematography and Seth Correa's performance, but otherwise found Berdella to be "so-so" and wrote, "while I didn't hate it I still didn't really see anything special about it that would make me want to watch it again either." Writing for The Pitch, Alan Scherstuhl condemned Berdella, deriding its "halfwit script, wretched acting, glib amorality, and inability to establish a clear relationship between the action that takes place in any one scene to whatever happens in the next."
