= Robert Berdella =

American serial killer (1949–1992)

- Berdella in December 1986
- Born: Robert Andrew Berdella Jr. January 31, 1949; Cuyahoga Falls, Ohio, U.S.
- Died: October 8, 1992 (aged 43); Missouri State Penitentiary, Missouri, U.S.
- Other names: The Kansas City Butcher; The Collector
- Motive: Sexual sadism; Possession; Control
- Convictions: First degree murder (2 counts); Second degree murder (4 counts); Selling amphetamines; Sodomy; Assault; Sexual assault
- Penalty: Life imprisonment without parole (1988)

Details
- Victims: 6
- Span of crimes: 1984–1987
- Country: United States
- State: Missouri
- Date apprehended: April 2, 1988
- Imprisoned at: Missouri State Penitentiary, Jefferson City, Missouri, U.S.

Robert Andrew Berdella Jr. (January 31, 1949 – October 8, 1992) was an American serial killer who kidnapped, raped, tortured, and murdered at least six young men after forcing his victims to endure periods of up to six weeks of captivity. His crimes took place in Kansas City, Missouri, between 1984 and 1987.

Describing his murders as being "some of my darkest fantasies becoming my reality", Berdella pleaded guilty and was sentenced to life imprisonment without the possibility of parole for the first-degree murder of one of his victims, Larry Pearson, in August 1988; he would later plead guilty to one further charge of first-degree murder and four charges of second-degree murder in December 1988. He died of a heart attack while incarcerated at the Missouri State Penitentiary in October 1992.

Berdella became known as the Kansas City Butcher due to his practice of extensively dissecting his victims' bodies, which he would then dispose of in garbage bags, and The Collector due to the movie which he stated was the basis of the fantasies behind the modus operandi of his crimes.

== Early life ==
Robert Berdella was born on January 31, 1949, in Cuyahoga Falls, Ohio, the first of two sons born to Robert Andrew Berdella Sr., a die setter for the Ford Motor Company, and Mary Louise (née Huffman) Berdella. Berdella's father was a devout Roman Catholic of Italian descent, while his mother was of German and British descent. The family regularly attended Mass, and both sons regularly attended religious education courses.

As a child, Berdella was intelligent but a loner who rarely played outside his home and seldom had friends visit to socialize. He had a speech impediment and wore thick glasses from the age of five because he was severely nearsighted; he was also diagnosed with high blood pressure, for which he took several medications. Berdella was largely unathletic, whereas his younger brother, Daniel, seven years his junior, displayed an aptitude for sports from an early age. Berdella's father valued sports and physical education and viewed his older son's lack of interest in sports as a sign of failure, often comparing him unfavorably with his younger brother. Occasionally, Berdella's father physically and emotionally abused his children, such as by beating them with a leather strap.

Berdella performed well academically, though teachers often found him difficult to teach, partly due to his aloofness and his being the recipient of bullying by other students. Because of this, he seldom socialized with his peers.

When Berdella reached puberty, he discovered that he was homosexual; initially, he kept this fact a closely guarded secret, and he did not become open about his sexuality for several years. Nonetheless, in his early teens, he briefly had a girlfriend.

=== Adolescence ===
By his mid-teens, Berdella had begun to display a degree of aggression, becoming rude and condescending to others, particularly women. He learned about cooking and art and developed showmanship. On Christmas Day 1965, the Berdella family drove to Canton, Ohio, to visit relatives. That evening, Berdella's father suffered a heart attack at the age of 39, from which he died two days later. Two days later, Berdella—having returned to Cuyahoga Falls by himself—was told by his family that his father had died. Berdella sought solace in his Catholicism, reading extensively about many faiths. He eventually became cynical about all religion.

In 1965, Berdella saw the film adaptation of the John Fowles novel The Collector. The plot of the film revolves around a disturbed man who stalks and then abducts a young woman whom he finds attractive, holding her captive in his windowless stone basement and viewing her as little more than an attractive specimen. After several weeks, the woman dies of a contracted illness despite her captor's efforts to keep her alive. Berdella later stated that this movie had formed a lasting impression on him.

Shortly after the death of Berdella's father, his mother remarried, an action that was met with resentment by Berdella, who viewed it as a form of betrayal against his father. As a result, he became increasingly withdrawn and further immersed himself in the solitary activities he had participated in since childhood, such as painting, collecting coins and stamps, and writing to foreign pen pals. Berdella would later claim that his hobby of writing to pen pals in countries such as Vietnam and Burma and their sending him stamps and photographs of mythical and historical icons, ancient cultures, and architecture would lead to his avid interest in primitive art, photographs, and antiques. From approximately 1965, he began collecting such artifacts; this practice would inspire him to open his own antiques business in 1982.

== Relocation to Kansas City ==
=== College years ===
In the summer of 1967, Berdella graduated from Cuyahoga Falls High School. Throughout his studies in high school, he had earned such excellent grades and showed such potential that in 1966, one teacher had placed him in an independent study program. Shortly after graduation, Berdella relocated to Kansas City, enrolling in the Kansas City Art Institute (KCAI), with aspirations of becoming a college professor. In his first year at the KCAI, Berdella was considered an attentive and talented student, although by his second year, he became vocally anti-authoritarian, becoming acquainted with a clique of students who supplied him with drugs, which he then sold to other students at a profit. In addition, he began regularly abusing alcohol. He also engaged in acts of animal torture on at least two occasions; during one of these instances, he decapitated a duck in the presence of his peers, and in the second, he experimented with sedatives and tranquilizers on a dog.

At the age of 19, Berdella was arrested for attempting to sell methamphetamine to an undercover officer; he was released after posting a $3,000 bond (equivalent to about $27,800 as of 2026). He would later plead guilty to the offense and was handed a five-year suspended sentence. One month after this first arrest, Berdella and two other students were arrested for possession of marijuana and LSD in Johnson County. On this occasion, Berdella could not post bond, and he spent five days in jail; the charges against him and one of the other students were later dropped due to a lack of evidence.

=== 4315 Charlotte Street ===
In 1969, Berdella voluntarily withdrew from KCAI after receiving harsh criticism from college administrators for killing and cooking a duck for the sake of art. He chose to remain in Kansas City and in September of that year, he moved into an address within the Hyde Park district: 4315 Charlotte Street. By this stage, Berdella had been openly gay for several years. (Note: Berdella had first begun socializing in gay bars in Akron in 1967, although he is not known to have formed any firm relationships until several years after his relocation to Kansas City.) He began spending much of his free time with male prostitutes, drug addicts, petty criminals, and runaways. Berdella would typically befriend these individuals, then "try to help free them from their drug addictions or criminal lifestyles", though he was adamant that, throughout much of the 1970s, he had no physical contact whatsoever with any of them.

To several of his neighbors, Berdella stated that he felt almost like a foster parent to many of these youths. (Note: Berdella held a brief relationship with a bisexual Vietnam veteran in 1982 who had a severe emotional disorder. The relationship was one of the few serious ones Berdella engaged in when living in Kansas City.) By the early 1980s, many of his older acquaintances had ceased having any form of social contact with him. Berdella increasingly relied on these young men as a source of companionship and friendship. He would later claim to have become increasingly frustrated that many of these individuals were ignorant of his efforts to help steer them away from self-destructive behavior.

Despite these later claims, Berdella would often engage in sexual relations with the men he befriended, and would establish a degree of control over them, in part to engage in these sexual relations, by loaning them money and allowing them to live rent-free at his house for periods of time.

To his neighbors, Berdella was considered flamboyant yet helpful and civic-minded, despite the generally unkempt state of his property and his somewhat haughty attitude. Beginning in the late 1970s, Berdella worked with the South Hyde Park Crime Prevention and Neighborhood Association, becoming their chairman in the early 1980s and encouraging neighborhood watch patrols. He remained active in the association until the mid-1980s, when he left his position. Berdella also volunteered at fundraising events for a local public television station until the mid-1980s.

Shortly before Berdella moved into his Charlotte Street address, he began working as a short-order cook in various restaurants around Kansas City, in part to help pay lawyer fees and fines accrued from his previous drug arrests. For additional income, he also sold art and antiques he had collected via contacts he had established in Africa, Asia, South America, and various Pacific Rim countries. He initially operated this side business from his home.

Both Berdella's cooking career and the antiques business flourished, and by the mid-1970s, he began working as a senior cook at several renowned Kansas City restaurants. He joined a local chefs' association and helped establish a training program for aspiring chefs at a local community college. At the same time, he devoted more attention to his own business. By 1981, he had established several contractual agreements with both national and international contacts for his antiques business. He viewed this as his full-time job and later ceased working as a chef.

== Bob's Bazaar Bizarre ==
In 1982, Berdella began renting his own booth at the Westport Flea Market. This store was named Bob's Bazaar Bizarre, and primarily sold and traded primitive art, jewelry, and antiques. Although he occasionally made a generous monthly profit, the income from this business was insufficient to cover his expenses and make ends meet. As a result, Berdella would occasionally steal or scavenge items to sell at his booth. He would also take lodgers at his home as a means of gaining additional income.

At the flea market, Berdella became acquainted with a fellow merchant named Paul Howell, who operated a booth adjacent to his own. Soon, Berdella became acquainted with Paul Howell's younger son, Jerry. Initially, Jerry Howell and his friends taunted Berdella for his overt homosexuality, although according to Berdella, Jerry Howell later confided to him that he and his friends occasionally earned money as male prostitutes.

By the early 1980s, Paul Howell had relocated his business to a store close to the intersection of 39th and Main Street, with his family living in an apartment above the shop. Berdella remained a casual friend of the family, offering his assistance if Jerry encountered any minor scrapes with the law. By the summer of 1984, Jerry Howell had turned 19.

== Murders ==
=== First known victim ===
Berdella is believed to have killed his first victim on July 5, 1984: 19-year-old Jerry Howell. Berdella had promised to drive the youth to attend a dancing contest in Merriam. According to Berdella, he plied Howell with alcohol, diazepam, and acepromazine both in his car and at his house until he became unconscious. He then injected Howell with a heavy tranquilizer before binding him to his bed.

Howell was restrained to Berdella's bed for approximately 28 hours. Throughout this period of captivity, Berdella repeatedly drugged, tortured, raped, and violated him with foreign objects, repeatedly ignoring Howell's queries as to why he was being treated this way and his pleas to be freed. According to Berdella, Howell's death occurred because he "either asphyxiated on [his own] vomit, or the combination of the gag and the medicines were too strong for him to be able to catch breath".

Berdella would later state that he briefly attempted to perform cardiopulmonary resuscitation upon Howell after he had died, then dragged his body to the basement. He suspended Howell's body above a large cooking pot and made several incisions to his inner elbows and jugular vein, leaving the body suspended in this position overnight to allow the blood to drain from his corpse. The following day, he dismembered Howell's body using a chainsaw and boning knives and wrapped the sections in newspaper and trash bags. These bags were later placed inside larger trash bags, which Berdella placed outside for a garbage crew to collect and take to a landfill site.

When later questioned by officers investigating Howell's disappearance, Berdella claimed to have driven the youth to Merriam as promised, where the two had parted company close to Howell's intended destination. Berdella further claimed he had not seen him since.

As would be the case with all of Berdella's murders, he kept a detailed log in which he documented each act of sexual and physical torture inflicted upon his victim. Berdella would recall that, like his subsequent victims, Howell had repeatedly pleaded with Berdella to stop the abuse and torture, although Berdella would either ignore these pleas, taunt his victim, or threaten him. He would remain adamant to investigators that this was not for his enjoyment, but for what he called his "physical and mental satisfaction".

=== Subsequent murders ===
On April 10, 1985, an itinerant former lodger, 20-year-old Robert Sheldon, arrived on Berdella's doorstep, asking if he could stay at his house for a short time. According to Berdella, although Sheldon paid his rent responsibly, he considered him to be "an inconvenience". Although he was not physically attracted to Sheldon, on April 12, he drugged and held him captive because he returned home from work to find Sheldon intoxicated. Berdella was adamant that he held no firm malice toward Sheldon, but saw him as someone upon whom he could "express some of the anger and frustration that [he] had toward other people".

Sheldon was drugged with sedatives and held captive in the second-floor bedroom for three days, enduring forms of torture such as the swabbing of drain cleaner in his left eye, the insertion of needles beneath his fingertips, the binding of his wrists with piano wire with the intention of permanently damaging the nerves in his hands, and filling his ears with caulking to reduce his hearing capacity.

Three days after Berdella had begun holding Sheldon captive, on April 15, a workman came to perform some scheduled work on the roof of his home, leading Berdella to fatally suffocate Sheldon by placing a sack over his head, which he then tightened with a piece of rope. He later dissected Sheldon's body in the third-floor bathroom.

The following June, Berdella found Mark Wallace (a very casual acquaintance who had previously helped him with yard work) hiding in his tool shed to seek shelter from a severe thunderstorm. As had been the case with Robert Sheldon, Berdella invited him inside his house, and, noting Wallace's acute state of tenseness and depression, volunteered to inject him with chlorpromazine with the explanation that this would "calm down and relax" him. Wallace willingly accepted the offer and, 30 minutes later, Berdella decided to render him captive.

Wallace was carried to the second-floor bedroom, where he endured almost a day of captivity and torture, including the application of alligator clips to his nipples to facilitate electrical shocks to his body at any point at which Wallace began regressing into a state of unconsciousness. According to Berdella, one hour after his "experimenting" with hypodermic needles by inserting them into various muscles upon his victim's back, Mark Wallace died from a combination of "the drugs, the gag, and the lack of oxygen". He noted this victim's time of death as being 7:00 p.m. on June 23.

=== Increase in brutality ===
On September 26, 1985, Berdella answered a phone call from an acquaintance named James Ferris (Note: Only Berdella referred to James Ferris by his given first name, Walter.) who asked to stay at Berdella's home for a short time. Berdella agreed, with the intention of kidnapping Ferris, whom he arranged to meet at a bar that evening. Despite the brutality to which he had subjected his first three victims, Berdella claimed that Ferris was the first victim upon whom he intentionally inflicted torture. He also informed investigators that there were occasions during his final three victims' periods of captivity when he ceased making additions to his abuse logs because he assumed the victim would not "be able to make it much longer".

Berdella brought Ferris home and drugged him with crushed tranquilizers concealed in a meal, then tied him to his bed before torturing him almost constantly for approximately 27 hours. The torture included the repeated administration of 7,700-volt electrical shocks to the shoulder and testicles for up to five minutes in each instance, and acupuncture via hypodermic needles to the neck and genitals. Ferris gradually became delirious, but Berdella continued his physical and sexual assaults until he noted in his log that Ferris was "Unable to sit up more than 10–15 sec[onds]". The next entry read "Very delayed breathing", and finally, Berdella noted that Ferris died with a slang term he had used in his career as a chef, "86", which Berdella later explained "meant anything from 'Throw it out' to 'Stop the project'".

Todd Stoops was a 23-year-old drug addict and occasional prostitute who, with his wife, had twice lived briefly at Berdella's house in 1984. After Stoops and his wife moved out of Berdella's home the second time, Berdella did not see him again until a chance encounter at Kansas City's Liberty Memorial Park on June 17, 1986. Berdella invited him to his house with an offer of lunch, with an added incentive of sex as Stoops stated he needed $13 to purchase drugs (the equivalent of about $38 as of 2026)

Berdella would later stress to investigators that he had been extremely physically attracted to Stoops, and this victim was held captive for two weeks before he died. He gradually increased Stoops' terror, attempting to make him a cooperative and incapacitated sex slave. Berdella used electrical shocks through Stoops' closed eyes in an attempt to blind him, and injected drain cleaner into his larynx to try to silence his screaming.

During the second week of his capture, Stoops asked Berdella for a soft drink and a sandwich. When Berdella refused, Stoops burst into tears. On June 27, he ruptured Stoops' anal wall with his fist, causing bleeding and discharge. Towards the end of Stoops' captivity, he tried to feed his captive ice cream and soup, although Stoops "wasn't able to keep anything down". By the final day of his captivity, Stoops was so weak Berdella later stated he had been unable "to breathe in a sitting position". On July 1, 1986, Stoops died; a forensic pathologist later testified that the ruptured anal wall caused septic shock which proved fatal.

In the spring of 1987, Berdella became friendly with 20-year-old Larry Wayne Pearson. This casual friendship began when Pearson entered his shop and explained to Berdella that, as a child, he had held an interest in both witchcraft and wizardry. Shortly thereafter, Pearson temporarily lodged with Berdella and willingly performed chores around his home as a means of paying rent. According to Berdella, he did not initially intend to capture Pearson, but began forming the plan to do so on June 23, two weeks after having bailed Pearson out of jail and noting Pearson—in the weeks before his captivity—displayed little interest in finding a job.

On the afternoon of June 23, Berdella and Pearson watched the movie Creepshow 2 together before eating lunch. As the two "[drove] around" Kansas, the young man began jokingly referring to his practice of robbing gay men in Wichita; this disclosure finalized Berdella's decision to hold Pearson captive. That evening, Berdella ensured Pearson became intoxicated before injecting him with chlorpromazine and moving him down to his basement, where he bound Pearson's hands above his head, then linked the rope he had used for this purpose to a brick column, before injecting Pearson's larynx with drain cleaner. He then brought an electrical transformer to the basement.

According to Berdella, Pearson was by far the most cooperative of his six murder victims. On the fifth day of his captivity, having by this stage endured torture such as the repeated administration of electrical shocks with the transformer, and the breaking of several hand bones with an iron rod to render him submissive, Berdella deduced Pearson had earned his trust as to his continued cooperation in his sexual and physical abuse. As a form of reward, Pearson was moved to the second floor, with Berdella first informing Pearson that if he continued to cooperate, he would not continue to inflict as much pain upon him as he had done so while he had been held captive in the basement. Throughout the latter part of his six weeks of captivity, Pearson trained himself to sleep without moving, so that he did not antagonize Berdella and thus invite further torture or return to the basement.

After six weeks of captivity, Pearson deeply bit into Berdella's penis before screaming he could not continue to tolerate his ongoing poor treatment. In response, Berdella killed Pearson by first bludgeoning him into unconsciousness with a tree limb, then suffocating him with a bag and ligature, before driving to the hospital to receive treatment for his wound. Pearson's body was later dismembered in the basement, and his head was initially stored in a plastic bag inside Berdella's freezer before being buried in the backyard. (Note: In his subsequent confessions to investigators, Berdella stated he had dismembered the bodies of Sheldon, Wallace, Ferris, and Stoops in the bathtub in his third-floor bathroom, whereas the bodies of Howell and Pearson had been dismembered in his basement.)

== Final victim ==
"You did not choose to be here, but you are. For you to survive being here, and for you to, you know, make it, it could either be rough or it could be easy. If I grow to like you, and to trust you, then I could do special things for you, such as buy you cigarettes, pick up a movie on the way home from work and so forth. Don't try to fight me, or you'll just get more of what you had earlier. You see, what you got, is nothing compared to what you can have."

— Robert Berdella, conversing with Christopher Bryson. March 29, 1988.

At 1:00 a.m. on March 29, 1988, Berdella abducted his last victim, a 22-year-old male prostitute named Christopher Bryson, whom he lured to his house under the promise of payment for sex. At Berdella's home, Bryson was knocked unconscious with an iron bar, then bound to Berdella's bed, where he was subjected to similar methods of abuse and torture endured by previous victims, although in Bryson's case, Berdella repeatedly swabbed his eyes with ammonia, before exclaiming to him: "The only things you need to think about are you, me, and this house."

After several days, Berdella explained to Bryson that he had begun to "trust" his captive, and that although he was willing to discuss some aspects of the abuse and torture he was receiving, there would be no negotiations regarding his sexual abuse. Berdella finished this discussion with a stern warning: "I've gotten this far with other people before, and they're dead now, because of mistakes they made."

=== Escape ===
By the third day of his capture, Bryson had earned sufficient trust from Berdella to persuade him to establish a daily regime of tying his hands in front of him after his sexual abuse rather than to the bed above his head, upon the excuse that his doing so was restricting the circulation to his arms. He had also persuaded Berdella to leave a television on in the room with the remote control placed between his legs whenever Berdella was out of the room. Bryson later stated to investigators that he thought almost constantly about escaping. The following day, he managed to break free of his restraints by burning through them using a book of matches Berdella had inadvertently left in the room and within his reach when he had left the house to go to work.

Wearing nothing but a dog collar, Bryson managed to escape from the house by jumping from a second-floor window, breaking a bone in his foot. He ran toward a meter reader who was walking down the other side of the street, shouting for him to call the police. The meter reader led Bryson to the house he had been approaching; the occupants called the police, who arrived minutes later.

Questioned at the scene by four officers, Bryson initially claimed he had been hitchhiking when abducted by Berdella, who had kidnapped, raped, and tortured him for four days before he escaped by jumping from a window on the second floor of the property. Berdella had kept him bound to a bed on the second floor of the house throughout much of the time, repeatedly sodomizing him, drugging him, and injecting his throat with drain cleaner to diminish his ability to speak loudly. As Bryson spoke, the officers also noted that in addition to the dog collar and broken foot, Bryson had red, swollen eyes and visible scars and welts across his entire body. Two officers were told to maintain discreet surveillance of the property; Bryson was driven to the Menorah Medical Center for treatment, accompanied by a third officer, while the fourth officer radioed the Kansas City Police Department (KCPD) to request a formal search warrant of the property.

== Arrest ==
During later questioning at the KCPD, (Note: This more detailed questioning occurred after Bryson had been released from the Menorah Medical Center, after he had undergone several days of treatment for his injuries.) Bryson divulged that his captor had shown him Polaroid images of men who appeared to be deceased, and that he was told that he would never leave the property and that if he became a nuisance or threat, he would either be subjected to greater levels of torture than what he had already endured, or simply be killed. (Note: Shortly after his release from hospital and further questioning by the KCPD, Christopher Bryson lapsed into cocaine abuse. With the state's assistance, he would complete a drug rehabilitation program. Bryson would also testify in person at an initial, pretrial hearing on June 9.)

=== Search warrant ===
On the afternoon of Bryson's escape, Berdella was arrested on charges related to the sexual assault of Christopher Bryson. He declined to allow officers inside his home, but the earlier requested warrant to search Berdella's property was drafted, and the officers gained access to the property the same day. Corroborating Bryson's claims of having been restrained and tortured in a second-floor bedroom, investigators discovered the bedroom on the second floor had burnt ropes attached to the posts at the foot of the bed. Also in the room was an electrical transformer plugged into a wall, with wires leading to the bed. A metal tray containing syringes, small bottles apparently containing prescription drugs, swabs, and eye drops was also close to the bed. Also found in the room were a long iron pipe, various lengths of rope, and leather belts. Investigators also noted that posts on the bed had been extensively worn, suggesting that restraints had earlier been tied to them, and that the individual or individuals had struggled to free themselves. (Note: Investigators had until 07:30 on April 3 to compile sufficient evidence to formulate either an arrest warrant, or a statement of probable cause to justify Berdella's continued incarceration. To persuade a judge to sign the statement of probable cause justifying the continued search of Berdella's house and his detainment, police had Bryson – still hospitalized – identify Berdella as his captor from a photographic array, while also listing the statutory crimes committed and provable in a courtroom, via listing the findings thus far at his house. Bail was denied for Berdella at this stage, and the search of his property continued under the supervision of a criminologist from the FBI's Kansas City office.)

Searching the house and grounds of 4315 Charlotte Street, investigators uncovered a human skull inside a closet on the second floor of his property, and a partially decomposed human head in the backyard. The search also uncovered several human vertebrae scarred by both hacksaw and knife marks stowed in a hallway, and several human teeth stowed in two envelopes. Both a hacksaw and a miter saw were discovered in the basement of the property, and a chainsaw was also found to be soiled with bloodstains, flesh, and pubic hairs. Luminol tests revealed that the floor of Berdella's basement and two plastic trash barrels were extensively bloodstained.

The home was also found to have 334 Polaroid pictures and 34 snapshot prints of various men. These pictures showed Christopher Bryson and several other men both in life and in death; many of the images had been taken while the subjects were being tortured. The search also uncovered numerous restraints and sexual devices, pornographic literature, hypodermic needles, and a book on narcotics. Officers also discovered a stenographer's pad containing detailed torture logs that Berdella had maintained for each victim, lying atop a chest of drawers. Several newspaper clippings from The Kansas City Star mentioning a missing young man named Jerry Howell, and a wallet and driver's license belonging to a missing person named James Ferris were discovered in a closet on the second floor of the property.

=== Task force and further investigation ===
Before the search of Berdella's property had concluded, the KCPD assembled a special task force of 11 detectives and one sergeant to focus exclusively on the Berdella case. This task force extensively researched Berdella's history, discovering that he was well known among Kansas City's male hustlers, having earned a reputation for preying on transient young men. Several of these male prostitutes were also reluctant to accept him as a client both because of his penchant for drugging, injecting, and torturing his sexual partners and acquaintances, and also because he had long been considered a suspect in the disappearance of the two men whose personal possessions had been found in his house (Jerry Howell and James Ferris).

Missing person reports had been filed for both of these men, and Berdella had been extensively questioned in relation to these disappearances; he denied having anything to do with the disappearances. Despite being considered a prime suspect in both cases and being placed under surveillance, police had been unable to find any solid evidence linking him to either man's disappearance. In both instances, after giving his initial statement to police, Berdella indignantly refused to talk further without having a lawyer present. His lawyer would later threaten to file harassment accusations against police unless their questioning and surveillance of him ceased.

James Ferris's wife identified him in several Polaroids found at Berdella's property, some taken after her husband's death. Paul Howell formally identified one picture of a young man hanging upside down in Berdella's basement as his son. Several other Polaroid images depicted as-yet unidentified young men, and several detectives were assigned to identify them to determine if they were alive or dead and, if alive, the circumstances of the picture. Since several of these images depicted a section of the body of the photographer, on April 13, Berdella was ordered to pose nude for a series of photographs in the same precise angles as the evidence photos for comparison with the original Polaroid images.

As numerous male names had been found scrawled upon various stenographers' pads at Berdella's address, the detectives began attempting to trace each of them. One of those traced, a young man named Freddie Kellogg, was able to state to detectives that he and several other young men had intermittently lodged with Berdella since the early 1980s, and that Berdella had been in the habit of plying his lodgers with drugs – typically intravenously – before engaging in sex with them regardless of whether they consented or not.

Kellogg stated that for him to be allowed to lodge with Berdella, he must agree to persuade young men whom Berdella found attractive to attend parties at Charlotte Street so that Berdella could drug them. Should Berdella ever discover that any of them was a police informant, he would use this knowledge to blackmail him. Despite this threat, Kellogg stated that numerous male prostitutes and addicts had been reluctant to engage in any form of contact with Berdella because of rumors of his links to the 1984 disappearance of Jerry Howell.

In addition to these disclosures, Kellogg was able to name three of the men depicted in the Polaroids as Todd Stoops, Robert Sheldon, and Larry Wayne Pearson. The investigators would discover that Berdella had paid a $30 fee to secure a bond for Pearson in June 1987 (the equivalent of about $85 as of 2026), and that no further records existed to indicate that Pearson was still alive. Nonetheless, investigators did discover that in August 1987, Berdella had filed an assault report from a hospital room, alleging that a man named "Larry Person" had deeply bitten his penis during oral sex, causing a serious laceration. An interview with Robert Sheldon's employers at a Kansas City manufacturing plant confirmed that although the young man had been a reliable employee, he had suddenly ceased attending work in April 1985.

Shortly after the search of 4315 Charlotte Street had concluded, Berdella was informed of the discoveries at his property. The same afternoon he was ordered to pose for the series of nude photographs for comparison with the Polaroid images he had taken, investigators attempted to conduct their first formal investigation with him, although Berdella simply invoked his right to silence in this setting. (Investigators later sought to obtain handwriting samples from Berdella in an effort to prove he had written the notes found within the various stenographers' pads discovered at his house; he refused to cooperate and was sentenced to six months in jail for contempt of court.)

== Dental identifications ==
Initially, Berdella was formally charged with one count of felonious restraint, one count of assault, and seven counts of forcible sodomy, as investigators continued their investigations into the discoveries at his property. He was assigned a temporary public defender as his legal representative, and held in protective custody in a Jackson County jail in lieu of $500,000 bail (the equivalent of approximately $2,000,000 as of 2026). (Note: When formal murder by dismemberment charges were filed against Berdella, his bail sum was increased to $750,000 (the equivalent of approximately $2,000,000 as of 2026).)

In late April, the skull found inside Berdella's closet was identified via dental X-rays obtained via subpoena from the University of Kansas Medical Center as that of Robert Sheldon. The same day a dental identification was made upon Sheldon's skull, two men separately phoned the Kansas City Police Department to state one of seven unidentified young men depicted in a photographic array released to the media on April 27 was a former high school acquaintance of theirs named Mark Wallace. When a detective contacted Wallace's sister, she stated her brother had been missing since mid-1985. Shortly thereafter, investigators discovered that photograph "D" released to the media in this same array, was of Larry Wayne Pearson. As Pearson had once been a ward of the court in Wichita, his dental records were available to be compared with the skull found in Berdella's backyard.

Berdella would be formally charged with the murder by dismemberment of Larry Wayne Pearson in July after the head discovered in his backyard was formally identified as Pearson's on May 12. Prosecutors had gathered sufficient circumstantial evidence to accompany the physical evidence retrieved. (Note: Aside from Pearson's severed head and the striations upon his vertebrae, the accompanying evidence, compiled to bring this charge, included some 60 Polaroid photos of Pearson; the logs Berdella had kept of his captivity of the subject (and which the handwriting was proven to be Berdella's); chemical tests upon Pearson's hair which indicated the subject may have received fatal dosages of various tranquilizers; the injury Pearson was known to have inflicted upon Berdella on August 5, 1987; and the fact Berdella had paid Pearson's bond in June 1987.)

== First indictments ==
On July 22, 1988, a grand jury formally indicted Berdella for the murder of Larry Wayne Pearson. The following month, he was arraigned and pleaded guilty in the 4th Circuit of the Jackson County Court before Judge Alvin C. Randall to the first-degree murder of Larry Pearson. (Note: Berdella entered this plea of guilty at his arraignment hearing (in the voluntary company of his public defender) due to the fact that, at this hearing, unless the state has filed notice of intent to seek the death penalty at an arraignment hearing in which first-degree murder charges were filed, the automatic sentence to be filed upon receipt of a guilty plea is life imprisonment without parole.) The plea was entered following a late-morning recess in the arraignment hearing into this particular murder, and came as a surprise to both the judge and prosecuting attorneys. The prosecution team assigned to the case accepted the plea, with assistant prosecutor Pat Hall later explaining this decision as being "in the best interest of our client, the people of the state of Missouri".

Following the submission and acceptance of this plea, the judge insisted that Berdella confess under oath as to Pearson's death. In response to questioning by his attorneys, Berdella stated: "I put a plastic bag over his head, and tied it with rope and allowed him to suffocate." When asked if he performed this act deliberately and with malice aforethought, Berdella simply stated, "Yes." He was sentenced to life imprisonment without the possibility of parole. Upon being sentenced, Berdella was transferred to the Missouri State Penitentiary to commence his life sentence. He would later be temporarily placed in protective custody at the Potosi Correctional Center, due to concerns for his safety.

A second guilty plea submitted before the Jackson County Court on August 24 earned Berdella a further life term without parole for one charge of forcible sodomy against Christopher Bryson (six counts of sodomy and one charge of assault being dropped as part of a plea bargain); he would also receive a further term of seven years on one count of felonious restraint against Bryson on this date.

=== Plea bargain ===
Despite initially pleading not guilty to the remaining five murder charges on September 13, 1988, with the agreement of his two defense attorneys, Berdella ultimately conducted a plea bargain with the prosecutors to avoid the death penalty in these remaining charges. In this plea bargain, Berdella agreed to confess in graphic detail as to whom he had killed, what indignities he had inflicted on each victim, how he had killed each victim, and what he had done with their bodies. These confessions were given to prosecutors between December 13 and 15, 1988. In return for his cooperation, the prosecution agreed not to seek the death penalty at a formal hearing scheduled for 9 a.m. on December 19.

On December 19, 1988, Berdella formally waived his rights to be tried for any of the outstanding murder charges, upon the understanding he was to be convicted of one further count of first-degree murder (that of Robert Sheldon), and four counts of second-degree murder. He formally pleaded guilty to each of these charges before Judge Robert Meyers in the Jackson County Circuit Court. Members of the public were prohibited from attending this hearing, with only family members of his victims and news reporters permitted access to the proceedings. In response to these guilty pleas, Judge Meyers imposed five further concurrent life sentences, with an additional condition barring any prospect of parole in the sole case of first-degree murder to which Berdella pleaded guilty.

== Confessions ==
Berdella provided testimony to prosecutors between December 13 and 15, after he changed his plea and sought approval of their agreement not to seek the death penalty against him if he fully confessed. In this testimony, Berdella claimed the movie he had first seen in 1965, The Collector, had left a major impression on him. Following the sense of shock and disgust he claimed to have initially experienced after killing his first victim, the movie had resurfaced in his memory and subsequently became a motivating psychological force in the actions he exhibited against his victims in his subsequent murders. His victims, he stated to investigators, had lost any degree of humanity in his eyes once he had chosen to render them captive.

"These were not people that I thought of, once I had them bound and was using them ... They became something other than people to me. I never thought it out to the level of: 'What if one of these bodies ever gets loose?'"

— Robert Berdella, describing how he viewed his victims once he had decided to render them captive. December 13, 1988.

Berdella confessed that many of the abbreviated entries within his torture logs were simply shorthand terms for methods of abuse he had inflicted upon his victims, whereas others would describe either their reactions to these ongoing acts of abuse and torture, or his initial observations upon viewing them when he entered the room where he had kept them restrained. The entry reading "CP", for example, referred to the chlorpromazine he had injected into his victims to assist in restraining them, whereas entries reading "DC" referred to swabbing their eyes with drain cleaner or the injection of the substance into their vocal cords.

Entries reading "EK" or "EKG" referred to torture administered to his captives with electrical shocks, whereas several other entries contained the anatomical location where Berdella administered the abuse or torture to his victims. For example, at one point in relation to victim James Ferris, Berdella had written an entry reading: "2 1/2 ket nk + shoulder" to indicate he had injected 2.5 cubic centimeters of ketamine into his victim's neck and shoulder. Other entries such as "gag loose, no resist in retie" or "very delayed breathing, snoring" were more self-explanatory. Investigators consulted a specialist in toxicology in their investigation into Berdella following his arrest who stated that, judging by the notes he had written about victim Robert Sheldon, the accumulation of chlorpromazine injected into this victim had been toxic.

Furthermore, Berdella confessed to having alternately buried the two victims' heads in his backyard, adding that he retrieved and cleaned the first skull – that of Robert Sheldon – at the time he buried victim Larry Pearson's head in the same hole. Sheldon's skull was that which he placed inside a closet on the second floor of his property, in an area of the household Berdella referred to as "my gallery area", he removed the teeth from this skull and kept them stowed inside envelopes. He further claimed to have intended to retrieve Pearson's skull once sufficient time had elapsed for it to skeletonize, although he was adamant there had been no rational or sinister reason for his doing so. (Note: Berdella's identification of the two human heads upon his property had by this stage been corroborated by forensic anthropologists.) In addition, he vehemently denied media rumors that he had been engaged in any form of satanism, or that he had sold sections of his victims' bodies at his flea market booth.

Berdella was able to name all of his victims to investigators. Although one victim (Mark Wallace) had been seized by opportunity when Berdella had found him seeking shelter from a severe thunderstorm in his tool shed, his other five victims had been captured after he had unsuccessfully tried to steer them away from their general lifestyles, and had thus simply become frustrated at the failure of his efforts. Regarding each victim's captivity, Berdella described in graphic detail the sexual, physical, and emotional abuse to which he had subjected each victim, and which he had recorded within his torture logs. He tersely explained his successive actions to investigators on December 14 with the statement that he was "capturing them first, and what developed, developed." Nonetheless, he did claim that he had tried to prevent any of his victims from developing any form of malnutrition or infection by occasionally administering antibiotics or nutrients intravenously as his abuse and torture escalated.

The methods of torture exhibited against his victims had included the administration of high-voltage electrical shocks, starvation, the application of alkali-based detergents to their throats, vocal cords, or eyes, and the bludgeoning of their hands with the intention of rendering these body parts unusable. One other method of torture was the insertion of needles beneath their fingernails. Furthermore, Berdella confessed that the level of abuse he inflicted had increased with each successive victim, and he had viewed the Polaroid images he had taken of his victims as being a "trophy or record of the event".

Although police extensively searched for the remains of Berdella's victims throughout their initial investigation into his crimes, the confession he provided to investigators in the autumn of 1988 confirmed that the dismembered bodies of all six of his victims had been stowed in trash bags and taken to unknown landfill sites. Their bodies were never recovered.

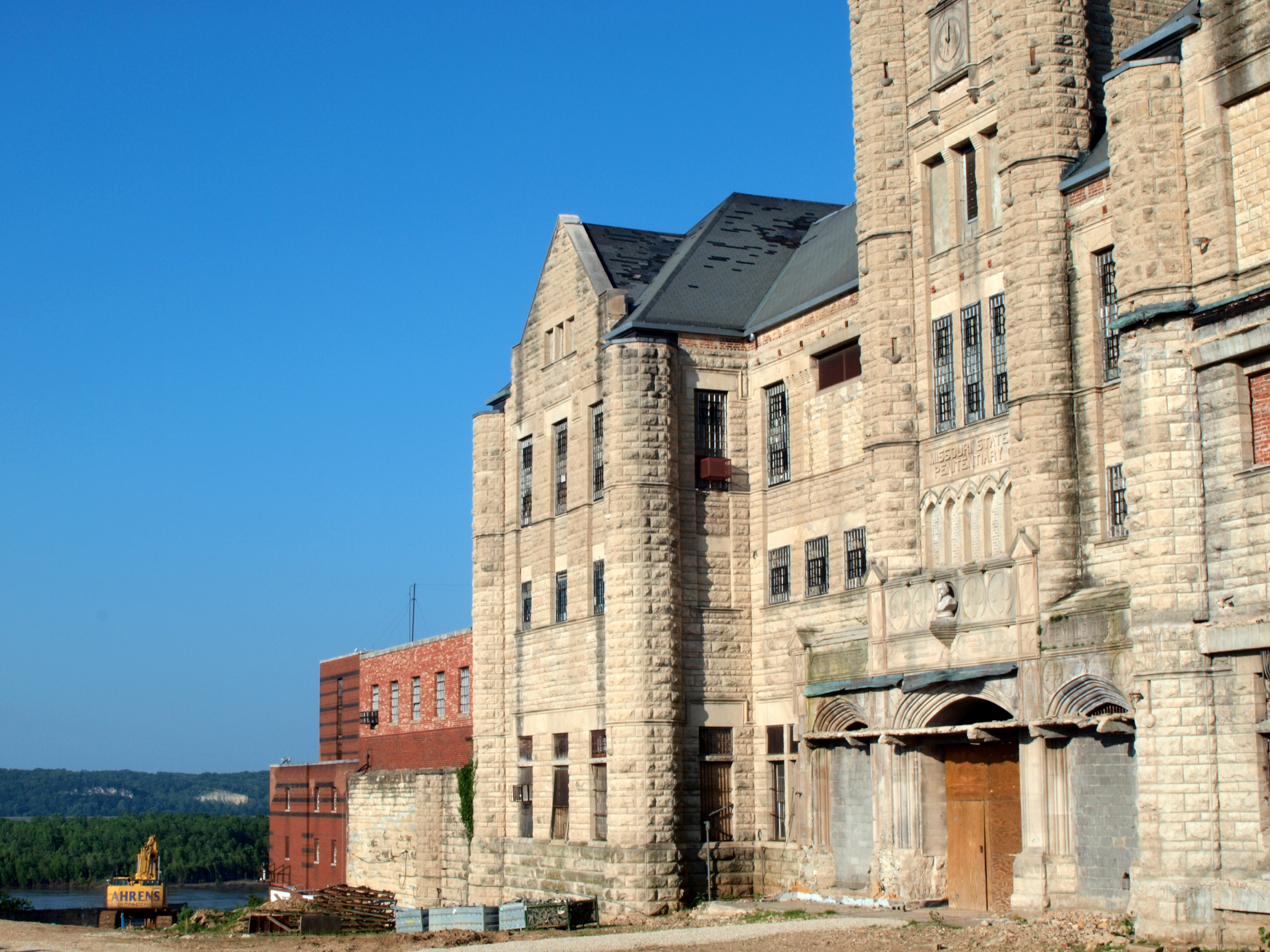
The Missouri State Penitentiary, where Berdella remained incarcerated until his death in 1992

== Incarceration ==
In the years following his 1988 convictions and incarceration, Berdella granted an interview to the Missouri-based television station KCPT and corresponded with numerous individuals. To all concerned, he attempted to restore his image as a "sensitive citizen" who had simply "made mistakes" in committing his crimes. He further claimed he had been demonized unfairly by the media before, during, and after his arraignments and plea bargains, and that police ineptitude had resulted in his being allowed to remain at liberty following his first murder.

Berdella also lodged several complaints with prison officials regarding prison conditions. He also wrote several letters to a local minister claiming that prison officials knew of his high blood pressure, yet were not providing him with his prescribed heart medication.

== Death ==
In 1992, Berdella contacted Rev. Roger Coleman, whom he had met when first incarcerated, relaying his distress that the staff at the Missouri State Penitentiary were allegedly withholding his heart medication. At 2:00 p.m. on October 8, 1992, Berdella complained to prison staff of severe heart pains, and was taken from his cell to the prison infirmary. Medical staff determined his heart was unstable and called an ambulance. Berdella was taken to a hospital in Columbia, Missouri, where he was pronounced dead from a heart attack at 3:55 p.m. He was 43 years old.

Shortly after, the judge at Berdella's trial, Alvin Randall, was informed of his death. In response, Randall sarcastically remarked: "Couldn't have happened to a nicer guy."

According to published reports, although Berdella had a depressive personality disorder, he was also a diagnosed sexual sadist who gained extreme sexual excitation from the humiliation, pain, and torture to which he had subjected his victims. Moreover, despite his claims to journalists whom he had contacted in the years of his incarceration, Berdella never expressed any degree of remorse for his actions and tersely referred to his victims as "play toys" in an interview he granted shortly before his death.

== Aftermath ==
In November 1988, auctions of Berdella's vast collection of artifacts and furniture confiscated from his home and business were held on four separate dattees, with the intention that all proceeds raised at the auctions would be used to pay his mounting legal fees within the then-ongoing legal proceedings. The auction attracted considerable national interest, receiving telephone bids from across the United States. Although many items sold for less than the expected price, by the end of the first day's auctioneering alone, more than $60,000 had been raised (equivalent to $163,000 as of 2026).

Berdella's house was purchased by a local businessman for an undisclosed sum in December 1988. The property was later demolished.

== Victims ==
By the time of Berdella's arrest, he had abducted, tortured, and murdered at least six young men (he was initially suspected of involvement in two other disappearances). Although more than twenty different men were depicted in postures suggesting unconsciousness or death within the 334 Polaroid images and thirty-four snapshot prints seized from 4315 Charlotte Street following his arrest, Berdella was adamant that the six men identified as victims and whom he had confessed to killing were the only ones that he murdered.

- Jerry Howell, 19, July 5, 1984: An acquaintance of Berdella who died of asphyxiation after approximately 28 hours of captivity, which included repeated sexual assaults. Howell had known Berdella since 1979.
- Robert Allen Sheldon, 20, April 12, 1985: Sheldon had lodged with Berdella on April 10, two days before his "formulating the intent" to keep him captive on April 12. He was killed by suffocation on April 15. His head was initially buried in Berdella's garden. Later, his skull was retrieved and stowed in Berdella's bedroom closet.
- Mark David Wallace, 27, June 22, 1985: Discovered by chance hiding from a thunderstorm in Berdella's tool shed. Wallace died of a combination of a lack of oxygen and injected drugs at 7 p.m. on June 23.
- Walter James Ferris, 25, September 26, 1985: The first victim whom Berdella stated he had intentionally tortured before his death. Berdella noted that Ferris became delirious during his captivity as a result of the torture he had been subjected to and the medication he had administered to him, with one of the final notations in his log of Ferris's capture being, "unable to sit up more than 10-15 [seconds]". His death was noted in Berdella's torture log with the notation "Stop the project".
- Todd Lee Stoops, 23, June 17, 1986: Kidnapped due to Berdella being "sexually frustrated" with him. The torture he endured before his death included electric shocks via a spatula placed across his eyelid in an unsuccessful attempt to blind him. Stoops died of a combination of blood loss and infection on July 1.
- Larry Wayne Pearson, 20, June 23, 1987: Held captive until August 5. Pearson was killed by suffocation after six weeks of captivity, which included having a piano wire tied around his wrists with the intention of causing nerve damage. His head was kept and buried in Berdella's garden.

== In media ==
=== Film ===
- The 2009 feature film Berdella is based directly on the murders committed by Robert Berdella. Written and directed by William Taft, and co-directed by Paul South, the film stars Seth Correa as Berdella.

=== Television ===
- A 2004 documentary, Bazaar Bizarre – sometimes styled James Ellroy Presents Bazaar Bizarre – is based on journalist Tom Jackman's book Rites of Burial and directed by Benjamin Meade. Bazaar Bizarre recounts the murders committed by Berdella and includes archive footage of interviews with Berdella before his death. Christopher Bryson is among those interviewed for this documentary.

== See also ==
- List of serial killers in the United States
- List of serial killers by number of victims

== Cited works and further reading ==
- Barrow, Lauren M.; Rufo, Ron A.; Arambula, Saul (2013). Police and Profiling in the United States: Applying Theory to Criminal Investigations. Boca Raton: CRC Press. ISBN 978-1-466-50436-3.
- Jackman, Tom; Cole, Troy (1995) [1992]. Rites of Burial. London: Pinnacle Books. ISBN 0-86369-996-0.
- Krajicek, David (2011). True Crime: Missouri: The State's Most Notorious Criminal Cases. Pennsylvania: Stackpole Books. ISBN 978-0-811-70708-4.
- Lane, Brian; Gregg, Wilfred (1995) [1992]. The Encyclopedia of Serial Killers. New York City: Berkley Books. pp. 46–47. ISBN 0-425-15213-8.
- Marlowe, John (2011). Chambers of Horror: Monstrous Crimes of the Modern Age. London: Arcturus Publishing. ISBN 978-1-84858-610-9.
- Marriott, Trevor (2013). The Evil Within: A Top Murder Squad Detective Reveals the Chilling True Stories of the World's Most Notorious Killers. London: John Blake Publishing. ISBN 978-1-85782-798-9.
- Morrison, Helen (2004). My Life Among the Serial Killers: Inside the Minds of the World's Most Notorious Murderers. New York City: Harper Collins. ISBN 978-0-06180-959-0.
- Newton, Michael (2002). The Encyclopedia of Kidnappings. Facts On File Crime Library. New York: Facts On File. p. 25. ISBN 978-0-8160-4486-3. LCCN 2001040170. OCLC 593209888. OL 9741936M.
- Ramsland, Katherine M. (2006). Inside the Minds of Serial Killers: Why They Kill. Westport, Connecticut: Praeger. ISBN 0-275-99099-0.
- Ressler, Robert (1993). Whoever Fights Monsters. Sydney: Simon & Schuster. ISBN 0-671-71561-5.
- Wecht, Cyril; Saitz, Greg (2007). Mortal Evidence: The Forensics Behind Nine Shocking Cases. New York: Prometheus Books. ISBN 978-1-59102-485-9.
- Whittington-Egan, Richard; Whittington-Egan, Molly (1992). The Murder Almanac. Glasgow: Neil Wilson Publishing. p. 13. ISBN 1-897784-04-X.
