= Kašpar Mašek =

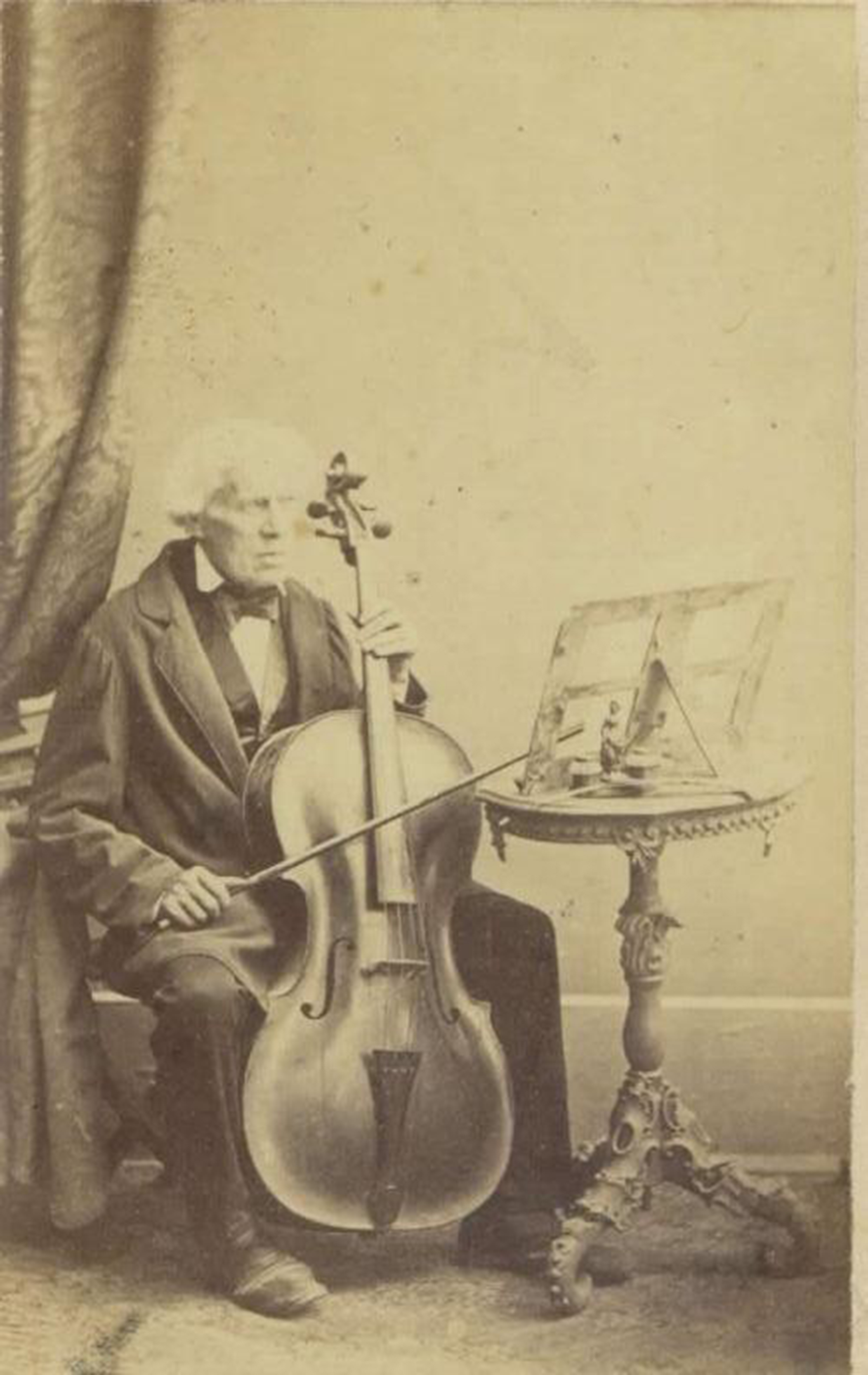
Mašek in 1860

Kašpar Mašek (Slovene: Gašper Mašek; 6 January 1794 – 13 May 1873) was a Czech-Slovenian composer.

The son of Vincenc Mašek (1755–1831), he was born and spent his early life in Prague, where he also studied. He then made a career as a composer for the theater in Graz and Slovenia. He composed operas, operettas, church music, and cantatas. Among his works are the patriotic Slovenian Overture (1870). He died in Ljubljana. His son Kamilo Mašek (1831–1859) was also a composer. His niece was pianist and composer Friederike Proch Benesch.

== Principal works ==
- Ouverture slovène (1870), for orchestra
- Kdo je mar, song
- Slovenski zvoki (1864), song
- Soldaška, song
- Gazele (1870), song
- Operas
  - Neznani
  - Emina
- Operetta
  - Kaznivi
- He also composed church music, cantatas and choral works, including nine masses.
