= Clara E. Thoms =

American pianist and soprano (1859–1941)

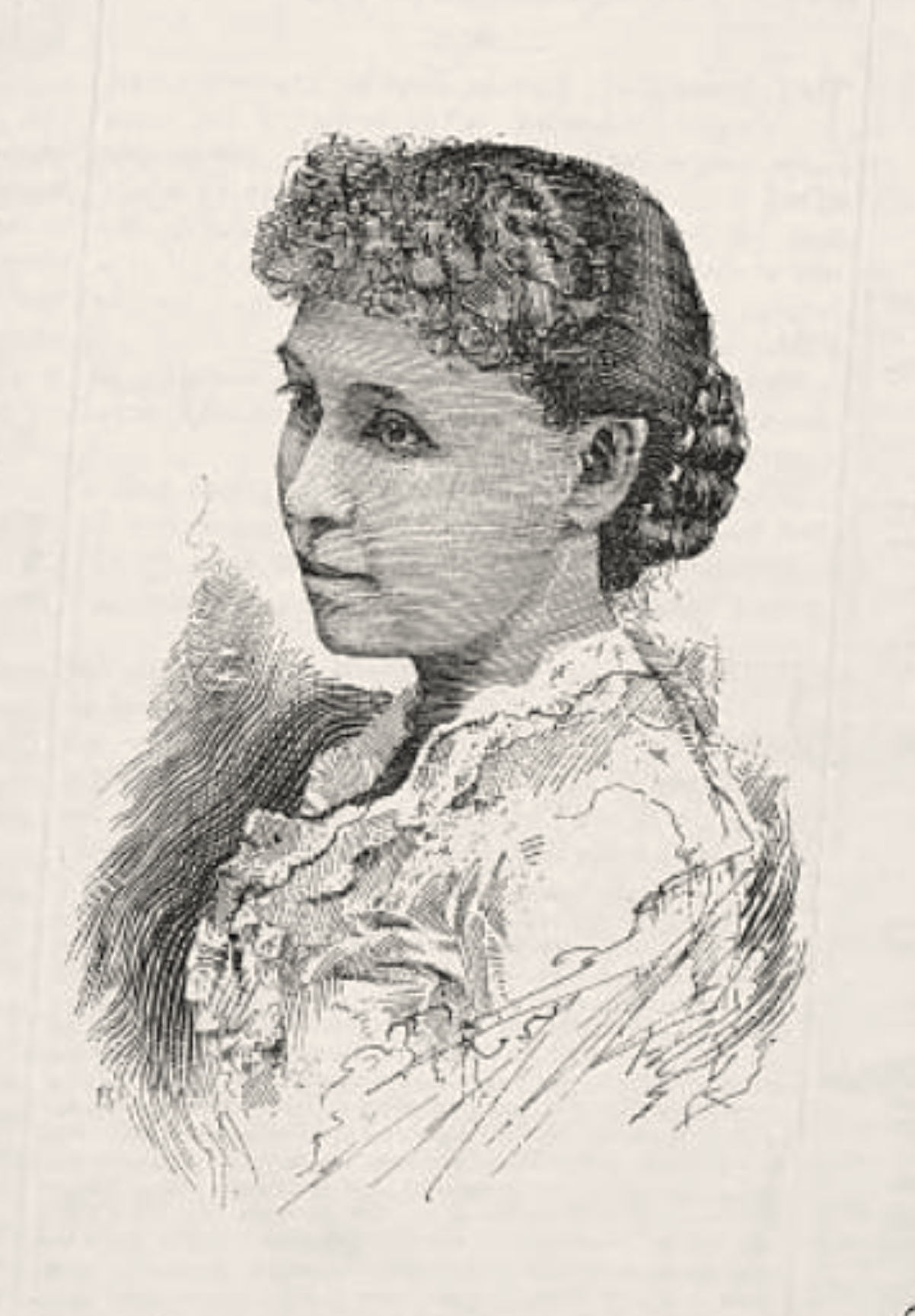
- Thoms as depicted on the front cover of The Musical Courier on February 19, 1890
- Born: Clara Ellinore Colby; 1859; Iowa, U.S.
- Died: October 9, 1941 (aged 82); Los Angeles, California, U.S.
- Education: Vienna Conservatory
- Occupations: Operatic soprano; Pianist

Clara Ellinore Colby, known by her married name Clara E. Thoms (1859 – October 9, 1941), was an American pianist, soprano, and music educator. Born in Iowa and raised in Minnesota and Missouri, she began performing as a pianist at the age of seven. In 1873 she went to Germany where she studied piano with Franz Liszt. On Liszt's advice she went to Vienna where she studied both voice and piano at the Vienna Conservatory. After graduating in 1876, she continued her vocal training with Heinrich Proch and began her opera career at the Vienna State Opera. She sang leading roles in operas in European theaters in 1877, and then returned to the United States in 1878 where she had a brief career as a soprano until her marriage in 1881 to William Mann Thoms (died 1913), the editor of the American Art Journal.

After her marriage, Thoms ceased performing for several years and gave birth to her son William in 1884. She resumed performing, predominantly as a pianist, in 1887. She remained active as a concert pianist and teacher in New York City until relocating to Buffalo, New York in 1896. There she taught both piano and singing until moving to St. Louis, Missouri in 1922 to be close to her elderly mother. She was active as a music teacher in St. Louis through 1939. She lived in Los Angeles in the last two years of her life, dying at the age of 82 in 1941.

== Early life ==
The daughter of Charles Clifton Colby and Ellen Ada Colby (née Frost), Clara Eleanor Colby was born in Iowa in 1859. Her father was a descendant of American Revolutionary War general Israel Putnam. By the time of the 1860 United States Federal Census she was living with her family in Freeborn, Minnesota. A child prodigy, she began performing as a pianist in public concerts at the age of seven in Minnesota. One of her early music teachers in America was Felix Schelling.

At the age of eight she traveled the United States as a concert pianist in a tour that extended from Texas through the Southern United States to Virginia. By the 1870s she lived with her family in Carthage, Missouri, where her father was a purveyor of musical instruments. In 1870 she performed in a concert for the re-opening of the newly remodeled Regan's Hall in Carthage. She was active as a pianist in concerts in Carthage during the early 1870s.

== Education and career in Europe ==
In October 1873 Colby traveled to Germany via the steamship Goethe which departed from New York Harbor for Hamburg, Germany. In Germany she studied piano with Franz Liszt who also discovered her talent for singing. On Liszt's advice she went to Vienna to study singing where she was initially a pupil of a Madam Bauer in 1874. She entered the Vienna Conservatory (now the University of Music and Performing Arts Vienna) where she was a voice student of Enrico Bertini and a piano student of Julius Epstein. She graduated from the conservatory in 1876 after two and half years of study at that institution. While a student she made her concert debut in Vienna on March 4, 1876, singing excerpts from the title role of Meyerbeer's Dinorah.

Colby continued studying singing with Heinrich Proch in Vienna under whom she specialized in the coloratura soprano repertoire. Proch was the chorus master at the Vienna State Opera (VSO), and she performed roles at that opera house. One of the roles she performed at the VSO was the title role in Donizetti's Lucrezia Borgia (1877). Proch also composed three concert arias for her voice. She also appeared with opera houses in Germany, Poland, and Hungary in the 1870s, including theaters in Lemburg, Breslau, and Leipzig in 1877. Roles in her repertoire included Arline in The Bohemian Girl, Berthe in Meyerbeer's Le prophète, Isabelle in Robert le diable, Sélica in L'Africaine, Gilda in Verdi's Rigoletto, Juliette in Gounod's Roméo et Juliette, Marguerite in Faust, Ophélie in Hamlet by Thomas, Rosina in Rossini's The Barber of Seville, Zerline in Auber's Fra Diavolo, and the title roles in Donizetti's Lucia di Lammermoor and Flotow's Martha.

== Return to the United States and marriage ==
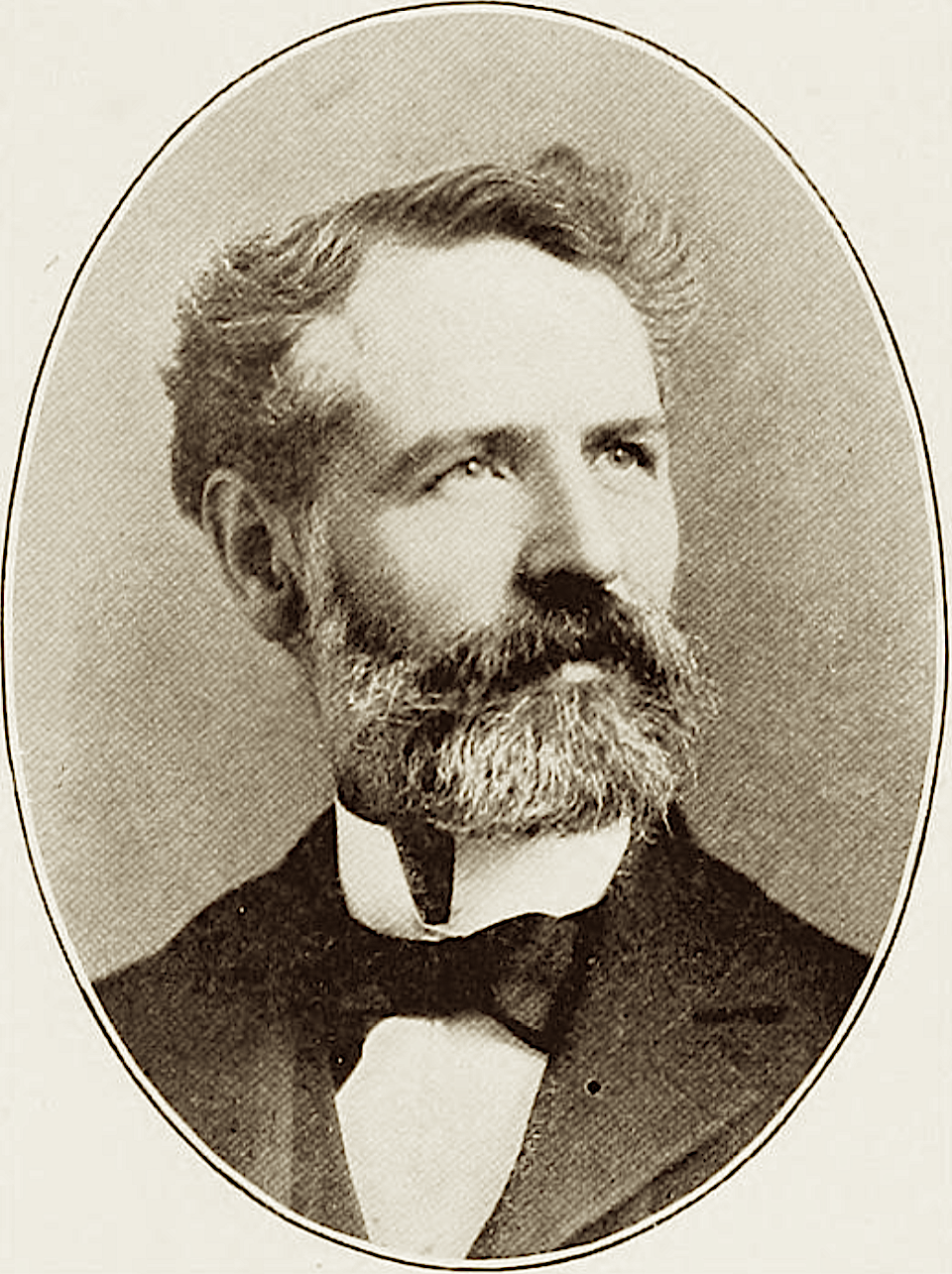
Her husband, William Mann Thoms

Colby returned to the United States to make her American opera debut with the Grand German Opera Company at the Terrace Garden Theatre in New York City on February 8, 1878. The following month she sang at both Philadelphia's Academy of Music and the Grand Opera House in Wilmington, Delaware in concerts with the Philadelphia Philharmonic Club. In April 1878 she returned home to Carthage to reunite with her mother whom she hadn't seen in years, and to give her first public concert in her hometown as a singer. In 1878-1879 she toured in concerts with fellow Carthage singer Flora Frost, including appearing in New York City at both Chickering Hall (CH) and Steinway Hall (SH). In the autumn of 1879 she returned to her piano roots, working as an accompanist for recitals in New York City.

In 1880 Colby toured the United States as the prima donna of an opera company organized by Mrs. Ivan C. Michels. On September 29, 1881, she married William Mann Thoms in Manhattan. William was the editor of the American Art Journal. Their son, William Frederick Thomas, was born on June 10, 1884. After her marriage, Clara ceased performing publicly for several years.

== Later career ==
In January 1887 Thoms performed Arthur Foote's Piano Trio No. 1 in C minor, Op. 5 with the New York Philharmonic Club (NYPC, a chamber ensemble made up of New York Philharmonic players) at CH, and returned to that hall the following November for a concert in which she was her own accompanist in singing Schubert's "Du bist die Ruh'". That same year she performed piano solos in a concert at SH which also featured performances by soprano Marie Biro De Marion, and sang and played piano in a recital given in Montclair, New Jersey. She also accompanied other singers in their recitals in New York City.

Thoms returned to the CH in February 1888 to perform with organist Will C. Macfarlane. In April 1888 she performed Xaver Scharwenka's Piano Concerto No. 1 at St. Louis Exposition and Music Hall with the St. Louis Musical Union (now the St. Louis Symphony Orchestra) under the baton of August Waldauer in a program which also featured Della Fox. She performed a concert in Erie, Pennsylvania on April 25, 1889, that was sponsored by the Scherzo Society. The following summer she gave a lauded recital at the Hudson Opera House to close the convention of the Music Teachers National Association which was given a glowing review by the critic of The Etude magazine.

In January 1890 Thoms once again performed with the NYPC in a program of chamber music at CH. The following month she accompanied Metropolitan Opera tenor Julius Perotti in a concert of opera arias he gave at the Broadway Theatre with conductor Nahan Franko, a concert which also featured her performing Liszt's arrangement of Weber's Polacca brillante, Op. 72. Thoms was featured on the front cover of The Musical Courier on February 19, 1890. She remained active in New York City as a concert pianist during the first half of the 1890s, and also taught piano out of her own studio located at 341 E. 19th St in Manhattan. She also worked as a vocal coach for singers like Adelina Patti and Nellie Melba. In 1894 she gave a recital at Loretto College in Ontario, Canada.

By 1896 Thoms had relocated to Buffalo, New York, where she operated a piano studio out of the Hotel Niagara. By 1905 she was also teaching singing out of her studio in Buffalo. She continued to work as a teacher in Buffalo in the 1910s. By 1912 she had gained a national reputation as a voice teacher with several of her students working in opera and the concert stage. Her husband died in May 1913.

In 1922 Thoms relocated to St. Louis, Missouri, where her mother was then living, and remained there as a music teacher. She was still accompanying her voice students in concerts in St. Louis as late as November 1939. Her students would occasionally perform music composed by Thoms, including an opera she wrote, Portia.

Thoms died October 9, 1941, in Los Angeles at the age of 82. She is buried at Forest Lawn Memorial Park.
