= Heinrich Proch =

Austrian composer

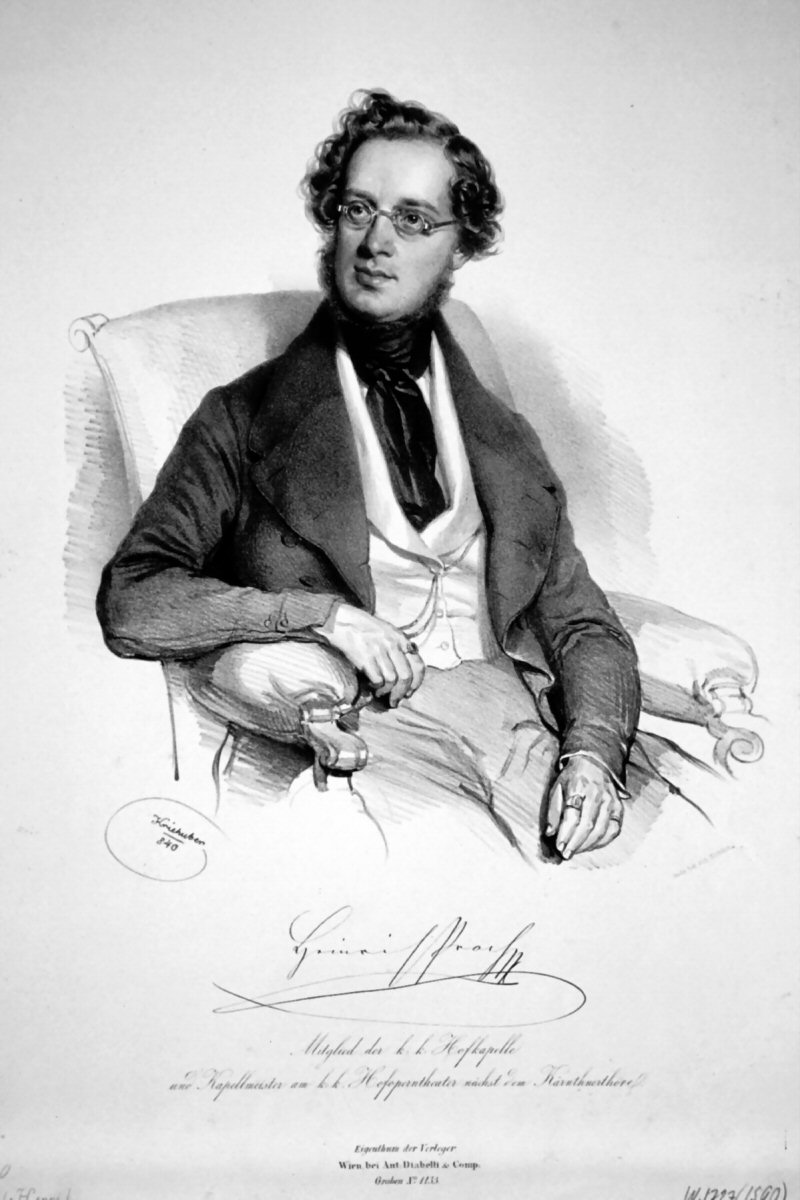
Heinrich Proch; lithography by Joseph Kriehuber 1840

Heinrich Proch (22 July 1809 – 18 December 1878) was an Austrian composer.

Born in Vienna, Proch studied jurisprudence and completed his training as a violinist in his native city. From 1834 to 1867, he was a member of the Vienna Hofkapelle. He was also Kapellmeister at the Theater in der Josefstadt between 1837 and 1840, after which he became First Kapellmeister at the Theater am Kärntnertor, the predecessor of the Vienna State Opera. Besides his conducting duties, Proch also worked as a singing teacher. His notable students included Róza Csillag, Anna Sachse-Hofmeister, Clara E. Thoms and Thérèse Tietjens.

He composed one opera (Ring und Maske), three operettas (Die Blutrache, Zweiter und dritter Stock and Der gefährliche Sprung), incidental music, orchestral works, and chamber music, as well as over 200 lieder, and won further distinction for his translations of Italian operas (e.g., Verdi's Il trovatore, Donizetti's Don Pasquale). Today, his most famous composition remains the air with variations Deh! torna mio bene, a virtuosic work for coloratura soprano that has been recorded by most sopranos from Luisa Tetrazzini and Amelita Galli-Curci to Maria Callas.

Proch died in Vienna. His daughter, Louise Proch, became a well-known singer and actor. His sister was pianist and composer Friederike Proch Benesch.
