= Kamilo Mašek =

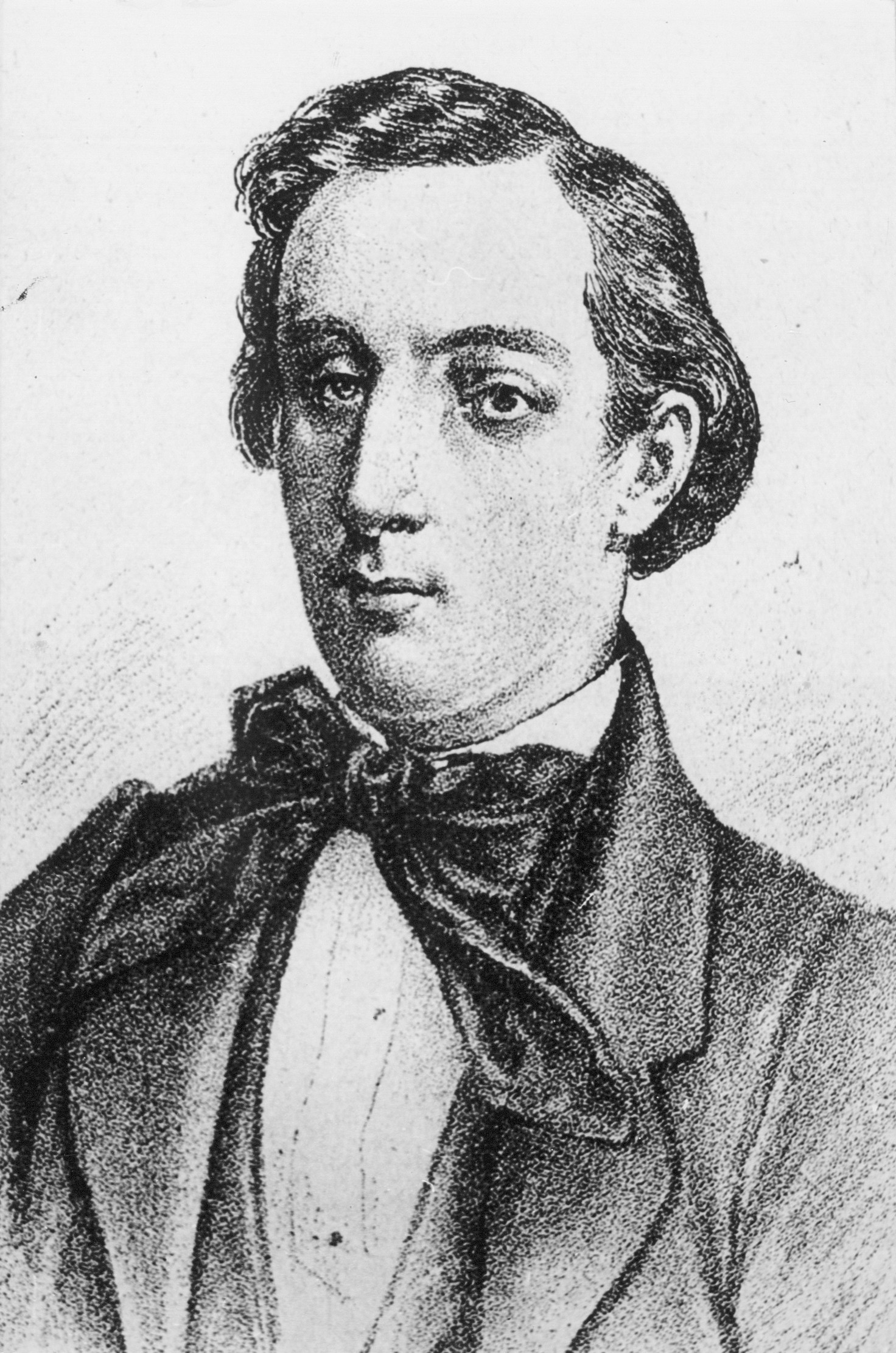
- Born: Camillo Leopold Bernhard Maschek; July 11, 1831; Ljubljana, Austrian Empire
- Died: June 29, 1859 (aged 27); Sankt Stefan ob Stainz, Austrian Empire
- Occupation: Composer
- Relatives: Friederike Proch Benesch (cousin)

Kamilo Mašek (11 July 1831 – 29 June 1859) was a Slovenian music composer of Czech descent.

== Life ==
Mašek was born on 11 July 1831 in Ljubljana, Austrian Empire, and baptized Camillo Leopold Bernhard Maschek. He was the son of the Czech-born Slovenian composer Gašper Mašek and Czech concert singer Amalie Horný Maschek. Mašek introduced more Romantic influence into Slovenian music. His compositions include various sacred works.

He died of tuberculosis in Sankt Stefan ob Stainz on 29 June 1859.

== Works ==
- Overture to the melodrama Judith (1854), for orchestra
- Polkas for wind orchestra
- Divertimento for two violas, two cellos and double bass (1854)
- Fantasy for piano and melofon
- Choral Music: The Lake
- Songs, a wreath of songs on texts by France Prešeren
