= Richard Macek =

American serial killer and sex offender (1948–1987)

- Born: Richard Otto Macek; 1948; Chicago, Illinois, U.S.
- Died: March 2, 1987 (aged 39); Dodge Correctional Institution, Waupun, Wisconsin, U.S.
- Cause of death: Suicide by hanging
- Other names: "The Mad Biter" "The Bite Mark Murderer" "The Bite Mark Killer"
- Convictions: Wisconsin: Murder; Illinois: Murder; Attempted murder
- Penalty: Wisconsin: Life imprisonment Illinois: 200-to-400 years imprisonment (Nancy Lossman); 50-to-70 years imprisonment (Kulisek)

Details
- Victims: 3+
- Span of crimes: August – September 1974 (confirmed)
- Country: United States
- States: Wisconsin, Illinois
- Date apprehended: December 5, 1975

Richard Otto Macek (1948 – March 2, 1987), known as The Mad Biter, was an American serial killer and sex offender who murdered at least two women and one little girl in Wisconsin and Illinois from August to September 1974. He was distinguished for his brutality during his crimes, which included biting his adult victims on the breasts.

Convicted and sentenced to long prison terms in both states, Macek remained incarcerated in Wisconsin until he committed suicide in 1987.

== Early life ==
Little is known about Macek's early life. Born in 1948 in Chicago, he moved to McHenry, Illinois at an early age and had a supposedly normal childhood. After completing the 11th grade, Macek enlisted in the United States Army, but served only six months before being dishonorably discharged because he "couldn't adjust to the Army".

Since 1968, Macek was arrested on a variety of charges, ranging from peeping to aggravated battery and even an attempted murder charge against a woman in Elmwood Park. When not in prison, he worked jobs such as a truck driver, machinist and cook, with his last verified workplace being at a factory in Union, where he lived with his wife and children.

On August 21, 1973, he was involved in a car incident in McHenry - while driving for work, he turned at a curve and noticed two girls, 14-year-old Kathryn Bell and 13-year-old Kimberly Quinn, walking in the middle of the road. Macek braked and steered to the left, but the girls also turned left, leading to them being hit by the car. Macek got out of the car and asked them if they were alright, but as they were too frightened, Bell and Quinn lied and said that they were fine, after which Macek left. Both were taken to the local hospital by Quinn's mother, where they were treated for their injuries. Macek was later questioned by police about the incident and given a ticket for failure to render assistance and failure to report a collision involving injury.

== Crimes ==
=== Murders ===
On August 13, 1974, an employee working at The Abbey Resort in Fontana, Wisconsin noticed that one of her colleagues, 24-year-old maid Paula Atkinson Cupit, had not been seen for a couple of hours and started searching for her. After searching through some guest rooms, she found Cupit's half-naked body in Room 606, left on the floor and covered with two blankets. The matter was immediately reported to the police, with an autopsy report concluding that Cupit had been sexually assaulted, stabbed in the heart and strangled to the point that her neck had been broken. The time of death was estimated to at around 1 and 2 PM, approximately two-to-three hours prior to her body being found. In an effort to encourage the public to report any potentially useful information, The Abbey Resort offered a $5,000 reward to anyone who could provide such information.

A few days after the murder, Sheriff William Cummings stated in a press release that 12 detectives were working full-time to solve the case, and that they were searching for suspects across the country. He also noted that Cupit's husband and an unnamed man who had rented the room prior to the murder had been ruled out as suspects, and that the killer had committed the crime while the door was locked, unlocking it with keys stolen from Cupit after he was done. A psychoanalyst from the FBI was also called in to assist the detectives with making a psychological profile of the killer.

On September 9, authorities in Crystal Lake, Illinois, received a report that a fire that had erupted on the first floor of a residential building on 210 Elmhurst Road. When the fire was put out, they found the bodies of the building manager, 27-year-old Nancy Lossman, as well as her daughter, 3-year-old Lisa Lossman. Nancy was found fully naked with a cord tied around her neck, while the partially-clothed Lisa was found in the bathroom with her head in the toilet bowl, a bra tied around her neck and a towel put over her face. The only other person in the apartment, 6-year-old Robert Lossman, suffered from smoke inhalation and was driven to the McHenry Hospital for treatment, but was unable to provide any useful information as he was asleep in his closed bedroom at the time of the attack.

One notable detail about the crime was that Nancy had multiple bite marks on one of her breasts that appeared to originate from her attacker. While detectives were not immediately able to link these to the killer, they decided it was important enough for preservation at a possible future date.

== Arrest and flight ==
On the early morning of July 26, 1975, Macek was searching for a victim to stalk in Woodstock, Illinois, when he saw 20-year-old Sharon Lee Kulisek doing her laundry at the Clothes Hamper Self-Service Laundry. Kulisek noticed him and immediately called the police, but was then attacked and assaulted by Macek, who hit her multiple times on the head. Two minutes later, officers arrived on the scene to find the telephone off the hook and a trail of blood leading to a rear corner of the building, where they found the injured Kulisek. She was immediately driven to the Rockford Memorial Hospital, while authorities searched for and soon detained Macek, who was held on a combined $200,000 bail on an attempted murder and aggravated battery charge. A subsequent motion to reduce his bond was dismissed, with his first hearing scheduled for August 12. A day prior to this hearing, Kulisek was released from hospital to her family's care, with recommendation that she avoid having too many visitors and that she would eventually recover from her injuries, which at that time included temporarily losing sight in both eyes.

After being arraigned before the 19th Judicial Circuit Court, Macek pleaded not guilty to the attempted murder and aggravated battery charges, with public defender Michael McNerney requestiong a motion to extend the trial so his client could undergo a psychiatric evaluation. While awaiting trial, Macek was residing at his mother's home in McHenry, but when the trial date finally arrived, his public defender reported that he was unable to contact his client. Authorities soon realized that Macek had not been seen in days, and he was immediately declared a fugitive from the law.

=== Recapture and new charges ===
After spending less than a month on the run, Macek was traced to San Bernardino, California, where he was detained by local police. His new bond was set at $500,000, with him initially being scheduled to be extradited back to Illinois to face trial for the Kulisek case. However, just five days later, it was concluded that he would instead be extradited to Wauwatosa, Wisconsin, where he faced multiple charges of sexual assault, rape and endangering another person in relation to an assault against another woman which took place at a Holiday Inn on October 14, 1974. Macek was linked to that crime after local authorities identified him via his modus operandi and mugshots from previous arrests.

At around the same time, Macek was linked to the Cupit murder after detectives George Hendel and Louis "Lou" Tomaselli noticed that all similar crimes committed in their jurisdiction were committed against hotel maids, in a similar fashion to which Macek carried out all his known attacks by that point.

== Trials ==
=== Attempted murders ===
While awaiting trial, it was decided that Macek would first be tried for the 1974 Holiday Inn attack, which would occur sometime after February 20, 1976. Before that could happen, however, Macek pleaded guilty to a single rape charge in exchange for the others being dropped, for which he was then interned at the Central State Hospital in Waupun as a "sex deviate". In the meantime, a preliminary court hearing ruled that he would have not actually violated his parole by moving to California, as he was arrested within a 30-day period in which he would have to return to Wisconsin to stand trial.

On August 17, Macek pleaded guilty to the attempted murder charge, while the aggravated battery charge was dropped. This came as a surprise to his attorney, Robert Wilbrandt Jr., who emphasized that there was no deal made between him and the Prosecutor's Office to facilitate this plea.

In September, Macek was linked to the Lossman murders after Nancy Lossman's body was exhumed and the bite marks re-tested by four forensic experts, leading to them being matched back to him. In early October, he was sentenced to a 50-to-70-year sentence for the attempted murder against Sharon Kulisek.

=== Murders ===
On December 24, 1976, it was announced that Macek would stand trial for the murder of Paula Cupit, with his trial date set for January 24, 1977. The trial lasted almost a month, at the end of which he was sentenced to life imprisonment after pleading guilty to the murder charge, a sentence that was to be served concurrently with his other sentences in Wisconsin. As a result of his guilty plea, additional charges of rape and mayhem were dropped.

In early April, Macek was extradited to Illinois, where he was arraigned for the murders of Nancy and Lisa Lossman, to which he pleaded not guilty. Due to the fact that he had all of his teeth removed sometime after the murders, Macek was ordered to undergo procedures in which specialists took X-rays of his mouth and made plaster models of his gums to compare them with the bite marks found on Nancy Lossman's body. His initial trial was delayed to September 12, as Judge Ronald Herrmann granted a request by Macek's attorney to consult a forensic odontologist in regards to the mouth X-rays. In November, in exchange for a guilty plea in which he admitted killing Nancy and would have all charges dropped in regards to Lisa's murder, Macek was convicted and sentenced to 200-to-400 years imprisonment.

== Other possible victims ==
Shortly after his conviction for the attempted murder, Dr. Lowell Levine, one of the four forensic experts involved in the Lossman indictment, suggested that Macek might be linked to the 1972 murder of 14-year-old Sally Kandel. Kandel was found beaten to death in a cornfield west of her home in Carol Stream, Illinois, on September 12, 1972, and prosecutors used circumstantial evidence - including bite marks - to convict 25-year-old Richard Milone for her murder. Milone was sentenced to an 80-to-175-year prison sentence, but maintained that he was innocent. In contrast to his colleagues, Levine maintained that the bite marks on Kandel originated from Macek, not Milone. This claim was heavily contested by prosecutors involved in the case as well as the other forensic experts, all of whom contended that Milone was the killer. Almost immediately after his conviction for the Lossman murders, it was reported that Macek supposedly sent a letter to Milone's parents in which he confessed to being Kandel's killer, but the existence of this supposed letter was never confirmed.

Aside from this murder, the McHenry County Sheriff also announced that he considered Macek a possible suspect in the 1975 death of Cindy Becker, a woman from McHenry whose body was found in the Nippersink Creek near Spring Grove. Macek was her neighbor at one time, but was never charged as there was not enough evidence to bring him to trial for this crime.

One article claimed that Macek was investigated for at least nine murders at one point, and that he had even confessed to at least one additional murder to a psychiatrist. This was the murder of 18-year-old Michele Baker, who was found drowned in a creek in McHenry on July 4, 1975. He was never charged with this crime either.

He was also briefly considered as a possible suspect in the 1968 murder of university student Christine Rothschild, who was also killed in a sexually motivated murder at the University of Wisconsin–Madison.

== Incarceration and suicide ==
After his conviction, several people involved in the cases against Macek were interviewed, with them sharing a similar sentiment in saying that he could not be rehabilitated, but still apparently showed willingness to cooperate in the form of allowing doctors to examine him to determine what drove him to kill. During his incarceration at the Central State Hospital in Waupun, he was housed in an individual room in what was described as relative luxury, as he had access to a variety of furniture and recreational activities, worked as a chef in the kitchen for some time and even applied for social security.

On March 2, 1987, while incarcerated at the Dodge Correctional Institution, Macek hanged himself in his jail cell using shoestrings attached to an air vent. His body was found by warden Gordon Abrahamson in the early morning, and after he failed to resuscitate him, he brought the inmate to the Waupun Memorial Hospital, where he was pronounced dead. His death was met with relief from investigators and family members of his victims, with one of Det. George Hendle stating in an interview that he had no sympathy for Macek and wished he had been sentenced to death for his crimes.

== See also ==
- List of serial killers in the United States

== Books ==
- Helen Morrison and Harold Goldberg (2009). My Life Among the Serial Killers : Inside the Minds of the World's Most Notorious Murderers. HarperCollins. ISBN 9780061809590.
