= Académie de musique du Québec =

Nonprofit association in Montreal, Canada

The Académie de musique du Québec (French pronunciation: [akademi də myzik dy kebɛk], Quebec Music Academy) is a nonprofit association based in Montreal, Canada, founded in 1868. It was built by order of Queen Victoria in 1870 and brought together the most renowned musicians of Quebec.

The objectives of the academy are to promote the love of music, to raise the level of musical studies and to establish programs. It also conducts exams and awards diplomas and certificates in all disciplines of music education.

In 2011 the Prix d'Europe contest celebrated its 100th anniversary and each year offers the winner a $25,000 scholarship, awarded by the Ministry of Culture, Communications and Status of Women of Quebec. This competition is open to instrumentalists and singers from Quebec. Every two years, since 2009, the contest also awards young composers the Fernand-Lindsay Award, a scholarship of $10,000 offered by the Father Lindsay Foundation. Many other prizes are also awarded.

The Prix d'Europe competition aims to encourage young musicians to hone their craft and pursue their musical studies outside of Quebec.

== Former presidents ==
- Ernest Gagnon, 1868–71, 1874–76, 1887–88, 1889–90
- Frederick William Mills, 1871–72
- Pierre-M. Lagacé, 1872–74
- Calixa Lavallée, 1876–77, 1879–80
- Frantz Jehin-Prume, 1877–78
- Gustave Gagnon, 1878–79, 1881–82, 1883–84, 1885–87, 1893–94, 1895–96, 1897–98, 1899–1900, 1901–02
- P.R. MacLagan, 1880–81
- Paul Letondal, 1882–83, 1888–89
- Romain-Octave Pelletier, 1884–85, 1894–95, 1902–04, 1909–10, 1915–16
- L.-A. Maffré, 1890–91
- Edward Arthur Bishop, 1891–92
- Émery Lavigne, 1892–93, 1900–01
- Dominique Ducharme, 1896–97
- Arthur Letondal, 1898–99, 1905–06, 1913–14, 1920–23
- Arthur Lavigne, 1904–05, 1906–07, 1908–09
- Joseph Saucier, 1907–08, 1911–12
- J.-Arthur Bernier, 1910–11, 1912–13
- Joseph Vézina, 1914–15
- Arthur Laurendeau, 1916–18, 1926–29
- J.-Alexandre Gilbert, 1918–20, 1941–44
- Léon J. Dessane, 1923–26
- Henri Gagnon, 1929–32
- Frédéric Pelletier, 1932–35
- Omer Létourneau, 1935–38
- Auguste Descarries, 1938–41
- Edmond Trudel, 1944–47, 1950–52
- Edwin Bélanger, 1947–50, 1953–56, 1963–65, 1971–74
- Gabriel Cusson, 1952–53, 1956–59
- Joseph Turgeon, 1959–62
- Jean Papineau-Couture, 1962–63
- Raymond Daveluy, 1965–71
- Gaston Arel, 1974–80, 1981–84, 1987–88
- Lise Desrosiers, 1980–81
- Louise André, 1984–87
- Francoise Bertrand, 1990-2002
- Monik Grenier, 2002-2003
- Richard Raymond, 2003-2004
- Jean Marchand, 2005-2008
- Richard Proulx, 2008-2010
- Lise Boucher, 2010–present

=== Archives ===
- The archives of the Quebec Music Academy is held at the Québec archives centre of the Bibliothèque et Archives nationales du Québec.
