= Romain-Octave Pelletier =

Romain-Octave Pelletier may refer to:

- Romain-Octave Pelletier I (1843–1927), Canadian organist, pianist, composer, writer on music, and music educator
- Romain-Octave Pelletier II (1904–1968), Canadian music critic, music producer, and violinist
