= Frantz Jehin-Prume =

Canadian violinist, composer and music educator of Belgian birth

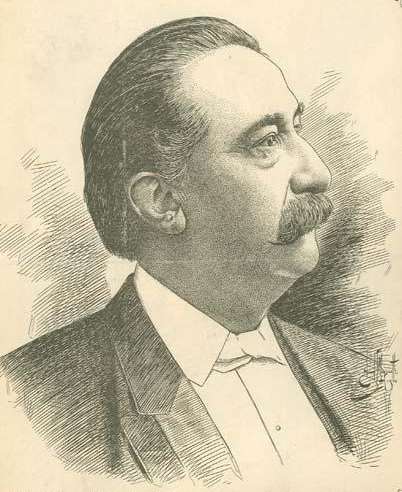
Frantz Jehin-Prume (drawing by Edmond-Joseph Massicotte)

Frantz Jehin-Prume (18 April 1839 – 29 May 1899) was a Canadian violinist, composer, and music educator of Belgian birth. He began his career as a highly successful concert violinist in Europe. From 1865 on he lived and worked mainly in Montreal, Canada; becoming one of the most important 19th-century musical figures in Quebec. He became a naturalized Canadian citizen in 1868.

== Early life and career in Europe ==
Born François-Henri Jehin in Spa, he was from a family of musicians. Both of his grandfathers were organists and his uncle was the violinist François Prume; the latter of whom he studied under as a boy at the Liège Conservatory. He was a pupil of Hubert Léonard and François-Joseph Fétis at the Royal Conservatory of Brussels. From 1852 to 1863 he had a highly successful career as a concert violinist throughout Europe and Russia; performing in the courts of several monarchs and with the great orchestras of the day.

== Early career in North America ==
In 1864, Jehin-Prume came to Mexico at the invitation of Emperor Maximilian I. After performing for four months there in numerous concerts, he briefly toured to Brazil and Cuba. In May 1865 he came to New York City where he appeared in recital. The following year he returned to New York to appear in concerts with the New York Philharmonic.

In June 1865 Jehin-Prume came to Canada for the first time to visit his friend, violinist Jules Hone, for a fishing and hunting vacation. During that time he performed at a benefit concert for the Jesuits in Montreal with Romain-Octave Pelletier I as his accompanist. The reception was so positive to his performance, that he soon found himself engaged for numerous concerts in Montreal's major performance venues over the succeeding months. What initially was supposed to be a short visit to Canada, turned into a permanent home; a fact solidified by his marriage to Montreal mezzo-soprano Rosita del Vecchio in July 1866. Their son, Jules Jehin-Prume, was a successful doctor and playwright.

From 1865 to 1867, Jehin-Prume and his wife toured throughout Canada and the United States. They notably were invited by President Andrew Johnson to perform at the White House in January 1867. In 1868 they toured to Cuba and Belgium and in 1869-1870 they toured to 59 cities in North America with singer Carlotta Patti and pianist Théodore Ritter. He spent little time outside of Canada after the conclusion of this tour.

== Later life and career in Montreal ==
Jehin-Prume played a major role in the development of the Montreal music scene from the 1870s through the 1890s. He was active as a chamber musician in concerts of string quartets and trios. He was a close friend and collaborator of Calixa Lavallée under whom he served as concertmaster in a 58-piece orchestra during the late 1870s. He was the first concertmaster of the Montreal Philharmonic Society and served as the president of the Académie de musique du Québec in 1877–1878. In 1892 he founded the first professional chamber music society in Quebec, the Association artistique de Montréal, which mounted a total of 31 concerts before it disbanded in May 1896. He gave his last public concert on 16 May 1896 with pianist Victoria Cartier. He was also active as a teacher and counts several notable musicians among his pupils, including François Boucher, Alfred De Sève, Béatrice La Palme, and Émile Taranto.

He died in Montreal, Quebec, Canada, on 29 May 1899.
