= Romain Pelletier =

Canadian organist, choir conductor, composer and music educator

Romain Pelletier (sometimes spelled Peltier) (22 August 1875 – 24 November 1953) was a Canadian organist, choir conductor, composer, and music educator. His compositional output consists entirely of works for solo organ and motets. He was a founding member of the Société des artistes musiciens de Montréal and was a much admired teacher of counterpoint, fugue, and the organ.

== Life and career ==
Born in Montreal, Pelletier was part of a prominent musical family in Quebec. He was the son of musician Romain-Octave Pelletier I, the brother of composer and conductor Frédéric Pelletier, and the uncle of violinist Romain-Octave Pelletier II. His other brother Victor was a cellist in J.-J. Goulet's Montreal Symphony Orchestra of which he also served as music librarian.

Pelletier studied the piano and organ in his native city with Arthur Letondal and was a singing and harmony student of Achille Fortier. In 1909 he became organist/choirmaster at Saint-Léon de Westmount Church, a position he held through 1951. He taught throughout his career, both privately and at the Institut Nazareth. Among his notable students are Fleurette Beauchamp, Gabriel Cusson, Guillaume Dupuis, Conrad Letendre, and Georges-Émile Tanguay.
