= Marie Daveluy =

Canadian opera singer (born 1936)

- Born: March 20, 1936 (age 89); Victoriaville, Quebec, Canada
- Genres: Opera
- Occupation(s): Singer, music educator
- Instrument: Voice (soprano)

Marie Daveluy (French pronunciation: [maʁi davlɥi]; born 1936) is a Canadian opera singer and music educator from Quebec.

== Early life and education ==
Marie Marguerite Cécile Alice Louise Daveluy was born to Lucien Daveluy and Renée Dunn in Victoriaville, Quebec. She is the sister of organist Raymond Daveluy. Daveluy's grandfather Adolphe Daveluy founded the town of Daveluyville, Quebec.

Marie Daveluy began her musical studies with Gabriel Cusson, and voice studies with Martial Singher at the Conservatoire de musique du Québec à Montréal in 1953. Supported by scholarships from the governments of Quebec and Canada, she traveled to Vienna in 1956 for graduate studies with Ferdinand Grossmann and Viktor Graef.

== Career ==
In 1959, Daveluy made her debut with the Salzburg Opera, singing the role of Zerbinetta in Ariadne auf Naxos. She went on to sing with the Heidelberg Opera, singing about 30 roles in the years 1961-66.

Marie Daveluy was a professor of voice at the Université du Québec à Trois-Rivières from 1971 to 1984, and at the Conservatoire de musique de Montréal from 1973. She taught the interpretation of Lieder from 1974 to 1981. Her former students include singers Marie-Nicole Lemieux, Karina Gauvin, and Leslie Ann Bradley.

In collaboration with pianist Diane Mauger she recorded songs by composer Jean Chatillon (L'Oiseau-Coeur OC S-01) in 1974 and songs by Rodolphe Mathieu for the LP Musique québécoise 'nos compositeurs' (L'Oiseau-Coeur OC S-02, 1977).
