= William Reed (Canadian musician) =

Canadian organist and composer (1859–1945)

William Reed (9 September 1859 – 2 November 1945) was a Canadian organist, choir conductor, and composer. He held numerous organ and choirmaster posts in churches throughout Canada from 1884 until 1913. His career in this area was cut short as his deafness worsened. He spent the remainder of his career composing and contributing articles to music periodicals like The Etude. His compositional output mainly consists of sacred works, including many anthems and works for solo organ. His more well known works include the Christmas cantata The Message of the Angels (1910), the cantata The Burden of the Cross (1912), the Easter cantata The Resurrection and the Life (1911), and the Grand Choeur in D for organ (1901). His pupil Henri Gagnon considered the latter work "one of the very best Canadian compositions".

== Life and career ==
Born in Montreal, Reed studied the organ in his youth with Romain-Octave Pelletier I and Dominique Ducharme. At the age of 19 he was awarded a scholarship to attend Keble College, one of the constituent colleges of the University of Oxford, in England. He served as the college's organist during the late 1870s and early 1880s, having beat out more than 30 applicants for the post.

After returning to Canada, Reed served as the organist/choirmaster at St Peter's Anglican Church in Sherbrooke, Quebec, from 1884 until 1888. He then returned to his native city to assume similar posts at American Presbyterian Church and St John the Baptist Church in 1888/1889. In 1899/1900, he was organist at St. Andrew's Church in Toronto, and in 1901 he was guest organist at the Pan-American Exposition in Buffalo, New York. From 1900 until 1913 he served as the organist/choirmaster at Chalmers-Wesley United Church and St. Andrew's Church in Quebec City. He died in Quebec City in 1945.
