= Georges-Alphonse Monette =

Canadian architect (1870–1941)

Georges-Alphonse Monette (13 March 1870, Montréal —16 July 1941, Montréal) was a Canadian architect who worked mainly in his native city of Montréal. He apprenticed in Montréal with architect Alexander Francis Dunlop in the 1880s before becoming a foreman at the architectural firm Perrault and Mesnard. He left this firm in 1895 to start his own business which he operated successfully into the 1920s.

Monette's most notable works were mainly religious buildings, including the Church of Saint-Léon-de-Westmount (1901-1903) and the Précieux-Sang à Notre-Dame-de-Grâce (1902). He also designed convents, rectories, schools, and residential buildings while in Montreal. From 1918 to 1925 he served as the president of the Association of Architects of the Province of Quebec (AAPQ).
