= Djane Lavoie-Herz =

- Born: Djane Lavoie; 20 October 1888; Ottawa, Ontario
- Died: 2 March 1982 (age 93) Sydney, Australia
- Occupations: Pianist, teacher
- Instrument: Piano

Djane Lavoie-Herz (20 October 1888– 2 March 1982) was a Canadian pianist and teacher.

== Life and career ==
According to the Illinois, U.S., Federal Naturalization Records, 1856-1991, Djane Lavoie-Herz was born on 20 October 1888 in Ottawa, Ontario. She studied in Montreal with Alfred La Liberté and then went to Europe where she studied in London, Paris, Berlin (where she studied with Artur Schnabel), and Brussels (where she studied with Alexander Scriabin). Through Scriabin’s influence, Herz became interested in Theosophy, a religious movement. The ideas of theosophy were deeply intertwined with Scriabin’s compositions, in which dissonant harmony was seen as spiritual.

In 1918, after having studied with Scriabin for two years, Herz moved to Chicago. In 1920, she founded a salon on Grand Boulevard, where she hosted soirees that featured Scriabin’s music and discussions of theosophy. These salons were attended by musicians including Henry Cowell, Dane Rudhyar, and Carl Ruggles.

In 1924, Djane Lavoie-Herz began to teach American pianist and composer Ruth Crawford Seeger, to whom she introduced the music of Scriabin and the ideas of theosophy. Herz’s mentorship was a formative part of Seeger’s journey as a composer. It was through Herz that Seeger met Dane Rudhyar and Henry Cowell, who also had an impact on her career. Composer Vivian Fine also studied piano with Djane Lavoie-Herz in the 1920s, and later studied harmony and composition with Ruth Crawford Seeger.

In her later life, no longer able to care for herself, she relocated to Sydney, Australia to live with her son. She died there on 2 March 1982.
