= Dominique Ducharme (musician) =

Canadian musician (1840–1899)

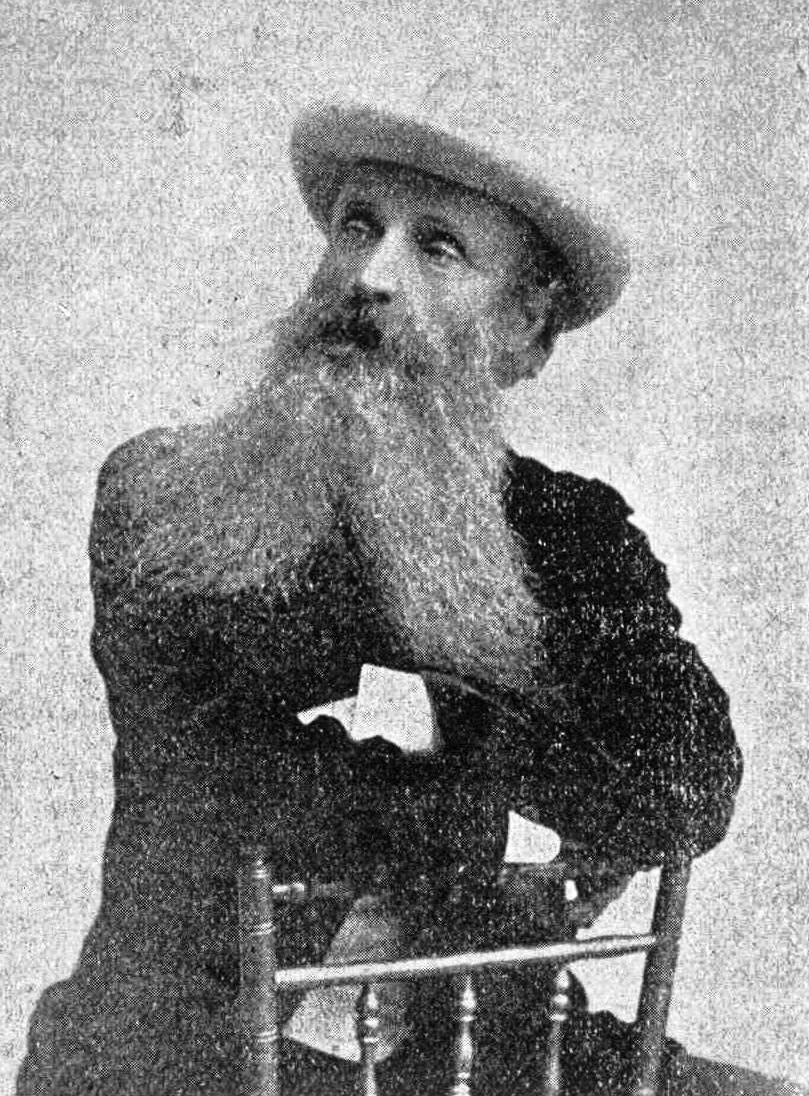
- Born: 14 May 1840
- Died: 28 December 1899 (aged 59)
- Education: Conservatoire de Paris

Dominique Ducharme (French pronunciation: [dɔminik dyʃaʁm]; 14 May 1840 - 28 December 1899) was a Canadian pianist, organist, and music educator.

== Biography ==
He studied with Paul Letondal and Charles Wugk Sabatier in Canada before studying for 5 years at the Conservatoire de Paris in France with Antoine Marmontel and François Bazin. In Europe he became acquainted with several notable musicians who influenced his piano and organ technique, including Franz Liszt and Camille Saint-Saëns.

He later befriended Ignacy Jan Paderewski in 1889; a relationship which added to his piano teaching the methodology of the Viennese school. He was the organist at the Église du Gesù in Montreal from 1869-1898. In 1896-1897 he was the President of the Académie de musique du Québec. A celebrated piano teacher, his students included Édouard Clarke, Achille Fortier, Alfred La Liberté, William Reed, Émiliano Renaud, and Joseph Saucier.
