= Raymond Daveluy =

Canadian musician (1926–2016)

Joseph Eugène Raymond-Marie Daveluy CM (French pronunciation: [ʒozɛf øʒɛn ʁɛmɔ̃ maʁi davlɥi]; 23 December 1926 – 1 September 2016) was a Canadian composer, organist, music educator, and arts administrator. An associate composer of the Canadian Music Centre, his compositional output consisted mainly of works for solo organ. He had an active international career as a recitalist and concert performer from 1946 through the 1990s. He held a number of church posts in Montreal, including serving as organist of St-Jean-Baptiste Church (1946–1951), Immaculée-Conception Church (1951–1954), and St-Sixte Church (1954–1959). In 1980, he was named a Member of the Order of Canada. He was married to pianist Hilda Metcalfe.

== Career ==
Born in Victoriaville, Quebec, Daveluy was the son of organist and bandmaster Lucien Daveluy, with whom he began his initial musical studies at the age of 11. His sister Marie Daveluy had a successful career as a classical soprano. From 1939–1946 he studied music theory privately with Gabriel Cusson in Montreal and was also a pupil of organist Conrad Letendre from 1942–1948. He was awarded the Prix d'Europe in 1948 which enabled him to pursue further studies in organ performance with Hugh Giles in New York City.

Daveluy assumed charge of the large Rudolf von Beckerath organ at Saint Joseph's Oratory in Montreal from 1960 to 2002. He also served as the assistant director of the Conservatoire de musique du Québec à Montréal (CMQM) from 1967–1970 and later was president of the school from 1974–1978. He also taught classes at the CMQM from 1957–1960 and from 1978–1988. He held the post of president of the Académie de musique du Québec from 1965–1971 and served as director of the Conservatoire de musique du Québec à Trois-Rivières from 1970–1974. He also taught organ courses periodically at McGill University from the late 1960s through the 1980s. Among his notable pupils are Pierre-Yves Asselin, Paul Crawford, Mireille Lagacé, Lucienne L'Heureux-Arel, and Rachel Laurin.

He made a memorable visit to England at the invitation of Martin Neary to give an outstanding recital and performance on the organ of Winchester Cathedral, including a lengthy extemporisation on a theme provided by Anthony Caesar. At its conclusion, the theme was revealed to be one of the Cathedral’s (rarely heard) mechanical bell tunes, played on the bells - a dramatic moment.
