= Saint-Jean-Baptiste Church (Quebec City) =

Catholic church in Quebec City

Coordinates: 46°48′34″N 71°13′20″W

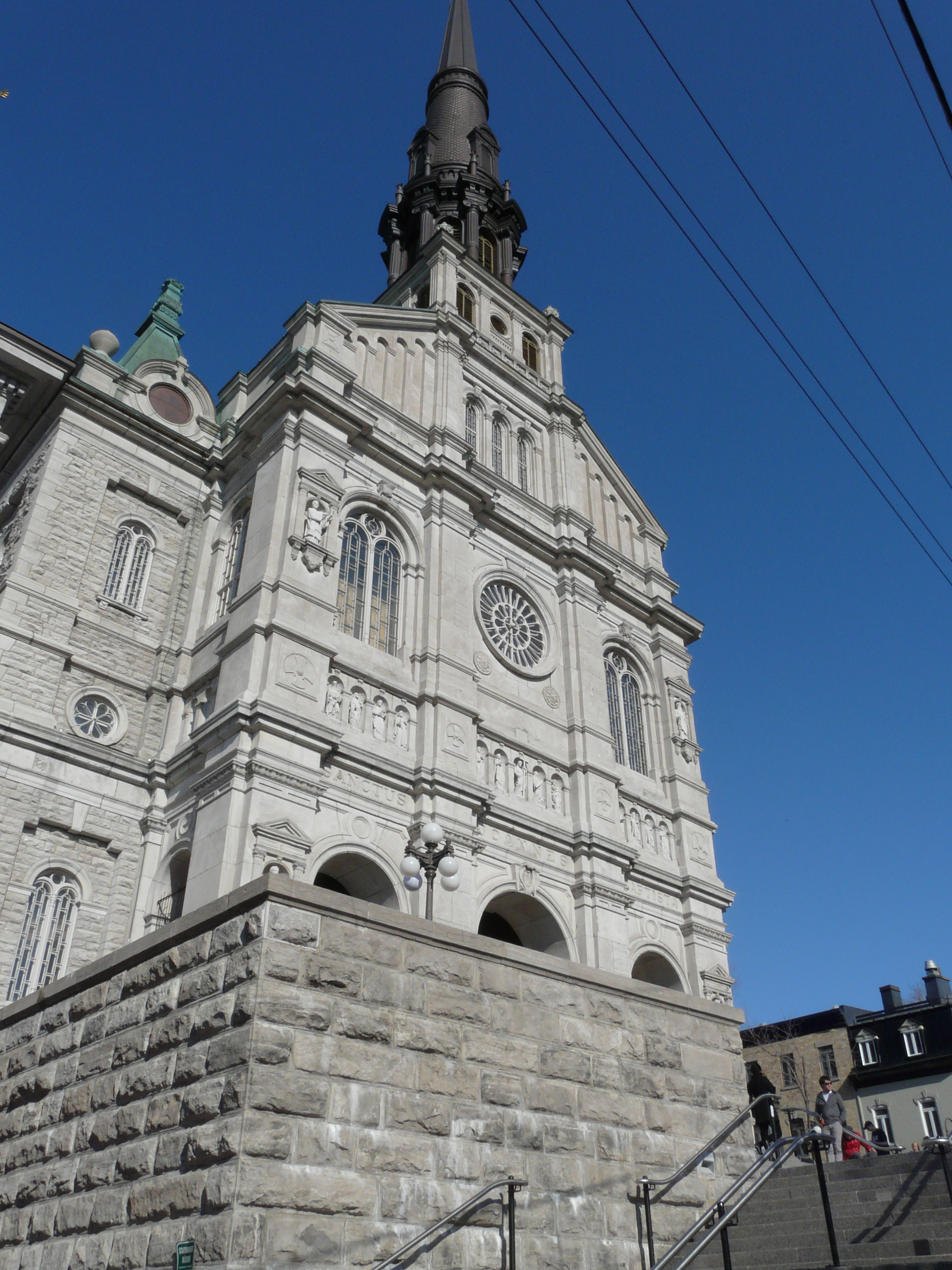
Saint-Jean-Baptiste Church

Saint-Jean-Baptiste Church was a church in Quebec City, Quebec located at 410 Rue Saint-Jean.

== History ==
The original structure was completed in 1847, but a disastrous fire that leveled much of the city in 1881 destroyed it completely. The current church was built in 1884 out of seven types of Italian marble. Designed by architect Joseph-Ferdinand Peachy in the Second Empire style, the church was inspired by the facade of the Église de la Sainte-Trinité in Paris. It features a 240 ft (73 m) spire, 36 stained-glass windows, and dozens of statues and paintings, among other ornate decorations. The Gagnon brothers were both organists at the church; Ernest Gagnon from 1853 to 1864 and Gustave Gagnon from 1864 to 1876. The Archdiocese of Quebec closed this church on Pentecost of 2015.

== Interior ==
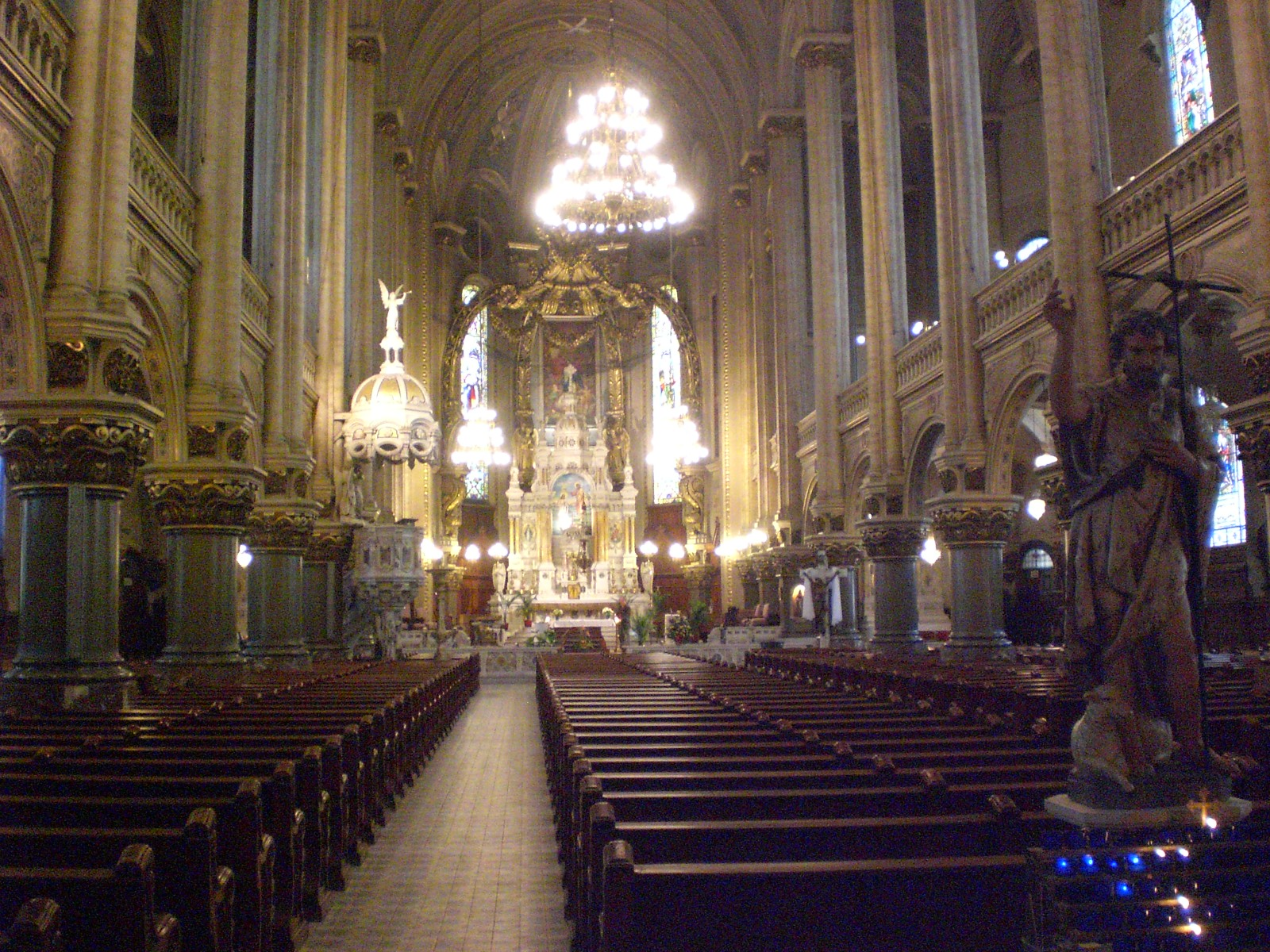
Nave

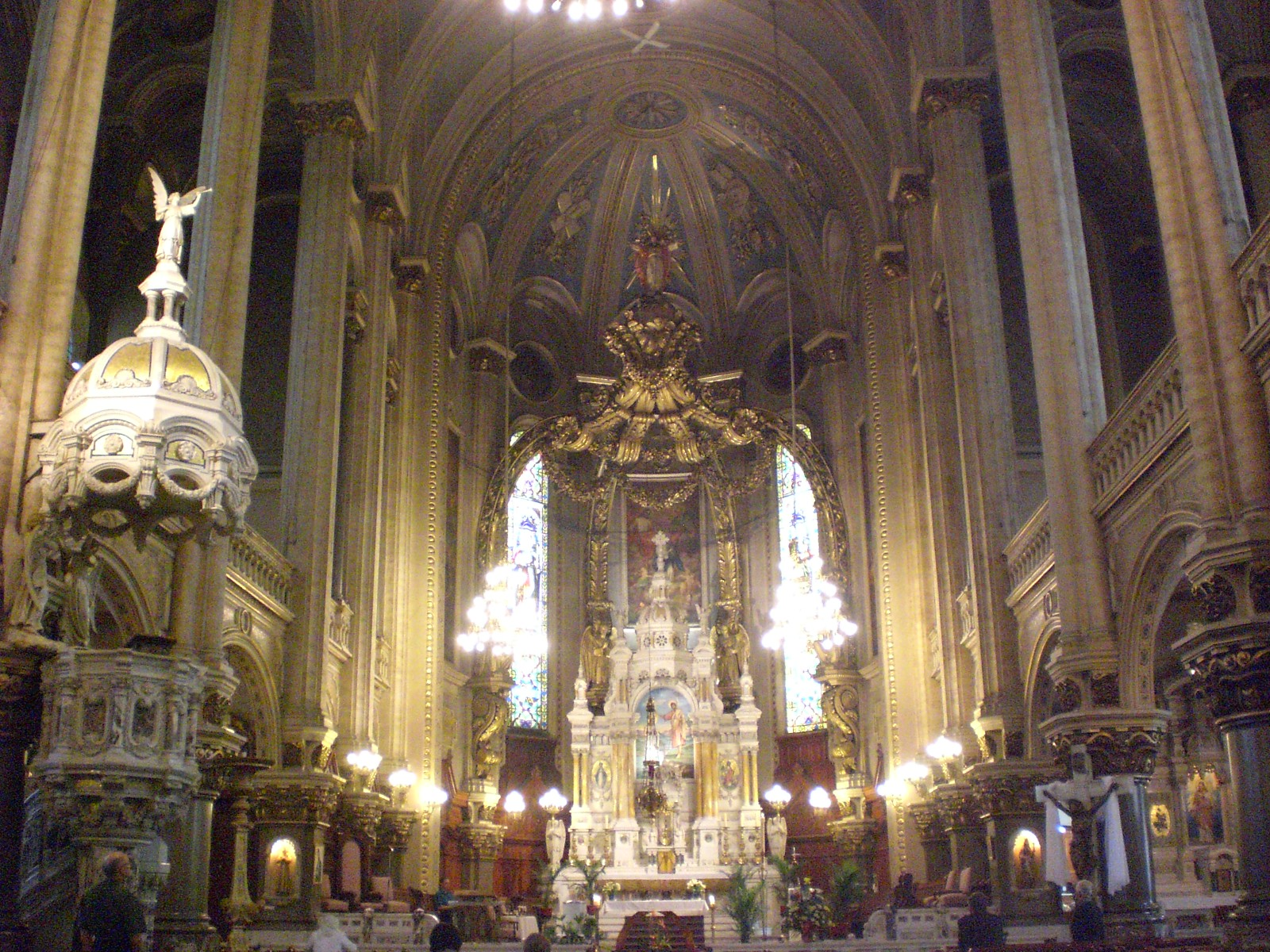
Sanctuary and pulpit

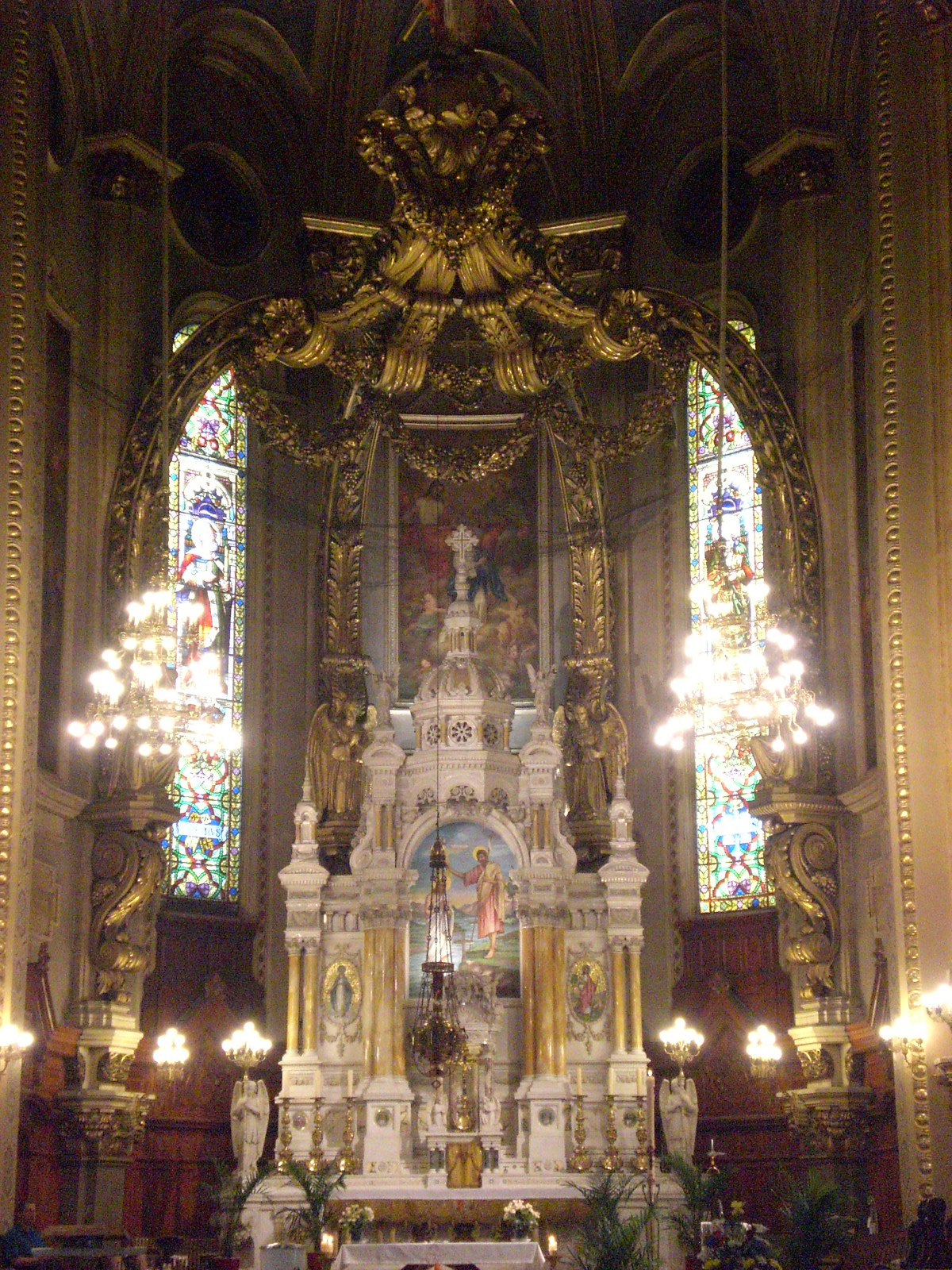
Altar
