= Chalmers-Wesley United Church =

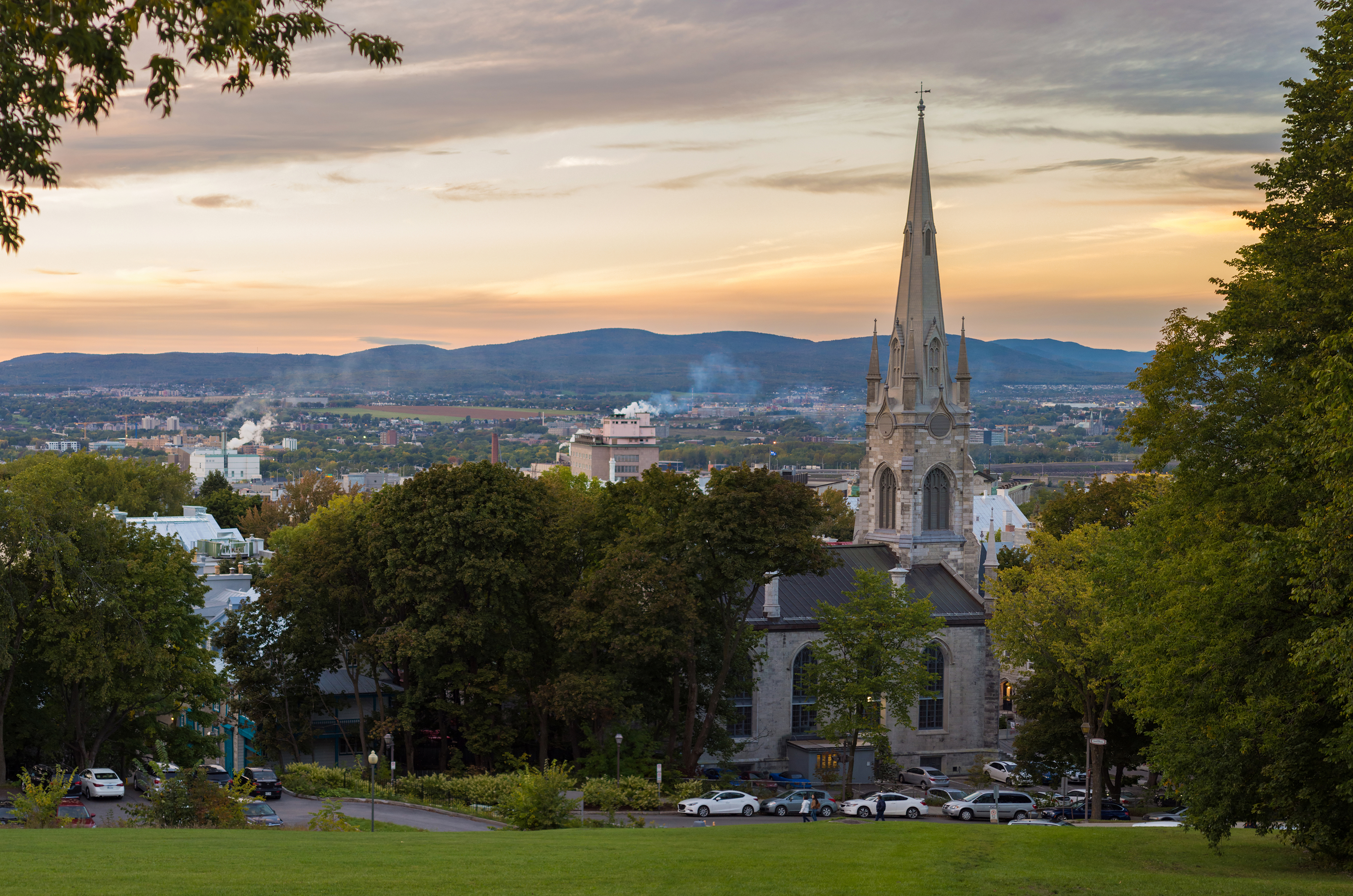
- Chalmers-Wesley United Church on rue Sainte-Ursule in the Upper Town of Old Quebec.

- Location of Chalmers-Wesley United Church in Quebec City
- 46.81006°N 71.20901°W
- Location: 78, rue Sainte-Ursule; Quebec City, Quebec; G1R 4E8
- Denomination: United Church of Canada
- Website: chalmerswesleyunited.ca

History
- Status: Church

Architecture
- Functional status: Active
- Architect: John Wells
- Groundbreaking: 1851
- Completed: 1853

Chalmers-Wesley United Church (French: Église Unie Chalmers-Wesley) is a Protestant church located within the walls of Old Quebec at 78, rue Sainte-Ursule in Quebec City, Quebec, Canada. Designed by architect John Wells for the Free Presbyterian Church of Canada, the church was built from 1851-1853 and opened for worship on March 6, 1853. It is particularly admired for its Gothic Revival design.

In 1925, the church became part of the newly formed United Church of Canada. Composer William Reed was notably the church's organist from 1900-1913. In 1931, the congregation of the nearby Wesleyan Methodist Church, which had also become part of The United Church of Canada, merged with Chalmers United Church and was renamed Chalmers-Wesley United Church.
