= Charles Wugk Sabatier =

Canadian pianist, organist, composer and music educator of French birth

Charles-Désiré-Joseph Wugk Sabatier (1 December 1819 – 22 August 1862) was a Canadian pianist, organist, composer, and music educator of French birth.

== Early life and career in Europe ==
Born Charles Wugk in Tourcoing, Sabatier was the son of an immigrant from Saxony. He enrolled at the Conservatoire de Paris under his birth name in 1838, studying there through 1840. He adopted the last name of Sabatier some time during his early career. An article in the Toronto Globe published on 25 September 1856 claimed that Sabatier was pianist to the Duchess of Montpensier and that he had conducted opera in Brussels. The former account is most likely accurate but music historians largely reject the latter claim.

== Life and career in Canada ==
Sabatier most likely arrived in Canada in 1848, although an exact year is not definitely substantiated. He first resided in the city of Montreal and then lived in Quebec City from 1854 to 1856. During these years he worked as a music teacher, church organist, and concert pianist for both public and private performances. He played concerts of his own work as a guest artist at St Lawrence Hall in Toronto in 1856. His composition Le Drapeau de Carillon was published in the Journal de Québec for St Jean-Baptiste Day in 1858. He lived in a variety of cities over the next several years, first in St-Jean-Chrysostome-de-Lévis and then in St-Gervais and Chambly. In the latter city he was employed at a convent as an instructor in music.

Sabatier ultimately settled in Montreal where he remained for the rest of his life. In that city he worked as a private music teacher and counted pianist Dominique Ducharme, organist Ernest Gagnon, and composer Calixa Lavallée among his students. He founded the short-lived journal L'Artiste with Paul Stevens and Édouard Sempé in May 1860. On 24 August 1860 his Cantata (with words by Sempé) was premiered under his direction on the occasion of the visit of the Prince of Wales. For the performance he conducted the 250 voice Montreal Musical Union Choir and a full orchestra. The soloists for the cantata included Adelina Patti and Emma Albani.

Sabatier died in Montreal in 1862 at the age of 42.
