= Church of Saint-Léon-de-Westmount =

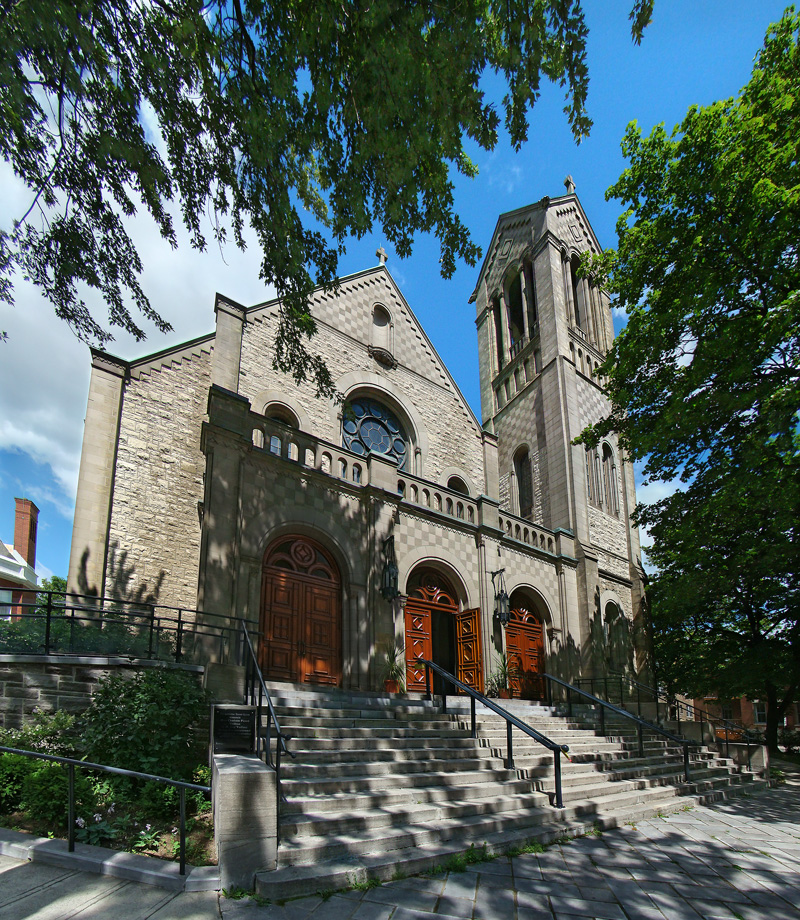
- Saint-Léon de Westmount Church
- Church of Saint-Léon-de-Westmount
- 45°29′08″N 73°35′31″W
- Location: Westmount, Quebec
- Country: Canada
- Denomination: Catholic Church

History
- Status: active
- Founded: 1901

Architecture
- Architect: Georges-Alphonse Monette;
- Architectural type: Neo-Gothic

Administration
- Province: Canada

National Historic Site of Canada
- Official name: Church of Saint-Léon-de-Westmount National Historic Site of Canada
- Designated: 1997

The Church of Saint-Léon-de-Westmount (French: Église Saint-Léon de Westmount) is a Roman Catholic church located in Westmount, Quebec at 4311 De Maisonneuve Boulevard West. Built in 1901, the church was designed by well known Montreal architect Georges-Alphonse Monette and decorated by Guido Nincheri from 1901 to 1903, using the wet plaster buon fresco technique. Designed in the Romanesque Revival style, and featuring an Italianate façade with bell tower, the Church of Saint-Léon-de-Westmount was designated a National Historic Site of Canada in 1997 and plaqued in 1999.

Romain Pelletier was notably the church's organist from 1909 to 1951. His brother Frédéric Pelletier also briefly served as choirmaster at the church.

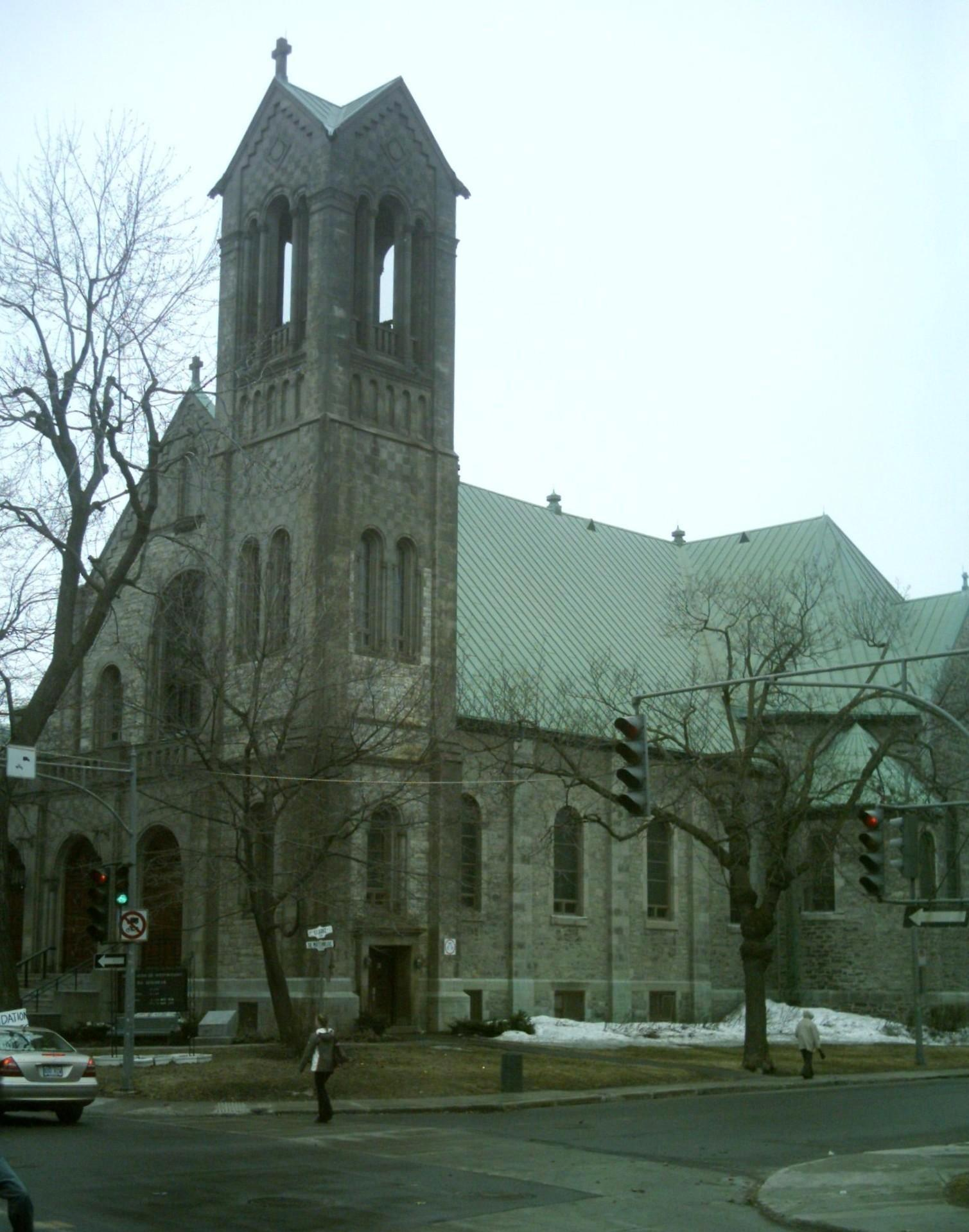
Exterior

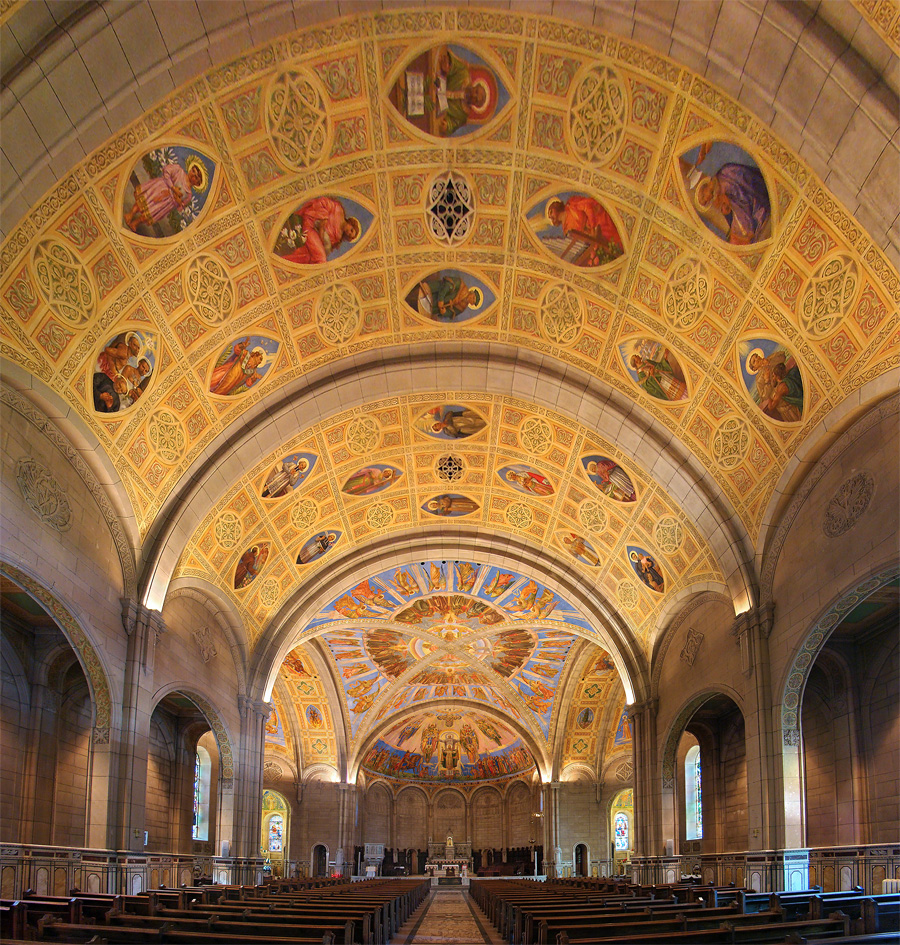
Interior

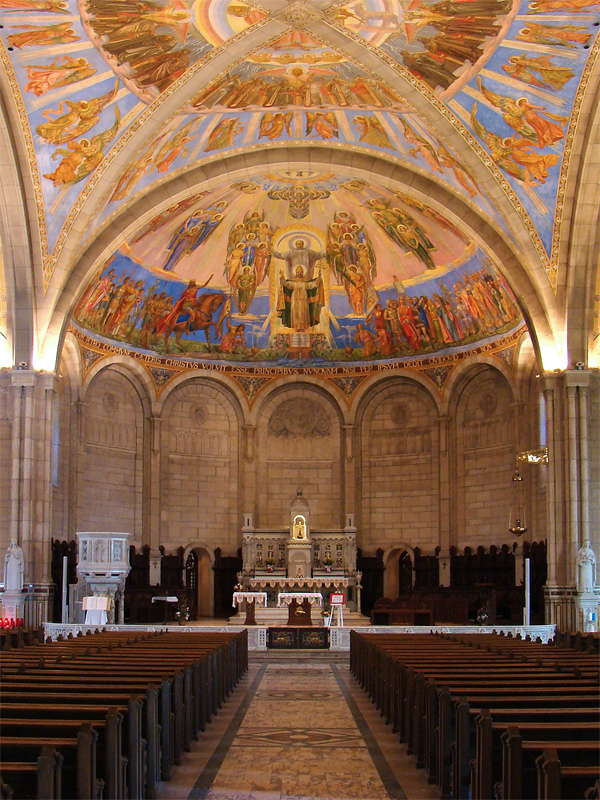
Sanctuary

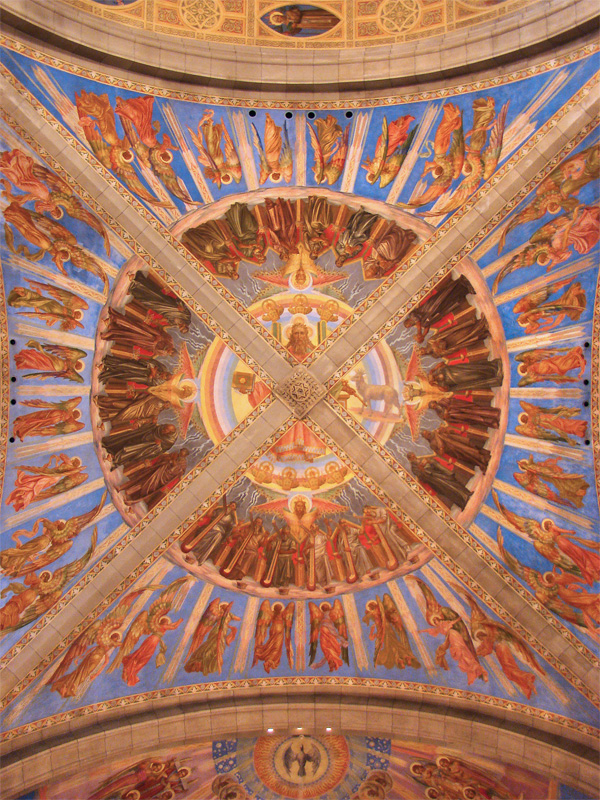
Vault

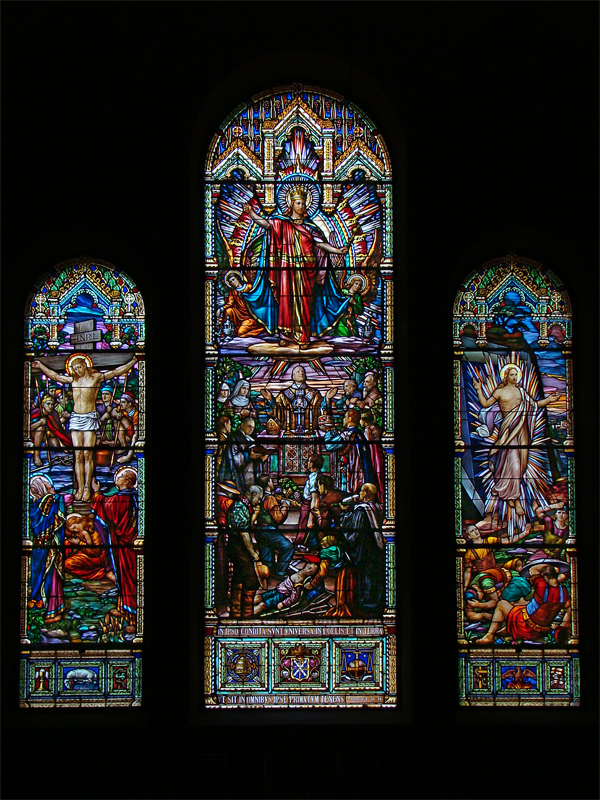
Stained-glass window

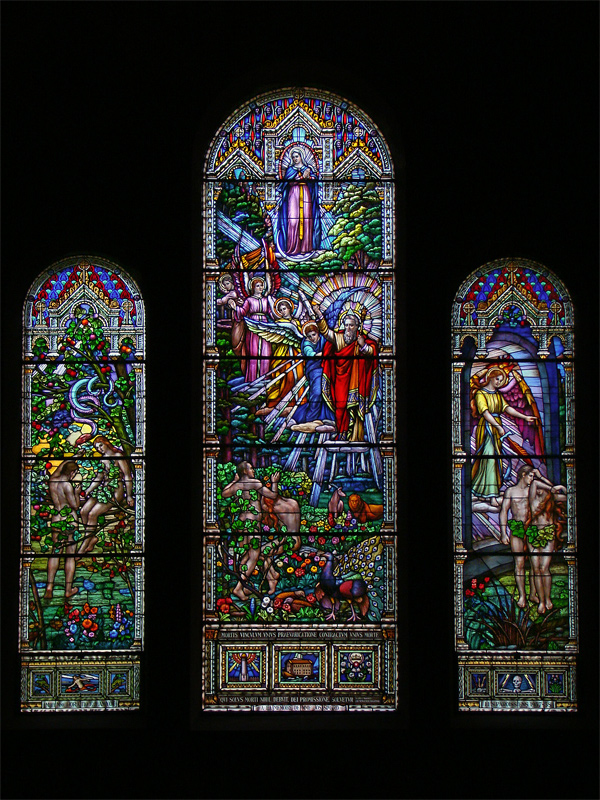
Stained-glass window

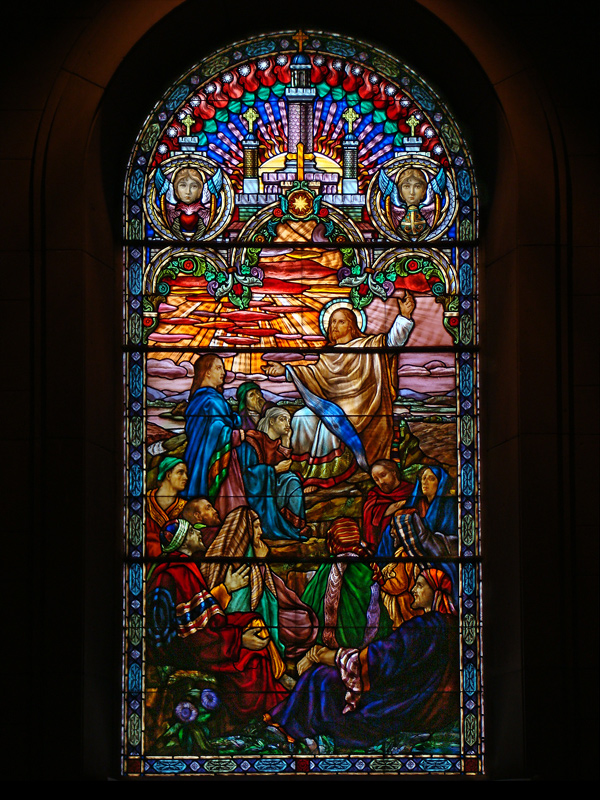
Stained-glass window

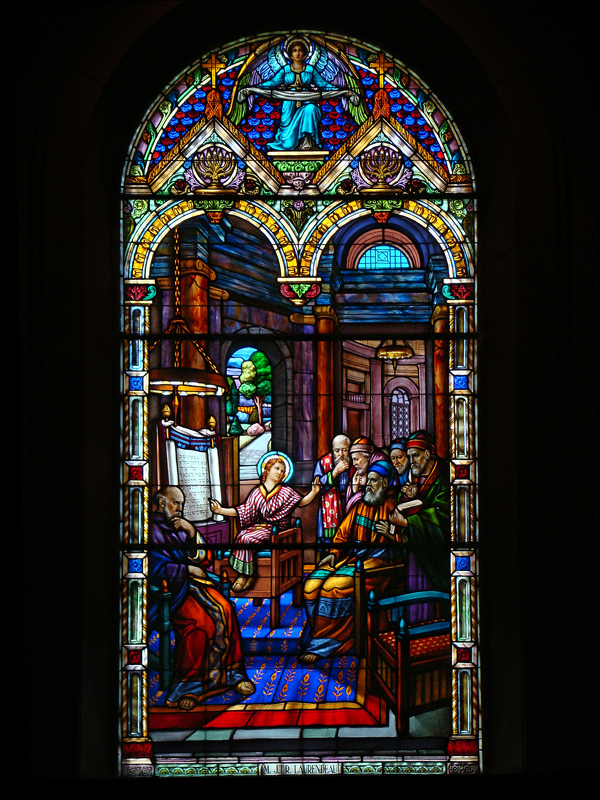
Stained-glass window
