= François Prume =

Belgian violinist and composer

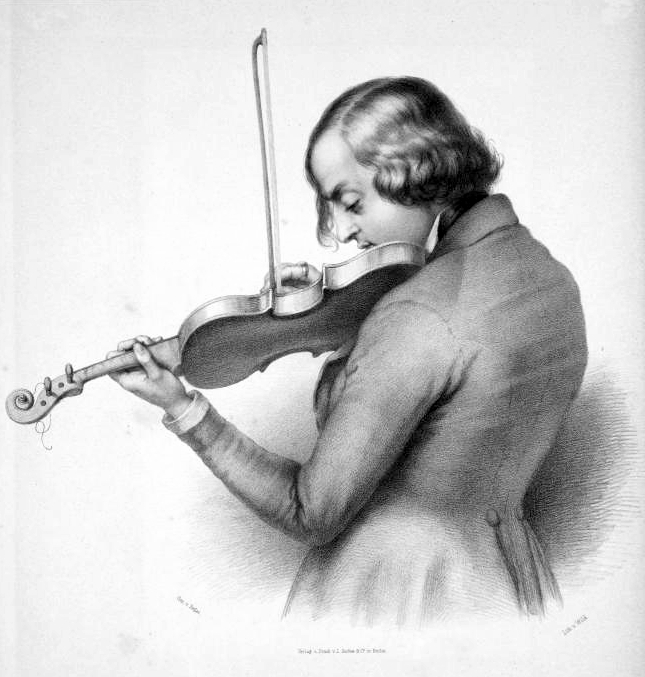
François Prume

François Hubert Prume (3 June 1816, Stavelot – 14 July 1849, Liège) was a Belgian violinist and composer.

Prume was Professor of Violin at the Royal Conservatory of Liège at the age of seventeen years, where his pupils included Hubert Léonard, and his own nephew, Frantz Jehin-Prume. His many concert tours brought him to capitals throughout Europe, during which he performed occasionally with Franz Liszt.

He received the honorary title of "Virtuoso of the Duke of Gotha". However, his career ended prematurely with his death from cholera at the age of 33. He was buried in Liège at the Cimetière de Robermont. The great hall of the former Abbey of Stavelot in his hometown was named in his memory.

== Major works ==
- Concertino for Violin and Orchestra, op. 4
- Le Petit Savoyard for Violin and Orchestra
