= Frédéric Pelletier =

Canadian musician, educator, journalist, civil servant, military officer and physician

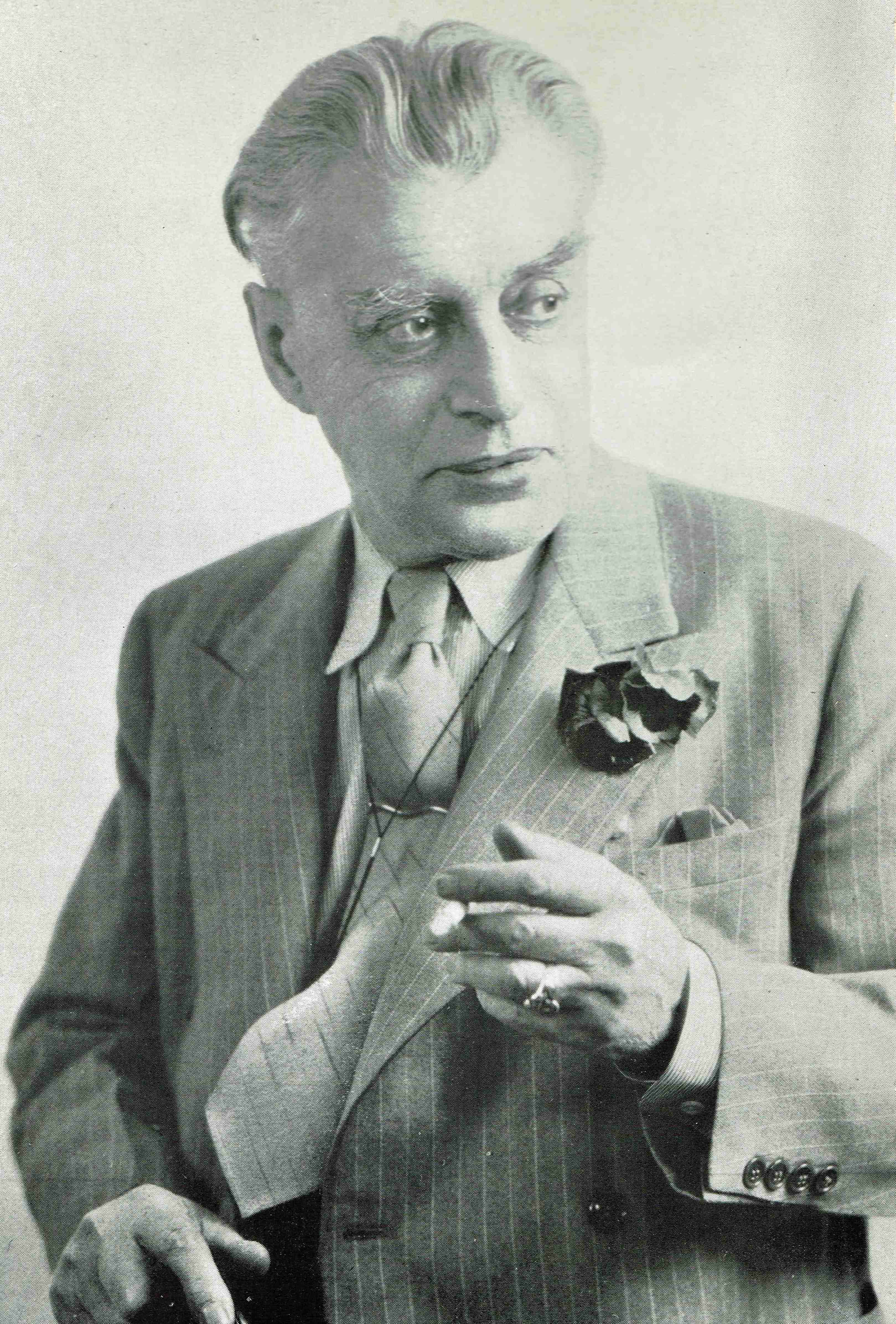
- Photo of Pelletier in 1923, published posthumously in Initiation à l'orchestre, Montréal, Éditions Fides
- Born: 1 May 1870; Montreal, Quebec, Canada
- Died: 30 May 1944 (aged 74)
- Education: Royal Military College Saint-Jean; Université de Montréal (MD)
- Occupations: choir conductor; music educator; composer; music critic; journalist; civil servant; military officer; physician
- Employers: École de musique Vincent-d'Indy; Conservatoire national de musique
- Family: Romain-Octave Pelletier I (father); Romain Pelletier (brother); Romain-Octave Pelletier II (son)

Frédéric Pelletier (1 May 1870 – 30 May 1944) was a Canadian choir conductor, music educator, composer, music critic, journalist, civil servant, military officer, and physician. He was one of the principal music critics in Montreal during the first half of the 20th century, having worked in that capacity for every major publication in Montreal at one time or another. He was also a professor of music history at several institutions and worked as a choirmaster in several Montreal churches. His compositional output was mainly dedicated to sacred choral works, including several motets and carols, two oratorios, a Requiem Mass, and a Stabat Mater. He also wrote some works for solo organ, some songs, and a number of harmonizations of Canadian folk tunes.

== Life and career ==
Born in Montreal, Pelletier was part of a prominent musical family in Quebec. He was the son of musician Romain-Octave Pelletier I, the brother of organist, composer and conductor Romain Pelletier, and the father of violinist Romain-Octave Pelletier II. His other brother Victor was a cellist in J. J. Goulet's Montreal Symphony Orchestra of which he also served as music librarian. He began his musical education as a boy studying the piano under his father. He later was a pupil of Guillaume Couture (singing) and Achille Fortier (harmony and counterpoint).

Around 1887, Pelletier entered the Royal Military College Saint-Jean and, after graduating, served as a captain in the Les Fusiliers Mont-Royal. He then entered the medical school at the Université de Montréal where he earned his MD in 1895. He operated a medical practice in Montreal for a little while, but abandoned it in favour of a career as a journalist and musician. He worked as a reporter and editor for various daily newspapers in Montreal up until 1914. He also was a music columnist for various periodicals from 1900 up until the end of his life, including La Patrie (1904–1910), La Presse (1904–1910), La Musique (1919–1921), Musical America (1923–1925), Association française d'action artistique (1920–1944), L'Art musical, La Lyre, Musical Canada and the Quinzaine musicale et artistique, among others. For Le Devoir, he authored a dozen reviews between 1911 and 1913 before being appointed its long-time music editor and critic (1916–1944).

As a musician, Pelletier was primarily active as a choir conductor. He held the post of choirmaster at several churches in Montreal, including Saint-Léon de Westmount Church (1909), St James-the-Less (1910–1936), and Sainte-Brigide de Kildare Church (1923–1924). In 1922, he founded the Saint-Saëns Choral Society, notably conducting performance that year of Samson et Dalila with Cédia Brault and Émile Gour. In 1931, he coordinated the first Canadian tour of the Paris children's choir Petits Chanteurs à la croix de bois, who included within their repertoire his Canadian folksong harmonizations. From 1932 to 1935, he served as the president of the Académie de musique du Québec, and in 1933–1934, he taught music history at the École de musique Vincent-d'Indy. He also taught that subject at the Conservatoire national de musique for a number of years.

In addition to his work as a writer and musician, Pelletier served the city of Montreal as the secretary of the department of health from 1914 to 1921. He then took the post of librarian and publicist for Quebec province's department of health in 1922, a position he held until his death in Montreal in 1944. His book Initiation à l'orchestre in Montreal was published posthumously in 1948, but his memoirs, Montréal, fin de siècle, which were intended for publication upon his death, have never been printed.
