= Alfred La Liberté =

Canadian composer and pianist (1882–1952)

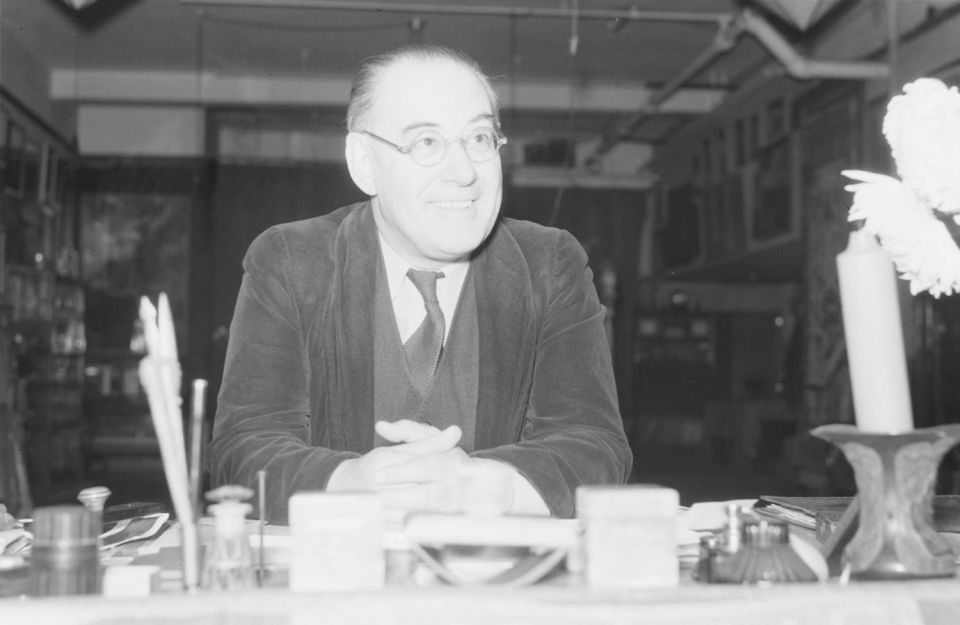
- Alfred La Liberté in 1941
- Born: 10 February 1882; Saint-Jean-sur-Richelieu, Quebec, Canada
- Died: 7 May 1952 (aged 70); Montreal, Quebec, Canada
- Era: 20th century

Alfred La Liberté (10 February 1882 – 7 May 1952) was a Canadian composer, pianist, writer on music, and music educator. He was a disciple and close personal friend of Alexander Scriabin. He was also an admirer of Marcel Dupré and Nikolai Medtner. Dupré notably dedicated his Variations, Opus 22 for piano to him and Medtner dedicated his Sonata minacciosa, Opus 53 no. 2 and his song The Captive, Opus 52 no. 7 to La Liberté. Most of his own compositions remain unfinished. He also contributed articles to Le Passe-Temps, including one on Scriabin in May 1946.

== Life and career ==
Born in Saint-Jean-sur-Richelieu, Quebec, La Liberté was named after the Canadian sculptor of the same name. He began his piano studies as a teenager with a Miss Malsberg. His later piano teachers included J.-B. Denys, Dominique Ducharme, Romain-Octave Pelletier I, and Émiliano Renaud. In 1902 he entered the Stern Conservatory in Berlin where he studied with such teachers as Ernst Baeker (harmony), Paul Lutzenko (piano), and Wilhelm Klatte (counterpoint and composition) through 1906. The expenses of his education in Berlin were paid largely through grants obtained from the German government after winning a series of piano competitions. He notably played in concert for Wilhelm II at both the imperial court of Berlin and the ducal court of Cobourg.

In 1906 La Liberté returned to Canada and began teaching at the Canadian Conservatory of Music in Ottawa in the autumn of 1906. He gave a highly lauded recital at the Monument national in Montreal on 22 November 1906. An admirer of the works of Alexander Scriabin, he began a correspondence with the composer in February 1907 while Scriabin was staying in New York City. Scriabin invited La Liberté to visit him in New York, and La Liberté came to that city for a visit in the summer of 1907. Scriabin convinced La Liberté to return to Berlin, and the composer soon began further studies in that city with Teresa Carreño. He then went to Brussels where he studied composition under Scriabin, becoming one of his close disciples. He gave recital tours in Germany and England from 1908 to 1910, notably appearing in concert with Emma Albani in London.

La Liberté returned to Montreal in 1911 where he opened a private teaching studio. He also was active in that city as a performer where he was a proponent of Scriabin's works. In 1913 he moved to New York City, where he taught as a guest lecturer at several institutions and ran a piano studio. Financial problems related to World War I put an end to his career in America and he once again returned to teaching privately in Montreal. From 1926 to 1935 he worked as a piano instructor for the Sisters of the Holy Names of Jesus and Mary. He then taught on the faculty of the Conservatoire national de musique for several years. Among his notable pupils were Hélène Baillargeon, Morris Davis, Gérald Desmarais, Hector Gratton, Djane Lavoie-Herz, Antonio Létourneau, Alfred Mignault, Marie-Thérèse Paquin, and Wilfrid Pelletier.

Liberté died in Montreal in 1952 at the age of 70. He was made an associate of the Canadian Music Centre posthumously. At the time of his death he was in possession of a number of Scriabin's original manuscripts, including Poem of Ecstasy and Sonata No. 5, and his wife donated them to the Scriabin museum in Moscow in 1972.
