= Seven Songs after Poems by Pushkin, Op. 52 (Medtner) =

Seven Songs after Poems by Pushkin
- Song cycle by Nikolai Medtner
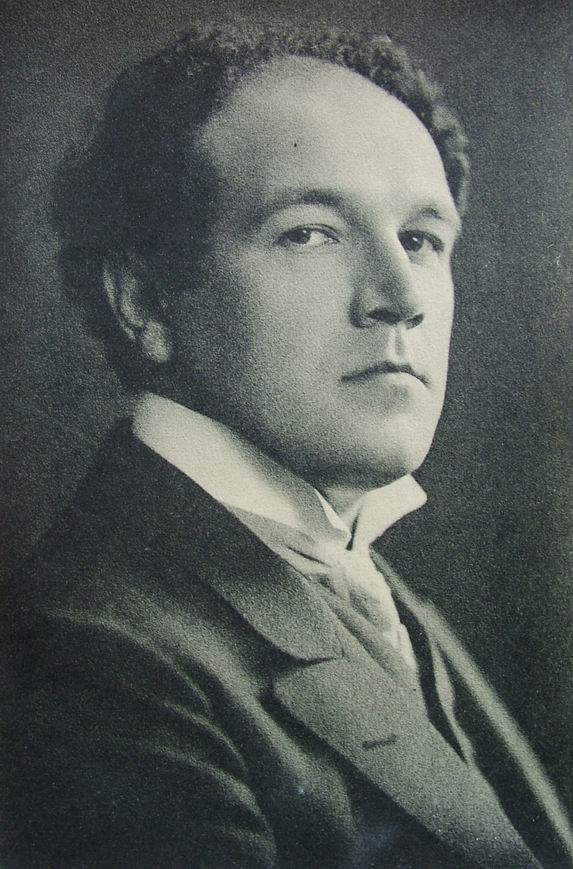
- The composer
- Native name: Семь песен на стихотворения А. Пушкина
- Opus: 52
- Year: 1929
- Text: Alexander Pushkin
- Language: Russian
- Published: 1931
- Publisher: Wilhelm Zimmermann
- Duration: 21 minutes approximately
- Movements: 7
- Scoring: Voice and piano

Seven Songs after Poems by Pushkin, (Note: The title has never been formally translated into English and has therefore appeared in various forms, including Seven Songs on Poems of Pushkin and Seven Songs after Pushkin, among others.) Op. 52 (Russian: Семь песен на стихотворения А. Пушкина, translit. Sem' pesen na stikhotvoreniya A. Pushkina), is a song cycle based on poems by Alexander Pushkin written by Russian composer Nikolai Medtner.

== Background ==
The cycle was completed in 1929 and published two years later, in 1931, by the composer's publisher Wilhelm Zimmermann. It was republished in Moscow by Muzgiz in 1961 in an urtext collected-works edition, and again by Zimmermann in 1993 in a two-volume edition. The poems were published in the original Russian, although a German translation by Oskar von Riesemann was also provided. A separate translation of the entire cycle was published independently of the score by Henry S. Drinker in 1946.

The song cycle sets seven poems by Alexander Pushkin, except for The Ravens (No. II), which comes from an untitled adaptation written by Pushkin in 1828 of a traditional poem entitled "The Twa Corbies", originally published by Walter Scott in The Minstrelsy of the Scottish Border, Vol. 3 (1803). Information on the origin of the individual poems is scarce. However, Elegy (No. III) was written in 1830 and was first published in the journal Biblioteka dlia chteniia (Библиотека для чтения, “Library for Reading”) on September 8, 1834. The poem on which Spanish Romance (No. V) is based is titled after its first line (“Pred ispankoi blagorodnoi”; “Before the noble Spanish lady”). Serenade (No. VI) was adapted from an untitled poem first published in 1830, and the final poem, The Prisoner (No. VII), was written in 1822 in Chișinău.

Each of the songs is dedicated to a different person important in Medtner’s life. The Window (No. I) and Visions (No. IV) are dedicated to the London-based soprano Tatiana Makushina, a significant champion of Medtner’s vocal music. The Ravens (No. II) is dedicated to Lawrance Collingwood, an English conductor who studied at the Saint Petersburg Conservatory and was instrumental in assisting Russian émigrés in the United Kingdom. Elegy (No. III) is dedicated to Emil Medtner, the composer’s elder brother, who was himself a writer and music critic. Spanish Romance (No. V) is dedicated to Alfred Swan, a Russian-born composer and one of Medtner’s biographers. Serenade (No. VI) is dedicated to Nina Koshetz, a prominent Ukrainian-American soprano. Finally, The Prisoner (No. VII) is dedicated to Alfred La Liberté, a Canadian pianist and one of Medtner’s most supportive colleagues in North America.

== Structure ==
Seven Songs consists of seven pieces scored for a medium-high voice with piano accompaniment. It has an approximate duration of 21 minutes. The list of songs is as follows:

Structure of Seven Songs after Poems by Pushkin, Op. 52
Piece No.	Russian title	Title in English (Note: Translation into English provided by Henry S. Drinker in 1946.)	Tempo marking
I	Окно Okno	The Window	Allegro passionato
II	Ворон (Шотландская песня) Voron (Shotlandskaya pesnya)	The Ravens	Allegretto
III	Элегия Elegiya	Elegy	Grave (sempre a tempo)
IV	Приметы Primety	Visions	Grazioso espressivo, ma sempre vivo
V	Испанский романс Ispanskiy romans	Spanish Romance	Sempre sostenuto (al rigore di tempo)
VI	Серенада Serenada	Serenade	Allegro
VII	Узник Uznik	The Prisoner	Allegro eroico

== Recordings ==
During his lifetime, Nikolai Medtner never recorded the complete cycle, but he did record excerpts from it. He recorded three songs from the set: Nos. I, II, and V. Nos. I and II were recorded at Abbey Road Studio No. 3 on September 19, 1947, with soprano Oda Slobodskaya and Medtner at the piano. The recordings were made for HMV, though only No. II was eventually released. It was later reissued by Melodiya, EMI Classics, ArkivMusic, St-Laurent, Dante, and Warner Classics. No. I has remained unpublished. Medtner also recorded No. V with soprano Tatiana Makushina, accompanying at the piano. This recording was issued by HMV in 1947 and was later reissued by St-Laurent.

The following is a list of complete recordings of the work:

Recordings of Seven Songs after Poems by Pushkin, Op. 52
Soprano	Piano	Date of recording	Place of recording	Label
Lydia Chernykh	Lubov Orfenova	1990	—	Melodiya
Ekaterina Levental	Frank Peters	March 2019	Westvest90, Schiedam, The Netherlands	Brilliant Classics
