= Béatrice La Palme =

Canadian opera singer

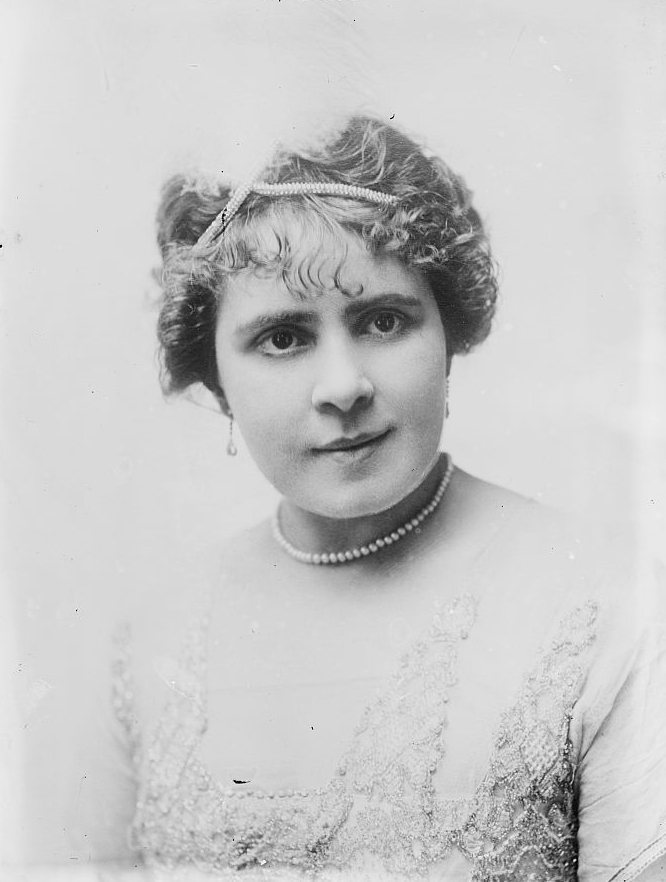
- Born: July 27, 1878; Belœil, Quebec, Canada
- Died: January 8, 1921 (aged 42); Montreal, Quebec, Canada

Béatrice La Palme (July 27, 1878 – January 8, 1921), was a Canadian soprano opera singer, violinist, and music teacher.

== Biography ==
Born on July 27, 1878, in Belœil, Quebec, La Palme studied violin with Frantz Jehin-Prume. After moving to London in 1895, she won the Donald Smith, 1st Baron Strathcona and Mount Royal scholarship to the Royal College of Music, where she studied with Enrique Fernandez Arbos.

She made her debut at Covent Garden in 1903 and at the Opéra-Comique in Paris on 10 September 1905 in Mireille. There she created the role of Madelon in Fortunio, and also sang Colette in La basoche, Micaëla in Carmen, Betly in Le Chalet, Marie in La fille du régiment, Souzouki in Madame Butterfly, Javotte in Manon, Ellen/Rose in Lakmé and Mignon.

She died in Montreal on January 8, 1921, and was entombed at the Notre Dame des Neiges Cemetery in Montreal.
