= Victoria Cartier =

Canadian music educator

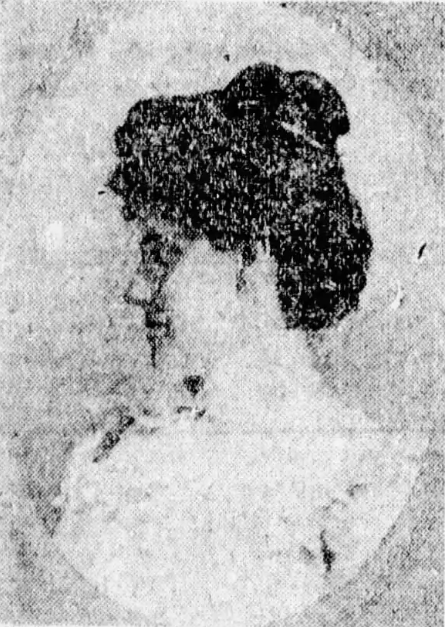
Victoria Cartier (c. 1911)

Victoria Cartier (b. Sorel, Quebec, 4 Apr 1867, d. Montreal 1 Jan 1955) was a Canadian pianist, organist and music educator, who was named an officer of the French Académie and Instruction publique . She was a niece of Sir George-Étienne Cartier.

Daughter of Louis-Eusebe Désiré Cartier, notary, and Amélie Désirée Chapdelaine, Cartier studied with the Sisters of the Congregation of Notre-Dame in Sorel and took piano and organ with Romain-Octave Pelletier. She gave her first recital in Sorel and was also a piano teacher there, as well as an organist at St-Pierre Church. Her uncle, founder of the Journal de Sorel, offered to be her patron when she left the convent.

In 1896, she went to Paris, where she studied organ with Eugène Gigout, piano with Élie Delaborde, theory with Louis-Albert Bourgault-Ducoudray and pedagogy with Hortense Parent. She also studied Gregorian chant at the abbeys of France. While studying there, she met Théodore Dubois, Raoul Pugno, and Camille Saint-Saëns.

She returned to Montreal in 1898, founded École de piano Paris-Montréal, putting the teaching methods of her French masters into motion for the next 25 years. On 27 Oct 1898 at Karn Hall, she performed the Canadian premiere of the Rhapsodie sur des airs Canadiens for organ (Durand ca 1898), which Gigout had dedicated to her.

Cartier gained broader knowledge of European methods during other trips. Her work in music education was considered stimulating and she participated in many concerts at her school, in public and on radio.

She also taught in several institutions, such as Villa-Maria Convent and the Institut pédagogique de Westmount. Her students included Alfred Lamoureux, Jean Leduc, Éviola Plouffe, and Esther Wayland. Cartier also served as organist at several Montreal churches, including first at St-Louis-de-France, then at St-Viateur d'Outremont where she inaugurated the Casavant organ in 1913, and, finally, Immaculée-Conception. She performed with Frantz Jehin-Prume at his last public concert in 1896.

She was named an officer of the French Académie in 1901 and of the Instruction publique in 1912, in Paris. In 1903, Pope Pius X sent her a letter, granting her blessing for her services to the cause of religious music in Canada, France and Belgium. In 1912, Cartier debuted the Pratte grand piano at the Ritz-Carleton in.
