= Rachel Laurin =

Canadian organist and composer (1961–2023)

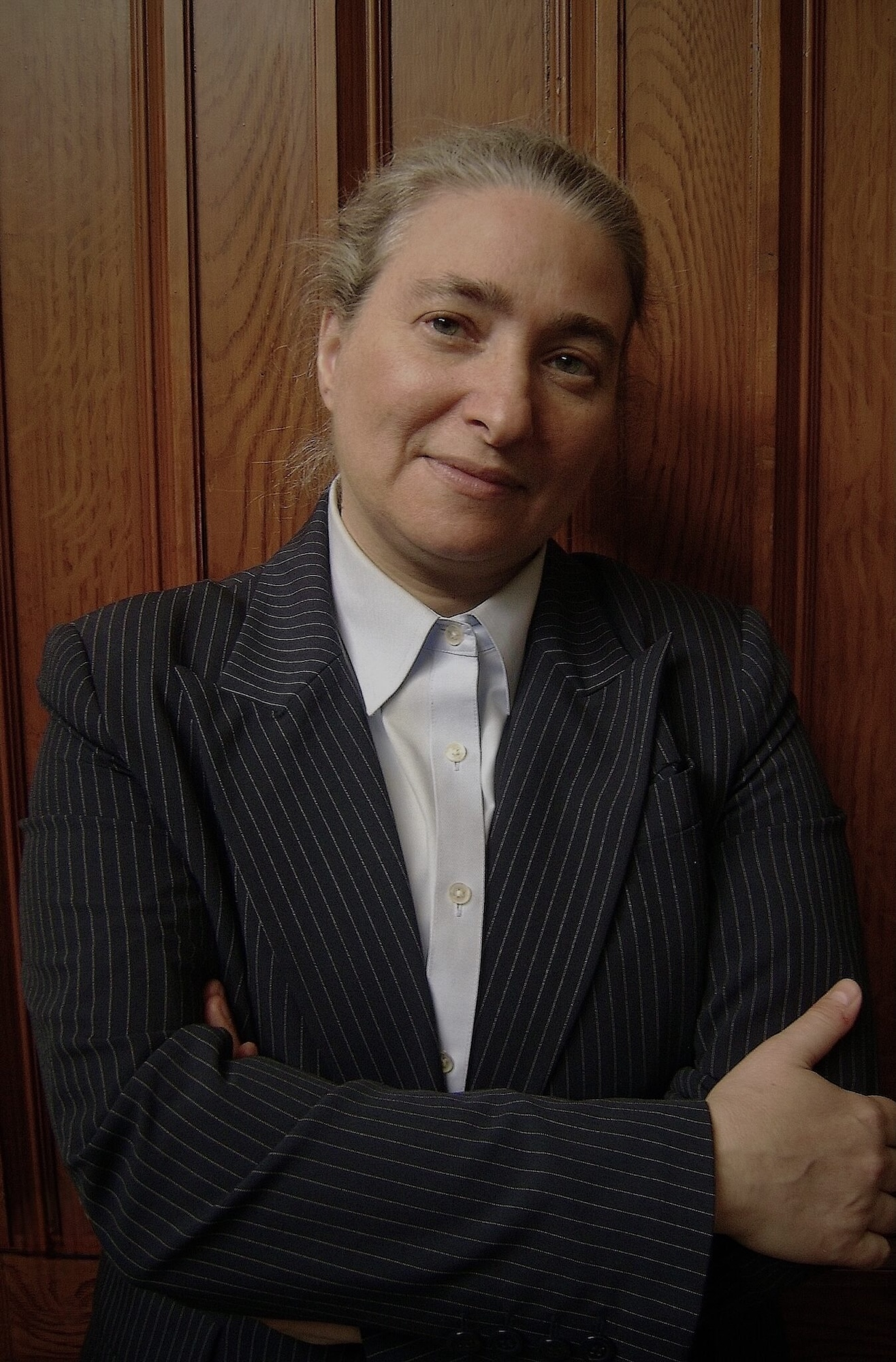

Rachel Laurin (rah-SHELL law-RAN), born on 11 August 1961, in Saint-Benoît (Québec), and deceased on 13 August 2023, in Ottawa (Ontario), was a Canadian organist, composer and educator.

== Musical training ==
It was in her hometown, with her mother Madeleine Brunet, who played both the piano and the organ, that Rachel Laurin began studying piano at age 9, and then organ at 14. Her interest in composition emerged at 15, and at 17, she moved to Montréal to pursue her studies.

From 1978 to 1980, she attended Collège Marguerite-Bourgeoys (now Marianopolis College) where she studied organ with Lucienne L’Heureux-Arel. Admitted to the Montreal Conservatory of Music in 1980, she studied organ with Gaston Arel and Raymond Daveluy, piano with Raoul Sosa, and jazz with Nick Ayoub.

During her studies, she won the McAbbie Foundation Scholarship (1985), the Wilfrid-Pelletier Scholarship of Excellence (1986), and the Conrad-Letendre Scholarship (five times). She received the first prize in organ in 1986, and alongside her curriculum at the Conservatoire, she took private composition lessons with Raymond Daveluy.

== Career ==
Rachel Laurin led a dual career as an organist and a composer.

=== Organist and improviser ===
Upon completion of her studies, Rachel Laurin became the organist of the Crypt and assistant to the titular organist of the Beckerath organ at Saint Joseph’s Oratory of Mount Royal (Montréal), a position she held from 1986 to 2002. She was titular organist at Notre-Dame Cathedral Basilica in Ottawa (Ontario) from 2002 to 2006, subsequently leaving this position to devote herself fully to concerts, composition, leading workshops and masterclasses, and presenting lectures.

She gave numerous concerts and recitals in Canada and the United States, notably as part of the Concerts Spirituels series presented that Saint Joseph’s Oratory, as well as regional and national activities of the Royal Canadian College of Organists (RCCO) and the American Guild of Organists (AGO). She also performed in several European countries, including France, Germany, Italy, Belgium, the United Kingdom, and Switzerland.

Between 1986 and 2013, she participated, as an organist, in ten recording projects.

In July 1999, as part of the national Organ Festival Canada, presented in Hamilton (Ontario) by the RCCO, she was a soloist, with the Hamilton Philharmonic Orchestra conducted by Boris Brott, in Raymond Daveluy’s Concerto for Organ and Orchestra.

In July 2000, she presented Louis Vierne’s Six Symphonies, in three recitals, at Saint Joseph’s Oratory, performances that received critical and public acclaim. One of the few organists to perform this complete cycle in concert, she reprised it in 2001 at Notre-Dame Cathedral Basilica in Ottawa.

In September 2002, at the inauguration of the Létourneau organ at the Winspear Centre, she premièred Jacques Hétu’s Concerto for Organ and Orchestra with the Edmonton Symphony Orchestra under the baton of Mario Bernardi. She reprised this major work at the National Arts Centre (Ottawa) in 2008 with the Ottawa Symphony Orchestra, and in Toronto in 2009 with the Kitchener-Waterloo Symphony Orchestra.

In addition to her performing activities, she was regularly invited to serve on the juries of organ competitions, including the RCCO National Organ Competition in 2012, and the Canadian International Organ Competition in 2021.

=== Composer ===
Rachel Laurin became an “associate composer” of the Canadian Music Centre in 1989, and “house composer” at Leupold Editions from 2006 until her death in 2023. Composing almost exclusively on commission, her catalogue includes 112 opus numbers, many of which are collections of pieces or works in several movements. She wrote for solo instruments, chamber music ensembles, orchestra, voice, choir; more than half of her output is for organ.

Her compositional style is rooted in traditional forms and structures (fugal writing is frequent), in an accessible tonal-modal language, coloured by chromatism.

Reviewing a 2013 album of Laurin’s newer works, Organists’ Review magazine wrote: “Her music is approachable and enjoyable but by no means bland. It has some of the piquancy of Ravel, the harmonic inventiveness of Holst and the rhythmic vitality of Walton. She is obviously at ease with formal musical structures, sonata form, fugue, and so on. Most of all, one senses that she enjoys composing and her enjoyment is conveyed to the listener in all of these pieces.” In a review of a 2016 recording, Choir & Organ magazine commended her “imaginative and demanding scores”, “well crafted in a kind of New World fusion of musical styles from France, Germany and England.”

Although several works require virtuosity from the performer, she also composed pieces intended for younger or less-experienced instrumentalists, such as the seven volumes of Pièces Courtes (Short Pieces) for organ, Esquisses d’été (Summer Sketches) for piano, or Three Canadian Scenes for flute and piano.

Her compositions are published by publishing houses in North America and Australia — Leupold Editions, Canadian Music Centre, Doberman-Yppan, Nouveau Théâtre Musical, RCCO Music Publications, Morningstar Music Publishers, Allegro Music Publishing — and are regularly performed, especially those for organ, in renowned concert halls and illustrious places of worship around the globe.

Her compositions also appear on a number of albums.

Her manuscripts were deposited at the Leupold Foundation (organ compositions) and the Canadian Music Centre (compositions without organ), a complete and detailed list of her compositions is available on the official website, and the official YouTube channel dedicated to her works contains over 140 videos, including performances by Rachel Laurin herself.

=== Educator and lecturer ===
As an organist-composer, lecturer, and educator, Rachel Laurin was frequently invited to speak and teach at several Canadian and American universities, including:

- Yale University (Connecticut)
- Houston University (Texas)
- Saint Thomas University (Minneapolis)
- Baylor University (Texas)
- Indiana University of Pennsylvania (Pennsylvania)
- Mount Royal University (Alberta)
- University of Saint Lawrence (New York)
- University of Missouri-Kansas City (Missouri)
- University of Alberta (Alberta)

In addition, she taught organ improvisation at the Montréal Conservatory of Music (1988-1992), the École de musique sacrée d’Épinal (France), the Summer Institute of Church Music (Whitby, Ontario), the Summer Academy of Mount Royal University Conservatory (Calgary, Alberta), as well as in workshops organized by the RCCO and the AGO.

== Distinctions ==
- 1985 — McAbbie Foundation Scholarship
- 1986 — Wilfrid-Pelletier Scholarship of Excellence
- Conrad-Letendre Scholarship (five times)
- 2008 — Holtkamp-AGO Composition Prize
- 2009 — First Prize in the Marilyn Mason New Organ Music Competition
- Since 2016 — Member of the Honorary Committee of the Fédération Francophone des Amis de l’Orgue (FFAO)
- 2019 — First Prize (Category A) at the Orgelkids Composition Contest
- 2020 — Distinguished Composer Award from the American Guild of Organists (AGO)
- 2022 — Winner of the Pogorzelski-Yankee Competition for New Organ Music
- Since 2023 — Honorary Member ( Fellow ) of the Royal Canadian College of Organists (FRCCO)
- 2023-2024 Season — Composer in residence (posthumously) at Salle Bourgie (Montréal), season during which her works, including two premières, were featured in four concerts
- 2025 — The RCCO organizes the first edition of the Rachel Laurin Composition Competition

== Discography ==
List of albums on which Rachel Laurin appears as a performer or composer.

=== Organist ===
- 1986 — Noëls • 33 rpm • Société Nouvelle d’Enregistrement, SNE 531
- 1989 — Noël nouvelet • CD • Amplitude, OPCD-1007
- 1990 — Adeste fideles • CD • Analekta, AN 2 9301
- 1990 — Adoration • CD • Analekta, AN 2 8704
- 1995 — Rachel Laurin: Works for Organ • CD • Association Jeanne d’Arc, DJA 95 (see digital reissue below)
- 1996 — Five Sonatas by Raymond Daveluy • CD • CBC Records (Musica Viva series), MVCD 1111-2
- 1998 — Bach Éternel • CD • Musicus , MCD 331192 (see digital reissue below)
- 1998 — Alleluia (compilation) • CD • Analekta, AN 2 8810
- 1999 — Rachel Laurin plays Liszt & Brahms • CD • Motette, CD 12621
- 2002 — Hommage à Conrad Letendre • CD • self-published, RL 292392 (see digital reissue below)
- 2004 — The Power of the Organ • CD • Fidelio/Musicus, FACD013
- 2013 — Music by Rachel Laurin • CD • Raven Records, OAR-943
- 2025 — Rachel Laurin Plays Her Early Works • reissue, as a digital album, of DJA 95 • Pro Organo, CD 7295
- 2025 — The Conrad Letendre School • reissue, as a digital album, of RL 292392 • Pro Organo , CD 7296
- 2025 — Bach Organ Transcriptions • reissue, as a digital album, of MCD 331192 • Pro Organo , CD 7298

=== Composer ===
- 1995 — Opus Québec • CD • Analekta , AN 2 8710
- 2006 — Festivals • CD • Atma Classique, ACD2 2295
- 2011 — Rachel Laurin: Works for Organ • CD • Acis, APL 61256
- 2012 — Sounds of the North • digital album • Gala Records, GAL 108
- 2013 — Music by Rachel Laurin • CD • Raven Records, OAR 943
- 2015 — Three Halls • CD • Pro Organo, CD 7268
- 2016 — Pilgrimages: Organ Music of Rachel Laurin • CD • Raven Records, OAR-975
- 2016 — Dynamic Duo • CD • Pro Organo, CD 7275
- 2017 — Sonatas and Variations • CD • Centaur Records, CRC 3559
- 2017 — Celebrating Canadian Women • digital album • LBS CD2017
- 2018 — The Chicago Recital • CD • Acis, APL 41752
- 2018 — Inspirations • CD • Pro Organo, CD 7288
- 2018 — Brahms Organ Variations • CD • Musikproduktion Dabringhaus und Grimm, MDG 949 2051-6
- 2019 — Christ Cathedral Dedication • CD • Gothic, G-49326
- 2020 — Canadian Organ Music • CD • Delphian Records, DCD 34234-CD
- 2021 — Organ Music for Two, Vol. 5 • CD • Gothic, G-49336
- 2022 — Symphony Hall Sorcery • CD • Regent Records, REG CD566
- 2023 — Montréal Musica • digital album • Centrediscs, CMCCD 32023
- 2023 — A Celebration • CD • Regent Records, REG CD584
- 2023 — De la lumière aux étoiles • CD • Atma Classique, ACD2 2872
- 2024 — Music for Flute, Viola & Piano • digital album • Centaur Records, CRC 4075
- 2024 — Mass of the Eternal Flame • CD • Acis, APL 53868
- 2025 — Heroic Spirit • digital album • Selby Abbey Organ Masters
- 2025 — A Blaze of Song • CD • Raven Records OAR-202
- 2025 — Sparkling Intensity • CD • Raven Records OAR-204

== Compositions in chronological order (by instrumentation) ==
=== Organ solo ===
- Suite brève, op. 6, No. 1 (1984)
- Suite brève, op. 6, No. 2 (1984)
- Sonate en fa, op. 7 (1985)
- Pastorale, d’après "Sanctus, Sanctus, Sanctus" de Lucien Daveluy, op. 13 (1988)
- Scènes Vosgiennes, op. 16 (1989)
- Improvisations pour tous les temps, op. 24 (1992)
- Variations sur un Noël lorrain, op. 26 (1994)
- Quatre pèlerinages en Lorraine, op. 30 (1996)
- Trois Pièces, op. 31 (1997–2000)
- Symphonie No. 1, op. 36 (2003)
- Acclamations, op. 37 (2003)
- Étude Héroïque, op. 38 (2004)
- Petite Suite sur un motet de Gerald Bales, op. 41 (2005)
- Douze Courtes Pièces, op. 43 (2006)
- Introduction et Passacaille sur un thème de Raymond Daveluy, op. 44 (2006)
- Prélude et Fugue en Fa mineur, op. 45 (2007)
- Partita sur "Nun danket", op. 47 (2007)
- Épilogue, op. 50 (2008)
- A Royal Canadian Fanfare, op. 53 (2009)
- Trois Bagatelles, op. 54 (2009)
- Symphonie No. 2, op. 55 (2009–2010)
- Greensboro Suite, op. 56 (2010)
- Sept Courtes Pièces, op. 58 (2010)
- Berceuse à Pierre, op. 61 (2011)
- Fantasy and Fugue on Genevan Psalm 47 (organ four hands and feet), op. 62 (2012)
- Suite in D Major for Don Menzies, op. 63 (2012)
- Douze Courtes Pièces, op. 64 (2012–2013)
- Étude-Caprice "Le rire de Belzébuth", op. 66 (2013)
- Douze Courtes Pièces, op. 68 (2013–2014)
- Poème symphonique pour le Temps de l’Avent, op. 69 (2013)
- Étude symphonique pour pédale solo: Variations sur "That Good Old Baylor Line", op. 72 (2014)
- Fantasy and Fugue in D major, op. 73 (2014)
- Aria and Fugue in A for Aaron, op. 74 (2015)
- Douze Courtes Pièces, op. 75 (2018)
- Humoresque: Hommage à Marcel Dupré, op. 77 (2016)
- Finale, op. 78 (2017)
- Hommage à Buxtehude, op. 86 (2018)
- Little Prelude and Fugue in G major, op. 87 (2018)
- Fantaisie à deux (organ four hands and feet), op. 88 (2018)
- Omaggio Festivo, op. 89 (2018)
- Sonate No. 1, op. 91 (2019)
- Ten Little Sketches for Ten Little Fingers, op. 92 (2019)
- Petit Triptyque, op. 93 (2019)
- Ouverture "Mr. Mistoffelees", op. 94 (2019)
- Fantasia quasi scherzo, op. 95 (2019)
- Variations Sweelinck, op. 96 (2019)
- Poème symphonique en l’honneur de Saint Benoît, op. 97 (2020)
- Bagatelle burlesque: Hommage à Beethoven, op. 98 (2020)
- Cantabile à deux (organ four hands and feet), op. 99 (2020)
- Thirteen Easy Pieces, op. 100 (2020)
- Cinq Courtes Pièces, op. 100b (2020)
- Fantasy and Fugue on a Swedish Folk Song, op. 102 (2020)
- Toccata for a Great Space, op. 103 (2020)
- A Festive Portrait (Fanfare), op. 105 (2021)
- Diptyque, op. 107 (2021)
- The Legend of the Sleepy Hollow (organ and narrator), op. 108 (2021)
- Sonate No. 2 "Saint Luke", op. 109 (2022)
- Impromptu on "Adoro Te Devote", op. 109b (2022)
- Ubi Caritas et Amor, op. 110 (2022)
- Variations and Theme, op. 111 (2022)
- Douze Courtes Pièces, op. 112 (2023)

=== Organ with other instruments ===
- Acclamations (two trumpets, trombone and organ), op. 37 (2003)
- Fantaisie (harp and organ), op. 52 (2009)
- Sonate (horn and organ), op. 60 (2011)
- Introduction et Allegro (oboe and organ), op. 65 (2012)
- Capriccio quasi burlesco (alto saxophone and organ), op. 83 (2018)
- Sonate (flute and organ), op. 84 (2018)
- Te Deum (brass quintet, timpani and organ), op. 90 (2019)

=== Piano solo ===
- Quatre Pièces, op. 1 (1981/rev. 1987)
- Sonate, op. 2 (1982)
- Quatre Pièces, op. 3 (1983/rev. 1987)
- Hommage à Fauré, op. 5 (1984)
- Intermezzo, op. 8 (1986)
- Trois chants sans paroles, op. 49 (2009)
- Parfums, op. 81 (2017)
- Esquisses d'été, op. 82 (2017)

=== Chamber music ===
- Trio (flute, viola and piano), op. 17 (1990)
- Poème chorégraphique (flute, oboe, clarinet, bassoon, horn, timpani, triangle, xylophone, and string quartet), op. 18 (1990)
- Quatuor (string quartet), op. 19 (1990)
- Sonate (violin and piano), op. 23 (1993)
- Divertissement (vibraphone, marimba and piano), op. 25 (1993)
- Festivals (violin and piano), op. 27 (1994)
- Sonate (flute and piano), op. 29 (1995)
- Deux Noëls (string quartet or string orchestra), op. 32 (1998)
- Fantaisie sur un thème japonais (string quartet), op. 34 (1999)
- Poème d’après le texte du Psaume 122 (string quartet and narrator ad lib.), op. 35 (2001)
- Sonate (violin and viola), op. 40 (2005)
- Sonate (viola and piano), op. 42 (2006)
- Suite (harp and string quartet), op. 101 (2020)
- Three Canadian Scenes (flute and piano), op. 104 (2021)

=== Vocal works ===
- Trois fables de La Fontaine (voice and piano), op. 9 (1987)
- Cantate sur l’hymne Veni Creator (voice and organ), op. 10 (1987)
- Le bestiaire, sur des poèmes d’Apollinaire (voice and piano), op. 22 (1992)
- Quatre cantiques (voice and organ), op. 31b (1997)
- Trois mélodies sur des poèmes d’Anne Hébert (voice and piano), op. 33 (1999)
- Psaume 112 (voice and organ), op. 39 (2004)
- Chant pour un Québec lointain – 1e cycle (voice and piano), op. 57 (2010)
- Chant pour un Québec lointain – 2e cycle (voice and piano), op. 70 (2014)
- Chant pour un Québec lointain – 3e cycle (voice and piano), op. 71 (2014)

=== Choral works ===
- Trois arrangements de folklore (SATB choir or male choir and piano), op. 1b (1982)
- Messe pour les fêtes solennelles (SATB choir, chamber ensemble and organ), op. 4 (1983)
- Cantique "Je te révère" (male choir or vocal quartet and organ), op. 4b (1983)
- Dix cantiques traditionnels (SATB choir and organ), op. 6b (1984)
- Deux arrangements de Noël (SATB choir and organ), op. 7b (1985)
- Trois motets en l’honneur de la Sainte Famille (SATB choir a cappella), op. 14 (1989)
- Messe de louange (SATB choir, soloists and organ), op. 15 (1988)
- Deux folklores (male vocal quartet and piano), op. 22b (1992)
- Motet "Adoro Te" (SATB choir with organ or piano ad lib.), op. 51 (2009)
- Motet "Filiae Regum," en l’honneur de Sainte Anne (SATB choir and organ), op. 67 (2013)
- Anthem "Saint Joseph, Canada Belongs To Thee" (SATB choir and organ), op. 75Bb (2017)
- Cantate brève "Tranquilles épiphanies" (SATB choir and piano), op. 76 (2015)
- Hymne de reconnaissance à Jean Coutu (SATB choir and piano), op. 80 (2017)
- "Dedisti Domine:" Motet en l’honneur de Saint Clément (SATB choir and organ), op. 85 (2018)
- Magnificat & Nunc Dimittis (SATB choir and organ), op. 106 (2021)

=== Concertos ===
- Concerto (vibraphone, marimba and strings), op. 21 (1992)
- Concerto (piano and orchestra), op. 46 (2008)
- Concerto in D (organ, string orchestra and timpani), op. 59 (2010)

=== Miscellaneous Works ===
- Fantaisie (guitar), op. 28 (1995)
- Quatre Préludes (harpsichord), op. 48 (2007)

=== Transcriptions for Organ ===
- Johann Sebastian Bach: Concerto en ré mineur, BWV 1052 (movements 2 & 3. Rachel Laurin op. 30b, 1996)
- Johann Sebastian Bach: Fantaisie chromatique et fugue, BWV 903 (Rachel Laurin op. 30c, 1996)
- Johannes Brahms: Variations et Fugue sur un thème de Handel (Rachel Laurin op. 11, 1988/rev. 1997)
- Franz Liszt: Sonate en si mineur (Rachel Laurin op. 20, 1991)
