= Guillaume Couture (musician) =

Canadian choir conductor, composer, music critic and music educator

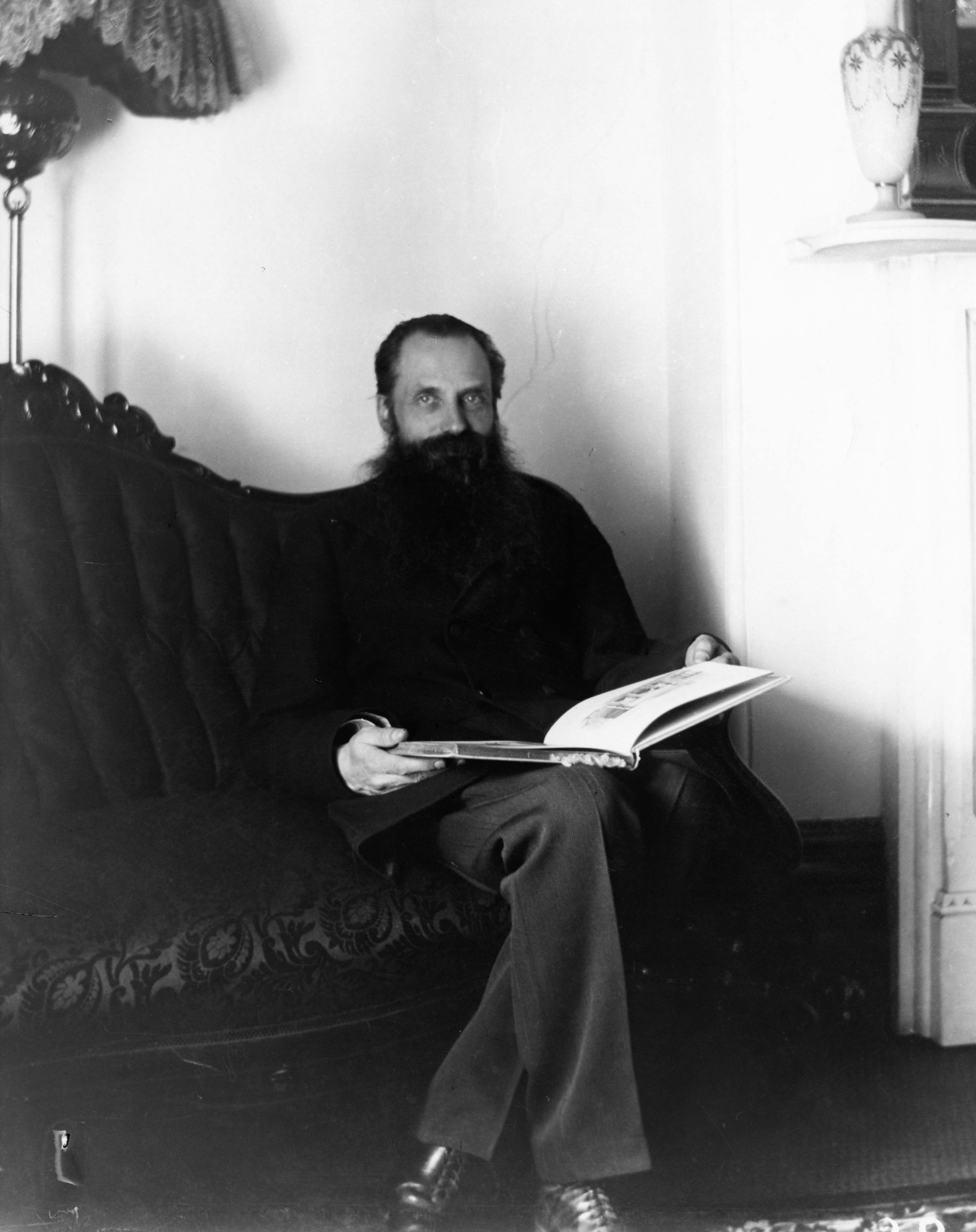
- Couture pictured before 1915
- Born: 23 October 1851; Montreal, Canada
- Died: 15 January 1915 (aged 63); Montreal, Canada
- Burial place: Notre Dame des Neiges Cemetery
- Education: Conservatoire de Paris
- Occupations: Conductor, composer, educator
- Relatives: Jean Papineau-Couture (grandson)

Guillaume Couture (23 October 1851 – 15 January 1915) was a Canadian choir conductor, composer, music critic, and music educator. Although he never pursued a performance career, he is particularly remembered for his work as a voice teacher, having taught many notable Canadian singers. He is the grandfather of composer Jean Papineau-Couture.

== Life and career ==
Born in Montreal, Couture was choirmaster at Saint-Jacques Cathedral before studying at the Conservatoire de Paris with Romain Bussine and Théodore Dubois from 1873 to 1875. His Rêverie, opus 2 (notably the only Canadian orchestral work published before 1900) was premiered in Paris in 1875 in a concert that also included original works by Henri Duparc, Gabriel Fauré, and César Franck. That same year he returned to his native city where he began teaching privately and writing as a music critic for La Minerve. He continued to return periodically to France for further studies with Bussine through 1887.

In early 1876 Couture returned to Paris to assume the post of choirmaster at the Basilica of St. Clotilde, Paris. César Franck was notably the organist at the cathedral at that time. He left there in late 1877 for Montreal where he took up teaching again, both privately and for religious institutions like the Congregation of Notre Dame and the Institute of the Sisters of the Holy Names of Jesus and Mary. He taught at the High School for Girls, Montreal, from 1885 to 1914.

Among his notable students were Joseph-Arsène Brassard, Jean-Noël Charbonneau, Guillaume Dupuis, Achille Fortier, Henri Gagnon, Charles Labelle, Arthur Laurendeau, Édouard LeBel, Frédéric Pelletier, Arthur Plamondon, Céline Marier, Léo-Pol Morin, Rodolphe Plamondon, Caroline Racicot, Roy Royal, and Louis Verschelden.

Couture continued to work as a music critic, writing for such papers as Revue de Montréal, La Patrie, and Montreal Star. In 1880 he became conductor of the Montreal Philharmonic Society which he led until it disbanded in 1899. In 1894 he founded the Montréal Symphony Orchestra (no relation to the current orchestra), which he directed through 1896. He composed his most significant work, the oratorio Jean le Précurseur, from 1907 to 1909. He died in Montreal in 1915 at the age of 63, and was entombed at the Notre Dame des Neiges Cemetery in Montreal.
