= Jean Papineau-Couture =

Canadian composer and academic

- Born: November 12, 1916; Montreal, Quebec, Canada
- Died: August 11, 2000 (aged 83); Montreal, Quebec, Canada
- Education: Collège Jean-de-Brébeuf; New England Conservatory of Music; Longy School of Music
- Occupations: Academic and composer
- Awards: National Order of Quebec; Order of Canada

Jean Papineau-Couture, CC GOQ (French pronunciation: [ʒɑ̃ papino kutyʁ]; November 12, 1916 – August 11, 2000) was a Canadian composer and academic.

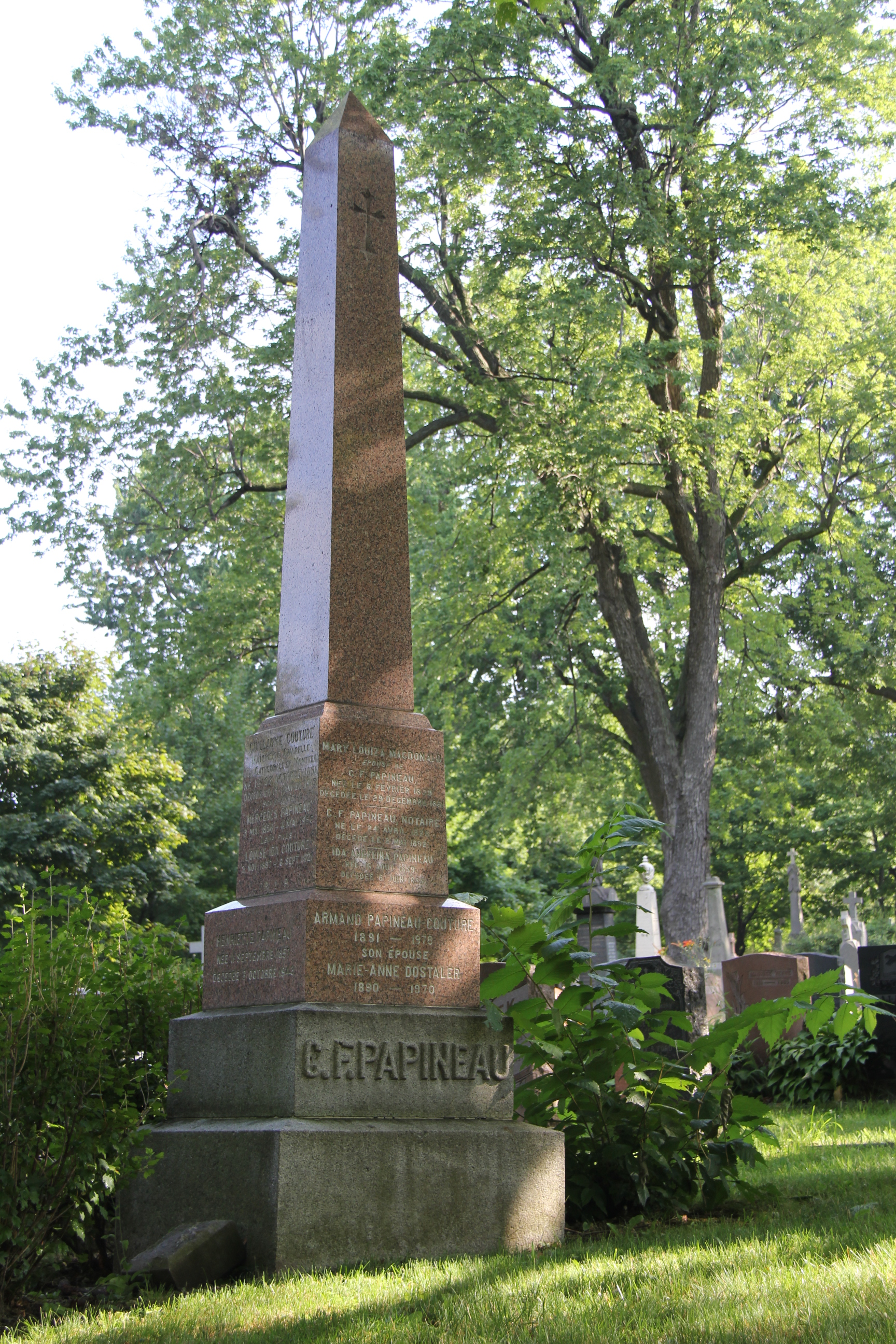
Guillaume Couture & Jean Papineau-Couture pierre tombale (tomb), Notre Dame des Neiges Cemetery, Montreal.

Born in Montreal, Papineau-Couture was the grandson of conductor and composer Guillaume Couture. As a child he studied piano with his mother. He first studied privately in Montreal with Gabriel Cusson before entering the Collège Jean-de-Brébeuf where he received a Bachelor of Arts in 1937. He then attended the New England Conservatory of Music in Boston where he received a Bachelor of Music in 1941. He studied with Nadia Boulanger at the Longy School of Music in Cambridge, Massachusetts.

Returning to Quebec, Papineau-Couture's teaching career started in 1946 when he joined the faculty of the Conservatoire de musique du Québec à Montréal where he stayed until 1962. He also taught in the Faculty of Music at the Université de Montréal. He was named vice-dean in 1967 and dean from 1968 until 1973. His students included François Morel, Pierre Rolland, and Jeannine Vanier.

A champion of contemporary Canadian classical music, he was the founding president of the Société de musique contemporaine du Québec in 1966.

He was the recipient of many honours including the Calixa-Lavallée Award (1962), Prix Denise-Pelletier (1981), Officer of the Order of Canada (promoted to Companion in 1993), Grand Officer of the National Order of Quebec (1989), and the Governor General's Performing Arts Award (1994).

He died in Montreal on August 11, 2000.

The Papineau-Couture portrait in the Canadian Composers Portraits series was released in 2002.
