= Romain-Octave Pelletier I =

Canadian musician

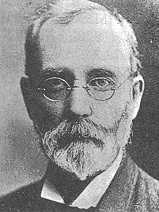
Romain-Octave Pelletier

Romain-Octave Pelletier I (sometimes spelled Peltier) (9 September 1843 – 4 March 1927) was a Canadian organist, pianist, composer, writer on music, and music educator.

== Early life and career ==
Born in Montreal, Pelletier was a member of a prominent musical family. Three of his sons had successful musical careers: Frédéric Pelletier, Romain Pelletier, and Victor Pelletier. His grandson, Romain-Octave Pelletier II, was a well known violinist. His elder brother, Orphir Pelletier, was a composer and organist at St. Patrick's Basilica, Montreal. Largely self-taught, it is from Orphir that he received his only early music lessons. He later studied for two years in Europe during the early 1870s after having worked for almost 15 years as a church organist.

In 1857, at the age of 15, Pelletier succeeded Jean-Chrysostome Brauneis II as organist at Saint-Jacques Cathedral. He remained there for the next ten years, during which time he studied law and obtained certification as a notary. He notably officiated the marriage license of violinist Frantz Jehin-Prume, whom he accompanied numerous times in recital, and mezzo-soprano Rosita del Vecchio in 1866.

In 1866–1867 Pelletier spent some months in Hartford, Connecticut where he made the acquaintance of organist Samuel Prowse Warren. From 1867 to 1875 he served as organist at the Church of St James-the-Less on St-Denis St where he caused some controversy for daring to play works by Protestant composers like Johann Sebastian Bach and Felix Mendelssohn. In 1869 he married, after which he began actively teaching piano and organ lessons privately.

== Studies in Europe and later career ==
Pelletier spent almost two years touring Europe in 1871–1872. During that time he studied under George Cooper, William Thomas Best, and John Baptiste Calkin in London, Jacques-Nicolas Lemmens in Brussels, and with pianist Antoine François Marmontel and organist Louis Lebel in Paris. He notably performed works by Bach in the presence of Charles-Marie Widor at the Église Saint-Sulpice in 1872. He later sojourned to Europe again in 1900 in the company of organ builders Joseph-Claver Casavant and Samuel-Marie Casavant.

After returning to Montreal in 1872, Pelletier resumed teaching and playing the organ at St James the Lesser. He taught solfège at the École normale Jacques-Cartier from 1876 to 1907. He served as interim president of the Académie de musique du Québec on several occasions (1884-5, 1894–5, 1902–4, 1909–10, and 1915–16) in addition to teaching at a number of religious schools in Montreal. He was once again appointed organist of St James Cathedral in 1887 (at the St-Joseph Chapel until the inauguration of the new cathedral on Dominion Square in 1894) and remained in that post until 1923.

In 1904 Pelletier became one of the original music faculty members at McGill University, where he taught piano up till the latter years of his life. In 1919 he was awarded an honorary doctorate from the Université de Montréal. Among his many notable students during his long career are: Alcibiade Béique, Albertine Caron-Legris, Victoria Cartier, Claude Champagne, Édouard Clarke, Alexandre-M. Clerk, Jean Dansereau, Jean Deslauriers, Joseph-Daniel Dussault, J.-J. Gagnier, Henri Gagnon, Alfred La Liberté, Alfred Lamoureux, Alphonse Lavallée-Smith, Émery Lavigne, Ernest Lavigne, Antonio Létourneau, Clarence Lucas, Alfred Mignault, Albertine Morin-Labrecque, Joseph Piché, William Reed, Léon Ringuet, Amédée Tremblay, and Alice Vinette. See: List of music students by teacher: N to Q#Romain-Octave Pelletier I.
