= Achille Fortier =

Canadian composer and music educator

Achille Fortier (23 October 1864 – 19 August 1939) was a Canadian composer and music educator. His compositional output includes a modest amount of choral and chamber works, several songs and motets, and a small amount of symphonic music. A considerable portion of his compositions are religious in nature. Much of his work remains unpublished and some of his music is now lost as it was destroyed by a fire. The Bibliothèque et Archives nationales du Québec holds more than 30 of his original scores in its collection.

== Life ==
Born in Saint-Clet, Canada East, Fortier received his initial musical training at the Petit Séminaire de Saint-Thérèse just outside Montreal where he was a pupil of Father Sauvé. He then pursued further studies with Guillaume Couture and Dominique Ducharme in Montreal. In 1885 Fortier went to France where he studied for the next five years. Among his teachers there were André Gedalge and Ernest Guiraud (music composition). In 1889 he attended the Conservatoire de Paris, the first Canadian to be admitted as a regular student.

In 1890 Fortier returned to Canada to join the teaching staff at the Institut Nazareth in Montreal where he was an instructor for classes in counterpoint, harmony, and singing. He also taught similar courses at the Dames du Sacré-Coeur Convent, the Villa-Maria Convent, and at the Conservatoire of the Canadian Artistic Society. Some of his notable pupils included Jean-Noël Charbonneau, Gabriel Cusson, Frédéric Pelletier, and Édouard LeBel. From 1892 to 1893 he served as the choirmaster for the Notre-Dame Basilica in Montreal. He later worked in Ottawa for many years as a French to English translator for the Canadian federal government, beginning in 1900. He died in Viauville at the age of 74.

== Honors ==
- In 1926 he was awarded an Honorary doctorate from the Université de Montréal.
- In 1985 the city of Montreal named a street in the Pointe-aux-Trembles district after him.
- In 1988 soprano Liette Turner, cellist Alain Aubut, and pianist Réjean Coallier formed the chamber group Ensemble Achille-Fortier, an ensemble dedicated to performing music from Quebec of the 19th century and early 20th century. The group has released several CDs, many of which contain music by Fortier.
