= Gabriel Cusson =

Canadian composer and music educator

Gabriel Cusson (2 April 1903, Roxton Pond, Quebec - 18 Apr 1972, Montreal) was a Canadian composer and music educator. As a composer, his music was heavily influenced by the style of early 20th-century French composers. Most of his work remains unpublished, although a few of his compositions have been recorded including his Sérénade for orchestra and one of his suites by the Orchestre Métropolitain. The Canadian publishing company La Bonne Chanson has printed a number of his folksong arrangements. His other unpublished works include several motets, the cantata À la gloire de Jeanne Mance (1942), and incidental music for Antigone and the biblical dramas Jonathas and Tobie.

== Training ==
Cusson was trained at the Institut Nazareth, a music conservatory in Montreal that awarded degrees through the University of Montreal. While there he studied the cello with Gustave Labelle, singing with Alfred Lamoureux, piano and organ with Arthur Letondal, and music theory with both Achille Fortier and Romain Pelletier. He graduated from the school in 1924 with a Bachelor of Music and that same year won the Prix d'Europe for cello performance. That competition win enabled him to study at the École Normale de Musique de Paris in France from 1924 to 1930 with such teachers as Diran Alexanian (cello), Nadia Boulanger (composition), and Charles Panzéra (voice).

== Career ==
In 1931 Cusson returned to Montreal and became active as both a composer and teacher in that city. As a teacher he first worked as a private tutor in counterpoint, with Jean Papineau-Couture being one of his notable students during the 1930s. In 1943 he joined the music faculty of the newly established Conservatoire de musique du Québec à Montréal (CMQM) at the invitation of Wilfrid Pelletier. He taught at the CMQM through 1971, where his notable students included Gaston Arel, Raymond Daveluy, Kenneth Gilbert, Bernard Lagacé, Aline Letendre, Lucienne L'Heureux-Arel, and Michel Perrault. A recital hall at the conservatoire bears his name. He also served as the president of the Académie de musique du Québec from 1952 to 1953 and again from 1956 to 1959.

Cusson also published works on the teaching of music, including Quelques souvenirs des années and 30 et sur un sujet bien actuel (Vie musicale, December 1970). He also wrote four volumes of ear training music methods and exercises which remain unpublished. Manuscripts of these works and several of his unpublished scores are currently part of the collection at the Bibliothèque et Archives nationales du Québec.
