= Romain-Octave Pelletier II =

Canadian music critic, music producer and violinist

Romain-Octave Pelletier II (sometimes spelled Peltier) (26 August 1904 - 11 January 1968) was a Canadian music critic, music producer, and violinist.

== Early life and career ==
Born in Saint-Lambert, Quebec, Pelletier was a member of a prominent musical family in Montreal. Named after his grandfather, musician Romain-Octave Pelletier I, he was the son of conductor, composer, and music critic Frédéric Pelletier. His uncles Romain Pelletier and Victor Pelletier were also successful musicians. He had his earliest musical training from the men in his family and was a violin student of Albert Chamberland.

Pelletier initially intended to become a lawyer and accordingly pursued law studies at the Université de Montréal where he earned a Bachelor of Arts in 1924 and a Bachelor of Laws in 1927. While a student he began working as a music critic in 1922 for publications like Le Devoir and La Revue moderne. From 1928-1933 he worked as a notary in Montreal.

In 1933 Pelletier began working for the Canadian Radio Broadcasting Commission as a host and commentator for the Canadian national broadcasts of the Metropolitan Opera and the New York Philharmonic. In 1939 he joined the staff of the Canadian Broadcasting Corporation in Montreal as a radio producer where he also served as the assistant record librarian from 1941-1944. He continued to work as a producer for the CBC through 1964 where he was responsible for many programs, including Festivals du Mercredi and The Little Symphonies.
