= Ernest Gagnon =

Canadian folk musician and composer (1834-1915)

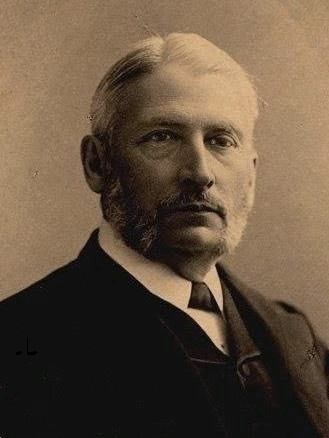
Ernest Gagnon (1834–1915)

Ernest Gagnon (French pronunciation: [ɛʁnɛst ɡaɲɔ̃]; 7 November 1834 – 15 September 1915) was a Canadian folklorist, composer, and organist. He is best known for compiling a large amount of French Canadian folk music which he published as Chansons populaires du Canada in 1865–1867. He was greatly admired for his virtuoso performances on the organ and was also considered an expert at plainsong accompaniment.

== Biography ==
Born in Louiseville, Gagnon was from a prominent family of musicians in Québec City. He is the brother of composer Gustave Gagnon and the uncle of composer Henri Gagnon. His sister Élisabeth was married to pianist Paul Letondal. He studied the organ with Charles Wugk Sabatier. From 1853 to 1864 he was the organist of Saint-Jean-Baptiste Church, and held a similar position at the Notre-Dame Basilica-Cathedral from 1864 to 1876. In 1857 he travelled to Paris after obtaining a study leave and became a pupil of Henri Herz and Alexandre Goria.

Many of his arts songs, choral pieces, and works for solo piano have been published by the Canadian Musical Heritage Society and by Adélard Joseph Boucher. His piano work Stadaconé (1858) was notably the first notated composition to be based on the music of the aboriginal peoples in Canada. He died in Quebec City at the age of 80 and is buried at the Cimetière Notre-Dame-de-Belmont.
