= Calixa Lavallée =

Canadian composer

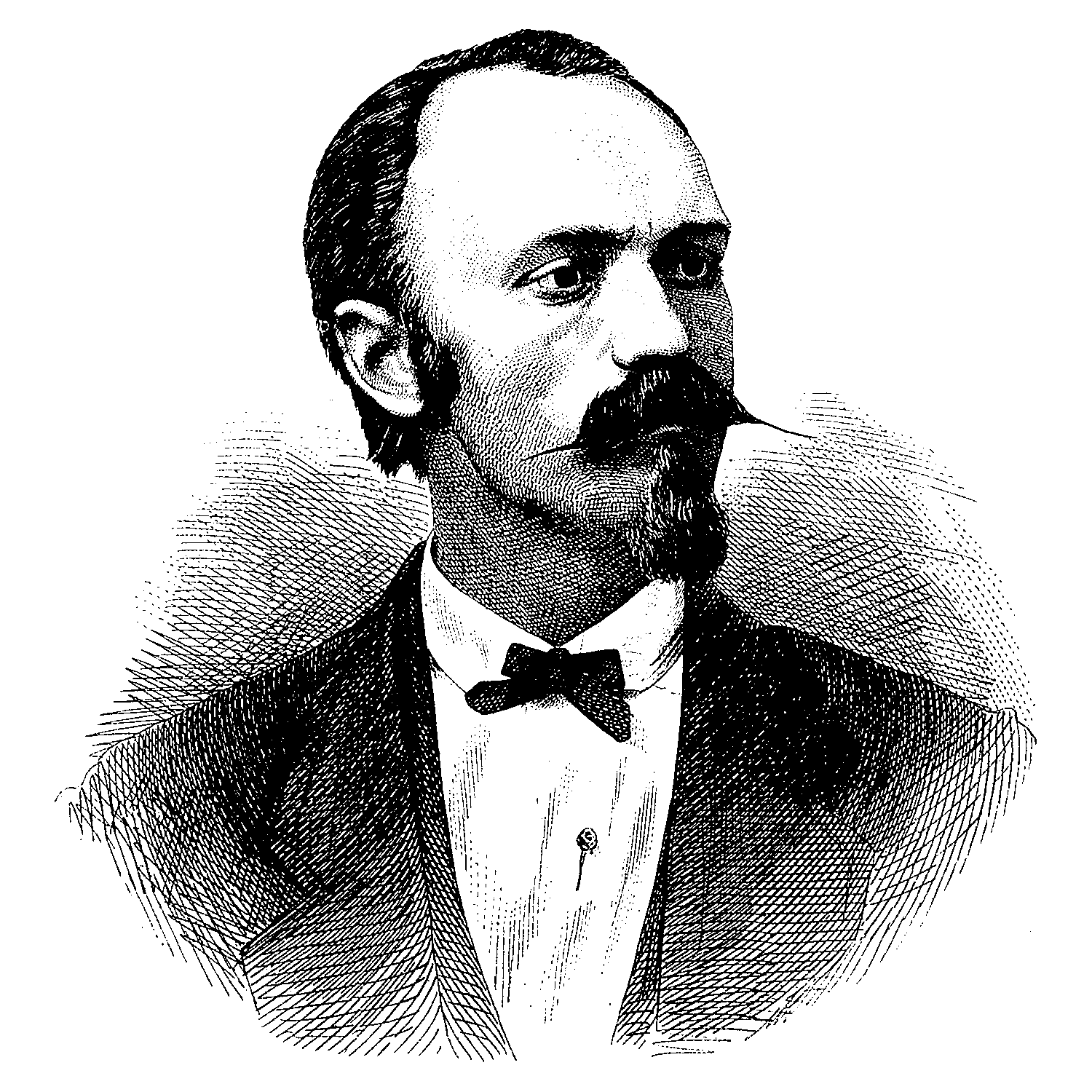
- An illustration of Lavallée from 1873
- Born: Calixte Paquet dit Lavallée; December 28, 1842; Verchères, Province of Canada
- Died: January 21, 1891 (aged 48); Boston, Massachusetts, U.S.
- Resting place: Notre Dame des Neiges Cemetery, Côte-des-Neiges–Notre-Dame-de-Grâce, Montreal
- Occupations: Musician and composer
- Known for: composing the music of the Canadian national anthem "O Canada"
- Spouse: Josephine Gentilly (m. 1867)
- Military career
- Allegiance: United States
- Rank: Private (Musician) Lieutenant (According to some sources)
- Unit: 4th Rhode Island Infantry Regiment
- Conflicts: American Civil War: Battle of Roanoke Island; Battle of New Bern; Battle of South Mountain; Battle of Antietam

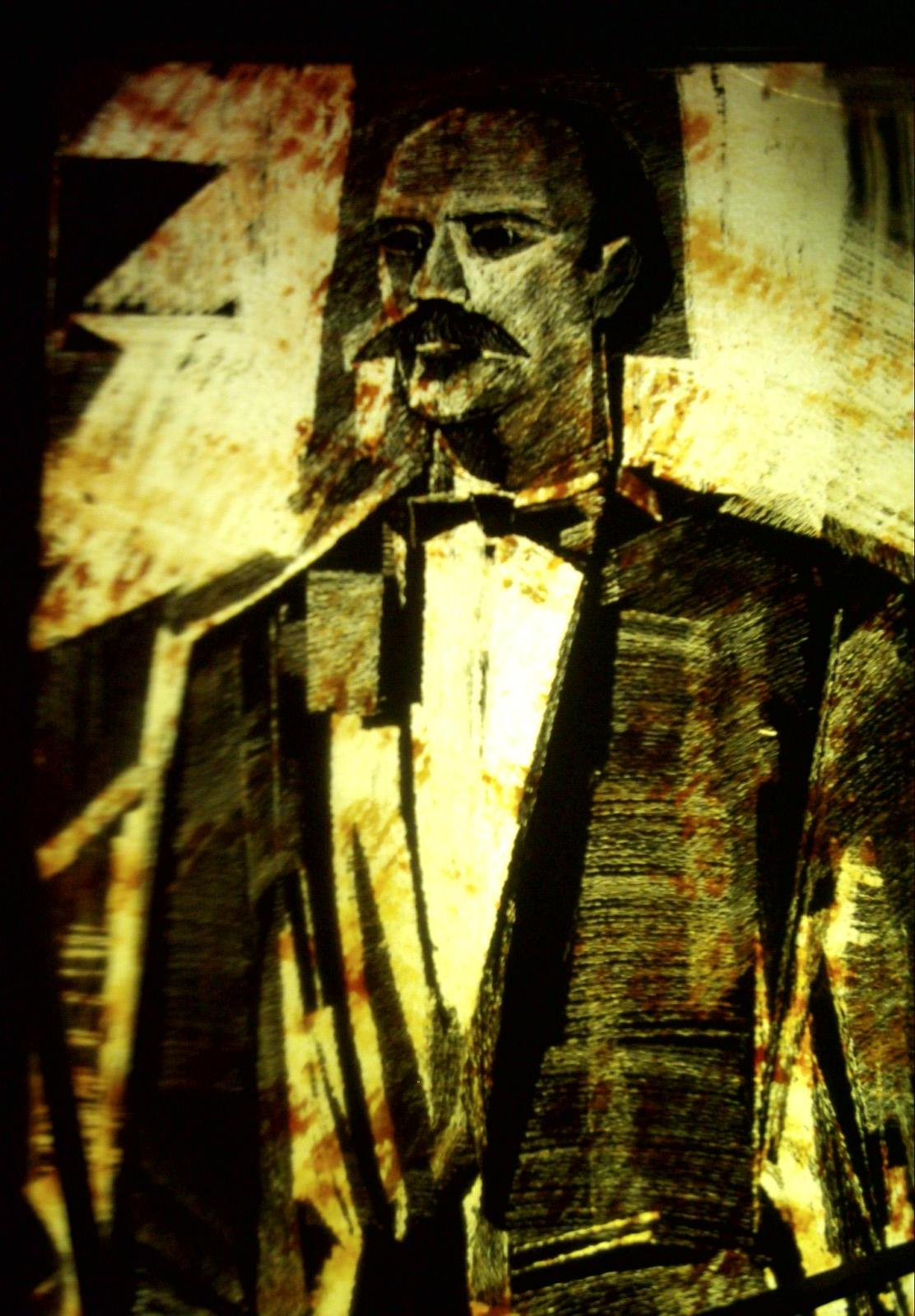
Calixa Lavallée, 1967 art by Frédéric Back at Place-des-Arts metro station in Montreal.

Calixa Lavallée (French pronunciation: [kaliksa lavale]; December 28, 1842 – January 21, 1891) was a Canadian musician and Union Army band musician during the American Civil War. He was born in the Province of Canada. He is best known for composing the music for "O Canada", which officially became the national anthem of Canada in 1980, after a vote in the Senate and the House of Commons. The same 1980 Act of Parliament also changed some of the English lyrics. A further alteration to the English lyrics was made again in 2018. The original French lyrics and the music, however, have remained unchanged since 1880.

== Early life and education ==
Lavallée was born Calixte Paquet dit Lavallée, the son of Jean Baptiste Augustin Paquet dit Lavallée and Charlotte Valentine. He was born near Verchères, a village near present-day Montreal in the Province of Canada (now the Canadian province of Quebec). He was a descendant of Isaac Pasquier, from Poitou, France, who arrived in Nouvelle-France in 1665 as a soldier in the Carignan-Salières regiment. Lavallée's father worked as a blacksmith, logger, bandmaster, self-taught luthier and bandleader, and also worked for the pipe organ builder Joseph Casavant. Calixa Lavallée's mother was Charlotte-Caroline Valentine, descendant of James Valentine, a soldier from Montrose, Scotland who married a Quebecer by the name of Louise Leclerc and then settled down in Verchères, Québec.

Lavallée began his musical education with his father, who taught him organ by age 11. Lavallée also studied in Montréal with Paul Letondal and Charles Wugk Sabatier.

== Career ==
Lavallée gave his first performance at Montreal's Theatre Royal (on Côté Street) on 28 February 1859 and later that year he was hired by Charles Duprez to play violin, cornet, and piano in a travelling minstrel troupe. With this company, the New Orleans Minstrels, Lavallée travelled through much of the United States in the years leading up to the outbreak of the Civil War.

On September 17, 1861, Lavallée enlisted in the 4th Rhode Island Infantry Regiment in Providence, as a private and a musician in the regimental band. He served with the 4th in the American Civil War until he was mustered out on October 3, 1862. He then rejoined Duprez's company and continued to tour until the fall of 1863, when he returned to Montreal.

Between December 1863 and the early months of 1866 Lavallée organized concerts, composed and taught. In 1866, he was hired once again by Duprez and left for the US, where he would remain until 1872. In December 1867, he married an American woman, Josephine Gentilly, while in Lowell, Massachusetts.

After two years in Paris, Lavallée returned to Montreal in July 1875, where he continued to perform and compose. Between 1875 and 1880, he lived in Montreal and Quebec City, where he worked as a pianist, organist and music teacher, and also conducted orchestral and operatic productions in concert halls, including the Montréal Academy of Music in Montréal, Quebec City and in many U.S. cities. Among his pupils was composer Alexis Contant.

To celebrate St. Jean-Baptiste Day in 1880, the Lieutenant Governor of Québec, Théodore Robitaille, commissioned Lavallée to compose "O Canada" to a patriotic poem by Adolphe-Basile Routhier. After some financial difficulties in Canada, Lavallée again moved to the United States. In his later life he promoted the idea of union between Canada and the U.S.

== Later life and death ==
During the later years of his life, Lavallée was the choirmaster at the Cathedral of the Holy Cross in Boston, and he died penniless in that city in 1891. As the result of the campaign by the Montréal-based music director of the Victoria's Rifles, Joseph-Laurent Gariépy, his remains were returned to Montréal and reinterred at Côte-des-Neiges Cemetery in 1933.

== Selected musical works ==
- Peacocks in Difficulties/Loulou, comic opera
- The Bridal Rose Overture, operetta
- The King of Diamonds, overture
- L'Absence, lyrics by Remi Tremblay, 1882–1885
- L'Oiseau Mouche, Bluette de Salon, Op.11, 1865?
- La Rose Nuptiale, brass quintet
- Une Couronne de Lauriers, Caprice de Genre, Op.10, 1865
- Le Papillon (The Butterfly) Étude de Concert for piano, 1874/1884
- La Patrie (1874).
- Marche funèbre, 1878
- Violette, cantilène, lyrics by Napoleon Legendre and P.J. Curran, 1879
- "O Canada", 1880
- The Widow, 1881, comic opera (known in French as La veuve)
- TIQ (The Indian Question), Settled at Last, 1882, comic opera

== Legacy ==
The village of Calixa-Lavallée, southeast of Montreal, is named after him. The professional training school Calixa-Lavallée in Quebec also bears his name. The following roads were named to honour Calixa Lavallée:

- Avenue Calixa-Lavallée, located in Shawinigan, Quebec, Canada.
- Avenue Calixa-Lavallée, located in Quebec, Quebec, Canada.
- Rue Calixa-Lavallée, located in Magog, Quebec, Canada.
- Rue Calixa-Lavallée, located in Boucherville, Quebec, Canada.
- Rue Calixa-Lavallée, located in Repentigny, Quebec, Canada.
- Rue Calixa-Lavallée, a dead-end street entering into Lafontaine Park, Montreal, Quebec, Canada.
- Avenue Calixa-Lavallée located in Laval, Québec, Canada.
- Calixa-Lavallée Privée (Calixa-Lavallée Pvt.) a small dead-end laneway on the University of Ottawa campus

== See also ==
- Calixa-Lavallée Award
- Music of Canada
- List of Canadian composers
- Canada in the American Civil War

== Bibliography ==
Notes

References

- Francis, R. Douglas; Jones, Richard &Donald Smith, Robert Wardhaugh (2011). Destinies: Canadian History Since Confederation (2011 ed.). Nelson Education Limited. ISBN 9780176502515. - Total pages: 608
- Thompson, Brian (2015). Anthems and Minstrel Shows: The Life and Times of Calixa Lavallée, 1842-1891. Montreal; Kingston; Ithaca: McGill-Queen's University Press. ISBN 9780773545557.
