= Jeanne Landry =

Canadian composer and pianist

- Born: May 3, 1922; Ottawa, Ontario, Canada
- Died: August 2, 2011 (aged 89); Quebec City, Quebec, Canada
- Education: École de musique Vincent-d'Indy
- Occupations: Composer; Pianist; Teacher
- Years active: 1940–1989
- Employer: Université Laval
- Children: 1
- Awards: Prix d'Europe

Jeanne Landry (May 3, 1922 – August 2, 2011) was a Canadian composer, pianist and teacher who taught counterpoint and harmony at the Faculty of Music at Université Laval from 1951 to 1983. She began as a solo pianist in 1940 and was named the 1946 winner of the Prix d'Europe grant. Landry gave public recitals, appeared on CBC Radio and was an accompanist for various composers and instrumentalists and singers in concert, radio and television. She retired from teaching in 1983, and devoted her time to composition and writing free-form poems.

== Early life and education ==
On May 3, 1922, Landry was born in Ottawa, Ontario. She had one sister and one half-brother. From aged four, she displayed talent for music and performed melodies on the piano by ear, something her parents encouraged her to do. Landry began studying piano at Ottawa's Grey Nuns' Convent when she was nine and continued from 1934 to 1942 under Irene Miller. She settled in Montreal in 1942 and studied with Arthur Letondal until 1944 before enrolling at the École de musique Vincent-d'Indy to be taught by Jean Dansereau on the piano and by Claude Champagne in theoretical subjects. In June 1945, Landry won the Prix Archambault, and graduated from the Vincent d'Indy with the Bachelor of Music degree with high honors and a diploma for Gregorian singing in November 1945. She was judged by a jury to have won the Prix d'Europe grant in a two-day competition held at Plateau Auditorium against nine others in June 1946 with an almost perfect score. The achievement earned Landry a C$3,000 scholarship to further her education in France. She went to Paris to study piano with Yves Nat and counterpoint and harmony with Nadia Boulanger and Noël Gallon.

== Career ==
Landry made her debut appearance as a solo pianist and a complete soloist at the St. Jean Baptist parish hall in May 1940. She went back to Canada in 1948, and from the same year, was an active collaborator on radio and in the early years of Canadian television. Landry gave public recitals, made appearances on CBC Radio and was an accompanist for the Minute Opera between 1949 and 1952. She accompanied tenor Jean-Paul Jeannotte for a quarter of a century in concert, radio, and television, performing in Austria, Canada, France, the Soviet Union and the United States. In 1950, she performed percussion with Jean-Marie Beaudet in the Montreal premiere of Béla Bartók's Sonata. She performed in the premiere and recording Roger Matton's Concerto with percussion with Jean-Marie Beaudet in 1955 and in the Canadian premiere of Pierre Boulez's Structures Book 1 with Serge Garant in 1958. Between 1957 and 1958, Landry toured for the Jeunesses Musicales du Canada with clarinetist Rafael Masella and accompanied other instrumentalists and singers such as Fernande Chiocchio, Joseph Rouleau and Jacques Simard. She performed with flutist Alain Marion at the Orford Art Centre in 1976 and often performed with pianist Robert Weisz, appearing in Bohuslav Martinů's Two-Piano Concerto with the Quebec Symphony Orchestra.

In 1951, Landry first taught at the Faculty of Music at Université Laval. She taught counterpoint and harmony for more than 20 hours per week, training a plethora of students and also conducted an accompanying class. She, Garant, Otto Joachim and François Morel established the Musique de notre temps organisation in 1956. Landry retired in 1983 and was made professor emeritus. During her retirement, she dedicated her time to composition, including multiple piano pieces, two song cycles, and a viola and piano sonata. One of her organ pieces Orah was recorded by Jean-Guy Proulx in 1990. She received help to prepare the publication of her works from music professor and longtime Laval colleague Chantal Masson-Bourque. Overall, Landry created 70 musical works and 300 free-form poems. She said she liked to write poetry because "you really get to the heart of something. In poems, there is no verbiage, a poem, it is a world gathered in a formula, that says the essential."

== Personal life ==
Landry was the mother of one son. On August 2, 2011, she died at the Hôtel-Dieu de Québec in Quebec City. A religious service to celebrate her life was held at Saint-Dominique Church in the afternoon of August 5 before being cremated at Cimetière Notre-Dame-de-Belmont.

== Legacy ==
In September 1998, a tribute concert where some of Landry's works were performed by colleagues and friends was organised by Radio-Canada, the Faculty of Music at Université Laval and the Domaine Forget at Saint-Irénée, Quebec.
