= Alain Gagnon =

Canadian composer and music educator

Alain Gagnon (22 May 1938 − 26 March 2017) was a Canadian composer and music educator based in Laval, Quebec. His compositions have been performed by ensembles throughout Canada.

== Early life and education ==
Gagnon was born in Trois-Pistoles, Quebec. He began teaching himself the piano as a young child; in 1951, at the age of 13, he began taking music lessons at the Rimouski Seminary with Father Philippe-Antoine Lavoie with whom he studied until 1958. In 1960 he entered the Conservatoire de musique du Québec à Québec where he was an organ student with Henri Gagnon.

After Gagnon died in 1961, Alain transferred to the Université Laval where he studied composition with Roger Matton. He graduated from Laval with Bachelor of Music in 1963 and a Master of Music in composition in 1964. He continued with further studies privately under Jocelyne Binet in 1964–1965. He was awarded the Governor-General's Medal in 1963 and was honoured with a medal for the Government of France in 1964.

In 1965 Gagnon won the Prix d'Europe and was awarded additional scholarships from the Canada Council and the Quebec Ministry of Education. Those honours enabled him to pursue graduate studies in France at the École Normale de Musique de Paris with Henri Dutilleux and at the École César Franck with Olivier Alain in 1965–1966. He studied for a short period of time at the Institut de Sonologie of Utrecht in 1966 and in 1967 at the Geneva Conservatory with André-François Marescotti.

== Career ==
Gagnon joined the music faculty of the Université Laval in 1967 where he taught music theory, music analysis, and music composition for more than 40 years. He joined the Canadian League of Composers and was an associate of the Canadian Music Centre. The Quebec Symphony Orchestra commissioned his Prélude and performed the works premiere in 1969 under conductor Pierre Dervaux.

In 1980 he composed "Pastourelle", his first composition for organ. A piano composition, "Jeux dans l'espace : poème, opus 27" was published a year later.

In 1998 Gagnon's work Chansons d'Orient was premiered by the Cantori New York chamber choir.

Gagnon died 26 March 2017, in Quebec City.
