= Claude Marc Bourget =

Canadian musician

- Born: 1956; Montreal, Quebec, Canada
- Occupations: Composer, musician, writer, journalist

Claude Marc Bourget (born 1956) is a musician, writer and Quebec journalist. He was first an Arts Student, and an autodidact musician (both in composition and Piano).Editor, he works to Editions du Beffroi and he collaborates to the Égards magazine with Jean Renaud, Luc Gagnon and Richard Bastien. He has produced, for Égards, a polemic study on Pierre Le Moyne d'Iberville.

Bourget was born in 1956 in Montreal. Autodidact, he became known in 1982 with his appearance at Musak Noise Sound Festival (Montreal's Vehicle Art Gallery), where several experimental artists from Montreal and New York participated" with a concert for improv'ed solo piano and recorded piece, entitled Resonant Tension /prolongation.

Shortly after, came the creation and production of Erdro Erdrosed, Contemporary Improv and recording system for piano, acoustic guitar, percussion, 3 tape recorders and 3 technicians. A more complex and better structured version, Erdro Erdrosed II (for 6 tape recorders working live in a multiple re-injection system), will be created in 1983 at the Musee dart contemporain de Montreal.

1983 marks Bourget joining the Ensemble de Musique Improvisee de Montreal (E.M.I.M.). He presents a solo concert at the Montreal Jazz Festival. After a tour in France with the E.M.I.M. (Paris, Metz, Nancy), he suddenly puts a stop to concerts. Since 1985, he is devoted to literature. 2006 marks his return to composing and improvisation.

He has been, for a while, Communications Director for various engineering firms, and counsellor to large firms (engineering, banks, insurance), while still working at literature.

In 2007, he made a comeback to music and especially to the piano. Improv master, but in a style which mixes modern Jazz to Classical music (Debussy, Ravel, Stravinsky) or Contemporary, he mostly performs solo.

== Publications ==
- La bataille des Alberti, followed by Le Sagittaire d'Evesham, Récits, Beffroi, Québec (1990).
- De la décréation du monde, Cinq entretiens avec Jean Renaud, Beffroi, Québec. (1994)
- Les Immortels de Mathijsen, Detective story, Humanitas, Montréal, Montréal (2000)

== Discography ==
- SECOND TIME, Improvisations Cycle, piano, Quebec Improvised Musics Society, 2008
- MUSIQUES DE BALLET, piano, Recorded in Françoys-Bernier Concert Hall Domaine Forget, Saint-Irénée, Canada, Audience, 2009
- NOVIAUS TANZ, for violin, cello, virtual violins & virtual double bass, Metis Islands Music, 2012
- GREENLAND, THE SONG OF THE ICE ("Groendland, ou le Chant des glaces"), for solo violin (Frédéric Bednarz), Metis Islands Music, 2012
