= Lescot =

Lescot is a surname. Notable people with the surname include:

- Jean-Baptiste Fleuriot-Lescot (1761–94), French architect, revolutionary
- Hortense Haudebourt-Lescot (1784–1845), French painter
- Andrée Lescot (active 1950–60s), Haitian singer, daughter of Élie
- Élie Lescot (1883–1974), President of Haiti
- Pierre Lescot (1510–1578), French architect

== See also ==
- Lescot Wing, the oldest portion existing above ground level of the Louvre Palace, in Paris, France
- Lescott
