= Pierre Rolland (musician) =

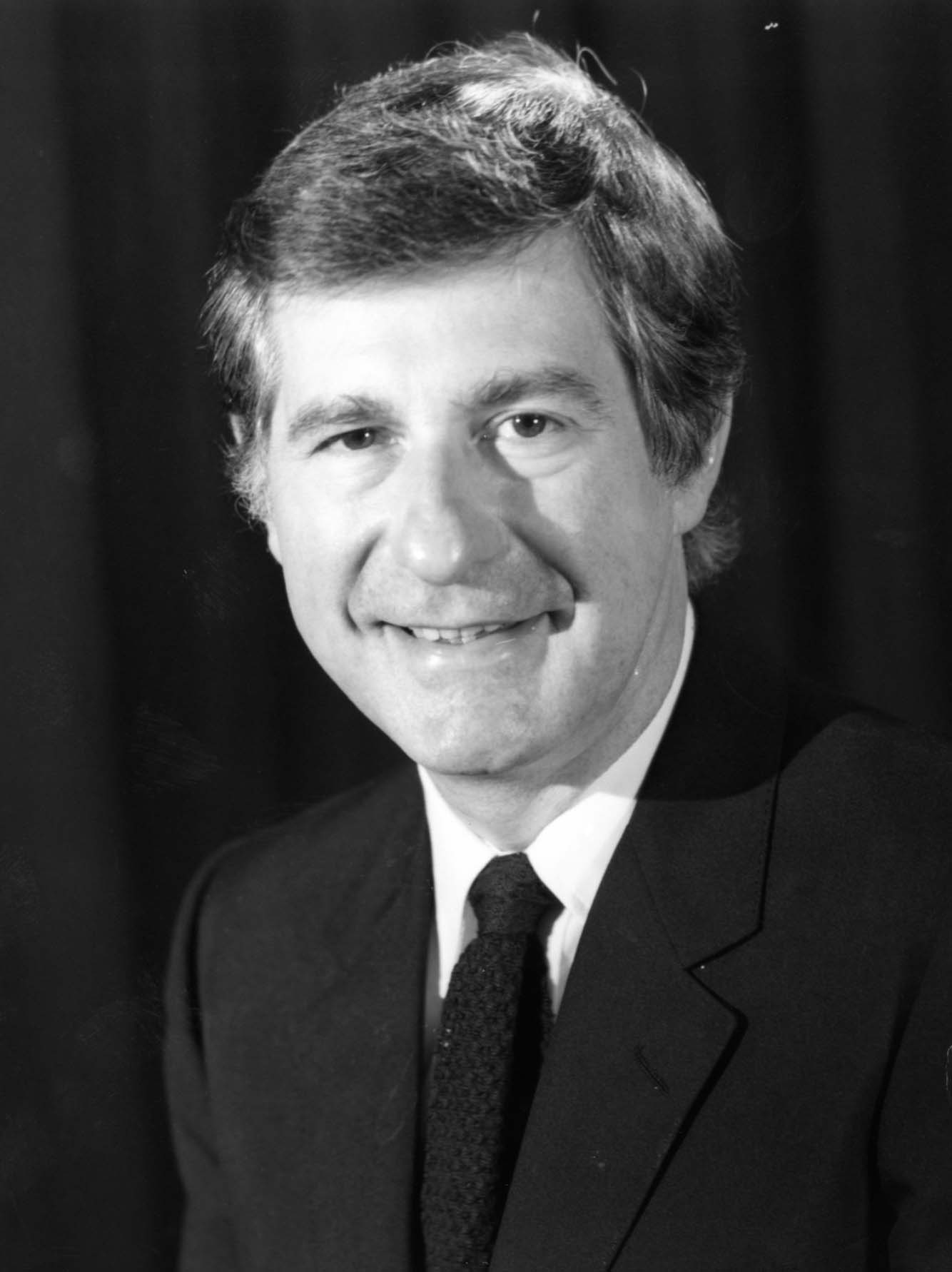
- Rolland in 1984
- Born: October 13, 1931; Quebec City, Quebec, Canada
- Died: 29 November 2011 (aged 80)
- Occupation: Musician

Pierre Rolland C.M. (13 October 1931 - 29 November 2011) was a Canadian oboist, english horn player, radio broadcaster, music critic, music educator, and arts administrator. He is the father of cellist Sophie Rolland and violinist Brigitte Rolland.

== Life and career ==
Born in Quebec City, Rolland began his professional training in 1947 at the age of 15 at the Conservatoire de musique du Québec à Montréal. He studied there for seven years under such teachers as Fernand Gillet (oboe), Jeanne Landry (harmony), Gilberte Martin (theory, solfège), and Jean Papineau-Couture (dictation). In 1954 he entered the New England Conservatory (NEC) where he continued to study under Gillet and earned a Bachelor of Music in 1957. During his years at the NEC he spent his summers studying at the Pierre Monteux School. He later pursued further studies at the Conservatoire de Paris in 1960–1961 with Étienne Baudo (oboe); Eugène Bigot and Louis Fourestier (conducting), and Maurice Franck (theory).

Rolland served as principal english horn player for the Montreal Symphony Orchestra from 1961 to 1984. He had earlier played the oboe for the Halifax Symphony Orchestra (1954) and the Ottawa Philharmonic (1957-1960). In 1970 he founded the Pierre-Rolland Quintet with whom he actively performed for over a decade. He also played in several ensembles for the Canadian Broadcasting Corporation. From 1965 to 1969 he wrote record reviews for Jeunesses musicales Chronicle and from 1975 to 1979 he wrote music criticism for the newspaper Le Devoir. In 1977 he helped establish the Orchestre des jeunes du Québec. He has also hosted or served as interviewer for multiple CBC Radio programs, including Music de chez-nous, Invitation à la musique, and Faisons de la musique. From 1980 to 1989 he was Director of the Orford Arts Centre. He also served for several years as the Director of the Pro Musica Society.

In 1973 Rolland joined the faculty of the Université de Montréal in 1973 where he later served as dean of the music department from 1984 to 1988. He also taught on the music faculties of the Université du Québec à Montréal, the Cégep de Saint-Laurent, the École Normale de Musique de Montreal, and for several years at the École de musique Vincent-d'Indy.

In 2010, Pierre Rolland was appointed a member of the Order of Canada.
