= Ermitage =

Ermitage may refer to:

- Ermitage (concert hall), performance hall in Montreal, Quebec
- Ermitage, and Ermitage blanc, the white wine grape Marsanne
- Ermitage International School Paris, France

== See also ==
- Hermitage (disambiguation), including L'Ermitage
