= Anna-Marie Globenski =

Canadian pianist (1929–2008)

- Born: July 2, 1929; Saint-Barthélemy, Quebec, Canada
- Died: September 28, 2008 (aged 79); Quebec City, Quebec, Canada
- Education: École de musique Vincent-d'Indy; Conservatoire de Paris; Academy of Fine Arts Vienna; Indiana University Bloomington
- Occupations: Pianist; Teacher
- Years active: 1956–2007

Anna-Marie Globenski (July 2, 1929 – September 28, 2008) was a Canadian pianist and teacher who taught at the École de musique Vincent-d'Indy from 1960 to 1963 and Université Laval for 30 years. She was an accompanist for the Conservatoire de musique du Québec à Montréal, appeared on CBC Radio and CBC Television and recorded three pages of music from various composers. Globenski was a member of various juries and various music competitions in Canada and Europe. She established the Fonds Fondation Anna-Marie-Globenski in 2001. In early 2005, Laval's preparatory music school was named after Globenski to celebrate 30 years of her at the institution.

== Early life and education ==
On July 2, 1929, Globenski was born in Saint-Barthélemy, Quebec, to Hubert Globenski and Anna-Marie Fortier. Globenski was part of one of the first families of Polish origin to reside in Canada, and had one sister. From 1946 to 1951, she studied piano with Jean Dansereau and composition theory with Claude Champagne at the École de musique Vincent-d'Indy in Montreal. In 1951, Globenski received the Prix d'Europe, allowing her to study abroad for two years. She studied in the foreigners class with Marcel Ciampi at the Conservatoire de Paris from 1951 to 1952 and the Academy of Fine Arts Vienna between 1952 and 1956, the latter with Bruno Siedlhofer.

== Career ==
Globenski received the honorable mention of Diplome d'Honneur by the International Competition for Musical Performers in Geneva in 1954. In the following year, her voice was heard on radio in Vienna, and she became the first Canadian to partake in the Frederic Chopin International Competition in Warsaw. Upon returning to Canada, Globenski toured for the JMC between 1956 and 1957 and appeared on CBC Radio as a chamber musician and soloist, particularly Recital. She also had appearances on CBC Television. From 1960 to 1962, she taught at the École Vincent-d'Indy and was an accompanist for the Conservatoire de musique du Québec à Montréal between 1960 and 1963. Globenski took summer courses at Indiana University Bloomington from 1963 to 1967.

In 1963, she became affiliated with Université Laval, becoming a professor in primarily piano and piano paedogy. Globenski and the violinist Liliane Garnier-Lesage in 1964 recorded pages by Béla Bartók, Ludwig van Beethoven, Claude Debussy, Fritz Kreisler, Niccolò Paganini, Maurice Ravel and Henryk Wieniawski. In 1978, she became Laval's director of the graduate program, before leaving the role in 1980 to become director of the instrumental program until 1982. Globenski served as director from 1985 to 1989. In 1980, she was artistic advisor to Quebec City's Institut canadien. She and the Quatuor Laval performed pieces by Louis Vierne and Charles-Marie Widor in 1995 and the works of Alexander Duff, Ernest, Gustave Gagnon, Calixa Lavallée, Theodore Frederic Molt and Charles Wugk Sabatier five years later. Globenski was invited to serve as a member of the juries of the Prix d'Europe, the Ministry of Culture and Communications, the Ministry of Education and Higher Education and various music competitions in Europe and Canada.

== Personal life ==
On September 28, 2008, she died at the Hôpital de l'Enfant-Jésus in Quebec City. Globenski was interred at Cimetière Saint-Michel de Sillery following a funeral service at the Cathedral-Basilica of Notre-Dame de Québec on October 3.

== Legacy ==
The Fonds Fondation Anna-Marie-Globenski (English: Anna-Marie-Globenski Foundation Fund) was established by Globenski in 2001 to "encourage the teaching of music and to help prepare for the pursuit of a career by granting scholarships or scholarships and prizes for excellence" and to "support activities or organizations which have to meet human and social needs". In early 2005, Laval's preparatory music school was renamed the École préparatoire de musique Anna-Marie Globenski following a $400,000 donation to celebrate 30 years of her at the institution. The school provides pedagogical support for Quebec private music teachers supervised by specialist members of its academic policy committee.
