= Jean-Marie Beaudet =

Canadian musician (1908–1971)

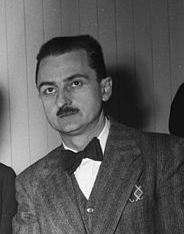
Jean-Marie Beaudet

Jean-Marie Beaudet (20 February 1908 – 19 March 1971) was a Canadian conductor, organist, pianist, radio producer, and music educator. He had a long career with the Canadian Broadcasting Corporation, serving variously as a music producer, programing director, conductor, and administrator. With the CBC Symphony Orchestra he conducted the premiere recordings of works by many Canadian composers, including pieces by Maurice Blackburn, Claude Champagne, J.-J. Gagnier, Clermont Pépin, and Healey Willan.

== Early life and education ==
Born in Thetford Mines, Beaudet was the brother of pianist Pierre Beaudet. He began his musical education at the Collège de Lévis where he was a piano and organ student of Father Alphonse Tardif. He pursued further studies in those instruments with Henri Gagnon and Robert Talbot at the Séminaire de Québec where he earned a bachelor's degree in 1928. In 1929 he won the prestigious Prix d'Europe for organ performance, a prize which provided him the funds necessary to continue his education in France from 1929 to 1932. He studied with Pierre Lucas at the American Conservatory at Fontainebleau and with Louis Aubert (harmony), Marcel Dupré (organ), and Yves Nat (piano) at the Conservatoire de Paris.

== Early career in Quebec City ==
In 1932 Beaudet returned to Canada to assume the post of organist at the Église Saint-Dominique in Quebec City and to join the music faculty at the Université Laval. He remained in both positions for the next five years, during which time he was also active as a concert pianist and conductor. Between 1935 and 1937 he made several appearances with the Montreal Symphony Orchestra (MSO) under conductor Wilfrid Pelletier, including performances of Ludwig van Beethoven's Piano Concerto No. 3 and Robert Schumann's Piano Concerto. He also was invited by Pelletier to conduct the MSO in concerts in 1936 and 1937. In 1937 he performed in concerts with the Cercle philharmonique de Québec.

== Work for the CBC ==
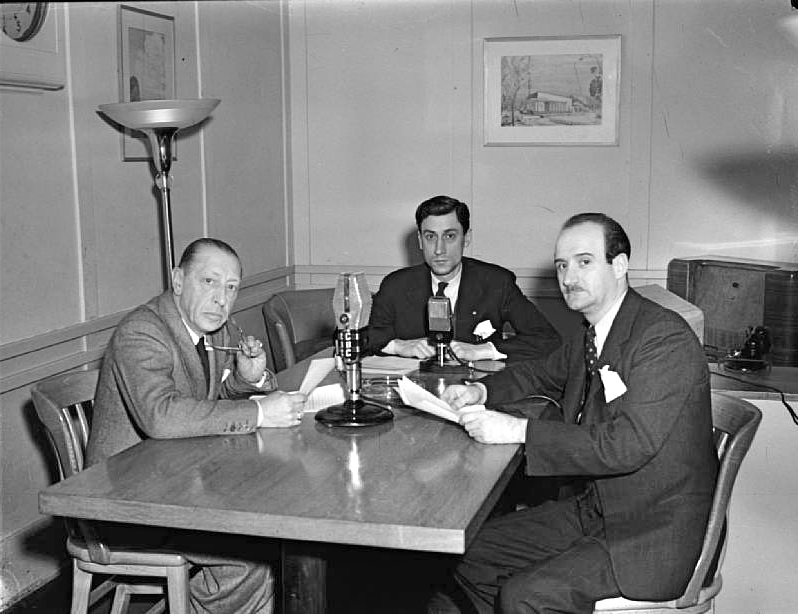
Jean-Marie Beaudet (right), with Roger Baulu (center) and Igor Stravinsky (left), in a CBC studio in Montréal in 1945

In 1937 Beaudet joined the staff of the Canadian Broadcasting Corporation where he held a variety of posts through 1947, including program director for the Quebec region, national music supervisor, and program director for the French network. He played an influential role in making music the primary focus of CBC programing, as opposed to news, drama, and talk radio. The CBC commissioned its first two operas, both by Healey Willan, as a result of his leadership: Transit through Fire: An Odyssey of 1942 (1942) and Deirdre (1945).

Beaudet also conducted numerous broadcasts for CBC Radio between 1936 and 1946, including performances of Hector Berlioz's L'enfance du Christ, Gabriel Fauré's Requiem, and Arthur Honegger's Le roi David among other important works. He also conducted 8 programs of music by Canadian composers for the NBC Radio series Music of the New World in the summer of 1944 for a collaborative project with the CBC. He left the staff of the CBC in 1947, but later worked for the organization again in 1948–1949 as director of the Radio Canada International program Music and Musicians of Canada.

While working for the CBC in the 1940s, Beaudet was also active as a guest conductor and pianist. He led performances of Georges Bizet's Carmen with singers from the Metropolitan Opera in 1943 at the St Denis Theatre. On 13 May 1946 he conducted his first European concert, a program of Canadian works, with the Czech Philharmonic Orchestra at the Prague Spring Festival. That same year he had a great personal triumph performing a recital of piano works by Claude Debussy at the Ermitage.

== Later career ==
After leaving the staff of the CBC, Beaudet joined the music faculties of both the Conservatoire de musique du Québec à Montréal (CMM) and the École de musique Vincent-d'Indy in 1947. He taught at both institutions for the next five years, and notably conducted the orchestra at the CMM. He included among his students Jocelyne Binet and Josephte Dufresne. He was also active as an accompanist throughout Canada during those years, playing in recitals given by Raoul Jobin, Marjorie Lawrence, Ezio Pinza, Georges Thill, and Ninon Vallin among others. He also appeared as one half of a piano duo with partner Jeanne Landry.

In 1949 Beaudet conducted performances of Giacomo Puccini's Tosca at the Montreal Festivals, and led performances of Darius Milhaud's Le pauvre matelot for the Minute Opera. That same year he also conducted Bizet's incidental music for a production of Alphonse Daudet's play L'Arlésienne in St-Laurent, Quebec. In 1951 he was engaged by the CBC to conduct performances of Charles Gounod's Faust and broadcasts with the Montreal Symphony Orchestra, the Quebec Symphony Orchestra, the Vancouver Symphony Orchestra, and the Winnipeg Symphony Orchestra.

In 1952–1953 Beaudet went on sabbatical to Paris through a grant awarded to him by the Royal Society of Canada. Upon his return to Montreal in October 1953, he led 16 performances of Puccini's Madama Butterfly at the Variétés lyriques. Later that year he assumed the post of director of production and program planning at CBC Radio in Toronto. He remained in that position through 1957, during which time he conducted for numerous radio and television broadcasts. He was particularly active as an opera conductor at the CBC. He also frequently conducted the CBC Symphony Orchestra from 1953 to 1964. From 1957 to 1959 he served as CBC's representative in Paris.

Beaudet was the executive secretary of the Canadian Music Centre from 1959 to 1961, after which he worked for the last time at the CBC as the assistant vice-president in charge of programming from 1961 to 1964. He was appointed the first music director for the National Arts Centre in 1964, where he remained until his death a seven years later. He notably was responsible for assembling the National Arts Centre Orchestra at its founding.

== Death and legacy ==
Having never retired, Beaudet died in Ottawa in 1971 at the age of 63. Later that year he was posthumously awarded the Canadian Music Council Medal and the University of Ottawa created a fund for aspiring conductors in his name. In 1988 the Canada Council founded the Jean-Marie Beaudet Award for young conductors.

== Bibliography ==
- Beaudet, Josée (2014). Jean-Marie Beaudet, l'homme-orchestre : récit biographique et chronologie musicale (in French). [Anjou, Québec]: Fides.
- Beaudet, Josée (2020). "L'amour des ondes: Jean-Marie Beaudet and CBC/SRC". In Sallis, Friedemann; Landwehr, Regina (eds.). John P.L. Roberts, the CBC/Radio Canada, and Art Music. Cambridge Scholars. pp. 44–66.
