= Roman theatre of Lillebonne =

Ancient Roman theater in Lillebonne, France

Roman Theatre of Lillebonne
- Théâtre antique de Lillebonne
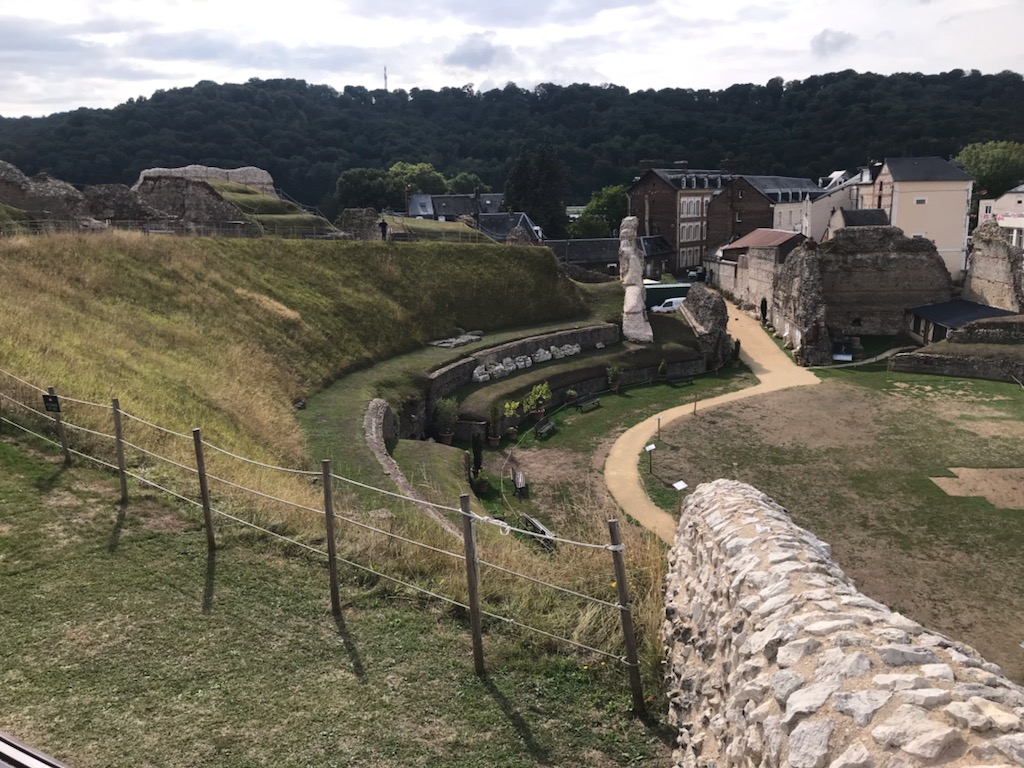
- General view of the cavea.
- Interactive map of Roman Theatre of Lillebonne
- 49.517675°N 0.536753°E
- Type: Roman theatre
- Location: Lillebonne, Seine-Maritime, Normandy, France
- Part of: Juliobona

Monument historique
- Designated: 1840
- Reference no.: PA00100732

The Roman Theatre of Lillebonne is an ancient entertainment venue located in the former city of Juliobona, now Lillebonne, in France.

Constructed in the 1st century AD by utilizing a natural hillside for support, the structure was rebuilt and enlarged during the 2nd and 3rd centuries before being repurposed as a fortress at the end of the 3rd century. Despite research interruptions lasting several decades, the theatre has been the subject of regular excavations since the early 19th century. As of the 21st century, only the stage area—currently covered by a modern road—remains unexcavated. It was officially designated as a monument historique in the original 1840 protection list.

== Location ==
The theatre is situated south of the ancient city of Juliobona, near the main Roman roads. It is partially built into a hillside to the south, which dictated its orientation: the cavea (seating area) rests on the hill to the south, while the arena and stage building are located to the north on a naturally flat plain.

== History of Research ==
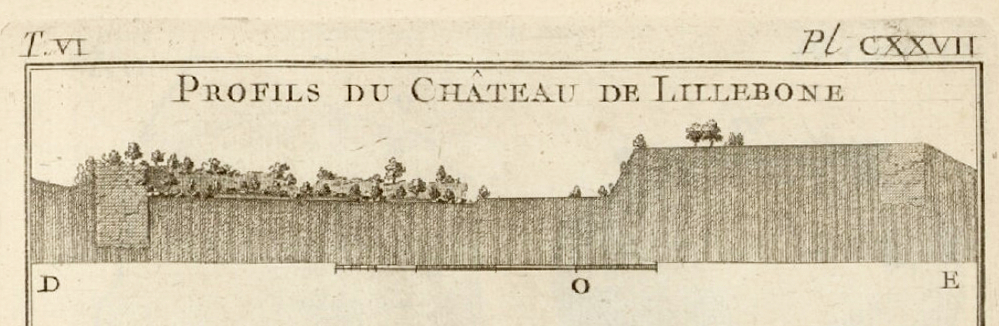
Cross-section of the theatre from south (D) to north (E) by Anne Claude de Caylus.

Until 1740, descriptions of the Lillebonne site failed to mention the presence of a theatre. It was first identified by the Count of Caylus in 1764. Destructive excavations began in 1812; François Rever, who accessed the findings to establish a floor plan, formally identified it as a Roman theatre. In 1818, the Seine-Inférieure department purchased the site. Excavations continued until 1840, when the monument was included in France's first list of protected historic monuments. However, the theatre was largely neglected until the end of the century, leading to degradation of the ruins despite occasional consolidation work.

Excavations resumed from 1908 to 1915 using improved techniques that caused less damage, with formal reports published. Following World War I, work did not resume until 1935 under Albert Grenier but was again halted in 1939. Between 1940 and 1944, the remains of the German sector commander for Lillebonne were buried within the theatre grounds.

In 1960, after twenty years of abandonment, the theatre was overgrown with vegetation. A major clearing operation and new excavations were launched under Maurice Yvart (1960–1962) and later Georges Duval starting in 1974.

In 2000, a program to diagnose the theatre's condition was launched alongside a re-examination of all prior documentation. The site was subsequently opened to the public. The most recent excavation campaign took place from 2007 to 2009, led by Vincenzo Mutarelli; it aimed to verify documentary conclusions through field research and better integrate the ancient monument into the modern city's urban planning.

== Description and Phases ==
=== Description ===
The theatre measures 106.50 metres (349.4 ft) from west to east (major axis). Since the northern section remains unexcavated, the north-south dimension (minor axis) is estimated at 94.70 metres (310.7 ft); the arena measures approximately 47.30 by 35.50 metres (155.2 ft × 116.5 ft).

The cavea is partially built into a hill. Its middle section is "placed" directly on the modified slope; the upper part is constructed using masonry boxes filled with rubble, while the lower part uses masonry to extend the slope down to the arena. This layout allows spectators to sit with their backs to the sun, preventing glare during performances. Seating tiers (gradins) rested on supporting walls and cunei (wedge-shaped seating sections).

The stage building (proscaenium), which has not been excavated, appears to extend 12 to 13 metres (39 to 43 ft) deep beyond the arena, currently situated beneath a modern road and square.

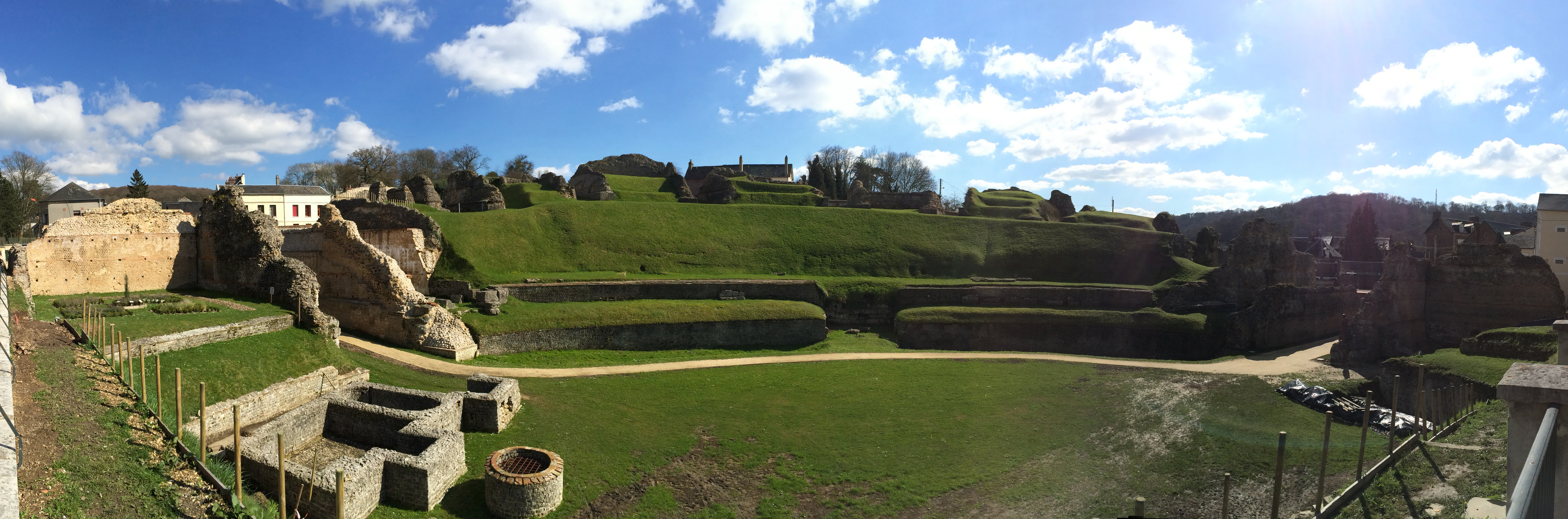
General view of the theatre.

=== Chronology ===
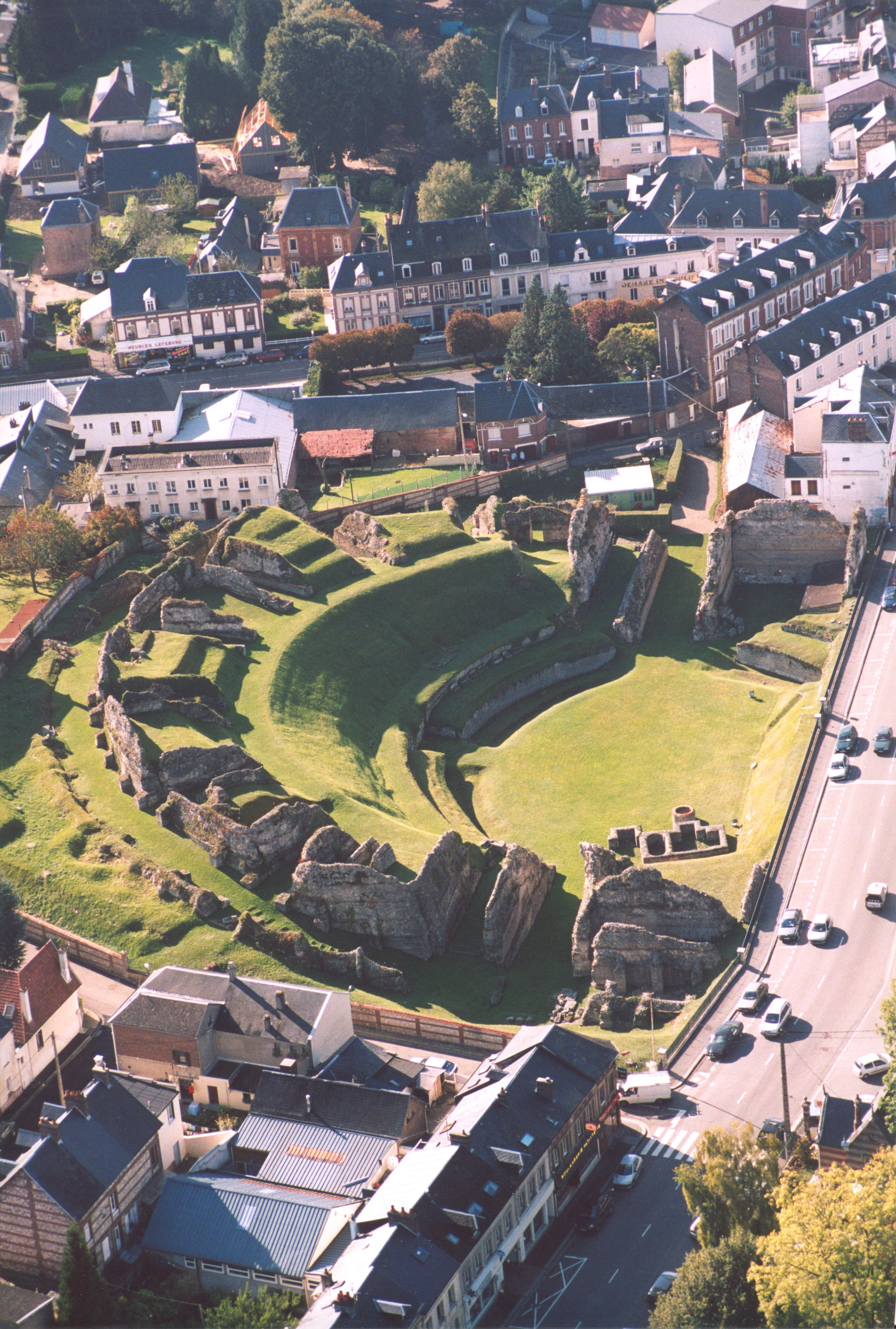
Aerial view of the site.

Plan of the successive construction phases.

Current research suggests the theatre underwent four successive construction phases between the 1st and 3rd centuries AD. This theatre could accommodate over 5,000 people and is notable for being a hybrid "theatre-amphitheater," combining an arena for animal hunts or gladiatorial combat with a stage for comedies and tragedies.

==== Phase 1 ====
The first theatre was small and built in a classic Roman style, but it was quickly replaced by a larger structure. The only known vestige is a wall inside the arena area, built in opus vittatum but leveled during later expansions.

In 1956, Albert Grenier proposed that the structure did not evolve from a classical theatre with an enlarged arena, but rather resulted from removing half of an amphitheater's cavea, leaving only the southern half.

==== Phases 2 and 3 ====
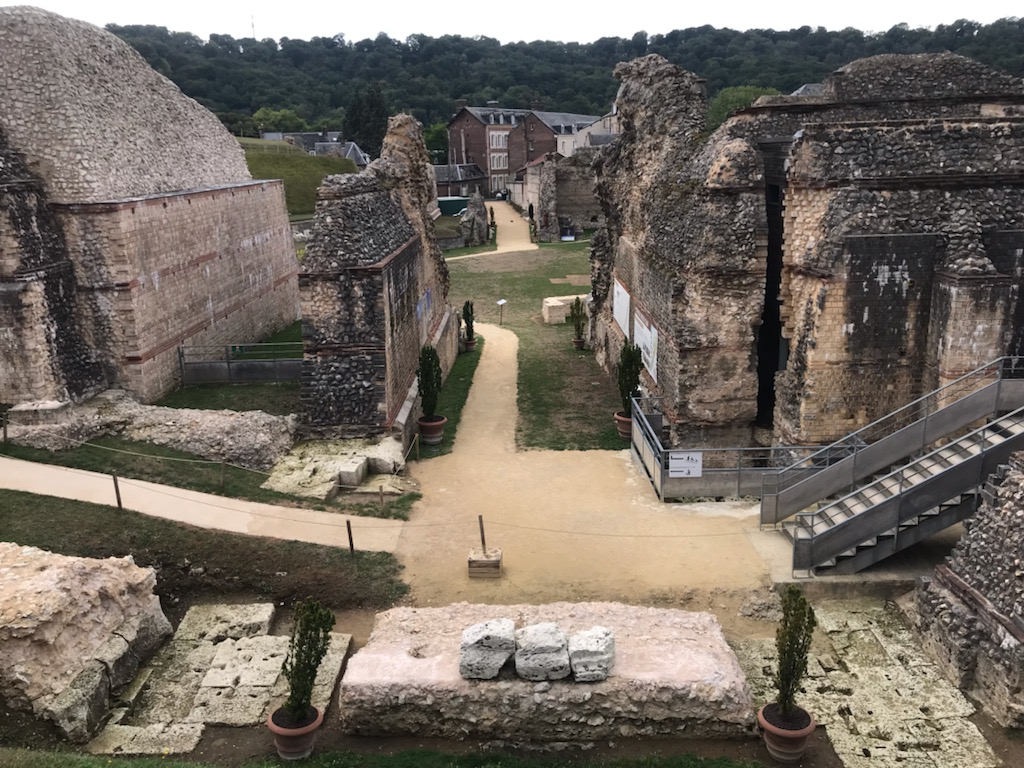
Masonry near one of the entrances to the cavea.

A hybrid "theatre-amphitheater" replaced the original building. The orchestra was significantly larger than in a standard theatre, allowing it to serve as an arena. However, a stage building was maintained. In the second phase, the cavea was rebuilt using a system of concentric and radiating walls, and the arena adopted an elliptical shape.

The third phase was characterized by an increase in capacity, achieved by constructing a peripheral gallery that supported additional rows of seating above it. The masonry from these phases consists of limestone (travertine) opus mixtum, featuring small stones interspersed with courses of brick. Brick was also used for the arches of the doors and the vaults of the vomitoria.

==== Phase 4 ====
During the late 3rd century, amidst the Germanic invasions, the theatre was abandoned as a place of entertainment and converted into a stronghold. Its structures were repurposed; most vomitoria and entrances were walled up to turn the theatre into a fortress. While the city was also fitted with a defensive wall at this time, it is unknown if the theatre was integrated into the city's main circuit or served as an advanced outpost. Baths were later constructed within the arena using repurposed blocks from funerary monuments.

== See also ==
- Juliobona
- List of Roman theatres
- Rotomagus
- Vindinum
- Roman Gaul
