= Music of Armenia (NGO) =

Organization about Armenian music

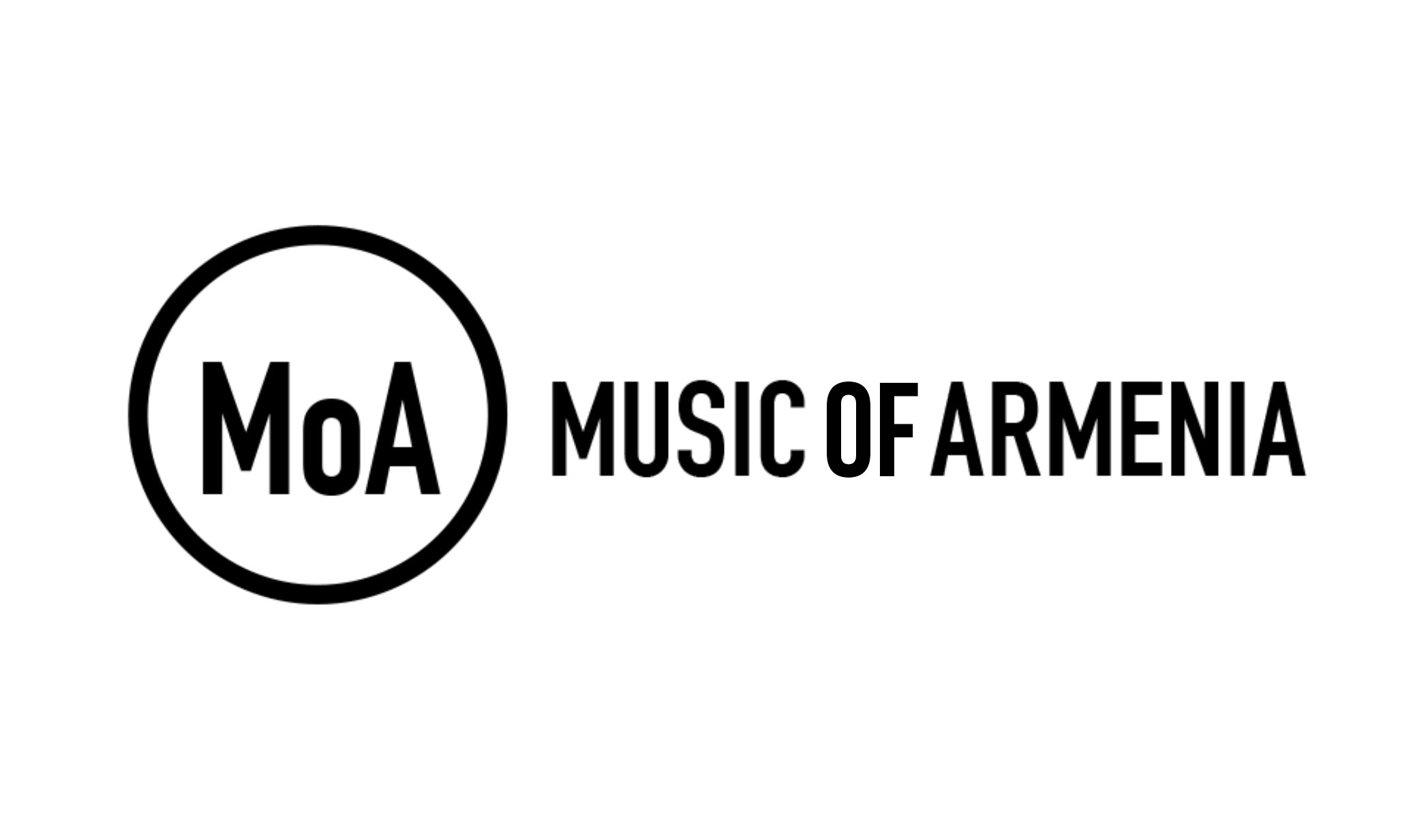
- The logo of Music of Armenia
- Creator: Hasmik Movsisian
- Website: musicofarmenia.com
- Launched: October 2008; 17 years ago
- Current status: Active

Music of Armenia is an organization established in October 2008 in the UK but is currently based in Armenia as an NGO. Its principal activities are online Armenian music and musician promotion, and artist, projects and events management. To date it has promoted a large number of Armenian musicians and created awareness about Armenian music and culture internationally. Its services are free for the musicians and the public (with the exception of some of its live events). As of 2015 it has been actively engaged in organizing music festivals.

It has promoted and worked with, both up and coming and established musicians, including: The Beautified Project, Garik Papoyan (head judge of X-Factor Armenia, Daniel Bedrosian (of George Clinton and Parliament Funkadelic), Vahagn Hayrapetian of the Armenian Navy Band, and Karine Poghosyan.

== History ==
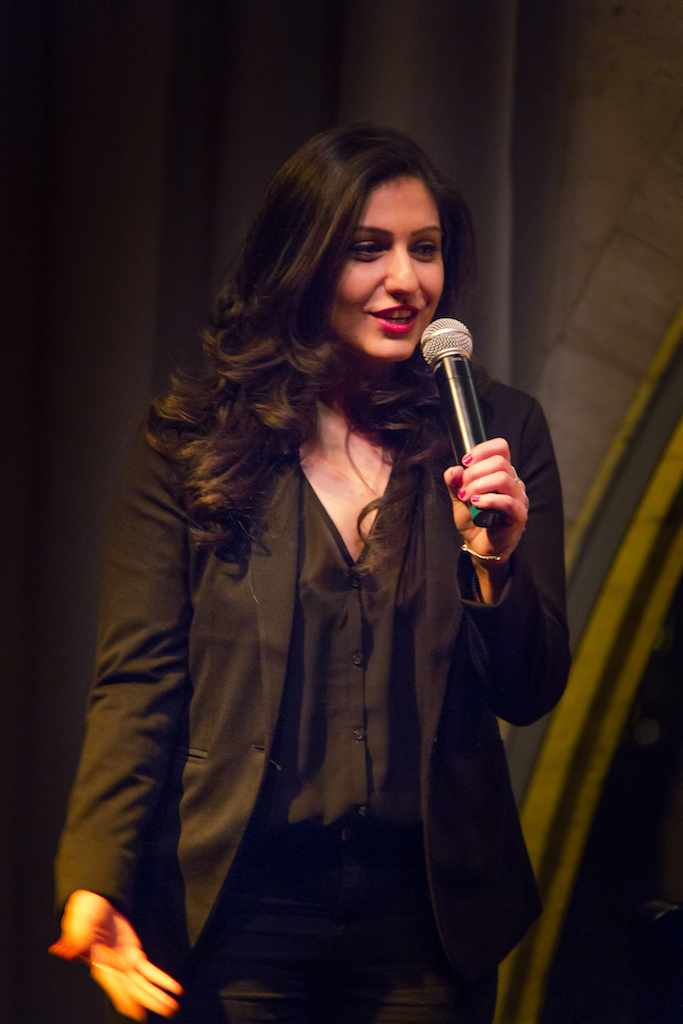
Hasmik Movsisian speaking during an MoA event.

In 2009, Music of Armenia provided the public relations on an international scale of Hay Superstar, the Armenian version of the British television hit show Pop Idol. In 2011, Music of Armenia hosted a radio show entitled ‘Colours of Armenia’ dedicated to Armenian music and culture on Resonance FM, and were the guest of BBC Radio show ‘A World In London’ on BBC London, which was entirely dedicated to Armenian music and culture.

In 2013, Music of Armenia was featured on The Guardian website, in the ‘Marketing and PR Excellence’ category, and it was nominated for the ‘Creative Business Cup’ by the British Council and Creative England. Music of Armenia marked its 5th anniversary on 17 October 2013 and to mark the occasion, it launched a brand new website as a gift to Armenian musicians and the lovers of Armenian music. In October 2013 Music of Armenia represented Armenia at WOMEX 13.

Between 2015 and 2016 Music of Armenia launched three separate music festivals revolving around different themes, the first was dedicated to duduk (Yerevan Duduk Festival), the second to Sayat Nova (Sayat Nova Festival) which took place in Yerevan and Tbilisi, the third called Sharakan Festival highlighted spiritual music and took place at the monastery of Tatev.

In 2017 Music of Armenia became the sole member of the International Music Council and the European Music Council representing Armenia. Both institutions were created by UNESCO as advisory bodies on matters of music. In 2018 Music of Armenia became the first Armenian member of International Music Managers Forum (IMMF). The same year it launched Women's Musical Month, a celebration focused on female creativity as well as the legacy of music created and performed by Armenian women.

During the 2018 Francophonie Summit which was held in Yerevan, Music of Armenia participated within its framework via Sounds of Sevan – a multidisciplinary installation/live performance art piece.
