= Frédéric Bednarz =

Canadian violinist

Frédéric Bednarz is a Canadian violinist. He received the Prix d'Europe in 1996. Bednarz was also a top prize laureate at international competitions in Italy.

== Early life and education ==
Bednarz studied with Oleh Krysa at the Eastman School of Music, Sergiu Schwartz at the Harid Conservatory and Victor Tretiakov in France.

== Career ==
Frédéric Bednarz is active as a soloist and chamber musician. His wide range of repertoire and his sensitive and keen musicianship have been praised by critics. As a soloist, he has played with l'Orchestre Métropolitain de Montreal, the Montreal Chamber Orchestra, the Montreal Youth Symphony Orchestra, La Sinfonia de Montréal, the Ottawa Chamber Orchestra, Ensemble America in New York, the Atlantic Symphony (MA). As a chamber musician, he performed with Anthony Marwood, Richard Lester, Julius Baker, Malcom Lowe, Alexandre Tharaud. He has premiered many new works by composers, such as R. Murray Schafer, Ana Sokolovic, Claude Marc Bourget. Bednarz has recorded for the XXI, Albany, Radio Canada, ATMA Classique, and Metis-Islands labels. He was a member of the Molinari String Quartet (2007-2018).

== Selective Discography ==
- Alfred Schnittke: String Quartets 1-4, Molinari Quartet, Atma Classique 2011
- Alfred Schnittke: String Trio, Quartet and Quintet with Piano, Atma Classique 2013
- Murray Schafer: Quartets 8-12, Molinari Quartet, Atma Classique 2013
- Shostakovich and Szymanowski: violin and piano sonatas, Natsuki Hiratsuka piano, Metis-Island 2014.
- Lekeu/Franck/Boulanger: violin and piano sonatas, Natsuki Hiratsuka piano, Metis-Island 2015.
- Krzysztof Penderecki Quatuor nos 1-3 et trio à cordes, Atma classique 2020
- Sofia Gubaidulina: Rejoice, Sonata for violin and cello, String Quartets 1-4, Molinari Quartet, Atma Classique 2015
- Petros Shoujounian: Noravank: String Quartets 3-6, Molinari Quartet, ATMA Classique 2016
- György Kurtág: Complete String Quartets, Molinari Quartet, Atma Classique 2016
- Giya Kancheli: Sunny Night, Natsuki Hiratsuka, piano, Jonathan Goldman, bandoneon, Metis-Island 2019
- https://atmaclassique.com/en/product/krzysztof-penderecki/
