= Antoine Bouchard =

Antoine Bouchard may refer to

- Antoine Bouchard (musician)
- Antoine Bouchard (judoka)
