= Fernande Chiocchio =

Canadian mezzo-sporano, pianist and teacher (1929-2021)

- Born: May 29, 1929; Montreal, Quebec, Canada
- Died: September 27, 2021 (aged 92); Saint-Leonard, Quebec, Canada
- Occupations: Mezzo-soprano; Pianist; Teacher
- Children: 1

Fernande Chiocchio (May 29, 1929 – September 27, 2021) was a Canadian mezzo-soprano, pianist and teacher. She performed numerous operatic roles on radio, stage and television across Canada and abroad. Chiocchio made her debut at Her Majesty's Theatre, London in 1952 and performed some 12 roles with the company as well as with Opéra de Québec, the Maurice Richard Arena and the Théâtre Graslin. She taught voice as a professor of music Conservatoire de musique de Hull between 1967 and 1978 and was the artistic director of the Opéra-Comique du Québec from 1984 to 1988. Chiocchio was an inductee of the Canadian Opera Hall of Fame.

== Early life and education ==
Chiocchio was born on May 29, 1929 in Montreal. She was of French-Italian descent; she was the daughter of the French-born Réjeanne Bastien and the Italian-born Michele Chiocchio. Chiocchio started to study the piano with the Sisters of Saint Anne at the age of 11, and later at the Lachine Superior School of Music, Lachine. She earned a Bachelor of Music degree in pianoforte from the piano class of the Université de Montréal in 1950, the same year she decided to go for a vocal career instead of being a pianist. In September 1950, Chiocchio got a singing scholarship at the École Supérieure de Musique de Lachine and scholarships from Archamabault and the Club Musical Social de Montreal in 1951. She studied voice under Pauline Donalda and Sister Rolande Ouimet from 1950 to 1955. Chiocchio also studied voice with Rachele Maragliano-Mori and Philon Ktsanes and stage skills with Jan Doat. Between 1966 and 1967, she studied at the Académie internationale d'été de Nice under Pierre Médecin and Iris Adami Corradetti on grants from the Canada Council.

== Career ==
She sung mezzo-soprano in English, French, German, Italian and Spanish, and performed numerous operatic roles on radio, stage and television in Quebec, Canada and elsewhere. During the 1947–1951 concert seasons, Chiocchio was a winner in the Singing Stars of Tomorrow radio series, performed on Mondays on the CBC Radio-Canada opera series, the Nos futures étoiles (Our Future Stars), the Sunday CBC French network program, and the Radio-Canada television series The Concert Hour (L'Heure du concert). In October 1951, she won first prize in the Prix du Club Social, and the Prix Archambault from the Ed. Archambault Company Inc. in January 1952.

Chiocchio performed at the Odeon Theatre, Sturgeon Falls in December 1951, at the Salle François Premier of the Château of Blois in October 1952, and at the Jean-Deslauriers Theatre in December 1956. She performed parts in Lakmé, Rigoletto and Franz Schubert's Chansons d'Amour and with Pierrette Alarie, Nelly Mathot and Léopold Simoneau, and under the direction of Emile Cooper, Sylvio Lacharite, Roland Leduc, Otto-Werner Mueller, Wilfrid Pelletier and Julius Rudel. From November to December 1956, Chiocchio performed 16th-century French songs with the Jeunesses Musicales de Trois-Rivières. In 1952, she made her debut at Her Majesty's Theatre, London in Sergei Prokofiev's The Love for Three Oranges with the Opera Guild of Montreal. Chiocchio went on to perform some 12 roles with the company, notably Mercédès in Georges Bizet's Carmen in 1960, Flora in Giuseppe Verdi's La traviata in 1962, Dame Marthe in Faust in 1963, Suzuki in Madama Butterfly in 1965 and 1969 and in Charles Gounod's Roméo et Juliette.

She was a member of a vocal quartet that conducted a 50-concert JM tour in France in 1958. In 1963, Chioccio co-founded the Trio vocal de Montréal with Josèphe Colle and George Morgan, performing primarily on CBC Radio. On CBC Television, Chiocchio appeared in Maurice Ravel's L'enfant et les sortilèges in 1957, and was Mère Jeanne in Dialogue of the Carmelites in 1960 and Bertha in The Barber of Seville in 1965, the latter role with the Canadian Opera Company in 1964 and the Vancouver Opera Association in 1965. She performed with the Opera Bouffe Company in 1962 and the Montreal Symphony Orchestra (MSO) in 1963, played Charlotte in Jules Massenet's Werther for the Montreal Festivals Society, the titular role in the La Boutique d'Opera's premiere performance of Gian Carlo Menotti's The Medium in 1963 and the debut performance of Ludwig van Beethoven's Symphony No. 9 at the Place des Arts in May 1964.

Choicchio was on a University recital concert tour of Canada under the auspices of the Canada Council, the Creative Arts Committee and Jeunesses Musicales Canada in late 1963, lasting for almost a month. She took part in the Canadian and Quebec premiere of Gilbert Bécaud's Opéra d'Aran in the part of Mara in Montreal in 1965, Manuel de Falla's Spanish ballet El amor brujo at the Maurice Richard Arena that same year, the Hommage à l'Espagne at Maurice Richard Arena as well as the Nice Summer Festival in Nice, France in 1966. Choicchio was awarded a Canada Council grant in 1968. Chioccio played the part of Emilia in Otello with the MSO at the Expo 67 World Festival. At the Opéra de Québec, she was the Mistress of the novices in Suor Angelica in 1971, Maddelena in Rigoletto in 1972 and reprised the role of Emilia in Otello in September 1973. Choicchio was the old maid in the l'Escale production of Menotti's The Old Maid and the Thief in 1974, before she relocated to France in 1978, appearing in Gustave Charpentier's Louise and Jacques Bondon's I-330 at the Théâtre Graslin.

She taught voice as a professor of music Conservatoire de musique de Hull from 1967 to 1978. After Choicchio returned to Montreal in 1982, she provided private education. Choicchio was the artistic director of the Opéra-Comique du Québec from 1984 to 1988.

== Personal life and death ==
She was married and had a son. Choicchio died in Saint-Leonard, Quebec on September 27, 2021.

== Recognition ==
She was inducted into the Canadian Opera Hall of Fame in 2006.
