= Josephte Dufresne =

Canadian pianist, conservatoire director

- Born: January 9, 1929; Trois-Rivières, Quebec, Canada
- Died: February 7, 1995 (aged 66); Saint-Hyacinthe, Quebec, Canada
- Occupation(s): Pianist, conservatoire director
- Known for: Promoting Canadian music
- Spouse: Jean-Yves Landry

Josephte Dufresne (1929–1995) was a Canadian pianist, teacher and conservatoire director.

== Life and work ==
Josephte Dufresne was born January 9, 1929, in Trois-Rivières, Quebec, Canada.

She studied piano in her birthplace and in Montreal with Jean-Marie Beaudet. After winning a Canadian study grant, the Prix d'Europe in 1950, she traveled to Paris and studied with composer Yves Nat. After returning to Montreal, she began to perform and teach.

Her passion was promoting the music of Canada and she did so as a recitalist and concert soloist on Société Radio-Canada (SRC) and CKAC radio and television. In 1967, she presented 13 half-hour recitals on SRC performing the work of about 60 Canadian composers. She also created her own works, such as her Pièce Concertante no. 1 for Canadian composer Jean Papineau-Couture and dedicating it to him.

Dufresne performed throughout Quebec, in New York State and in several cities in France, including Paris. She also accompanied other artists who went on tour. This was especially true of Canadian singer Claire Gagnier as well as other vocalists performing in televised opera productions.

In 1967, Dufresne was named a professor at the new Conservatoire de Musique du Québec à Hull, in Gatineau, Quebec when it welcomed its first 168 students from the Ottawa region. From 1972–1978, she was assistant director before becoming its director (1980–1984).

Starting in 1975 she began editing a work on Canadian music for piano. In 1987, she left teaching to devote herself to her music.

She died February 7, 1995, at age 66, in Saint-Hyacinthe, Quebec.

== Personal life ==
She married the director, orchestra conductor and television producer, Jean-Yves Landry in 1956, but later divorced.

== Discography ==
- Letondal, Champagne, G.-É. Tanguay, Lavallée, Contant, Renaud, Garant, Gagnon, Hétu: 1969; RCI 252, (Champagne) 4-ACM 30, (Hétu) 4-ACM 31 (CD).
- Matton Concerto for two pianos and percussion, Danse brésilienne for two pianos: J. Landry p, L. Charbonneau et Lachapelle perc; 1955; RCI 145 et 5-ACM 29.
- Papineau-Couture, Prévost, Mercure, Vallerand, Élie: Myette v, Millet fl; Allied ARCLP-4.
- Pépin, Morel, Mathieu, Tremblay, Garant, Papineau-Couture, Matton: 1955; RCI 135, (Pépin) 4-ACM 5, (Garant) 4-ACM 2, (Matton) 5-ACM 29.
