= Lucille Dompierre =

Canadian pianist and arranger

Lucille Dompierre (1899–1968) was a Canadian pianist and arranger. She made only a few recordings, mainly consisting of works by Frédéric Chopin. She also arranged several Canadian songs and folk tunes for piano and solo voice.

== Career ==
Dompierre was a pupil of Berthe Roy and Henri Gagnon. A child prodigy, she began her concert career at the age of five. In 1919 she won the prestigious Prix d'Europe. The award enabled her to continue studies in Paris, which she had begun in 1918, through 1920.

Upon her return to Quebec City in 1920, Dompierre continued her career as a concert pianist; appearing with every numerous important ensembles and at major venues throughout Canada. For many years she was the resident pianist of the Quebec Symphony Orchestra.
