= Jacqueline Martel =

Canadian soprano and music educator

Jacqueline Martel, also known by her married name Jacqueline Cistellini, (August 6, 1934 – April 30, 2017) was a Canadian soprano and music educator who had an active international career in operas and concerts in the 1960s and 1970s. She won the Prix Archambault in 1957 and the Prix d'Europe in 1960. After retiring from performance, she had a lengthy career as a voice teacher; teaching primarily at the Conservatoire de musique du Québec à Québec where she was a professor of voice from 1980 until her retirement in 2011.

== Life and career ==
Born in Quebec City, Jacqueline Martel began her music studies in piano at the age of six at the Mallet Convent in her native city. In 1952 she began studies at the Conservatoire de musique du Québec à Montréal (CMQQ); initially as a piano student. In 1955 she began vocal training at the CMQQ with soprano Ria Lenssens, and after two years under her training she won the voice division of the Prix Archambault in 1957. From 1959 to 1961 she studied singing under Dina Maria Narici at the Conservatoire de musique du Québec à Montréal.

After winning the Prix d'Europe in 1960, Martel used the prize to pursue further voice training in Italy with Maria-Teresa Pediconi and in piano with Giorgio Favaretto at the Accademia Nazionale di Santa Cecilia in Rome from 1961-1964. While there, she made her professional opera debut at the Teatro dell'Opera di Roma as Laetitia in Gian Carlo Menotti's The Old Maid and the Thief. She appeared as a leading soprano at opera houses in Italy, France, Switzerland, and Canada in the 1960s and 1970s. Her repertoire included the role of Rosina in Rossini's The Barber of Seville and the title role in Jules Massenet's Manon among other parts. She also performed the world premieres of two works by Virgilio Mortari.

Martel joined the voice faculty of the Conservatoire de musique du Québec à Trois-Rivières in 1974, and in 1980 she began teaching as a part of the voice faculty at the Conservatoire de musique du Québec à Québec. She retired from her position at the latter school in 2011.

In 1966 Martel married the Italian businessman Ennio Cistellini. She died on April 30, 2017.

== Leading roles ==
- 1963 : The Barber of Seville
- 1964 : Les Pêcheurs de perles
- 1965 : Mireille
- 1967 : La Bohème
- 1969 : Les Pêcheurs de perles
