= Yves Prin =

French composer and conductor

Yves Prin (born 3 June 1933) is a French composer and conductor of classical music.

== Life ==
Prin was born on 3 June 1933 in Sainte-Savine. He studied piano with Yves Nat and conducting with Louis Fourestier at the Conservatoire National Supérieur de Musique de Paris where he won several first prizes.

He started his career as a pianist, but upon meeting Bruno Maderna (assistant at the Mozarteum, Salzburg from 1968 to 1969), decided to turn towards conducting. This association with the Italian maestro was the reason for his final decision to dedicate his work mostly to contemporary music.

Prin was subsequently guest conductor of the orchestras of the Residentie (The Hague) and of Haarlem in the Netherlands (1968–1973), then music director of the Orchestre Philharmonique des Pays de la Loire (1970–1974), of the Atelier Lyrique du Rhin (1974–1980) and of the Nouvel Orchestre Philharmonique de Radio France (1981–1982). He worked at Ircam of Pierre Boulez in Paris for the composer's cursus in 1978. He has recorded more than a dozen records (Etcetera, REM, Adès, Salabert Actuel, MFA, Accord) and conducted many pieces by composers from all over the world: from Claudio Monteverdi, Wolfgang Amadeus Mozart, Franz Schubert, Maurice Ravel, Claude Debussy, to Iannis Xenakis, Mauricio Kagel, Luciano Berio, Karlheinz Stockhausen, Bruno Maderna. He has premiered operas by Georges Aperghis, François-Bernard Mâche, Ahmed Essyad, Michaël Levinas, Paul Méfano, Philippe Hersant, Henri Pousseur, Maurice Ohana, Claude Prey, André Boucourechliev and has led revivals of many others.

He was in charge of coordination for contemporary music and music theater for Radio France from 1983 to 1986. From 1983 to 1999 he was the producer at Radio France for the contemporary music concert series <Musique au Présent>, <Musiques en Perspectives> and <Musique du XXe Siècle>. In addition, from 1992 to 1999, he was acting producer of Radio France's Festival <Présences>, which features first performances.

Prin pursues a parallel career as composer (published in particular by Editions Durand). He developed his own dramatic language and has a special lyrical vision of music. His catalogue includes today forty works including 5 concertos and 41 melodies divided into several cycles. Since 1999 Prin has dedicated himself to his own music and to his performing activities as a pianist and a conductor.

He has received the Prix Florent-Schmitt de l'Académie des Beaux-Arts (1997).

== Works ==
=== Orchestral ===
- Actions-Simultanées II (1972)

=== Concertante ===
- Concerto Grosso for Flute, Violin, Clarinet, and Chamber Orchestra Dioscures (1977, rev. 1984)
- Capriccio for Violin and Chamber Orchestra Éphémères (1973, rev. 1992)
- Flute Concerto Le Souffle d'Iris (1986, rev. 1992)
- Tuba Concerto (1993)
- Piano Concerto In Praise of Flight (1997, rev. 2000)

=== Chamber/Instrumental ===
- Concerto for Percussion and Brass (1970)
- Actions-Simultanées I (1972)
- String Quartet La Barque (1992)

== Sources ==
- American Record Guide (March 2002). "Guide to Records: Dioscures; Ephemeres; Souffle d'Iris"
- Tommasini, Anthony. "Composer From Paris, A Premiere In the Rain". New York Times (July 15, 1996)
