= Jacques Hétu =

Canadian composer (1938–2010)

- Born: August 8, 1938; Trois-Rivières, Quebec
- Died: February 9, 2010 (aged 71); Saint-Hippolyte, Quebec
- Occupations: Composer, teacher
- Awards: Royal Society of Canada; Order of Canada; National Order of Quebec

Jacques Joseph Robert Hétu OC OQ FRSC (August 8, 1938 – February 9, 2010) was a prominent Canadian composer and music educator. Hétu is the most frequently performed of Canadian classical composers, both within Canada and internationally.

== Education ==
Jacques Hétu was born in Trois-Rivières, Quebec; he began his professional training at the University of Ottawa where he was a pupil of Father Jules Martel from 1955 to 1956. In 1956 he entered the Conservatoire de musique du Québec à Montréal and studied there for five years with Melvin Berman (oboe), Isabelle Delorme (harmony), Jean Papineau-Couture (fugue), Clermont Pépin (composition and counterpoint), and Georges Savaria (piano); he also studied at the Tanglewood Music Center during the summer of 1959 with Lukas Foss.

In 1961 he won several important awards, including the first prize at the Quebec Music Festivals composition competition, a grant from the Canada Council, and the Prix d'Europe. The latter two awards enabled him to pursue studies in France at the École Normale de Musique de Paris from 1961 to 1963 with Henri Dutilleux and at the Paris Conservatory with Olivier Messiaen in 1962–1963. Dutilleux encouraged Hétu to pursue his own style in composition and not be influenced strongly by current trends.

== Teaching ==
Hétu joined the music faculty at Laval University in 1963, remaining there through 1977. He taught music composition at the University of Montreal in 1972–1973 and 1978–1979. From 1979 to 2000, he was a professor at the Université du Québec à Montréal, notably serving as the director of that school's Music Department from 1980 to 1982 and from 1986 to 1988.

== Compositions ==
Hétu is the most frequently performed Canadian classical composer, well known for his five symphonies, each of which was enthusiastically received by initial audiences and critics.

His Variations for Piano, Op. 8, composed in 1964, display his serial-atonal style. The work was recorded by Glenn Gould in 1967 as a project for the Canadian Centennial. Canadian pianist Ronald Turini performed the Variations on tour in 1967. With these performances of the Variations by Canada's two most acclaimed pianists, Hétu's name vaulted to the fore of Canadian classical music, and the composer was soon inundated with commissions for new works. Demand for his music would remain strong for the rest of his life.

Hétu's Third Symphony (1971) marked a turn in direction for his compositional technique toward a more tonal and traditional style. This work became an important success and was featured in world tours by the Canadian National Arts Centre Orchestra of Ottawa.

In 1985 he composed Missa pro trecentesimo anno, a large-scale choral setting of the Roman Catholic Mass to celebrate the 300th anniversary of Bach's birth. The work was commissioned by the Canadian Broadcasting Corporation and premiered on the CBC radio network.

Hétu's Trumpet Concerto (1987), commissioned for and premiered by a Canadian soloist, was first played in the U.S. in 1992 by the New York Philharmonic under Kurt Masur, with the orchestra's Philip Smith as soloist, boosting Hétu's international profile.

His Organ Concerto (2000) was premiered by Rachel Laurin with the Edmonton Symphony Orchestra conducted by Mario Bernardi in 2002.

Hétu's Concerto for Two Guitars, composed in 2007, was premiered by Marc Deschennes and André Roi with the Orchestre Métropolitain conducted by Yannick Nézet-Séguin.

Also in 2007 Hétu composed Légendes, his Op. 76, for orchestra, an evocation of three Québec legends that reflects French-Canadian folk-music influences.

On 3 March 2010 the Toronto Symphony Orchestra premiered the Fifth Symphony under the baton of its music director, Peter Oundjian. It is not known whether this commission, Hétu's Op. 81, was his last completed work. The final choral movement of what is a large-scale score sets the “underground” poem by Paul Éluard, Liberté, which had circulated during the French Resistance in the 1940s. World War II in France is indeed the subject of the symphony as a whole, as the quasi-programmatic titles of its four movements indicate: Prologue, L'Invasion, L'Occupation, Liberté.

== Compositional style ==
Although Hétu studied in Paris with Dutilleux and Messiaen, he eventually reverted to include a tonal core to his compositional technique, and decided against following Pierre Boulez into serialism or atonality. Dutilleux encouraged Hétu to pursue his own style in composition and not be influenced strongly by current trends. Hétu's Third Symphony of 1971 marked his firm return to tonal forms of music composition.

The influence of such twentieth century composers as Darius Milhaud and Béla Bartók are discernible in his work, and folk music sources and polytonality featured in his musical language. Hétu often composed in larger symphonic forms, especially symphonies, concertos, and tone poems, where the stylistic impact of late nineteenth century French composers ranging from César Franck and Ernest Chausson to Claude Debussy was apparent. These larger movements required tonal organizing principles to provide structural coherence.

Hétu's abandonment of serialism and atonality and his return to more historical musical traditions caused considerable resentment against him from the avant-garde proponents of modernism. His response was instructive for the musical community, "I handled the ostracism thanks to performers who played my music or commissioned works from me."

In 1988, a four-CD set of Hétu's music was included in the Anthology of Canadian Music Series. The Hétu portrait in the Canadian Composers Portraits series was released in 2002.

== Honours ==
Hétu was nominated for a 1989 Juno Award in the Best Classical Composition category.

In 1989, he was made a Fellow of the Royal Society of Canada.

In 2001 he was made an Officer of the Order of Canada.

== Death ==
Hétu died of lung cancer at his home in Saint-Hippolyte on February 9, 2010. He was survived by his wife, Jeanne Desaulniers, and five children.
