= Prix d'Europe =

Canadian study grant for music

The Prix d'Europe (French pronunciation: [pʁi døʁɔp]) is a Canadian study grant that is funded by the Ministère des Affaires culturelles du Québec of the Government of Quebec. Established in 1911, the award has been distributed annually to a single individual through competition with the exception of 1960-1973 and 2009 when there was a potential for 2 prizes each year and 1971 when no prize was given. Winners of the grant are given a cash prize towards furthering their musical education abroad in Europe. Past winners of the prize include a large number of notable Canadian musicians.

== History ==
J.-Arthur Paquet, a Quebecois businessman and organist who was treasurer of the Académie de musique du Québec, was responsible for spearheading the grant's creation in 1911. Paquet gained the support of the academy's board and its secretary, Joseph-Arthur Bernier, and a plan by the school for the project was brought to Quebec premier Sir Lomer Gouin for his personal approval. Gouin supported the project and through his influence the National Assembly of Quebec passed a law promoting the development of musical art on 24 March 1911 which included funding the Prix d'Europe.

The Prix d'Europe initially awarded a cash prize of $3000 in 1911, at that time a very large sum of money. The sum was raised in 1959 ($5000), 1973 ($8000), and (1988). For more than the first 40 years of their history individual participants competed in their respective categories for a single prize. In 1960 two prizes were established: a prize for a keyboardist or vocalist, and a prize for an orchestral instrumentalist or composer. Some years only one prize was given when the judges deemed there was not a suitable winner in a particular category. In 1974 the competition returned to its original state of offering just a single prize. In 2009 two prizes were given.

On two occasions the Prix d'Europe awarded special grants to individuals: in 1924 to violinist Norman Herschorn and in 1926 to pianist Alice Ste-Marie. The 1938 winner of the competition, Marcel Hébert, drowned before he could avail himself of the grant awarded to him. Accordingly, his grant was distributed to two other participants in that year's competition: Noël Brunet and Georges Savaria. No prize was given in 1971 as the judges felt that no applicant had demonstrated a sufficient level of skill to have earned the prize.

== Winners ==
=== 1911-1959 ===
1911 Clotilde Coulombe, piano

1912 Léo-Pol Morin, piano

1913 Omer Létourneau, organ

1914 Jean Dansereau, piano

1915 Wilfrid Pelletier, piano

1916 Graziella Dumaine, voice

1917 Germaine Malépart, piano

1918 Jean Kaster, cello

1919 Lucille Dompierre, piano

1920 Ruth Pryce, violin

1921 Auguste Descarries, piano

1922 Anna-Marie Messénie, piano

1923 Conrad Bernier, organ

1924 Gabriel Cusson, cello

1925 Paul Doyon, piano

1926 Lionel Daunais, voice

1927 Rita Savard, piano; Henri Mercure, composition

1928 Brahm Sand, cello

1929 Jean-Marie Beaudet, organ

1930 Gilberte Martin, piano

1931 Lucien Martin, violin

1932 Bernard Piché, organ

1933 Edwin Bélanger, violin

1934 Georges Lindsay, organ

1935 Georgette Tremblay, organ

1936 Noël Brunet, violin

1937 Georges Savaria, piano

1938 Marcel Hébert, piano

1939 Paule-Aimée Bailly, piano

1940 Suzette Forgues, cello

1941 Marcelle Martin, organ

1942 Claude Lavoie, organ

1943 Berthe Dorval, piano

1944 Jacqueline Lavoy, piano

1945 Claude Létourneau, violin

1946 Jeanne Landry, piano

1947 Lise DesRosiers, piano

1948 Raymond Daveluy, organ

1949 Clermont Pépin, piano

1950 Josephte Dufresne, piano

1951 Anna-Marie Globenski, piano

1952 Janine Lachance, piano

1953 Kenneth Gilbert, organ

1954 Monik Grenier, piano

1955 Léon Bernier, piano

1956 Monique Munger, piano

1957 Jean Leduc, organ

1958 Lise Boucher, piano

1959 Rachel Martel, piano

=== 1960-1973 ===
1960 Jacqueline Martel, voice; Gisèle Daoust, piano

1961 Jacques Hétu, composition; Pierre Ménard, violin

1962 Colette Boky, voice; John McKay, piano

1963 Cécile Lanneville, cello; André Prévost, composition

1964 Claude Ouellet, voice; Claude Savard, piano

1965 Alain Gagnon, composition

1966 Monique Gendron, organ; Bruno Laplante, voice

1967 Micheline Coulombe Saint-Marcoux, composition; Jacques Larocque, saxophone

1968 Roland Richard, voice; Lucie Madden, organ

1969 Louise LeComte, recorder

1970 John Whitelaw, harpsichord

1971 not awarded

1972 Marie Laferrière, voice; Karen Quinton, piano

1973 Raynald Arseneault, composition; Marcel Saint-Jacques, flute

=== 1974–present ===
1974 Jacinthe Couture, piano

1975 Denis Bédard, harpsichord

1976 Robert Langevin, flute

1977 Michel Franck, piano

1978 Gilles Carpentier, clarinet

1979 Chantal Juillet, violin

1980 Marie-Danielle Parent, voice

1981 Jacques Després, piano

1982 Johanne Perron, cello

1983 Sophie Rolland, cello

1984 Violaine Melançon, violin

1985 Éric Trudel, piano

1986 Jean Saulnier, piano

1987 Philippe Magnan, oboe

1988 Brigitte Rolland, violin

1989 Claude Labelle, piano

1990 Marie-Claude Bilodeau, piano

1991 Stéphane Rancourt, oboe

1992 Guylaine Flamand, piano

1993 Pascale Giguère, violin

1994 Mark Freiheit, piano

1995 Stéphan Sylvestre, piano

1996 Frédéric Bednarz, violin

1997 Olivier Thouin, violin

1998 Mariane Patenaude, piano

1999 Benoit Loiselle, cello

2000 Catherine Meunier, percussion

2001 Manelli Pirzadeh, piano

2002 Vincent Boucher, organ

2003 Wonny Song, piano

2004 Anne-Julie Caron, percussion

2005 Jocelyne Roy, flute

2006 Jean-Sébastien Roy, violin

2007 Caroline Chéhadé, violin

2008 Valérie Milot, harp

2009 Marie-Eve Poupart, violin and Maxime McKinley, composition

2010 Tristan Longval-Gagné, piano

2011 Charles Richard-Hamelin, piano and Gabriel Dharmoo, composition

2012 Victor Fournelle-Blain, violin

2013 Ariane Brisson, flute

2014 Bénédicte Lauzière, violin

2015 Xiaoyu Liu, piano

2016 David Dias da Silva, clarinet

2017 Felix Hong, piano

2018 Dominique Beauséjour-Ostiguy, cello

2019 Samuel Blanchette-Gagnon, piano

2021 Carole-Anne Roussel, voice

2022 Wilhelm Magner, viola

2023 Elisabeth St-Gelais, voice

2024 Dabin Zoey Yang, violin

2025 Samuel Lauzon-Schnittka, piano
