= Maurice Bourgue =

French oboist, composer and conductor (1939–2023)

- Bourgue c. 1990
- Born: 6 November 1939; Avignon, France
- Died: 6 October 2023 (aged 83); Avignon, France
- Education: Conservatoire de Paris
- Occupations: Oboist; Conductor; Academic teacher
- Organizations: Orchestre de Paris; Mozarteum; Conservatoire de Paris; Geneva Conservatoire

Maurice Bourgue (French: [buʁɡ]) (6 November 1939 – 6 October 2023) was a French oboist, composer, conductor, and academic teacher who made an international career. He was principal oboist with the Orchestre de Paris from its foundation in 1967 until 1979. He founded a wind octet of members of the orchestra in 1972, for performing and recordings. He taught chamber music at the Conservatoire de Paris and the Geneva Conservatoire. Bourgue played in world premieres, such as Les Citations by Henri Dutilleux in 1991.

== Life and career ==
Bourgue was born in Avignon on 6 November 1939. His father was an amateur clarinetist, which had helped him to special treatment when he was a prisoner of war in Germany. He wanted to achieve similar chances for his son, and assigned him to lessons in music theory from age seven, and let him choose an instrument two years later. The boy heard oboe music on radio and liked its "solar radiance". He began to learn the instruments, and soon could play alongside his father in local groups, sometimes accompanying Camargue dancers. He was invited to play in Bach's Magnificat, and then considered to play professionally.

He studied at the Conservatoire de Paris in the oboe class of Étienne Baudo, and chamber music with Fernand Oubradous. He achieved a First Prize for oboe in 1958 and a First Prize for chamber music in 1959. Military service took him to Algiers where he was able to play in the radio orchestra regularly.

Bourgue then won first prize at the Geneva International Music Competition in 1963. He impressed the English public, having won the Birmingham Symphony Orchestra International Wind Competition in 1965, and having premiered Malcolm Arnold's Fantasy for Oboe. He also won the ARD International Music Competition in Munich (1967), Prague Spring International Music Festival (1968), and Budapest (1970).

He played solo cor anglais in the Société des Concerts du Conservatoire. When the Orchestre de Paris was founded in 1967, chief conductor Charles Munch called him to be principal oboist, and he remained in the position until 1979. In parallel, he performed as a soloist with conductors such as Claudio Abbado, Daniel Barenboim, Riccardo Chailly, and John Eliot Gardiner, with orchestras including the Berlin Philharmonic, the London Symphony Orchestra, the New York Philharmonic, and the Tokyo Symphony Orchestra.

From 1972, he devoted an important part of his activities to chamber music with a wind octet bearing his name, founded as an ensemble of players from the Orchestre de Paris. They made several recordings, exploring scores such as Gounod's Petite Symphonie. They also recorded Mozart's Serenade No. 10.

He played chamber music with friends in a concert at the 92nd Street Y in New York City in 2009, playing first "La Françoise" from Couperin's Les Nations suites, with violinist Jaime Laredo, and then Poulenc's Oboe Sonata with pianist Mitsuko Uchida, and a reviewer from The New York Times described his playing in the "paradoxical mix of the elegiac, the suave and the clever" as "bold, elegant and incisive".

Bourgue played in world premieres of works by Luciano Berio. He had recorded the 1947 Oboe Sonata by Henri Dutilleux against the composer's wishes, but Dutilleux let him play in the world premiere of Les Citations in 1991, and even in 2010 the premiere of the sonata's definitive version, his last completed score. He made many recordings, some of which won awards.

=== Teaching ===
Bourgue was appointed professor of chamber music at the Paris Conservatoire in 1979. He taught the oboe class at the Conservatoire de Paris from 1986, and then at the Geneva Conservatoire from 1992 to 2011. He also served as music director of the Sándor Végh Institute for Chamber Music of the Mozarteum in Salzburg. He held masterclasses in Budapest, London, Lausanne, Moscow, Oslo, Jerusalem, and Kyoto. Bourgue taught breathing techniques inspired by those of singers.

=== Personal life ===
Maurice Bourgue died in Avignon on 6 October 2023, at age 83.

== Recordings ==
Besides ensemble recordings, Bourgue recorded as a chamber musician works from Baroque to contemporary, Baroque music by Albinoni, Bach and Vivaldi, and 20th century music such as Poulenc's and Dutilleux' Oboe Sonatas, and Britten's Metamorphoses. He took part in Poulenc's Sonata, Trio for Oboe, Bassoon and Piano, and Sextet for Piano and Wind Quintet in a collection of the composer's chamber music, with pianist Pascal Rogé; a reviewer from Gramophone noted in 1989:

Maurice Bourgue's is a lovely performance which most touchingly suggests Poulenc's sorrow at the death of Prokofiev. His tone is delicate and sweet, with the subtlest of gradations, and the volatility of the outer parts of the scherzo is admirably contrasted with his expressiveness in the lyrical central section.
