= Henri Gagnon =

Canadian composer, organist and music educator

Henri Gagnon (French pronunciation: [ɑ̃ʁi ɡaɲɔ̃]; 6 March 1887 – 17 May 1961) was a Canadian composer, organist, and music educator. He spent 51 years playing the organ at the Notre-Dame Basilica-Cathedral of Quebec City where, according to music historian François Brassard, he earned "a prestige similar to that of the famous organists of Europe." He was a much-admired teacher and taught at several institutions, notably succeeding Wilfrid Pelletier as the second director of the Conservatoire de musique du Québec à Québec. As a composer, he produced mainly works for solo organ and piano; although he did write a few choral works and vocal pieces as well. One of his more popular works was Rondel de Thibaut de Champagne which Edward Johnson and Rodolphe Plamondon often performed in their recitals. Two of his works, Mazurka (1907) and Deux Antiennes, were recorded by the CBC Montreal Orchestra.

== Early life and education ==
Born in Quebec City, Gagnon was from a prominent family of musicians in Canada. Both his father, Gustave Gagnon, and his uncle, Ernest Gagnon, were prominent organists and composers in Quebec City. He began studying solfège and piano with his father at the age of eight and he remained his principal teacher until he was thirteen. From 1900 to 1903 he was a pupil of William Reed (organ) and Joseph Vézina (solfège and harmony). He began performing publicly as a child and had his first major success at the Pan-American Exposition in 1901. The Buffalo Courier-Express called him "a true prodigy" in their review of his concert.

In 1903 Gagnon moved to Montreal to continue his musical education. He remained there through 1907, studying with such teachers as Guillaume Couture (harmony and counterpoint), Father Charles-Hugues Lefebvre (church music), Arthur Letondal (piano), Romain-Octave Pelletier I (organ), and Romain Pelletier (organ). From 1903 to 1906 he was chapel organist at Gesù College and then served in the same capacity at Loyola College in 1906–1907. In 1906 he earned a certificate from the Dominion College of Music.

== Studies in France ==
In 1907 Gagnon left Canada for Paris where he spent the next three and half years. In France he studied with Amédée Gastoué (plainchant), Eugène Gigout (organ, plainchant, improvisation, and harmony), Isidor Philipp (piano), and Charles-Marie Widor (organ). In 1908 and 1909 he was a soloist in the Concerts Touche, and he also filled in for Gigout occasionally as organist at the Église Saint-Augustin de Paris. He later returned to Paris in the summers of 1911, 1912, 1914, and 1924 to continue studies with Widor and with Joseph Bonnet.

== Career in Canada ==
In 1910 Gagnon returned to his native city to assume the post of assistant organist at the Notre-Dame Basilica-Cathedral in Quebec City. He was promoted to organist at the church in 1915, a position he held until his death in Quebec City in 1961. A much sought after teacher, he taught at both the École normale Laval and at the Petit Séminaire de Québec from 1917 to 1933. In 1923 he joined the faculty of Université Laval where he taught for roughly two decades. He was also director of the Académie de musique du Québec from 1929 to 1932 and the second director of the Conservatoire de musique du Québec à Québec from 1946 to 1961. His notable students included Jean-Marie Beaudet, Françoys Bernier, Maurice Bernier, Marius Cayouette, Father Léon Destroismaisons, Lucille Dompierre, Alice Duchesnay, Claude Lagacé, and Léo-Pol Morin.

== Legacy ==
In 1958 the National Film Board of Canada made a 30-minute documentary, Henri Gagnon, organiste, profiling his life and career. In 1974 the recording Hommage à Henri Gagnon was made which included works composed by Gagnon and works with which he was known for playing. Organists on the recording included Antoine Bouchard, Sylvain Doyon, Claude Lagacé, and Antoine Reboulot. Reboulot notably plays his own work, Variations sur le nom d'Henri Gagnon, on the recording. In 1987 the publishing company Les Éditions Jacques Ostiguy Inc commemorated his 100th birthday by publishing a collection of seven organ works dedicated to Gagnon by six different composers entitled Le Tombeau de Henri Gagnon.
