= Rosette Renshaw =

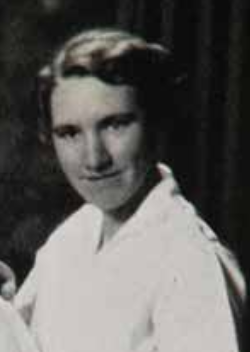
- Renshaw, from the 1940 yearbook of McGill University
- Born: 4 May 1920
- Died: 13 March 1997 (aged 76)
- Occupations: Composer, ethnomusicologist

Rosette Madelaine Renshaw (4 May 1920 – 13 March 1997) was a Canadian composer, ethnomusicologist, music educator, pianist and translator. She studied music from India, Japan, and South Asia, and worked as a translator for Canada's House of Commons and Secretary of State.

== Early life and education ==
Renshaw was born in Montreal. She studied at the Ecole Vincent-d’Indy, then earned a B.A. from McGill University and a doctorate from Toronto University. She also studied at the Peabody Conservatory and the Paris Conservatory. Her teachers included Nadia Boulanger, Claude Champagne, Nicolas Nabokov, and Dr. Alfred Whitehead.

== Career ==
Renshaw began working as one of the first women translators in the Ottawa House of Commons in 1943, also serving later as a translator for the Secretary of State. Her teaching career included time at:

- 1956–57 Ecole Vincent-d’Indy
- 1959–64 University of Montreal
- 1960s McGill University
- 1967–(1990?) State University of New York (New Paltz, NY).

In England, Renshaw lectured at the Bath International Music Festival, the Yehudi Menuhin School, and the Royal Conservatory of Music. She received a UNESCO grant to study in India, and made annual visits there towards the end of her life. In 1957, Renshaw provided commentary for a Ravi Shankar concert presented on CBC TV. During her tenure at SUNY, she arranged concerts there by Indian musicians such as Ali Akbar Khan, Amir Khan, and Ravi Shankar. She also produced video tapes on the music of South Asia and Japan.

Renshaw's library was donated to the University of Ottawa Library. Her works included:

== Music ==
- Madrigal for Strings
- Symphony in G

== Writing ==
- Erik Satie (1866–1925) La Nouvelle Revue Canadienne 1/2 1951 avril-mai 1951 [pp] 76-80
- “Rhythmic Structures in Indian and Western Music” in R. Ashton, ed., Music East and West New Delhi 1966
