= Georges Savaria =

Canadian pianist and composer (1916–1998)

Georges Savaria (27 March 1916 – 1998) was a Canadian pianist, composer, ondist, college administrator and music educator. His compositional output consists of a 1951 piano concerto, several songs and works for solo piano, and music for theatre, television, and radio. Some of his music was published by the periodical Le Passe-Temps.

== Early life and education ==
Born in Montreal, Savaria is the son of organist Joseph-Élie Savaria with whom he studied the organ and piano. He also studied music theory in his native city with Claude Champagne. After winning the Prix d'Europe for piano in 1937, he studied in Paris at the Schola Cantorum with Daniel Lesur (counterpoint) and Olivier Messiaen (organ). He also studied privately in that city with Louis Aubert (music theory), Lazare Lévy (piano), Marguerite Long (piano), and Pierre Lucas (piano). During World War II he was interned in a Nazi concentration camp near Paris, but managed to escape and return to Canada in 1943. In 1980 he published a book, Hors de portée, which give a descriptive account of these events.

== Career ==
After returning home, Savaria performed actively as recitalist and on Canadian radio and television in Quebec province from 1943 to 1956. He performed on a number of occasions with the Quebec Symphony Orchestra, notably playing Robert Schumann's Piano Concerto with the orchestra in 1944 and 1947. He also appeared in concerts with the Montreal Symphony Orchestra in 1948. He studied the ondes Martenot with that instrument's inventor, Maurice Martenot, in 1959–1960. He played that instrument for several plays by William Shakespeare at the 1959 Stratford Festival and with the CBC Symphony Orchestra in the 1960 world premiere of Claude Champagne's Altitude.

In 1953 Savaria began working for the Canadian Broadcasting Corporation as a music consultant and producer; positions he held through 1964. He also composed music for numerous CBC Television dramas, including Federico García Lorca's Yerma and The House of Bernarda Alba, and for several 1963 documentaries made by Radiodiffusion-Télévision Française. In 1970 he worked as a composer for Radio-Québec. He contributed music to theatrical productions mounted by the Nouvelle Compagnie Théâtrale, the Théâtre de l'Égrégoire, and Les Grands Ballets Canadiens.

As a teacher, Savaria worked for a number of educational institutions in addition to giving private instruction. He taught briefly at the Conservatoire de musique du Québec à Montréal in 1952, and later rejoined that faculty on a permanent basis in 1965. He left there in 1976 to join the faculty of the Conservatoire de musique du Québec à Trois-Rivières. He served as that school's director from 1978 to 1980. He also was involved with the music program in the Mauricie public school district. Among his notable pupils are Albert Grenier and Jacques Hétu. Savaria died in 1998.
