= Étienne Baudo =

French oboist (1903–2001)

- Born: 28 February 1903; Marseille, France
- Died: 30 May 2001 (aged 98); Marseille, France
- Education: Conservatoire de Marseille; Conservatoire de Paris
- Occupations: Oboist; Academic teacher
- Organizations: Orchestre Lamoureux Orchestre de l'Opéra-Comique Orchestre de l'Opéra national de Paris Conservatoire de Paris

Étienne Baudo (28 February 1903 – 30 May 2001) was a French oboist and teacher.

== Biography ==
Étienne Baudo was born in Marseille in the family of a fish salesman. In his youth, he worked in the port of Marseille. At the suggestion of his neighbors, he entered the Conservatoire de Marseille, then later enrolled in the class of Louis Bleuzet at the Conservatoire de Paris, graduating in 1924.

From 1929 to 1950 he was solo oboe at the Orchestre Lamoureux and played also at the Orchestre de l'Opéra-Comique. From the interwar period up to 1960, he was a member of the Orchestre de l'Opéra national de Paris held the position of solo oboe during the creation of Ravel's Boléro under the baton of the composer, before specialising on the cor anglais, playing the Concerto en sol in 1932, again under the baton of Ravel. Hans Knappertsbusch held Baudo in high esteem and requested that Baudo play at all of his concerts in France. He declined Charles Munch's offer to play in the Boston Symphony in the 1950s, prioritizing his career in Paris. As a professor in the Paris Conservatory, his notable students include Maurice Bourgue, Pierre Rolland, and Lajos Lencsés.

He was the husband of Germaine Tortelier, the older sister of Paul Tortelier, and the father of Serge Baudo. Baudo died 30 May 2001 in Marseille at the age of 98.
