= Brigitte Rolland =

Canadian violinist (born 1964)

Brigitte Rolland (born 8 October 1964) is a Canadian violinist. In 1988 she won the Prix d'Europe and was placed second in the London Philharmonic Orchestra Competition. She has appeared as a soloist in concerts with the CBC Quebec Chamber Orchestra, I Musici de Montréal, the Orchestre des jeunes du Québec, and the RCM Symphony Orchestra. She has performed at the Orford Festival, the Montreal International Music Festival, the Festival de musique de Lachine, and in recitals in Canada, England, France, and Spain. She has made appearances on CBC Radio and Radio Suisse Romande.

Born into a Montreal family of musicians, Rolland is the daughter of musician Pierre Rolland and the sister of cellist Sophie Rolland. She began studying the violin at the age of 5 with Maurice Onderet, and from 1971-1980 was a pupil of Mildred Goodman. In 1981 she entered McGill University where she was a student of Mauricio Fuks. From 1983-1987 she studied at the Royal College of Music in London under Rodney Friend, and was awarded an associate diploma.
