= Claude Lagacé =

Canadian musician, conductor, writer, and educator

Claude Lagacé (30 April 1917, Sorel-Tracy, Quebec – 7 February 2019, Quebec City) was a Canadian organist, choral conductor, writer on music, and music educator. He was trained as an organist by Henri Gagnon at Université Laval and also studied piano with Germaine Malépart in Quebec City. He was organist-choirmaster of the Rosary Cathedral in Toledo, Ohio from 1954 to 1961. During that time he concurrently worked on the faculty of the Gregorian Institute of America; an institution whose press published his treatise Sixteenth-Century Counterpoint in 1958. In 1957 he was named an associate of the American Guild of Organists.

In 1961 Lagacé returned to Canada when he was appointed organist of the Cathedral-Basilica of Notre-Dame de Québec; a post he held until his retirement in 1993. Simultaneously, he worked at the music school at Université Laval as full professor until 1989, and as assistant director from 1971 through 1978. When Pope John Paul II visited the Cathedral-Basilica of Notre-Dame de Québec in 1984, Lagacé performed the world premiere of Roger Matton's Tu es Petrus. He performed several times on the CBC Radio programs 'Récitals d'orgue and Tribune de l'orgue, and he recorded Marius Cayouette's Hymne pascal on the LP Hommage à Henri Gagnon (1974, Alpec Records).
