= Lescott =

Lescott is a surname. Notable people with the surname include:

- Aaron Lescott (born 1978), English footballer
- Joleon Lescott (born 1982), English footballer, brother of Aaron

== See also ==
- Lescot
