= Louis Fourestier =

French conductor (1892–1976)

Louis (Félix André) Fourestier (31 May 1892 – 30 September 1976) was a French conductor, composer and pedagogue, and was one of the founders of the Orchestre Symphonique de Paris.

== Early years, compositions and prizes ==
Fourestier was born in Montpellier, where he studied the cello at the local conservatory. He entered the Conservatoire de Paris in 1909 and was a pupil of Alexandre Guilmant, Paul Dukas, André Gedalge, Paul Vidal, Xavier Leroux (harmony) and Vincent d'Indy (conducting), winning prizes for harmony and counterpoint. In 1924, he won the Prix Rossini for his cantata Patria. This was followed by the Prix de Rome in 1925 for another cantata, La mort d'Adonis, and in 1927 the First Grand Prix for the symphonic poem Polynice.

== Conducting career ==
Returning from Rome, Fourestier was engaged as a cellist at the Opéra Comique. His conducting career commenced when, in 1927, he took charge of the orchestra for a performance of Pietro Mascagni's Cavalleria rusticana, and he was appointed principal conductor later that year, leaving the company in 1932. He subsequently conducted various orchestras in Paris and elsewhere (Angers, Cannes and Vichy). In 1928 he co-founded the Orchestre Symphonique de Paris along with Ernest Ansermet and Alfred Cortot, before giving way to Pierre Monteux. In 1938 he succeeded Philippe Gaubert as principal conductor at the Paris Opera, remaining there until 1965.

After World War II, Fourestier appeared as guest conductor in Spain, Germany, Italy and Switzerland. From 1946 to 1948 he conducted thirty-two performances of Lakmé, Carmen, Faust, Manon and Louise at the Metropolitan Opera in New York City and on tour. Among the singers were Licia Albanese, Lily Pons, Dorothy Kirsten, Bidu Sayão, Risë Stevens, Jennie Tourel, Jussi Björling, John Brownlee, Mack Harrell, Jerome Hines, Raoul Jobin, Robert Merrill, Ezio Pinza and Ramón Vinay.

== Professor of conducting and final years ==
From 1945 to 1963, Fourestier was professor of conducting at the Paris Conservatoire. Louis Frémaux, Pierre Rolland, Yves Prin and Allain Gaussin were among his students. At the age of 82, he conducted in La Madeleine a celebration of the 60th anniversary of the death of Gabriel Fauré. Two years later, he died in the Paris suburb of Boulogne-Billancourt.
