= Antoine Bouchard (musician) =

Antoine Bouchard (22 March 1932 – 21 October 2015) was a Canadian organist, composer, Roman Catholic priest, writer on music, organ builder, and music educator. He performed as an organist in the USA, France, and throughout eastern and central Canada. His recordings include Hommage à Henri Gagnon which included music by Henri Gagnon and two works by Bouchard: Postlude and Messe de Requiem. His music has been published by Ostiguy - Heritage Publishers. He wrote articles on organ building and organ performance for several Canadian music journals and for the European Music Council.

== Life and career ==
Born Antoine Rodrigue Albert Bouchard in Saint-Philippe-de-Néri, Quebec, Bouchard studied organ privately with Yvette Michaud (1942-1943), Claude Lavoie (1944-1949; 1952-1956), and Léon Destroismaisons (1950-1952). He attended Laval University where he earned a BA in 1952 and a Licentiate of Theology in 1956. After being ordained as a Roman Catholic priest in 1956, he pursued further organ studies in Paris from 1958-1961 with Gaston Litaize, Simone Plé-Caussade, and Antoine Reboulot.

In 1961 he returned to Canada to join the music faculties at Laval University and the College Sainte-Anne-de-la-Pocatière. He served as director of the School of Music at Laval from 1977-1980. In 1966 he co-founded Les Amis de l'orgue de Québec; a non-profit professional association of organists in Québec. He was the featured performer for a series of concerts made for CBC Radio in 1975-1976 in which he performed in six different European countries on twenty historically important organs. He was appointed to the Board of the Canadian Music Council in 1978.

He died on 21 October 2015 at Sainte-Claire.
