= Marius Cayouette =

Canadian musician (1904–1985)

Marius Cayouette (3 November 1904, Sainte-Justine, Quebec – 16 March 1985, Quebec City) was a Canadian organist, composer, and music educator. As a composer, he is best known for his works for organ, including Deux Ex-voto, Offertoire on Hodie Christus natus es, Thèmes grégoriens for Easter, Deux Miniatures (Christmas and Easter), and Prélude sur un cantique à Ste-Anne. He is also known for his Ave Maria for soprano.

Cayouette was the organist at the Église de Saint-Grégoire-le-Grand in Montreal from 1924 to 1974. He concurrently served as the chair of musical aesthetics at Laval University from 1946 to 1952. He also taught both music history and music aesthetics on the faculty of the Conservatoire de musique du Québec. He was a member of the Diocesan Commission for Sacred Music. His papers are held in the Claude Lagacé collection at the Bibliothèque et Archives nationales du Québec.
