= Roger Matton =

Canadian composer, ethnomusicologist, and educator (1929–2004)

Roger Matton OC (18 May 1929 – 7 June 2004) was a Canadian composer, ethnomusicologist, and music educator. As a composer his works are characterized by their association with folklore and folk music.

== Early life and education ==
Born in Granby, Quebec, Matton was trained at the Conservatoire de musique du Québec à Montréal where he was a pupil of Claude Champagne (composition), Isabelle Delorme (music theory), and Arthur Letondal (piano). He pursued further studies in Paris with Nadia Boulanger, Olivier Messiaen, and Andrée Vaurabourg. He then studied ethnology at the National Museum of Canada with Marius Barbeau.

== Career ==
Matton started his career working for the Canadian Broadcasting Corporation as a composer in both radio and television. In 1956 he joined the staff of Université Laval where he worked as a researcher and ethnomusicologist in the UL's folklore archives through 1976. He transcribed roughly 300 Acadian songs between 1957 and 1959. Among his students was composer Alain Gagnon.

In 1965 he was awarded the Prix de la création at the Congrès du spectacle. In 1966 the Montreal Symphony Orchestra included his Mouvement symphonique II in their concert repertoire for their 1966 tour of the Soviet Union, making it one of the first symphonic works by a Canadian composer to be performed in that nation. Soon after his Concerto for Two Pianos and Orchestra was performed and recorded by the Toronto Symphony and released in the United States by Capitol Records.

Matton was awarded the Calixa-Lavallée Award in 1969 and in 1984 he was named an Officer of the Order of Canada.

== Selected compositions ==
- Te Deum
- Mouvement symphonique II, 1962
- "Concerto for Two Pianos and Orchestra", 1964
- "Danse brésilienne"
- Tu es Petrus, 1984 (premiered by Claude Lagacé at the Cathedral-Basilica of Notre-Dame de Québec on the occasion of the visit of Pope John Paul II)

== Sources ==
- Roger Matton at The Canadian Encyclopedia
