= Ermitage (concert hall) =

Coordinates: 45.4960°N 73.5853°W

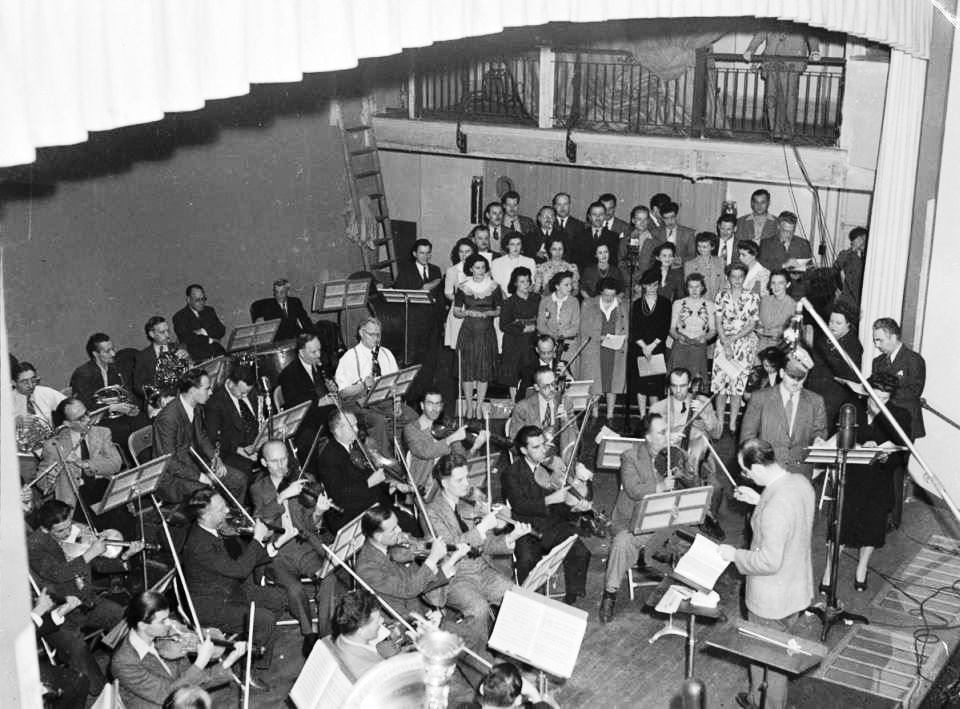
Radio-Canada recording at the Ermitage in 1943

Ermitage is a performance hall in Montreal, Quebec, Canada. Built in 1914, the hall is located on the campus of the Collège de Montréal at the corner of Côte-des-Neiges Road and Doctor Penfield Avenue In addition to being used for student theatrical and musical performances, the hall has been used for a variety of professional commercial performances as well. From 1942 to 1952 the hall was the main performance venue of the Little Symphony of Montreal. Other artists to have performed in the hall include, Jean-Marie Beaudet, Alexander Brott, Elisabeth Schumann, the McGill String Quartet, and the Montreal String Quartet. The Canadian Broadcasting Corporation used the hall frequently for broadcast performances from 1944 to 1967. Since the 1970s, the hall's activities have primarily been relegated to college productions.
