= Jean Renaud =

Canadian merchant

Jean Renaud (c. 1734 – 16 March 1794) is first noted in Canadian history in 1768 when he married at Quebec City. He owned property and was a merchant

Renaud was noted during the American siege of Quebec in the winter of 1775–1776 as a member of the British militia. He distinguished himself during an American assault on the barricades. In recognition of his service he was appointed as chief road commissioner for the District of Quebec in 1782.

Renaud was involved in a number of important improvements to the roads of the area. He built the first road from the St. Lawrence River to Lake Témiscouata. This road was important for improved royal mail service to Fort Howe, New Brunswick.
