= Andrée Lescot =

Haitian singer and showgirl

Andrée Lescot was a singer, showgirl, soprano and daughter of Haitian president Élie Lescot. Lescot was educated in Canada, where she studied for eight years at the École de musique Vincent-d'Indy. She was featured on local radio before moving to Paris where she attended the Versailles conservatory. Afterwards she landed a role in a musical by Albert Willemetz. She published several records of Haitian and Louisiana folk songs, accompanied by French music professor Roger Bourdin and his orchestra. Depicted in a costume holding bow and arrow, she received attention in the African-American press in 1954 for starring in a revue in Lausanne, Switzerland. In 1952, she appeared on a Canadian TV program entitled "Chansons Créoles avec Andrée Lescot" where she sang three Haitian folkloric songs. In 1955 the album Chansons Créoles Chansons Folkloriques D'Haïti was released on the London International label. In the same year she married French actor Roger Murciano.

== Early prizes ==
In Canada, Lescot received a Ladies' Morning Musical Club scholarship as well as a prize from the Montréal Social Club aka Club Social de Montréal. She was second at a Singing Stars of Tomorrow contest in Toronto.

== Early career in Canada ==
Prior to leaving Canada for Paris, Lescot offered several concerts and recitals on Canadian radio. She sang with Jean Deslauriers' orchestra and presented at a conference with Jean Vallerand.

== Discography ==
Chansons Créoles, Chansons Folkloriques d'Haiti. Label: London International, 1955

Chansons Créoles, Chansons Folkoriques d'Haiti, Label: Decca, 1960s

Chansons Créoles, Label: Decca, 1960s
