= Petros Shoujounian =

Armenian Canadian composer (born c. 1957)

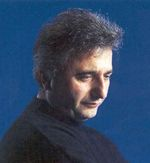
- Petros Shoujounian
- Born: 1957 (age 68–69)
- Era: 20th century

Petros Shoujounian (born 1957) is an Armenian Canadian composer who focuses on orchestral, piano, chamber, and choral music.

== Life ==
Petros Shoujounian was born in Gyumri (then Leninakan, Armenia in 1957. At the age of twelve, Shoujounian began to compose his own music. He eventually studied music at the Yerevan State Komitas State Conservatory and continued his education at the Garu Mourza College of Music. Shoujounian moved to Canada in 1976 and pursued studies at the Quebec Conservatory of Music under the famed Canadian composer Gilles Tremblay. He gained his MA in composition in 1982. Eventually he would direct the Armenian Choirs of Knar and Alemshah based in Montreal. He is also a publisher of records of the works of Armenian composers. Shoujounian has worked with numerous orchestras, such as I Musici de Montreal, NEM, Kitchener, London (Ontario) and Laval. He has also worked with soloists such as Marie-Josée Simard, Pierre Jasmin, Jean Laurendeau, and others.

He currently resides in Quebec, Canada.

== Works ==
=== Orchestral ===
- Akhtamar, bassoon, small orchestra (1983)
- Trois miniatures, 12 or more strings, (1984)
- Rhapsodie, cello, small orchestra (1985)
- Sayat nova (suite concertante), vibraphone (+ xylophone, marimba), orchestra (1988–92)
- Concerto, cello, string orchestra (1995)

=== Chamber music ===
- Suite, violin (1968–74)
- Horovele, clarinet (1979)
- Arax, string quartet, (1980)
- Dzez – à vous, piano, triangle (1982)
- Hour, ondes Martenot (1983)
- Funny Dialogues, 2 violins (1985)
- Le jeu, violin, cello, piano, (1985)
- Kour – Fleuve, string quartet (1985)
- Sassouni, piccolo, alto flute, harpsichord (1985)
- Monologue 1, viola (1985)
- Monologue 2, guitar (1985)
- Monologue 3, percussion (1985)
- Monologue 4, cello (1986)
- Cinq danses arméniennes, piano, vibraphone (1987)
- Odzouny, ondes Martenot, ensemble (1987)
- Arevagal, bassoon, French horn, viola (1991)
- Artsakh, 4 ondes Martenot (1993)

=== Choral ===
- Ararat: Poème symphonique (text by Mardiros Kavukjian), soprano, alto, tenor, bass, mixed chorus, large orchestra (1981)
- Spirit divine attend our prayers, mixed chorus, organ (1985)
- Surp Khach – Holy Cross (oratorio), soprano, mezzo-soprano, baritone, mixed chorus, flute, oboe, clarinet, French horn, 2 violins, viola, cello, double bass, 3 percussion (2000)

=== Vocal ===
- Suite vocale de trois pièces, soprano, piano (1981)
- 18 Armenian Religious Chants, soprano, small orchestra (2001)

=== Piano ===
- Les pistes de jours (1978)
- La petite Elsie (1981)
- Mashtots, 2 pianos (1982)
- Monologue 5 (1986)

=== Organ ===
- Lui pour nous (1983)

== Notable concerts ==
In 2001, for the 1700th anniversary of the Christianization of Armenia, Shoujounian performed three pieces of ancient Armenian liturgical music. The concert featured famed Canadian Armenian soprano Isabel Bayrakdarian.

=== Film music ===
His music was featured in the 1979 film L'Arrache-Coeur (English: Heart Break).

== Discography ==
In 1997 SNE Records (established 1978) published a CD of the works of Shoujounian. The CD eventually received the Best Modern International Award by AMFA of Los Angeles in 1999.
