= Prix Archambault =

Annual Canadian music competition from 1940-1962

The Prix Archambault was a Canadian music competition and prize that was awarded from 1940 through 1962. Established by Edmond Archambault, the competition and prize was initially administered by the Matinées Symphoniques Committee of the Montreal Symphony Orchestra from 1940 to 1942. Beginning with the 1943 competition, Maurice Crépault of the Archambault firm administered the prize until it ceased operation following the 1962 competition.

== Notable winners ==
- Jacqueline Martel (1957)
