= Albert Grenier =

Canadian pianist, academic, and university administrator

Joseph Jacques Albert Grenier (31 August 1939, Shawinigan – 26 February 2026, Beaconsfield) is a Canadian pianist, academic, and university administrator. From 1979–1998 he was director of the Conservatoire de musique du Québec à Montréal (CMM).

== Life and career ==
Grenier studied piano with Georges Savaria both privately and at the CMM from 1952–1957. After earning a bachelor's degree from the Université de Montréal in 1957, he pursued further studies with Jean Doyen and Vlado Perlemuter at the Conservatoire de Paris. In 1960 he was given honourable mention at the Maria Canals International Music Competition in Spain. From 1962–1964 he was a pupil in the graduate program at the Badische Hochschule für Musik in Karlsruhe where he studied under Yvonne Loriod and earned a Master of Music degree in 1964.

Grenier actively worked as a concert pianist from 1962–1973, during which time he performed in concerts and recitals throughout Canada, France, and Germany. He was a soloist with Badische Staatskapelle, the CBC Quebec Chamber Orchestra, and Orchestre Symphonique de Québec among other orchestras. From 1967–1974 he taught acoustics and piano at the Cégep de Saint-Laurent and from 1967–1974 he taught on the piano faculty at the Université de Montréal (UM). While teaching at the UM he also earned a doctorate from that school in 1971 with his dissertation entitled 'Sonate pour deux pianos de Bruce Mather.
