= Jocelyne Binet =

Canadian composer, pianist, and music educator (1923 - 1968)

Jocelyne Binet (27 September 1923 – 13 January 1968) was a Canadian composer, pianist, and music educator. She studied in Montreal and Paris, France, and returned to compose and teach music in Canada.

== Biography ==
Binet was born in East Angus, near Sherbrooke, Quebec, and obtained two music degrees in Montreal before traveling to Paris, France, for studies in piano. She studied under Claude Champagne, Jean Dansereau and Jean-Marie Beaudet at the École Supérieure de Musique d'Outremont (École de musique Vincent-d'Indy). She continued her studies at the Paris Conservatory in 1948 and 1949 on a grant from the French government and again in 1949 and 1951 on another grant from the Quebec government, where her teachers were Tony Aubin, Noël Gallon and Olivier Messiaen. Binet died in Quebec City in 1968.

== Music career ==
In 1946 Binet was awarded a CAPAC (Association des compositeurs, auteurs et éditeurs du Canada Ltée) prize for composition. After returning from Paris to Canada, she taught from 1951 to 1957 at the École Vincent-d'Indy, from 1952 to 1961 at the Centre d'arts Orford, and from 1957 to 1959 at the Conservatoire de musique du Québec. From 1952 to 1961, she taught at the Jeunesses musicales du Canada (JMC) summer camps. She also taught analysis and counterpoint at Laval University from 1957 to 1968.

Binet's works have been performed in the media and in concert in North America, South America and Europe. They were favored in particular by the Canadian Trio (1948), including Gilles Lefebvre, Colombe Pelletier and Rafael Masella. Her papers are held at the Archives Nationales du Québec (ANQ) in Quebec City.

== Works ==
Binet composed works for orchestra, chamber ensemble, choir and solo voice. Her works include four pieces for orchestra: Evocation (1948), Danse (1949), Un Canadien à Paris (1951) and L'Amour endormi. Her chamber music includes Trio for violin, cello and piano (1945) and Suite for flute, piano, and strings (1946). She also composed Petite Suite Vocale (1945) for solo voice, female choir, and piano, with words by Jean-Henri Fabre, and Nocturne (1946). Gérard Souzay sang her Cycle de Mélodies on seven poems by Paul Éluard in a 1955 recital program.
