= European Music Council =

- Formation: 1972
- Type: European Umbrella Organisation
- Headquarters: Bonn, Germany
- Members: 74 active members
- Sec. Gen.: Simone Dudt, Ruth Jakobi
- Website: www.emc-imc.org

The European Music Council (EMC) is the European regional group of the International Music Council (IMC), representing a network of music organisations across Europe. It was established in 1972 as the European regional group of the IMC and adopted its current name in 1992. The IMC was founded by UNESCO in 1949 and is an international non-governmental organisation that maintains formal relations with UNESCO. Until 2000, the EMC secretariat was based in Aarau, Switzerland, before relocating to Bonn, Germany, where it is currently headquartered.

The EMC operates as a non-governmental organisation and network focused on music policy, cultural cooperation, advocacy and the development of the European music sector. It brings together 74 member organisations from 28 countries, encompassing four membership categories: European Music Organisations, International Music Organisations, National Music Councils, and National or Specialised Music Organisations. Its membership represents a broad range of musical disciplines and professional fields, including music education, performance, composition, cultural organisations and music industry associations..

== Members ==
As of October 2026, the European Music Council (EMC) has 74 member organisations based in 28 countries. Its membership is divided into four categories: 12 National Music Councils, 17 International Music Organisations, 19 European Music Organisations, and 26 National or Specialised Music Organisations.

=== National Music Councils ===
The EMC includes 12 National Music Councils, representing the music sectors of their respective countries:

- Austria - Österreichischer Musikrat (ÖMR)
- Czech Republic - Česká hudební rada (ČHR)
- Estonia - Eesti Muusikanõukogu (EMN)
- Finland - Suomen musiikkineuvosto (FMC)
- Germany - Deutscher Musikrat (DMR)
- Hungary - Magyar Zenei Tanács (MZT)
- Italy - Comitato Nazionale Italiano Musica (CIDIM)
- Latvia - Latvijas Nacionālā Mūzikas padome (LNMC)
- Norway - Norsk musikkråd (NMR)
- Poland - Polska Rada Muzyczna (PRM)
- Switzerland - Schweizer Musikrat (SMR)
- Ukraine - National All-Ukrainian Music Union (НВМС)

=== International Music Organisations ===
The EMC has 17 member organisations operating at an international level, representing a range of musical disciplines and professional activities.

- European Festivals Association (EFA)
- International Association of Music Centres (IAMIC)
- International Association of Music Libraries, Archives and Documentation Centres (IAML)
- International Association of Schools of Jazz (IASJ)
- International Confederation of Accordionists (CIA)
- International Confederation of Electroacoustic Music (CIME)
- International Federation for Choral Music (IFCM)
- International Federation of Chopin Societies (IFCS)
- International Federation of Musicians (FIM)
- International Music + Media Centre (IMZ)
- International Music Products Association (NAMM)
- International Society for Contemporary Music (ISCM)
- International Society for Music Education (ISME)
- Jeunesses Musicales International (JMI)
- World Federation of Amateur Orchestras (WFAO)
- World Federation of International Music Competitions (WFIMC)
- Zone Franche

=== European Music Organisations ===
The EMC has 19 European Music Organisations among its members. These organisations operate across multiple European countries and represent different areas of the music sector, including music education, professional networks, performance, composition and cultural cooperation.

- Association Européenne des Conservatoires, Académies de Musique et Musikhochschulen (AEC)
- Europe Jazz Network (EJN)
- European Association for Music in Schools (EAS)
- European Broadcasting Union (EBU)
- European Chamber Music Teachers' Association (ECMTA)
- European Choral Association (ECA)
- European Composer and Songwriter Alliance (ECSA)
- European Concert Hall Organisation (ECHO)
- European Early Music Network (REMA)
- European Federation of National Youth Orchestras (EFNYO)
- European Folk Network (EFN)
- European Music School Union (EMU)
- European Orchestra Federation (EOFed)
- European String Teachers Association (ESTA)
- European Union of Music Competitions for Youth (EMCY)
- European Voice Teachers Association (EVTA)
- Live DMA - European Network of National Live Music Associations
- Tenso - European Network for Professional Chamber Choirs
- Young Music Talents in Europe (YMTE)

=== National and Specialised Music Organisations ===
The EMC has 26 National and Specialised Music Organisations among its members. This category includes organisations, associations, foundations and other entities working in specific areas of music and culture at national or specialised levels.

- Acadèmia Catalana de la Música
- Asociația Trib'Art
- Association Nationale Cultures du Monde (ANCM)
- Avantgarde Cultural Foundation
- BOZAR - Centre for Fine Arts
- Bulgarian Music Association (BMA)
- Center for Music Ecosystems
- CHROMA/Zebrock
- Classical ME SRL
- Curso de Música Silva Monteiro (CMSM)
- Cyprus Symphony Orchestra Foundation (CySO)
- Federació Catalana d'Entitats Corals (FCEC)
- Federació Catalana de Societats Musicals (FCSM)
- Flemish Music Council (MRVL)
- Hangvető
- Ionian Symphony Orchestra
- L'Alliance Musicale Luxembourg
- Live Music Now Scotland (LMNS)
- Miso Music Portugal
- Moviment Coral Català (MCC)
- Music Council of the French Community of Belgium (CdM)
- SafeMUSE - Safe Music Havens Initiative
- Scottish Music Centre (SMC)
- UNiSSON
- Unison - Croatian Music Alliance
- Ukrainian Institute

== Board of the European Music Council ==
The Board of the European Music Council is elected for a two-year term at the EMC's Annual Meeting. The most recent elections took place online on 26 June 2025. The following members are listed for the 2025-2027 term, including one co-opted member:

- Mila Georgieva (BG), Chair - Nominated by the Bulgarian Music Association.
- Angharad Cooper (IE/FR), Vice Chair - Nominated by the Center for Music Ecosystems, Head of Operations at the Center for Music Ecosystems.
- Niels Græsholm (DK), Treasurer - Nominated by the International Federation for Choral Music (IFCM), Associate Professor of Choral Conducting at the University of Copenhagen.
- Joanna Grotkowska (PL) - Nominated by the Polish Music Council, music critic, journalist and radio producer.
- Martí Ferrer i Bosch (ES) - Nominated by Moviment Coral Català, choral conductor of Capella Polifònica de Girona, GiroNins and La Jove.
- Inese Zagorska (LV) - Nominated by the Latvian Music Council, Artistic Director of Cēsis Concert Hall.
- Guillermo Rodríguez (ES) - Co-opted by the EMC Board, Co-founder of the Spanish Federation of Music Students.
- Claudia Stobrawa (DE/AT) - Nominated by the European Early Music Network (REMA), Head of the Nikolaus Harnoncourt Zentrum.
- Robert Vroegindeweij (NL) - Nominated by the European Music School Union (EMU), Director of Muziekschool Zeeland.

== Annual meetings ==
The European Music Council hosts an annual meeting to discuss the work of the council. From 2010, the Annual Meeting was combined with a new European Forum on Music, based on the model set by the International Music Council's World Forum on Music.

Year	Place	Theme
2004	The Hague, the Netherlands	Conference on 'Improvisation in Music'
2005	Budapest, Hungary	Forum 'Many Musics in Europe'
2006	Malmö, Sweden	'Turning Points: Music, Youth Diversity'
2007	Barcelona, Spain	'Chances and Challenges: Music and the Future'
2008	Brno, Czech Republic	Forum 'Access to Music: New Perspectives in Distribution, Education and Politics'
2009	Athens, Greece	'ExTra Final Event: Immigration and Multiculturalism. The Musical Dimension'
2010	Vienna, Austria	1st European Forum on Music:'Music Diversity: Looking Back, Looking Forward'
2011	Tallinn, Estonia	4th World Forum on Music: 'Music and Social Change' - in cooperation with the IMC
2012	Istanbul, Turkey	2nd European Forum on Music:'Transcending Boundaries – Building Bridges'
2013	Glasgow, Scotland	3rd European Forum on Music:'Re>>generating Europe through Music'
2014	Bern, Switzerland	4th European Forum on Music:'Music and Politics: a shared responsibility'
2015	Riga, Latvia	5th European Forum on Music:'Access to Music is digital?'
2016	Wrocław, Poland	6th European Forum on Music:'Musical Homelands: New Territories'
2017	Paphos, Cyprus	7th European Forum on Music:'Music and Cultural Diplomacy: Linking Continents – Bridging Cultures'
2018	Oslo, Norway	8th European Forum on Music: 'Looking Back – Looking Forward. The Future of Europe’s Musical Roots'
2019	Paris, France	6th World Forum on Music: 'Give me Five: The Five Music Rights in Action!' - in cooperation with the IMC
2020	Online	European Forum on Music Online Series: 'Climate Action: Music as a Driver for Change'
2021	Online	European Forum on Music: 'Claiming a front row seat. The place of music in society'
2022	Cyprus	Culture Summit: Music 2022
2023	Budapest, Hungary	11th World Forum on Music: Sustain music
2024	Sofia, Bulgaria	12th European Forum on Music - Equity in Music
2025	Brussels, Belgium	13th European Forum on Music - Celebrating Musical Diversity
2026	Timisoara, Romania	14th European Forum on Music - Music, Health and Wellbeing

== Projects and other events ==
=== European Agenda for Music ===
The European Music Council coordinates and participates in European cooperation projects focusing on music, cultural policy, environmental sustainability, professional development and international collaboration. Its activities include EU-funded initiatives, training programmes, research projects and events involving music organisations and cultural professionals across Europe.

=== GreenBeat Nexus ===
GreenBeat Nexus is a four-year European project launched in January 2026, co-funded by the European Union under the Creative Europe programme's Music Moves Europe initiative. The project aims to support the environmental sustainability of the European music sector through research, professional training, knowledge exchange and financial support.

The initiative focuses on identifying sustainability challenges and good practices, strengthening environmental expertise among music professionals and supporting the implementation of sustainable approaches to music production, touring, live performance and other music-related activities.

The project includes the establishment of a Network of Green Specialists and the distribution of €3.6 million in financial support to at least 60 projects through three open calls.

GreenBeat Nexus is coordinated by INOVA+ (Portugal), in partnership with the European Music Council (Germany), The Green Room (France), On the Move (Belgium) and KEA European Affairs (Belgium). The project is scheduled to run until 2029.

=== SHIFT - Shared Initiatives for Training ===
SHIFT - Shared Initiatives for Training was a European cooperation project coordinated by the European Music Council and co-funded by the European Union's Erasmus+ programme. Implemented between December 2019 and January 2022, the project brought together nine European cultural networks to strengthen the capacity of cultural organisations to address challenges related to the United Nations Sustainable Development Goals.

The project focused on four areas: cultural leadership, environmental sustainability, inclusion, and gender and power relations. Its activities resulted in training materials, guidelines, research publications and practical resources for cultural networks and organisations.

Following the project's conclusion, its environmental sustainability work contributed to the development of the SHIFT Culture eco-certification, a certification scheme designed specifically for cultural networks.

The certification pilot was launched in January 2023, with the European Music Council participating alongside other international cultural networks. The initiative provides guidelines and assessment mechanisms to support organisations in measuring, monitoring and reducing their environmental impact.

The EMC has received SHIFT eco-certification for three consecutive years and has incorporated the certification's recommendations into its organisational sustainability policies and practices.

=== EMC Fellowship Programme ===
The EMC Fellowship Programme is a professional development initiative aimed at emerging professionals working in the European music sector, including performers, composers, producers, educators, cultural managers, researchers and other music professionals.

Co-funded by the European Union's Creative Europe programme, the Fellowship provides opportunities for international networking, professional development, mentoring and participation in European cultural policy discussions.

The programme runs in two-year cycles and selects up to ten participants per edition. Fellows gain access to EMC events and activities, including the European Forum on Music, as well as opportunities to engage with EMC member organisations and participate in a one-to-one mentoring programme with experienced music professionals.

The programme seeks to encourage the involvement of emerging professionals in European music networks and cultural policy processes. The 2026-2028 edition includes ten selected Fellows from different professional and geographical backgrounds.

=== European Forum on Music ===
The European Forum on Music (EFM) is a recurring international conference organised by the European Music Council, bringing together music professionals, cultural organisations, researchers and policymakers to discuss developments and challenges affecting the European music sector.

Established in 2010, the Forum addresses topics such as cultural policy, music education, artistic freedom, diversity, sustainability and the role of music in society.

The 14th European Forum on Music took place from 9 to 12 June 2026 in Timișoara, Romania, under the theme Music, Health and Wellbeing. The programme explored the relationship between music and physical and mental health, the role of music in healthcare and community settings, and the working conditions and wellbeing of music professionals.

=== European Agenda for Music ===
The European Agenda for Music (EAM) is a cultural policy initiative developed by the European Music Council through a consultation process involving stakeholders from across the European music sector.

Launched on 21 March 2018 in Brussels, the Agenda identifies shared priorities and challenges for the European music sector and provides a framework for dialogue between music professionals, cultural organisations and policymakers.

It builds on earlier EMC policy documents, including the Manifesto for Youth and Music in Europe and the Bonn Declaration, and addresses issues related to music education, access to music, cultural diversity, artistic freedom and the sustainable development of the music sector.
