= Saint-Dominique Church (Quebec City) =

- Église Saint-Dominique
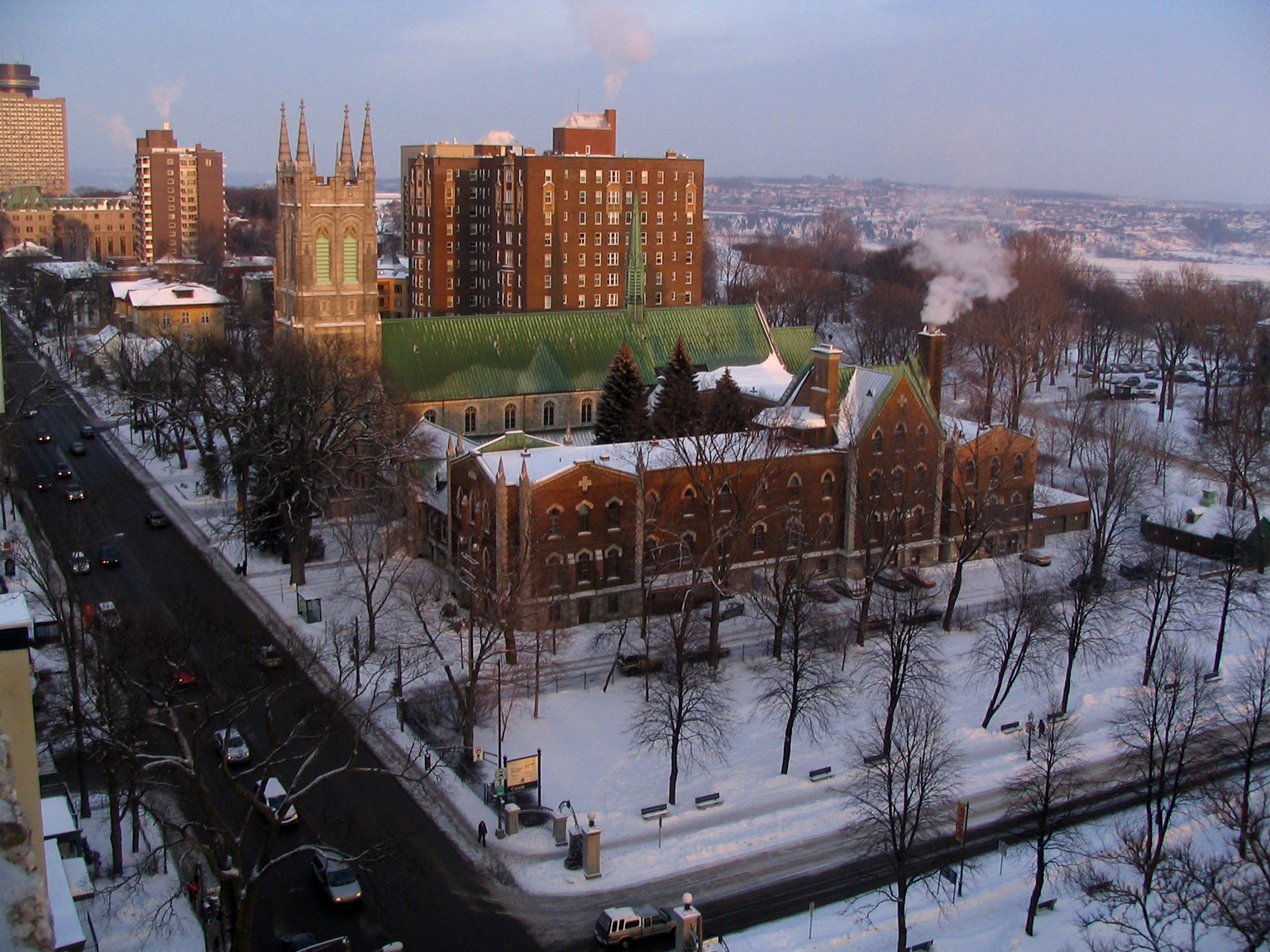
- Saint-Dominique Church
- 46°48′00″N 71°13′24″W
- Location: 175, Grande-Allée Ouest; Quebec City, Quebec; G1R 2H1
- Country: Canada
- Denomination: Roman Catholic
- Website: Paroisse Saint-Dominique

History
- Dedication: Saint Dominic

Architecture
- Functional status: Active
- Architect: Joseph-Albert LaRue
- Style: Gothic Revival
- Groundbreaking: 1929
- Completed: 1930

Specifications
- Materials: White Granite

Patrimoine culturel du Québec
- Official name: Église de Saint-Dominique
- Designated: 2014

Administration
- Archdiocese: Archdiocese of Quebec

Saint-Dominique Church (French: Église Saint-Dominique) is a Roman Catholic church in Quebec City, Quebec, Canada. It was constructed between 1929 and 1930. In 2014, the church was added to the Répertoire du patrimoine culturel du Québec.

== History ==
The Dominicans arrived in Quebec City in 1906. They worked out of the Chapel of St. Dominic. In 1925, after nearly twenty years there, the chapel became home to a parish.

After a few years, the congregation became too large for the chapel, so St. Dominic's Church was built to replace the chapel. It was built in the style of English Gothic Revival and the first Mass was celebrated in the church at 25 December 1930.

== Gallery ==
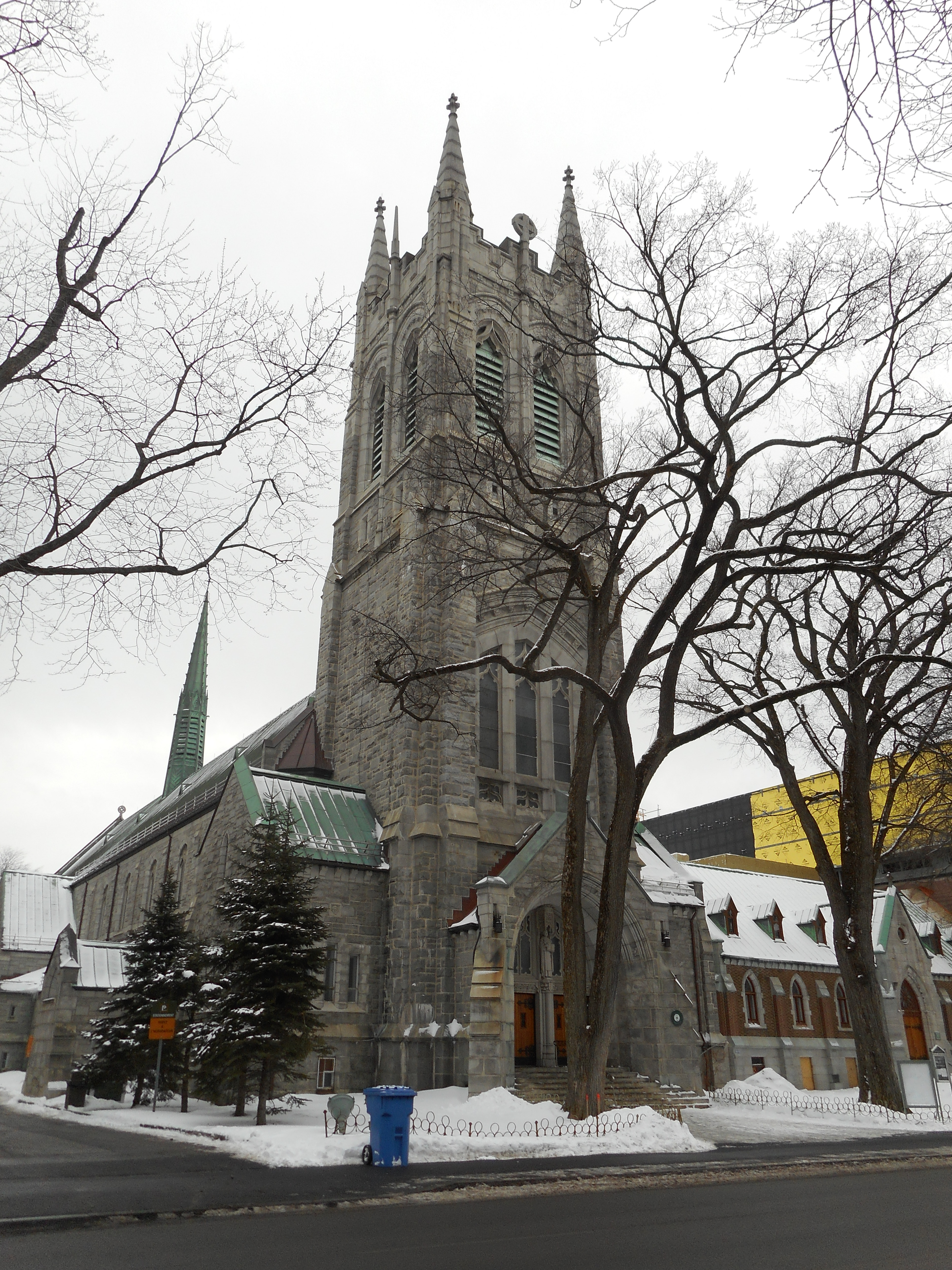
West side of the church

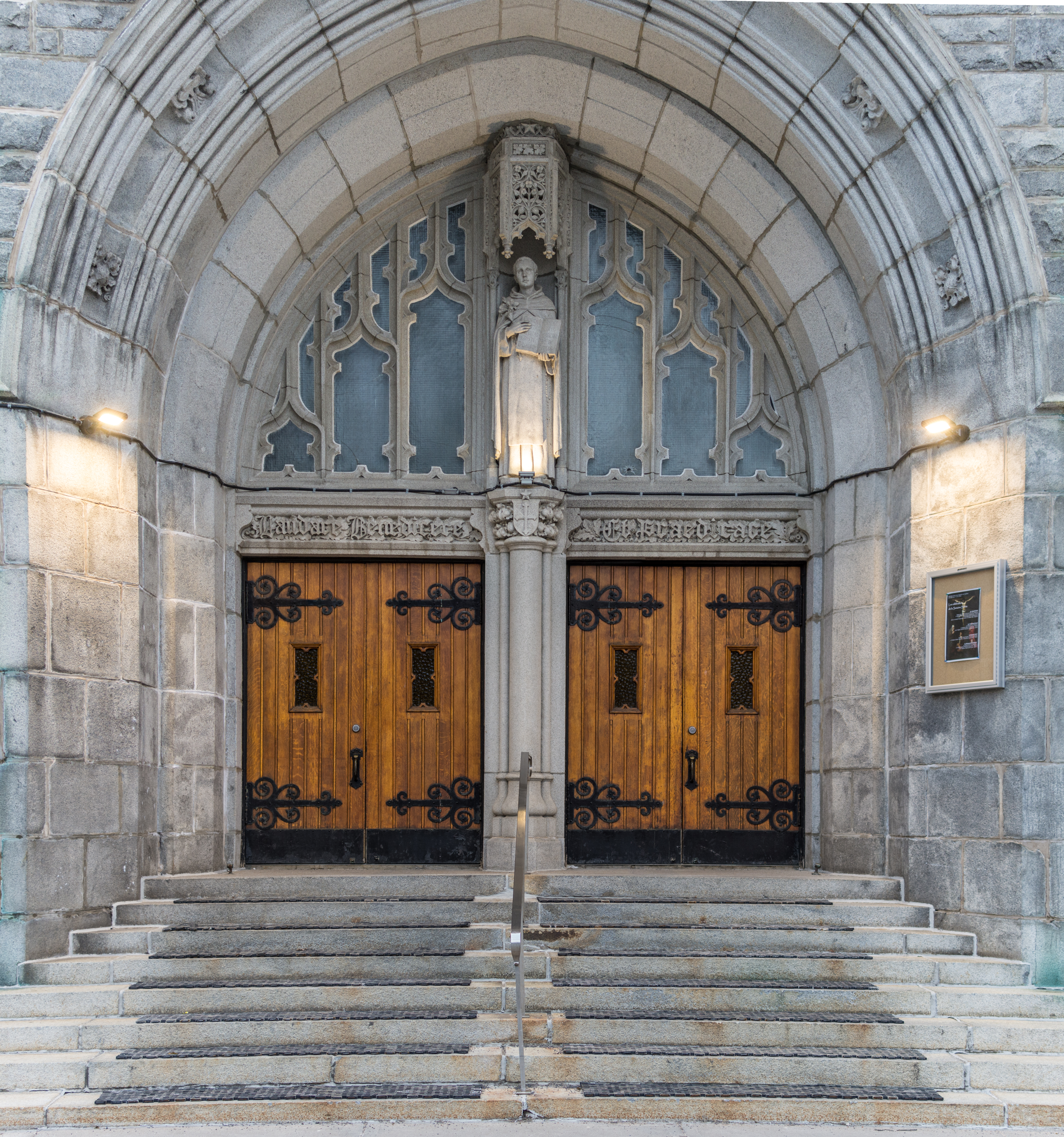
Front entrance

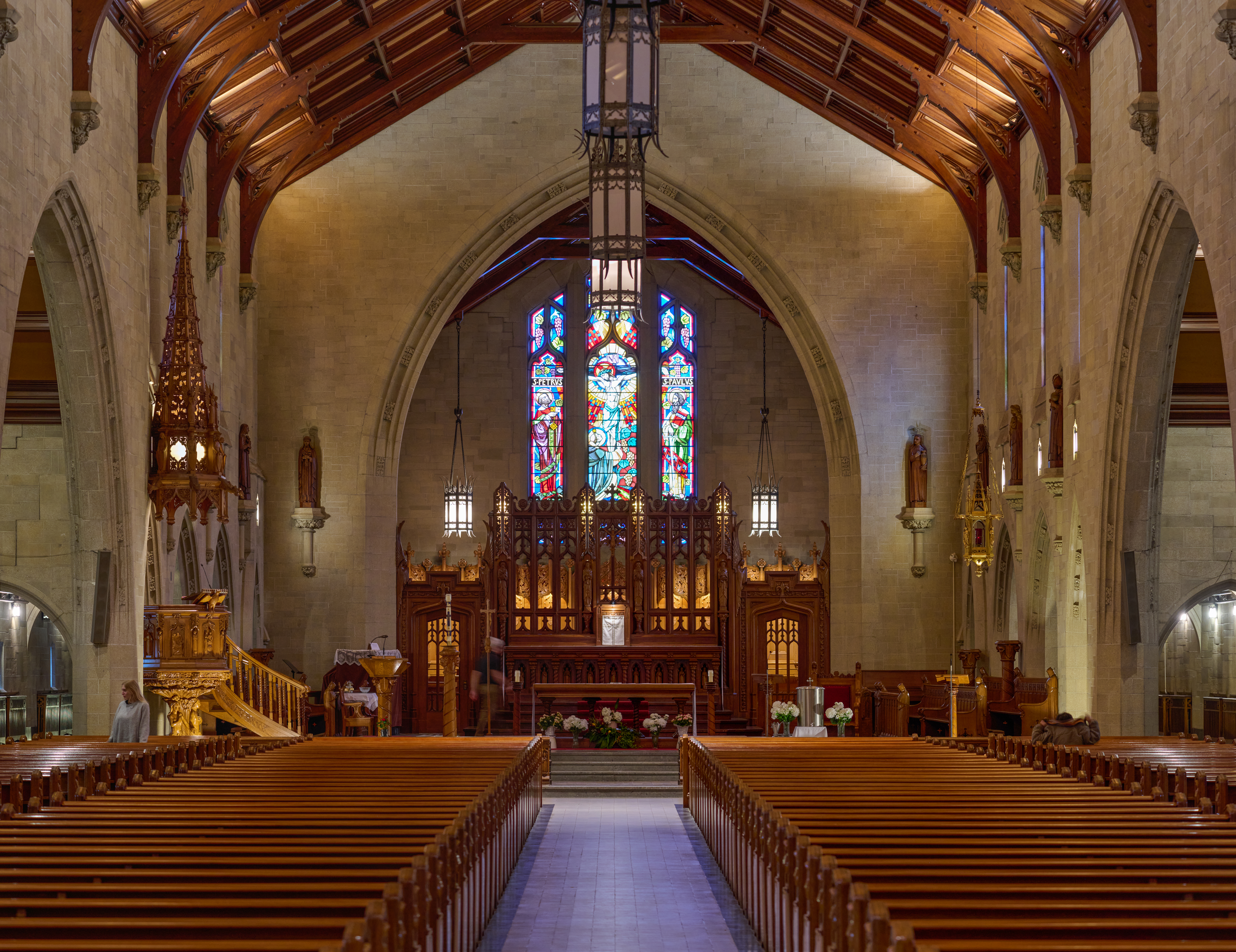
Interior

== See also ==
- Saint-Jean-Baptiste Church (Quebec City)
