= École de musique Vincent-d'Indy =

Private music college in Montreal, Canada

Coordinates: 45°30′42″N 73°36′47″W

- Type: Music College
- Established: 1920s
- Officer in charge: Antonella Picillo (Director General)
- Location: 628, chemin de la Côte-Sainte-Catherine; Montreal, Quebec, Canada; H2V 2C5
- Campus: Urban
- Website: Official Site

The école de musique Vincent-d'Indy is a subsidized private music college situated in Montreal, Quebec, Canada in the Outremont district, that specializes in music education. The school was named after the French composer, Vincent d'Indy.

== Programs ==
L'école Vincent-d'Indy offers programs that result in students receiving a Diploma of College Studies (often referred to as a DEC - a Diplôme d'études collégiales) in:

- Music
- Music and Languages
- Music and Mathematics
- Music and Sciences and Nature
- Music and Human Sciences
- Music and Arts and Letters

The school also offers extracurricular courses in music to youth in primary and secondary school as well as to adults. It also maintains a resource of approximately 400 affiliated professors throughout Quebec.

The current Director General is Yves Petit.

== History ==
=== Early 20th century ===
The school has its origin of program of musical studies begun by Sister Marie-Stéphane (Hélène Côté) in the school of the Congregation of Sisters of the Holy Names of Jesus and Marie (also known as Collège Jésus-Marie) in the 1920s. In 1932, the foundations were made for the École supérieure de musique d'Outremont, affiliated with the Faculty of Arts at the Université de Montréal.

=== Middle and late 20th Century ===
The school adopted its current name in 1951 on the occasion of the centenary of the birth of the French composer and pedagogue Vincent d'Indy.

The Vincent-d'Indy music school offered, up until 1978, a university program in music.

== Notable faculty ==
- Jean-Marie Beaudet
- Yvonne Duckett
- Yvonne Hubert
- Juliette Milette
- Léo-Pol Morin
- Frédéric Pelletier
- Rosette Renshaw

== Notable alumni ==
- Jocelyne Binet
- Colette Boky
- Micheline Coulombe Saint-Marcoux
- Isabelle Delorme
- Emmanuëlle
- Marc-André Hamelin
- Christopher Jackson
- Kaya (Francis Martin)
- Yves Lapierre
- Andrée Lescot
- Jeanne Renaud
- Rosette Renshaw
- Nicole Rodrigue
- Aleksi Campagne

== Music Publishing division ==
The École de musique Vincent-d'Indy publishes and distributes its own line of educational materials for its curriculum in cooperation with the Coopérative Vincent d'Indy. The Coop is the school bookstore as well as distributor of their educational publications.
