= Bräunlich =

Braunlich or Bräunlich is a German surname meaning "brownish". Notable people with the surname include:

- Friedrich Gustav Bräunlich (1800–1875), German physician on medical psychology
- Alice Braunlich (1888–1989), American classical philologist
- Erich Bräunlich (1892–1945), German orientist
- Egon Arno Bräunlich (1919–2001), German painter and pharmacist
- Helmut Braunlich (1929–2013), German-American violinist, composer and musicologist
- Hans Bräunlich (born 1940), German dramaturge
- Tom Braunlich (born 1958), American CCG designer
- René Bräunlich (born 1974), German engineer from Leipzig, a victim of the kidnapping in Iraq, 2006 along with Thomas Nitzschke
