= Joseph Fournier de Belleval =

Canadian singer

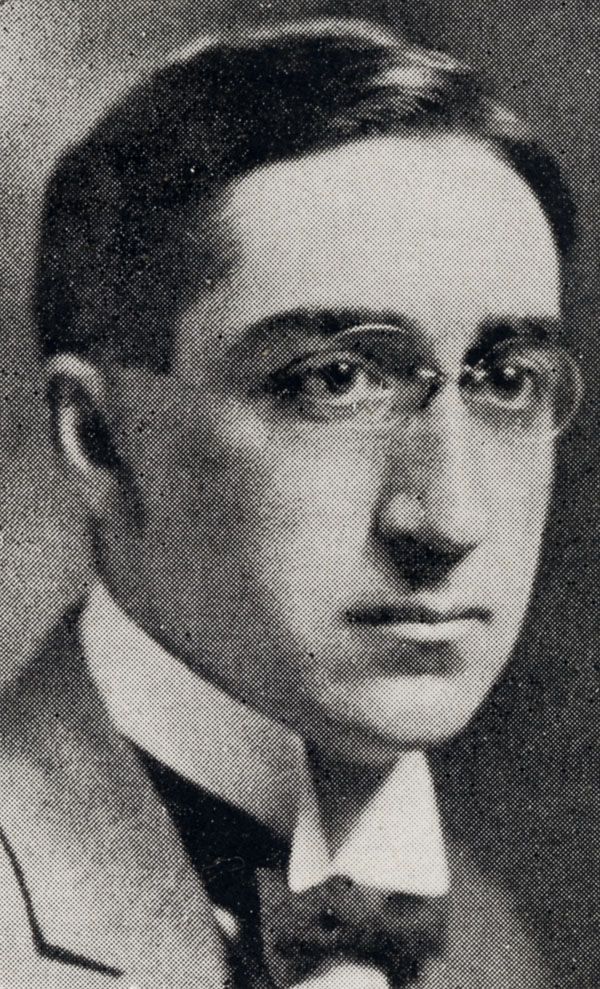

Joseph Fournier de Belleval Full name, Josephat Cyprien Justin Fournier-de Bellaval (1891 – 1945) was a French Canadian baritone, singing teacher and retailer. During the 1920s, he recorded over one hundred French language songs, primarily for the Quebec market.

== Career ==
Belleval was born in Contracoeur, Quebec, on September 24, 1891, and was baptised in the Church of Ste. Trinity, Contracoeur the next day. He made his singing debut in April 1917 in the production of L'Accordée de village directed by Omer Létourneau in the Auditorium de Québec. The following April he appeared in Robert Planquette's RIP, also at the Auditorium de Québec. In time, he began to pick up other roles. He played Macroton in Poisse's L'Amour médecin for the Knights of Columbus in Quebec city in February 1919. Apart from productions, he undertook singing performances for the Cercle Montcalm in November 1919 and the Cercle des Dames de Lévis in May 1920.

In December 1921 Belleval made his first recordings, travelling to New York to record with the Columbia Record Company. He made a second trip in February 1922, recording a total of 24 songs. The recordings were mostly contemporary Parisian songs. He returned there in February 1924 to record another dozen comparable songs. Belleval recorded twelve songs in Montreal with the Victor Talking Machine Company in 1925, and fifty more songs with Columbia between 1926 and 1928.

In 1924, Belleval starred in the Operetta Vive la Canadienne by Omer Létourneau. The company played the Knights of Columbus hall in Quebec city starting March 27, and in April the performances took place at the Palais Montcalm. He joined the Société canadienne d'opérette run by Honoré Vaillancourt, where he performed in Le Carillon de Saint-Arlon (1924), Rêve de valse (1924), La Cocarde de Mimi Pinson (1925), Ordre de l'empereur (1925), Les Cloches de Corneville (1926), Le Beau Voyage (1926), Le Jongleur de Notre-Dame (1928) and La Dernière Valse (1929).

In the 1930s Belleval retired from the music business, opening a retail shop in Contrecœur. There he created the Association des marchands détaillants. He died in March 1945.
