= Paul Triquet =

Canadian Army general (1910–1980)

Brigadier-General Paul Triquet VC CD
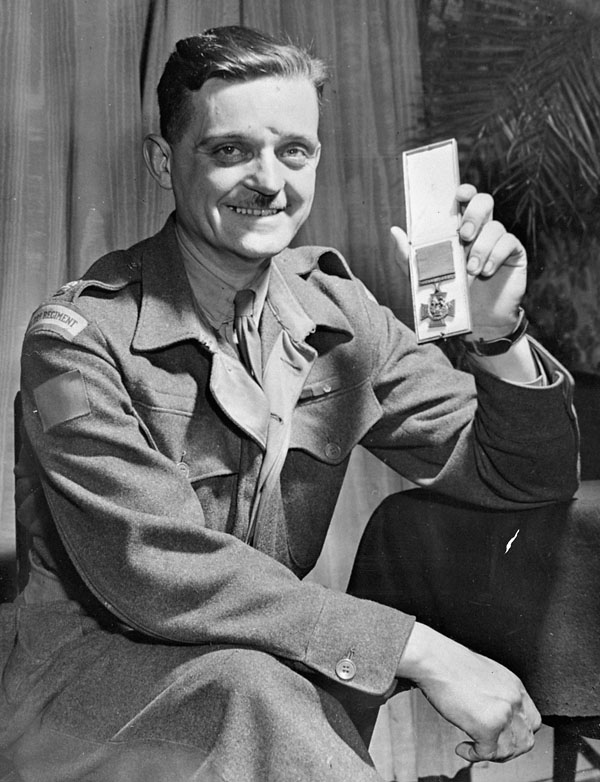
- Paul Triquet
- Born: 2 April 1910; Saint-Mathias-de-Cabano, Quebec
- Died: 8 August 1980 (aged 70); Quebec City, Quebec
- Burial place: Citadelle of Quebec
- Military career
- Allegiance: Canada
- Branch: Canadian Army
- Service years: 1927–1956
- Rank: Brigadier-General
- Units: Royal 22^{e} Régiment
- Conflicts: Second World War: Italian Campaign; Moro River Campaign
- Awards: Victoria Cross; Canadian Forces' Decoration; Knight of the Venerable Order of St John

Brigadier-General Paul Triquet VC, CD, (April 2, 1910 – August 8, 1980) was a Canadian recipient of the Victoria Cross (VC), the highest and most prestigious award for valour in the presence of the enemy that can be awarded to British and other Commonwealth forces. Triquet held the rank of captain at the time of his VC award and went on to achieve the rank of brigadier-general.

Triquet was the only Quebecer to be awarded the VC during the Second World War.

== Details ==
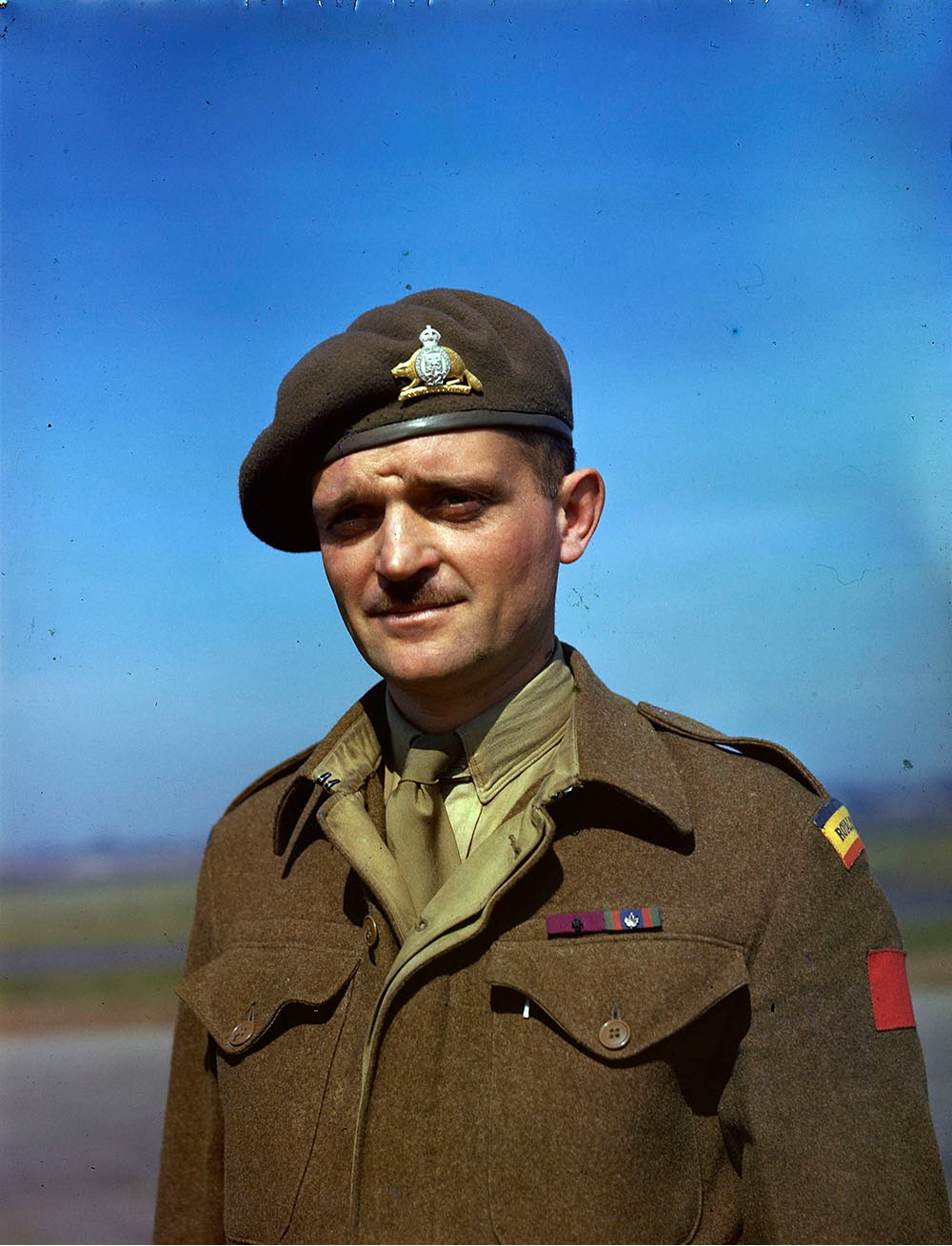
Major Paul Triquet c. 1944

Paul Triquet was a 33-year-old captain in the Royal 22^{e} Régiment (R22^{e}R), Royal Canadian Infantry Corps, during the Second World War when the following deed took place as part of the Moro River Campaign in Italy.

His VC citation reads: "On 14 December 1943 during the attack on Casa Berardi, Italy, when all the other officers and half the men of his company had been killed or wounded, Captain Triquet dashed forward and, with the remaining men, broke through the enemy resistance. He then forced his way on with his small force – now reduced to two sergeants and 15 men – into a position on the outskirts of Casa Berardi. They held out against attacks from overwhelming numbers until the remainder of the battalion relieved them, the next day. Throughout the action Captain Triquet's utter disregard for danger and his cheerful encouragement were an inspiration to his men."

== Memorials ==
A memorial plaque was placed at Mount Royal Crematorium, Montreal, Quebec, Canada. His ashes are interred in the regimental memorial of the R22^{e}R, Citadelle of Quebec. Triquet Island, off the west coast of British Columbia, is named in his honour. A statue of Triquet is one of 14 that comprise the Valiants Memorial in Confederation Square in Ottawa.

Mont Triquet is one of the peaks in the training area of CFB Valcartier.

== Medals ==
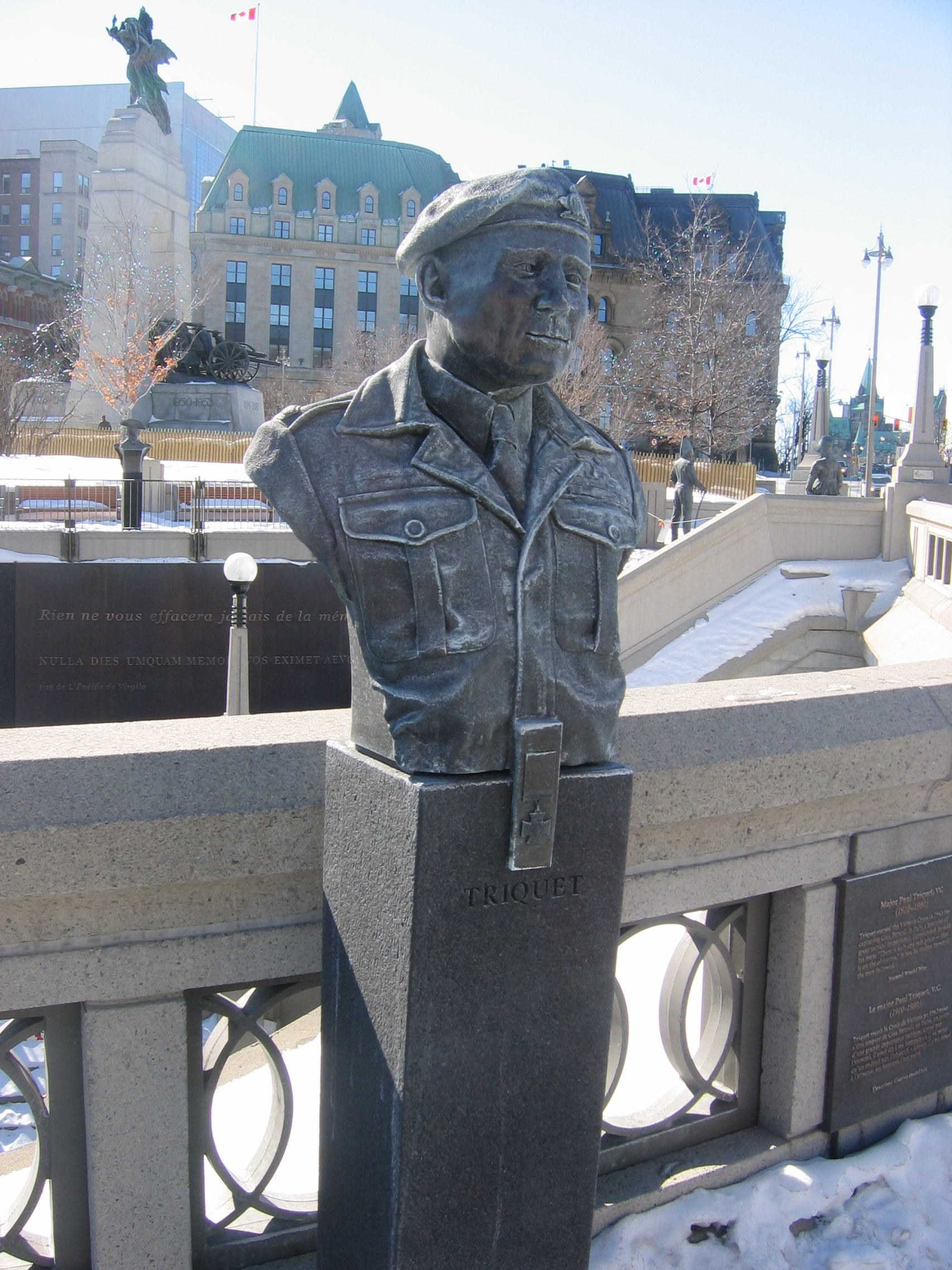
Statue of Paul Triquet in Ottawa, Ontario

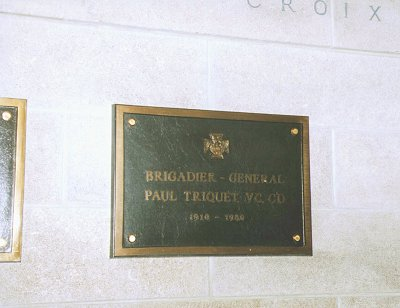
Memorial plaque at Mount Royal Crematorium

His medals are displayed at the Citadelle, but the VC is a replica of Triquet's.

Brigadier-General Triquet received the following awards:

- Victoria Cross
- 1939–1945 Star
- Italy Star
- Defence Medal
- Canadian Volunteer Service Medal with overseas service bar
- War Medal 1939–1945
- Queen Elizabeth II Coronation Medal
- Canadian Centennial Medal
- Queen Elizabeth II Silver Jubilee Medal
- Medal for Long Service and Good Conduct (Military)
- Canadian Forces' Decoration with bar
- Legion of Honour (France)
