= Omer Létourneau =

Canadian musician (1891–1983)

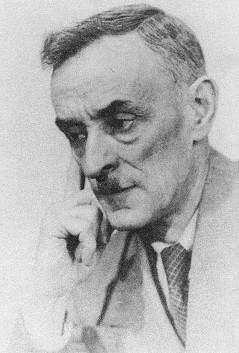

Joseph Hercule Omer Létourneau (13 March 1891 – 14 August 1983) was a Québécois pianist, organist, composer and orchestra conductor from Saint-Sauveur.

== Early life and education ==
Though born in Québec proper, Létourneau studied organ and piano with of Joseph-Arthur Bernier in Saint-Sauveur, Quebec.

== Career ==
Létourneau won the Prix d'Europe in 1913, and travelled to Paris, France to perform on piano and organ. At the beginning of World War I, he returned to Quebec and became organist of the St-Sauveur of Quebec Church, a position he held for many years.

In 1917 he directed the production of L'Accordée de village in the Auditorium de Québec in Quebec City which included performances from singers such as baritone Joseph Fournier de Belleval.

After the war he went once more to Paris to complete his studies, then returned to Quebec. He founded a magazine, La Musique, and opened a music store, La Procure musicale. During the 1930s he taught at l'Ecole de Music; one of his notable students was Edwin Bélanger. During this time he also led the Laurentian Quartet.

In 1981 he was the subject of a television documentary, M. Omer Letourneau: La Vie musicale a Quebec depuis trois generations.

== Personal life ==
Letourneau married Marie Coulombe, sister of pianist Clotilde Coulombe. He was the father of tenor, conductor, and opera director Jean Létourneau.

He later died in Québec city.
