= Françoys Bernier =

Canadian pianist, conductor, radio producer, arts administrator and music educator

Françoys Joseph Arthur Maurice Bernier (12 July 1927 – 3 February 1993) was a Canadian pianist, conductor, radio producer, arts administrator, and music educator. He served as the music director of the Montreal Festivals from 1956 to 1960 and was an active conductor and a producer for CBC Radio during the 1950s and early 1960s. He was the General Director of the Orchestre Symphonique de Québec from 1960 to 1966 and then the orchestra's Music Director from 1966 to 1968. He was also active as a teacher of conducting at a number of universities, notably serving as the first director of the Music Department at the University of Ottawa.

== Family background and education ==
Bernier was born into a prominent family of musicians in Quebec City. He was the son of cellist and music critic Maurice Bernier, the brother of cellist Pierre Bernier and pianist Gabrielle Bernier, and the nephew of pianist Gabrielle Bernier and of keyboardist and composer Conrad Bernier. His earliest musical education was with his grandfather, keyboardist and composer Joseph-Arthur Bernier.

Bernier received his general education from the Séminaire de Québec, where he also studied music from 1939 to 1947. From 1945 to 1950 he attended courses at the Conservatoire de musique du Québec à Québec, where he was a pupil of Françoise Aubut, Henri Gagnon, Hélène Landry, Ria Lenssens, and Father Alphonse Tardif. In 1949–1950 he pursued further studies at the Université Laval with Lucien Brochu and Marius Cayouette. He later studied music analysis and conducting with Sergiu Celibidache in Siena and Hermann Scherchen in Salzburg in 1962–1963 through grants awarded to him by the Canada Council.

== Career ==
In 1950 Bernier joined the teaching staff of College Mathieu in Gravelbourg, Saskatchewan, where he remained for over two years. During that time he also worked as the first program director of the local radio station CFRG when it opened in June 1952. He left Gravelbourg in 1953 to become a producer of music programs for Canadian Broadcasting Corporation in Montreal.

Working for the French-language side of the CBC, Bernier was particularly active with the CBC Radio program Premières during his first year with the organization. In 1954 he worked as a producer for the CBC Television programs Concerts pour la jeunesse and L'Heure du concert. He also produced several live programs of classical music, including performances of Igor Stravinsky's Histoire du soldat (1955), Maurice Ravel's L'enfant et les sortilèges (1956, 1957), Charles Gounod's Faust (1957), Giacomo Puccini's Madama Butterfly (1958), and Jules Massenet's Manon (1960), among others.

In 1956 Bernier was appointed music director of the Montreal Festivals, a post he remained in until 1960 when he became general director of the Orchestre Symphonique de Québec. In 1960 he conducted the orchestra in the world premiere of Roger Matton's Mouvement symphonique no. 1 (1960), and in 1963 he conducted them in the premiere of Serge Garant's Ouranos. After six years as general director, he succeeded Wilfrid Pelletier as the orchestra's principal conductor in 1966. He held that post for two years, during which time he championed contemporary works by Canadian and French composers, in particular those by Olivier Messiaen. He conducted the world premiere of Matton's Te Deum with the OSQ in 1967 and again for its European premiere in 1969 with the Office de Radiodiffusion Télévision Française. He also was a guest conductor with a number of French orchestras, including the Orchestre des Concerts Colonne and the Orchestre National Bordeaux Aquitaine.

From 1959 to 1964 Bernier worked on the faculty of the Université Laval where he taught conducting and directed the university choir. He concurrently worked as the assistant director of the Conservatoire de musique du Québec à Québec from 1960 to 1968. From 1973 to 1975 he was President of the Canadian Music Council. He was also a member of the board of directors of the Encyclopedia of Music in Canada. He was appointed the first director of the Music Department at the University of Ottawa in 1969, a post he held through 1976. He remained on the UO's faculty until 1992. In 1977 he founded le Domaine Forget, a summer arts festival and school for music, dance, and theatre. He served as the general and artistic director of the school up until his death in Quebec City in 1993 at the age of 65.

== Awards and honours ==
In 1992 Bernier was awarded the François Samson Prize and was honoured with an award from the Orchestre symphonique de Québec. In 1993 he was posthumously named a Chevalier of the National Order of Quebec and the University of Ottawa established a scholarship in his name. In 1996 Le Domaine Forget built a new concert hall which they named in his honour.
