= Maurice Bernier (journalist) =

Canadian journalist (1900–1990)

Maurice Bernier (17 April 1900 – 2 December 1990) was a Canadian journalist, cellist, and music critic. He wrote music criticism for the Quebec City newspaper L'Événement from 1922 to 1932. He then worked as a reporter stationed at the National Assembly of Quebec for the next four decades.

Born in Quebec City, Bernier was a member of a prominent family of Canadian musicians. His father was the organist Joseph-Arthur Bernier and he was the brother of pianist Gabrielle Bernier and composer and keyboardist Conrad Bernier. Three of his children became successful musicians: Françoys Bernier, Madeleine Bernier, and Pierre Bernier. He began his musical training with his father as a child. He studied the piano with his father and later was a pupil of Henri Gagnon on that instrument. From 1912 to 1920 he studied the cello with J.-Alexandre Gilbert and Paul Robitaille. In 1915 he became a member of the Quebec Symphony Orchestra under conductor Joseph Vézina. He played with the orchestra for about a decade but abandoned his professional music career in favour of his work as a writer. In 1978 he wrote several articles about the Quebec Symphony Orchestra in the year of the ensemble's 75th anniversary for Le Mois à Québec.

Bernier died in Quebec City 2 December 1990.
