= Simon Mailloux =

Canadian military officer (born 1983)

Simon Mailloux MSM CD
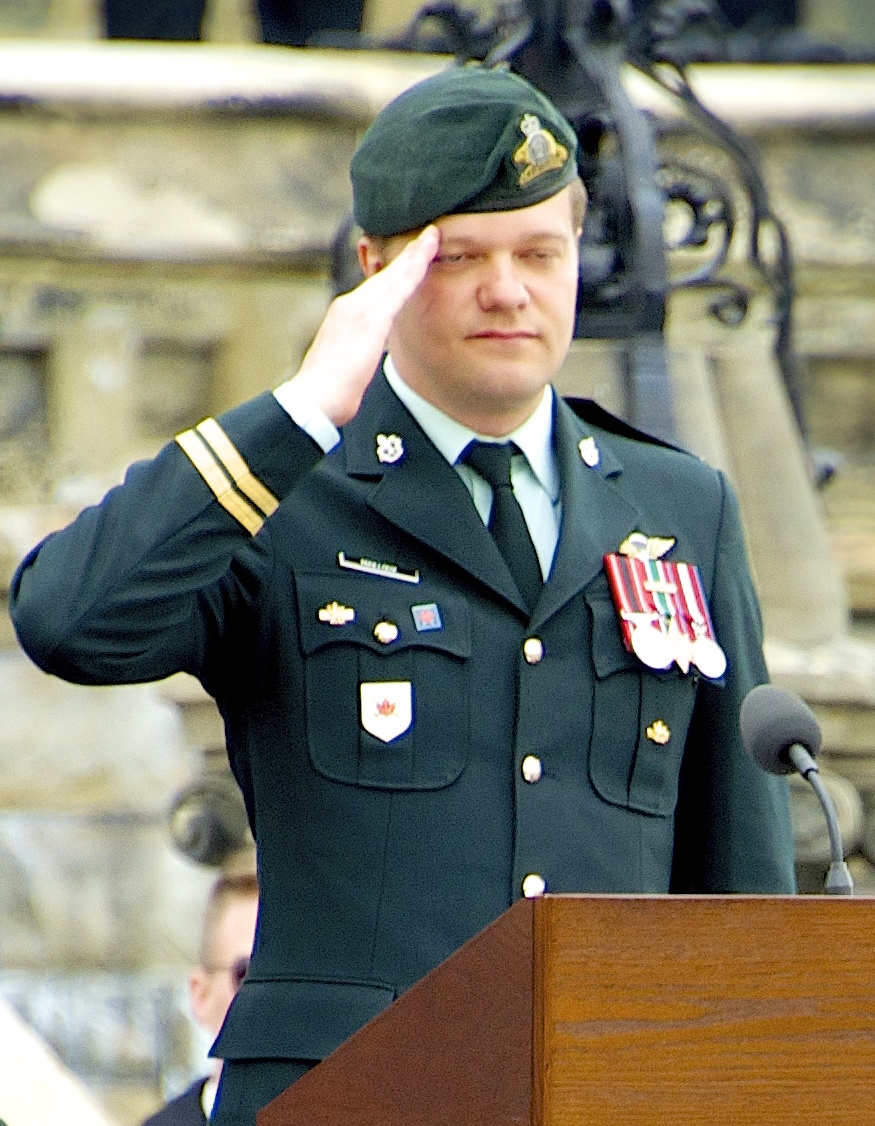
- Simon Mailloux
- Born: 2 November 1983 (age 42); Quebec City, Quebec, Canada
- Spouse: Kari Pries
- Military career
- Branch: Canadian Army
- Rank: Lieutenant-colonel
- Unit: Royal 22nd Regiment
- Conflicts: War in Afghanistan (2001–present)

Lieutenant Colonel Simon Mailloux, MSM, CD (born 2 November 1983) is an officer in the Canadian Armed Forces. He was injured in an Improvised Explosive Device (IED) incident in Afghanistan on 16 November 2007, resulting in the amputation of his left leg. In 2009, he returned to Afghanistan as part of Task Force Kandahar. Sources have described him as the first Canadian service member with an amputation to redeploy to a combat zone following such an injury.

== Early years ==
Mailloux was born in 1983 and raised in Quebec City, Quebec. He participated in the Royal Canadian Air Cadets as a youth. In 2001, he entered the Royal Military College of Canada and graduated in 2006 as an infantry officer. In 2005, he received an international exchange scholarship that supported research on the development of security institutions in Mali. He conducted research at the École de Maintien de la Paix and the Institut de Recherche sur le Développement de Bamako.

== Military career ==
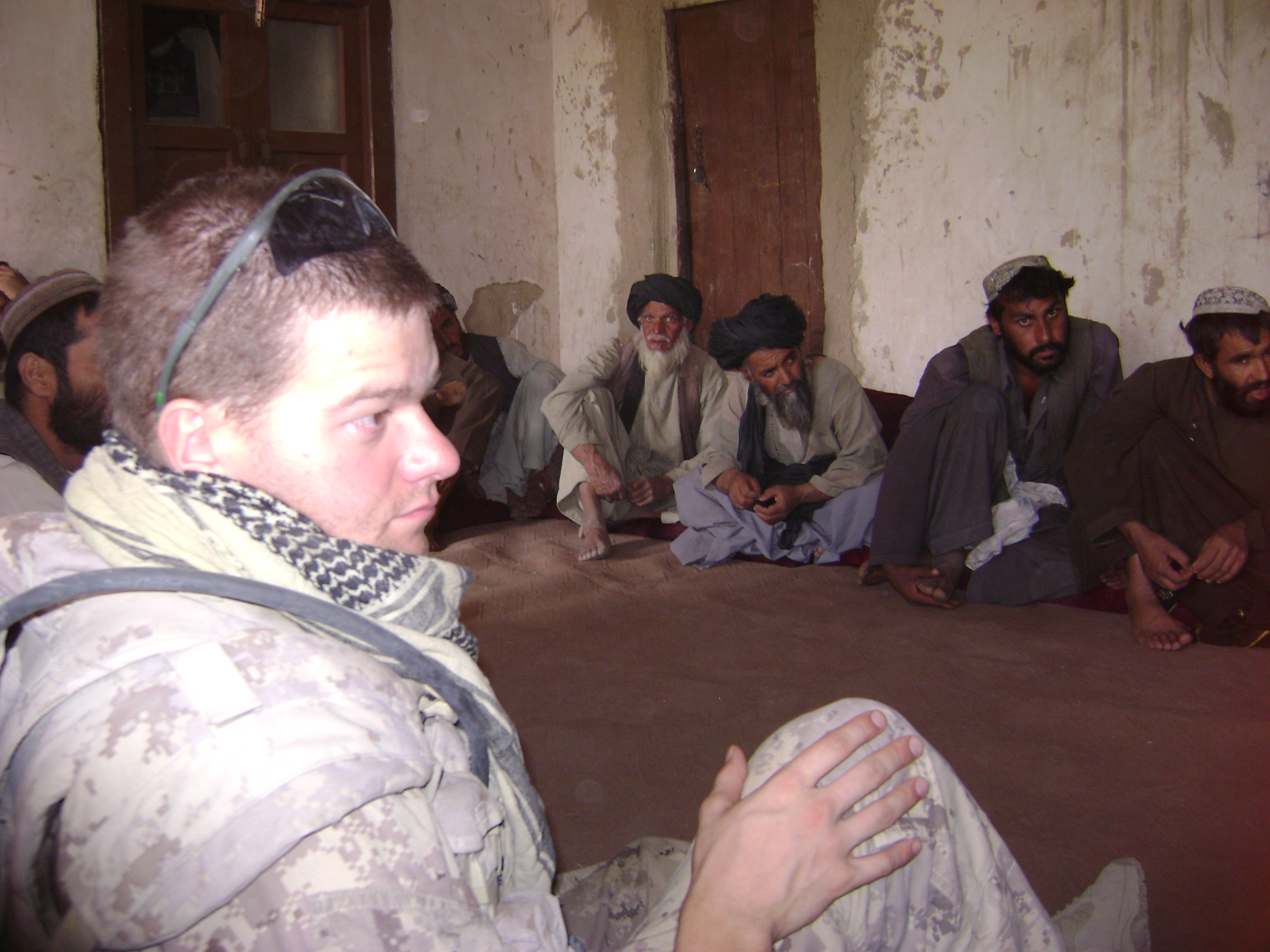
Mailloux in Afghanistan

Following graduation, Mailloux was posted to the 3rd battalion Royal 22^{e} Régiment in Valcartier, Quebec where he served as a platoon commander. He deployed to Afghanistan under Operation Athena. During that deployment, Cpl Simon Longtin, a member of his platoon, was killed during an engagement with insuregent forces. On 16 November 2007, Mailloux was seriously injured in an IED explosion that also killed two Canadian soldiers and an interpreter and wounded several others. After evacuation he underwent multiple surgeries and rehabilitation.

Following his recovery, Mailloux appeared in Canadian media discussing his experiences and issues relating to injured military personnel and veterans. In 2008, he served as Aide-de-Camp to the Governor Governor General of Canada at Rideau Hall. During that appointment, he supported official visits and ceremonial activities, including visits involving U.S. President Barack Obama and the Emperor and Empress of Japan.

=== Return to Afghanistan ===
In 2009, Mailloux was promoted to captain and assigned to Task Force Kandahar Headquarters. His planned return to Afghanistan received significant media coverage in Canada and abroad.

Priot to deployment, he was among the first recipients of the Sacrifice Medal, which was presented by the Governor General of Canada in November 2009. He subsequently completed a nine-month deployment in Afghanistan.

=== Post-Afghanistan service ===
After returning from Afghanistan, Mailloux attended the University of Glasgow before serving with the Canadian Armed Forces Counter-IED Task Force.

In 2013 he was posted to the 1st battalion Royal 22e Régiment as a company second in command. In 2014, he served as co-host of Canada's National Day of Honour ceremony marking the conclusion of Canada's mission in Afghanistan.

=== Invictus Games and continuing career ===
Mailloux held several appointments within the Royal 22e Régiment before being promoted to major in 2017 and assuming command of A Company 1st battalion Royal 22e Régiment. In 2016, he was named co-captain of Team Canada for the 2017 Invictus Games in Toronto, alongside Natasha Dupuis.

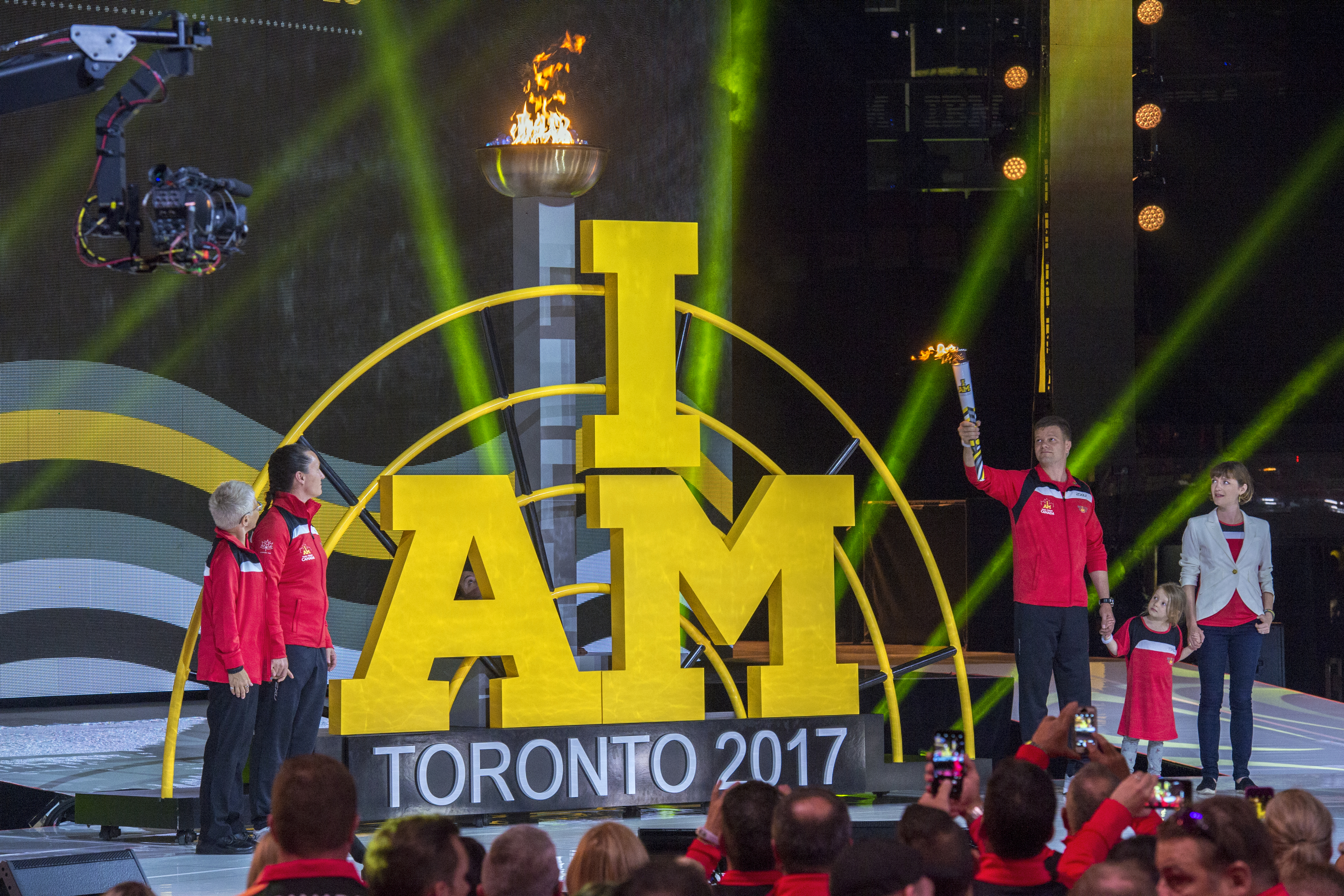
Lighting of the torch to open the 2017 Invictus Games

In 2018, after commanding his company through Exercise Maple Resolve, Mailloux deployed to Ukraine under Operations Unifier, the Canadian Armed Forces training mission supporting the Ukrainian Armed Forces. Following a series of staff appointments, he was promoted to lieutenant-colonel in 2021.

== Community and veterans' involvement ==
Mailloux has participated in Army Run events and has been involved with the Canadian Armed Forces' Soldier On program, which supports serving and former membres through sport and recreational activities.

== Honours and decorations ==
Mailloux received the following honours and decorations during his military career.

Ribbon	Description	Notes
	Meritorious Service Medal	2025
	General Campaign Star	South West Asia Ribbon; With "ISAF" Bar; 1 Clasp
	Queen Elizabeth II Diamond Jubilee Medal	Canadian Version of this Medal; 2012
	Canadian Forces' Decoration (CD)	
	Sacrifice Medal	
	Special Service Medal	
