= Georges-Émile Tanguay =

Canadian composer, organist, pianist, and music educator

Georges-Émile Tanguay (5 June 1893 – 24 November 1964) was a Canadian composer, organist, pianist, and music educator. An associate of the Canadian Music Centre, his compositional output is relatively small; consisting of 4 orchestral works, 4 chamber music pieces, 9 works for solo piano, 2 works for solo organ, and 4 choral works. The library at Université Laval holds many of his original manuscripts and his personal papers.

== Early life and education ==
Born in Quebec City, Tanquay earned a lauréat diploma from the Académie de musique du Québec where he was a pupil of Léon J. Dessane and Joseph-Arthur Bernier. He also studied with Arthur Letondal and Romain Pelletier in Montreal. From 1912 to 1914 he studied with Louis Vierne (organ) and Félix Fourdrain (harmony) in Paris. He then lived and worked in New York City where he studied the organ with Pietro Yon and Gaston Dethier.

Tanquay returned to Paris in 1920 to study with Vincent d'Indy at the Schola Cantorum. He remained in that city for the next five years studying under Georges Caussade (harmony and counterpoint), Édouard Mignan (organ), and Simone Plé-Caussade (piano).

== Career ==
Tanguay returned to Canada in 1925 to assume the post of organist at Église de l'Immaculée-Conception, Montréal. He remained there through 1945.

As an educator, Tanguay taught privately and at a number of institutions. In the 1930s he taught at the Conservatoire national de musique. He was one of the original faculty members at the Conservatoire de musique du Québec à Montréal when the school opened in 1943. He later taught harmony and organ at the Université de Montréal. Many of his students had musical careers, including musicians Léon Bernier, Maurice Blackburn, Marcel Laurencelle, Gilberte Martin, Marcelle Martin, Magdeleine Martin, Lucien Martin, André Mérineau, Renée Morisset, and Micheline Tessier.

His works continued to be performed after his death: in 2012 his "Deuz pieces pour orchestre" was performed by the Newfoundland Symphony Orchestra.

In 2018, to mark the Canadian Sesquicentennial, a performance of Tanguay's Pavane was recorded by the Symphonova Orchestra.
