= Joseph-Arthur Bernier =

Joseph-Arthur Bernier (French pronunciation: [ʒozɛf aʁtyʁ bɛʁnje]; 19 March 1877 – 28 April 1944) was a Canadian organist, pianist, composer, and music educator. Born in Lévis, Quebec, he was the senior member of a prominent family of musicians from Quebec City. He is the father of pianist Gabrielle Bernier, cellist Maurice Bernier, and composer and keyboardist Conrad Bernier, and the grandfather of musicians Françoys Bernier, Madeleine Bernier, and Pierre Bernier. His compositional output includes 4 masses, several motets, pieces for solo organ, a Berceuse for violin, a Pastorale for oboe, a Cantilène for cello, and a Mazurka for piano.

Bernier was a pupil of Gustave Gagnon and Philéas Roy in Quebec City, and Alexandre Guilmant and Félix Fourdrain in Paris. He served as organist at several churches in Quebec City, including St-Sauveur Church (1892–1908), Notre-Dame-de-Jacques-Cartier Church (1908–17), and St-Jean-Baptiste Church (1917–1944). He also gave recitals throughout the United States and Canada during the first two decades of the 20th century. He was president of the Académie de musique du Québec in 1910-11 and 1912–13, and taught on the music faculty at Université Laval from 1922 to 1944. His notable students include Clotilde Coulombe, Rolland-G. Gingras, Omer Létourneau, and Georges-Émile Tanguay.
