= Clotilde Coulombe =

Canadian pianist (1892–1985)

Clotilde Coulombe (4 April 1892 – 13 May 1985) was a Canadian pianist and Roman Catholic nun. She was the sister-in-law of musician Omer Létourneau.

== Life and career ==
Born in Quebec City, Coulombe was a student of pianist Joseph-Arthur Bernier. In 1911 she was the first recipient of the Prix d'Europe study grant. This prize enabled her to pursue further studies in Paris with Lucien Berton (voice), Alfredo Casella (piano), Camille Chevillard (chamber music), Alfred Cortot (piano), and Félix Fourdrain (harmony).

After her return to Canada in 1914, Coulombe spent a year performing as a concert pianist and was also active as a music educator. She then entered a religious order in Quebec and devoted several years to religious life. Ill health eventually forced her to return to public life and, after her recovery, she married Dr Gaston Ouellette. She died in Saint-Michel, Quebec at the age of 93.
