= Conrad Bernier =

French-Canadian musician and conductor

- Born: 9 May 1904; Quebec City, Canada
- Died: 7 November 1988 (aged 84); Washington, DC, U.S.
- Occupations: French-Canadian organist, composer, and teacher.

Conrad Bernier (9 May 1904 – 7 November 1988) was a French-Canadian organist, composer, conductor and teacher. For many years he was a professor at the Catholic University of America in Washington, D.C.

== Early life and education ==
Born into a family of musicians in Quebec City, Bernier was the brother of pianist Gabrielle Bernier and cellist/journalist Maurice Bernier, and the uncle of musicians Françoys Bernier, Madeleine Bernier, and Pierre Bernier. His first teacher was his father Joseph-Arthur Bernier, who introduced him to solfège, organ, and piano. He continued his keyboard studies with Berthe Roy, and became proficient enough to inaugurate the organ of the church at Bienville when he was 13 years of age. The following year he performed on the organ of St-Sacrement Church in Quebec City. In this church he served from 1920 to 1923 as principal organist, while he was also assistant organist at St-Jean-Baptiste.

In 1923 Bernier won the Prix d'Europe to study organ in Paris. There he studied 1923–1926, taking piano with Sylvia Hérard and Simone Plé-Caussade, Music Theory with Georges Caussade (theory), and organ with the well-known organist from Bordeaux, Joseph Bonnet, for whom he also substituted at the organs of the church of St-Eustache. In 1962 he was awarded a Doctorate of Music from St. Francis, Loretto, Pennsylvania.

== Professional career ==
In 1926 he returned to Canada for a concert tour, after which he was organist at the Church of the Visitation in Detroit for several months. His next appointment was at the Catholic University of America in Washington, D.C., where he became director of the Organ Department in 1927. He returned to Canada from time to time to teach courses between 1943 and 1947 and to give recitals and performances for the Casavant Society.

In Washington Bernier was organist at the church of Ste. Anne (1935–1969), artist in residence at The Shrine of the Most Blessed Sacrament, and also became the regular organist of the Basilica of the Shrine of the Immaculate Conception. During World War II, he was one of the three interim conductors of the Cathedral Choral Society at Washington National Cathedral.

Bernier continued to teach at Catholic University until he was named Professor Emeritus in 1974. In 1975 he played the organ for a recording of flute and organ music with Lambros Callimahos.

Bernier he continued teaching counterpoint, fugue, and composition and [organ] until the eve of his death on 7 November 1988. Among his students were Don Shirley, Helmut Braunlich, Haig Mardirosian, and Dieter Lehnhoff.

== Books ==
- Harmonie moderne
- Traité d'improvisation à l'orgue (1962)
- Organ Method/Méthode d'orgue (Gregorian Institute of America, GIA, Toledo, Ohio, 1962).

== Selected compositions ==
- Croquis petit-capiens (Édition Belgo-Canadienne)
- Variations et fugue for two pianos
- Esquisse and Prière for organ
- Réverie for organ
- Mass for mixed-voice choir and two organs
- Two songs, 'Les Colombes' and 'Les Berceuses';
- Motets, published mainly by Quebec City's Procure générale de musique.
