= 3rd Canadian Light Infantry Regiment =

- Active: 10 September 2026–Present
- Country: Canada
- Branch: Canadian Army (2026-Present)
- Type: Light Infantry
- Role: Rapid deployment
- Size: 3 battalions
- Part of: 1st Canadian Division (2026-Present)
- Garrison/HQ: Garrison Petawawa

The 3rd Canadian Light Infantry Regiment is a Canadian military unit that was formed in 2026.

== History ==
The 3rd Canadian Light Infantry Regiment was formed on 10 September 2026 during a restructuring of the Canadian Armed Forces. It is attached to the 1st Canadian Division. The regiment is headquartered at Garrison Petawawa. Despite being designated as a regiment, its size and structure within the 1st Canadian Division is closer to that of a Brigade. The Government of Canada also described the function of the 3rd Canadian Light Infantry Regiment as being similar to that of a brigade, with the purpose of this being to provide the 1st Canadian Division with a rapid deployment force that could be deployed anywhere it's needed.

== Structure ==
- 3rd Canadian Light Infantry Regiment
  - 3rd Battalion, Royal Canadian Regiment
  - 3rd Battalion, Princess Patricia's Canadian Light Infantry
  - 3rd Battalion, Royal 22^{e} Régiment

== Utility for Future Canadian Amphibious Operations ==
This regiment has the potential to provide the marine infantry required for Canadian amphibious operations as it "... resembles almost completely the conceptual paratroop/landing force capability that was described in Canadian Army Journal 19.2 (2021), pp 70-75 and foreshadowed in [Canadian Naval Review] CNR 16.1 (2020), p 33. The only difference between the two may be the amount of staff and signals support available to the new regimental headquarters."
