= Commander-in-Chief Unit Commendation =

- Commander-in-Chief Unit Commendation pennant
- Awarded for: Extraordinary deed or activity of a rare high standard in extremely hazardous circumstances
- Description: Gold-tone bar with the vice-regal lion in full colour
- Country: Canada
- Presented by: Commander-in-Chief of Canada
- Eligibility: Unit or sub-unit of the Canadian Armed Forces (CAF) or similar organization of a foreign armed force working with or in conjunction with the CAF
- Established: 2002

Highlights
- Total recipients: 8

The Commander-in-Chief Unit Commendation (French: Mention élogieuse du commandant en chef à l'intention des unités) is a Canadian award given to military units for "an extraordinary deed or activity of a rare high standard in extremely hazardous circumstances".

Not only Canadian military units are eligible; Commonwealth and foreign units are also eligible if the deed occurred while serving alongside Canadian forces.

== Recipients ==
Established in 2002, the commendation has been issued eight times:

- 1st Battalion Royal 22^{e} Régiment Battle Group, for actions in Sarajevo in 1992 (joint operation with N Company 3rd Battalion Royal Canadian Regiment (RCR) and combined headquarters from both RCR and Royal 22^{e} Régiment)
- 3rd Battalion Princess Patricia's Canadian Light Infantry Battle Group, for actions in Afghanistan in 2002
- 2nd Battalion Princess Patricia's Canadian Light Infantry Battle Group, for actions in the Former Yugoslavia in 1993
- 1st Battalion Princess Patricia's Canadian Light Infantry Battle Group, for actions in Afghanistan in 2006
- 1st Battalion The Royal Canadian Regiment Battle Group, for actions in Afghanistan in 2006
- 3rd Battalion Royal 22^{e} Régiment Battle Group, for actions in Afghanistan in 2007 and 2008
- 1st Battalion, 3rd Special Forces Group (US Army), and US Air Force attachments, for actions in Afghanistan in 2006
- A special operations task force on a rotation of Operation Impact in Iraq for their direct support to host nation forces, in 2016.

== Insignia ==
The insignia of the commendation is a gold-tone bar overlaid with the crest from Canada's royal arms, which is used as the heraldic badge of the governor general and commander in chief. This insignia is worn on the left, right or both breasts of ceremonial, mess and service dress uniforms.

Members who were serving with the unit during the commended actions wear the insignia on the left breast. Current members of the commended unit wear the insignia on the right breast, and those who were members both currently and at the commended action wear it on both breasts.

The recipient units can fly the commendation pennant in perpetuity. This pennant is a rectangular flag, divided vertically into dark blue, red and sky blue sections, with the crest from the royal arms centred. The heraldic blazon is Tierced in pale azure, gules and bleu celeste, the crest of the royal arms of Canada (on a wreath argent and gules a lion passant guardant or imperially crowned proper and holding in the dexter paw a maple leaf gules).
