= Félix Fourdrain =

French organist and composer (1880–1923)

Félix Fourdrain (3 February 1880 - 23 October 1923) was a French organist and composer. He is chiefly known for his operas. Many of them were written in collaboration with librettists and poets Arthur Bernède and Paul de Choudens; the best of which are La Glaneuse (Grand Théâtre de Lyon, 1909), Madame Roland (Théâtre des Arts de Rouen, 1913), and Vercingétorix (Opéra de Nice, 1912). His masterpiece, La légende du Point d'Argentan, premiered at the Opéra-Comique in Paris in 1903.

Born in Nice, Fourdrain had his earliest musical training at the Ecole de Musique Classique et Religieuse (L'École Niedermeyer) in Paris. He then studied with Alexandre Guilmant and Charles-Marie Widor at the Conservatoire de Paris where he was awarded a premiere prix for organ performance in 1900. He was appointed "organiste titulaire" at the Sainte-Elisabeth-de-Hongrie church in Paris and worked there between 1900 and 1905 approximately, publishing "Improvisations", a collection of organ compositions. He pursued further studies in music composition with Jules Massenet, who became his close friend and mentor. He also took on his own students, including Joseph-Arthur Bernier, Clotilde Coulombe, and Georges-Émile Tanguay. He died in Paris at the age of 43.
