= Royal 22e Régiment =

Infantry regiment of the Canadian Army

Royal 22nd Regiment
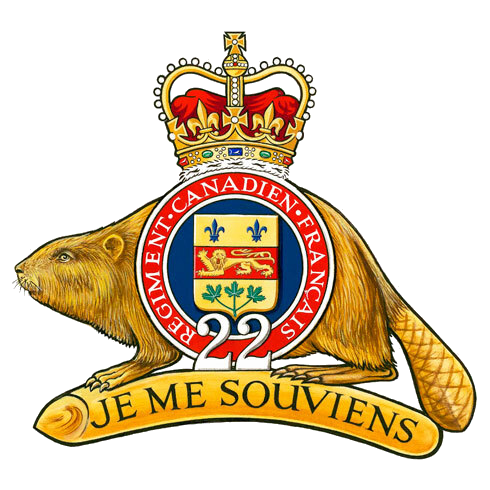
- Badge of the regiment
- Founded: 4 June 1869
- Country: Canada
- Branch: Canadian Army
- Type: Line infantry
- Role: Mechanized infantry (two battalions); Light role infantry/paratroop (one battalion); Light infantry (two battalions)
- Size: five battalions
- Part of: Royal Canadian Infantry Corps
- Garrison/HQ: Headquarters: Quebec City; 1st Battalion: Valcartier; 2nd Battalion: Valcartier; 3rd Battalion: Valcartier; 4th Battalion: Laval; 6th Battalion: Saint-Hyacinthe
- Nickname: "Van Doos"
- Motto: Je me souviens (French for 'I remember')
- Colors: Scarlet with blue facings (full dress and mess dress)
- March: Quick: "Vive la Canadienne"; Slow: "Marche lente du Royal 22^{e} Régiment: La Prière en famille"
- Mascot: Goat named Batisse XII
- Engagements: First World War; Second World War; Korean War; War in Afghanistan
- Decorations: Commander-in-Chief Unit Commendation: 1st Bn R22^{e}R Battle Group; Commander-in-Chief Unit Commendation: 3rd Bn R22^{e}R Battle Group
- Battle honours: See § Battle honours

Commanders
- Colonel-in-chief: Vacant
- Colonel of the regiment: Lieutenant-General Marc Lessard
- Notable commanders: Jean Victor Allard

Insignia
- Plume: Red, left side of bearskin
- Abbreviation: R22^{e}R

The Royal 22nd Regiment (Note: This is a literal translation of the regiment's name. The name Royal 22^{e} Régiment is used when referring to the regiment officially in either English or French.) (R22R; French: Royal 22^{e} Régiment) is an infantry regiment of the Canadian Army. Known colloquially in English as the Van Doos (representing an anglicized pronunciation of the French number twenty-two, vingt-deux) or in French as le Vingt-deuxième, the mostly francophone regiment comprises three Regular Force battalions, two Primary Reserve battalions, and a band, making it the largest regiment in the Canadian Army. The headquarters (French: quartier général) of the regiment is at the Citadelle of Quebec in Quebec City, also the site of the regimental museum, and all three of its regular battalions are stationed at Canadian Forces Base Valcartier in Saint-Gabriel-de-Valcartier, 15 kilometres (9.3 mi) outside of Quebec City. The regiment is a "British-style" infantry regiment that is the spiritual home and repository of customs and traditions for a number of battalions that do not necessarily serve together operationally. It serves as the "local" infantry regiment for the province of Quebec, where it draws most of its recruits; it is the largest regiment in the province, in terms of numbers.

== History ==
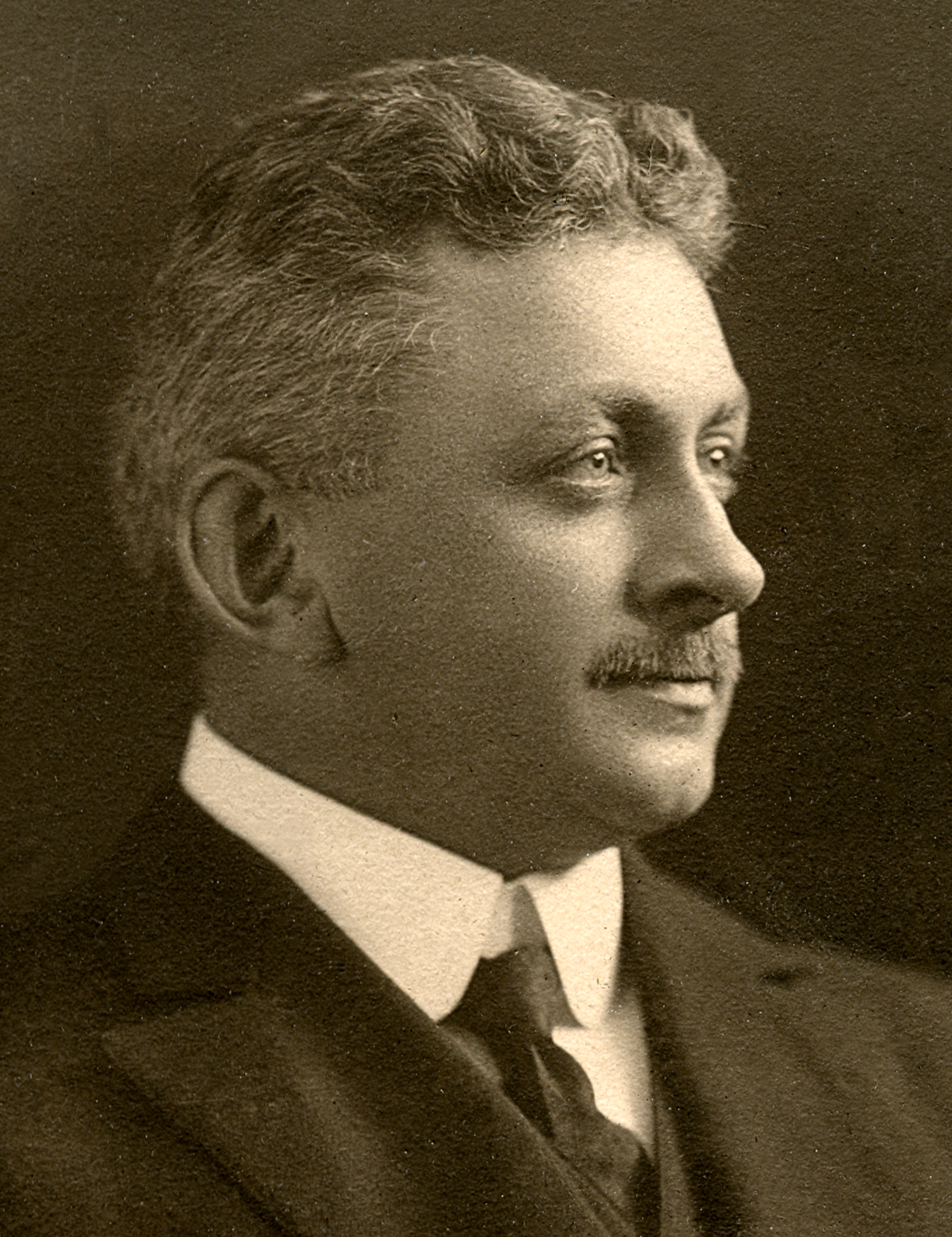
Arthur Mignault, founder of the Royal 22nd Regiment

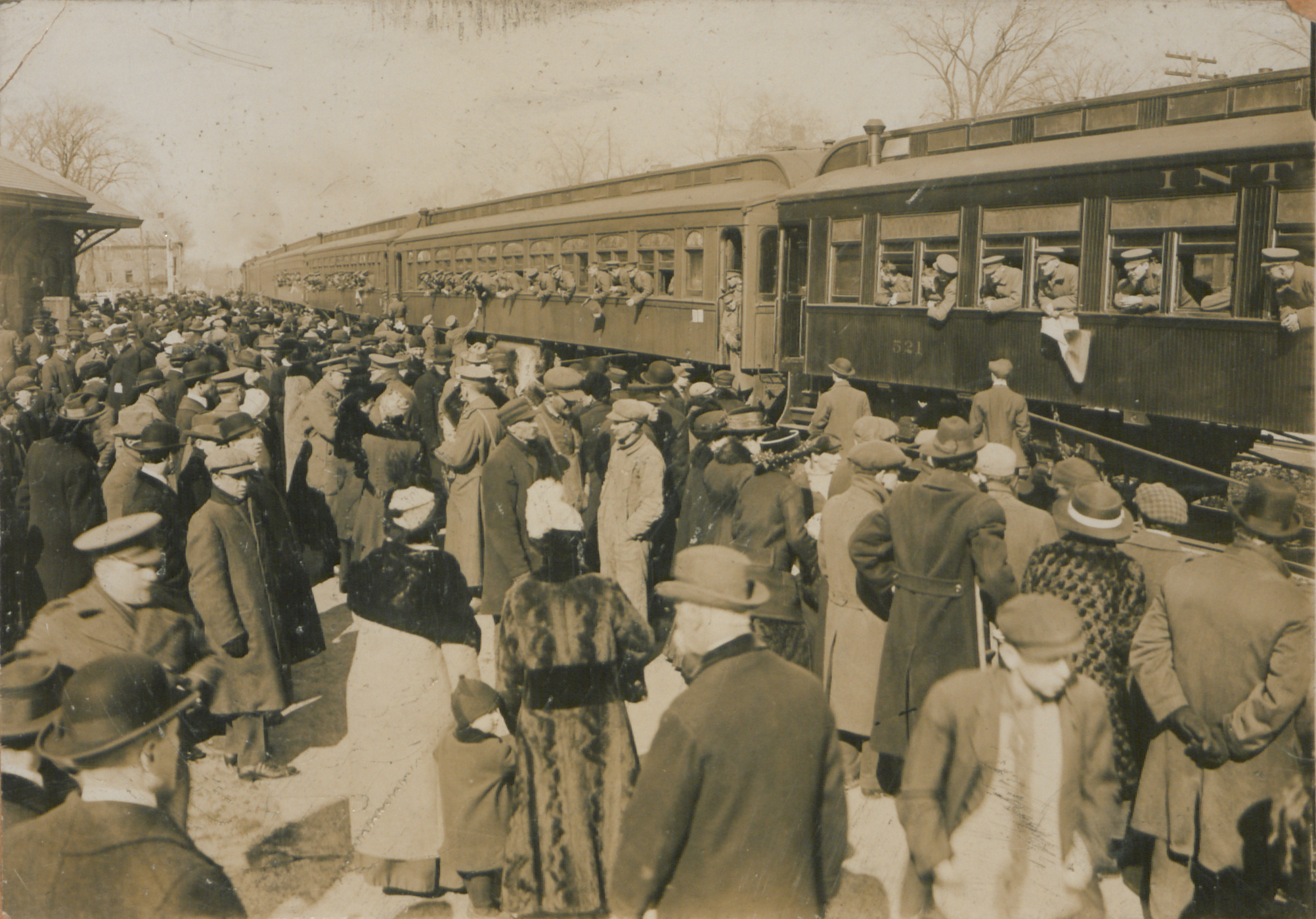
22nd Battalion leaving Quebec in 1915.

While the Royal 22^{e} Régiment commemorates the history and traditions of the Canadian Regiment of Fencible Infantry from the War of 1812 (also carrying resultant battle honours from the War of 1812), the modern ancestor of the regiment was formed in the early days of the First World War as part of the British Army, when volunteers from all over Canada were being massed for training at Valcartier, Québec, just outside Quebec City. The first contingent of 30,000 volunteers, which became the 1st Canadian Division of the Canadian Expeditionary Force, were grouped into numbered battalions, regardless of origin. The existing reserve regiments were not mobilized, due to the belief of the Defence Minister, Sam Hughes, that a new "efficient" structure was required. Once again the new structure did not contain French-speaking units, such as those that had existed in the reserves. Over 1000 French-Canadian volunteers were scattered into different English-speaking units. This was not an oversight as Ontario (Hughes's political base) was in the process of outlawing both the teaching of French, as well as in the French language in their school system (Regulation 17) The predictable outrage in French Canada created a lack of support for the war of "King and Country", perceived as a mechanism to entirely annihilate the Francophone community in Canada.

The second contingent was more logically based on battalions raised and trained in the various military districts in which they were recruited, but remained using an impersonal numerical basis (with the exception of those with a Highland or Irish identity). Considerable political pressure in Quebec, along with public rallies, demanded the creation of French-speaking units to fight a war many viewed as being right and necessary, despite Regulation 17 in Ontario.

Mignault communicated with Prime Minister Robert Borden, leading to the creation of the Royal 22^{e} Régiment

In September 1914, French Canadian pharmaceutical entrepreneur Arthur Mignault communicated with Prime Minister Robert Borden, advocating the formation of a solely French Canadian regiment. Mignault offered the government $50,000 to pursue this end. Borden had recently committed Canada to provide half a million soldiers to the Allied cause, and was just realising how demanding it would be to honour this promise. Borden eagerly accepted Mignault's proposal and accordingly, on 14 October 1914, the 22nd Battalion (French Canadian), CEF, was authorized. Mignault participated in the recruitment campaign, which resulted in a remarkable success; the ranks of the battalion were filled in less than a month. Arthur Mignault is as such considered the founder of the 22nd regiment.

The 22nd went to France as part of the 5th Canadian Brigade and the 2nd Canadian Division in September 1915, and fought with distinction in every major Canadian engagement until the end of the war. While other French speaking units were also created, they were all broken up upon arrival in France to provide reinforcements for the 22nd, which suffered close to 4000 wounded and killed in the course of the war. Two members of the 22nd were awarded the Victoria Cross in that war, Lieutenant Jean Brillant and Corporal Joseph Kaeble.

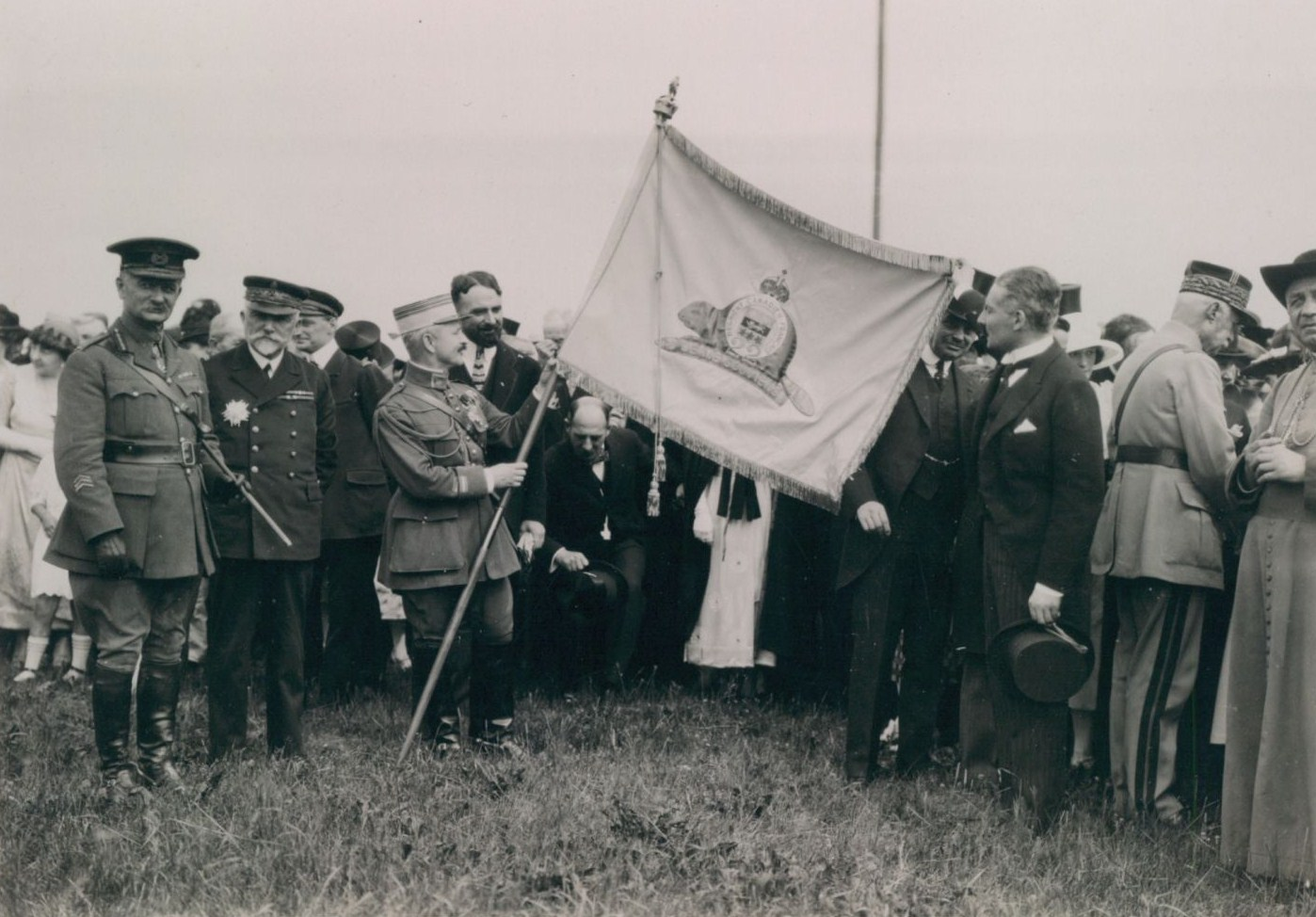
Émile Fayolle Marshal of France, presenting regimental colours to the Royal 22^{e} Régiment on the Plains of Abraham in Quebec City, 1921. This had been done at the request of Maréchal Foch who had been made honorary colonel of the regiment.

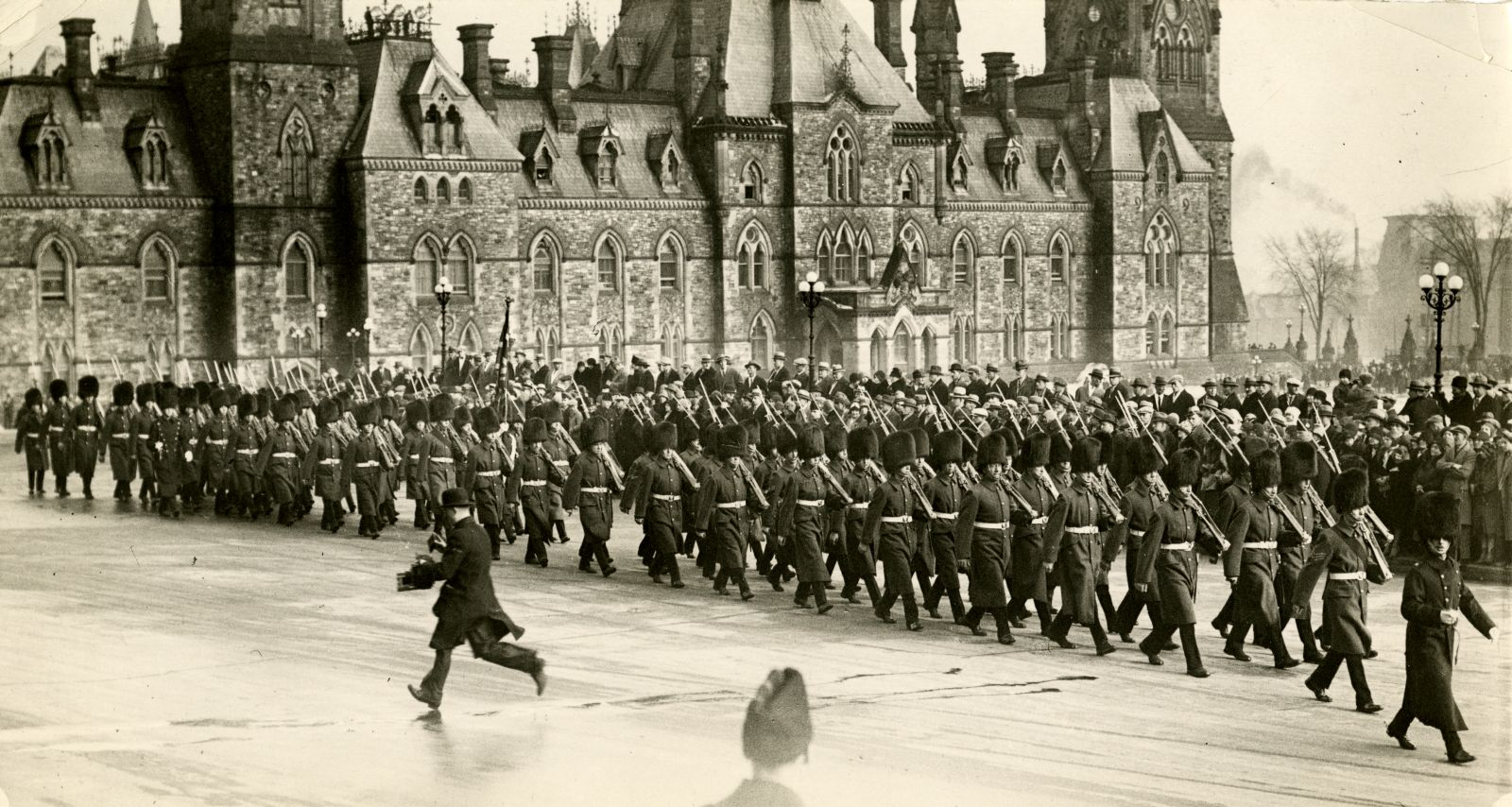
The Royal 22nd Regiment parading on Parliament Hill in Ottawa in 1927

After the war, the 22nd Battalion was disbanded on 20 May 1919, sharing the fate of other numbered battalions of the Canadian Expeditionary Force. However, in the post-war reorganizations of the army, public pressure, such as resolutions by the Legislative Assembly of Quebec as well as the City Council of Quebec City, demanded that a permanent French-language unit be created in the peace-time Regular Force, and accordingly a new regiment was created, made up of veterans of the 22nd Battalion, on 1 April 1920. Initially the regiment, which was given the guard of the Citadelle of Quebec, was simply the 22nd Regiment, but in June 1921 King George V approved the renaming of it as The Royal 22nd Regiment. In 1928, the anomaly of a French-language unit with an English name was resolved, and the regiment became the Royal 22^{e} Régiment in both languages. While in the Canadian Armed Forces, unit names are generally translated into the language of a text, traditional combat arms regiments are identified only in the single language of their troops, either English or French. However, the English version of the R22^{e}R is still seen occasionally, but strictly speaking it is incorrect; only "Royal 22^{e} Régiment" has been official in either language since 1928.

In 1940, the regiment became the first Francophone Canadian unit to mount the King's Guard in London and was the first of the three current Regular Force infantry regiments to do so.

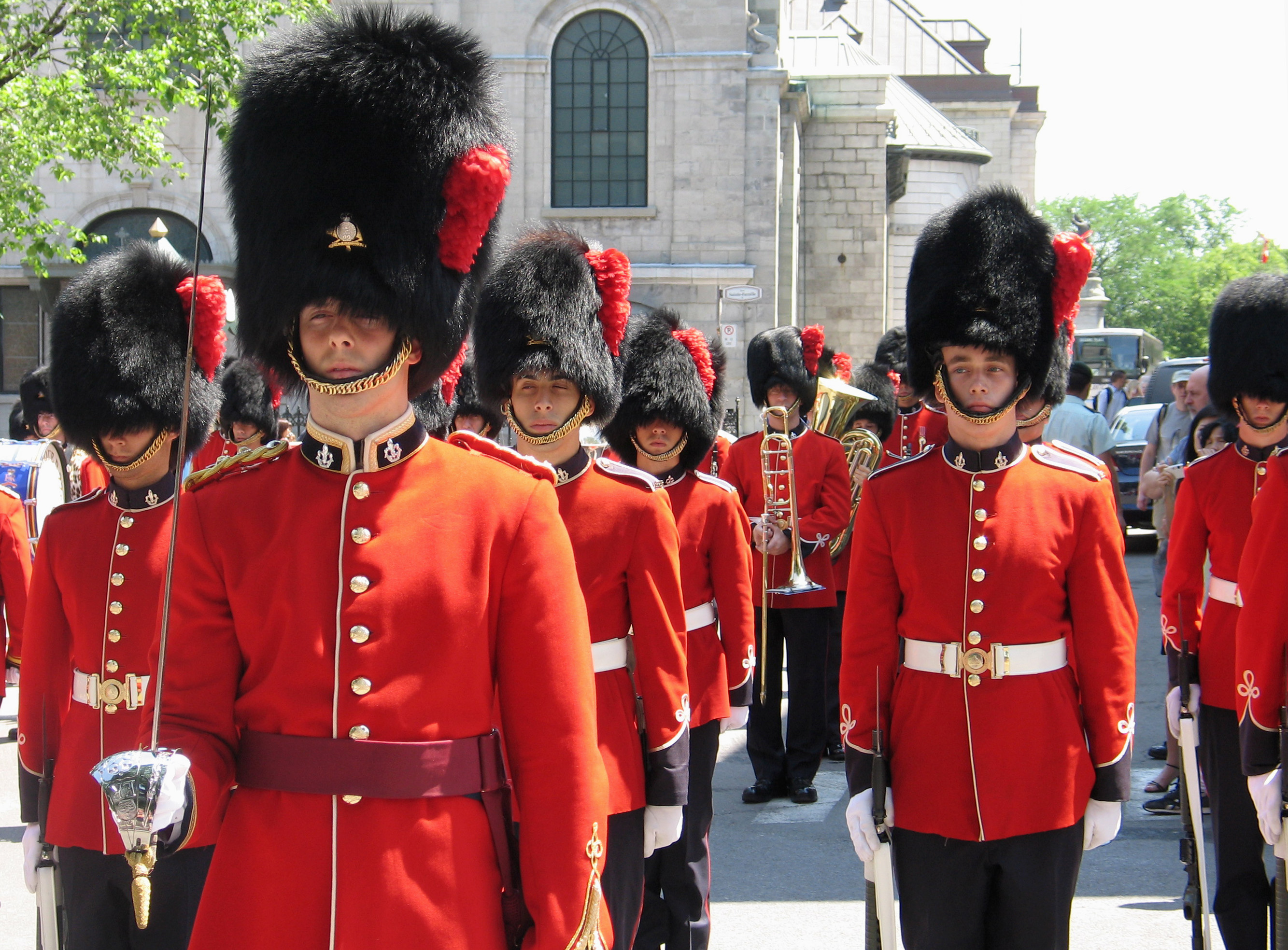
Soldiers of the Royal 22^{e} Régiment exercising the freedom of the city in front of Quebec City's City Hall, on 3 July 2006

In the Second World War, the regiment was part of the 3rd Canadian Infantry Brigade and the 1st Canadian Infantry Division and was involved in intense combat in Italy, (where Captain Paul Triquet earned the Victoria Cross) and later in the Netherlands and northwest Germany.

During the Korean War, 1951–1953, the regiment expanded to three battalions, each serving in turn as part of the Canadian brigade in the 1st Commonwealth Division. Thus the "Van Doos" represented one-third of Canada's infantry contingent throughout the war.

During the Cold War the regular battalions of the regiment served, in turn, in West Germany as part of 4 Canadian Mechanized Brigade Group, with the 1^{er} Battalion serving permanently from 1967 until the withdrawal in 1993.

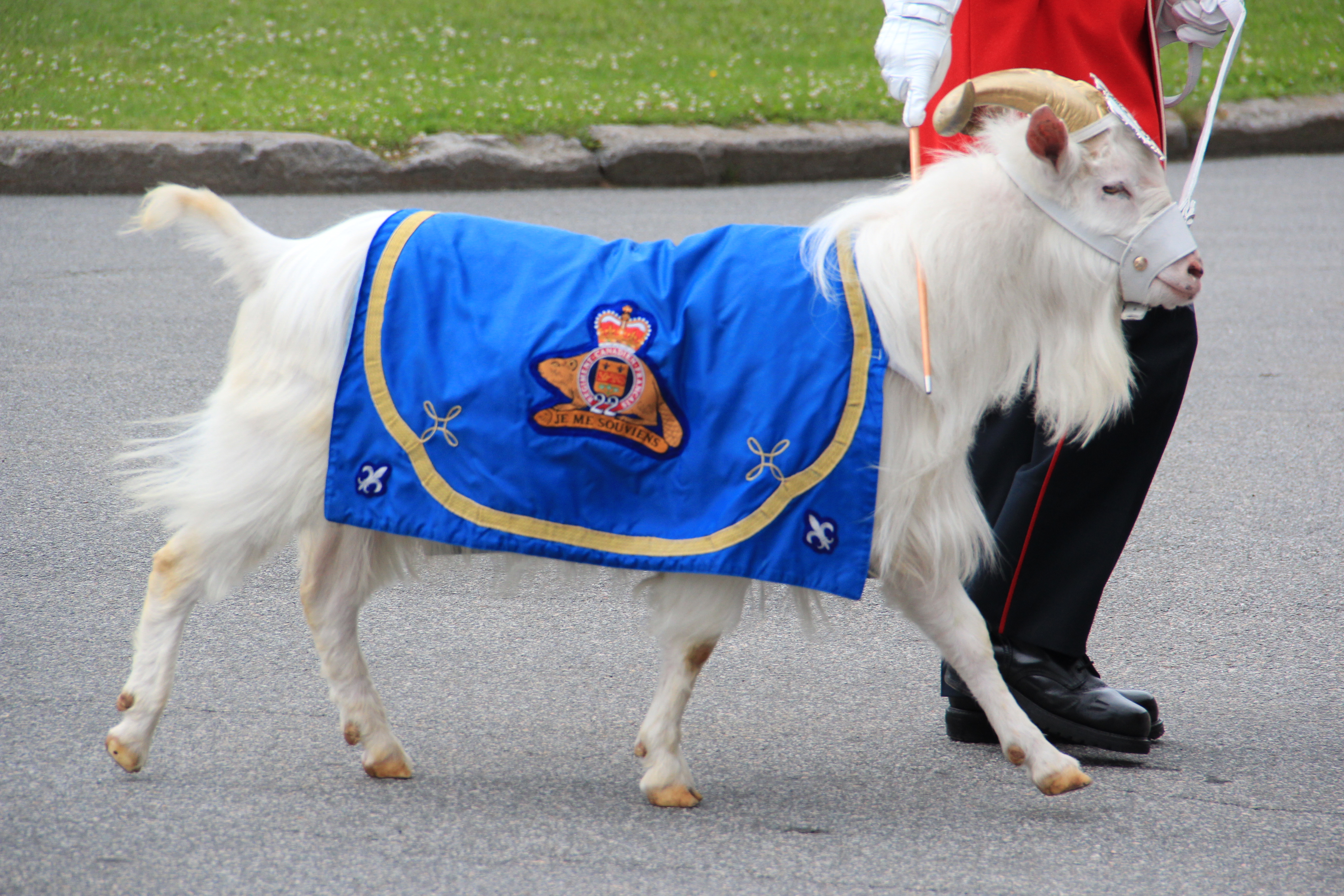
Batiste X, mascot of the regiment

The regiment also served during the Oka Crisis. During the life of the Canadian Airborne Regiment (1968–1995) the 1^{er} Commando was manned as a French-speaking sub-unit by soldiers of the Royal 22nd Regiment.

In the 1950s, the Canadian Army promoted a scheme of administratively associating reserve infantry regiments with a regular one. Although this project did not make much progress in most of the army, three reserve regiments did join the Van Doos, becoming battalions of the Royal 22^{e} Régiment:

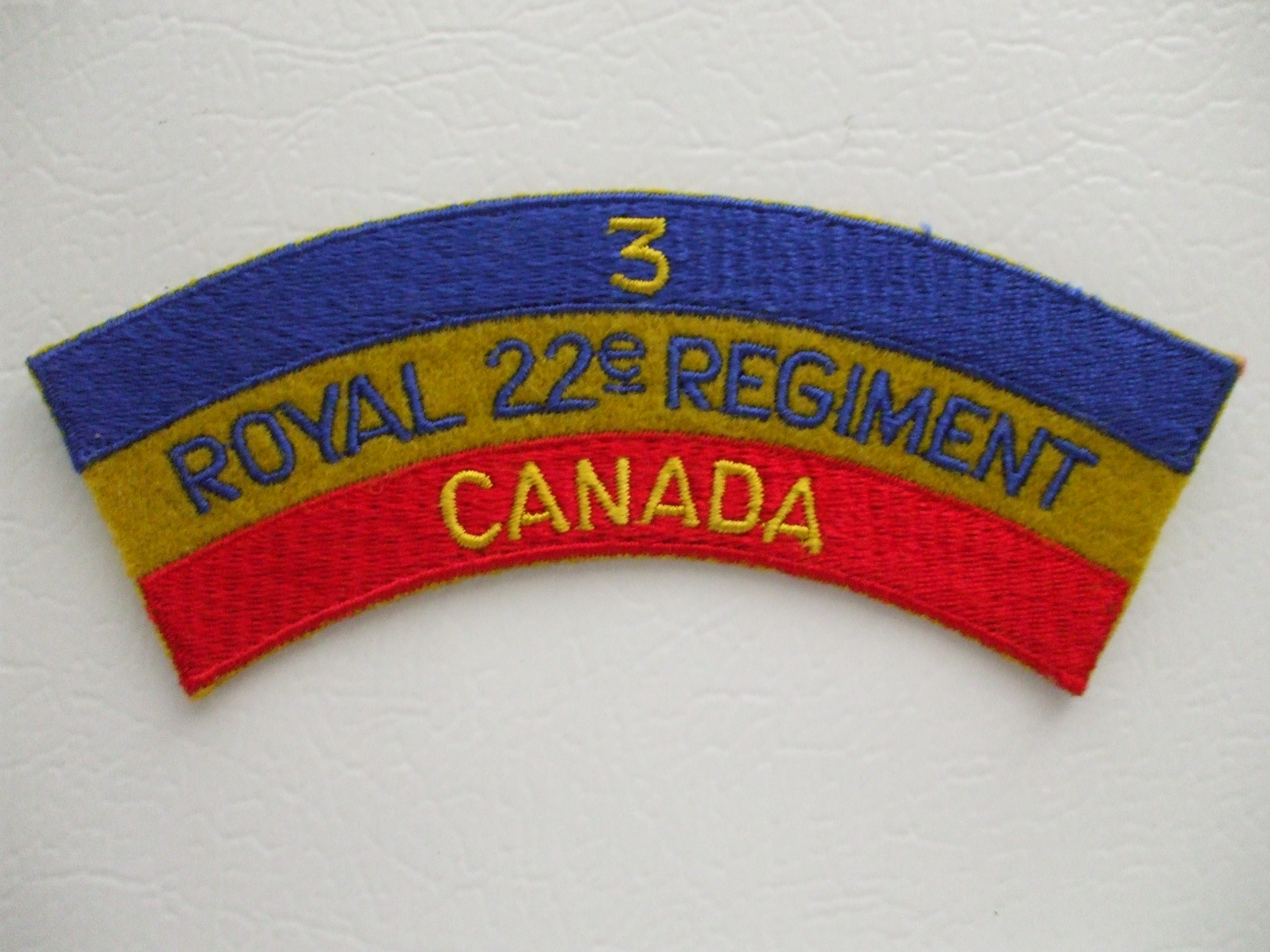
3rd Battalion, Royal 22^{e} Régiment CFB Valcartier

Old regiment name	Formed	New battalion name	Joined R22eR
Le Régiment de Châteauguay	1869	4th Battalion, Royal 22^{e} Régiment (Châteauguay)	1954
Fusiliers du S^{t.} Laurent	1869	Les Fusiliers du S^{t}-Laurent (5th Battalion, Royal 22^{e} Régiment)	1954 to 1968
Le Régiment de Montmagny	1869	Les Fusiliers du S^{t}-Laurent (5th Battalion, Royal 22^{e} Régiment)	1954 to 1968
Le Régiment de S^{t.}-Hyacinthe	1866	6th Battalion, Royal 22^{e} Régiment	1956

In the case of Les Fusiliers du S^{t}-Laurent, the battalion designation was in a subsidiary title, but it became nevertheless, administratively, part of the Royal 22^{e} Régiment. However, in 1968, Les Fusiliers du S^{t}-Laurent dropped the subsidiary title, and ended their administrative association with the R22^{e}R.

== Operational history ==
=== Fenian raids ===
The 64th Voltigeurs-de-Beauharnois were called out on active service from 9 to 29 April and from 24 to 31 May 1870. The battalion served on the Huntingdon frontier.

=== Great War ===
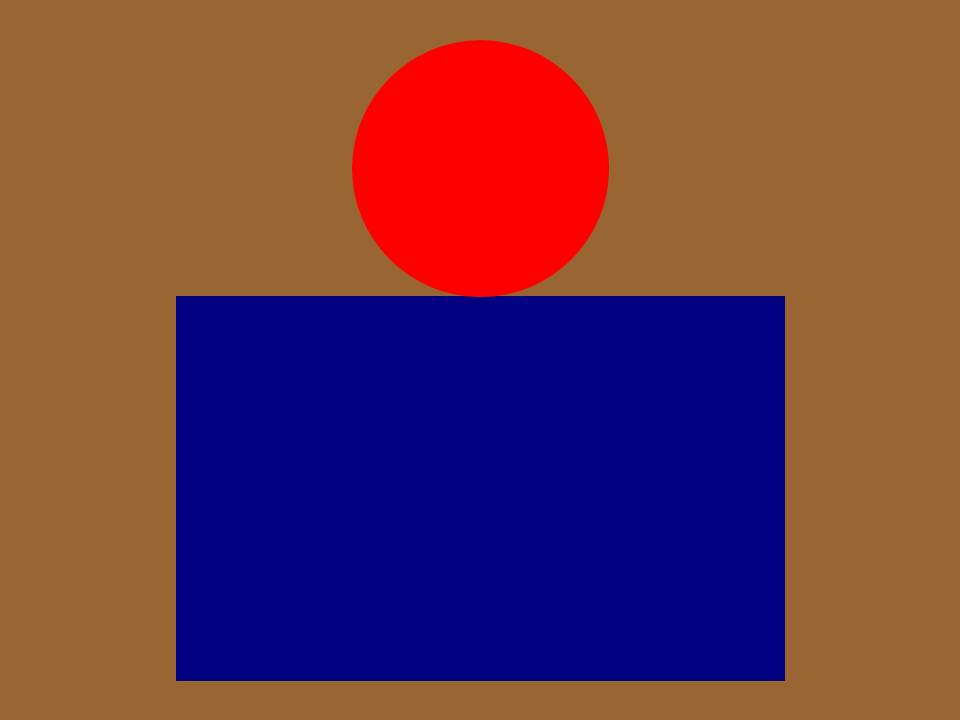
The distinguishing patch of the 22nd (French Canadian) Battalion, CEF.

Details of the 64th Châteauguay and Beauharnois Regiment were placed on active service on 6 August 1914 for local protective duty.

The 22nd (French Canadian) Battalion, CEF was authorized on 7 November 1914 and embarked for Great Britain on 20 May 1915. It disembarked in France on 15 September 1915, where it fought as part of the 5th Infantry Brigade, 2nd Canadian Division in France and Flanders until the end of the war. The battalion was disbanded on 15 September 1920.

=== Second World War ===
The Royal 22^{e} Régiment was placed on active service on 1 September 1939 as the Royal 22^{e} Régiment, CASF, embarked for Great Britain on 9 December 1939. The regiment landed in Sicily on 10 July 1943 and in Italy on 3 September 1943 as part of 3rd Brigade, 1st Canadian Infantry Division. On 16 March 1945, the regiment moved with the I Canadian Corps as part of Operation Goldflake to North-West Europe, where it fought until the end of the war. The overseas regiment was disbanded on 1 March 1946.

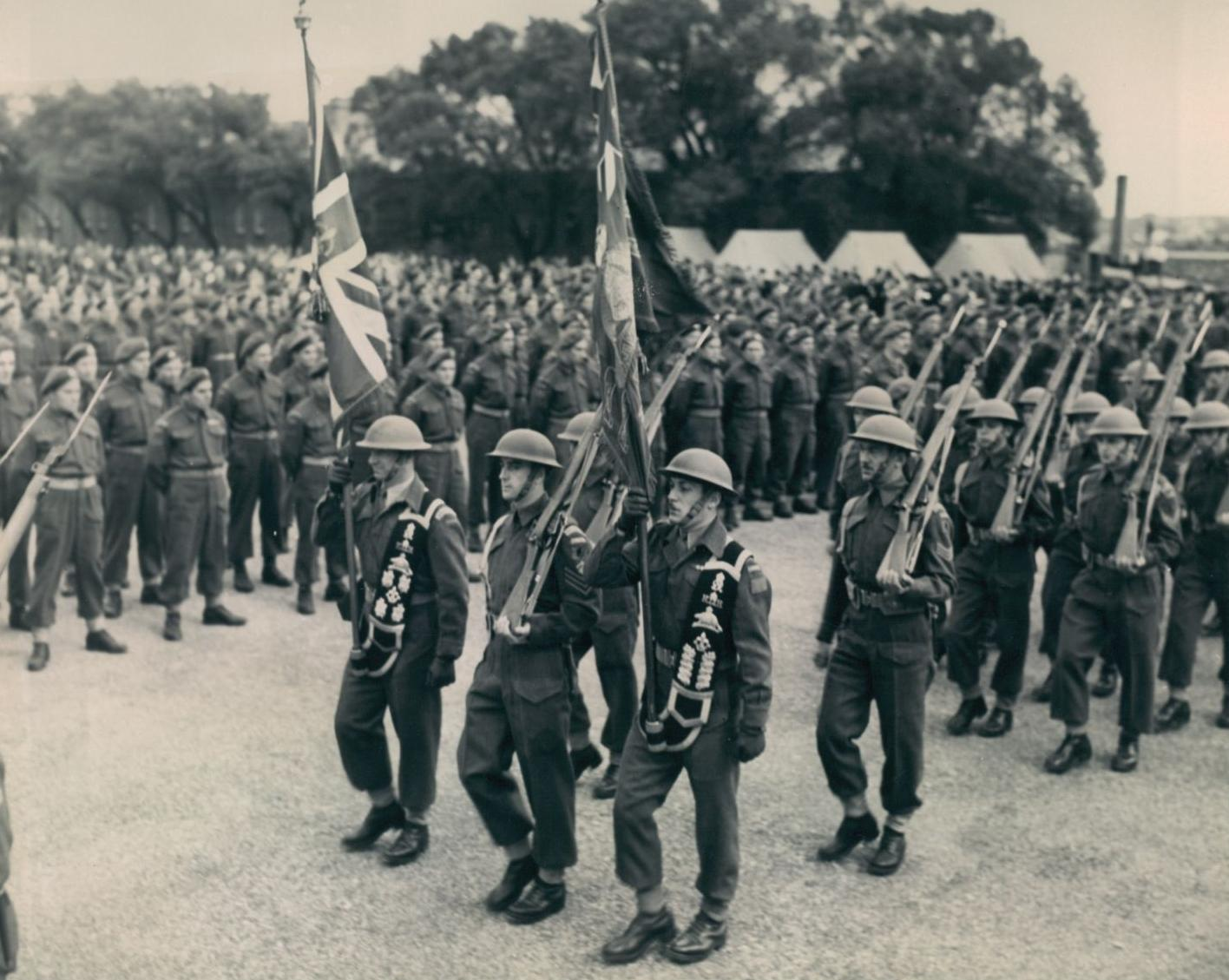
Parade marking the return of the regiment from Europe to the Citadel in Quebec City, 1945.

On 1 June 1945, a second Active Force component of the regiment was mobilized for service in the Pacific theatre of operations as the 1st Canadian Infantry Battalion (Royal 22^{e} Régiment), CASF. It was redesignated the 2nd Battalion (Royal 22^{e} Régiment), CIC, on 2 September 1945 and the Royal 22^{e} Régiment, CIC, on 1 March 1946. On 27 June 1946, it was embodied in the Permanent Force.

Details of Le Régiment de Châteauguay (Mitrailleuses) were called to service on 26 August 1939 and then placed on active service on 1 September 1939, as Le Régiment de Châteauguay (Mitrailleuses), CASF (Details), for local protection duties. The details called to active service were disbanded on 31 December 1940.

The regiment subsequently mobilized the 1st Battalion, Le Régiment de Châteauguay (Mitrailleuses), CASF for active service on 18 March 1942. It was re-designated as the 1st Airfield Defence Battalion (Le Régiment de Châteauguay) (Mitrailleuses), CIC, CASF on 19 July 1943, the 1st Airfield Defence Battalion (Le Régiment de Châteauguay), CIC, CASF on 1 January 1944 and the 1st Battalion, Le Régiment de Châteauguay, CIC, CASF on 1 September 1944. This unit served in Canada in a home defence role as part of the 7th Canadian Division, with three of its companies serving in Newfoundland. On 10 January 1945, the unit embarked for Great Britain, where it was disbanded on 18 January 1945 in order to provide reinforcements for the Canadian Army in the field.

Details from Le Régiment de St. Hyacinthe were called out on service on 26 August 1939 and then placed on active service on 1 September 1939 as Le Régiment de St. Hyacinthe, CASF (Details), for local protection duties. The details called out on active service were disbanded on 31 December 1940. The regiment subsequently mobilized the 1st Battalion, Le Régiment de St. Hyacinthe, CASF for active service on 3 January 1942. This unit served in Canada in a home defence role as part of Atlantic Command and in Newfoundland from April 1943 to September 1944. The battalion was disbanded on 14 January 1946.

=== United Nations operations – Korea ===
Three battalions of the Royal 22^{e} Régiment served in the Republic of Korea as part of the 25th Canadian Infantry Brigade, 1st Commonwealth Division. The 2nd Battalion formed as part of the Special Force was the first to arrive in Korea, serving there from 4 May 1951 to 24 April 1952, followed by the 1st Battalion from 20 April 1952 to 21 April 1953 then the 3rd Battalion from 16 April 1953 to the Armistice on 27 July 1953.

=== Oka Crisis ===
In the summer of 1990, the Attorney General of Quebec requisitioned the Canadian Armed Forces, including the Van Doos, to challenge Mohawk activists and warriors in Kanehsatà꞉ke and Kahnawake in a confrontation called the Oka Crisis.

=== Gulf War ===
'C' Company from the 1st Battalion, then based at CFB Lahr in West Germany as part of 4 Canadian Mechanized Brigade Group, served in Doha, Qatar, providing airfield security from 24 December 1990 to the end of March 1991.

=== Afghanistan ===
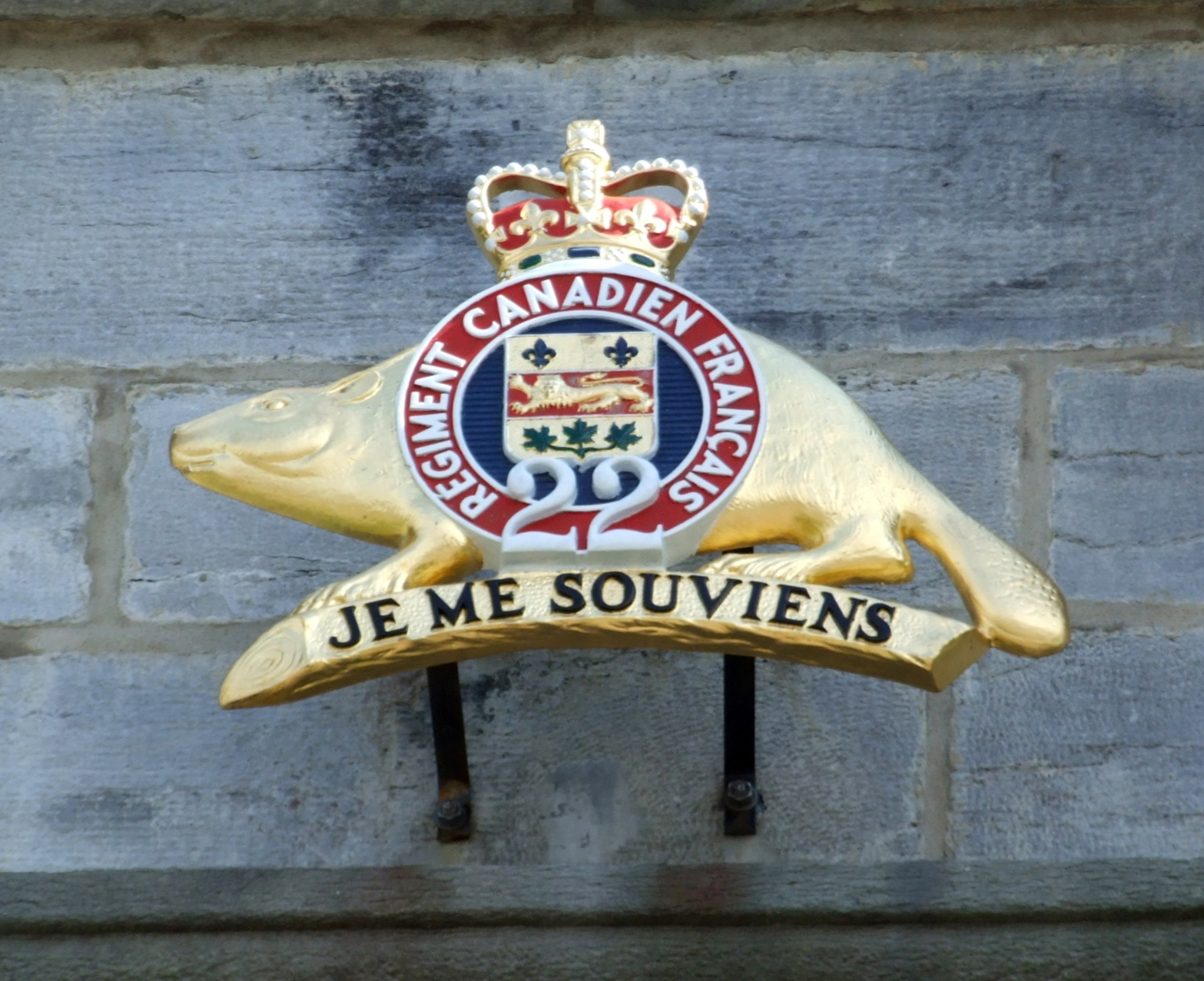
The badge of the regiment above the entry to the Citadelle of Quebec

The 3rd Battalion, along with an attached mechanized company from the 1st, provided the basis for the Canadian ISAF contingent in Kabul, Afghanistan, from February to August 2004.

In August 2007 the battle group based on the 3rd Battalion of the Royal 22^{e} Régiment returned to Afghanistan, replacing the 2nd Battalion The Royal Canadian Regiment in Kandahar province. This battle group was made up of a company from each of the regiment's three regular battalions. It also included combat support and service support from all the units of 5 Canadian Mechanized Brigade Group in Valcartier, Quebec. There was a reconnaissance squadron from the 12^{e} Régiment blindé du Canada, a composite tank squadron from Lord Strathcona's Horse (with troops from the other two armoured regiments), a battery from the 5^{e} Régiment d'artillerie légère du Canada, an engineer squadron from 5 Combat Engineer Regiment. The battle group, awarded the Commander-in-Chief Unit Commendation, was "instrumental in dismantling improvised explosive device networks, re-capturing checkpoints and returning them to Afghan control, enhancing the capacity of Afghan forces and providing guidance on community building and local governance".

The Royal 22nd Regiment also provided about 150 trainers (in Operational Mentoring and Liaison Teams (OMLTs)) for the three Afghan "Kandaks" serving with them. As well it provided a protection company for the Provincial Reconstruction Team (PRT) in Kandahar.

The regiment distinguished itself in Kandahar through its determined and successful efforts to establish Afghan police sub-stations, protected by Afghan National Army and Canadian presence, in an ever-widening secure zone in the former Taliban home districts of Zhari and Panjawaii. Light infantry elements often fought toe-to-toe with the Taliban, relying heavily on sniper fire and man-portable grenade launchers to gain the edge over the militants. The battle group, and its associated OMLT and PRT elements, had 10 men killed in action during the six-month tour. The many wounded included Captain Simon Mailloux, a Van Doos platoon commander who returned two years later to Kandahar even though his leg had to be amputated.

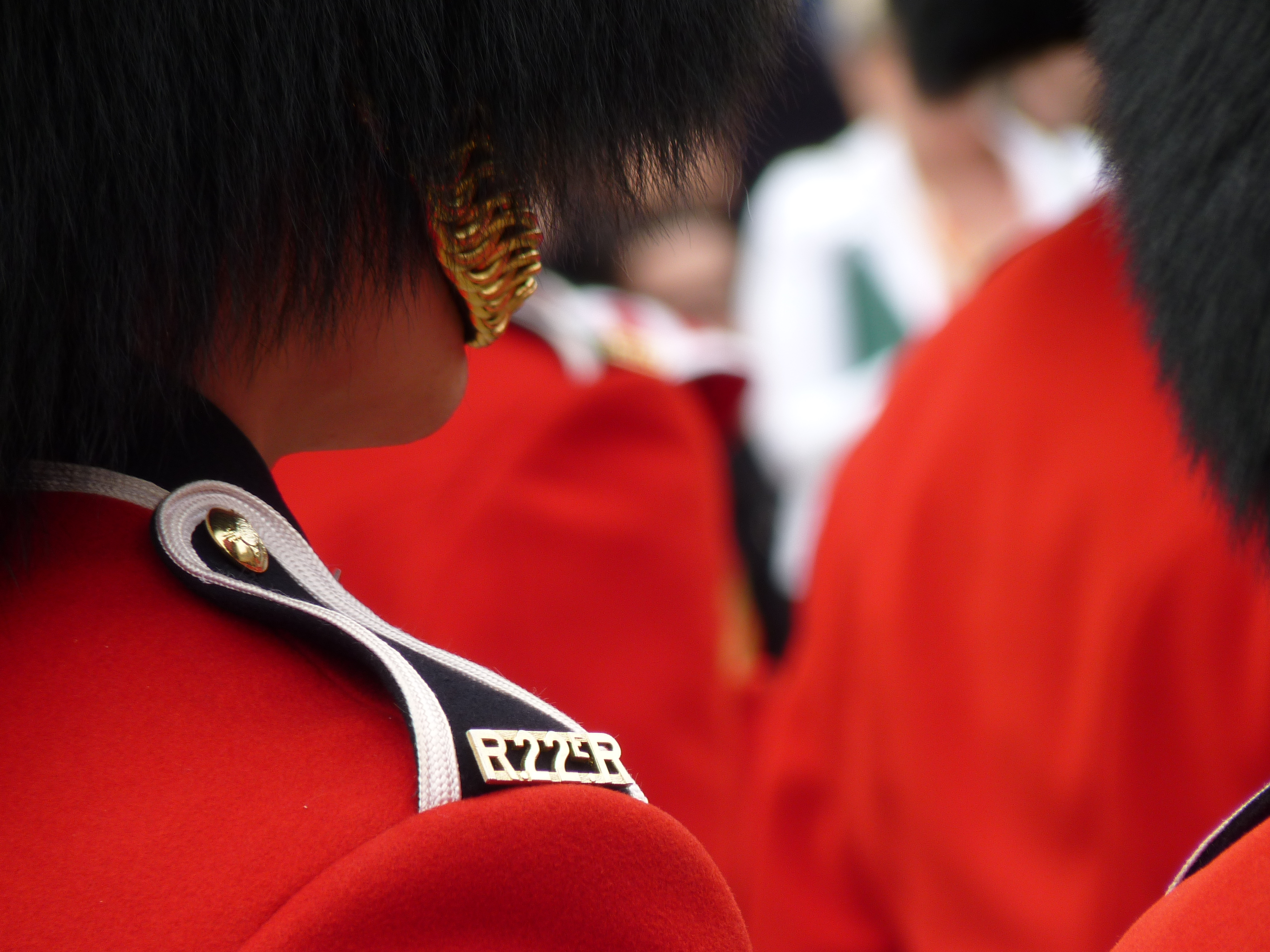
A member of the regiment wearing the shoulder title at Canada Day celebrations

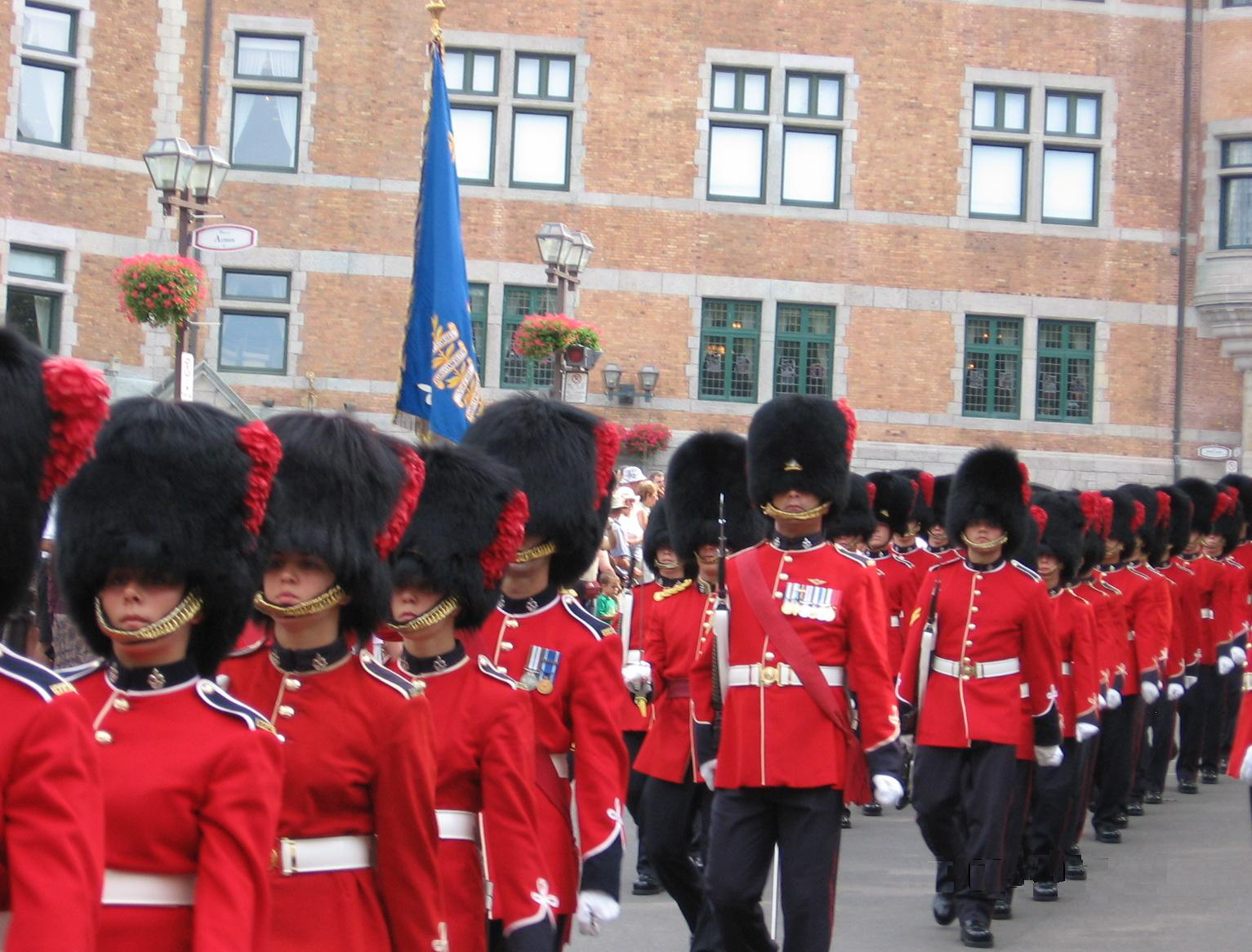
Van Doos at the 400th anniversary of Quebec City, their home base.

A second Van Doos battle group, this time based on the 2nd Battalion, deployed to Kandahar from March to November 2009 and was the vanguard of the much-vaunted "key villages" program, wherein Canadian soldiers cleared urban areas of Taliban activity during sweeping combat operations and then installed sub-units permanently in those hamlets, guarding the approaches to Kandahar City. The composition of this battle group was nearly identical to previous incarnations, and it was able to rely heavily on the recently deployed CH-146 Griffon and CH-47 Chinook helicopters to perform a wide variety of airmobile operations, as well as traditional mechanized manoeuvres. The Griffon helicopters proved especially capable at spotting Taliban movements and directing accurate artillery fire on them, preventing Taliban groups from effectively re-infiltrating areas previously cleared.

Over the course of the seven-month Rotation 7, ten soldiers from the battle group were killed in action ("Rotation 7" denoting that this was the eighth consecutive Canadian battle group deployment in Kandahar since 2006, as rotations are numbered starting at "0"). Five additional Canadian soldiers, all belonging to the battle group's parent organization, Task Force Kandahar, also died during that period. The vast majority of these soldiers were killed by the Taliban's lethal employment of anti-vehicle or anti-personnel improvised explosive devices.

The final Canadian combat mission began in the fall of 2010 with the 1st Battalion Battle Group (BG) commanded by Lieutenant-colonel Michel-Henri St. Louis. One of the main operations taken on by the BG was Operation Baawar beginning in December 2010 featuring a major road project and a strongpoint construction project led by engineers, tanks, and infantry.

== Memorials ==
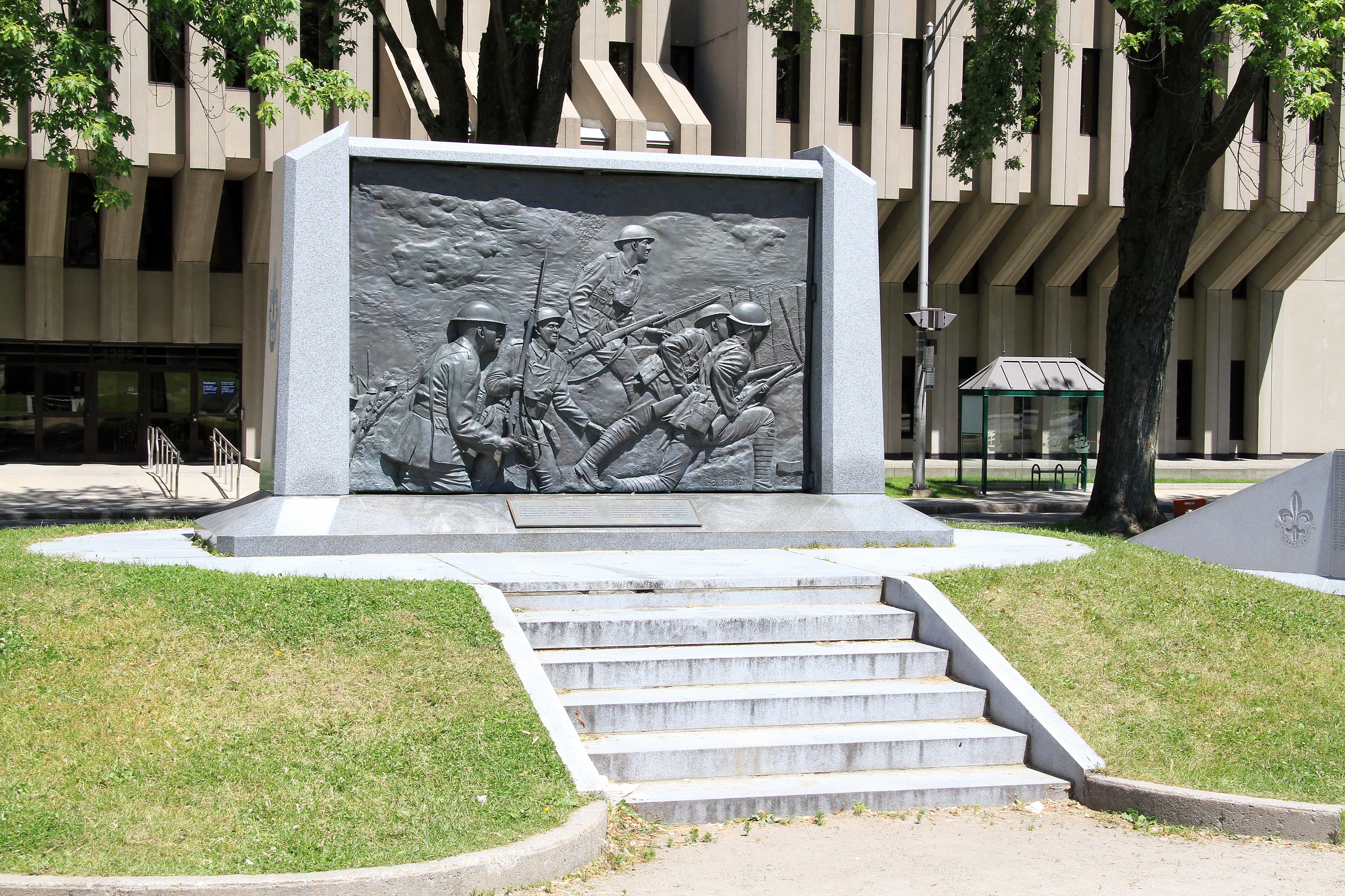
Je me souviens (1989) Royal 22^{e} Régiment memorial by André Gauthier (sculptor) at Quebec City Armoury

A stone shaft was erected on the grounds of Royal Military College Saint-Jean on 26 September 1964 to commemorate the founding of the Royal 22nd Regiment; the regiment trained at Fort Saint-Jean in 1914. The monument lists the regiment's battle honours.

Je me souviens (1989) by André Gauthier, a 6-by-9-foot (1.8 m × 2.7 m) bronze haut-relief bronze and granite wall memorial, was erected at Place George V in front of the Grande Allée Armoury in Quebec City. Unveiled on 11 November 1989, the sculpture honours the memory of the soldiers from the Royal 22^{e} Régiment who were killed during the First and Second World Wars and the Korean War. The sculptor was inspired by A.T.C. Bastiens' painting L'Avance at the Canadian War Museum. The names of soldiers are inscribed in granite on the monument.

There is a group of 28 gravestones of members of the Royal 22^{e} Régiment who died between 1929 and 1960 in the Notre Dame de Belmont Cemetery in Quebec City. Four gravestones, dated 1929, 1935, 1938, 1938 feature a crown, beaver and regimental motto. Seven gravestones, dated 1939, 1941, 1941, 1942, 1942, 1942, 1947 feature the Maple Leaf and Canadian Forces cross. Seven gravestones feature the Canadian Forces cross dated 1954, 1954, 1955, 1955, 1955, 1954, 1960.

Royal 22^{e} Régiment memorial (1914–1964)

== Battalions ==
Battalion	Home	Higher formation	Notes
1st Battalion, Royal 22^{e} Régiment	CFB Valcartier	5 Canadian Mechanized Brigade Group	Mechanized infantry
2nd Battalion, Royal 22^{e} Régiment	Quebec City	5 Canadian Mechanized Brigade Group	Mechanized infantry, includes a Precision Drill Team
3rd Battalion, Royal 22^{e} Régiment	CFB Valcartier	3rd Canadian Light Infantry Regiment	Light infantry, includes a Parachute company, a Jungle company, Mountain company, an Assault Pioneer platoon
4th Battalion, Royal 22^{e} Régiment (Châteauguay)	Laval, Quebec	34 Canadian Brigade Group	Reserve, dismounted infantry, includes an Assault Pioneer platoon
6th Battalion, Royal 22^{e} Régiment	Saint-Hyacinthe, Quebec	34 Canadian Brigade Group	Reserve, dismounted infantry, musical band (6th Battalion Royal 22^{e} Régiment Band)
La Musique du Royal 22^{e} Régiment	CFB Valcartier	2nd Canadian Division	Regular Force professional band

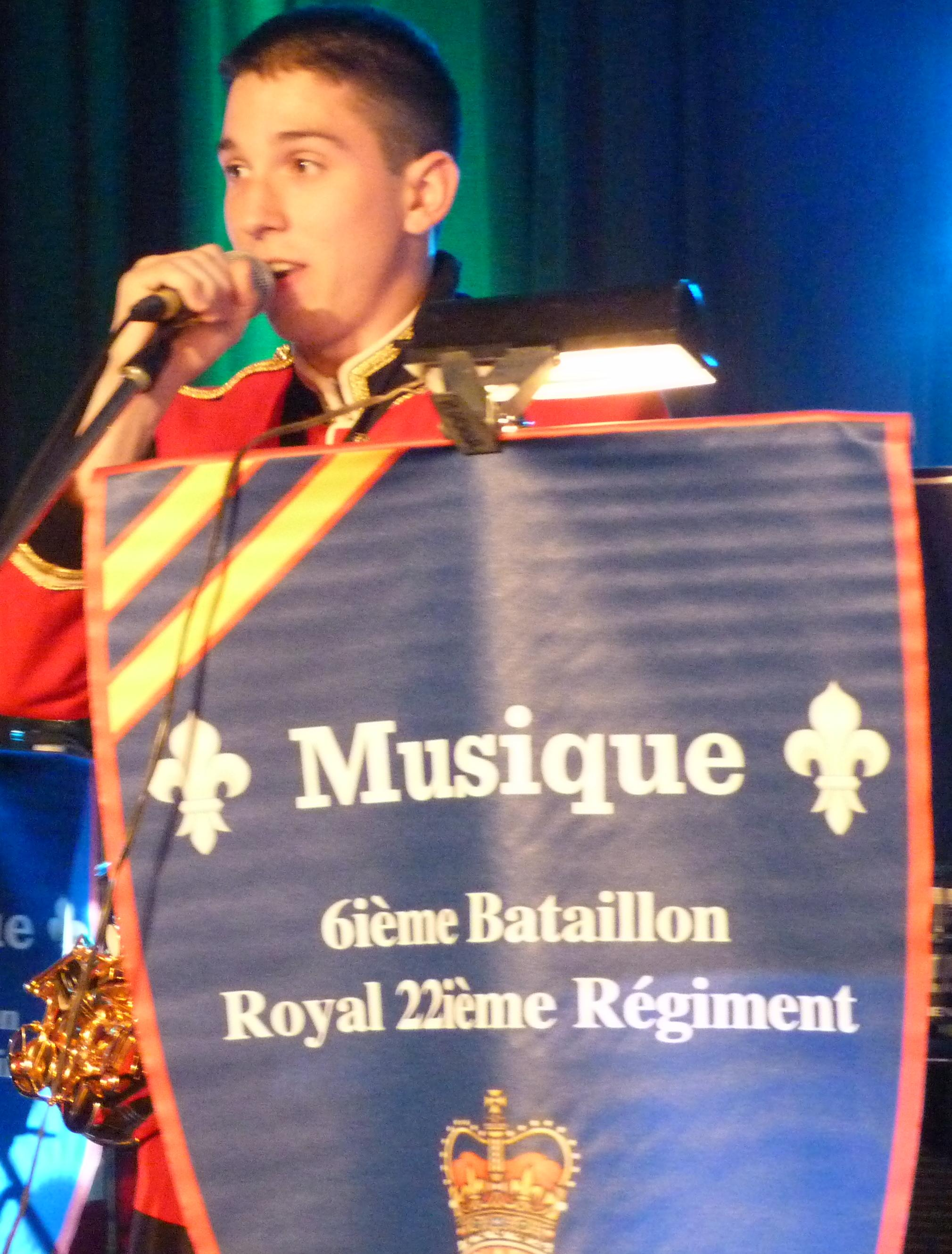
Royal 22nd Regiment Band

== Armouries ==
Site	Date(s)	Designated	Description	Image
Saint-Hyacinthe Armoury 2155 Laframboise Blvd. Saint-Hyacinthe, Quebec	1905–06	Canada's Register of Historic Places; Recognized – 2005 Register of the Government of Canada Heritage Buildings	Housing the 6th Battalion of the Royal 22^{e} Régiment, this centrally located brick-and-stone building is composed of a drill hall, a simple rectangular block with a gable roof, and the north block.	
St. Lambert Armoury; St. Lambert, Quebec	1928 Simeon Brais		housing the 4th Battalion, Royal 22^{e} Régiment (Châteauguay)	

== Battle honours ==
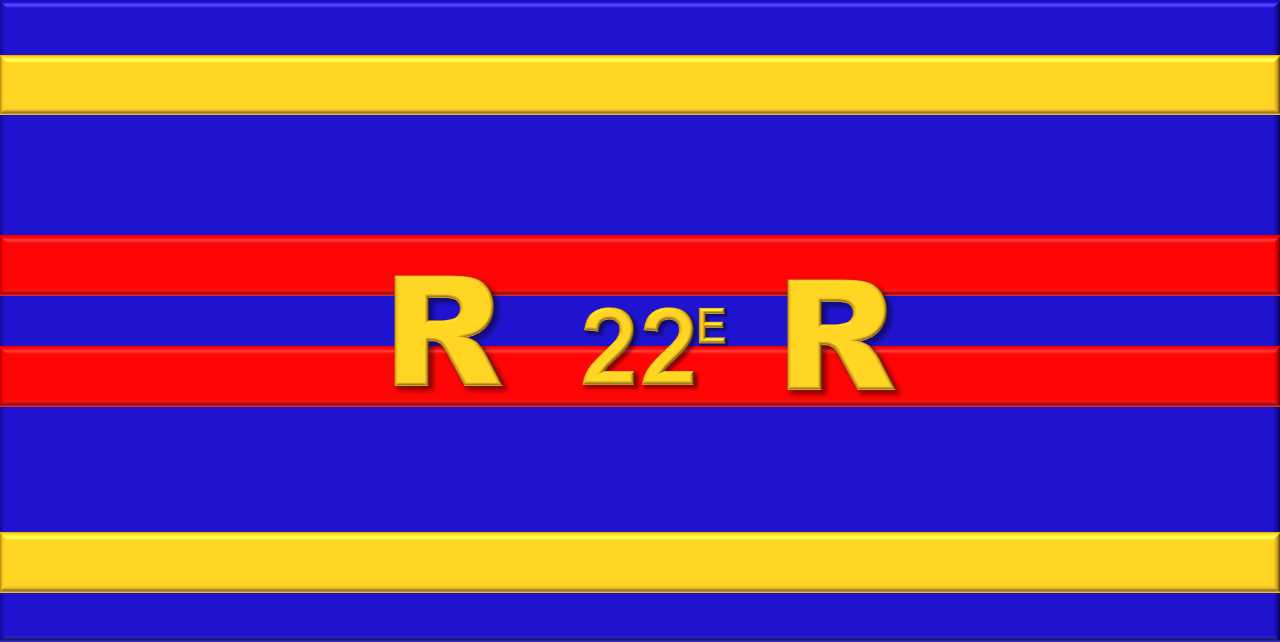
Camp flag of the Royal 22^{e} Régiment

Battle honours in small capitals are for large operations and campaigns and those in lowercase are for more specific battles. Bold type indicates honours emblazoned on regimental colours.

War of 1812
- Defence of Canada – 1812–1815 – Défense du Canada
- Châteauguay
- Crysler's Farm (awarded in commemoration of the Canadian Fencible Infantry)

Non-emblazonable honorary distinction Defence of Canada – 1812–1815 – Défense du Canada

First World War
- **Mount Sorrel**
- **Somme, 1916, '18**
- **Flers–Courcelette**
- Thiepval
- Ancre Heights
- **Arras, 1917, '18**
- **Vimy, 1917**
- Arleux
- Scarpe, 1917, '18
- Hill 70
- **Ypres, 1917**
- **Passchendaele**
- **Amiens**
- Hindenburg Line
- Canal du Nord
- **Cambrai, 1918**
- Pursuit to Mons
- **France and Flanders, 1915–18**
Second World War
- Landing in Sicily
- Valguarnera
- Adrano
- **Catenuova**
- **Sicily, 1943**
- Landing at Reggio
- Potenza
- The Sangro
- **Casa Berardi**
- Torre Mucchio
- Cassino Ii
- Gustav Line
- Liri Valley
- **Hitler Line**
- **Gothic Line**
- Borgo Santa Maria
- **Lamone Crossing**
- Rimini Line
- San Martino–San Lorenzo
- **San Fortunato**
- Cesena
- **Italy, 1943–1945**
- **Apeldoorn**
- **North-West Europe, 1945**
United Nations Operations – Korea
Korea, 1951–1953
South-West Asia
Afghanistan

== Honorary distinction ==
The non-emblazonable honorary distinction DEFENCE OF CANADA - 1812-1815 - DÉFENSE DU CANADA.

== Victoria Cross recipients ==
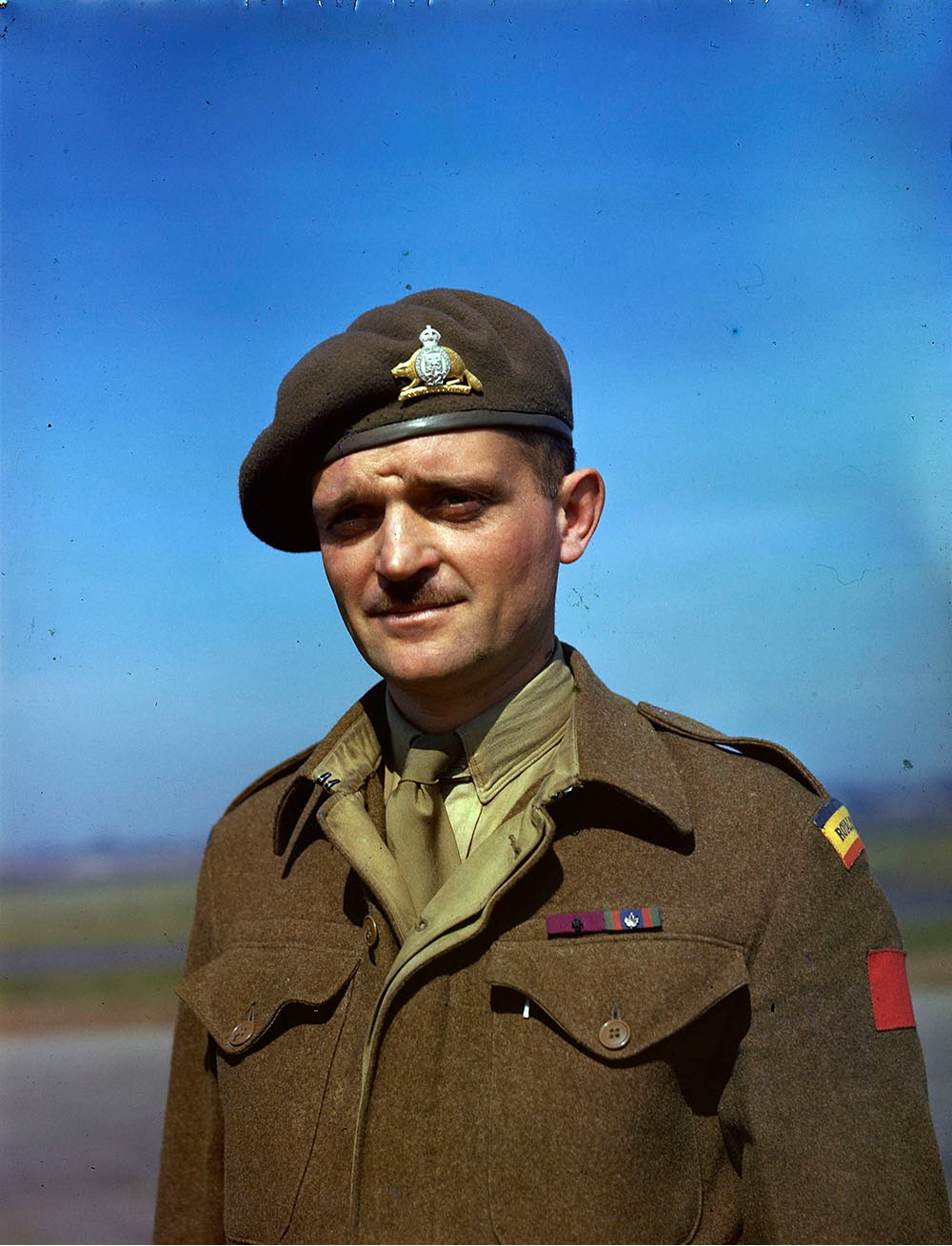
Major Paul Triquet wearing Victoria Cross ribbon bar

- Corporal Joseph Kaeble† – 22nd Battalion, Canadian Expeditionary Force – Neuville-Vitasse, France – 8 June 1918
- Lieutenant Jean Brillant† – 22nd Battalion, Canadian Expeditionary Force – near Amiens, France – 8–9 August 1918
- Major Paul Triquet – Royal 22^{e} Régiment – Casa Berardi, Italy – 14 December 1943

† – Awarded posthumously

== Lineage ==
=== Royal 22^{e} Régiment ===
- Originated in Saint-Jean-sur- Richelieu, Quebec on 7 November 1914 as the 22nd (French Canadian) Battalion, CEF
- Redesignated 7 June 1915 as the 22nd (French Canadian) "Overseas" Battalion, CEF
- Permanent Active Militia component formed on 1 April 1920 designated as the 22nd Regiment
- Redesignated 1 June 1921 as The Royal 22nd Regiment
- Redesignated 15 June 1928 as the Royal 22^{e} Régiment
- Amalgamated 1 September 1954 with Le Régiment de Châteauguay, retaining the same designation
- Amalgamated 2 February 1956 with Le Régiment de St. Hyacinthe, retaining the same designation.

=== 4th Battalion, Royal 22^{e} Régiment (Châteauguay) ===
- Originated on 4 June 1869 in Beauharnois, Quebec as the Voltigeurs-Canadiens of Beauharnois
- Redesignated 5 November 1869 as the 64th Voltigeurs de Beauharnois
- Redesignated 8 May 1900 as the 64th Regiment "Voltigeurs de Beauharnois"
- Amalgamated 1 May 1901 with the 76th Regiment "Voltigeurs de Châteauguay" and redesignated as the 64th Regiment of Rifles "Voltigeurs de Chateauguay"
- Redesignated 1 March 1902 as the 64th Chateauguay and Beauharnois Regiment
- Redesignated 29 March 1920 as Le Régiment Châteauguay et Beauharnois
- Redesignated 15 March 1921 as Le Régiment de Châteauguay
- Redesignated 15 December 1936 as Le Régiment de Châteauguay (Mitrailleuses)
- Redesignated 16 March 1942 as the 2nd (Reserve) Battalion, Le Régiment de Châteauguay (Mitrailleuses)
- Redesignated 1 June 1945 Le Régiment de Châteauguay (Mitrailleuses)
- Redesignated 1 April 1946 as Le Régiment de Châteauguay
- Amalgamated 1 September 1954 with the Royal 22^{e} Régiment and designated as Le Régiment de Châteauguay (4th Battalion, Royal 22^{e} Régiment)
- Redesignated 27 April 1956 as the 4^{e} Bataillon, Royal 22^{e} Régiment (Châteauguay)
- Redesignated 12 August 1977 in English as the 4th Battalion, Royal 22^{e} Régiment (Châteauguay)

=== Fusiliers du S^{t}-Laurent ===
- Redesignated 1 September 1954 as Les Fusiliers du S^{t}-Laurent (5th Battalion, Royal 22^{e} Régiment). This was an affiliation not an amalgamation. Les Fusiliers du S^{t}-Laurent and the Royal 22^{e} Régiment were separate and distinct regiments.
- Redesignated 9 November 1963 as Les Fusiliers du S^{t}-Laurent (5^{e} Bataillon, Royal 22^{e} Régiment)
- Redesignated 1 April 1968 as Les Fusiliers du S^{t}-Laurent

=== 76th Regiment "Voltigeurs de Châteauguay" ===
- Originated 22 March 1872 in Sainte-Martine, Quebec as the 76th Battalion of Infantry or "Voltigeurs de Châteauguay"
- Redesignated 18 March 1881 as the 76th Battalion of Rifles or "Voltigeurs de Châteauguay"
- Redesignated 8 May 1900 as the 76th Regiment "Voltigeurs de Châteauguay"
- Amalgamated 1 May 1901 with the 64th Regiment "Voltigeurs de Beauharnois" and redesignated as the 64th Regiment of Rifles "Voltigeurs de Chateauguay"

=== 6th Battalion, Royal 22^{e} Régiment ===
- Originated 24 March 1871 in Saint-Hyacinthe, Quebec as the St. Hyacinthe Provisional Battalion of Infantry
- Redesignated 12 December 1879 as the 84th "St. Hyacinthe" Battalion of Infantry
- Redesignated 8 May 1900 as the 84th St. Hyacinthe Regiment
- Redesignated 29 March 1920 as Le Régiment de St. Hyacinthe
- Redesignated 3 January 1942 as the 2nd (Reserve) Battalion, Le Régiment de St. Hyacinthe
- Redesignated 14 January 1946 as Le Régiment de St. Hyacinthe
- Amalgamated 2 February 1956 with the Royal 22^{e} Régiment and redesignated as the 6th Battalion, Royal 22^{e} Régiment
- Redesignated 9 November 1963 as the 6^{e} Bataillon, Royal 22^{e} Régiment
- Redesignated 12 August 1977 in English as the 6th Battalion, Royal 22^{e} Régiment

=== Lineage chart ===
Lineage chart

1812	7th Bn, Select Embodied Militia	Les Chasseurs	Beauharnois, Beloeil, Boucherville, Chambly, Isle Jésus, St. Denis, St. Hyacinthe, St. Ours, and Verchères Divisions
1815	Disbanded	Disbanded	Disbanded
1862	Independent rifle and infy coys
1866	Independent infy coy	Independent infy coy
1869	Voltigeurs-Canadiens of Beauharnois
1869	64th Voltigeurs de Beauharnois
1871	St. Hyacinthe Provisional Bn of Infy
1872	76th Bn of Infy or "Voltigeurs de Châteauguay"
1879	84th "St. Hyacinthe" Bn of Infy
1881	76th Bn of Rifles or "Voltigeurs de Châteauguay"
1900	64th Regt "Voltigeurs de Beauharnois"	76th Regt "Voltigeurs de Châteauguay"	84th St. Hyacinthe Regt
1901	64th Regt of Rifles "Voltigeurs de Chateauguay"
1902	64th Chateauguay and Beauharnois Regt
1914	22nd (French Canadian) Bn, CEF
1915	22nd (French Canadian) "Overseas" Bn, CEF
1920	22nd Regt (Note: CEF component disbanded)	22nd Regt (Note: Permanent Active Militia component formed)	1st Bn (206th Bn, CEF), Le Rég^{t} Châteauguay et Beauharnois	2nd Bn, (Note: Reserve order of battle) Le Rég^{t} Châteauguay et Beauharnois	1st Bn, Le Rég^{t} de S^{t.} Hyacinthe	2nd Bn, Le Rég^{t} de S^{t.} Hyacinthe
1921	Royal 22nd Regt	1st Bn (206th Bn, CEF), Le Rég^{t} de Châteauguay	2nd Bn, Le Rég^{t} de Châteauguay
1922	1st Bn, Le Rég^{t} de Châteauguay
1928	Royal 22^{e} Rég^{t}
1936	Le Rég^{t} de Châteauguay (Mitrailleuses)	Disbanded	Le Rég^{t} de S^{t.} Hyacinthe	Disbanded
1939	Royal 22^{e} Rég^{t}, CASF
1942	1st Bn, Le Rég^{t} de Châteauguay (Mitrailleuses), CASF	2nd (Reserve) Bn, Le Rég^{t} de Châteauguay (Mitrailleuses)	1st Bn, Le Rég^{t} de S^{t.} Hyacinthe, CASF	2nd (Reserve) Bn, Le Rég^{t} de S^{t.} Hyacinthe
1943	1st Airfield Defence Bn (Le Rég^{t} de Châteauguay) (Mitrailleuses), CIC, CASF
1944	1st Airfield Defence Bn (Le Rég^{t} de Châteauguay), CIC, CASF
1944	1st Bn, Le Rég^{t} de Châteauguay, CIC, CASF
1945	1st Canadian Infy Bn (Royal 22^{e} Rég^{t}), CASF	Disbanded	Le Rég^{t} de Châteauguay (Mitrailleuses)
1945	2nd Bn (Royal 22^{e} Rég^{t}), CIC
1946	Royal 22^{e} Rég^{t}, CIC	Disbanded	Le Rég^{t} de Châteauguay	Disbanded	Le Rég^{t} de S^{t.} Hyacinthe
1950	Royal 22^{e} Rég^{t} (1st Bn), RCIC	2nd Bn, Royal 22^{e} Rég^{t}, RCIC	3rd Bn, Royal 22^{e} Rég^{t}, RCIC
1952	1st Bn, Royal 22^{e} Rég^{t}, RCIC	2nd Bn, Royal 22^{e} Rég^{t}
1953	1st Bn, Royal 22^{e} Rég^{t}	3rd Bn, Royal 22^{e} Rég^{t}
1954	Le Rég^{t} de Châteauguay (4th Bn, Royal 22^{e} Rég^{t})
1956	4^{e} B^{on}, Royal 22^{e} Rég^{t} (Châteauguay)	6th Bn, Royal 22^{e} Rég^{t}
1963	1^{er} B^{on}, Royal 22^{e} Rég^{t}	2^{e} B^{on}, Royal 22^{e} Rég^{t}	3^{e} B^{on}, Royal 22^{e} Rég^{t}	6^{e} B^{on}, Royal 22^{e} Rég^{t}
1977	1st Bn, Royal 22^{e} Rég^{t}	2nd Bn, Royal 22^{e} Rég^{t}	3rd Bn, Royal 22^{e} Rég^{t}	4th Bn, Royal 22^{e} Rég^{t} (Châteauguay)	6th Bn, Royal 22^{e} Rég^{t}
2012	Perpetuates War of 1812 units	Perpetuates War of 1812 units	Perpetuates War of 1812 units	Perpetuates War of 1812 units	Perpetuates War of 1812 units

== Perpetuations ==
=== War of 1812 ===
- 7th Battalion, Select Embodied Militia
- "Les Chasseurs"
- Beauharnois Division
- Beloeil Division
- Boucherville Division
- Chambly Division
- Isle Jésus Division
- St. Denis Division
- St. Hyacinthe Division
- St. Ours Division
- Verchères Division
- Canadian Regiment of Fencible Infantry

== Order of precedence ==
Regular Force:

Preceded by Princess Patricia's Canadian Light Infantry	Royal 22^{e} Régiment	Succeeded by None; last in precedence of infantry regiments

Reserve Force:

Preceded by Le Régiment de la Chaudière	4th Battalion, Royal 22^{e} Régiment (Châteauguay)	Succeeded by 6th Battalion, Royal 22^{e} Régiment
Preceded by 4th Battalion, Royal 22^{e} Régiment (Châteauguay)	6th Battalion, Royal 22^{e} Régiment	Succeeded by Les Fusiliers Mont-Royal

== Alliances ==
- United Kingdom – The Royal Welsh
- United Kingdom – 4th Battalion, Mercian Regiment

== Freedom of the city (military) ==
The Royal 22^{e} Régiment exercises its freedom of the city annually in Quebec City on 3 July of each year. Quebec cities that have granted freedom of the city to the regiment include: Quebec City, Saint-Hyacinthe, Saint-Jérôme, Farnham, Saint-Jean-sur-Richelieu, Drummondville and Val-Bélair. Foreign cities that have granted freedom of the city to the regiment include: Werl, Germany; Lahr, Germany, and Ortona, Italy, on 14 April 1993.

== In popular culture ==
The Van Doos are the subject of a 2011 National Film Board of Canada documentary Le 22^{e} Régiment en Afghanistan (English: The Van Doos in Afghanistan). The documentary was filmed in Afghanistan in March 2011. On 9 November 2011, the film was previewed for the families of 26 soldiers who had died during their mission in Afghanistan, at a ceremony at the Valcartier base. A commemorative mural by Canadian artist Dave Sopha was also unveiled.

Hyena Road is a 2015 Canadian war drama film shown in the Gala Presentations section of the 2015 Toronto International Film Festival. The title comes from route Hyena built in Afghanistan in 2010–2011 by 1 R22^{e}R Battle Group. The film features an English-speaking Princess Patricia's Canadian Light Infantry battle group, reflecting the language of the target audience.

== Alliances ==
The regiment had an alliance with the Royal Welch Fusiliers from 1927 until that regiment's amalgamation into the Royal Welsh in 2006; this alliance included the frequent exchange of personnel between the two regiments.

== Royal 22^{e} Régiment Music ==
The song L'immortel 22ème Canadien-français by Paul Ravennes (music), and Léon Chevalier (words) was published by J.E. Belair, Montreal. The first line is: Gloire au vailland 22ème, a lui la palme de vainqueur; Refrain: Vaillants soldats, vos noms dans notre histoire.

- Jean F. Pierret, conductor "La Citadelle; la musique du Royal 22^{e} Régiment" (1975 Trans-Canada Musique Service Inc., 7033, route Transcanadienne, Saint-Laurent, Québec H4T 1S2)
- Victor Falardeau & Jean Parent, conductor "La musique du Royal 22^{e} Régiment: 50 ans d'histoire, 1922-1972" (Québec: Editions Garneau, 1976)
- Capt. J.P. Armand Ferland, conductor "The Van Doos: the band of the Royal 22^{e} Régiment" (RCA Victor Canada International, PCS-1007)
- "Recueil de chants du Royal 22^{e} Régiment" (Val-Cartier: s.n., 197-?)

== Badge ==
Coat of arms of Royal 22e Régiment
Adopted 2008 Motto Je me souviens ("I remember"). Badge A beaver couchant proper on a log Or bearing the motto JE ME SOUVIENS in letters Sable, overall a hurt charged with the 1868 arms of the province of Quebec (Or on a fess Gules between in chief two fleurs-de-lis Azure and in base a sprig of maple leaves Vert, a lion passant guardant Or) within an annulus Gules edged and inscribed REGIMENT CANADIEN FRANCAIS, surmounted at the base by the number 22 Argent and ensigned by the Royal Crown proper. Symbolism The beaver represents service to Canada, and the Crown, service to the Sovereign. The shield is the coat of arms granted to the province of Quebec in 1868. The fleurs-de-lis emphasize the French origin of the population, the lion on a red background recalls Quebec's ties to Great Britain and the sprig of three maple leaves is a symbol of Canada. The number "22" and the words "REGIMENT CANADIEN FRANCAIS" represent the 22nd Battalion of the Canadian Expeditionary Force of the First World War. "JE ME SOUVIENS" is the motto of the regiment and of the province of Quebec.

== Possible specialist Arctic sovereignty role ==
It has been suggested in some Canadian professional military journals that the regiment's third battalion (3 R22eR) could be adapted to become a specialist amphibious battalion or a specialized light infantry battalion that is able to deploy parachute infantry and marine infantry company groups to support the protection of Canada's sovereignty in the Arctic.

== See also ==
- The Canadian Crown and the Canadian Forces
- List of Canadian organizations with royal patronage
- 33rd Vaudreuil and Soulanges Hussars
