= Vive la Canadienne =

French Canadian anthem

Vive la Canadienne is the current regimental quick march of the Royal 22nd Regiment.

Vive la Canadienne was the anthem of French Canadians in Quebec before it was replaced by O Canada. According to Ernest Gagnon, it was based on an old French tune, Par derrièr' chez mon père.

It is the quick march of the Royal 22nd Regiment.

== Lyrics ==
=== French lyrics ===
Vive la canadienne, vole mon coeur vole, vole, vole
Vive la canadienne et ses jolis yeux doux
Et ses jolis yeux doux doux doux, et ses jolis yeux doux (bis)
Vive la canadienne et ses jolis yeux doux

Elle est vraiment chrétienne, vole mon coeur vole, vole, vole
Elle est vraiment chrétienne, trésor de son époux
Trésor de son époux pou pou, trésor de son époux palipatouti!
Elle est vraiment chrétienne, trésor de son époux

Elle rayonne et brille vole mon coeur vole, vole, vole
Elle rayonne et brille, avec ou sans bijoux
Avec ou sans bijoux jou jou, avec ou sans bijou mouah!
Elle rayonne et brille avec ou sans bijoux

C'est à qui la marie, vole mon coeur vole, vole, vole
C'est à qui la marie, les garçons en sont fous
Les garçons en sont fous fou fou, les garçons en sont fous (bis)
C'est à qui la marie, les garçons en sont fous

Que d'enfants elle donne, vole mon coeur vole, vole, vole
Que d'enfants elle donne, à son joyeux époux
À son joyeux époux pou pou, à son joyeux époux mouah!
Que d'enfants elle donne à son joyeux époux

Jusqu'à l'heure dernière, vole mon coeur vole, vole, vole
Jusqu'à l'heure dernière, sa vie est toute à nous
Sa vie est toute à nous nou nou, sa vie est toute à nous (bis)
Jusqu'à l'heure dernière sa vie est toute à nous.

=== English translation ===
Long live the Canadian, fly my heart fly, fly, fly,
Long live the Canadian and her pretty sweet eyes
And her sweet soft sweet eyes, and her sweet eyes (twice)
Long live the Canadian and her sweet eyes

She's really Christian, fly my heart fly, fly, fly,
She is truly Christian, the treasure of her husband
Treasure of her husband husband, treasure of her husband palipatouti!
She is truly Christian, treasure of her husband

She shines and shines fly my heart fly, fly, fly,
She shines and shines, with or without jewels
With or without jewels jou jou, with or without jewels mouah!
She shines and shines with or without jewels

Who's the bride, fly my heart fly, fly, fly,
Who's the bride, the boys are crazy for her
The boys are crazy crazy crazy, the boys are crazy (twice)
Who's the bride, the boys are crazy for her

What children she gives, fly my heart fly, fly, fly,
What children she gives, to her happy husband
To her happy husband husband, to her happy husband mouah!
How many children she gives to her happy husband

Until the last hour, fly my heart fly, fly, fly,
Until the last hour, her life is all ours
Her life is all ours ours ours, her life is all ours (twice)
Until the last hour her life is all ours.

== In popular culture ==
- It is used as the theme for the Canadian civilization in Civilization VI: Gathering Storm along with O Canada and The Crooked Stovepipe.
