= Alice Braunlich =

American classical philologist

Alice Freda Braunlich (February 1, 1888 – August 9, 1989) was an American classical philologist.

== Life ==
Braunlich was born to parents of German extraction, Emilie Hedwig Hoering Braunlich and the physician Henry Uchtorf Braunlich, in Davenport, Iowa on February 1, 1888. Her father's income made it possible for Alice to study at the University of Chicago, where she obtained a bachelor's degree in 1908 and a master's degree in 1909. From 1912 to 1914 she worked as an assistant for William Gardner Hale, professor of Latin. In 1913 she received her Ph.D., with a dissertation on indirect questions in the indicative mood.

From 1914 to 1918, she worked as a Latin instructor at the Frances Shimer School in Mount Carroll, Illinois, which later became Shimer College. Also during this period, from 1916 to 1917, she worked at the summer school at the University of Chicago. In 1918 she took a teaching position at Davenport High School, in her home town. In 1920 she became Associate Professor at Goucher College in Towson, Maryland, where she taught and studied until her retirement in 1956, becoming Full Professor in 1925.

Braunlich spent her retirement in Davenport, where she died on August 9, 1989, at the age of 101. Even after her retirement, she continued to publish on the syntax of various classical writers.
