= Helmut Braunlich =

American classical composer

Helmut Braunlich (born 19 May 1929 in Brünn, Moravia; d. 24 May 2013) was a German-American violinist, composer, and musicologist.

== Education ==
He received his formal musical education at the Mozarteum in Salzburg, where he studied violin with Christa Richter-Steiner, composition with Egon Kornauth, and music history with Eberhard Preußner. After his immigration (1951) to the United States in 1951 he played with various professional symphony orchestras and became a member of the U.S. Air Force Symphony Orchestra. He studied composition at the Catholic University of America in Washington, D.C., where one of his teachers was the great organist, Prof. Conrad Bernier. After earning his master's degree in composition with a concerto for two violins and orchestra, he pursued doctoral studies, earning his Ph.D. in Musicology.

== Career ==
Here he taught numerous courses in composition, music theory, and performance practice. In 1988 he was promoted to Professor. In 1989 the state government of Bavaria, awarded him the "Sudetendeutscher Kulturpreis" in composition. He served as the chairperson of the Composition Department at the Benjamin T. Rome School of Music at the Catholic University of America, until he became professor emeritus in 1999. From then on he devoted his time mostly to composition and performance, but also taught selected graduate students.

== Compositions ==
During his career he received commissions from a variety of organizations. Among them are the Contemporary Music Forum, the Montgomery County Youth Symphony Orchestra, the Catholic University Wind Ensemble, and the Friday Morning Music Club Foundation. As a member of the Society of Composers, Prof. Braunlich devotes his efforts to the promotion of composition, performance, understanding and dissemination of new and contemporary music. Compositions by Helmut Braunlich include works for orchestra, chamber music, works for various solo instruments, and songs. Several chamber music works have been published by McGinnis & Marx and by Tap Music Sales. His recordings are available on Educo Records, Opus One Records, and Centaur Compact Disc.
