= List of defunct newspapers of Quebec =

This is a list of defunct newspapers of Quebec presented in order of first appearance.

== 1770–1799 ==
- La Gazette du commerce et littéraire pour la Ville & District de Montréal, 1778, Montréal, Fleury Mesplet, printer, and Valentin Jautard, editor and journalist
- La Gazette de Montréal/The Montreal Gazette, 1785, Montréal, Fleury Mesplet, printer
- Le Courier de Québec ou héraut francois, 1788, Quebec City, William Moore, editor, and James Tanswell, collaborator
- Quebec Herald and Universal Miscellany, 1788, Quebec City, William Moore, editor, and James Tanswell, collaborator
- Le Magasin de Quebec/The Quebec Magazine, 1792, Quebec City, Samuel Neilson, printer and editor
- Le Cours du tems, 1794, Quebec City, John Jones and William Vondenvelden

== 1800–1819 ==
- The British American Register, 1802, Quebec City, John Neilson, owner and publisher
- Quebec Mercury, 1804, Quebec City, Thomas Cary, owner
- L'Almanach des dames, 1806, Louis Plamondon, editor
- Le Canadien 1806, Quebec City, Pierre Bédard, François Blanchet and Jean-Thomas Taschereau
- Courier de Québec, 1807, Quebec City, Pierre-Amable de Bonne and Joseph-François Perrault, founders, Pierre-Édouard Desbarats, printer, Jacques Labrie, editor
- Canadian courant and Montreal Advertiser, 1807, Montréal, Nahum Mower, owner and editor
- La Gazette canadienne/The Canadian Gazette, 1807, Montréal, Charles Brown, publisher and James Brown, editor
- Le Vrai Canadien, 1810, Quebec City, Pierre-Amable de Bonne
- ''The Montreal Herald'', 1811, Montréal, William Gray and Mungo Kay, founders, owners and publishers
- Le Spectateur canadien, 1815, Charles-Bernard Pasteur, owner, editor and publisher
- The Canadian Inspector, 1815, Montréal, Nahum Mower, publisher
- The Quebec Telegraph, 1816
- L'Aurore, 1817, Montréal, Michel Bibaud and Joseph Victor Delorme
- Gazette des Trois-Rivières, 1817, Trois-Rivières, Ludger Duvernay, founder, printer and editor
- L'Abeille canadienne, 1818, Montréal, Henri-Antoine Mézière
- Le Courrier du Bas-Canada, Montréal, 1819, Joseph Victor Delorme, founder, printer, and Michel Bibaud, editor journalist

== 1820–1829 ==
- L'Ami de la religion et du roi, 1820, Trois-Rivières, Ludger Duvernay
- The Enquirer, 1821, Quebec City
- The Scribbler, 1821, Montréal, Samuel Hull Wilcocke, owner and editor, J. Lame, printer
- La Gazette canadienne, 1822, Montréal, Jonh Quilliam
- The Canadian Spectator, 1822, John Jones, editor, Jocelyn Waller, journalist
- The Canadian Times and Weekly Literary and Political Reporter, 1823, Ariel Bowman, printer, Edward Vernon Sparhawk, editor
- Christian Register, 1823, Montréal
- British Colonist and St-Françis Gazette, 1823, Stanstead, S. H. Dickerson
- Le Constitutionnel, 1823, Ludger Duvernay, owner, editor and journalist
- The Canadian Magazine and Literary Repository, 1823, Montréal, Joseph Nickless, owner, David Chisholmes and Alexander James Christie, directors
- The Canadian Review and Literary and Historical Journal, 1824, Montréal, Henry H. Cunningham, owner, David Chisholmes, director
- La Bibliothèque canadienne, ou miscellanées historiques, scientifiques et littéraires 1825, Montréal, Michel Bibaud and Joseph-Marie Bellenger
- La Minerve, 1826, Montréal, Augustin-Norbert Morin, founder, owner, printer and journalist
- L'Argus, Journal electorique, 1826, Trois-Rivières, Ludger Duvernay
- La Gazette de Saint-Philippe, 1826, Saint-Philippe-de-Laprairie, F-X Pigeon, founder
- Journal de médecine de Québec, 1826, Quebec City, Xavier Tessier
- The Christian Sentinel and Anglo-Canadian Churchman's Magazine, 1827
- L'Électeur-The Elector, 1827, François Lemaître
- The Irish Vindicator and Canada General Advertiser, 1828, Montréal, Daniel Tracey, founder, editor, printer and journalist
- Journal des sciences naturelles, 1828, Quebec City, maybe Xavier Tessier
- Le coin du feu, 1829, Montréal, Madame Raoul Dandurand, founder & editor; Jacques Labrie and Augustin-Norbert Morin

== 1830–1839 ==
- L'Observateur 1830, Michel Bibaud, Ludger Duvernay, printer
- Le Magasin du Bas-Canada, Journal littéraire et scientifique 1832, Montréal, Michel Bibaud, Ludger Duvernay, printer
- L'Ami du peuple, de l'ordre et des lois 1832, Montréal, the sulpiciens, John Jones, Pierre-Édouard Leclère
- Montreal Vindicator, 1832, Montréal, Édouard-Raymond Fabre, owner, Edmund Bailey O'Callaghan, journalist
- The Montreal Museum or Journal of Literature and Arts, 1832, Montréal, Mary Graddon Gosselin, editor, Ludger Duvernay, printer
- L'Écho du pays, 1833, Saint-Charles, Pierre-Dominique Debartzch, founder, Alfred-Xavier Rambau, journalist
- L'Abeille canadienne, 1833, Quebec City, François-Xavier Garneau, founder, editor and J-B Fréchette, printer
- L'Impartial, 1834, Laprairie
- Le Glaneur, journal littéraire, d’agriculture et d’industrie, 1836, Saint-Charles (replaces L'Écho du pays)
- Le Télégraphe, 1836, Quebec City, Philippe-Ignace François Aubert de Gaspé and Napoléon Aubin, founders and editors
- Le Populaire, 1837, Montréal, Clément-Charles Sabrevois de Bleury, Léon Gosselin, Pierre-Dominique Debartzch, Hyacinthe Leblanc de Marconnay, chief editor
- Le Fantasque, 1837, Quebec City, Napoléon Aubin, founder and editor
- Le Libéral, 1837, Quebec City
- La Quotidienne, 1837, Montréal, François Lemaître
- Le Temps, 1838, Montréal
- The Literary Garland, 1838, Montréal
- L'Aurore des Canadas, Journal littéraire, politique et commercial, 1839, Montréal, Joseph-Guillaume Barthe, editor

== 1840–1899 ==
- L'Avenir, 1847
- Le Pays, 1852
- Canadian Illustrated News, Montreal, 1869
- The Montreal Evening Star, later The Montreal Star, 1869
- Le Cultivateur, Quebec City, 1974
- The Gazette Megantic Edition, Inverness, 1899–1911

== 1900–1989 ==
- Le Nationaliste, 1904
- Montreal Standard, 1905–1951 (became Weekend)
- Le Cri de l'Est, Matane, 1911
- The Monitor, Montreal, 1926 (converted to online-only in 2009)
- L'Illustration, 1930, Montréal (also known as L'Illustration Nouvelle and Montréal-Matin)
- Dimanche-Matin, 1954, Montreal
- Sunday Express, circa 1973, Montreal
- Le Jour, 1974, Saint-Laurent
- Montreal Daily News, 1988, Montreal
