= Félix Martin =

French historian and antiquarian (1804–1886)

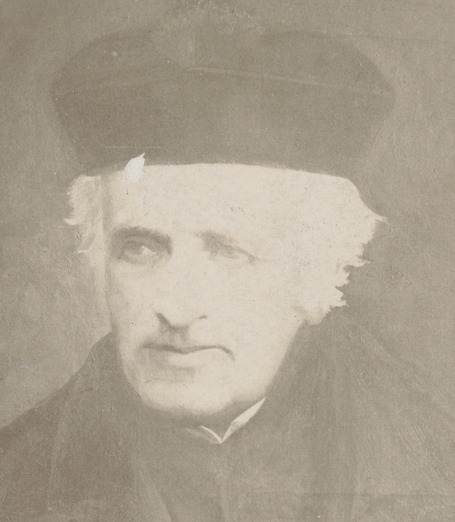

Félix Martin (4 October 1804, in Auray, Morbihan – 25 November 1886 in Vaugirard, Paris) was a Jesuit, antiquary, historiographer, architect, and educationist.

== Early life and work ==
His father, Jacques Augustin Martin, for many years mayor of Auray and Attorney-General of Morbihan, was a public benefactor. His mother was Anne Arnel Lauzer de Kerzo, a pious matron, of whose ten children three entered religious communities, while the others, as heads of families, were highly regarded in Breton society. Felix, having made his classical studies at the Jesuit seminary close by the shrine of St. Anne in Auray, entered the Society of Jesus at Montrouge, Paris, 27 September 1823, but on the opening of a new novitiate at Avignon, in Aug., 1824, he was transferred there. Thence in 1826 he was sent to the one time famous college of Arc, at Dole, to complete his logic and gain his first experience in the management of youth among its 400 pupils. The following scholastic year, 1826–1827, in Saint-Acheul, he began his career as teacher. This was soon to be interrupted, for already among the revolutionists of the boulevards and in the Chamber of Deputies, accusations had been formulated against the Jesuits. This agitation culminated on 16 June 1828, in the "Ordonnances de Charles X" which were to be enforced the following October. The Jesuits, meanwhile, quietly closed their colleges, their teachers went into temporary exile, among them Martin. He spent the succeeding years in colleges established across the frontier.

Martin worked in turn as student and teacher in Brieg and Estavayé in Switzerland; in Spain, Le Passage near San Sebastian; in Belgium, the college of Brugelette. It was when he was in Switzerland, in 1831, that he received Holy orders. Eleven years later, while engaged in the ministry at Angers, he was informed that, under Pierre Chazelle, ex-rector of St. Mary's College, Kentucky, he was chosen together with the Jesuits Hainpaux, Rémi-Joseph Tellier, and Dominique du Ranquet to restore the Society of Jesus in Canada, extinct since the death of Jean-Joseph Casot at Quebec on 16 March 1842. The restoration was under the leadership of Clément Boulanger. On 2 July, Ignace Bourget, at whose invitation the priests had come, confided to them the parish of La Prairie, deprived of its pastor, Michael Power, by his promotion to the newly erected episcopal see of Toronto, 26 June 1842. On 31 July 1844, Martin was named superior of the mission in Lower Canada, now the province of Quebec.

== Work in Canada ==
The citizens of Montreal had generously subscribed towards the building of a college, his principal preoccupation. In May, 1847, ground was broken and the foundations were laid. Then came a series of disasters which interrupted all further work. The greater portion of Laprairie was swept by fire and the presbytery of the fathers was reduced to ashes. The great conflagration of Quebec followed, whereby a vast portion of the city was destroyed. Thousands of Irish immigrants were pouring into the country; in 1847 the numbers reached nearly 100,000. With them they brought the typhus or ship-fever. In that year alone nearly two thousand were stricken down in Montreal. The priests of St. Sulpice, pastors of the city, devoted themselves to the spiritual relief of the sick and dying, and five at the outset fell victims. Jesuits Paul Mignard and Henri du Ranquet, arriving from New York, gave timely assistance. But this was far from sufficient, so Martin appealed to Augustus Thébaud, rector of St. John's, Fordham, for volunteers to assist the plague-stricken. The answer was the immediate arrival of the Jesuits Driscoll, Dumerle, Ferard and Schianski. All escaped the contagion except Dumerle.

The priests of St. Sulpice, whose ranks were thinned by the ravages of the plague, asked for four English-speaking priests to take charge of St. Patrick's Church. A presbytery was provided for them near the very ground whereon the college had been commenced. In it there was room sufficient to house a few teachers. A temporary structure was put up, and opened as a college on 20 September 1848. A few boarders even were received and lodged in a small tenement in a street hard by. It was not till the month of May, 1850, that work was resumed on the college building, but so quickly was it prosecuted that Bourget was invited to bless it, in its advanced stage of completion, on 31 July 1851, feast of St. Ignatius. On 4 August the novitiate was transferred from its temporary quarters in Charles-Séraphin Rodier's house, and installed in the new edifice, and in the beginning of September everything was in perfect working order in the young institution of learning, from under whose roof, in later years, many men were to go forth as statesmen, judges, physicians and members of the clergy and of the bar.

Martin was not only the founder of Collège Sainte-Marie de Montréal (St. Mary's College), the financier, the architect, and the overseer of the material construction, he was also the systematizer of its curriculum during his rectorship which lasted until 1857. For example, in 1851 he established a chair of law there with François-Maximilien Bibaud at its head.

The stately pile of St. Patrick's Church, Montreal, was also of his designing, the main outlines of which are in pure thirteenth-century Gothic. Martin was the originator of the Archives of St. Mary's College, and the principal collector of the records of an almost forgotten past. With such men as Jacques Viger, George-Barthélemy Faribault, Edmund Bailey O'Callaghan, etc., he quickened, if not set on foot, the campaign of research which ended in the placing within reach of all the original historical sources of the colonial and missionary days of New France.

A few months after his death, the "Catholic World" (N. Y., April, 1887), wrote:

"But, it is, perhaps, as an antiquarian and a man of letters that Fr. Martin has become most generally known. His services to historical literature, particularly the history of Canada, have been many and great. He devoted himself amidst all his onerous duties to the task of throwing light on the dark places of the past. He was commissioned by Government to explore the regions where of old the Jesuits had toiled amongst the Hurons, giving at last to the dusky tribes the priceless gifts of faith. He wrote at this time a work embellished with various plans and drawings, all of which remained in possession of the Government. He also collected many curious Indian relics. In 1857 he was sent by the Canadian Government to Europe on a scientific mission, and was likewise entrusted with the task of examining the Archives of Rome and of Paris for points of interest in relation to Canadian history. In this he was eminently successful. He discovered a number of unpublished documents relating to Canada which would be sufficient to fill a folio volume. Perhaps his most eminent service to historical literature was his great share in bringing out the 'Relations des Jésuites' [1611-1672], a very mine of information for the scholar.… He discovered and put into print, with preface and most valuable annotations by himself, the 'Relations' extending from 1672 to 1679. He added to them two geographical charts.… Fr. Martin also translated from Italian to French the 'Relation' of Père Bressani, which he published with notes, together with a biography of that glorious martyr. His historical works included Lives of Samuel de Champlain (?), the founder of Quebec, of Fathers Brébeuf, Chaumonot and Jogues [and, not mentioned in the article, of Montcalm]. The latter [that of Fr. Jogues] has become known to the American public through the translation made by our foremost Catholic historian, John Gilmary Shea. Fr. Martin was the friend, adviser, and co- labourer of the eminent Canadian historical writer, J. Viger."

Letters preserved in the college archives attest that his relations with E. B. O'Callaghan, compiler of the "Documentary History of New York", were of a kindred nature. After his return from Europe, in 1858 and 1859, he was bursar of St. Mary's College, and the two following years, 1860 and 1861, superior of the Quebec residence. His eyesight was already much impaired, and the glare of the Canadian snows was very trying, so much so that he was threatened with total blindness. For this reason he was recalled to France.

== Return to France ==
He spent part of the year 1862 at Ste Geneviève College, Paris, and was appointed on 12 September (1862) rector of the college of Vannes. After three years, on 8 Sept., 1865, he was named superior of the residence of the Holy Name at Poitiers. Thence he was transferred to Vaugirard College in Paris, where he had the spiritual direction of the house for six years. On 5 Sept., 1874, he went to Rouen for three years as superior, and returned to Vaugirard in 1878. At the closing of the Jesuit colleges by the enactments of the French Republic, the community of Vaugirard was dispersed, and Martin, with a few others of his fellows, took up their abode in 1882 at No. 1 Rue Desnouettes. Here he remained for five years, never ceasing to collect materials bearing on the history of the country of his predilection.

== Other publications ==
- Notice Biographique de la Mère S. Stanislas [his sister] Religieuse de la Misericorde de Jésus, de la Hôtel-Dieu d'Auray, 1886
- Manuel du Pélerin à N. D. de Bonsecours
- Neuvaine à St. François Xavier
- Neuvaine à St. Antoine de Padoue
