= Bellenger =

Bellenger may refer to:

- Aidan Bellenger (born 1950), English Benedictine monk
- Étienne Bellenger (fl. 1580–1584), French merchant
- Frederick Bellenger (1894–1968), British surveyor, soldier and politician
- Jacques Bellenger (1927–2020), French Olympic cyclist
- Joseph-Marie Bellenger (1788–1856), Catholic priest
- Romain Bellenger (1894–1981), French road racing cyclist
