= Adolphe Jacquies =

Newspaper publisher and trade unionist (c. 1798 – 1860)

Adolphe Jacquies (c. 1798 – 30 January 1860) was a Canadian shopkeeper, printer, trade unionist, and newspaper publisher in Quebec City.

Born in Bordeaux, he immigrated to Quebec City sometime before 1826. In 1836, he reorganised the Quebec City printers into the Canadian Typographical Union. He became a typographer in 1837 and published a newspaper called Le Fantasque. In 1839, he was arrested for printing a poem in the paper and released afterwards with health complications. He continued printing newspapers and wrote editorials for the Canadian Colonist and Commercial Advertiser. His views were sympathetic to the Parti Patriote and liberal causes. He died in Quebec City.

== Early life ==
Jacquies was born in Bordeaux, France, c. 1798. His father was Hilaire-Jacob Jacquies and his mother was Adélaïde Prahm. Jacquies immigrated to Quebec City sometime before 1826 and opened a confectionery business.

In 1836, Jacquies helped to reorganise the printers in Quebec City into a union, which was eventually called the Canadian Typographical Union. Jacquies convinced 66 members from twelve workshops to join the union and served as its president. The union disbanded eight years later.

== Printing career ==
Jacquies became a typographer and beginning in 1837, he printed the weekly Le Fantasque paper for Napoléon Aubin. In 1839 he was arrested and his press seized for printing a poem in Le Fantasque by Joseph-Guillaume Barthe called Aux exilés politiques canadiens. Jacquies was released later that year after several doctors requested his release. His health was negatively affected by his time in prison, and he struggled with mobility issues for the rest of his life. His printing equipment was returned to him later that year in a damaged condition. In 1852, he was awarded £100 from the rebellion losses commissioners for his treatment during his imprisonment.

Following his release, he started publishing the Canadian Colonist and Commercial Advertiser. The bi-weekly English paper was published for two years. Although most articles in the paper were reprints from other papers, it also contained editorials written by Jacquies. The paper was against the Act of Union that united Upper Canada and Lower Canada into the Province of Canada: the paper published that the process for the province's creation was undemocratic and created a larger civil service. The paper also denounced England's pursuit of free trade policies, believing that Canada needed preferential treatment for England to buy its timber so that they could afford to buy England manufactured goods.

In 1841 Jacquies acquired a Conservative newspaper called British North American and renamed it to the Quebec Argus. He also printed the Quebec Times, another Conservative newspaper. He may have moved to Montreal during this time, as his wife died there in 1847.

== Personal life, ideology, and death ==
Jacquies married Catherine Ponsy in Quebec City on 10 June 1828. They had nine children.

Jacquies was sympathetic to the Parti Patriote, a Francophone liberal party. He promoted workers' rights and liberal ideological ideas including responsible government and unions for workers.

He died in Quebec City on 30 January 1860.
