= St. Patrick's Basilica, Montreal =

Saint Patrick's Basilica
- Basilique Saint-Patrick de Montréal
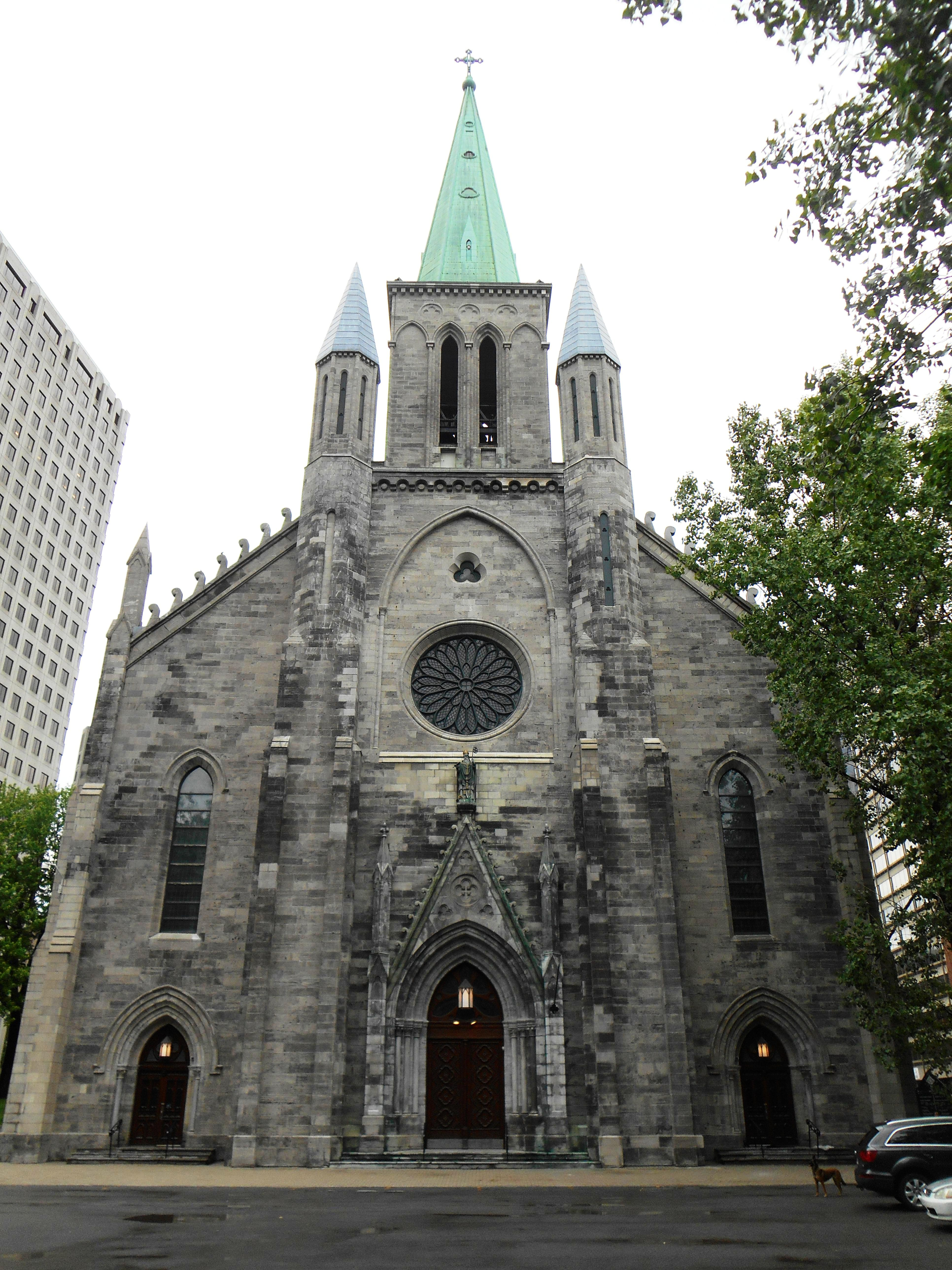
- Exterior view of St. Patrick's
- Saint Patrick's Basilica
- 45.5035°N 73.5647°W
- Location: Montreal, Quebec
- Country: Canada
- Denomination: Roman Catholic

Architecture
- Architect(s): P. L. Morin and Felix Martin
- Style: Gothic Revival
- Groundbreaking: 1843
- Completed: 1847
- Construction cost: $1,000,000

Specifications
- Length: 71 metres (233 ft)
- Width: 32 metres (105 ft)
- Height: 69 metres (226 ft)

National Historic Site of Canada
- Official name: St. Patrick's Basilica National Historic Site of Canada
- Designated: 1990

Administration
- Archdiocese: Roman Catholic Archdiocese of Montreal

Clergy
- Priest: Rev. Msgr. Francis Coyle

Saint Patrick's Basilica (French: Basilique Saint-Patrick de Montréal) is a Roman Catholic minor basilica on René-Lévesque Boulevard in Downtown Montreal, Quebec, Canada.

Pope John Paul II raised the shrine to the status of Minor Basilica via his decree Quæ Per Orbem on 9 December 1988. The decree was signed and notarized by Cardinal Agostino Casaroli.

== History ==
The church is known for its historic links to the Irish Canadian community. St. Patrick's celebrated its 150th anniversary in 1997. French-speaking Catholics first assembled in Montreal at the Notre-Dame-de-Bon-Secours church in Old Montreal; however, their numbers were swelled by the massive arrival of Irish immigrants around 1817. Initially they were transferred to the Church of the Recollets (the French Franciscans) in 1825, but by 1841 they numbered 6,500, and could no longer be accommodated.

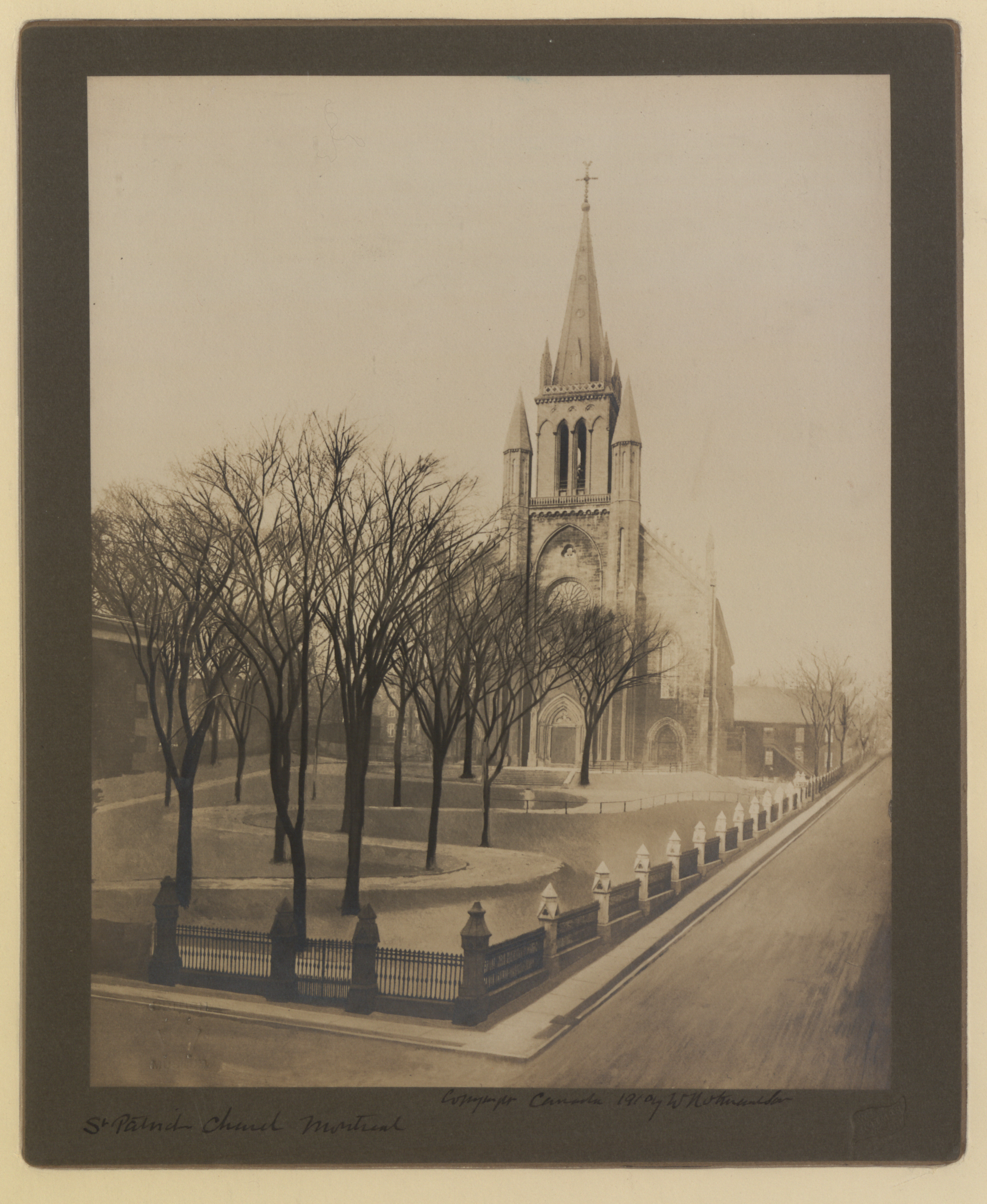
The church in 1910

The site of Saint Patrick's Church was purchased, and construction began in September 1843. What was then the outskirts of the town, on a sloped site overlooking parishioners' homes in Point St. Charles, Goose Village and Griffintown, Saint Patrick's seven cornerstones were laid, making it the oldest English-speaking Roman Catholic Church in Montreal. The first mass was celebrated in the church on St. Patrick's Day, March 17, 1847, and in 1850 Samuel Russell Warren built the church's first organ. Adélard Joseph Boucher was the organist from 1853 to 1858, Joseph-A. Fowler followed (1868–1908) and was briefly preceded by Benoît Poirier.

The Quebec government designated the church a historic monument on December 10, 1985. It has also been designated a National Historic Site of Canada.

April 4, 1985 the Quebec Government deemed the church as a Historical Monument and in 1996 was named a National Historic site of Canada.

On St. Patrick's Day, March 17, 1989, the church was inaugurated to the public from its 1988 conferment of minor basilica by Pope John Paul II, upon request by former Archbishop of Montreal, Cardinal Paul Grégoire.

== Architecture ==
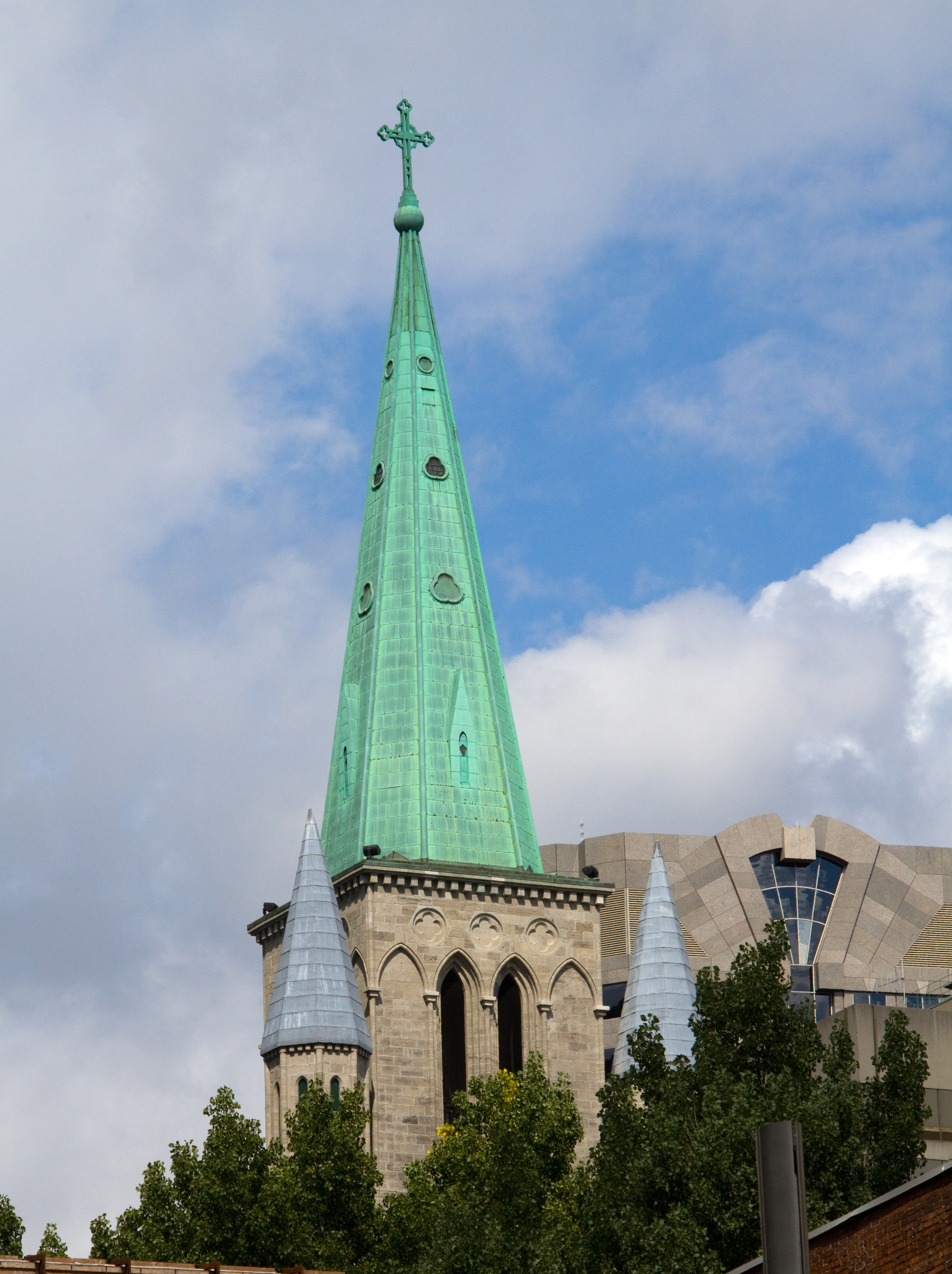
The steeple of the basilica, which stands at 69 metres (226 ft)

The Gothic Revival building, designed by P. L. Morin and Father Felix Martin, is 71 metres (233 ft) long and 32 metres (105 ft) wide; the steeple reaches a height of 69 metres (226 ft). It is considered one of the most magnificent examples of its style in Canada.

=== Interior ===
The interior is heavily ornamented with motifs that combine a French fleur de lys and Irish shamrocks; more striking are the 25-metre (82 ft) columns, all carved from the same white oak and painted to appear as marble. It features three altars, four rosette stained-glass windows (designed by New York artist Alex S. Locke) and features 150 oil paintings of saints. St. Patrick's Basilica has a Casavant Frères pipe organ (1895), which was completely electropneumatic.

Two additions to the decorations have been made since St. Patrick's completion, first in 1922 by Guido Nincheri and again in 1931 by Victor Marion.

The large lamp hanging in the sanctuary is unique in North America. Weighing 1800 pounds, (815 kg), it was installed in 1896. Each of the six angels on the pedestal stands 2 m high.

—

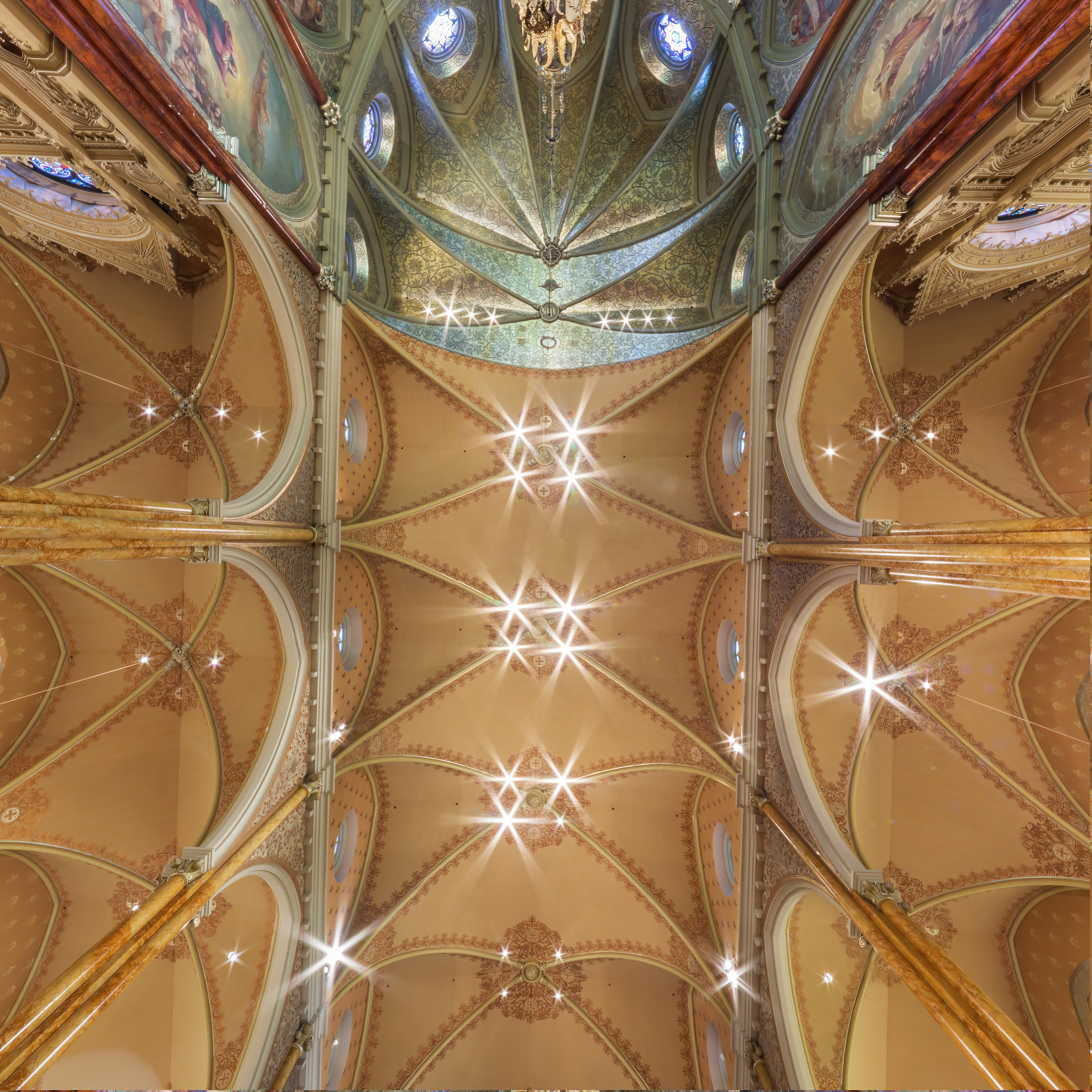
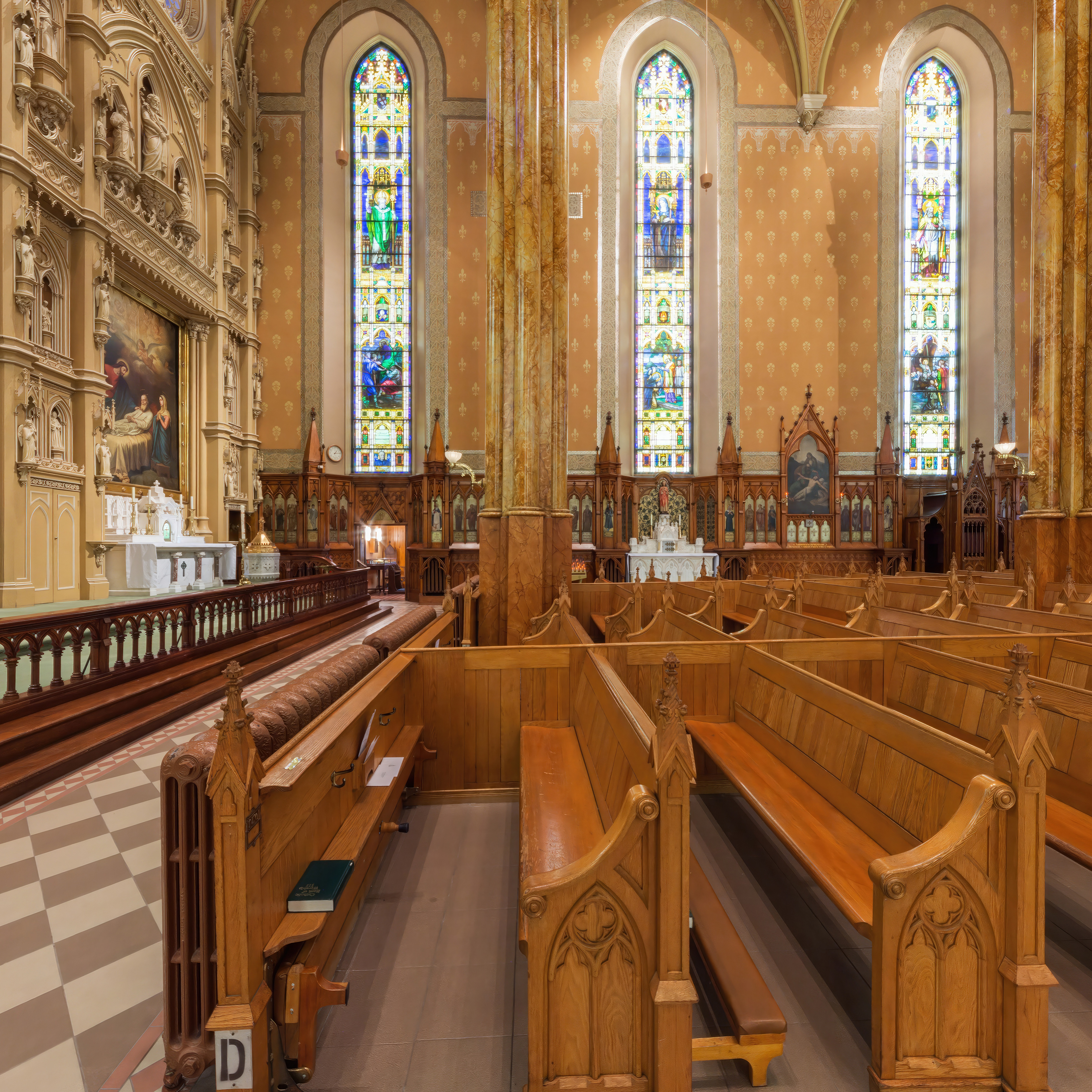
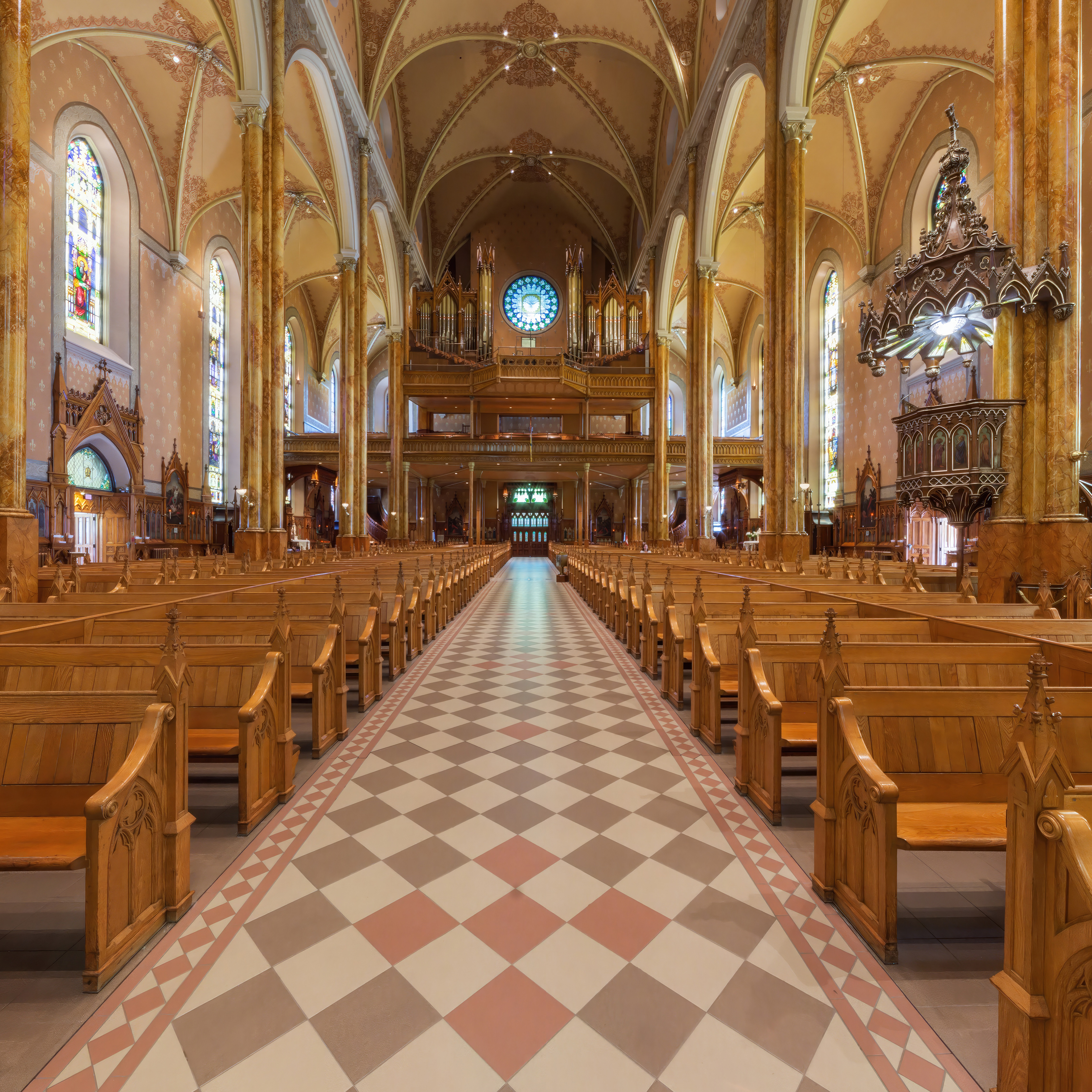
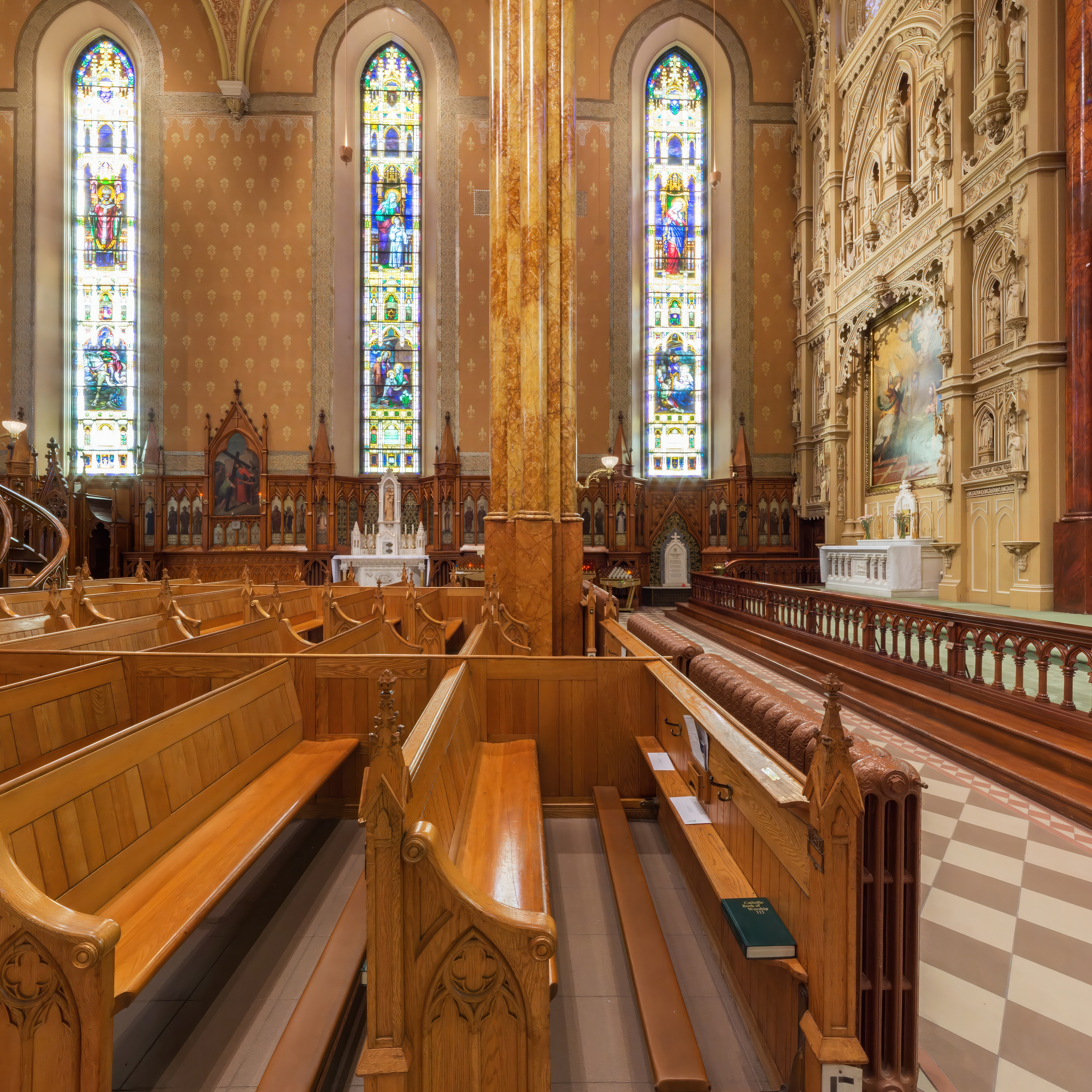
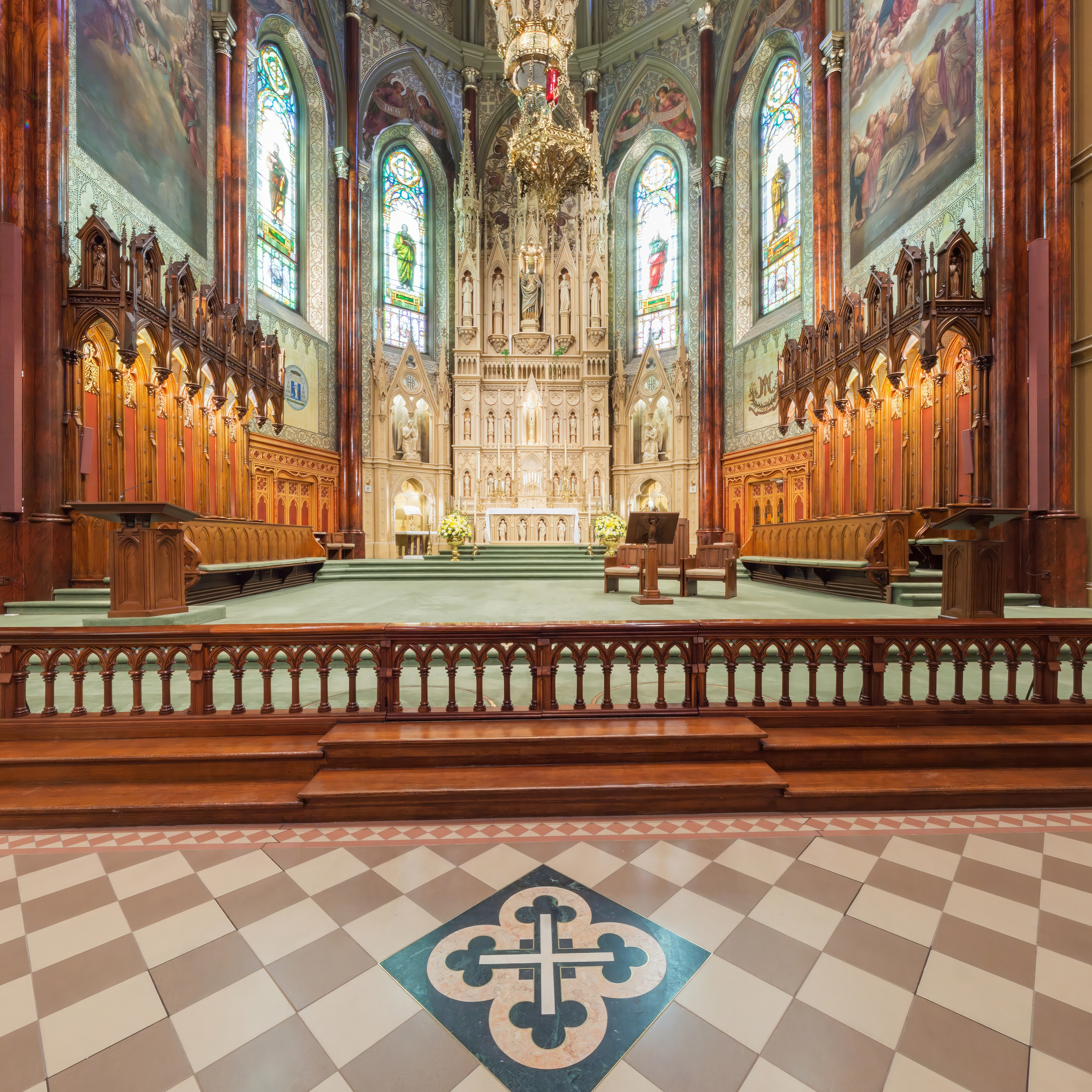
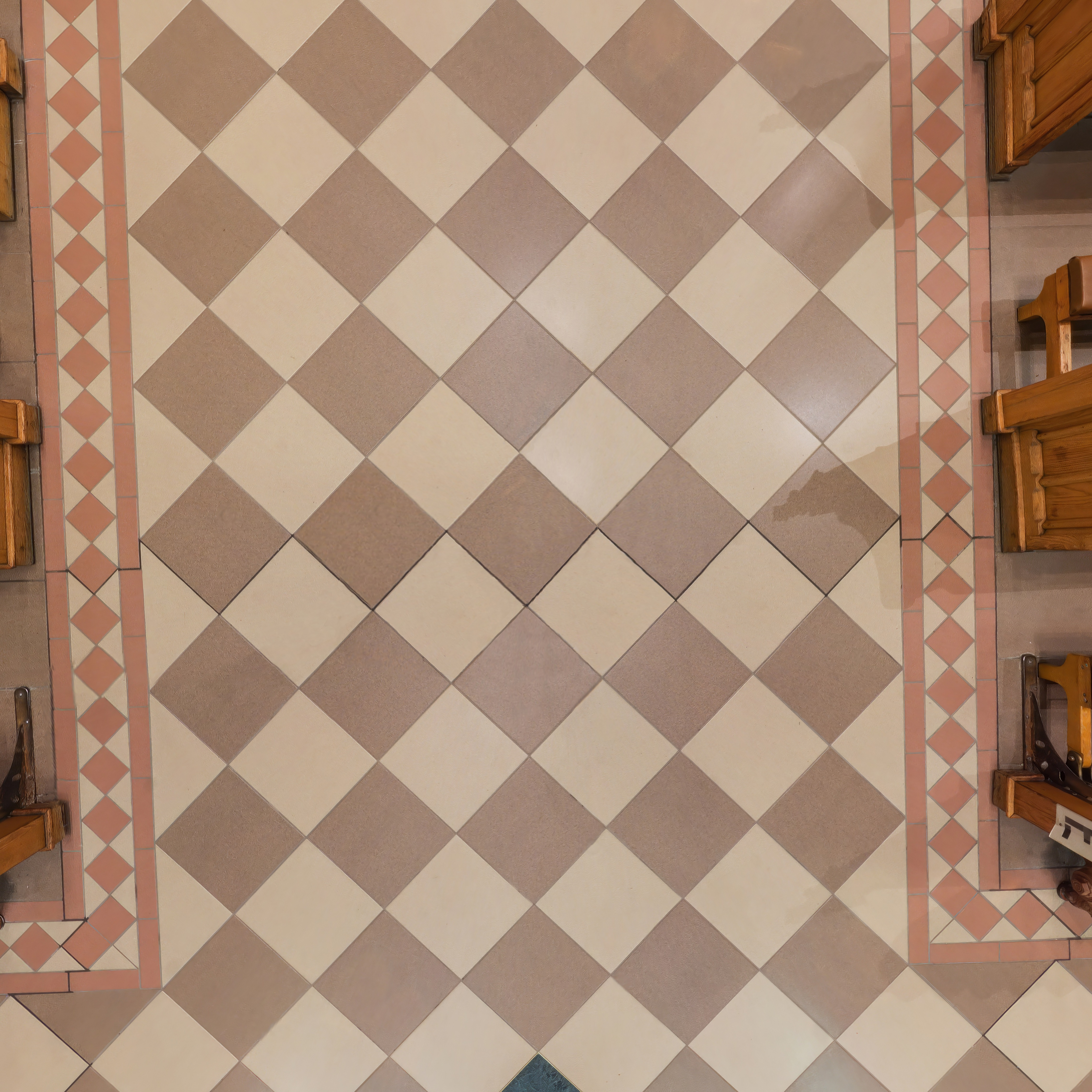
Interior of the basilica.

The church is known for "St. Patrick's Chimes," its ten bells, of which the oldest, "Charlotte," was cast in 1774 and used in the previous church of Notre-Dame. The bell system was restored in 1989. The organ was installed in 1852 and has been successively rebuilt several times. In 1972, it was combined with the organ of St. Antony's Church, also of Montreal, which had been demolished. St. Patrick's has undergone four major restorations since its construction, the most recent of which cost $5 million through donations from citizens, corporations and the Quebec Government which contributed $1.4 million.

Inside the church are memorials to two famous parishioners. Pew 240, used by Thomas D'Arcy McGee, a statesman and Father of Confederation who was assassinated in 1868 in Ottawa. In the rear of the church, a plaque commemorates poet Émile Nelligan's baptism in the church Christmas Day 1879.

The wrought iron fence, punctuated by Gothic Revival style carved stone pilasters, was made by the firm H. R. Ives & Co. of Montreal in the 1890s.

The church is located at 460 René Lévesque Boulevard West, in downtown Montreal, at the corner of Saint-Alexandre Street (Square-Victoria-OACI or Place-des-Arts metro stations).

== See also ==
- List of basilicas in Canada

== Bibliography ==
"Basilique St. Patrick's Basilica, Montreal, QC." Universite du Quebec (Quebec, Canada). Web. 15 Feb. 2011. <https://web.archive.org/web/20120306153059/http://infopuq.uquebec.ca/~uss1010/orgues/quebec/spatricksm.html#English>.

Hustak, Alan. "Saint Patrick's of Montreal: the biography of a basilica. Montréal": Véhicule Press, 1998. Print.

Leitch, Gillian Irene. “Community and Identity in Nineteenth Century Montreal: The Founding of Saint Patrick’s Church.” University of Ottawa Canada, 2009.
