= Mechanics Hall =

Mechanics Hall or Mechanics' Hall may refer to one of the following meeting halls:

== United States ==
Listed alphabetically by state

- Mechanics' Hall (Portland, Maine)
- Mechanics Hall (Boston, Massachusetts), on Huntington Avenue (1881–1959)
  - Not to be confused with an earlier Mechanics Hall on Bedford Street (1860s–1870s); see Massachusetts Charitable Mechanic Association
- Mechanics Hall (Worcester, Massachusetts)
  - Mechanics' Hall District, located here
- Mechanics' Hall (New York City), New York

== Elsewhere ==
- Mechanics' Hall (Toronto), in Ontario, Canada

== See also ==
- Burnley Mechanics Theatre, in Burnley, Lancashire, England
- Mechanics' Theatre, in Dublin, Ireland
