= Jean-Baptiste Labelle =

Canadian composer, organist, pianist and conductor

Jean-Baptiste Labelle (September 1825 – 9 September 1898) was a Canadian composer, organist, pianist, and conductor. He is best known for composing the music to the song Ô Canada! mon pays, mes amours (words 1834, music before 1868) with words by George-Étienne Cartier. He also used words by Cartier for the song Avant tout je suis Canadien (1860). Some of his other notable works include the cantatas Cantate: La Confédération (1868) and La Croisade canadienne (1886); the operetta La Conversion d'un pêcheur de la Nouvelle-Écosse (published by the A.J. Boucher Co. in 1868); the piano pieces Marche canadienne (1846) and Quadrille national canadien; and the song Chant des Zouaves canadiens (1881).

== Life and career ==
Born to Canadian parents in Burlington, Vermont, Labelle was baptized in Montreal on 13 November 1825. He received his earliest musical training in that city from string instrumentalist and instrument maker Joseph Lyonnais. He later studied under Austrian pianist Leopold von Meyer from 1845 to 1847. From 1843 to 1846 he worked as a church organist in Boucherville. He then worked in the same capacity at a church in Chambly, Quebec from 1846 to 1849.

In 1849, Labelle returned to Montreal to assume the post of organist at Notre-Dame Basilica. He continued in that job up until his retirement in 1891 when he was succeeded by Alcibiade Béique. During his 42 years Notre-Dame Church he also taught at several schools and institutions in Montreal, including the Collège de Montréal, the Collège Mont-Saint-Louis, the Collège Sainte-Marie de Montréal, the École Normale de Musique de Montréal, and schools at the convents of Villa Maria and Mont-Saint-Marie in Montreal and at the convent of Mont-Ste-Anne in Lachine.

In 1855, Labelle began a side business as an importer of pianos and a music dealer. In December 1856 – January 1857 he studied the piano in Boston with Sigismund Thalberg. He toured the United States and South America in 1857 and in November of that year organized concerts of selected works by Adolphe Adam, Vincenzo Bellini, Gaetano Donizetti, Giacomo Meyerbeer, and Franz Schubert at Mechanics' Hall in Montreal under the title "Grand Operatic Concert". He served as the conductor of the Société philharmonique canadienne of Montreal in 1863.

Labelle died in Montreal in 1898 around the time of his 73rd birthday and was entombed at the Notre Dame des Neiges Cemetery. He had previously suffered from an illness in December 1896 which had left him paralysed for the last couple years of his life.
