= Adélard Joseph Boucher =

Canadian musician and writer (1835–1912)

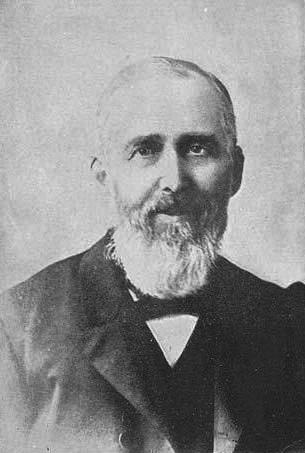
Adélard Joseph Boucher

Adélard Joseph François-Arthur Boucher (28 June 1835 – 16 November 1912) was a Canadian publisher, importer, choirmaster, organist, conductor, writer on music, composer and numismatist. In 1865 he founded the A.J. Boucher Co. in Montreal which published the works of Canadian and foreign composers until it closed in 1975. In 1862, he founded the Société de numismatique de Montréal, serving as the organization's first president. He composed several works for solo piano, of which his most well known are Coecilia, a mazurka caprice; Les Canotiers du St-Laurent, a 'quadrille canadien'; Jolly Dogs Galop; and Souvenir de Sabatier, a suite of waltzes. Most of his compositions were written and published before 1866.

== Early life and education ==
Born in Maskinongé, then in Lower Canada, Boucher's parents died in 1845 when he was 10 years old. He spent the next six years living and studying at the St. Joseph's College and Mother Seton Shrine in Emmitsburg, Maryland. He was particularly influenced by his music teacher at the school, Henry Dielman, who instructed him in the organ, piano, flute, violin, and singing. He then was a pupil at the Séminaire d'Issy-les-Moulineaux near Paris where his foster father, Antoine LaRocque, enrolled him in September 1851. In March 1852, he became a novitiate in the Society of Jesus in Amiens. He returned to Canada the following August where he continued to spend time with the Jesuits for the next six months.

== Early career ==
Although interested in the religious life, Boucher eventually decided to abandon this career path in order to pursue other interests. After studying law, he became an employee of the Montreal and Bytown Railway where he was later appointed the company's secretary-treasurer in 1854. From 1855 to 1858 he worked for the Commission seigneuriale as a registrar. He then worked for the Trust & Loan Co. as a broker from 1855 to 1859.

During the 1850s, Boucher spent time studying genealogy, music, and numismatics, all of which remained lifelong interests. He taught part-time at the Collège Sainte-Marie de Montréal and the school at the Villa-Maria Convent as an instructor in piano and voice. In 1853 he was appointed organist at St. Patrick's Basilica, Montreal where he remained until 1858 when he was appointed to the same position at Saint-Pierre Church. At Saint-Pierre he founded and directed a choir school. In 1860 he founded the Société Ste-Cécile. That same year he became organist at Saint-Jacques Cathedral, later adding the role of choirmaster to his responsibilities there in 1865.

In 1862, Boucher founded the Société de numismatique de Montréal, serving as the organization's first president. He sold his collection of more than 1,700 coins in 1866. In 1863, he founded the short-lived monthly magazine Les Beaux-Arts with a Mr Manseau and Gustave Smith. In 1866, he founded the monthly periodical Le Canada Musical which was first published from 1 September 1866 to 1 August 1867 and later from 1 May 1875 to 1 April 1881. He also founded the Orphéon canadien and the Société Mozart in Montreal.

== Work in publishing and later career ==
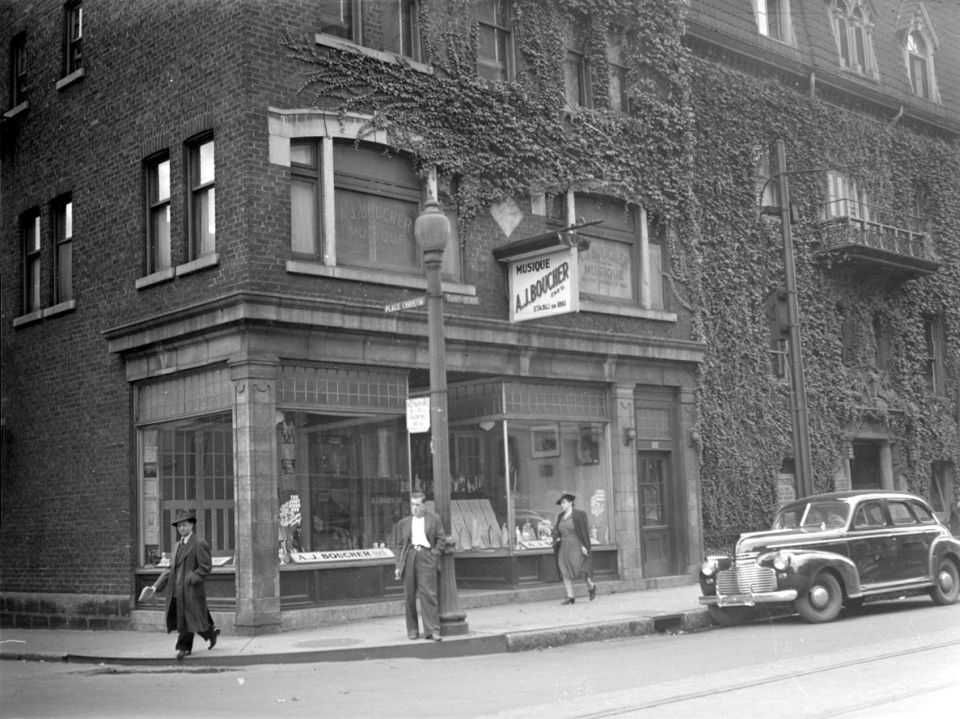
A.J. Boucher music store at the intersection of Saint Denis Street and the place Christin (now Christin Street) in Montreal. We notice scores and religious statues in the window.

In 1861, Boucher made his first forray into the music publishing business when he joined the staff of Laurent et Laforce (later Laurent, Laforce & Bourdeau), a newly established publishing and importing house in Montreal. At that time published French music was difficult to obtain in Canada and Boucher joined the company in hopes of remedying this problem. In 1862, he and Manseau established their own publishing company, "Boucher et Manseau", after purchasing a controlling interest in Laurent et Laforce. The two companies shared premises through 1864.

In 1865, Boucher disbanded Boucher et Manseau and founded a publishing company under his own name, the "A.J. Boucher Co." Initially the company only sold sheet music, but expanded to include instruments in 1878. The instrument portion of the business was first run by René Hudon who later became the husband of his eldest daughter, Philomène. It was then taken over by Louis-Étienne-Napoléon Pratte in 1879. Pratte later married Boucher's daughter Cécile and became a successful piano manufacturer. The company established partnerships with several European and American publishers and published the works of Canadian and foreign composers until it closed in 1975. Among the Canadian composers Boucher published were Calixa Lavallée, Alexis Contant, Ernest Gagnon, Jean-Baptiste Labelle, Eugène Lapierre, Roméo Larivière, Alfred Mignault, Albertine Morin-Labrecque, Joseph-Julien Perrault, and Charles Wugk Sabatier.

In May 1867, Boucher acquired the Gould & Hill publishing company which he continued to operate independently of the A.J. Boucher Co. for a number of years. With violinist and music critic Arthur Lavigne he opened a music store in Quebec City in 1868. That same year he left the post of organist/choirmaster at Saint-Jacques Cathedral to become choirmaster at the Gesù Church where he remained until 1888.

During the 1860s and 1870s, Boucher conducted several public concerts in Montreal, many of them with orchestra. He presented performances of Gioachino Rossini's Stabat Mater (1860, 1868), Sabatier's Cantata (1862), David's Le désert (1866), Vincenzo Bellini's La sonnambula (1867), Michael William Balfe's The Bohemian Girl (1867), Gaetano Donizetti's The Daughter of the Regiment (1867, 1882), and Charles Gounod's Gallia (1879). He also conducted many choral concerts. In December 1870 he conducted a concert commemorating the centenary of Ludwig van Beethoven's birth at St-Patrice Hall with a 100 voice choir and an orchestra of 30.

== Personal life ==
In 1854, Boucher married soprano Philomène Rousseau with whom he had 15 children. She often performed as a soloist in his concert presentations, notably portraying Amina in performances of Vincenzo Bellini's La sonnambula under his baton. Their eldest son, François Boucher, was a violinist, and their son Joseph-Arthur Boucher was a notable bassist, conductor, choirmaster, and bandmaster.

Having never retired, Boucher died in Outremont, Quebec, in 1912 and was entombed at the Notre Dame des Neiges Cemetery in Montreal. His eldest daughter Philomène took over the management of A.J. Boucher Co. after his death. She in turn was succeeded by her daughter Mme Joséphine Boucher-Ouimet, who led the company until her death in April 1975. A.J. Boucher Co. closed its doors in May 1975 after 113 years of business.
