= Richard Hakluyt =

English author, editor and translator (1553–1616)

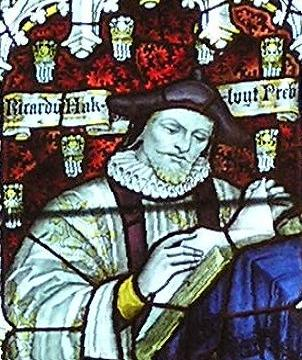
- Hakluyt depicted in stained glass in the west window of the south transept of Bristol Cathedral, by Charles Eamer Kempe, c. 1905
- Born: 1553; Hereford, Herefordshire; or London, England
- Died: 23 November 1616 (aged 64); London, England
- Occupations: Author, editor and translator
- Writing career
- Period: 1580–1609
- Subjects: Exploration; geography; travel

Signature
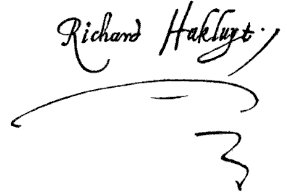

Richard Hakluyt (/ˈhæklʊt, ˈhæklət, ˈhækəlwɪt/; 1553 – 23 November 1616) was an English writer and priest. He is known for promoting the English colonization of North America through his works, notably Divers Voyages Touching the Discoverie of America (1582) and The Principal Navigations, Voyages, Traffiques and Discoveries of the English Nation (1589–1600).

Hakluyt was educated at Westminster School and Christ Church, Oxford. Between 1583 and 1588 he was chaplain and secretary to Sir Edward Stafford, English ambassador at the French court. An ordained priest, Hakluyt held important positions at Bristol Cathedral and Westminster Abbey and was personal chaplain to Robert Cecil, 1st Earl of Salisbury, principal Secretary of State to Elizabeth I and James I. He was the chief promoter of a petition to James I for letters patent to colonize Virginia, which were granted to the London Company and Plymouth Company (referred to collectively as the Virginia Company) in 1606. The Hakluyt Society, which publishes scholarly editions of primary records of voyages and travels, was named after him in its 1846 formation.

== Biography ==
=== Family, early life and education ===
Hakluyt's patrilineal ancestors were of Welsh extraction, rather than Dutch as is often suggested; they appear to have settled in Herefordshire in England around the 13th century, and, according to antiquary John Leland, took their surname from the "Forest of Cluid in Radnorland". Some of Hakluyt's ancestors established themselves at Yatton in Herefordshire, and must have ranked amongst the principal landowners of the county. A person named Hugo Hakelute, who may have been an ancestor or relative of Richard Hakluyt, was elected Member of Parliament for the borough of Yatton in 1304 or 1305, and between the 14th and 16th centuries five individuals surnamed "de Hackluit" or "Hackluit" were sheriffs of Herefordshire. A man named Walter Hakelut was knighted in the 34th year of Edward I (1305) and later killed at the Battle of Bannockburn, and in 1349 Thomas Hakeluyt was chancellor of the diocese of Hereford. Records also show that a Thomas Hakeluytt was in the wardship of Henry VIII (reigned 1509–1547) and Edward VI (reigned 1547–1553).

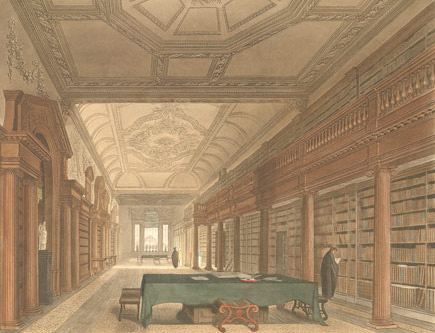
The library of Christ Church, Oxford, by an unknown artist, from Rudolph Ackermann's History of Oxford (1813)

Richard Hakluyt, the second of four sons, was born in Eyton in Herefordshire in 1553. Hakluyt's father, also named Richard Hakluyt, was a member of the Worshipful Company of Skinners whose members dealt in skins and furs. He died in 1557 when his son was aged about five years, and his wife Margery followed soon after. Hakluyt's cousin, also named Richard Hakluyt, of the Middle Temple, became his guardian.

While a Queen's Scholar at Westminster School, Hakluyt visited his guardian, whose conversation, illustrated by "certain bookes of cosmographie, an universall mappe, and the Bible", made Hakluyt resolve to "prosecute that knowledge, and kind of literature". Entering Christ Church, Oxford, in 1570 with financial support from the Skinners' Company, "his exercises of duty first performed", he set out to read all the printed or written voyages and discoveries that he could find. He took his Bachelor of Arts (B.A.) on 19 February 1574, and shortly after taking his Master of Arts (M.A.) on 27 June 1577, began giving public lectures in geography. He was the first to show "both the old imperfectly composed and the new lately reformed mappes, globes, spheares, and other instruments of this art". Hakluyt held on to his studentship at Christ Church between 1577 and 1586, although after 1583 he was no longer resident in Oxford.

Hakluyt was ordained in 1578, the same year he began to receive a "pension" from the Worshipful Company of Clothworkers to study divinity. The pension would have lapsed in 1583, but William Cecil, 1st Baron Burghley, intervened to have it extended until 1586 to aid Hakluyt's geographical research.

=== At the English Embassy in Paris ===
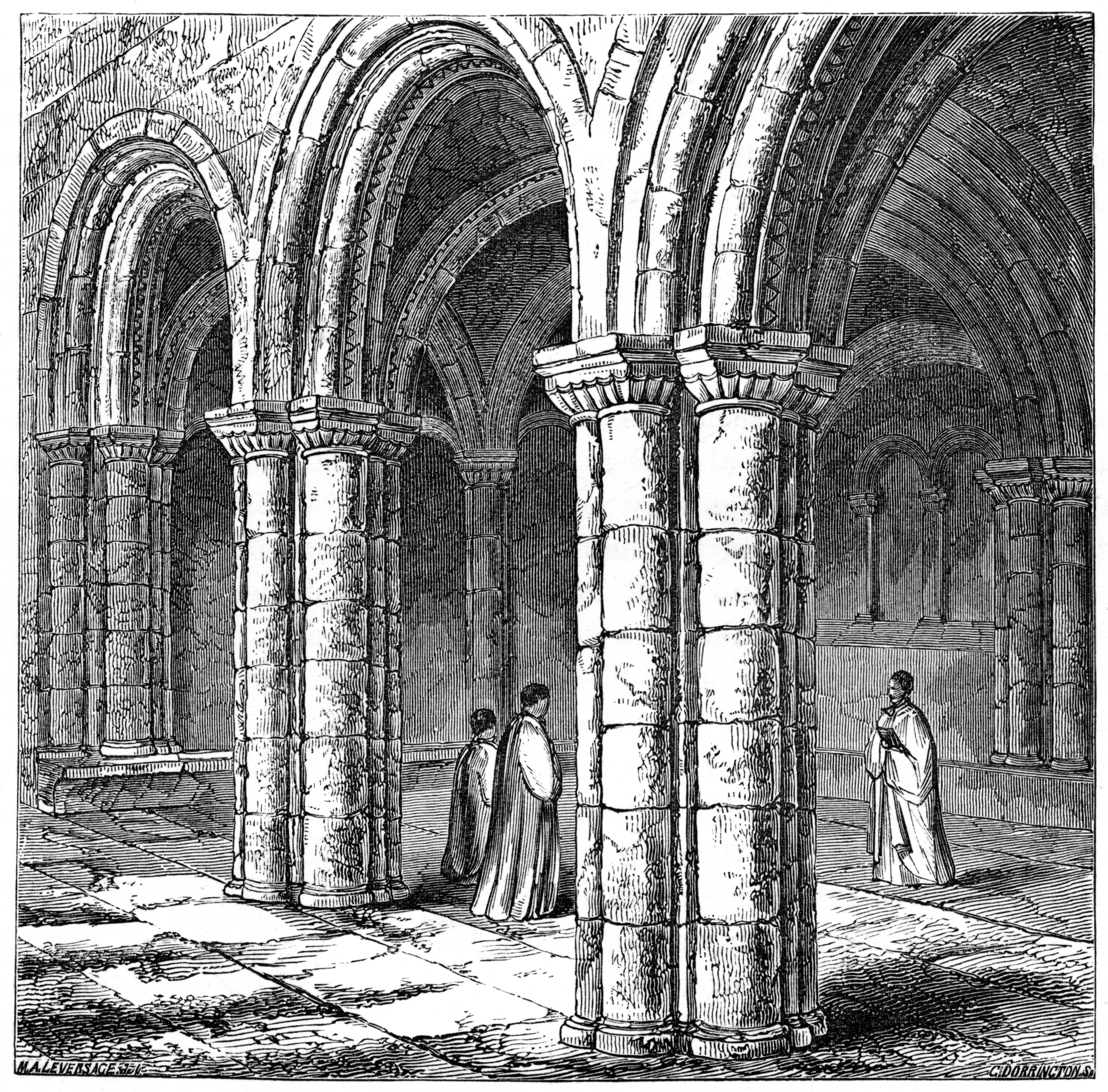
The Norman chapter house of Bristol Cathedral (engraving from 1882). Hakluyt was a member of the chapter.

Hakluyt's first publication was one that he wrote himself, Divers Voyages Touching the Discoverie of America and the Ilands Adjacent unto the Same, Made First of all by our Englishmen and Afterwards by the Frenchmen and Britons (1582).

Hakluyt's Voyages brought him to the notice of Lord Howard of Effingham, and Sir Edward Stafford, Lord Howard's brother-in-law. At the age of 30, being acquainted with "the chiefest captaines at sea, the greatest merchants, and the best mariners of our nation", he was selected as chaplain and secretary to accompany Stafford, now English ambassador at the French court, to Paris in 1583. In accordance with the instructions of Secretary Francis Walsingham, he occupied himself chiefly in collecting information of the Spanish and French movements, and "making diligent inquirie of such things as might yield any light unto our westerne discoveries in America". Although this was his only visit to Continental Europe in his life, he was angered to hear the limitations of the English in terms of travel being discussed in Paris.

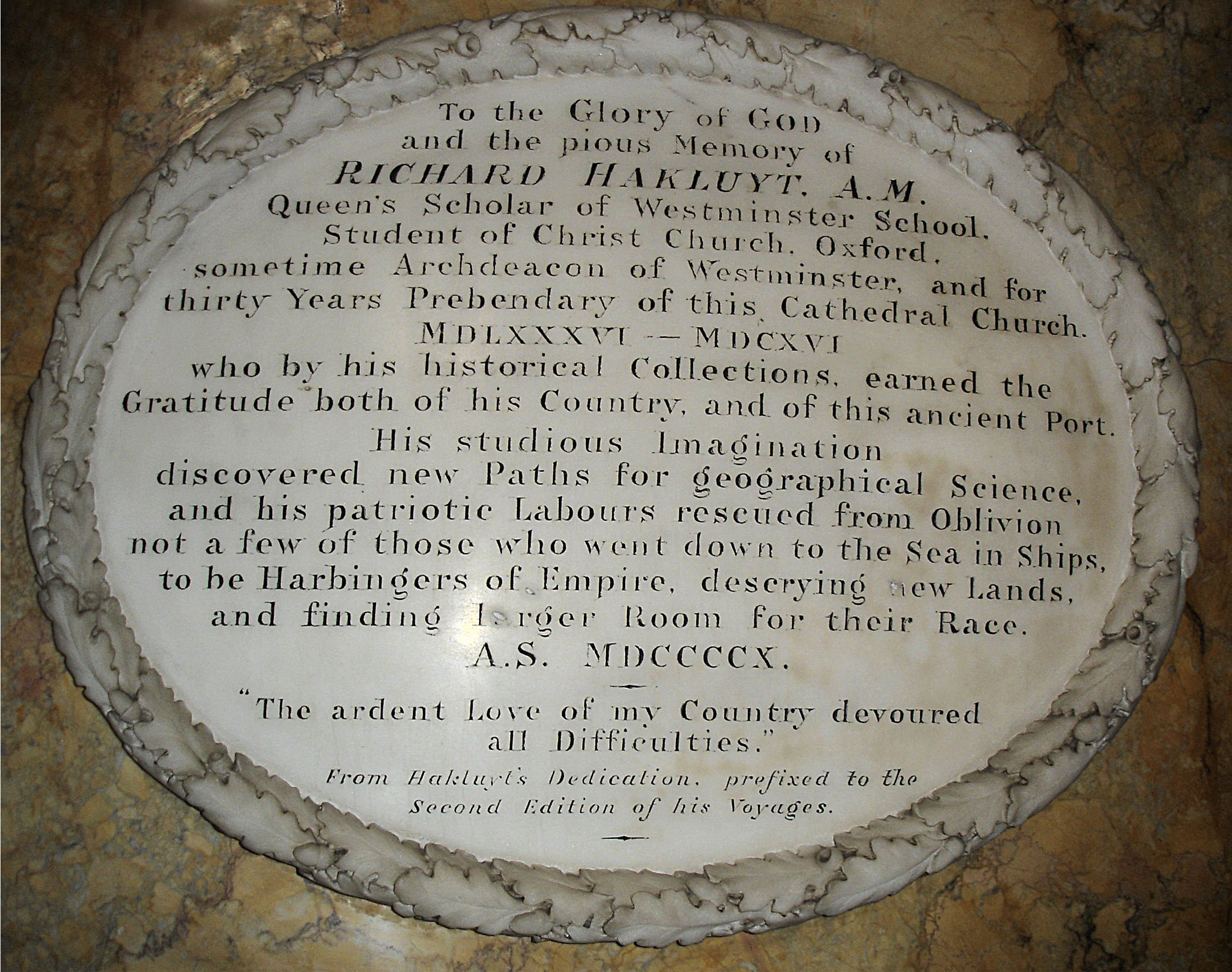
A 1910 memorial tablet to Hakluyt in Bristol Cathedral

The first fruits of Hakluyt's labours in Paris were embodied in his important work entitled A Particuler Discourse Concerninge the Greate Necessitie and Manifolde Commodyties That Are Like to Growe to This Realme of Englande by the Westerne Discoueries Lately Attempted, Written in the Yere 1584, which Sir Walter Raleigh commissioned him to prepare. The manuscript, lost for almost 300 years, was published for the first time in 1877. Hakluyt revisited England in 1584, and laid a copy of the Discourse before Elizabeth I (to whom it had been dedicated) together with his analysis in Latin of Aristotle's Politicks. His objective was to recommend the enterprise of establishing English plantations in the region of North America not yet colonized by Europeans, and thus gain the Queen's support for Raleigh's expedition. In May 1585 when Hakluyt was in Paris with the English Embassy, the Queen granted to him the next prebendary at Bristol Cathedral that should become vacant, to which he was admitted in 1585 or 1586 and held with other preferments till his death.

Hakluyt's other works during his time in Paris consisted mainly of translations and compilations, with his own dedications and prefaces. These latter writings, together with a few letters, are the only extant material out of which a biography of him can be framed. Hakluyt interested himself in the publication of the manuscript journal of René Goulaine de Laudonnière, L'histoire notable de la Floride située ès Indes Occidentales in Paris in 1586. The attention that the book excited in Paris encouraged Hakluyt to prepare an English translation and publish it in London under the title A Notable Historie Containing Foure Voyages Made by Certayne French Captaynes unto Florida (1587). The same year, his edition of Peter Martyr d'Anghiera's De Orbe Nouo Decades Octo saw the light at Paris. This work contains an exceedingly rare copperplate map dedicated to Hakluyt and signed F. G. (supposed to be Francis Gualle); it is the first on which the name "Virginia" appears.

=== Return to England ===
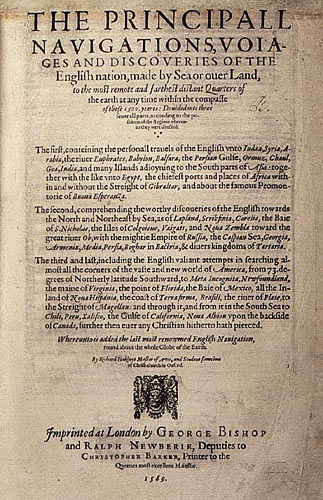
The title page of the first edition of Hakluyt's The Principall Navigations, Voiages, and Discoveries of the English Nation (1589)

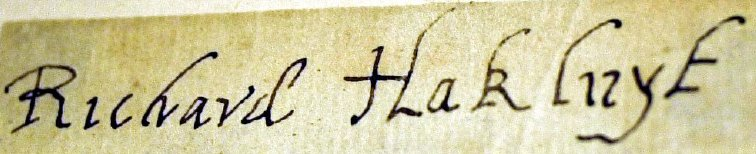
A manuscript signature of Hakluyt from the front flyleaf of the above work

In 1588 Hakluyt finally returned to England with Douglas Sheffield, Baroness Sheffield, after a residence in France of nearly five years. In 1589 he published the first edition of his chief work, The Principall Navigations, Voiages and Discoveries of the English Nation, using eyewitness accounts as far as possible. In the preface to this he announced the intended publication of the first terrestrial globe made in England by Emery Molyneux.

Between 1598 and 1600 appeared the final, reconstructed and greatly enlarged edition of The Principal Navigations, Voiages, Traffiques and Discoueries of the English Nation in three volumes. In the dedication of the second volume (1599) to his patron, Robert Cecil, 1st Earl of Salisbury, Hakluyt strongly urged the minister as to the expediency of colonising Virginia. A few copies of this monumental work contain a map of great rarity, the first on the Mercator projection made in England according to the true principles laid down by Edward Wright. Hakluyt's great collection has been called "the Prose Epic of the modern English nation" by historian James Anthony Froude.

On 20 April 1590 Hakluyt was instituted to the clergy house of Wetheringsett-cum-Brockford, Suffolk, by Lady Stafford, who was the Dowager Baroness Sheffield. He held this position until his death, and resided in Wetheringsett through the 1590s and frequently thereafter. In 1599, he became an adviser to the newly-founded East India Company, and in 1601 he edited a translation from the Portuguese of Antonio Galvão's The Discoveries of the World.

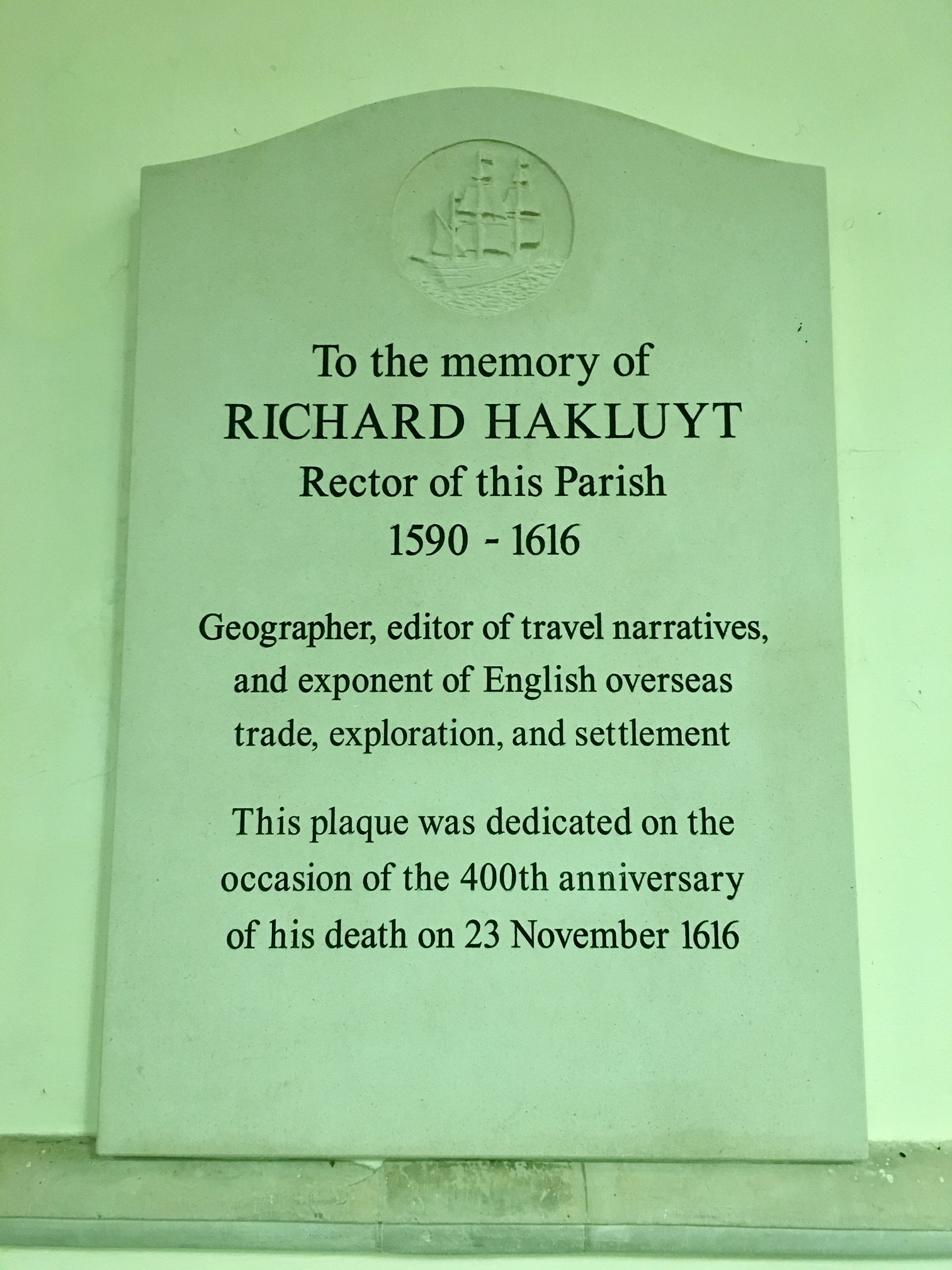
Modern memorial to Richard Hakluyt in the chancel of All Saints' Church, Wetheringsett, Suffolk

=== Later life ===
In the late 1590s Hakluyt became the client and personal chaplain of Robert Cecil, 1st Earl of Salisbury, Lord Burghley's son, who was to be Hakluyt's most fruitful patron. Hakluyt dedicated to Cecil the second (1599) and third volumes (1600) of the expanded edition of Principal Navigations and also his edition of Galvão's Discoveries (1601). Cecil, who was the principal Secretary of State to Elizabeth I and James I, rewarded him by installing him as prebendary of the Dean and Chapter of Westminster on 4 May 1602. In the following year, he was elected archdeacon of the Abbey. These religious occupations have occasioned reconsideration of the role played by spiritual concerns in Hakluyt's writings on exploration, settlement, and England's relations with its Catholic rivals.

Hakluyt was married twice, once in or about 1594 and again in 1604. In the licence of Hakluyt's second marriage dated 30 March 1604, he is described as one of the chaplains of the Savoy Hospital; this position was also conferred on him by Cecil. His will refers to chambers occupied by him there up to the time of his death, and in another official document he is styled Doctor of Divinity (D.D.).

Hakluyt was also a leading adventurer of the Charter of the Virginia Company of London as a director thereof in 1589. In 1605 he secured the prospective living of Jamestown, the intended capital of the intended colony of Virginia. When the colony was at last established in 1607, he supplied this benefice with its chaplain, Robert Hunt. In 1606 he appears as the chief promoter of the petition to James I for letters patent to colonise Virginia, which were granted on 10 April 1606. His last publication was a translation of Hernando de Soto's discoveries in Florida, entitled Virginia Richly Valued, by the Description of the Maine Land of Florida, Her Next Neighbour (1609). This work was intended to encourage the young colony of Virginia; Scottish historian William Robertson wrote of Hakluyt, "England is more indebted for its American possessions than to any man of that age."

Hakluyt prepared an English translation of Dutch jurist Hugo Grotius' Mare Liberum (1609), a treatise that sought to demonstrate that the Dutch had the right to trade freely in the East Indies, contrary to Spanish and Portuguese claims of sovereignty over the seas, in the early 17th century. Helen Thornton has suggested that the translation was commissioned by Thomas Smythe who became treasurer of the Virginia Company in 1609 and was also Governor of the East India Company. In that year, Hakluyt was a consultant to the Company when it was renewing its charter. Grotius' arguments supported England's right to trade in the Indies. The translation may also have been part of the propaganda encouraging English people to settle in Virginia. In Mare Liberum, Grotius denied that the 1493 donation by Pope Alexander VI that had divided the oceans between Spain and Portugal entitled Spain to make territorial claims to North America. Instead, he stressed the importance of occupation, which was favourable to the English as they and not the Spanish had occupied Virginia. Grotius also argued that the seas should be freely navigable by all, which was useful since the England to Virginia route crossed seas which the Portuguese claimed. However, it is not clear why Hakluyt's translation was not published in his lifetime. George Bruner Parks has theorized that publication at that time would have been inconvenient to England because after England had successfully helped the Netherlands and Spain to negotiate the Twelve Years' Truce during the Eighty Years' War, the work would have supported English claims for free seas against Spain, but not its claims for closed seas against Netherlands. Hakluyt's handwritten manuscript, MS Petyt 529, in Inner Temple Library in London was eventually published as The Free Sea for the first time in 2004.

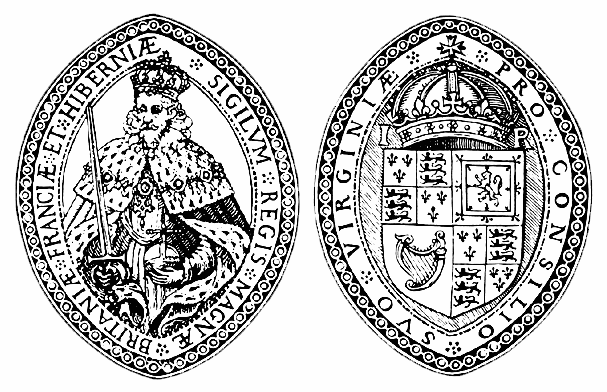
The seal of the Virginia Company of London

In 1591, Hakluyt inherited family property upon the death of his elder brother Thomas; a year later, upon the death of his youngest brother Edmund, he inherited additional property which derived from his uncle. In 1612 Hakluyt became a charter member of the North-west Passage Company. By the time of his death, he had amassed a small fortune out of his various emoluments and preferments, of which the last was the clergy house of Gedney, Lincolnshire, presented to him by his younger brother Oliver in 1612. Unfortunately, his wealth was squandered by his only son.

Hakluyt died on 23 November 1616, probably in London, and was buried on 26 November in Westminster Abbey; by an error in the abbey register his burial is recorded under the year 1626. A number of his manuscripts, sufficient to form a fourth volume of his collections of 1598–1600, fell into the hands of Samuel Purchas, who inserted them in an abridged form in his Pilgrimes (1625–1626). Others, consisting chiefly of notes gathered from contemporary authors, are preserved at the University of Oxford.

Hakluyt is principally remembered for his efforts in promoting and supporting the settlement of North America by the English through his writings. These works were a fertile source of material for William Shakespeare and other authors. Hakluyt also encouraged the production of geographical and historical writings by others. It was at Hakluyt's suggestion that Robert Parke translated Juan González de Mendoza's The History of the Great and Mighty Kingdom of China and the Situation Thereof (1588–1590), John Pory made his version of Leo Africanus's A Geographical Historie of Africa (1600), and P. Erondelle translated Marc Lescarbot's Nova Francia (1609).

== Legacy ==
The Hakluyt Society was founded in 1846 for printing rare and unpublished accounts of voyages and travels, and continues to publish volumes each year.

In 1936 Cunard White Star Line commissioned the marine artist Kenneth Shoesmith to paint a hexagonal oil-on-canvas depiction of Hakluyt, Richard Hakluyt Recording the Voyages of the Elizabethan Sailors, for the liner RMS Queen Mary. The painting remains aboard the ship, now moored at Long Beach, California, and has been identified for conservation treatment by the Queen Mary Heritage Foundation.

As of 2018, a 14-volume critical edition of Hakluyt's Principal Navigations was being prepared by the Hakluyt Edition Project for Oxford University Press under the general editorship of Daniel Carey, National University of Ireland, Galway, and Claire Jowitt, University of East Anglia.

Westminster School named a house after him as recognition of achievement of an Old Westminster.

In Svalbard (Spitsbergen), the Hakluythovden headland and Hakluytodden landspit in the northwestern region of Amsterdam Island are named after Richard Hakluyt.

== Works ==
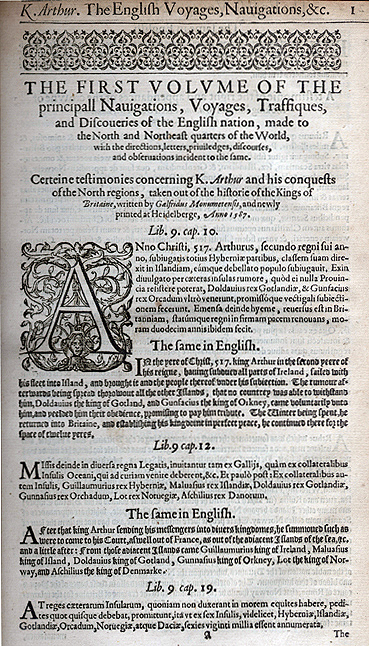
The first page of Vol. I of the 2nd edition of Hakluyt's The Principall Nauigations, Voyages, Traffiques, and Discoueries of the English Nation (1598)

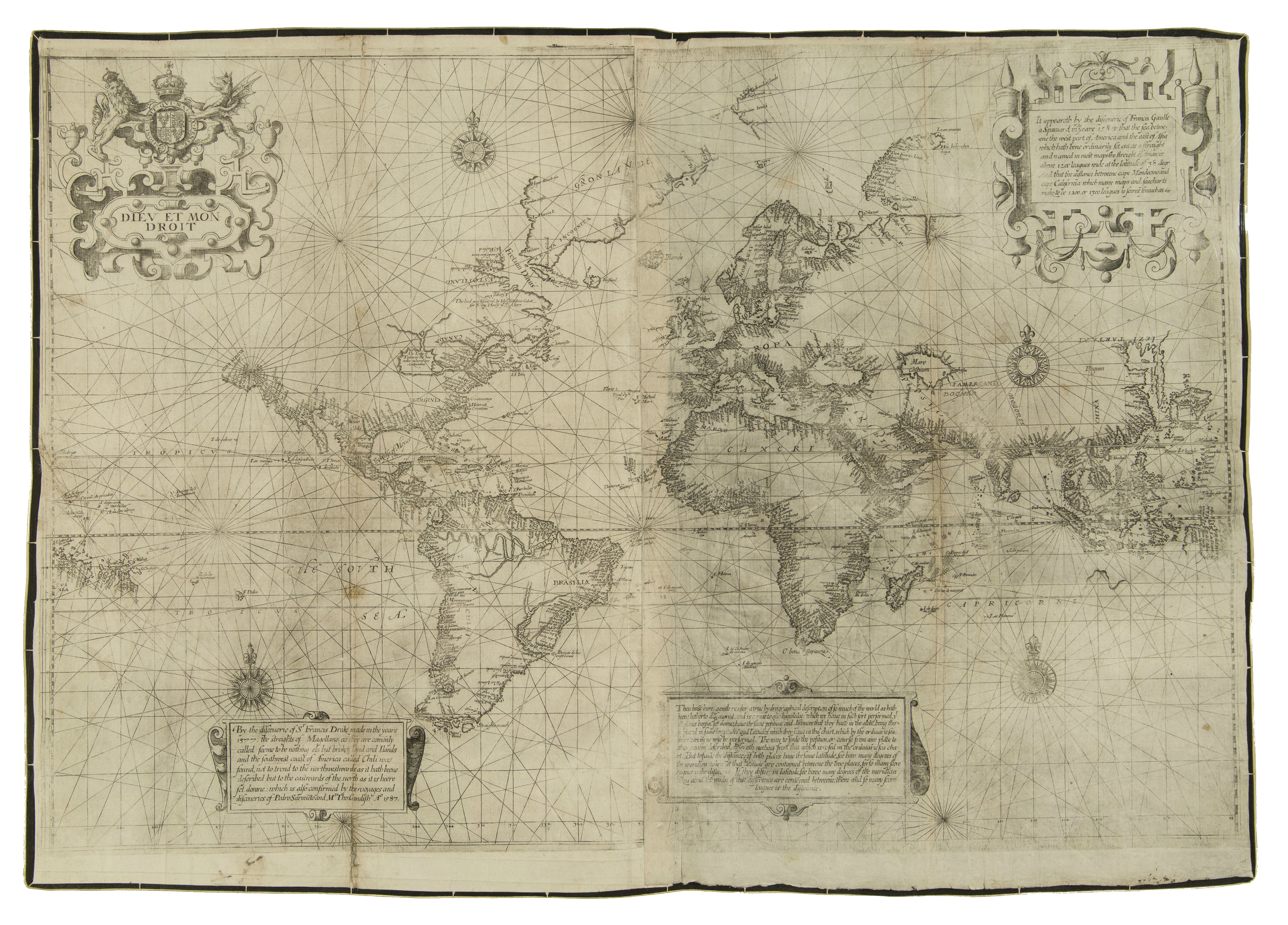
The Wright–Molyneux map of the world selected by Hakluyt for inclusion in the 2nd edition of The Principall Nauigations...

=== Authored ===
- Hakluyt, Richard (1582). Divers Voyages Touching the Discoverie of America and the Ilands Adjacent unto the Same, Made First of All by Our Englishmen and Afterwards by the Frenchmen and Britons: With Two Mappes Annexed Hereunto. London: [Thomas Dawson] for T. Woodcocke. Quarto. Reprint:
  - Hakluyt, Richard (1850). John Winter Jones (ed.). Divers Voyages Touching the Discovery of America and the Islands Adjacent [Hakluyt Society; 1st Ser., no. 7]. London: Hakluyt Society. p. 1.
- Hakluyt, Richard (1584). A Particuler Discourse Concerninge the Greate Necessitie and Manifolde Commodyties That Are Like to Growe to This Realme of Englande by the Westerne Discoueries Lately Attempted, Written in the Yere 1584. [London?]: [s.n.] Reprints:
  - Hakluyt, Richard (1877). Charles Deane (ed.). A Discourse Concerning Western Planting, Written in the Year 1584. Collections of the Maine Historical Society, Second Series; II. Cambridge, Mass.: Press of John Wilson and Son [for the Maine Historical Society]. OCLC 4618335.
  - Hakluyt, Richard (1993). David B. Quinn; Alison M. Quinn (eds.). A Particuler Discourse Concerninge the Greate Necessitie and Manifolde Commodyties that are Like to Growe to this Realme of Englande by the Westerne Discoueries Lately Attempted. Extra. London: Hakluyt Society. ISBN 978-0-904180-35-0.
- Hakluyt, Richard (1589). The Principall Navigations, Voiages, and Discoveries of the English Nation: Made by Sea or Over Land to the Most Remote and Farthest Distant Quarters of the Earth at Any Time within the Compasse of These 1500 Years: Divided into Three Several Parts According to the Positions of the Regions Whereunto They Were Directed; the First Containing the Personall Travels of the English unto Indæa, Syria, Arabia ... the Second, Comprehending the Worthy Discoveries of the English Towards the North and Northeast by Sea, as of Lapland ... the Third and Last, Including the English Valiant Attempts in Searching Almost all the Corners of the Vaste and New World of America ... Whereunto is Added the Last Most Renowned English Navigation Round About the Whole Globe of the Earth. London: Imprinted by George Bishop and Ralph Newberie, deputies to Christopher Barker, printer to the Queen's Most Excellent Majestie. Folio. Reprint:
  - Hakluyt, Richard (1965). The Principall Navigations Voiages and Discoveries of the English Nation ... Imprinted at London, 1589: A Photo-Lithographic Facsimile with an Introduction by David Beers Quinn and Raleigh Ashlin Skelton and with a New Index by Alison Quinn [Hakluyt Society; Extra Ser., nos. 39a & 39b]. Cambridge: Cambridge University Press for Hakluyt Society & Peabody Museum of Salem. 2 vols.
- Hakluyt, Richard (1598–1600). The Principall Nauigations, Voyages, Traffiques, and Discoueries of the English Nation, Made by Sea or Overland ... at Any Time Within the Compasse of these 1500 [1600] Yeeres, &c. London: G. Bishop, R. Newberie & R. Barker. 3 vols.; folio. Reprints:
  - Hakluyt, Richard (1884–1890). E[dmund] Goldsmid (ed.). The Principal Navigations, Voyages, Traffiques and Discoveries of the English Nation. Edinburgh: E. & G. Goldsmid. 16 vols. Full-text of this edition available as follows: Volume 1; Volume 2 (Latin); Volume 3; Volume 4; Volume 5; Volume 6; Volume 7; Volume 8; Volume 9; Volume 10; Volume 11; Volume 12; Volume 13; Volume 14.
  - Hakluyt, Richard (1903–1905). The Principal Navigations Voyages Traffiques & Discoveries of the English Nation, etc. [Hakluyt Society; Extra Ser., nos. 1–12]. Glasgow: James MacLehose & Sons for the Hakluyt Society. 12 vols. Full-text of this edition available as follows: Volume 1; Volume 2; Volume 3; Volume 4; Volume 5; Volume 6; Volume 7; Volume 8; Volume 9; Volume 10; Volume 11; Volume 12.

=== Edited ===
- Anglerius, Petrus Martyr (1587). Richard Hakluyt (ed.). De Orbe Nouo Petri Martyris Anglerii Mediolanensis Protonotarii et Caroli Quinti Senatoris Decades Octo, Diligenti Temporum Observatione et Utilissinis Annotationibus Illustratæ ... Paris: G. Auvray. Octavo.
- Galvão, Antonio (1601). Richard Hakluyt (ed.). The Discoveries of the World from Their First Originall unto the Yeer ... 1555; Written in the Portugall Tongue by A. Galvano. London: G. Bishop. Quarto. Reprint:
  - Galvano, Antonio (1862). Vice-Admiral Bethune (Charles Ramsay Drinkwater Bethune) (ed.). The Discoveries of the World, from Their First Original unto the Year of our Lord, 1555. [Edited by F. de Sousa Tavares.] Corrected ... and published in England, by R. Hakluyt ... [Hakluyt Society; 1st Ser., no. 30]. London: Hakluyt Society.

=== Translated ===
- [Cartier, Jacques (1580). A Shorte and Briefe Narration of the Two Nauigations and Discoueries to the Northwest Partes called Newe Fraunce, first Translated out of French into Italian by... Gio. Bapt. Ramutius, and now Turned into English by John Florio, etc. London: H[enry] Bynneman dvvelling in Thames streate, neere vnto Baynardes Castell.] It seems likely that this work was not by Hakluyt: see "At the English Embassy in Paris" above.
- Laudonnière, René de (1587). A Notable Historie Containing Foure Voyages made by Certaine French Captaynes unto Florida, wherein the Great Riches and Fruitefulnes of the Countrey, with the Maners of the People, hitherto Concealed, are Brought to Light ... Newly Translated Out of French into English by R. H. ... Translated by Richard Hakluyt. London: Thomas Dawson. Quarto.
- de Soto, Ferdinando (1609). Virginia Richly Valued, by the Description of the Maine Land of Florida, Her Next Neighbour: Out of the Foure Yeeres Travell and Discoverie... of Don Ferdinando de Soto and Sixe Hundred Able Men in His Companie ... Written by a Portugall gentleman of Elvas, ... and Translated out of Portugese [sic] by Richard Hakluyt. Translated by Richard Hakluyt. London: F. Kyngston for M. Lownes. Quarto.
- Grotius, Hugo; William Welwod (2004). David Armitage (ed.). The Free Sea. Translated by Richard Hakluyt. Indianapolis, Ind.: Liberty Fund. ISBN 978-0-86597-431-9. Archived from the original on 18 June 2009.

== See also ==
- Étienne Bellenger
