= Rémi-Joseph Tellier =

French Jesuit priest (1796–1866)

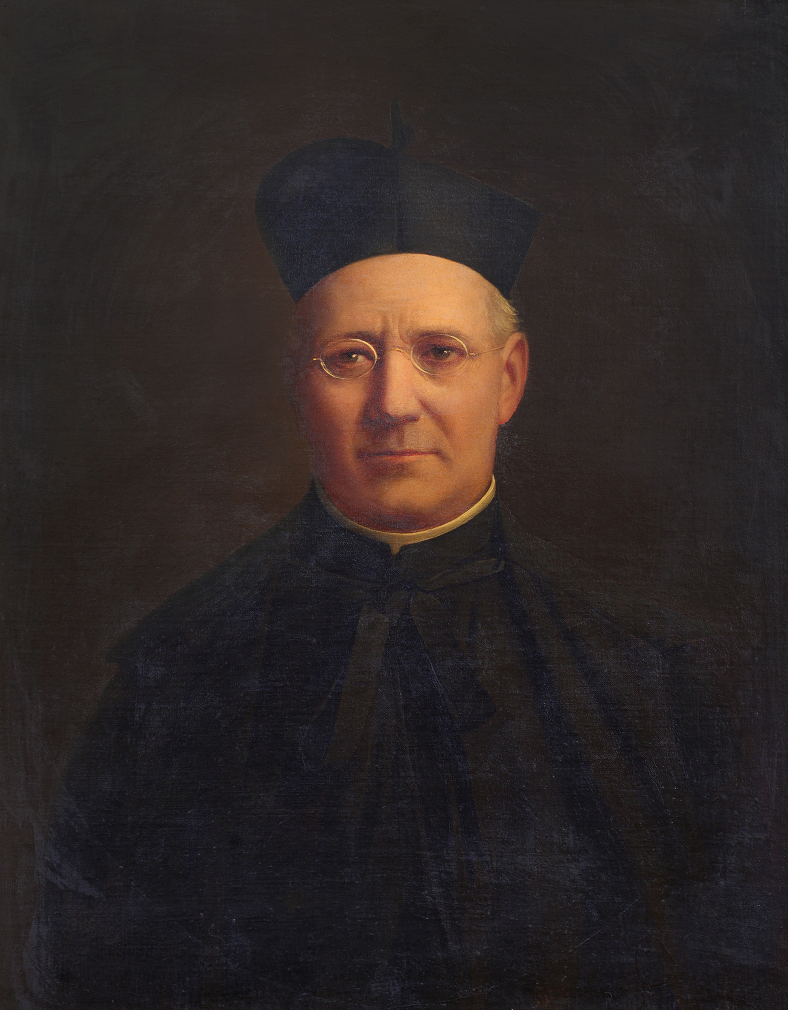
- Born: October 9, 1796; Tavaux, France
- Died: January 7, 1866 (aged 69); Collège Sainte-Marie in Canada
- Known for: Seventh President of Fordham University

Rémi-Joseph Tellier (1796-1866) was a French Jesuit priest. After postings in France and Italy, in 1842 Tellier emigrated to Canada with several other Jesuits determined to establish the order there. He remained in Canada for ten years before moving to the US, where he became the first prefect of Studies and Discipline at the College of St. Francis Xavier, New York, then rector of St John's College (now Fordham University), New York. Later in his life, Tellier returned to Canada. He died in Montreal.

== Early years ==
Rémi-Joseph Tellier was born on October 9, 1796, in Tavaux, France. He entered the Jesuit Order on October 11, 1818, and spent many years teaching at a variety of colleges. After his ordination in 1831, he held the position of rector of the Collège de Chambéry in Savoy from 1833 to 1837. He then held the same position at the Collège d’Aoste in Italy until 1840.

In 1842, he was one of nine Jesuits to try to reestablish the Jesuit order in Canada. Tellier was skeptical about the future success of the order in Canada, but still attempted to help. He volunteered to assist the Irish victims of typhus at Montreal Island in the fall of 1847. In 1849 he was sent to Bishop Rémi Gaulin of Kingston to act as director of Regiopolis College. From 1850 to 1852 he worked with Bishop de Charbonnel in Toronto, and attempted to create a college of the society there.

== St. John's College ==
Around 1853, Tellier became the first prefect of Studies and Discipline at the College of St. Francis Xavier in New York. Two years later, in 1855, he became the seventh rector at St John's College in Fordham.

Tellier was rector during the 1856 commencement when controversy over his presidency arose. The invited speaker at the college that year was Orestes Brownson, a philosopher and Catholic convert. Brownson often disagreed with the political views of John Hughes, the archbishop of New York and founder of St. John's. After Brownson's lecture, in which he discussed his ideas of the role the Catholic Church should play in American society, Hughes voiced his objections and humiliated Brownson.

Hughes continued to voice displeasure at the manner in which the Jesuits were overseeing the college. At one point, "the president of St. John's board of trustees, Mr. Peter Hargous, told the Jesuit president Remigius I. Tellier...that the best thing for the Jesuits to do was to give the archbishop a year's notice and then get out of town."

Growing tensions with Hughes, who owned the property rights to the Seminary of St. Joseph, led to the withdrawal of Jesuits from their service at St. Joseph's. Tellier needed to find accommodations for the Jesuit scholastics who left the seminary, and began an extensive remodeling of Rose Hill Manor.

In 1857 Hughes wrote a letter to Tellier expressing his dissatisfaction with the Jesuits: "I have understood that the Jesuits in my diocese have been making appeals to some of our lay-Catholics in the way of seeking redress or securing sympathy on account of real or imaginary grievances which your Society have had to suffer at my hands. This appeal to the laity is a new feature in our ecclesiastical discipline." Tellier acknowledged receiving the letter, and forwarded it to the regional superior. He wrote back to Hughes detailing his distress about the accusations, and claiming he did not know of any foundations for them. The problems with Hughes continued to be a worry for Tellier until the end of his presidency.

== Later years ==
In 1859, Tellier became the superior general of the New York–Canada mission. He spent the remainder of his life dedicated to building the Church of the Gesù, next to the Collège Sainte-Marie in Montreal; however, he was too sick to attend the opening celebrations of the church in December 1865.
