= Ô Canada! mon pays, mes amours =

French-Canadian patriotic song

Song
- Language: French
- English title: O Canada! my country, my love
- Written: 1834
- Published: June 29, 1835
- Genre: Patriotic song
- Composer: Jean-Baptiste Labelle
- Lyricist: George-Étienne Cartier

"Ô Canada! mon pays, mes amours", meaning "O Canada! my country, my love" is a French-Canadian patriotic song. It was written by George-Étienne Cartier and first sung in 1834, during a patriotic banquet of the Saint-Jean-Baptiste Society held in Montreal. The words were first published in the June 29, 1835 edition of La Minerve. It was later published in Le Chansonnier des collèges (Quebec 1850), this time with music, but with only four of the original six verses. It was reproduced in Le Passe-Temps on June 21, 1913. The song was recorded on 78 rpm discs by both Victor Occellier and Joseph Saucier around the turn of the century and in 1925 or 1926 by Rodolphe Plamondon Roger Doucet included it in his LP Chants glorieux (Songs of Glory) in 1976.

The music currently used was composed by Jean-Baptiste Labelle. It is uncertain when the lyrics and music were put together, probably by Ernest Gagnon sometime between 1850 and 1868.

== Excerpt ==
Comme le dit un vieil adage :
Rien n'est si beau que son pays;
Et de le chanter, c'est l'usage;
Le mien je chante à mes amis
L'étranger voit avec un œil d'envie
Du Saint-Laurent le majestueux cours;
À son aspect le Canadien s'écrie :
Ô Canada! mon pays! mes amours!

== English translation ==
As the old proverb says:
Nothing is more beautiful than one's country;
And to sing it is the tradition;
And mine I sing to my friends
The stranger looks with an envious eye
Of the St. Lawrence the majestic course;
At its aspect the Canadian sings:
O Canada! my country! my love!

== See also ==
- Canadian patriotic music
- Music of Quebec
