= François Boucher (violinist) =

Canadian violinist and music educator

François Boucher (1860 – c. 1936) was a Canadian violinist and music educator.

Born in Montreal, Boucher was the son of Canadian publisher and musician Adélard Joseph Boucher and the brother of conductor Joseph-Arthur Boucher. His initial violin studies were with Jules Hone and Frantz Jehin-Prume. In 1876 he went to Europe to study at the Royal Conservatory of Liège with Lambert Massart. After returning to Canada, he had a triumphant success in Montreal performing Felix Mendelssohn's Violin Concerto in E minor, Op. 64 in 1881. In 1882 he and his father established a successful music store in Ottawa. That same year he began playing first violin in a string quartet and working as a teacher. In 1887 he joined the faculty of the Toronto Conservatory of Music. He taught concurrently at the Toronto College of Music beginning in 1889. He was a soloist with the Toronto Philharmonic Society in 1893 where he had success performing Max Bruch's Violin Concerto No. 1. In 1894 he emigrated to the United States. In 1906 he joined the faculty of the Kansas City Conservatory of Music, where he taught through 1923. His wife taught piano at the conservatory and his daughter was later a singing teacher at the school. He died in Kansas City.
