= Discourse Concerning Western Planting =

1584 document written by Richard Hakluyt

Discourse Concerning Western Planting was a document written by Richard Hakluyt in 1584.

This document was written to convince Queen Elizabeth I to support the colonization schemes of Walter Raleigh and to encourage English merchants and gentry to invest in those enterprises.

Richard Hakluyt presented the work privately to the queen in 1584. The private character of the memorial, which was not to be seen by the general eye, permitted Hakluyt to state freely the case for a colonial policy. Such freedom was necessary If the Discourse were to discuss with any adequacy the great political obstacle to colonizing, the fear of Spain; and to the case against Spain a good half of the Discourse was dedicated. Hakluyt was apparently well fortified with argument by his naval friends, who seem to have belonged to the aggressive school of Drake. He devoted several sections to the already familiar idea of a colony as a naval outpost. Given an American base, the argument ran, there was opened an easy channel to the West Indies, a channel for attack on the forts on land or for a swoop on the fleet carrying home American treasure. There was opened also a channel for a descent on the Spaniards who haunted the northern fishing banks and who supplied Spain with some of its food. With the resource of a colony England could strike at will at the root of Spanish power, which lay overseas.

== Points of the "Discourse" ==
The document contains 21 points making the case for colonization of North America:

1. Colonization enlarges the reformed church, of which Queen Elizabeth is the head.
2. New world ports will relieve the hardships faced trading near Catholic Lands.
3. North America contains all the commodities England needs.
4. Colonies can employ idle men and working families will grow the population.
5. American ports will enable English ships to interdict Spanish ships coming from the Caribbean.
6. Spanish Gold has ruled Europe for too long, England needs to find its own gold.
7. Spanish Control is weak in the west indies.
8. North of 23 degrees there are no Spanish settlements to impede English expansion.
9. Spanish southern coastline is rich with minerals, maybe the northern coastline will be too.
10. If England breached Spanish lines in the West Indies they have nothing else in the Western Hemisphere.
11. Spanish cruelties in West Indies are worse than Turks.
12. Ireland is a perfect port for sailing to the west, ships from SW Ireland will not interfere with other nations trade.
13. The Queen can increase customs revenue from more trade.
14. Increase English Navy by increasing seamanship and need for sailors.
15. England must speedily make long term settlement(planting) before others do.
16. Opportunities in America will bring more enterprising people to leadership for England.
17. England could find the Northwest Passage to China.
18. England has a lawful claim to the North American coast which needs to be exercised.
19. As England gains land in western hemisphere it will force Spain to give up on the old Papal bull of land control.
20. Point 20 lists 23 reasons how settling will be profitable.
21. Point 21 lists the many commodities and resources which can be found in America.
