= Étienne Bellenger =

Étienne Bellenger (fl. 1580–84) was a merchant from Rouen, France who, through his trading expeditions, became an important figure in the early exploration of the Maritimes in Canada.

Bellenger appears to have been a general merchant who took sea expeditions for trading purposes. Trips to the Atlantic coast would have obtained fish and furs. Charles, Cardinal de Bourbon, the archbishop of Rouen, became aware of Bellenger's previous travels and sponsored a trip to explore and trade along the coast of Nova Scotia. He was also to establish a small post that would be left manned while the ship returned to France. In early 1583, the ship left for the New World and Bellenger explored and traded extensively, keeping a record of his findings.

It is certain that Bellenger's records of his journey quickly became available in Europe, as the English writer, Richard Hakluyt, soon made contact with him. The information of the trip was readily shared with Hakluyt who recorded it in detail.

Because of the involvement of Hakluyt, knowledge of this part of the Americas was widely circulated, thus making Bellenger's contribution to exploration in Nova Scotia even more important.
