= Jean-Joseph Casot =

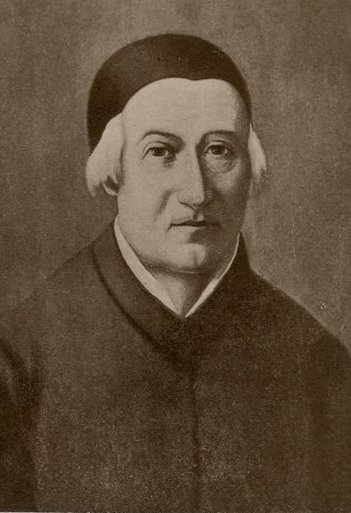
- Born: 4 October 1728; Paliseul, Belgium
- Died: 16 March 1800 (aged 71); Quebec City, Lower Canada

Jean-Joseph Casot (October 4, 1728 – March 16, 1800) was a Jesuit came from France to Canada in 1757 as a lay brother.

Upon his arrival in Canada, the Jesuits assign tasks to Jean-Joseph Casot in Batiscanie. One of his first papers he wrote in Canada, contains for the first time the mention of "Rivière des Envies" (Carvings river) which pours in Batiscan river in St. Stanislas. Casot served Jesuits in various capacities, including as treasurer of the Jesuit college in Quebec, until his ordination as a priest by Bishop Jean-Olivier Briand in 1766. He devoted the rest of his life as the steward of the college in Quebec. He also acted confessor with nuns of the Hôtel-Dieu de Québec for a number of years.

Casot is known as the last Jesuit in Canada. Before his death and in his will, he tried to settle the fate of the many properties that were part of the assets of the Jesuits in the country. Despite these efforts, his death began a long period of disputes over the Jesuit estates. The Society of Jesus was re-established in Canada in 1842 by Clément Boulanger.
