= Michel Bibaud =

Canadian writer and educator

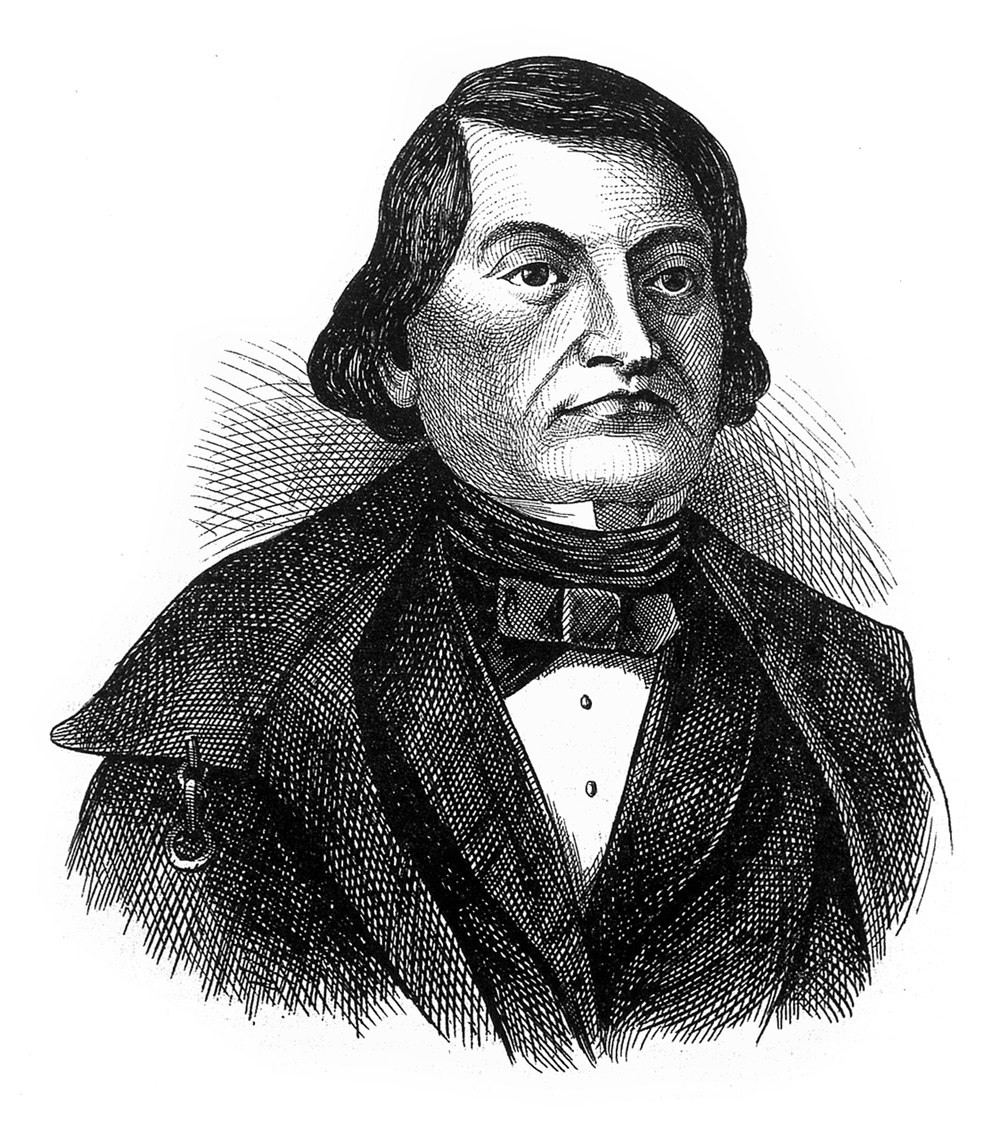
- Born: 19 January 1782; Montreal, Quebec
- Died: 3 August 1857 (aged 75); Montreal, Canada East
- Occupations: writer and educator
- Known for: founder and editor of La Bibliothèque canadienne

Michel Bibaud (19 January 1782 – 3 August 1857) was a Canadian writer and educator in Montreal, Quebec.

In 1813 Bibaud began working as a journalist for Le Spectateur in Montreal. Later he became the founder and editor of La Bibliothèque canadienne with the close assistance of Joseph-Marie Bellenger. His body of work was diverse and large. The historical content has importance to the events of the time.

Bibaud is credited with the first book written in verse by a Canadian. It was entitled Épîtres, Satires, Chansons, Épigrammes et Autres Pièces de vers and was published in 1830. His son, François-Maximilien, became a widely published writer on diverse topics concerning law and judicial matters.
