= Collège Sainte-Marie de Montréal =

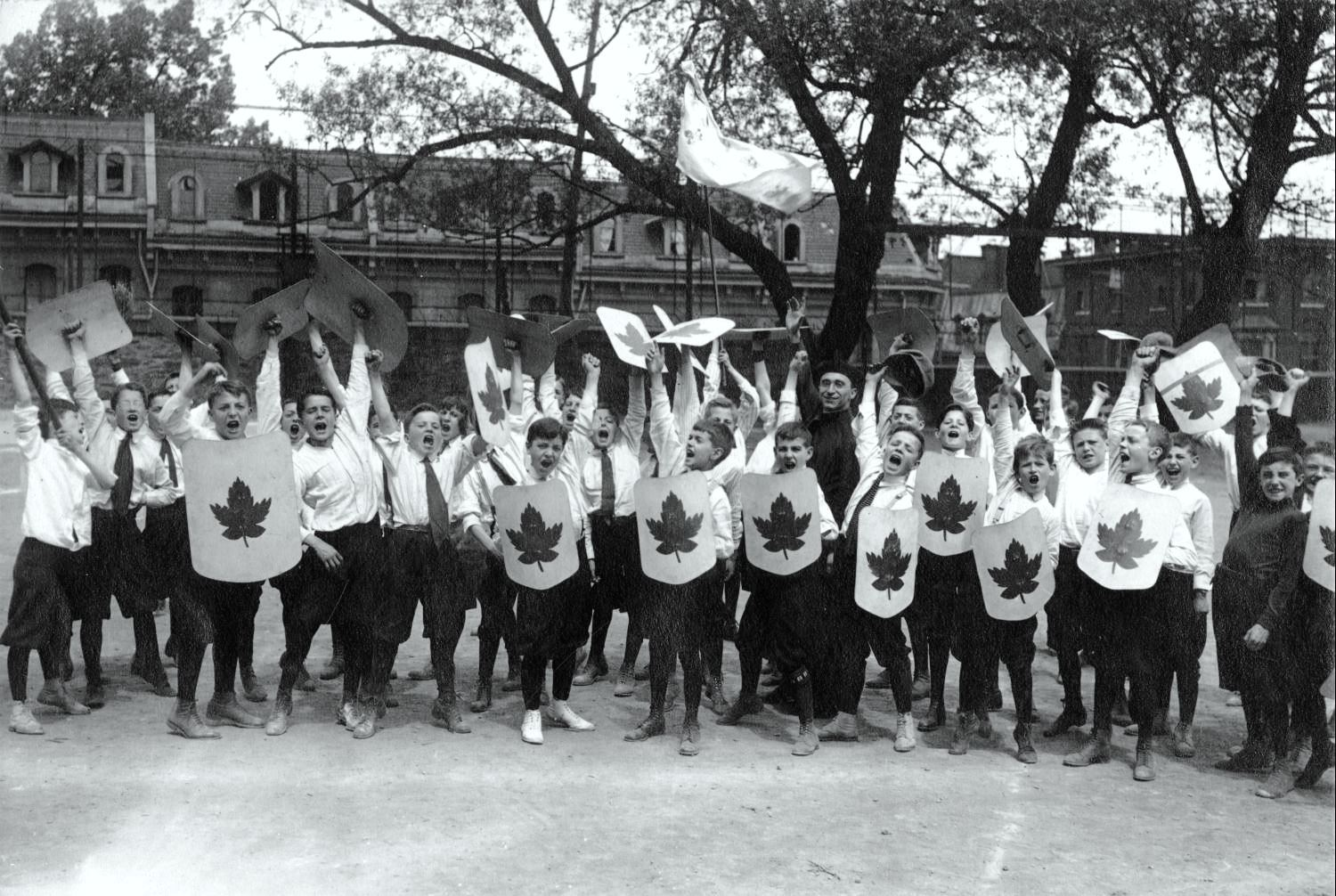
- Primary students at Collège Ste-Marie in 1919
- Active: 1848–1969
- Affiliations: Jesuit
- Location: Montreal, Quebec, Canada; 45.5053°N 73.5663°W

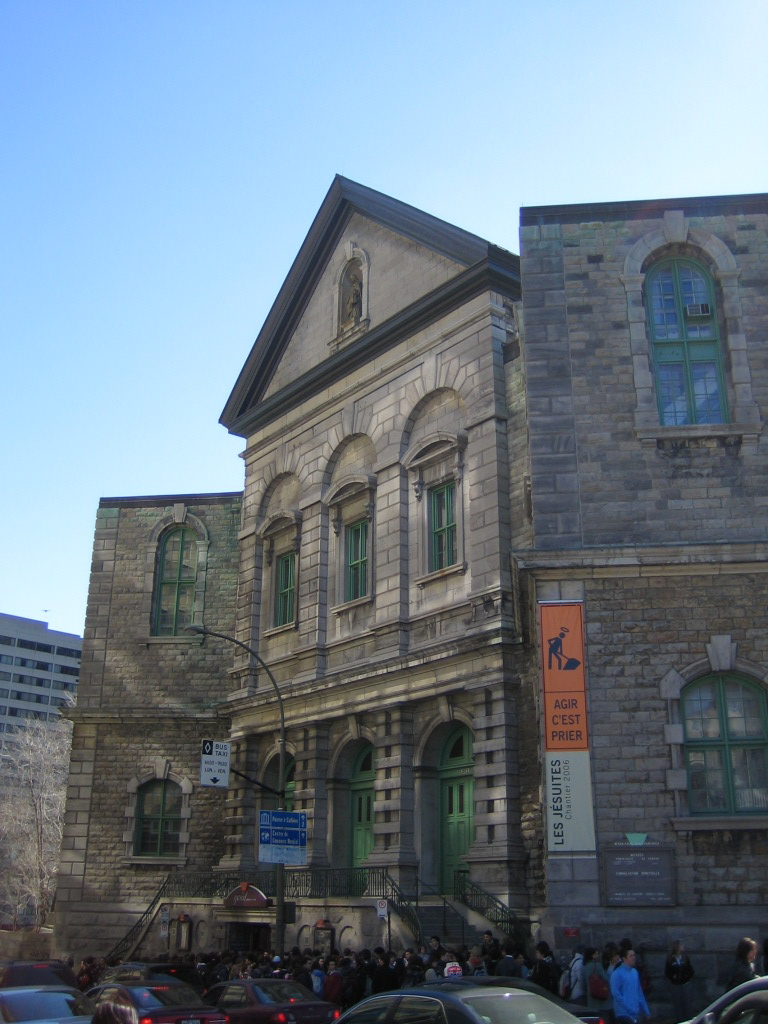
Gesu Theatre.

Collège Sainte-Marie (French pronunciation: [kɔlɛʒ sɛ̃t maʁi]) was a college in Montreal, Quebec, Canada. It ceased to exist in 1969, when it was merged into UQAM (Université du Québec à Montréal).

== History ==
Collège Ste-Marie was founded by Jesuits in 1848. It had an English sector, which called the school St. Mary's College but later became separate in 1896 as Loyola College. Ste-Marie never issued degrees. It relied on its affiliation with chartered universities to grant degrees but had full curriculum control. Ste-Marie was originally affiliated with Université Laval until 1920, when it was affiliated with Université de Montréal. The college originally offered secondary education as well as collegial studies.

== Church ==
A portion of the original college remains as the Église du Gesù (Church of Gesu, named after the church where St. Ignatius of Loyola is buried), which was originally the college chapel. Built in 1865 and designed by Irish architect Patrick Keely, it is one of the oldest religious buildings in Montreal. Also housed in the structure is the Salles du Gesù, Montreal's oldest theatre.

== Notable alumni ==
- Leo Dandurand
- Marcel Dubé
- Louis-Philippe de Grandpré, former puisne justice of the Supreme Court of Canada
- Arthur Farrell
- Yves Fortier (lawyer)
- André Laurendeau
- Georges-Raoul-Léotale-Guichart-Humbert Saveuse de Beaujeu
- Léon-Mercier Gouin
- Lucien L'Allier
- Michael J. McGivney
- Jean Prévost
- Joseph Royal
- Paul Sauvé
- Guy Sylvestre, Jean-Guy Sylvestre, former head of the National Library of Canada
- Charles-Émile Trudeau
- Arthur Turcotte

== Notable faculty ==
- François-Maximilien Bibaud
- Adélard Joseph Boucher
- Joseph-A. Fowler
- Jean-Baptiste Labelle

== See also ==
- List of Jesuit sites
