= Clément Boulanger (Jesuit) =

Clément Boulanger (30 October 1790 – 12 June 1868) was a Jesuit priest who was notable in Canadian history.

Boulanger was a young priest when the Society of Jesus was re-established in France. He joined the Jesuits in 1823 and by 1842 he was made provincial of the Jesuits in France. In that same year he oversaw the reconstitution of the Jesuits in Canada, the last Jesuit priest there, Jean-Joseph Casot, having died in 1800. Nine Jesuits were sent to Montreal, arriving on 31 May 1842 and marked a new beginning for the Society of Jesus in Canada.
