= Henri-Antoine Mézière =

Canadian journalist, and radical activist 1771-1846

- Born: December 6, 1771; Montreal, Quebec
- Died: January 4, 1846 (aged 74); Bordeaux, France
- Occupation: Journalist
- Writing career
- Period: 19th century
- Genres: History, fiction

Henri-Antoine Mézière (December 6, 1771 – January 4, 1846) was a political agent, civil servant, publisher and Quebec journalist.

== Biography ==
Mézière was born in Montreal, Quebec. His father, Pierre-François Mézière came from Dijon where he was a lawyer and notary. He emigrated to French Canada towards the end of the French Regime. His mother was Michel Archangel Campeau. He had 14 brothers and sisters, 6 of whom died before reaching adulthood.

From 1782 to 1788, he studied at St. Raphael College in Montreal. By his own account, Mézière wrote, "a college entrusted to ignorant clerics was the tomb of my youthful years." In January 1788, he published his first poetry in The Montreal Gazette, a journal founded by Fleury Mesplet.

In 1791, Resplet published an account of a meeting of young men who celebrated the Constitutional Act 1791 with revolutionary toasts. In the following year, Mézière felt that the situation in Montreal was untenable for him and in May 1793 he left for the United States. After passing through New York, he reached Philadelphia and got in touch with Edmond-Charles Genet, ambassador of the French First Republic. Since it declared war on Great Britain on February 1, France sought to foment rebellion amongst the population of Upper Canada and Lower Canada against the British colonial government.

In June, Mézière submitted a text entitled "Comment on the current state of Canada and on the political dispositions of its inhabitants", in which it stated that British troops are spread thin across a 200-mile frontier but that for the Canadian population to rise up against the British authorities they would need the help of France. The embassy then instructed him to open a reliable correspondence with Canada from the United States and to distribute "patriotic papers, songs, convention ballots and an address prepared by the Embassy and entitled "French free to their brothers the Canadians". He was paid 1200 livres and instructed to return to Montreal with assorted pamphlets and propaganda material. He travelled to Lake Champlain where he enlisted the help of an agent, Jacques Rous, who went to Montreal in September 1793 but received little support even from his Meziere's radical friends. Rous may have been a double agent because the colonial authorities became aware of Mézière's presence. Rous reported back that Quebec was ripe for capture and that there were no naval assets to protect Lower Canada.

After accomplishing this mission, he was designated a "political agent" and took part in a military operation against Halifax. L'Eole, a French ship under the command of Rear-Admiral Sercey, was unable to accomplish its mission, which was abandoned. The ship, with Mézière still on board, finally crossed the Atlantic and docked at Brest on November 2, 1793.

On January 4, 1794, he submitted a memoir on the situation of Canada and the United States to Jean Dalbarade, then Minister of the Navy. He was imprisoned briefly due to mistaken identity after which he found a job as a civil servant in the city of Bordeaux.

He left France for New York following the Restoration of 1816. He survived by teaching French and with the help of his sisters and his friend Louis-Charles Foucher, he returned to Montreal on September 3. He signed a declaration of repentance for his collaboration with France and swore fidelity to the British crown before justice of the peace Jean-Marie Mondelet.

In February 1817, he became co-owner of the newspaper Le Spectateur canadien with Charles-Bernard Pasteuret. Mézière left the newspaper following a disagreement with his partner.

On August 1, 1818, he began to publish a bi-monthly newspaper, L'Abeille canadienne (The Canadian Bee), which mainly covered the content of French periodicals, among others La Ruche d'Aquitaine. Meziere wrote only a few articles as well as the prospectus. The paper lasted only six months until January 15, 1819. Mézière returned to France after his wife inherited land and income and he did not return to America. He died in 1846, in Bordeaux, France.

== Publications ==
- L'Abeille canadienne (The Canadian Bee), 1818–1819, 12 issues.
