= Le Fantasque (newspaper) =

- Founder: Napoléon Aubin
- Founded: 1837
- Ceased publication: 1845
- Political alignment: Classical liberalism

Le Fantasque was a liberal newspaper created in 1837 in Quebec, Canada, by Napoléon Aubin. It was published until 1845. Its style was humorous and used literary irony against censorship.

== See also ==
- List of newspapers in Canada
