= Joseph-Marie Bellenger =

Catholic priest and missionary in Canada (1788–1856)

Joseph-Marie Bellenger (15 April 1788 – 6 May 1856) was a Catholic priest and missionary in Canada. In addition, he was active in journalism for a period.

Bellenger was notable, in part, for his work in journalism. One important period was from 1825 to 1830 when, along with Michel Bibaud, he was active with La Bibliothèque canadienne. He also wrote for and edited the Mélanges religieux for a short period.
