= Mechanics' Hall (Toronto) =

Concert hall

Coordinates: 43.65117°N 79.3749°W

Mechanics' Hall was a concert hall on the ground floor of the Mechanics' Institutes building in Toronto, Ontario, Canada. The hall was used for theatrical productions, music concerts, public meetings, and lectures from 1856 to 1883.

Located on the east side of the downtown area at Church and Adelaide streets, the building was designed by Cumberland and Stone. The hall was designed with raised semi-circular seating and sat 500 people. Its construction was finished in 1856 but was later altered in 1861. During the 1860s the hall was the home of the Musical Union, a Toronto-based choral society. In 1874 the Toronto Philharmonic Society made their debut at the hall under conductor F.H. Torrington. In 1883 the Mechanics' Institutes building was sold to the city of Toronto. The city turned the building into Toronto's first public library and the hall was converted into storage space. In 1930 the building was demolished.
