= François-Maximilien Bibaud =

Canadian lawyer (1823–1887)

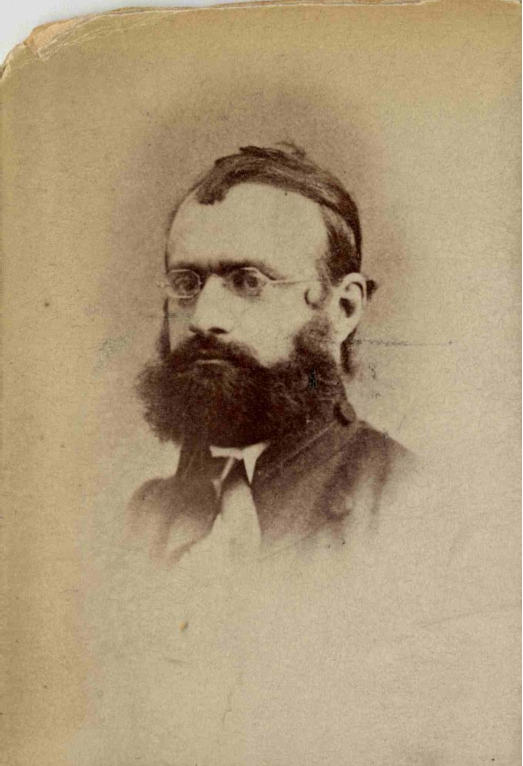

François-Maximilien Bibaud (23 October 1823 – 9 July 1887) was a Canadian lawyer, professor of law, polygraph, and chronicler. Son of Michel Bibaud, has an important place in Canadian history because of his teaching of law and extensive writing on a variety of juridical subjects. He was born in Montreal, Quebec.
