= Napoléon Aubin =

Swiss journalist, publisher, playwright and scientist

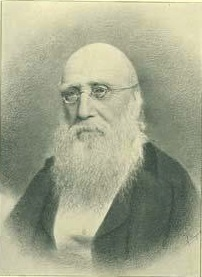
A portrait of Napoléon Aubin from the archives of the city of Montreal

Napoléon Aubin (9 November 1812 – 12 June 1890), christened Aimé-Nicolas, was born from a Swiss family in Chêne-Bougeries, a district of Geneva, at the time a territory of France. He was a journalist, writer, publisher, scientist, musician and lithographer.

== Biography ==
Little is known about the youth of Napoléon Aubin. He left school when he was about 16. The son of Pierre Louis Charles Aubin and Elisabeth Escuyer, he emigrated to New York in 1829 where he was to be a pastor in Biddeford, Maine. In 1835 he moved to Montreal, and then again to Quebec City, later that year. Aubin served as editor for numerous newspapers and magazines, including Le Canadien, L'Ami du peuple, de l'ordre et des lois (Law and Order), and La Tribune. In 1865, he launched the paper Les veillées du père Bonsens. A satirist, he wrote works in support of the Patriote movement, publishing his stories in Le Fantasque, a magazine he himself founded. He spent 53 days in prison for publishing a poem by Joseph-Guillaume Barthe, Aux exilés politiques canadiens. Aubin considered himself a liberal and a democrat, and in line with Étienne Parent, chose not participate in the Rebellion of 1837. In 1847, he published Manifeste adressé au peuple du Canada par le Comité constitutionnel de la réforme et du progrès (A Manifesto Addressed to the People of Canada by the Constitutional Committee for Reform and Progress), where he supported the ideas of Louis-Joseph Papineau. Notably, while on a trip to the U.S. he met Ulysses S. Grant, where they discussed the possibility of a union between Canada and the United States.

Aubin was married to Marie Luce Emilie in 1841, and had a son, Eugénie Aubin, who was born in 1853. In 1866, Aubin returned to Montreal in 1866, where he became a member of the Canadian Institute of Montreal in 1869. From 1875 until his death in 1890, he served as Honorary Consul to Switzerland in Montreal. A Calvinist by faith, his funeral was conducted by a Presbyterian minister.
