= Canadian military bands =

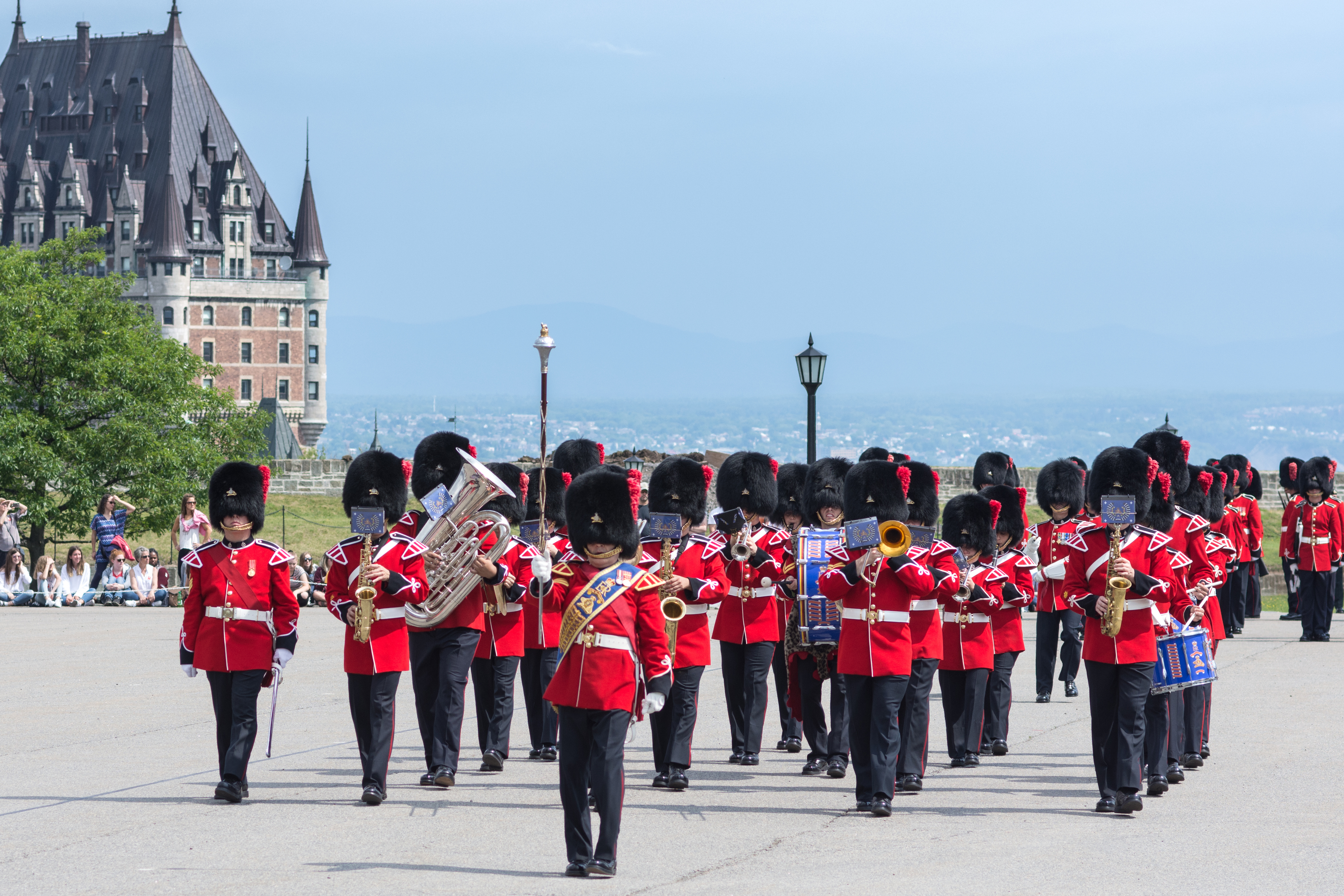
Musique du Royal 22^{e} Régiment is one of six full-time professional military bands with the Canadian Armed Forces.

Military bands of the Canadian Armed Forces (CAF) are organised within its Music Branch, and is composed of six full-time professional Regular Force bands, 15 Regular Force voluntary bands, and 53 part-time Primary Reserve bands. Bands of the Music Branch are often badged with the unit or Canadian Forces base insignia that they support.

Regular Force musicians are selected nationally by competitive audition prior to enlisting. Members of these bands often come from prestigious conservatories and schools of music. Reserve force musicians are hired and trained at the discretion of the local unit to which they apply. Prior to 1994, the Canadian Forces School of Music trained all recruits, regardless of musical level, to performance standard with Regular Force bands, but this practice was halted due to defense budget cuts.

== History ==
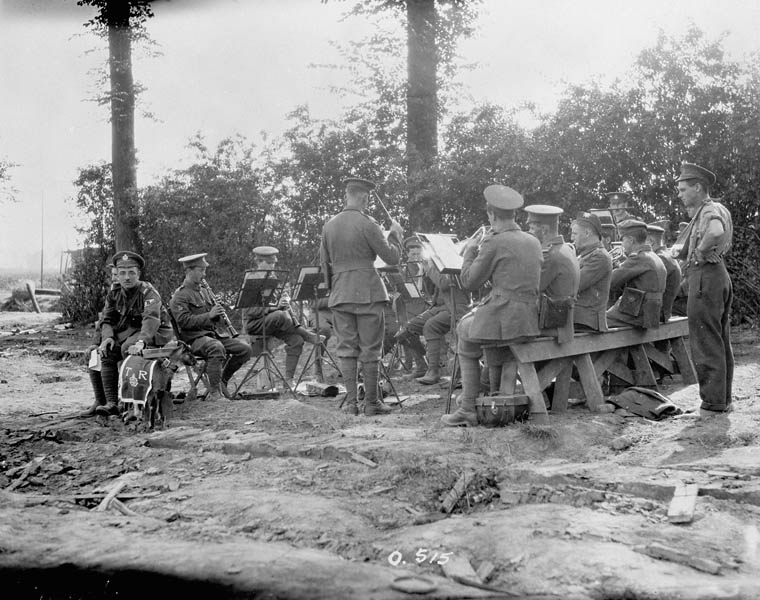
The Band of the 3rd Canadian Infantry Battalion.

The earliest known activity of a Canadian military band performing during the Trooping of the Colour at the Champ de Mars in Montreal on 18 July 1867, over two weeks after the Confederation of Canada. The first full-time Canadian military band was formed in 1899 with the Royal Canadian Garrison Artillery in Quebec with Joseph Vézina as its bandmaster. In 1909, an order by Minister of Militia and Defence, Frederick William Borden, provided the basis that Canadian bands were to never be unionized, during which a violation of this would result in the prolonging of outside engagements with the American Federation of Musicians. Bands were spread across the country for most of the early to mid-20th century, with units such as the Canadian Military Engineers and the Canadian Guards maintaining regimental bands. The band of the latter unit was the basis for the establishment of the Band of the Ceremonial Guard in the modern Canadian Forces.

During the Second World War, the RCAF Overseas Headquarters Band became the first Canadian military band to be based outside the country on a permanent basis. In 1941, Captain Frank Coleman became the first Inspector of Bands for Canada, during which he standardized the musical requirements for members in Canadian bands. Captain Robert Farnon led the overseas-based Canadian Band of the Allied Expeditionary Force as its conductor/arranger, being the equivalent of the American Band of the AEF led by Major Glenn Miller. Alfred Edward Zealley, a Naval officer who was considered to be the "Father of the Royal Canadian Navy bands", became director of music of the RCN in 1939 after her created a permanent music band at no cost to the Naval Service of Canada. Over the course of 4 years, he organized 19 navy bands for active service and oversaw the RCN School of Music in Toronto.

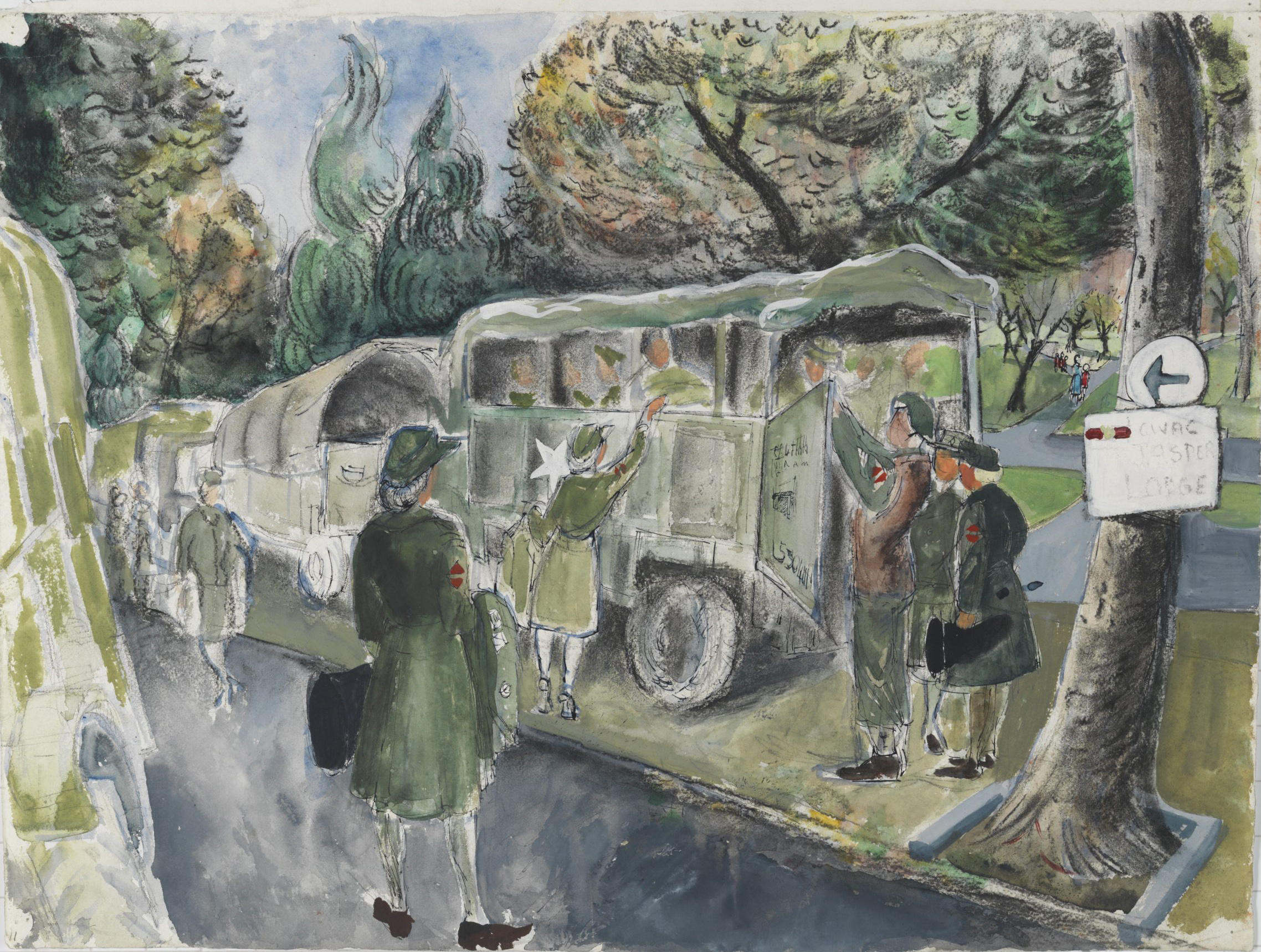
The Canadian Women's Army Corps Brass Band leaving for a concert in Apeldoorn, 1945.

During the Korean War there was a large expansion of the army, and the size and number of bands increased. In 1954, a school of music was established in Esquimalt, originally for musicians of the Royal Canadian Navy (RCN), but now for all Canadian Forces musicians to receive training, being the Canadian equivalent of the United States Armed Forces School of Music and the Royal Military School of Music. The largest gathering of Canadian military bands took place in 1967 during the Canadian Armed Forces Tattoo 1967 for the Canadian centenary. In 1974, Lynn Hong became the first woman to join a military band in Canada. Until the early 21st century the Music Branch also had drum and bugle corps and corps of drums within all branches of the CAF (the former formation is now only present in a few bands of the reserve formations). In 1994, the federal budget of Prime Minister Jean Chrétien resulted in the disbanding of five of the nine regular force bands. In June 1997, Art Eggleton, Minister of National Defence announced a restructuring of the Music Branch to included the creation of a new band in Victoria and another one in Edmonton, acting a full-time regular force naval band in the West.

=== Pipes and drums ===
Following the defeat of the Jacobite Army, which drew its main strength from Highland clans, in the Battle of Culloden in 1746, the British placed a ban on Highland influences such as bagpipes. As a result, many Scottish pipers immigrated to North America, often settling the bagpipe culture on the eastern coast in what is now Nova Scotia and New Brunswick. During the Seven Years' War and the American Revolution, the British government employed Scottish pipers. The great Highland bagpipe was a popular type of bagpipe used by Canadian pipe bands during the First World War. During this period, Canadian regiments often had pipe bands who played during battle alongside their units. The most notable among these bands was the Pipe Band of the 16th Battalion (Canadian Scottish), CEF, which was called in to escort the unit in the war.

By the time the Second World War ended, there was no full-time pipe band in the Canadian Army. When the Korean War broke out in 1950, a pipe band was authorized in the 27th Canadian Infantry Brigade known as the 1st Canadian Highland Battalion. It later became the Canadian Guards Pipe Band. In 1951, there were 24 reserve pipe bands. By 1965, there were 30 pipe bands divided into the following military commands and areas: 2 (Eastern Command), 1 (Quebec Command), 4 (Eastern Ontario Area), 8 (Central Ontario Area), 4 (Western Ontario Area), 2 (Manitoba Area), 3 (Saskatchewan Area), 3 (Alberta Area), 3 (British Columbia Area).

It was only in 1915 with the creation of the 110th Irish Regiment that an Irish-type pipe band was created following the example of the Scottish regiments of infantry, but this band was later disbanded.

=== Corps of drums ===
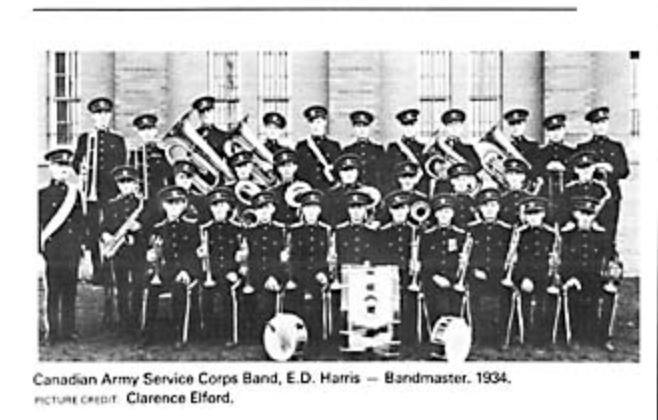
A Royal Canadian Army Service Corps Band in Calgary, 1934.

The earliest example of a Canadian corps of drums are found through the Fort Henry Guard and the Fort York Guard, historical group who both sport corps of drums that include fifes and are led by a drum major and a drum sergeant. During the Second World War, many regiments maintained small corps of drums that were stationed at all major bases. While most of them were staffed by active duty troops, others were volunteer corps of drums (and later drum and bugle corps) staffed by reservists and professional civilian percussionists. Corps of drums have been historically been based on the front-rank tradition of the Royal Marines Band Service. In the late 1940s, the Naval Band Service of the RCN and the HMCS Naden School of Music, alongside bands from several line infantry regiments of the Primary Reserve, continued this tradition. With the unification of the CAF in 1968, corps of drums in both the RCN and the regular army withered away as various bands were merged. While the navy recovered from this particularly in the mid-1980s within naval reserve bands, most of the army bands never recovered.

The sole corps of drums in service today within the Canadian Army is assigned to Princess Patricia's Canadian Light Infantry, and is modelled on the Corps of Drums of the British Army Royal Logistic Corps. Members are not professionally trained nor educated in music and are instead active soldiers who have chosen to participate in the corps. In July 2013, a five-sailor corps of drums in the Naden Band made a return to the public at the Victoria Day Parade.

=== Drum and bugle corps ===
The tradition of the drum and bugle corps of Canada's armed forces began in 1860 with the Second Battalion Volunteer Militia Rifles of Canada (later named The Queen's Own Rifles of Canada, a regiment of the Army Primary Reserve), which raised the first true military DBC in the country. Francis Clark was the bandmaster and bugle major of this pioneer formation. Charles Swift succeeded him when he died in 1876, and when the regimental bugle corps began touring US cities, it helped usher the era of military and civilian drum and bugle corps all over the world, not just in North America. Their influence was also a factor in the formation of the American and Canadian marching band culture, co-shared with the British tradition already in place. The traditions of the regimental bugle corps of The Queen's Own Rifles, in later decades of the 20th century, formed the basis of the Canadian military and civilian drum and bugle corps tradition.

The Queen's Own Rifles were not alone in forming the drum and bugle corps tradition in Canada. In the 1880s, they were followed by another, La Musique des Voltigeurs de Québec, of another Primary Reserve regiment, Quebec City's Les Voltigeurs de Québec. Their drum and bugle corps closely followed the traditions of the Queen's Own Rifles combined with the by now active fanfare band traditions of the French Army line and light infantry during the period in France. It too toured the country, most especially in French-speaking Quebec. Today, the historic traditions of these two regimental drum and bugle corps continue.

The drum and bugle corps of these two regiments spawned countless other bugle bands around Canada and the northern United States, both military and civil, and several of these corps are active today in Canada, either as affiliated ensembles, or as part of the Canadian Cadet Organizations.

=== Bands based on demographics ===
In the mid-1910s, a band was raised in the No. 2 Construction Company, which was the first all-black unit in the Canadian military. The band was created to perform at civic gatherings and in black churches. In 1917, it performed at the Dominion Day festivities, with a war diary noting that their performance "greatly assisted in entertaining the crowd and making the holiday a success." At the time of World War Two, various all-female bands were formed throughout the services. In the RCAF, the female band unit was the RCAF Women's Division Band (notably led by Maurice Dunmall from 1943 to 1944), while in the army the women's unit was known as the Canadian Women's Army Corps Pipe/Brass Band.

== Band characteristics ==
The Canadian Armed Forces mandate the existence of 2 distinct band types. Military bands are typically structured as brass and reed bands, or pipe and drum bands. These statuses, as defined in Queen's Regulations and Orders Chapter 32 and the Canadian Forces Band Instructions, requires that the bands follow all of the applicable Department of National Defence and Canadian Forces regulations concerning military bands and the provision of musical support. When two bands perform together, they are referred to as Combined Bands. When more than two bands are on parade, they are referred to as Massed Bands. Formerly, 2 more band types existed, corps of drums and drum and bugle corps.

Brass and reeds bands are performing ensembles consisting of several members of the woodwind instrument family, brass instrument family, and percussion instrument family.

Pipe and drum bands are performing ensembles consisting of bagpipes, and a drum corps composed of a bass drum, scottish tenor drums and snare drums.

Reserve corps of drums, active in a few regiments, are performing ensembles consisting of a percussion section made up of a bass drum, clash cymbals, tenor drums and snare drums (plus the optional glockenspiel/s) and a woodwind section of fifes and flutes. Bugles may also be carried by the woodwind section in keeping with British practice.

Reserve drum and bugle corps, active till the late 1990s, were generally similar to the others but consisted of percussion similar to the corps of drums with the addition of multiple tenor drums and bugles and variants of the brass instrument family (trumpets, cornets, soprano bugles, tenor valved bugles, alto bugles, mellophones, French horn bugles, marching baritones and contrabass bugles). Many drum and bugle corps of the Canadian Cadet Organizations follow the practice of these bands. These formations formerly were present in active Army and Navy formations.

Most brass and reed bands also form smaller ensembles to suit a variety of performance venues, including show bands, jazz ensembles, string quartets, rock bands, Celtic ensembles, brass quintets, woodwind quintets, parade bands, and Dixie bands.

== Performances ==
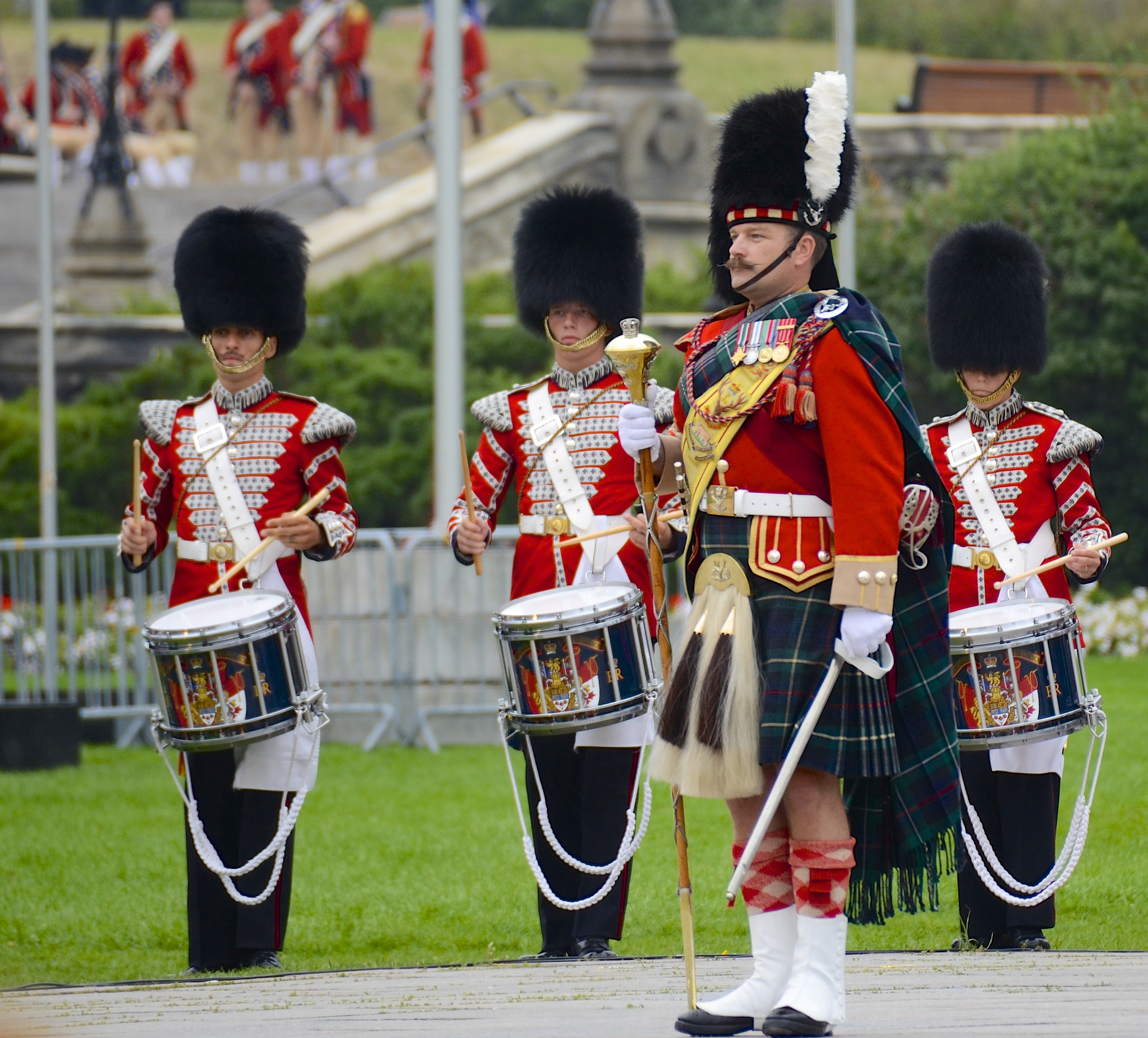
Members of the Governor General's Foot Guards performing during the Fortissimo Sunset Ceremony in 2012.

Military bands in the Canadian Armed Forces perform as a marching band in parades, military parades, or seated, in concert, and play a part in military funeral, convocation, ceremonies such as Trooping the Colour, and parades. They participate in community events such as Remembrance Day parades and band concerts. Depending on location, bands wear a mix of authorized military service dress; such as ceremonial dress (including Highland dress), service dress, and operational dress.

Military bands perform at military tattoos within and outside Canada, presenting musical mass performances, with choreographies and multi-media effects. The military bands play ceremonial and marching music, including the national anthems and patriotic songs. A concert band's repertoire includes original wind compositions, arrangements of orchestral compositions, light music, popular tunes and concert marches found in standard repertoire.

Military festivals and tattoos in Canada include:

- Canadian International Military Tattoo
- Fort Henry Sunset Ceremony
- Fortissimo Sunset Ceremony
- Hamilton Military Tattoo
- Royal Nova Scotia International Tattoo

In addition to regularly scheduled events, the Canadian Forces' pipe and drum bands occasionally compete in civilian pipe band competitions with varying degrees of success. Past notable events where Canadian Forces bands have participated in include the Canadian Armed Forces Tattoo 1967, and the Quebec City International Festival of Military Bands.

== Professional bands ==
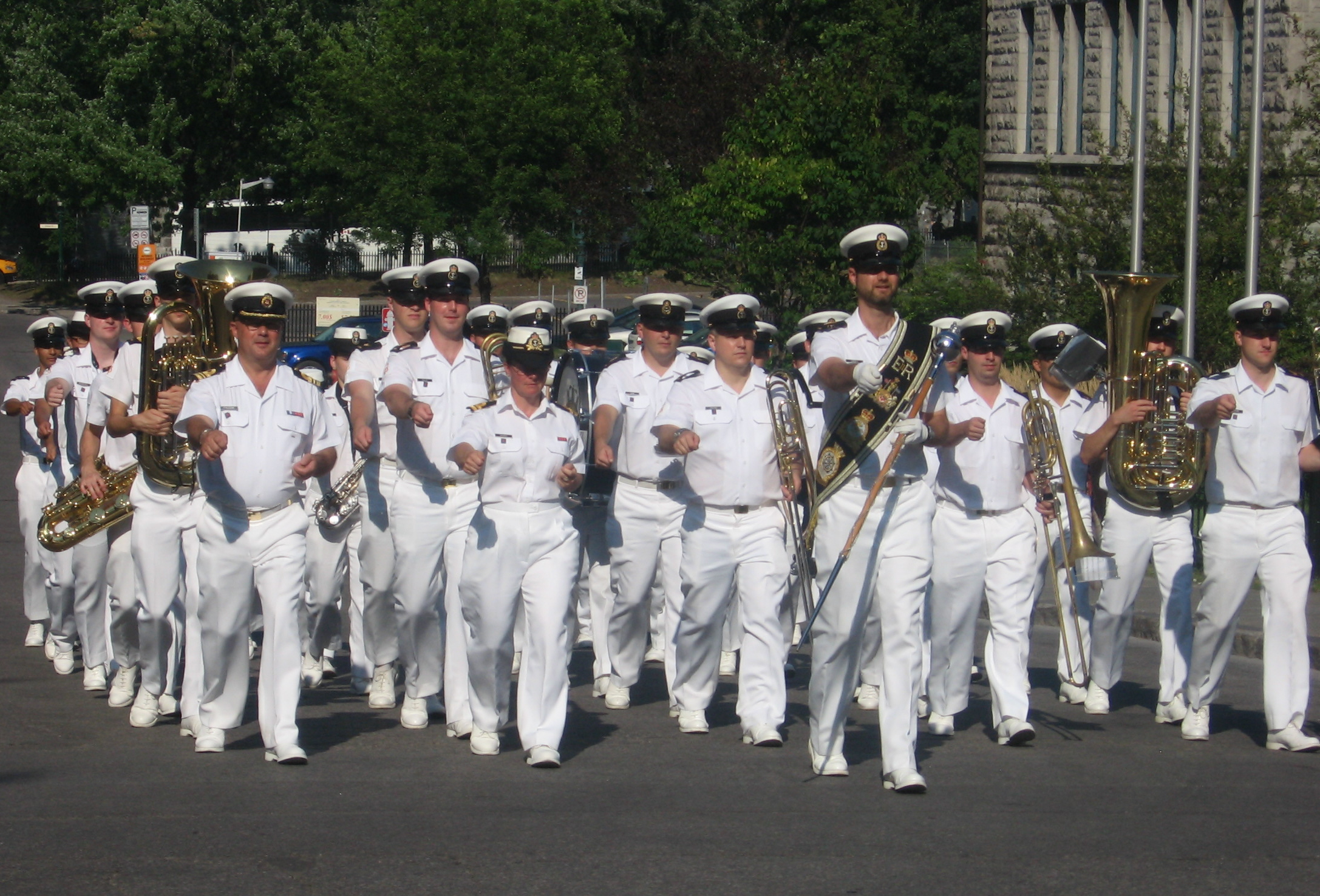
The Stadacona Band of the RCN is one of six full-time professional bands in the Canadian Armed Forces.

There are six full-time professional bands of the Canadian Armed Forces Regular Force:

- Two under the Canadian Army: the Musique du Royal 22^{e} Régiment, based in Saint-Gabriel-de-Valcartier; and the Royal Canadian Artillery Band, based in Edmonton.
- Two under the Royal Canadian Navy (RCN): the Stadacona Band representing Maritime Forces Atlantic and based in Halifax; and the Naden Band representing Maritime Forces Pacific and based in Esquimalt.
- One under the Royal Canadian Air Force (RCAF): the Royal Canadian Air Force Band, based in Winnipeg.
- One directly under CAF Headquarters and the Ministry of National Defence: the Central Band of the Canadian Armed Forces, which is the senior band in the Music Branch.

All six full-time professional bands of the Canadian Armed Forces are brass and reed bands, a band consisting of brass instruments and woodwind instruments.

== Voluntary bands ==
There are 15 voluntary bands within the Canadian Army and the RCAF. Voluntary bands are a part of the Canadian Armed Forces Regular Force, although their band members are not composed of full-time professional musicians. By custom, civilian volunteer musicians parading as part of a band may be authorized to wear the uniforms of that band as optional items. No rank insignia shall be worn unless the individual holds that rank by right. Appointment badges such as that of drum major may be worn.

=== List of voluntary bands ===
==== Canadian Army ====
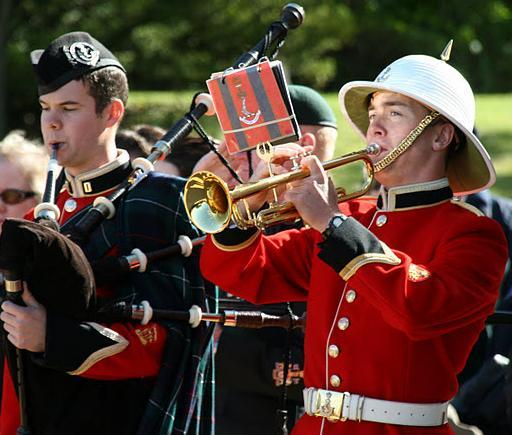
Bagpiper and trumpeter with the Band of the Royal Military College of Canada, one of several voluntary bands maintained by the Canadian Army.

The Canadian Army maintains six voluntary bands within the Canadian Army Regular Force. The Band of the Royal Military College of Canada, and the CFB Borden Brass and Reed Band are the only brass and reed voluntary bands in the army, with the other four being pipes and drum bands. Voluntary bands in the Canadian Army include:

- 2nd Canadian Mechanized Brigade Group Pipes and Drums Band
- 2nd Battalion, The Royal Canadian Regiment Pipes and Drums Band
- Band of the Royal Military College of Canada (RMC Band)
- Camp Gagetown Pipes and Drums
- Canadian Forces Base Borden Brass and Reed Band
- Canadian Forces Base Borden Pipes and Drums Band

Although not officially part of the army structure, the Communications and Electronics Garrison Band at CFB Kingston serves as a voluntary band.

==== Royal Canadian Air Force ====
The RCAF has eight authorized voluntary bands, at 4 Wing Cold Lake, 8 Wing Trenton, 12 Wing Shearwater, 14 Wing Greenwood, and 22 Wing North Bay. With the exception of 4 and 22 Wing, they consist of a voluntary brass-reed concert band and a voluntary pipe and drum band. In addition to the pipe & drum bands of the four wings, the RCAF also maintains the RCAF Pipes and Drum, a pipe and drums band. Voluntary bands in the RCAF include:

- 4 Wing Brass and Reed
- 8 Wing Brass and Reeds
- 8 Wing Pipes and Drums
- 12 Wing Pipe and Drums Band supporting 406 and 423 MHS in Shearwater N.S. and 443 MHS in Sidney, B.C.
- 14 Wing Brass and Reed Band
- 14 Wing Pipes and Drums Band
- 22 Wing Band
- Royal Canadian Air Force Pipes and Drums

== Reserve Force bands ==
The three service branches of the Canadian Armed Forces also maintain military bands for their Primary Reserve units. Reserve Force bands are typically composed of part-time musicians with the Primary Reserve, and are staffed with one or two Regular Force members who serve as musical instructors and administrators.

=== Canadian Army ===
The Canadian Army maintains a number of military bands in order to support various units of the Canadian Army Reserve.

==== Brass and reed bands ====
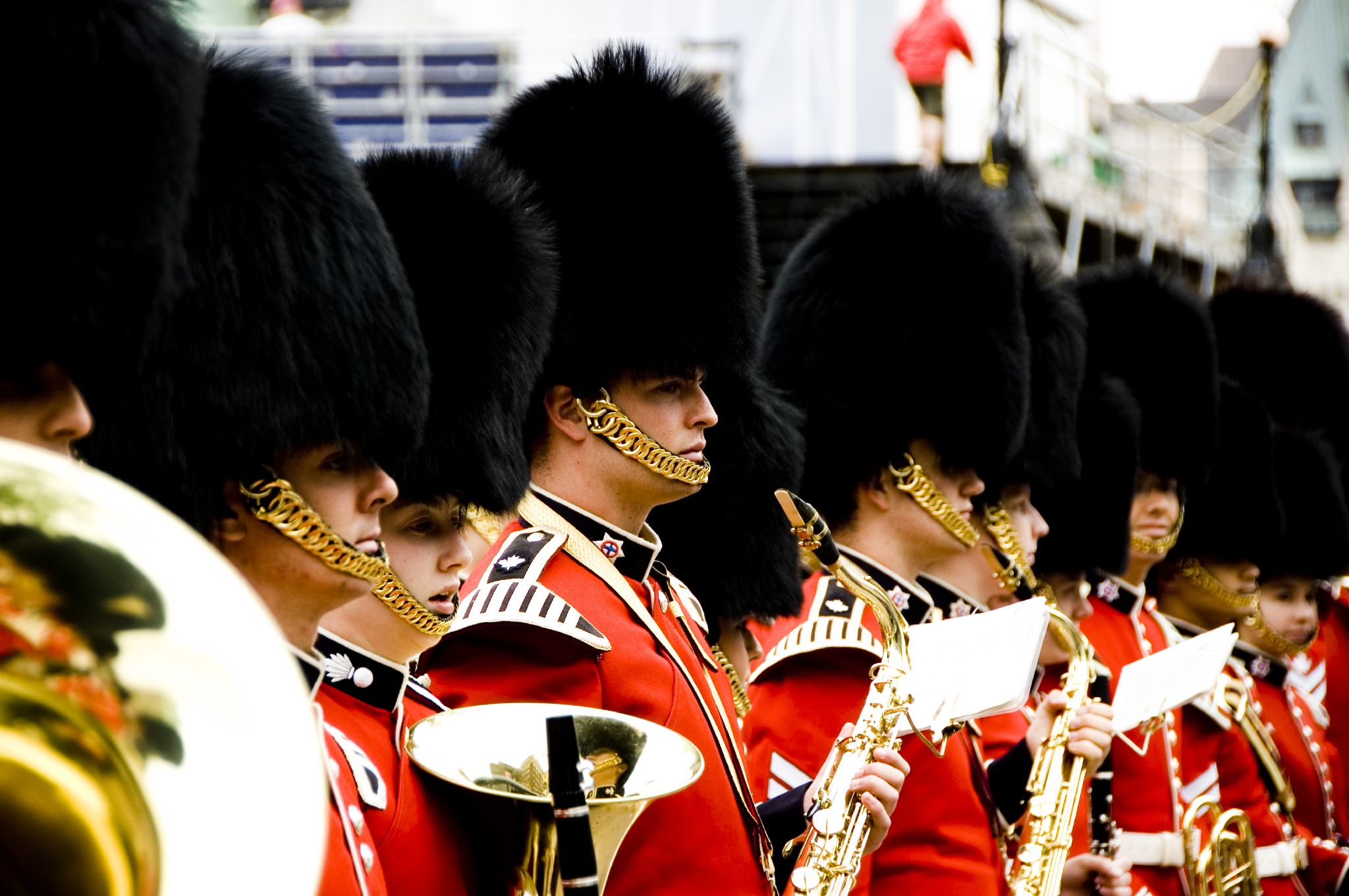
Members from the Band of the Ceremonial Guard during the Canada Day celebrations in Ottawa.

- 1st Battalion, The Royal Newfoundland Regiment Band
- 3rd Field Regiment RCA, 37 CBG (NB) Band
- 5th (BC) Field Regiment, Royal Canadian Artillery Band
- 6^{e} Bataillon Royal 22^{e} Régiment Band
- 7th Toronto Regiment RCA Band
- 15th Field Artillery Regiment RCA Band
- 36 CBG (NS) Band Halifax
- 62nd Field Artillery Regiment, RCA Band
- Band of the Ceremonial Guard
- Band of The Royal Regiment of Canada
- Le Régiment du Saguenay Band
- Les Fusiliers Mont-Royal Band
- Les Fusiliers de Sherbrooke Band
- Les Voltigeurs de Québec Band
- Regimental Band of the Governor General's Foot Guards
- Regimental Band of the Governor General's Horse Guards
- Regimental Band of The Royal Hamilton Light Infantry
- The Brockville Rifles Band
- The King's Own Calgary Regiment Band
- The Lincoln and Welland Regiment Association Band
- The Prince Edward Island Regiment (RCAC) Band
- The Regimental Band and Bugles of The Queen's Own Rifles of Canada
- The Royal Winnipeg Rifles Band
- The Windsor Regiment (RCAC) Band
- The British Columbia Regiment Band
- The Loyal Edmonton Regiment Band
- The Queen's York Rangers (1st American Regiment) (RCAC) Band
- Royal Westminster Regiment Band

==== Pipe and drums bands ====
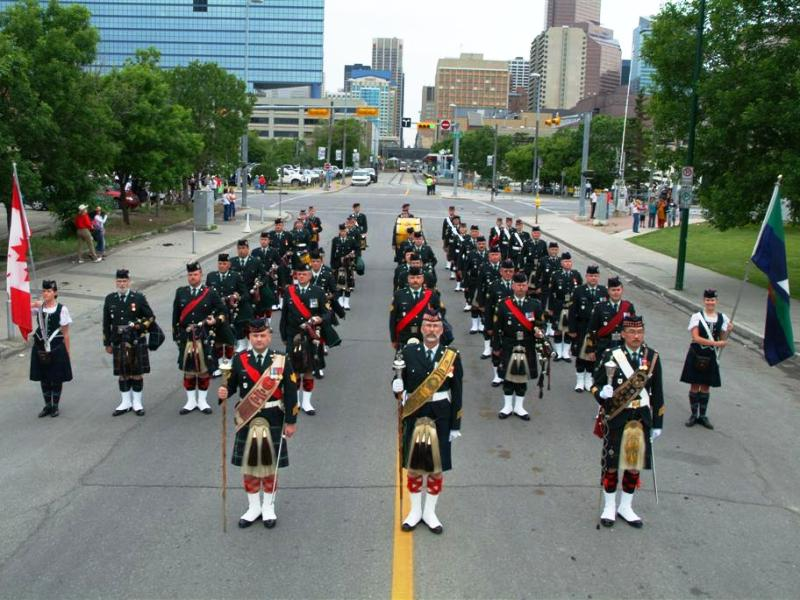
Members of the massed pipes and drums of the Seaforth Highlanders, Canadian Scottish Regiment, and The Calgary Highlanders photographed prior to participating in the Calgary Stampede parade.

- The Nova Scotia Highlanders Pipe Band
- 26th Field Regiment RCA Pipe Band
- 48th Highlanders of Canada Pipes & Drums
- 49th Field Artillery Regiment, RCA Pipe Band
- Stormont, Dundas and Glengarry Highlanders Pipe Band
- The Argyll and Sutherland Highlanders of Canada (PL) Pipe Band
- The Black Watch (Royal Highland Regiment) of Canada Pipe Band
- Regimental Pipes and Drums of The Calgary Highlanders (10th Canadians)
- The Canadian Scottish Regiment (Princess Mary's) Pipe Band
- The Cape Breton Highlanders Pipe Band
- The Essex and Kent Scottish Pipe Band
- The Lorne Scots (Peel, Dufferin and Halton) Regiment Pipe Band
- The North Saskatchewan Regiment Pipe Band
- The Pipes and Drums of The Cameron Highlanders of Ottawa
- The Queen's Own Cameron Highlanders of Canada Pipe Band
- The Royal Highland Fusiliers of Canada Pipe Band
- The Seaforth Highlanders of Canada Pipe Band
- The Toronto Scottish (Queen Elizabeth, The Queen Mothers' Own) Regiment Pipe Band

=== Royal Canadian Air Force ===
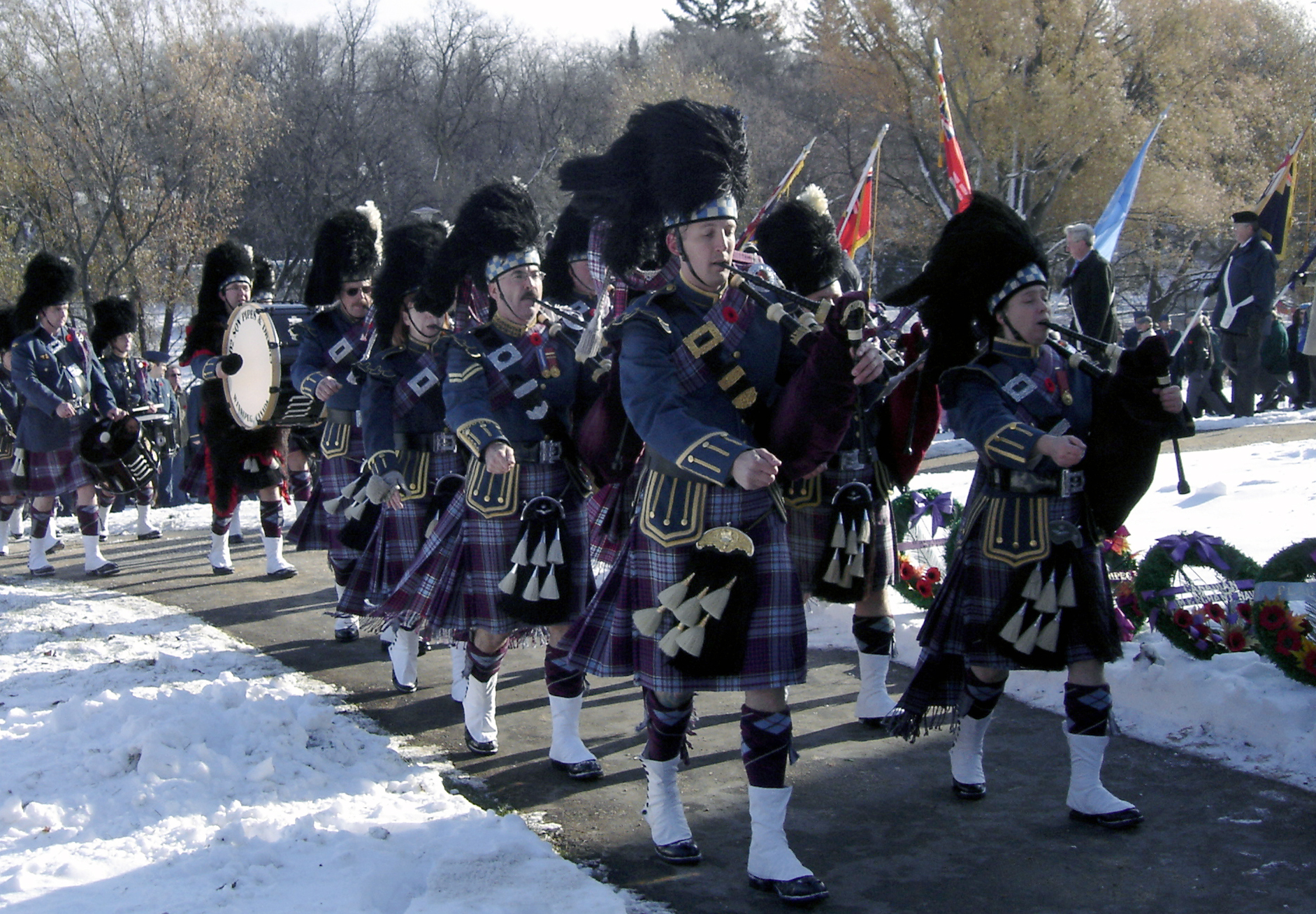
The 402 Squadron Pipes and Drums is one of three military bands operated by the RCAF Air Reserve.

The Air Reserve maintains three military bands. The 400 Tactical Helicopter Squadron Pipe Band, and the 402 Squadron Pipes and Drums are pipe and drum bands, the former based at CFB Borden, the latter based in Winnipeg. The Air Reserve also maintains one brass and reed band, the Musique du 438^{e} Escadron tactique d'hélicoptères, based in Montreal.

=== Royal Canadian Navy ===
The Canadian Forces Naval Reserve maintains six military bands. Each summer, musicians from the six active Naval Reserve bands come together to form the National Band of the Naval Reserve and perform throughout Canada. They have played at every Halifax International Tattoo since the mid-1970s, performed on Parliament Hill, at the National War Memorial, at Grey Cup parades, for royal tours and other events. All navy bands are brass and reed bands. The six active reserve bands in the RCN are:

- HMCS Chippawa Band
- HMCS Montcalm Band
- HMCS Star Band
- HMCS Tecumseh Band
- HMCS Donnacona Band
- HMCS York Band

== Former military bands ==
=== Bands converted into civilian bands ===
Several civilian-operated marching bands in Canada were originally established as military bands before being reorganized into civilian bands. Former Canadian Army bands that were reorganized into civilian-operated bands includes the Oshawa Civic Band and the Toronto Signals Band; the former formerly serving as the band for The Ontario Regiment, while the latter was formerly the band for the 2nd Armoured Divisional Signals Regiment.

The Concert Band of Cobourg (The Band of Her Majesty's Royal Marines Association, Ontario), traces its origins to the Band of the 6th Northumberland Militia, a civilian-operated band that provided musical support for the unit. The band was briefly under military administration from 1898 to 1905, as the 40th Battalion Artillery Band, before it was re-instituted as a civilian band.

=== Disbanded military bands ===
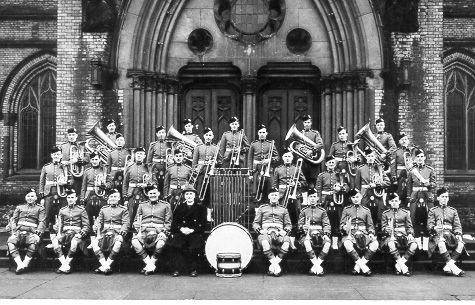
The 48th Highlanders Brass and Reed Band in 1910.

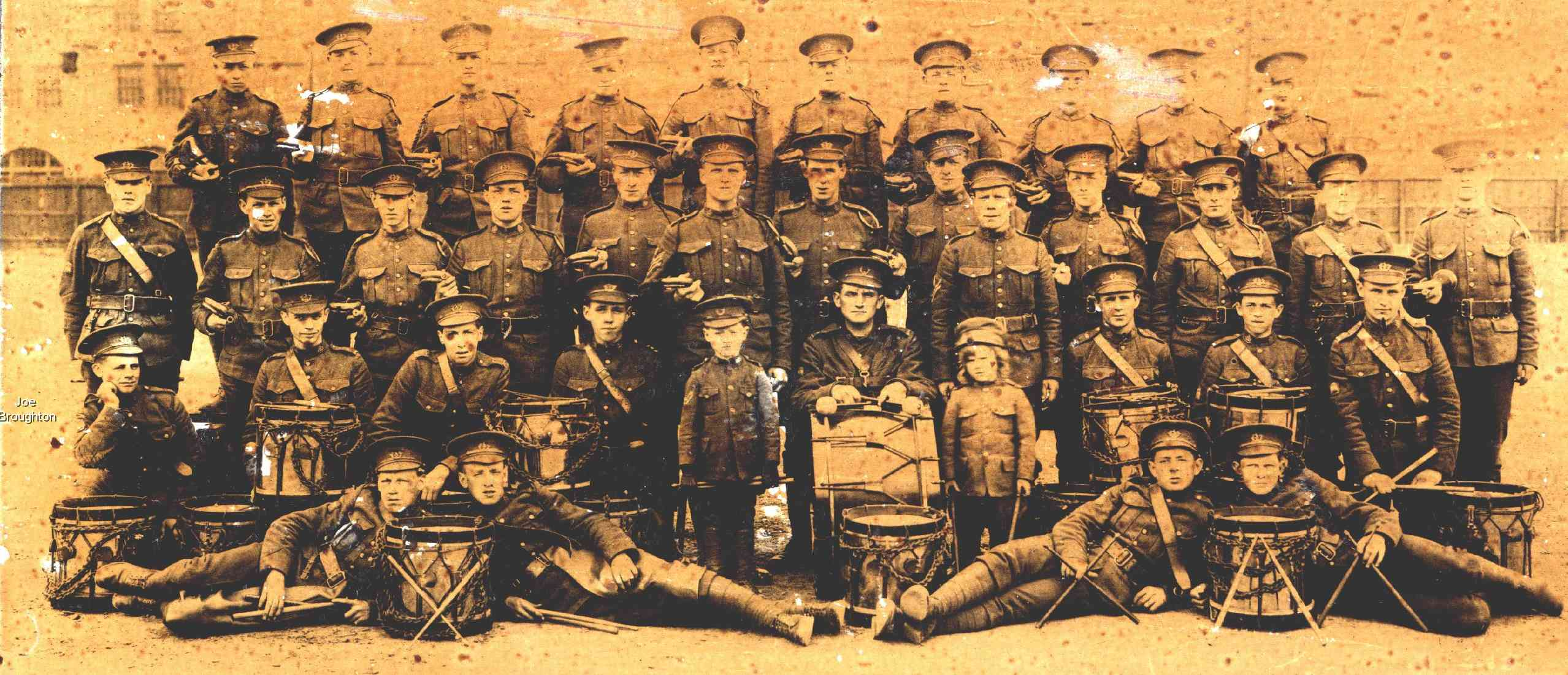
The Bugle Band of the 144th Battalion (Winnipeg Rifles), CEF.

The following is a list of notable military bands in Canada that have since been disbanded:

- The Canadian Guards Band
- 19th Medium Regiment, RCA Pipes and Drums
- Princess Patricia's Canadian Light Infantry Band
- Royal Canadian Regiment Band
- Canadian Grenadier Guards Band
- Royal Canadian Dragoons Band
- Calgary Highlanders Military Band
- Band of the Royal Canadian Corps of Signals
- Band of the Royal Canadian Engineers
- Royal Canadian Ordnance Corps Band
- Royal Canadian Army Service Corps Band
- Montreal Garrison Band
- 1 Service Battalion Band
- Land Force Western Area Band
- First Canadian Army Band
- Band of the 48th Squadron, RCE
- Hamilton Army Navy Veterans Band
- Royal Roads Military College Band
- RCAF Overseas Headquarters Band
- Women's Division Band of the RCAF
- No. 6 Bomber Group Band
- Corps of Royal Canadian Electrical and Mechanical Engineers Trumpet Band
- The Elgin Regiment Trumpet Band
- Victoria Rifles Bugle Band
- The Canadian Scottish Regiment (Princess Mary's) Brass Band
- Princess of Wales Own Regiment Bugle Band
- Elgin Regiment Trumpet Band
- CFB Lahr Pipes and Drums

== See also ==
- Authorized marches of the Canadian Armed Forces
- Canadian pipers in World War I
- Music Branch (Canadian Forces)
- List of pipe bands
- Navy bands in Canada
- List of Royal Canadian Air Force Bands
- British military bands
- United States military bands
