= Band of the Royal Canadian Engineers =

Canadian military band

The Band of the Royal Canadian Engineers was a Canadian Army military band that served briefly for 15 years from 1953 to 1968. During its entire existence, it was based in Chilliwack, British Columbia. It was the premier band in the RCE, having precedence over other small unit bands such as the Band of the 48th Squadron (active today as the Dutchmen Senior Drum & Bugle Corps). It was established at the Royal Canadian School of Military Engineering and primarily recruited from a mix of Canadian nationals as well as musicians from the United Kingdom, the Netherlands and Hungary. It has performed for members of the Canadian royal family as well as Governors General of Canada. In September 1964, the band performed during the arrival of U.S. President Lyndon B. Johnson in Vancouver for the Columbia River Treaty ceremonies. 1967 marked a busy schedule for the band. In this year, it performed during Expo 67, the Seattle Armed Forces Pageant, and the Centennial Grand Military Tattoo. Due to a mass reorganisation of Canadian military bands across the military services that came as a result of the Canadian Forces unification, the band was dissolved in 1968. It was lastly directed by Captain Leonard Camplin, who began his service with the band in 1961.

Most of the remaining members sent to the Naden Band of Maritime Forces Pacific in the Royal Canadian Navy. While others went to the CFB Chilliwack Band, who succeeded the RCE Band. It was a small band, only consisting of 7 members, who at most performed at official receptions and dinners. It was the first regular force military band to utilize the Sousaphone (an instrument that was pioneered by United States military bands). The band performed at events such as the welcoming arrival of the 1 Combat Engineer Regiment at Vancouver Airport during the Gulf War. In its duties, it often performed with the Pacific Militia Area Band. In its latter years, it was led by Warrant Officer Moe Macklin.

== See also ==
- Band of the Royal Canadian Corps of Signals
- The Band of the 15th Field Regiment, RCA
- British Columbia Regiment Band
