= Quebec City International Festival of Military Bands =

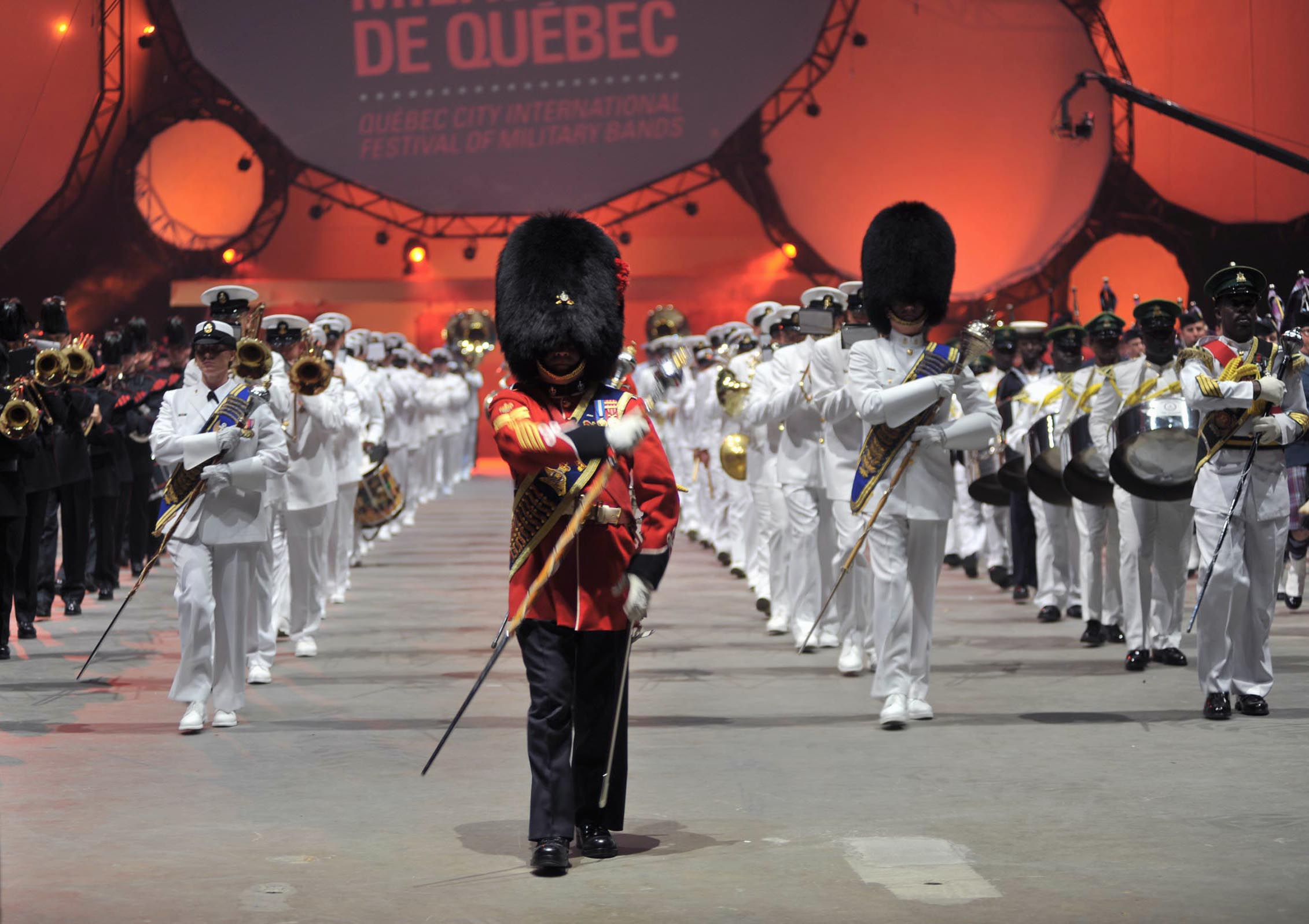
- Abbreviation: FIMMQ
- Formation: 1998
- Type: cultural event festival and tattoo
- Legal status: Ended in 2014
- Headquarters: Quebec City, Quebec, Canada
- Region served: Quebec City, Quebec
- Official language: English, French
- Website: www.fimmq.com

The Quebec City International Festival of Military Bands (FIMMQ) was a major cultural event in Quebec City that notably included a military tattoo by Canadian and foreign military bands as well as display teams. It has taken place annually in August in Quebec City from 1998 to 2013.

Created in 1998, the FIMMQ were hosted by the local Military Bands, i.e. Les Voltigeurs de Québec and the Royal 22^{e} Régiment. It welcomed, throughout the years, military and some civilian bands from Germany, Australia, Belgium, Chile, South Korea, the United States, France, Norway, the Netherlands, Poland, the United Kingdom, Russia, Singapore, Italy, Switzerland, Austria and the Czech Republic. Outdoor performances were held for the general public at various locations in and around the city and an indoor show, the Quebec City Military Tattoo, was held inside the Colisée Pepsi.

The festival was created in 1998 by Jacques DuSault, who wanted to offer outdoors music shows to emphasize the Old Quebec City. The Canadian Armed Forces were invited to contribute, with the implication of the retired Lieutenant Colonel Yvan Lachance, old ordering of the Voltigeurs de Québec, and Major Denis Bernier, who was then directing the Military Band of the Royal 22^{e} Régiment. In 2013, after 15 years in existence, the tattoo was dissolved.

== Quebec City Military Tattoo ==
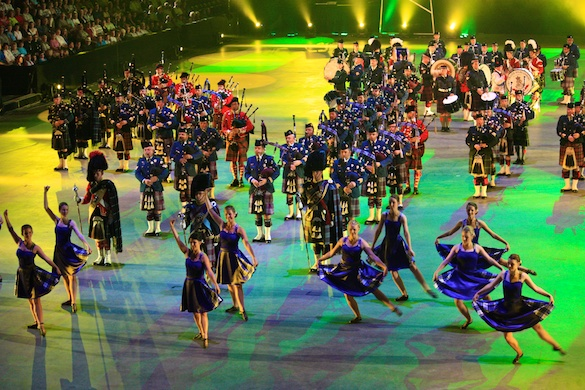
Quebec City Military Tattoo

The Quebec City Military Tattoo was an annual military tattoo that took place in Quebec City, the capital of the province of Quebec. Part of the Quebec City International Festival of Military Bands (FIMMQ), since 2005 the Quebec City Military Tattoo has staged colourful and exotic performances, presenting a music show with choreographies and multi-media effects. This event gathered all the countries that participated at the FIMMQ. Military bands presented a stunning gathering of massed pipes and drums which could count 1200 musicians.

Before this tattoo, the first show to be held in Quebec City was in 1967 as part of Canadian Armed Forces Tattoo 1967, for the 100th anniversary of Canadian confederation. It had been organised by the Canadian Army. The 2008 tattoo was the largest one ever held, highlighting the FIMMQ as 10th anniversary and the 400th anniversary of Quebec City. During this edition of the tattoo, bands such as the Alexandrov Ensemble and the Singapore Armed Forces Band perform.

== Gallery ==
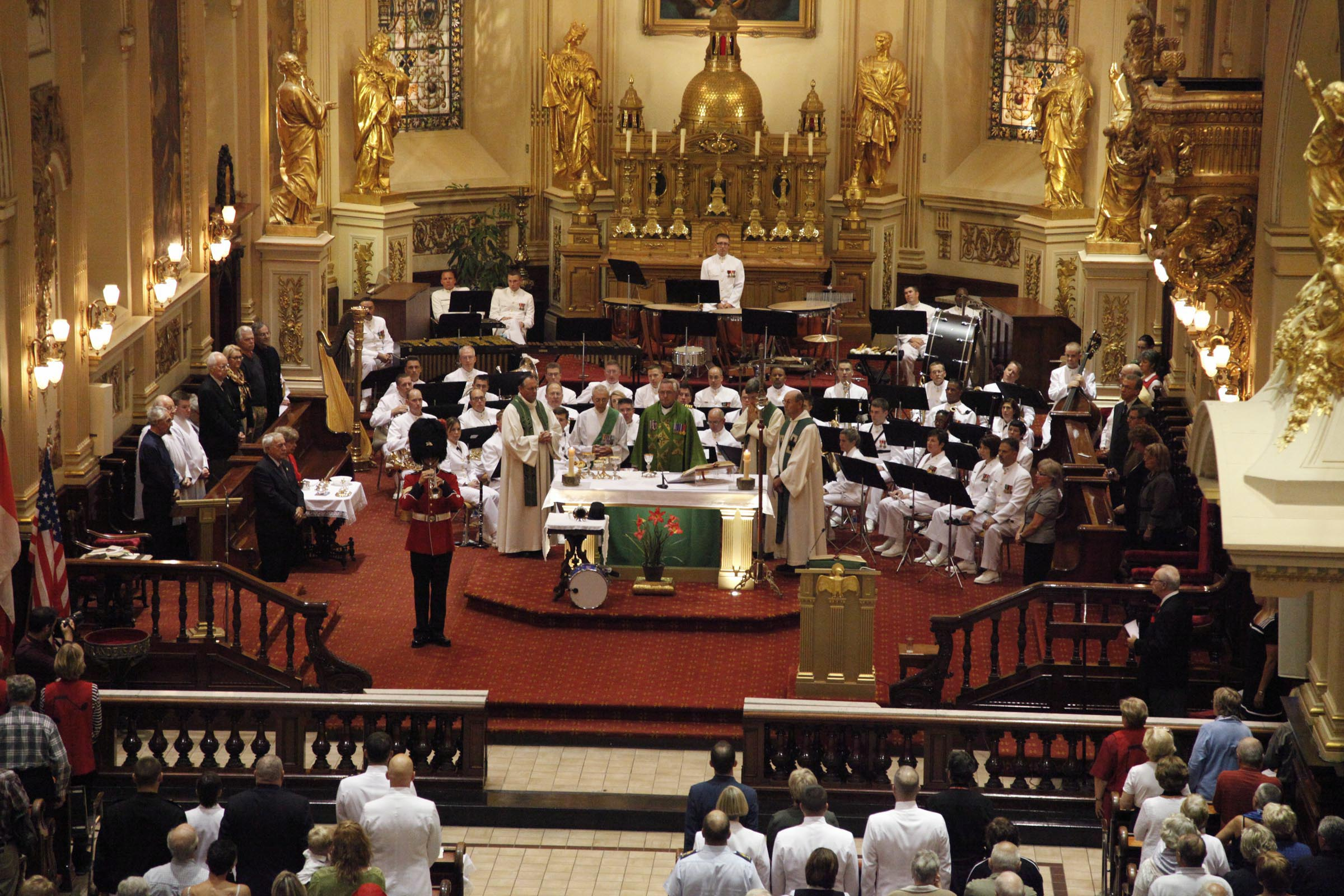
U.S. Navy Band performs in the Basilique-Cathédrale Notre-Dame de Québec as part of the closing ceremonies of the 10th annual Quebec City International Festival of Military Bands

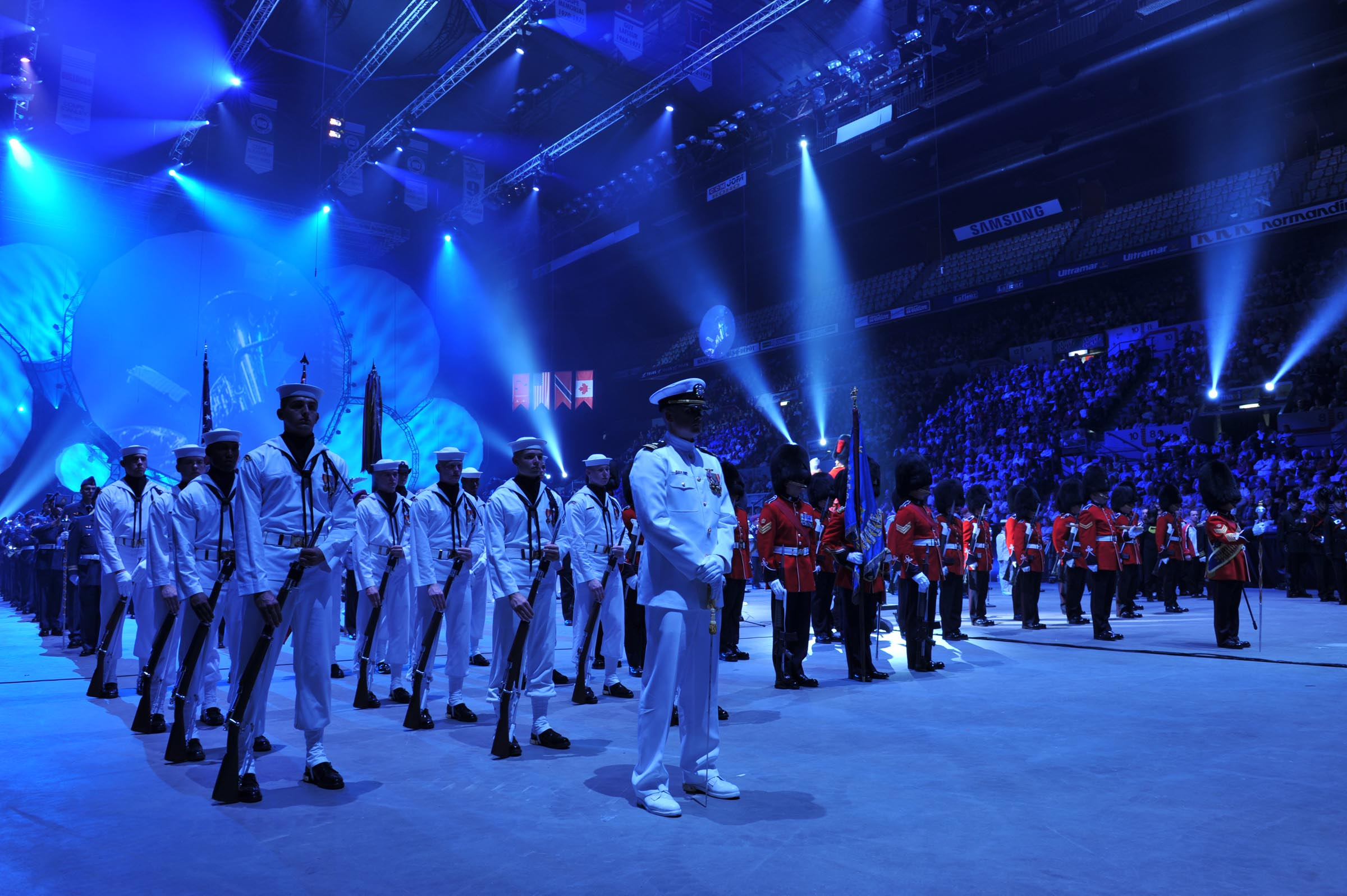
The U.S. Navy Ceremonial Guard stands at parade rest during the closing ceremony of the 10th annual Quebec International Festival of Military Bands

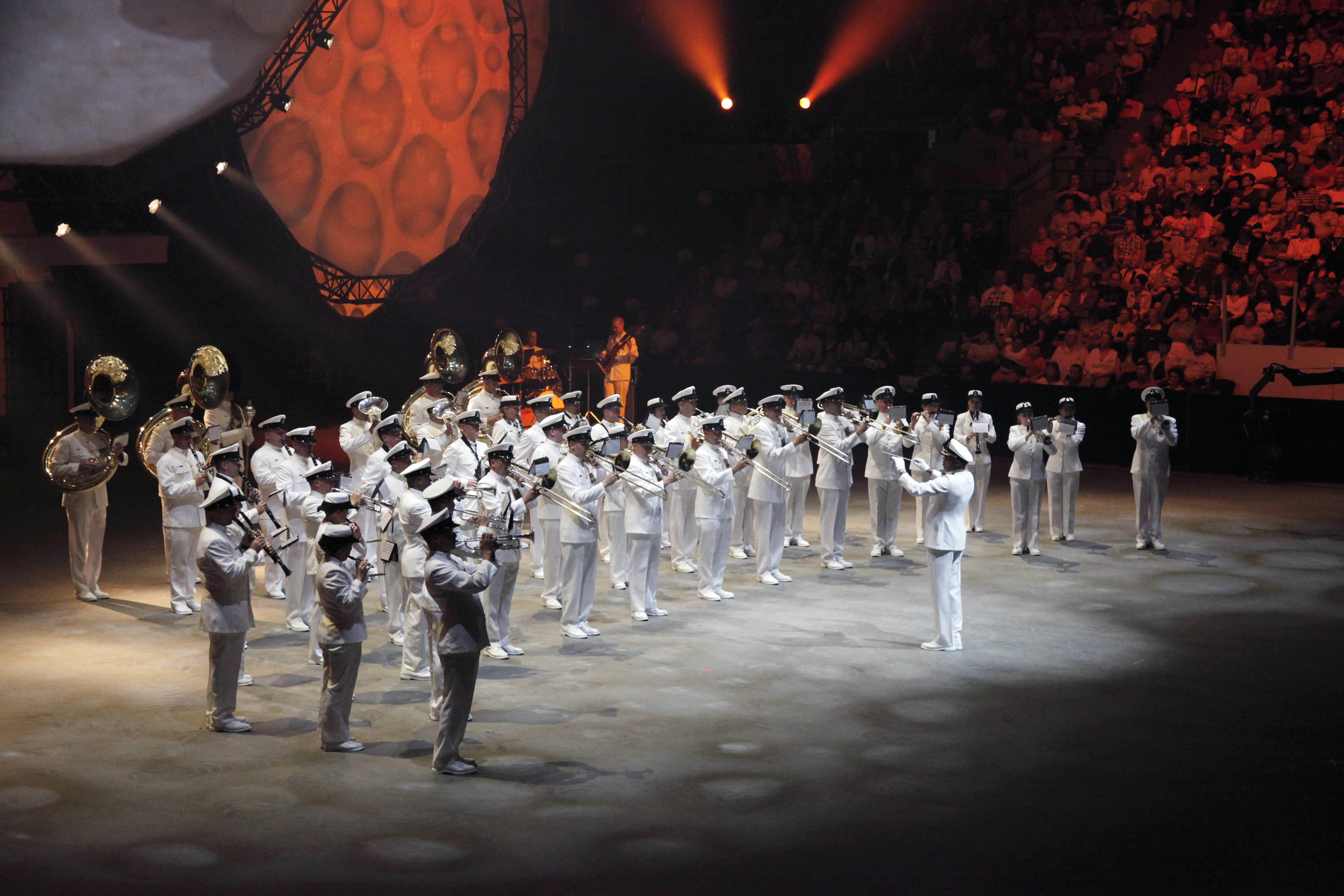
The U.S. Navy Band, led by Captain George N. Thompson, performs in the 10th annual Quebec City International Festival of Military Bands on the floor of the Pepsi Coliseum in Quebec City, Quebec
