= Loyal Edmonton Regiment Band =

The Loyal Edmonton Regiment Band (L EDMN R Band), a Canadian Army volunteer brass and reed band that serves as the de facto official military band of the Central and Northern Alberta area and the regimental band of The Loyal Edmonton Regiment (4th Battalion, Princess Patricia's Canadian Light Infantry) in Edmonton, Alberta. Operationally, it's part of the 41 Canadian Brigade Group. The band's force strength is currently at 14 personnel.

The band participates several activities:

- Military parade
- Regimental Dinners
- Concerts
- National and regimental holidays
  - Remembrance Day
  - Canada Day
- Presentation of Colours
- Funerals (state and regimental)

Outside of protocol, it also performs during significant occasions celebrated in the Province of Alberta, most notably the 100th anniversary of the Battle of Vimy Ridge. Members of the band also provide musical support to other military organizations, including Cadet Music Training Camps, Royal Canadian Artillery Band, The King's Own Calgary Regiment Band, the Band of the Ceremonial Guard and the Canadian Forces School of Music.

== History ==
The band was established in April 1908 as the 101st Regiment Band. Most of its 25 members came from the local citizens band. A bugle band was also organized for the regiment, with age and height requirements having to be met for buglers. The band was deployed to France with the regiment during the First World War, becoming the first allied military band to arrive in Europe. The band notably led and is famed for leading the unit into the Battle of Mont Sorrel. During the Second World War, the band was deployed once again, this time to the United Kingdom, and performed at many public and private functions in the country.

== Special ensembles ==
It had the benefit of three bands: a military band with 36 members, a bugle band of 29, and a pipe band of 13 pipers.

- Parade Band
- Concert Band
- Jazz Ensemble
- Drumline
- Clarinet Choir
- Pipes and Drums

=== Drumline ===
The drumline is one of two in the province of Alberta, with the other being attached to Princess Patricia's Canadian Light Infantry. The drumline has performed at hockey games supporting Albertan hockey and football groups, specifically the Edmonton Oilers and the Edmonton Eskimos, against other sporting groups. In early 2018, the drumline took part in the Whitecourt Woodlands Military Tattoo commemorating the 20th anniversary of the 721 Hawk Royal Canadian Air Cadets Squadron.

=== Pipes and Drums ===
In autumn of 2017, the 49th Battalion Pipes and Drums was founded with 7 pipers and 8 drummers in its ranks. Many cane from the regiment, while a small number also came from the 1 Field Ambulance and the 41 Service Battalion. The entire init was led at the start by Pipe Major Sergeant Lance McFadzen It provides instruction to cadet musicians of the 2551 Princess Patricia's Canadian Light Infantry Army Cadets and the 570 Sir Winston Churchill Air Cadets. Its first performances began in May 2018 at mess dinners.
