= Toronto Signals Band =

Canadian marching band and drum and bugle corps

The Toronto Signals Band (abbreviated to "Sigs") is a Canadian marching band and drum and bugle corps based in Toronto, Ontario. Although it is not a Canadian military band by virtue of being under the Music Branch of the Canadian Forces, it is directly affiliated with the 32 Signal Regiment of the Royal Canadian Corps of Signals. In this arrangement with the regiment, the band serves as a "Duty Band" on a volunteer basis. The band is nicknamed "Canada’s Marching Ambassadors".

The band was formed in 1926, as part of the 2nd Armoured Divisional Signals Regiment. In 1959, the band left the Canadian Army to form the famed Drum Corps, "Canada's Marching Ambassadors". Following the Unification of the Canadian Armed Forces in the late 1960s and early 1970s, the band fell out of place in reformed Canadian Army and was finally restructured as an independent unpaid organization in 1973. The band continued as a voluntary organization, maintaining the traditions of the military band. In 1999, the band welcomed women to join the ranks, which in 2020 comprised 20% of its membership.

It has performed for audiences throughout Canada and the United States, in events such as parades, concerts, military tattoos and drum corps shows. Since the trophy's inception in 1955, the band has won first place for the Elwood Hughes Trophy at the annual Warriors Day Parade of the Canadian National Exhibition 36 times, more recently in 2018. The band leads 32 Signal Regiment during an annual Remembrance Day Parade at York Cemetery.

== See also ==
- 78th Highlanders (Halifax Citadel) Pipe Band
- Oshawa Civic Band
- Band of the Royal Canadian Corps of Signals
