= Streamliners =

Streamliners are streamliner trains. Streamliners could also be:

- Streamliners (Illinois Terminal Railroad), three equipment sets owned by the Illinois Terminal Railroad
- Hal Roach's Streamliners, a set of comedy films directed by Hal Roach
- The Streamliners, a former band in the Royal Canadian Air Force
