= Musique des Voltigeurs de Québec =

Canadian military band

La Musique des Voltigeurs de Québec
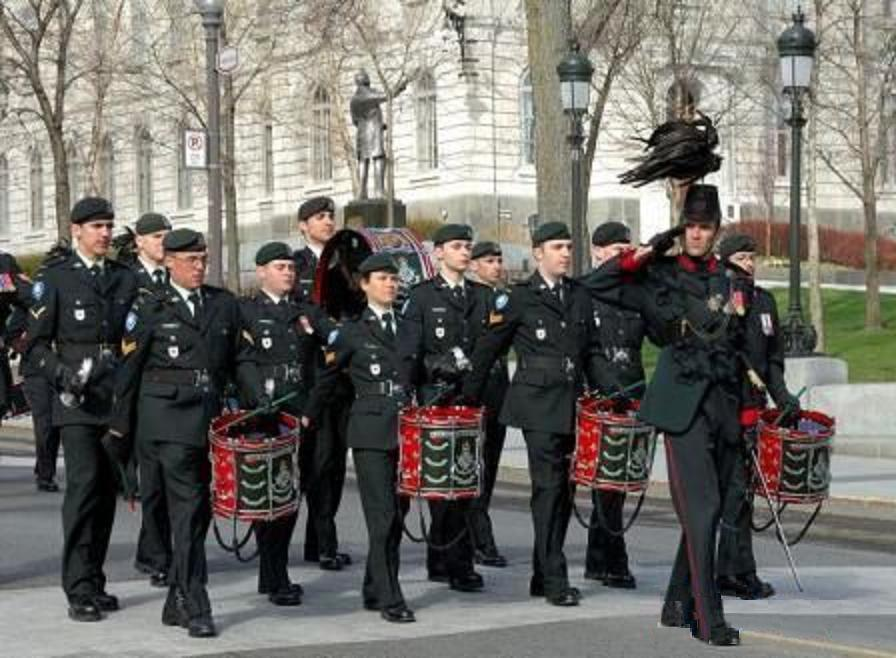
- The band at the Quebec City International Festival of Military Bands in August 2012.
- Active: February 14, 1866−present
- Country: Canada
- Branch: Canadian Army
- Type: Military band
- Size: 40 members
- Part of: Les Voltigeurs de Québec
- Headquarters: Quebec City Armoury, Quebec City
- Anniversaries: June 4

Commanders
- Music Director: Major François Dorion
- Notable commanders: Joseph Vézina; Charles H. Lapointe

The La Musique des Voltigeurs de Québec is the regimental band of the Les Voltigeurs de Québec. As of 2019 it was led by Captain François Dorion, a professional saxophonist and percussionist and a member of the regiment since 1991.

It was created on February 14, 1866, as the first francophone military band, and quickly gained a reputation among authorities and the general public. The band was instrumental in the first performance of "O Canada" in 1880 at the National Congress of the St. John the Baptist Society. It went through many reorganizations during both world wars that shaped the band into its current form.

== Traditional and modern activities ==
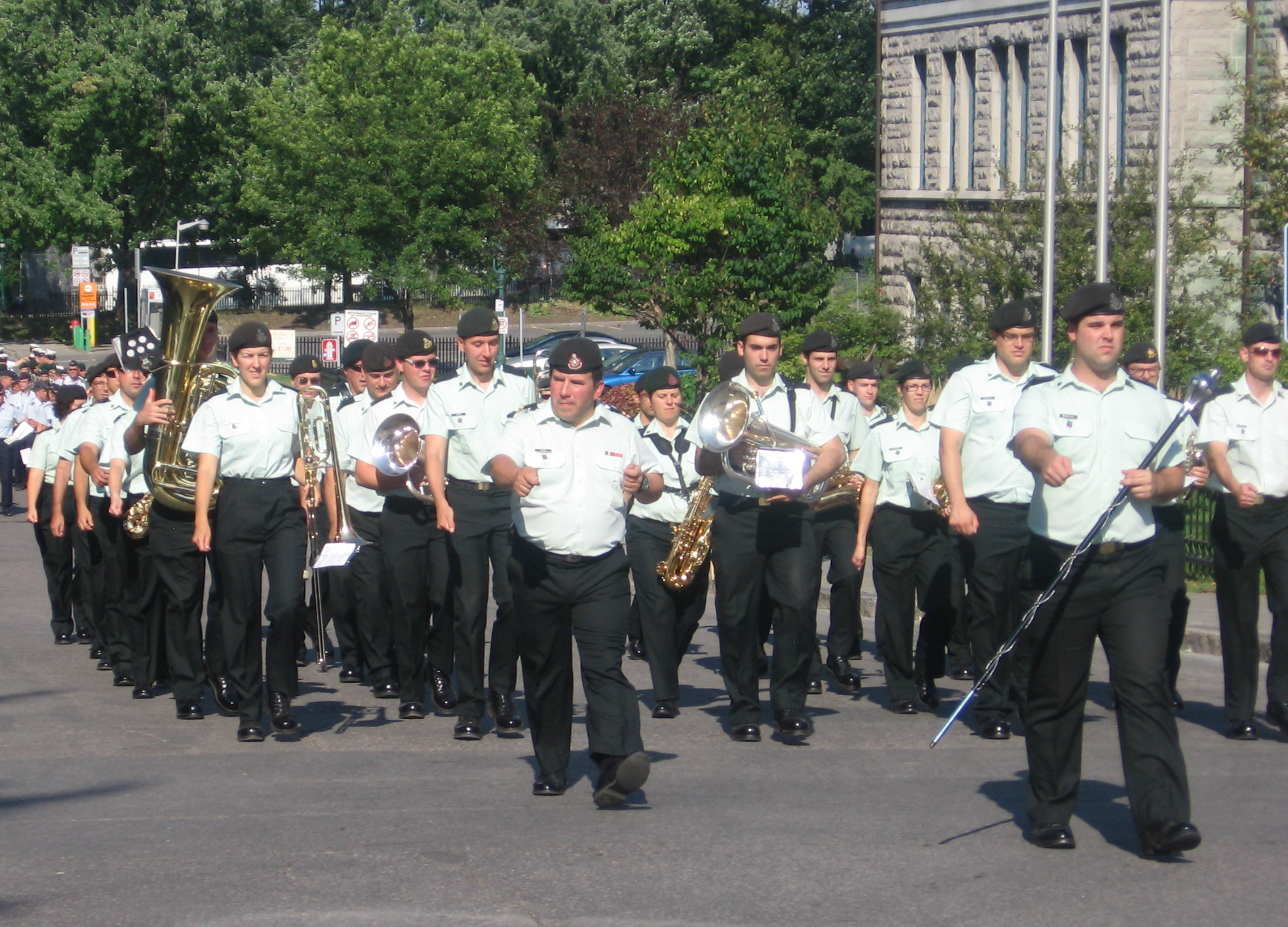
The band in 3B service dress.

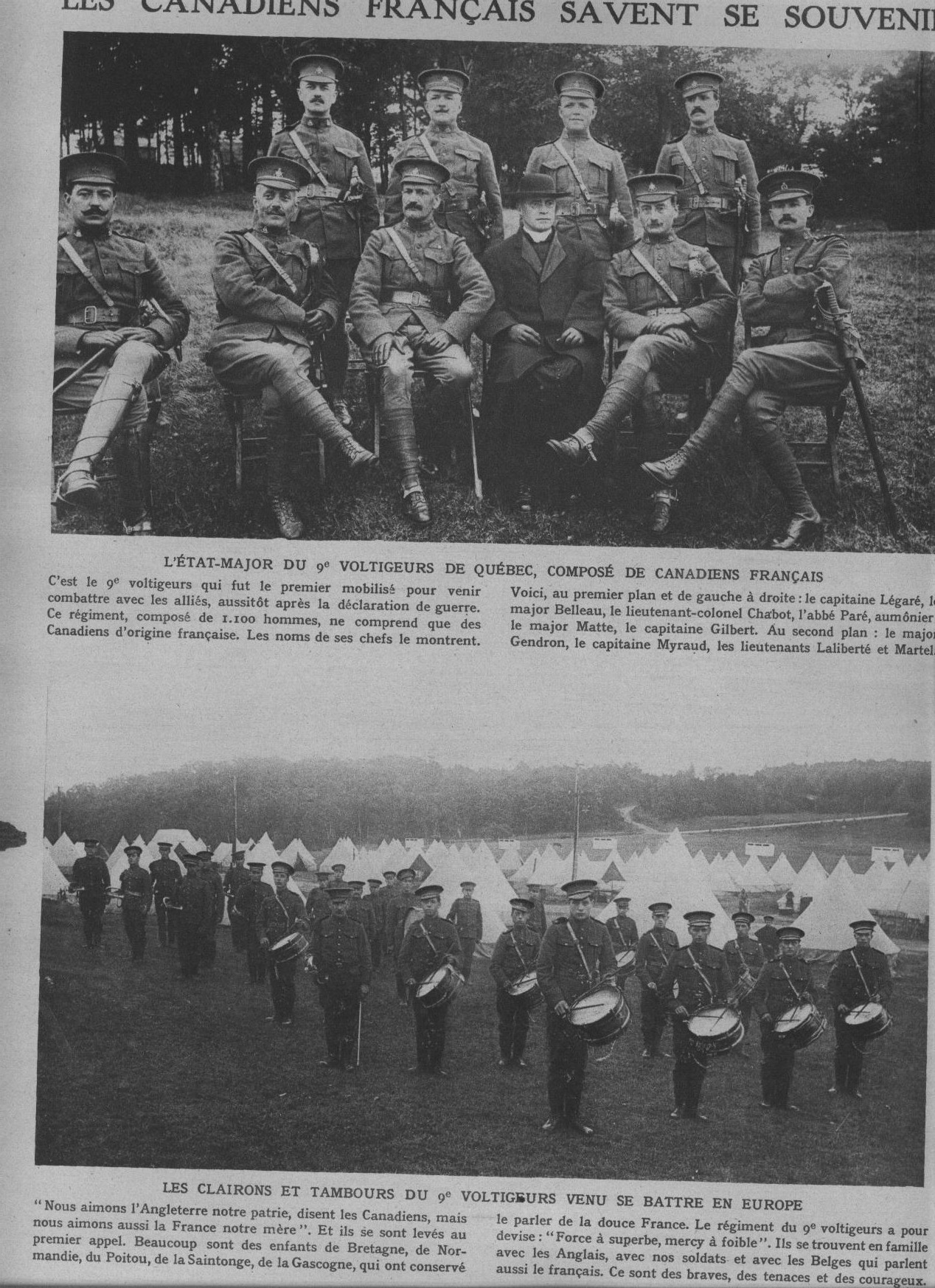
The regimental drum and bugle corps (bottom) pictured in a section of the newspaper Le Miroir, 15 November 1914

The Voltigeurs musical schedule includes several activities:

- Military parades
- Regimental dinners
- Concerts
- Regimental holidays
- State dinners
- Presentation of Colours
- Graduation parades

The musicians of the band are, for the most part, professionals trained at the Conservatoire de Québec and the Faculty of Music at Laval University. It has recorded and released many albums, with the most recent one being launched in 2008 to commemorate the 400th anniversary of Quebec City. The band participated in a number of editions of the Quebec City International Festival of Military Bands until the tattoo's final event in 2013. In 2018, the band participated in the reopening of the Quebec City Armoury by Prime Minister Justin Trudeau.

Following the example of the Queen's Own Rifles of Canada Band & Bugles, the band also has a drum and bugle corps, being one of the few in the Canadian Armed Forces (CAF) in active service.

== See also ==
- Les Voltigeurs de Québec
- La Musique du Royal 22^{e} Régiment
- Canadian military bands
- Military band
