= Canadian Women's Army Corps Band =

Canadian Army military band

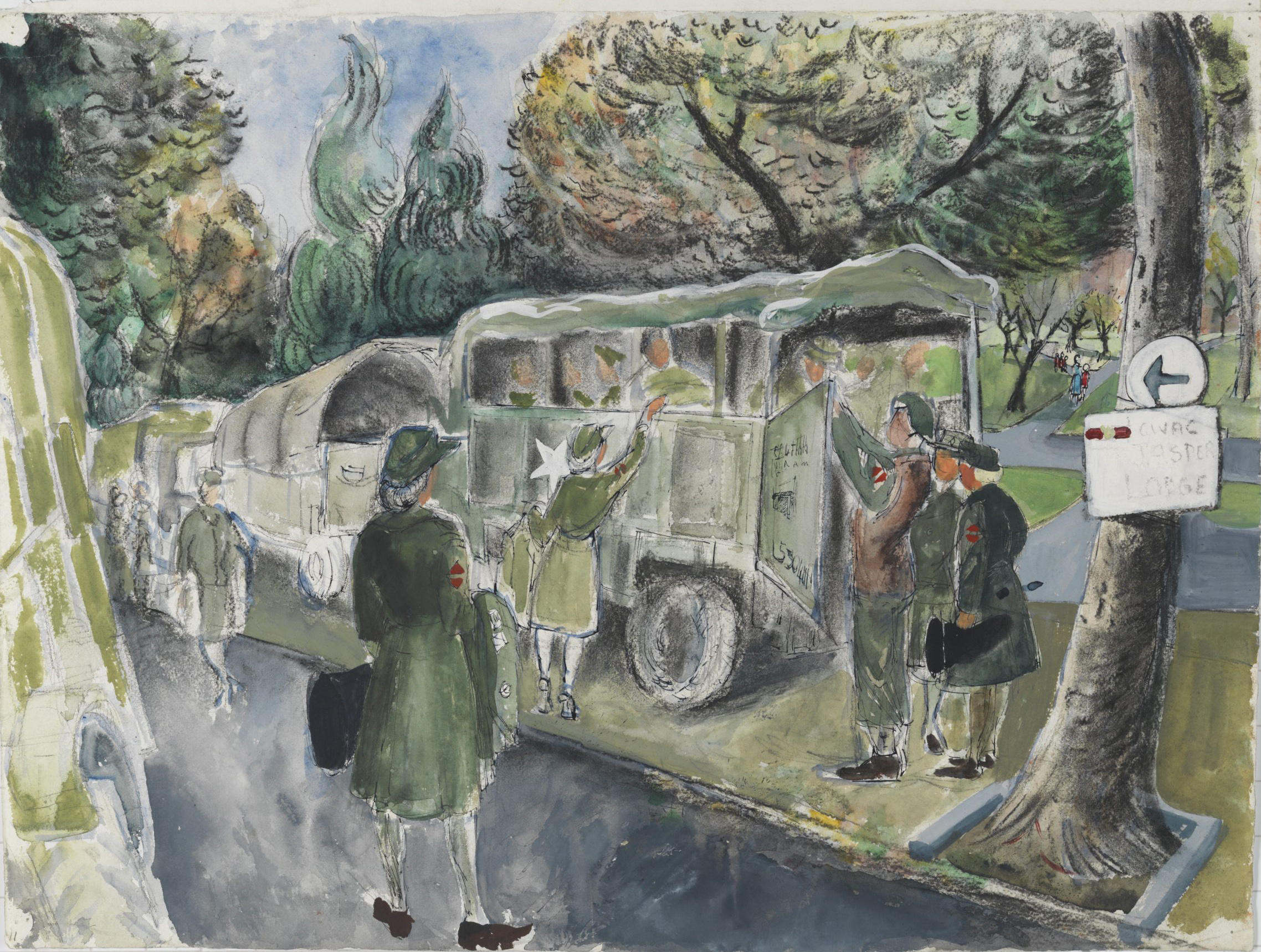
The Canadian Women's Army Corps Brass Band leaving for a concert in Apeldoorn, 1945.

The Canadian Women's Army Corps Band (CWAC Band) was an organized Canadian Army military band that was in service during the Second World War. It consisted of both the CWAC Brass Band and the CWAC Pipe Band, who are sister ensembles to each other. At the same time of its service, various all-female bands were operated throughout the services, including the RCAF Women's Division Band (notably led by Maurice Dunmall from 1943-1944) in the RCAF. It was intended to improve the perception of women in the military and encourage more women to join the Canadian Women's Army Corps (CWAC). Although the CWAC was not an infantry regiment, and as such did not take part in massed pipe band performances at the Victory Parades, the CWAC Band played an important role in supporting the First Canadian Army overseas, particularly in Europe. Because of this, it had the distinction of being the only active-service women's pipe band in the Commonwealth of Nations during the war as well as the only women's military pipe band in Canadian history.

== History ==
The CWAC Pipe Band was formed on 8 August 1942, with Pipe Major Lillian M. Grant (1916–1996) from Victoria being given the role band leader. The brass band was formed on the same day with Nadia [Svarich] McKean being appointed to a similar position. Grant was previously the band leader of "The Highland Lassies" pipe band. At full strength, the pipe band consisted of 27 drummers and pipers, including one from the United States. The nucleus of the band came from British Columbia where six pipers and four drummers began practising in the old Hotel Vancouver, which was then renamed to Vancouver Barracks. In 1943, pipers went to Ottawa, where they recruited another six pipers and four drummers. After a recruiting tour of Canada, it began a more extensive tour of the country the following year. Up until July 1945, the band used man-size Scottish kilts, which was changed after it was determined by the National Defence Headquarters that it violated Scottish traditions, after which it was made longer and therefore more suitable for women. The band was deactivated in 1946 following the conclusion of the war.

== Performances during its service ==
When it still existed, the band completed the following performances:

- During a tour of Kitchener, Ontario, the band entertained the 11th Canadian General Hospital in an outdoor performance.
- The pipe band performed at Camp Lejeune in North Carolina for female marines and the United States Marine Corps Women's Reserve Band.
- It toured Paris, parading on the Champs Elysées, with General Georges Vanier taking the salute. A reception for the band was also held in Tuileries Garden by General Vanier.
- In spring 1945, the band was sent to Pennsylvania to promote their war bond drive.
- Following Victory in Europe Day, the Pipe Band travelled to. Europe the remaining Canadian troops in England, the Netherlands, Belgium, Germany, and France.
- The CWAC Brass Band performed on the route from the Royal Palace of Amsterdam to the City Theatre on 25 July 1945.

== See also ==
- 404th Armed Service Forces Band
- 543rd Air Force Band
