= 48th Highlanders of Canada Pipes & Drums =

Canadian Forces pipe band

The 48th Highlanders of Canada Pipes and Drums is an authorized pipe band in the Canadian Forces and is currently located at Moss Park Armoury in Toronto, Ontario. The current pipe major is Master Warrant Officer Alexander Brown.

== History ==
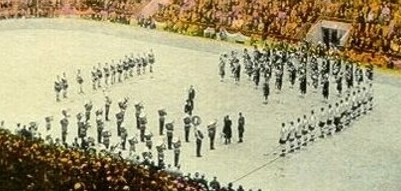
The Pipes and Drums with the Band of the Royal Grenadiers on a postcard during the opening night ceremony of Maple Leaf Gardens.

In its first year, the band was organized with a total strength of 14 pipers and 5 drummers combined. During World War I, the pipe band accompanied the regiment to Europe where it led it into battle. The pipes and drums have played at every Toronto Maple Leafs home opening game at both Maple Leaf Gardens and the Air Canada Centre since their performance at the opening of the new Maple Leaf Gardens on 12 November 1931 at the request of Conn Smythe (a major in the First World War). It performed in Toronto for the Trooping of the Colour in 1967 and the Scottish World Festival at the Canadian National Exhibition from 1972 to 1981. In 1985 it performed in the Netherlands for the ruby jubilee of the liberation of that country. In 1987, it was invited to perform in Bermuda and that same year, it participated in the Royal Nova Scotia International Tattoo. In 1990, the pipe band was the largest military pipe band in the Commonwealth of Nations. In 1999, the pipe band lead the parade from Maple Leaf Gardens to the Air Canada Centre, when the Maple Leafs moved there for their area of operations. The regimental pipe and drums provided musical accompaniment for the G7 summit in 1988 and for Queen Elizabeth II in 1998.

=== Contemporary activities ===
It has participated in many of the military and state functions in Toronto, including royal visits such as the one from Queen Elizabeth II in 2010. leading the marchpast on Wellington Street during the Remembrance Day Parade in Toronto. The band has taken part in the funerals of former members of the regiment and state funerals of public figures in Ontario. The band also performs regularly at Royal Winter Fair. The pipes and drums continues to perform both on military occasions and other engagements in the United States, Scotland, and Canada.

== Uniform ==
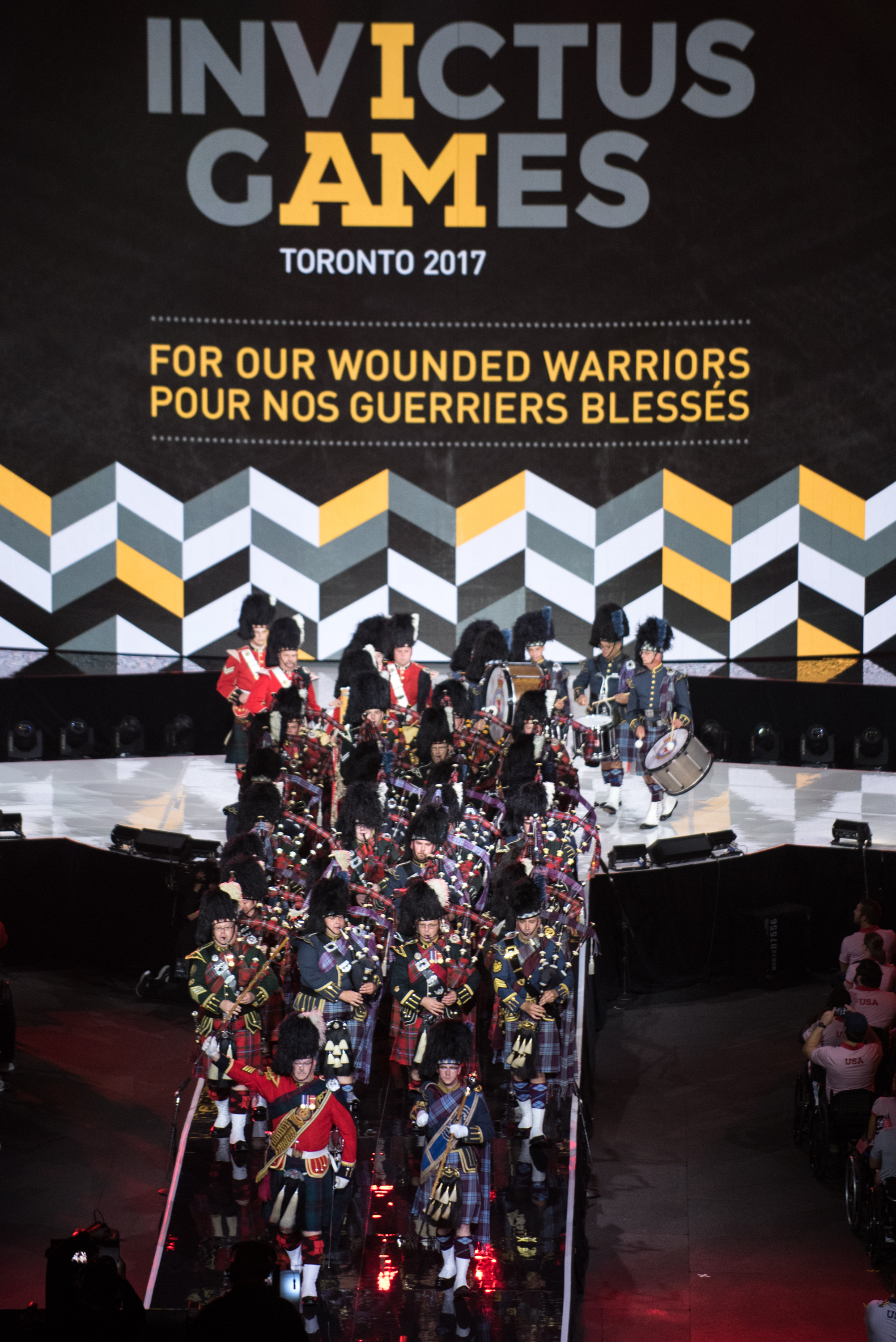
The 48th Highlanders Pipes and Drums and the 400 Squadron Pipes and Drums at the 2017 Invictus Games.

The uniform of the pipes and drums is akin to the traditional Scottish military dress that includes kilts and its unique tartan. Its headgear is a feather bonnet that is worn as a type of regimental identifier. Less formal dress uniforms have either consisted of a standard military service dress (either battle dress, DEU or shirtsleeves) or Highland dress.

== Pipe Majors ==
The following have served as pipe majors of the unit:

- Robert Ireland (1892–1895)
- Norman MacSwayed (1895–1898)
- Farquhar Beaton (1898–1913)
- James R. Fraser (1913–1952)
- Archie Dewar (1952–1965)
- J. Ross Stewart (1965–1975)
- Reay Mackay (1975–1985)
- Alexander Dewar (1985–2007)
- Iain Lang (2007-2022)
- Alexander Brown (2022 to present)

== Related brass and reed band ==
The 48th Highlanders of Canada maintained three musical units attached under its regimental structure since it was established in 1891. A year after the unit was founded, the music in the unit consisted of a pipes and drums, a military band and a bugle band. The Military Band was under the direction of John Griffin and the Pipes and Drums under Robert Ireland. The Military Band became so notable that it earned the nickname "Canada's Crack Military Band" due to its growing popularity. The military band also continued to perform frequently, in its own right and with the Pipes and Drums. In 1981, the band, joined by the bands of both the Toronto Scottish and the Royal Regiment of Canada performed at Wembley Stadium for a military tattoo involving over 1,500 musicians of the Royal Marines Band Service, the British Army and the Royal Air Force Music Services. The band was officially struck off strength in the 60's as part of the unification of the forces but has continued as a volunteer band since that time and is still active today.

The following officers were Bandmasters and Directors of Music of the Military Band:

- Captain John Slatter (1896–1944)
- Warrant Officer Albert Dobney (1944–1954)
- Major Donald Keeling (1954–1977)
- Captain Thomas Whiteside (1977–1983)
- Captain William J. Hughes (1983–1988)
- Captain Roland G. White (1988-2000)
- Captain Dennyy Ringler
- Captain Brian MacInnes
- Captain Mike Lawson
- Captain Paul van der Bank ( - 2022)

== Albums ==
The band has released the following CDs:

- Pipes And Drums Of The 48th Highlanders Of Canada (1957)
- The 48th Highlanders Of Canada – Marce Scozzesi – Cornamuse E Tamburi Del 48° Highlanders (1969)
- The 48th Highlanders Of Canada – The Bands of the 48th Highlanders of Canada: Pipes & Drums – Military Band (1986)
- Scottish Heritage: The Pipes & Drums Of The 48th Highlanders Of Canada
- Amazing Grace: All Time Bagpipe Favorites
- Here Comes The Famous 48th!

== See also ==
- Music Branch (Canadian Forces)
- The Pipes and Drums of The Cameron Highlanders of Ottawa
