= Royal Roads Military College Band =

Former marching band

- School: Royal Roads Military College
- Location: Hatley Park
- Founded: 1975 (defunct 1995)
- Fight song: "Hatley Park"

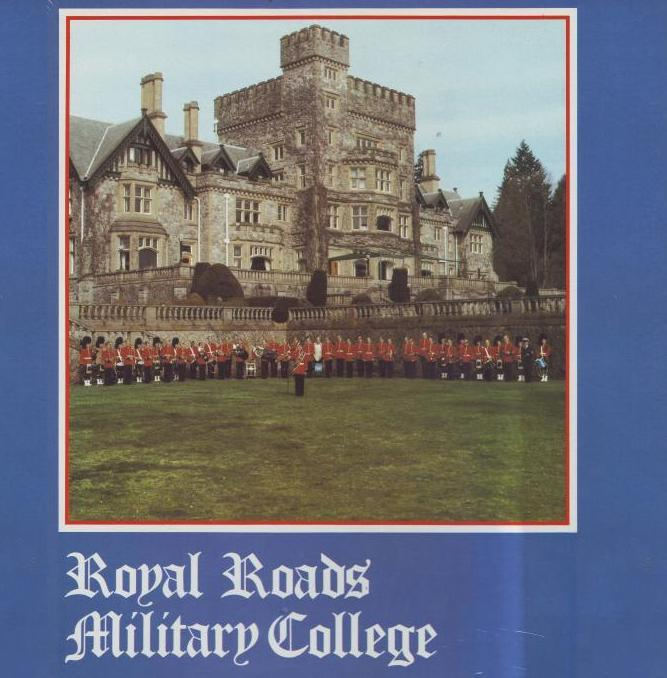
An RRMC Band album.

The Royal Roads Military College Band was the college military marching band for the Royal Roads Military College in Hatley Park, near Victoria, British Columbia, Canada. It was formed in 1975. The band was disbanded in 1995 following the closing of Royal Roads Military College.

== History ==
In 1955, the then 15 year old RRMC had a drum and bugle corps. During its existence it had performed at limited occasions, slowly evolving from a purely percussionist group. Twenty years later, a full brass and reed band was formed. By the end of the bugle band's existence, it was mostly composed of cadets from No.3 Squadron. Warrant Officer George Dunn became the college's first full-time Bandmaster, serving from 1975 to 1979. During his tenure, he obtained the equipment needed to create a Pipe Band which was attached to the brass and reed band. The band was authorized to form a 15-member voluntary Pipe Band (consisting of 10 Pipers and 5 Drummers) on 12 January 1978. The Ex-Cadet Club provided the kilts that same year and gave the band feather bonnets in 1980. The band was part of the welcoming honors for the Royal Visit of Queen Elizabeth II to the province in 1983, with the then bandmaster composing a slow march titled Dunsmuir Castle, arranged for the massed bands of the RRMC. It was named after coal magnate James Dunsmuir. Since the MacKenzie tartan was initially adopted by Royal Military College of Canada (the senior military college), it became the tartan for all military college pipe bands including the one at RRMC. In 1990, a request to the National Defence Headquarters in Ottawa to adopt the Clan Murray tartan, was endorsed and was unveiled a year later in time for the graduation parade.

== Repertoire ==
The bands performed traditional military, pop, modern and highland music, as well as a few jazz and contemporary numbers. The repertoire of the band followed the following formula:

- RRMC Marches
  - Quick: "Hatley Park"
  - Slow: "Royal Roads Slow (Going Home)"
  - "The Standard of St. George" (the former unofficial march)
- "March of the Peers (played in honour of academic staff of the Canadian Defence Academy)
- Tri-Service March Past
  - "Heart of Oak" (Maritime Command)
  - "Celer Paratus Callidus" (Land Force Command)
  - "RCAF March Past" (Air Command)
- "The Maple Leaf Forever" (For the marching of the colours at RRMC parades)
- "Pathfinders" (During the precision drill display at the annual Sunset Ceremony)
- "The British Grenadiers" (for Advance and Review Orders)
- Traditional pipes and drums tunes
  - "Scotland the Brave/We're no Awa Te Bide Awa"
  - "Green Hills of Tyrol"
  - "The Skye Boat Song"
  - "Flower of Scotland"
  - "The Barren Rocks of Aden/Mary's Wedding"
- "The Globe and Laurel" (To honour the Royal Marines)

=== Original Compositions ===
- Dunsmuir Castle
- March Colonel George Logan – Composed by Cadet Pipe Major Daniel V. Ferguson for the departure parade of the then Commandant Colonel George Logan.

== Activities ==
The Pipes and Drums performed at military parades, public relations trips and recruit shows. The Pipe Section and the Drum Section also performed at mess dinners; parades; sporting events; ceremonies (official or squadron); funerals; wing events; Christmas and Graduation Balls; private events; and holidays. The 50th anniversary year of the RRMC in 1990 was one of the busiest years for the band in terms of the number of activities the band did. The band, augmented by Highland Dancers at the Sunset Ceremony, took an active part in the Sunset Ceremony and Graduation Parade during the 50th Anniversary celebration in 1990.

== Directors ==
The following is a list of Drum Majors of the RRMC Band in order of appointment:

- WO George Dunn (1975-1979)
- PO1 Gavin Bruner (1979-1985)
- PO Tom Vickery (1985-1995)

== See also ==
- Royal Military College of Canada Bands
- British Columbia Regiment Band
- The Band of the 15th Field Regiment, RCA
