= James Gayfer =

Canadian musician, military officer and educator

James McDonald Gayfer
- Born: 26 March 1916; Toronto, Canada
- Died: 7 April 1997 (aged 81); Lindsay, Ontario, Canada
- Education: Royal College of Music, Royal Academy of Music
- Occupations: Musician, composer, educator, military officer
- Awards: Service Medal of the Order of St John

James McDonald Gayfer (26 March 1916 – 7 April 1997) was a Canadian bandmaster, clarinetist, composer, conductor, organist, military officer, and music educator. His compositional output encompasses several orchestral works, including two symphonies, numerous works for band and solo piano, a modest amount of chamber music, and several songs, hymns, and choral works. In 1944 his string quartet won the CPRS award and in 1947 his Six Translations from the Chinese for tenor and small orchestra won the Composers, Authors and Publishers Association of Canada competition. In 1953, he was appointed to the post of Director of Music of the Band of the Canadian Guards, serving until 1961. From then on, he served as a musical training officers of the Canadian Forces School of Music. In 1960 he wrote The Canadian Infantryman, the official march past of the Royal Canadian Infantry Corps. Although Gayfer's works remain unpublished, some of them have been recorded by a number of artists, including Howard Cable, David Mills, and the Edmonton Wind Ensemble. The Band of the Royal 22^{e} Régiment continues to perform his works with some frequency. In 1983 he was awarded the Service Medal of the Order of St John.

== Life ==
Born in Toronto, Gayfer studied at the University of Toronto where he earned a Bachelor of Music in 1941. In 1942 he met Ralph Vaughan Williams and the two men went on to become lifelong friends. He pursued further studies in London where he earned an associates diploma at the Royal College of Music in 1946 and a licentiate from the Royal Academy of Music in 1947. He also attended courses at the Royal Military School of Music from 1945 to 1947. He returned to the University of Toronto, earning a Doctor of Music in 1950. Among his notable teachers were Jennie Goodman Bouck and Reginald Godden (piano), Maitland Farmer (organ), and Ettore Mazzoleni (orchestration), Arthur H. Middleton, and S. Drummond Wolff.

In 1940 Gayfer joined the Canadian Army, ultimately becoming a clarinetist in the band of the Royal Canadian Corps of Signals with whom he was stationed in Europe from 1943 to 1945. He later was appointed command bandmaster and command inspector of bands, a post he held from 1947 to 1951. From 1954 to 1961 he was director of music of the band of The Canadian Guards and from 1961 to 1968 he served as the first musical training officer for the Canadian Forces School of Music. He notably took some of the military bands to Japan and Korea for concerts to entertain troops overseas. He retired from the military in 1966 with the rank of Major.

While serving in the military, Gayfer, also held various church posts in the Ontario area as organist/choirmaster. He was also conductor of the Harmony Symphony Orchestra from 1949 to 1954 and was involved in conducting opera and operetta performances in Toronto from 1962 to 1966. He served as the associate conductor of the Victoria Symphony Orchestra in 1963-1964 and was the leader of the Kitchener Musical Society Band in 1971–1972.

After leaving the Canadian Army, Gayfer joined the teaching staff at Southwood Secondary School in Galt where he taught from 1966 to 1972. In 1967 he founded the Galt Community Choir and Orchestra, serving as the groups conductor through 1970. He also taught music classes at Champlain High School in Pembroke and was a member of the music faculty at Dalhousie University from 1972 to 1974. In 1978 he founded the Petawawa Legion Community Band. He died in Lindsay, Ontario at the age of 81.
