= Canadian Armed Forces Tattoo 1967 =

Traveling military exhibition in Canada in 1967

Canadian Forces Tattoo 1967
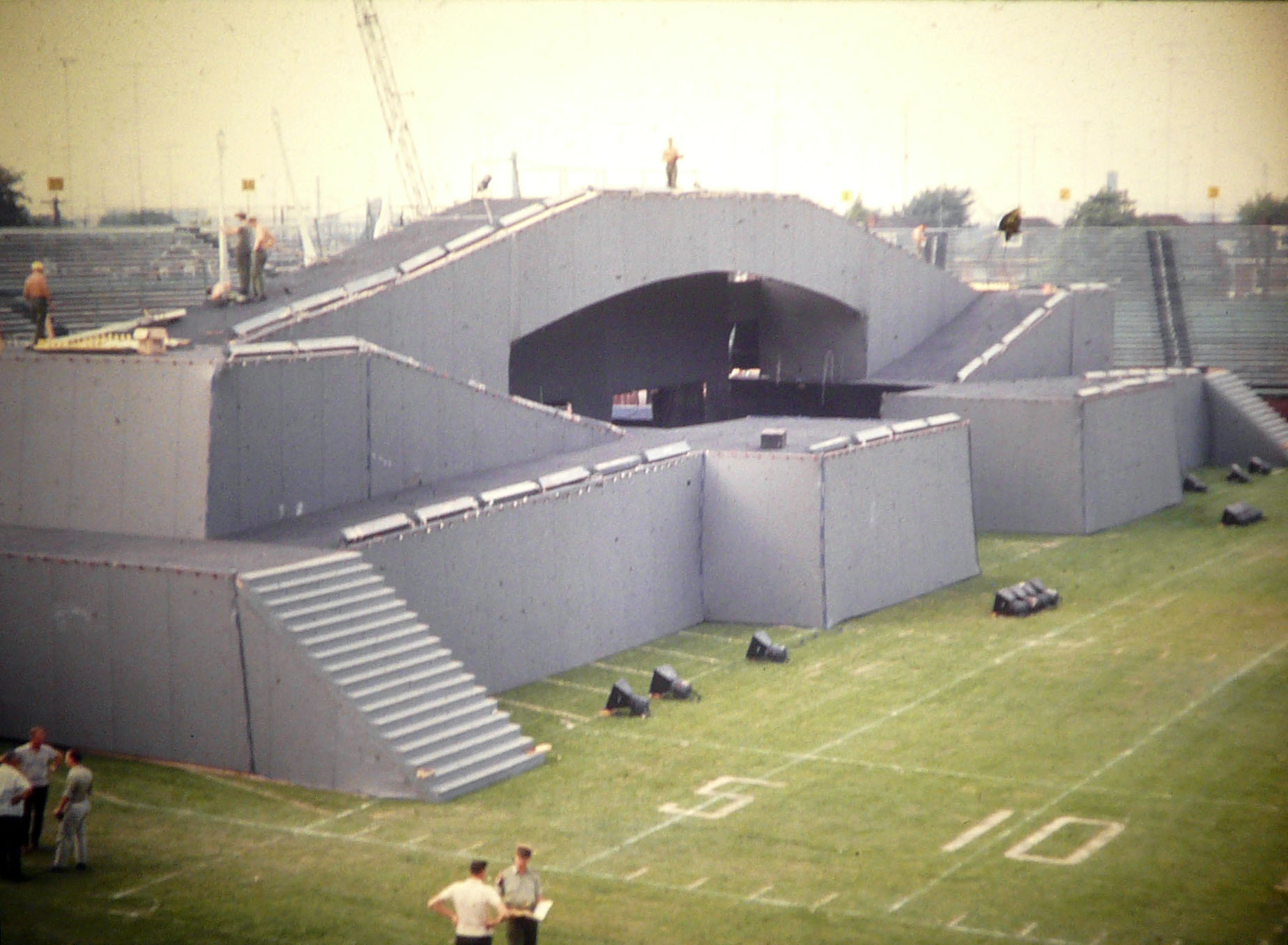
- Fort ready for the show
- Date: March–October 1967
- Location: Canada
- Organised by: Canadian Forces
- Filmed by: Canadian Broadcasting Corporation
- Participants: Canadian military bands

The Canadian Forces Tattoo 1967 was a series of military tattoos or displays performed by members of the Canadian military portraying more than three hundred years of Canada's military history. The Tattoo, which was the Canadian military's contribution to Canada's centennial year celebrations in 1967, toured the country from coast to coast. This was the largest such event in the history of the Canadian military. Samuel Leve was the lighting designer for these shows.

The Tattoo shows started in late March 1967 and ended in October after approximately 150 performances in over 40 cities across Canada. The Tattoo performed in every province in Canada. After several years of planning, rehearsals for the show commenced in late February 1967 at Camp Picton (later CFB Picton) in Ontario. All branches of the military - the Royal Canadian Navy, Canadian Army, and Royal Canadian Air Force - participated.

There were three parts to the Tattoo:

- Between March and May two identical shows, one travelling in a blue train and the other in a red train, each with about 450 men, toured across Canada and performed in arenas.
- The two trains united in Victoria, BC, and were augmented by more military personnel to form a show of 1700 men and women. This second part of the tour played in larger stadiums, for example, Empire Stadium in Vancouver, Autostade at Expo 67 in Montreal and the CNE Stadium in Toronto, then Ottawa and finally in Hamilton, Ontario. Hamilton was the last stadium show.
- Following the Hamilton stadium show, a troupe similar in size to the train shows toured the Maritimes in the late summer and early fall of 1967. The tattoo has never been repeated.

Upon the completion of the last show on October 11, 1967, all the hundreds of uniforms, costumes, muskets, swords, etc. were put into storage and over the years have been sold off to museums and private collectors.

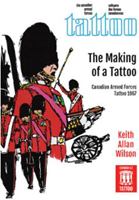
Front Cover

A history of Tattoo 1967 has been published at the end of October 2017 by FriesenPress called the Making of a Tattoo. The book follows the development of the Tattoo from the earliest stages in 1963 to the end when the Tattoo played its last performance in October, 1967. The Tattoo was a major theatrical production that was seen by millions of Canadians and was televised on two occasions by the Canadian Broadcasting Company. The tattoo has today become a once-in-a-lifetime event that was never conceived after its ending.

== Notable participants ==
790 musicians from the following 17 army, navy, and air force bands took part in the tattoo:

- Naden Band of Maritime Forces Pacific
- Stadacona Band of Maritime Forces Atlantic
- CFB Cornwallis Band
- Royal Canadian Horse Artillery Band
- Royal Canadian Artillery Band
- La Musique du Royal 22^{e} Régiment
- Princess Patricia's Canadian Light Infantry Band
- Central Band of the Canadian Armed Forces
- Air Training Command Band
- Royal Canadian Dragoons Band
- Band of the Royal Canadian Corps of Signals
- Band of the Royal Canadian Engineers
- Band of Lord Strathcona's Horse
- The Black Watch (Royal Highland Regiment) of Canada Pipes and Drums
- Royal Canadian Ordnance Corps Band
- Band of the Canadian Guards
- Band of the Royal Canadian Regiment
