= Band of The Royal Regiment of Canada =

Canadian military band

The Band of The Royal Regiment of Canada
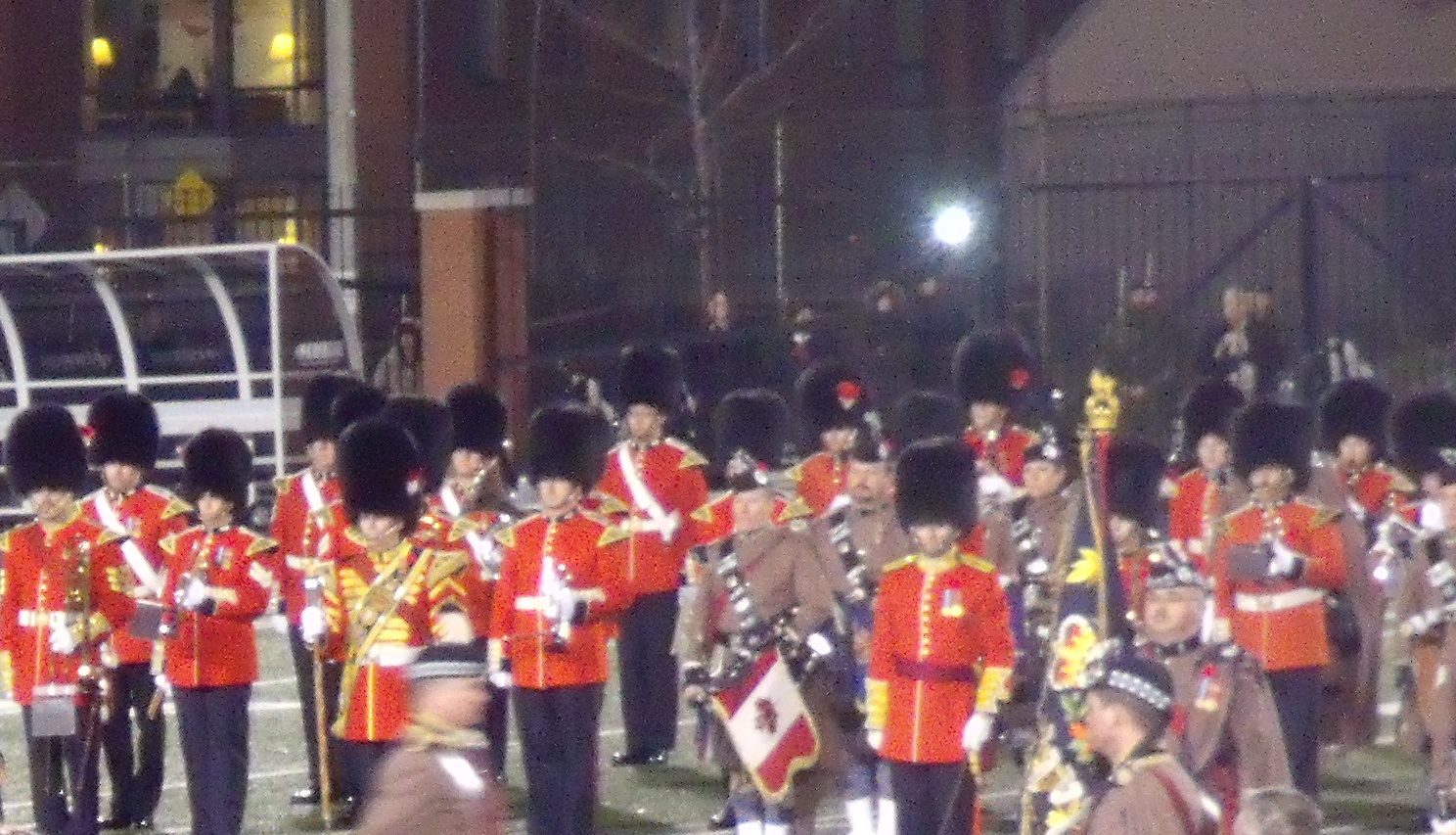
- Active: 1863-Present
- Country: Canada
- Branch: Canadian Army
- Type: Military band
- Size: 35 members
- Part of: 32 Canadian Brigade Group
- Garrison/HQ: Fort York Armoury, Toronto
- Website: http://band.rregtc.ca/

Commanders
- Director of Music: Lieutenant Gregory Yasinsky
- Drum Major: Sergeant Steven Yasinsky
- Band Sergeant Major: Warrant Officer Sheila Andrews, CD

The Band of The Royal Regiment of Canada is a Canadian military band that serves as the official regimental band of the Royal Regiment of Canada. It is the oldest permanently organised band in the Canadian Forces. It is based at Fort York in Toronto and is assigned to the part of 4th Canadian Division's 32 Canadian Brigade Group. The ceremonial dress uniform of the band is that of the former Canadian Guards regiment, a scarlet tunic and bearskin with a red-over-white plume.

== History ==
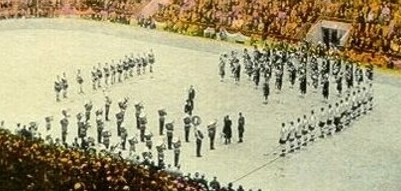
The Band of the Royal Grenadiers on a postcard during the opening night ceremony of Maple Leaf Gardens.

The band was established in 1863, just one year after its home regiment was established as the Royal Grenadiers. It was originally composed of members of the Toronto-based volunteer militia band. The band received its first set of drums and instruments that same year. Due to its lineage, it was therefore referred to as the Band of the 10th Battalion Royal Grenadiers from 1881-1900 and later as the Band of the Royal Grenadiers from 1920-36. It assumed the name by which it continues to be known as in 1991.

On 1 July 1867, the band presented a formal concert in Queen's Park, Toronto, in celebration of Confederation of Canada. Under Lieutenant Walter M. Murdoch's leadership, the band was increased to 60. The band played at Massey Hall throughout the 1930s, first at the opening ceremony of Maple Leaf Gardens in 1933 and then for the 100th anniversary of Toronto's incorporation in 1934. It also took part in the reception for King George VI during his 1939 royal tour of Canada and has played for every reigning monarch from Queen Victoria to Elizabeth II throughout its history.

== Directors ==
- Captain John Waldron (February 1888-)
- Warrant-Officer Harold Bromley (until 1926)
- Lieutenant Walter M. Murdoch (1926-1958)
- Captain Stanley H. Clark (1958-1968)
- Captain E.J. Robbins (1968-1972)
- Major Gino A. Falconi (1972-2000)
- Captain William Mighton (2000-2014)
- Captain Kevin Anderson (2014–2023)
- Lieutenant Gregory Yasinsky (2023–present)

== Structure ==
- Headquarters
- Parade Band
- Concert Band
- Dance Band
- Big Band
- Fanfare Trumpeters

=== Headquarters ===
- Director of Music - Lieutenant Gregory Yasinsky
- Drum Major - Sergeant Steven Yasinsky
- Band Sergeant Major - Warrant Officer Sheila Andrews, CD

=== Parade Band ===
The parade band is the marching contingent from the band that participates in parade public activities in Toronto.

== Notable performances ==
British Grenadiers & Here's to the Maiden
The regimental quick march of the Royal Regiment of Canada as performed by the band in 1996

- Protocol
  - Performances for the Royal Family
  - State visits
  - Presentation of Colours
- Mixed performances
  - Military Musical Pageant at Wembley Stadium
  - 50th anniversary of the raid on Dieppe in August 1942
  - The launching of the ship the Hector in Pictou, Nova Scotia
  - The Summerside Tattoo in Prince Edward Island
  - 2000 International Military Festival of Music in Quebec City
  - 16th International Military Band Festival in Kraków, Poland
  - Stone Mountain Highland Games Military Tattoo in Atlanta, Georgia
  - Ticonderoga Tattoo
  - Rochester International Marine Tattoo in New York (state)
  - TRADOC Military Tattoo in Fort Monroe, Virginia
  - 1967 Ontario centenary celebrations
  - Performing in Philadelphia with the RCMP's Musical Ride, as part of the US Bicentennial festivities.
  - Performance at Meaford Hall in Meaford, Ontario commemorating the role of the Regiment in the Liberation of Holland.

== Discography ==
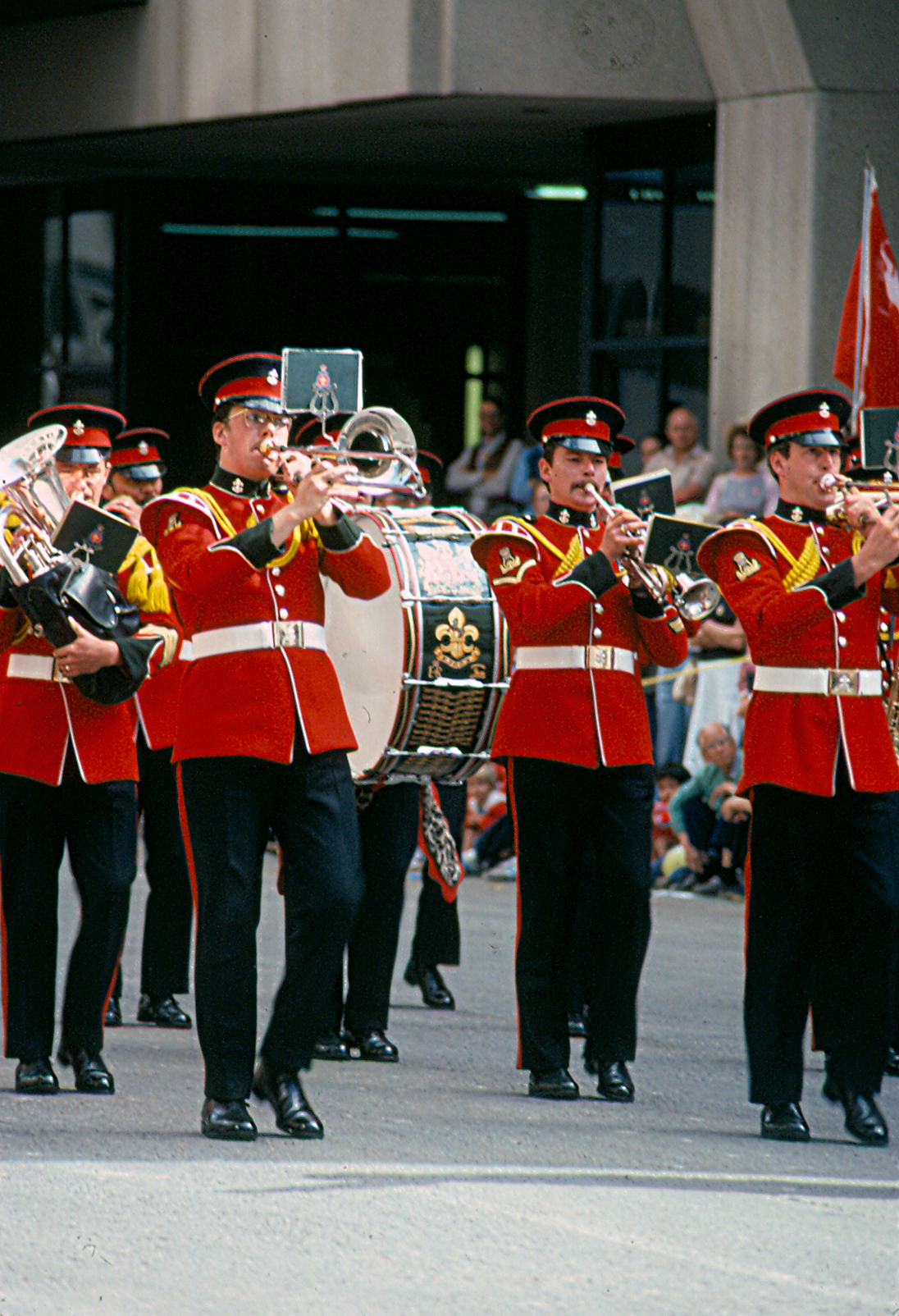
The band at the Calgary Stampede in 1982.

The band has made seven compact disc recordings:

- Ready Aye Ready
- In Concert, On Parade
- Footsteps in Time
- Fields of Honour
- Promenade
- Saeculum Aureum
- Freedom of the City
