= King's Own Calgary Regiment Band =

Canadian military band

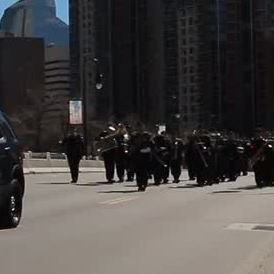
- The band at the Vimy Ridge Day Parade in Calgary, 8 April 2017.
- Active: 1910–Present
- Country: Canada
- Branch: Canadian Army
- Type: Military band
- Size: 35 members
- Headquarters: Mewata Armoury, Calgary
- Nickname: KOCR Band
- Website: http://kocrband.ca/

Commanders
- Director of Music: Lieutenant Holly De Caigny
- Notable commanders: Captain Hugh MacPherson

The King's Own Calgary Regiment Band is the regimental band of The King's Own Calgary Regiment based at Mewata Armouries in Calgary, Alberta. It is currently one of two Primary Reserve bands in 41 Canadian Brigade Group and is the de facto military bands for the southern Alberta area. The regimental band is an composed of volunteer members, all of whom have completed the Basic Military Qualification (BMQ) and many of whom have studied and trained at the Canadian Forces School of Music at CFB Borden.

The band has the following ensembles:

- Wind Ensemble
- Brass Ensemble
  - Fanfare Team
- Percussion Ensemble

== History ==
The KOCR traces its history to 1910 and the establishment of the 103rd Regiment (Calgary Rifles), which was part of the Non-Permanent Active Militia. The 103rd had a musical band as well as a bugle band. These originally consisted of members of the Calgary Fire Department and the Calgary Citizens Band. Following the outbreak of the First World War, many musicians of the 103rd volunteered for service with 50th Battalion of the Canadian Expeditionary Force, where they continued to serve as musicians, as well as medical personnel, stretcher bearers and stick orderlies.

The Calgary Regiment was created in 1920 as a reorganization of the 103rd. The regiment mobilized a tank regiment in the 2nd World War. Unlike its service in the first war, the band did not deploy with the Calgary Regiment to Europe during the Second World War.

After the Second World War, the regiment was granted the King's Own prefix to its title. The regimental band gained new members in 1963 with the official disbandment of the Band of the Calgary unit of the Royal Canadian Army Service Corps that year. In 1966, the band, then under the direction of Victor Wright, was dissolved by order of the Department of National Defense. It was reinstated in the early 1970s and was given its own Unit Identification Code, making it a separate unit of the Canadian Forces, distinct from the KOCR regiment.

A decade later, the band stirred controversy when it performed its regimental march, Colonel Bogey March, during the visit of the Prime Minister of Japan Masayoshi Ōhira to Ottawa in May 1980, which was perceived as an insult as it was used in the movie The Bridge on the River Kwai, which depicted prisoners of war held under inhumane conditions by the Japanese. In June 1991, the band took part in the funeral of the John Michael Pierce, a British oil developer who died at a ranch in Turner Valley. In 1992, the band released its first and as of 2020, only album titled: A Salute To Canada's War Veterans On Canada's 125th Anniversary 1992. In May 2005, the band performed martial music at the Scotiabank Saddledome for Queen Elizabeth II during her visit to Calgary.

== Modern day activities ==
The KOCR Band participates several activities:

- Military parade
- Regimental Dinners
- Concerts
- Regimental Holidays
- Presentation of Colours
- Funerals (state and regimental)

The 35-member band primarily performs as a concert and parade band and performs at military and provincial functions in the community. Besides musicians, members of the band are also trained as mechanics, as well as infantry soldiers. Being based in Calgary, it has performed in the city's many activities, including the Calgary Stampede and the St. George's Day parade. It also performs during events that are held on the national scale, such as Remembrance Day services and Canada Day parades. Local sporting events are often in its schedule, including games with the Calgary Flames and the Edmonton Oilers.

== See also ==
- Royal Canadian Artillery Band
- Princess Patricia's Canadian Light Infantry Band
- Regimental Pipes and Drums of The Calgary Highlanders
- 4 Wing Band
