= British Columbia Regiment Band =

Military band

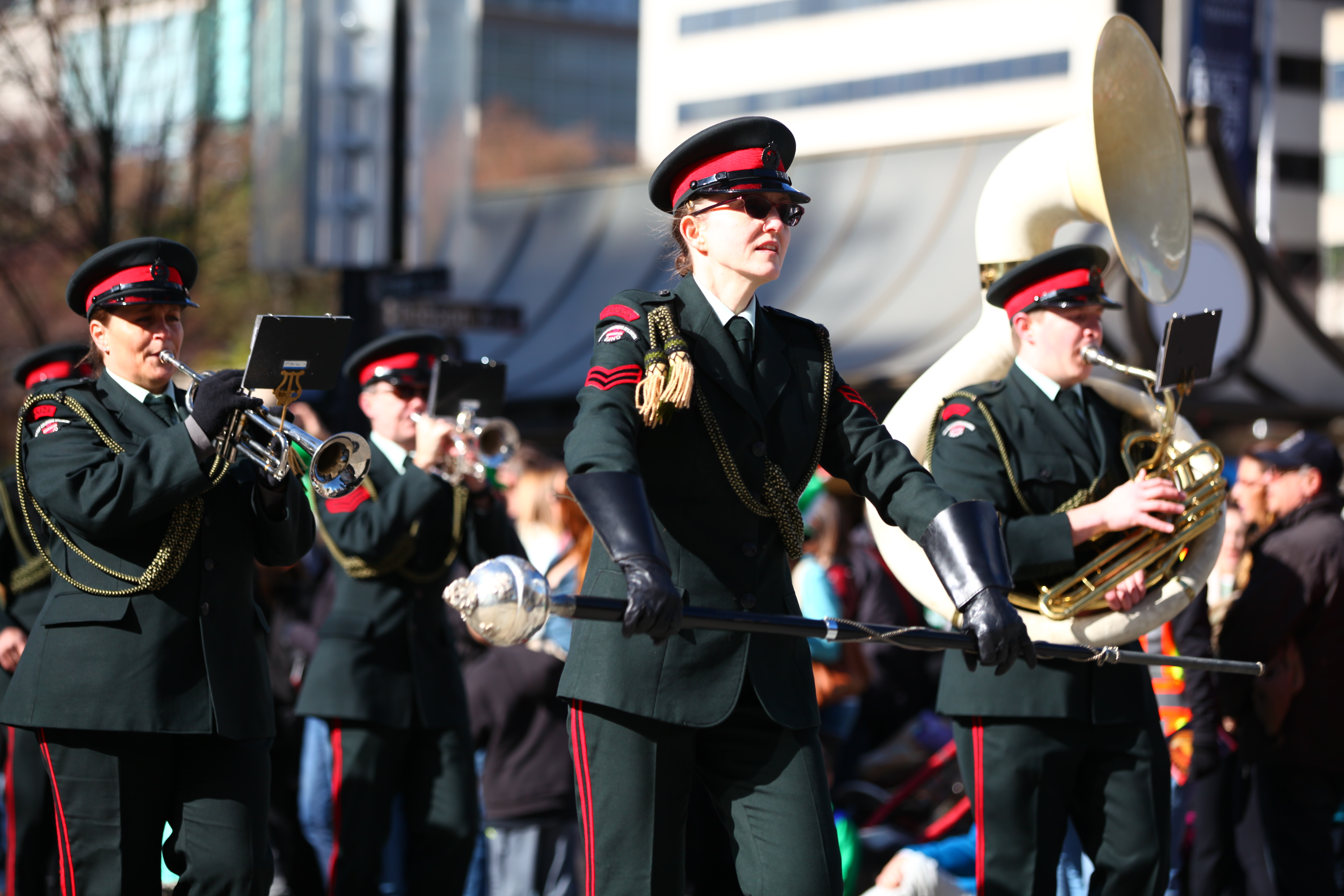
The band in the Vancouver St Patrick's Day Parade, 18 March 2013.

The British Columbia Regiment Band is one of many Canadian military bands in the Canadian province of British Columbia, serving as the official that serves as the official regimental band of The British Columbia Regiment (Duke of Connaught's Own), based out of Beatty Street Drill Hall in Vancouver. It is a voluntary band, which means that its band members are not composed of full-time professional musicians. The band currently provides musical support for the community in the Greater Vancouver metropolitan area.

The band often takes part in the following events:

- Kerrisdale Parade
- North Thompson Fall Fair and Rodeo
- Remembrance Day
- Performances for the Royal Family
- Presentation of Colours
- Remembrance Day
- Sun Run
- Apeldoorn Veterans Parade
- Government House (Victoria) Open House

== History ==
The first authorized regimental band was formed on 9 November 1883, one month after the establishment of the regiment. The band evolved into a drum and bugle corps in 1900 after the regiment's designation as a rifle regiment from artillery. During, the First World War, members of the unit were deployed to Europe while the drums sat with the colours in the Regimental Museum. In the immediate decade after the Second World War, the band became very well known and won many band competitions. With the 1968 Unification of the Canadian Armed Forces by the Department of National Defence under the auspices of minister Léo Cadieux and the Government of Pierre Trudeau, the band was disbanded and its members were absorbed into the regiment. 20 years later in 1987, Major Jim Barrett, a former band officer, began efforts to revive the band with permission from the committee of retired colonels which he obtained that year. Warrant Officer Claire Archer became the band's first Director of Music, Over the following ten years under Ron's leadership the Band grew to 40-50 members, eventually having the means to write a constitution in 2003.

== Characteristics ==
The band has the following characteristics:

=== Uniform ===
The following is the general layout of the band's uniform:

Full dress headgear	Tunic	Trousers
Black beret	Green tunic (Rifle Green), black facings, yellow heavy-cavalry knot/Blue jacket, shoulder chain mail	Blue trousers, yellow stripe

A feature of the jacket a traditional Mandarin collar, which is derived from in Qing-era China. The headdress comprises a Rifle Green forage cap and a red capband. The silver cap badge is that of the British Columbia Regiment. For summer dress, a uniform similar to Service Dress Number 3B (short sleeved shirt with black-on-red epaulet slip-on) is used

=== Structure ===
- Ceremonial Band
- Concert Band
- Dance Band
- Big Band
- Fanfare Team
- Bugle Team

The bugle team was recently revived to promote tradition in the regiment. A lot of the buglers were part of the British Columbia Regiment Association Band. The team is led by a bugle major who leads the team as a separate formation.

=== Pipes and Drums ===
In June 2002, the Irish Fusiliers of Canada and the British Columbia Regiment were formally merged to preserve the Battle Honours and name of the Irish Fusiliers. As a result, the BCR Irish Pipes and Drums has been attached to the band as well. The 28-member pipe band rehearses at Templeton High School in East Vancouver and at Legion #179 Commercial Drive Leigon.

== Sources ==
- Official Website
- BC Regiment Band - Disco Lives
- Louisa Phung conducts the BC Regiment Band
- The BC Regiment Band at the Pacific National Exhibition, 27 August 2017
