= RCAF Overseas Headquarters Band =

The RCAF Overseas Headquarters Band was a Royal Canadian Air Force military ensemble. It performed primarily in the United Kingdom during the Second World War as part of RCAF Overseas. It was founded in 1942, two years after the establishment of the headquarters. Its arrival in England was followed by that of the No. 6 Bomber Group Band and the Bournemouth Band. For most of its existence, it was led by Squadron Leader Martin Boundy. Boundy would later become the President of the Canadian Band Association in 1951 and 1970.

During its existence, it performed 55 concerts on the BBC and has also recorded for His Master's Voice as well as the Overseas Recorded Broadcasting Service. Notable performances have included one in front of Buckingham Palace in 1944 and a six-week European tour following the Victory in Europe Day. Two days after Canada Day in 1945, Boundy conducted a massed band from the band and the No. 3 Squadron Band in London's Lincoln's Inn Fields.

== The Streamliners ==
The Streamliners was the band's 15-piece small dance band. It performed at the BBC as well as alternated with the United States Army Air Corps Band led by Glenn Miller and The Squadronaires of the Royal Air Force at the Queensbury Club (now the Prince Edward Theatre) in London. It is often referred to as "The Band of Brothers". In June 1944, the band was temporarily stationed in France to provide musical support to the allied troops participating in Normandy landings. In late 1945, it underwent a tour of Germany. The band members played at more than 600 gigs throughout the UK, France, Belgium, the Netherlands, Germany, and Denmark. In its travels, the band used a special use Dakota C3 aircraft. It was notably led by Patrick Riccio. It also included British citizens such as Jack Fallon, who was an accomplished violinist.

In October 2024, Goderich Little Theatre in Goderich, Ontario, premiered a play titled The Streamliners, written by Andy Sparling and James White, produced and directed by Duncan McGregor, at The Livery, a 140-seat theatre in the heart of town. Andy Sparling is the son of Phil Sparling (1922–2010), who was a reeds player with the RCAF Streamliners. The program for the Goderich production listed the following as members of the RCAF Streamliners: Music director/arranger: Pat Riccio from Toronto, Ontario (reeds); conductor: Billy Carter from Goderich, Ontario (trumpet); Phil Sparling from Clinton, Ontario, but born in Goderich, Ontario (reeds); Jack "Jake" Perdue from Clinton, Ontario (reeds); Fraser Lobban from Owen Sound, Ontario (trumpet); Claude Lambert from Wyoming, Ontario (trumpet); Jack Fallon from London, Ontario (bass); Frank Palen from Woodstock, Ontario (reeds); George Lane from Windsor, Ontario (vocalist); Bill Bebbington from St. Thomas, Ontario (trombone); Lyle Kohler from Ottawa, Ontario (piano); Bob Burns from Toronto, Ontario (reeds); Len Coppold from Montréal, Quebec (guitar); and M.O. (Mel) Smith from Laing, Saskatchewan (trombone).

== See also ==
- United States Air Forces in Europe Band
- Band of the Duke of Edinburgh's Royal Regiment
- Australian Army Band Corps
