= Band of the Royal Canadian Corps of Signals =

The Band of the Royal Canadian Corps of Signals was a regimental military band in Canada based out of Canadian Forces Base Kingston in Ontario. It is a voluntary band, which means that its band members are not composed of full-time professional musicians. The band provided musical support for the community in the Kingston, Ontario metropolitan area as well as Ottawa–Gatineau.

Outside of this band, the RCCS maintained multiple units bands, including the 2nd Division Trumpet Band, the 8th Division Trumpet Band and the Apprentice School Trumpet Band.

== History ==
In the early 40s, a bugle band was attached to the RCCS and went with the unit during its tour of duty in Europe. The RCCS also maintained bugle bands in its 2nd Division, 8th Division Trumpet Band and Apprentice School. On 1 March 1950, officers of the RCCS were presented a drum major's ceremonial mace and sash for use by the regimental trumpet band that predated the brass and reed band. The mace and sash were stored at Vimy Barracks until required for use by the band, which at the time consisted staff members of a base training establishment. The band was created in January 1952 as the regimental band of the Royal Canadian Corps of Signals. A year after its creation, it was designated as the sole band to perform public duties and state functions in the National Capital Region, a similar role to the Central Band of the Canadian Armed Forces today. Due to its proximity to the Royal Military College of Canada, the band often performed at ceremonies the occur at the RMC (examples including the RMC-West Point hockey game, graduation parades and the Tattoo Ceremony), often in a more senior role compared to the Bands of the RMC. In the latter part of the decades, it was assigned to Canadian Forces Europe, in which it provided support to the regimental contingent at Canadian Forces Base Lahr. The last major event the band took part in was the Canadian Armed Forces Tattoo 1967 for Canada's centennial celebrations that year. During the tattoo, during which it was under the direction of Captain K. Swanwick, the band notably played Vive la Canadienne during the march off, which prompted cheers of "Vive de Gaulle" in the audience. This was considered to be the public's response to the French President's closing phrase Vive le Québec libre during a rally on 24 July. In October 1968, as a result of the Unification of the Canadian Armed Forces earlier in the year, the band was merged with the Royal Canadian Dragoons Band to become the Band of CFB Kingston. Also known as the Vimy Army Band, it served as part of the successor organization of the RCCS, the Communications and Electronics Branch. In the 1970s the case the mace and sash were contained was moved to the Communications and Electronics Museum where they remained on display. In 1986, the tradition was reinstated for the Vimy Band and in 1987, a new drum major's sash was created, going into use until the band was disbanded in 1994.

== Notable members ==
- Charles Adams – Director of Music of the Band of the Canadian Guards from 1966 to 1968
- Jack Kopstein – Assistant director of the Central Band of the Canadian Armed Forces from 1979 to 1981
- Michael Savich – The longest serving member of the Naden Band of Maritime Forces Pacific
- Brian Williams
- Jack Kane – An Anglo-Canadian arranger, conductor and clarinetist
- James Gayfer – Director of the Band of The Canadian Guards in the 1950s and early 60s.
- Sylvain Gagnon – Former director of Band of the Royal Military College of Canada and the current director of the C&E Band.
