= Canadian Forces School of Music =

Music school of the Canadian Armed Forces

The Canadian Forces School of Music, CFSMus (French: École de musique des Forces canadiennes, EMFC) was an educational institution that supported the music branch and all Canadian military bands in the Canadian Forces. It was created in 1954 in Esquimalt, British Columbia for musicians of the Royal Canadian Navy, with the school being the Canadian equivalent of the United States Armed Forces School of Music and the Royal Military School of Music. In 1961, the school was expanded and rebranded to include musicians from the Canadian Army and the Royal Canadian Air Force, and by the time of the Unification of the Canadian Armed Forces in February 1968, the school had officially been renamed CFSMus. In 1987, CFSMus was re-located to CFB Borden in Ontario and provided two years of training to the Regular Force until it was disestablished in 1994. Musical training continued for the Primary Reserve of the CF, under the umbrella of the Canadian Forces School of Administration and Logistics (CFSAL) and later the Canadian Forces Logistics and Training Centre (CFLTC). Enrollment varied with the requirement for musicians. The school also trained CF musicians with experience in the music branch who wished to serve in leadership positions in CF bands. Personnel of the Regular Force who wished to be qualified to as a pipe major attended a year-long course at CFSMus in order be appointed to the post. The Music Training Center (MTC) under CFLTC falls under the Canadian Forces Training Development Centre (CFTDC), as of September 4, 2026.

Notable instructors at CFSMus included Major James Gayfer who was the director of the Band of the Canadian Guards from 1953 to 1961.

== Commandants ==
The following have served as commandants of the school:

- Lieutenant Commander H.G. Cuthbert (1954–1956)
- Lieutenant Commander Stanley Sunderland (1956–1966)
- Lieutenant Colonel Clifford Hunt (1966–1968)
- Lieutenant Colonel Edmund T. Jones (1968–1975)
- Lieutenant Colonel Tom Milner (1975–1980)
- Lieutenant Colonel Charles-Auguste Villeneuve (1980–1984)
- Commander George Morrison (1984–1985)
- Lieutenant Commander Ben Templaars (1985–1987)
- Major Jean-Pierre Montminy (1987–1990)
- Major William T. Wornes (1990-)
- Major John French ( until disbanding in 1994)

== Notable alumni ==
- Jack Kopstein, graduated in 1971 and went on to later serve as assistant director of the Central Band of the Canadian Armed Forces.
- Kenneth Killingbeck, director of the Royal Canadian Regiment Band in the late 1980s and early 1990s.
- Bobby Herriot, Scottish-Canadian musicians who served in the Band of the Blues and Royals and The Band of the 7th Toronto Regiment, RCA.

== See also ==
- Canadian military bands
- Music Branch (Canadian Forces)
- Authorized marches of the Canadian Armed Forces
- Military band
