= Band of the Ceremonial Guard =

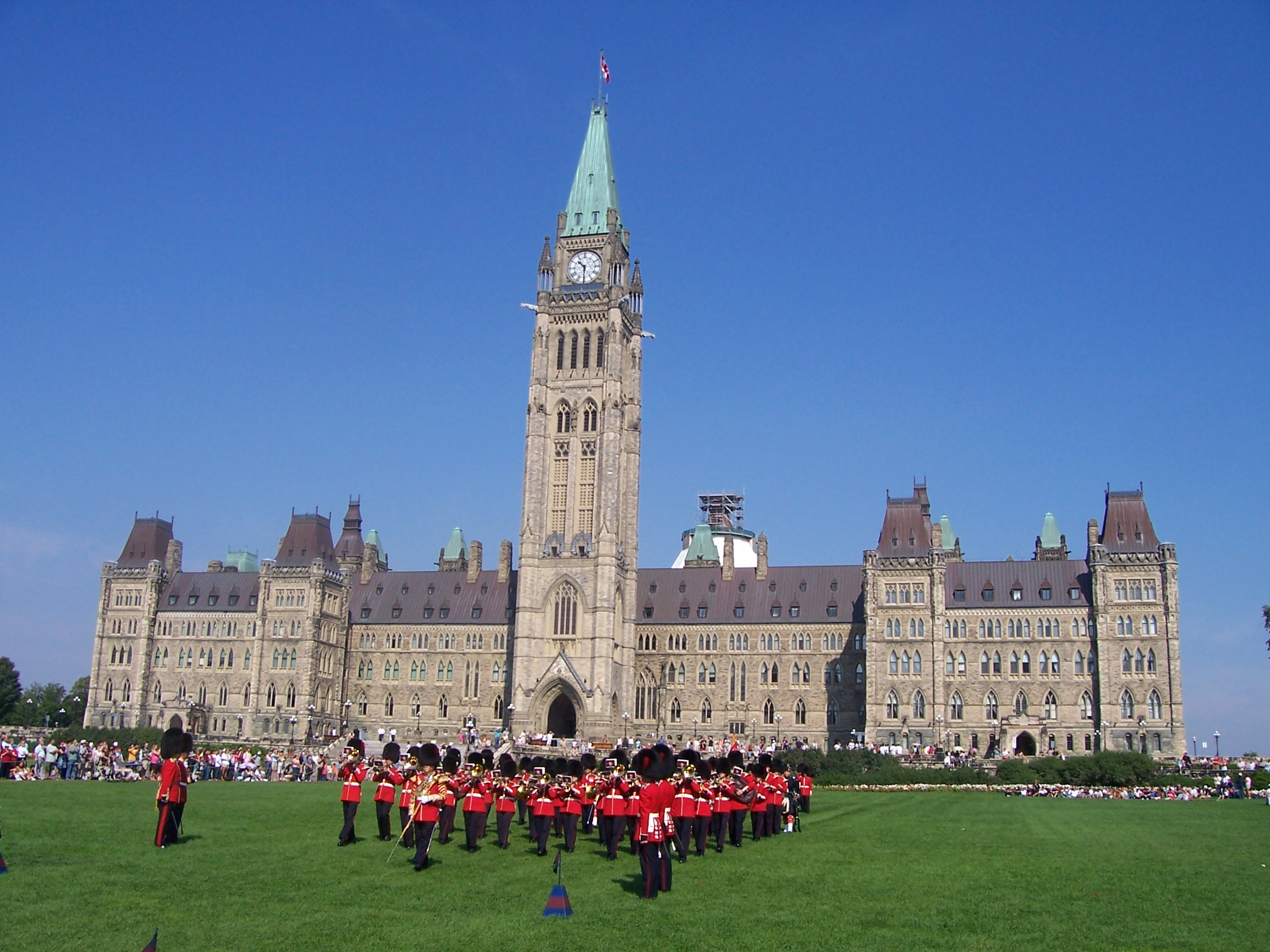
The Band of the Ceremonial Guard in August 2005.

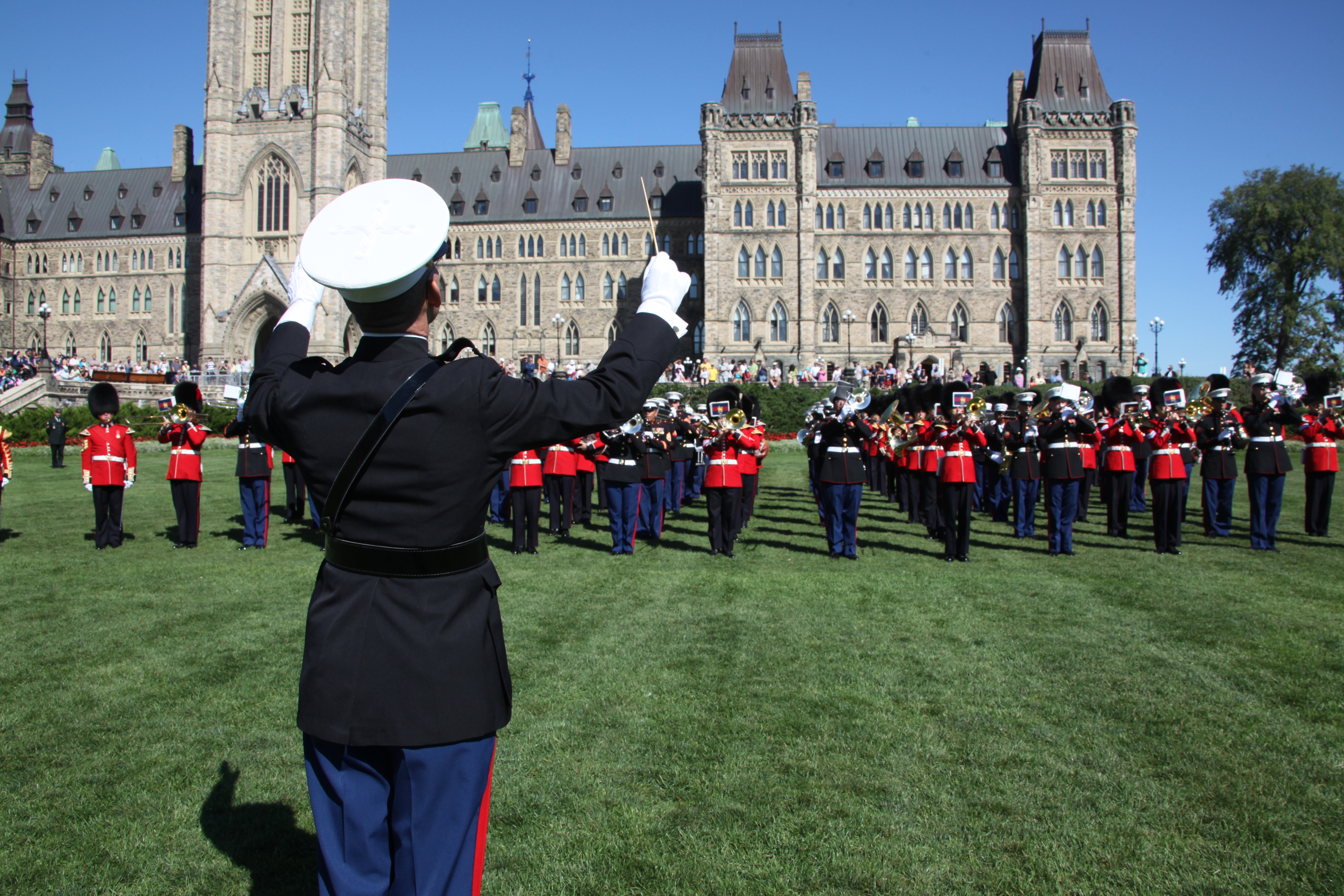
The 2nd Marine Aircraft Wing Band with members of the Band of the Ceremonial Guard at the Fortissimo Sunset Ceremony.

The Band of the Ceremonial Guard (La Musique de la Garde de cérémonie) is an ad hoc military band that is attached to the Canadian Forces Ceremonial Guard in Ottawa. All members of the band are fully trained members of the Canadian Armed Forces (CAF) and consist of personnel principally from two Foot Guard regiments (the Governor General's Foot Guards from Ottawa and the Canadian Grenadier Guards from Montreal). Since 2007, the band has been composed of a pan–Canadian Force that is inclusive to musicians from the Royal Canadian Navy, Canadian Army and Royal Canadian Air Force. The band forms a separate company within the CG and relies on the Headquarters Company for administration and support personnel. In full composition, the band is active from April to August.

== Overview ==
The band came out of the disestablishment of the Band of the Canadian Guards, which served as the Ceremonial band of the Household Troops of Canada in the 50s and 60s. Officially, it was established in 1981 to be assigned with the Public Duties Detachment. The band also maintains its own 85-member brass and reed band and 22 member pipes and drums.

=== Functions ===
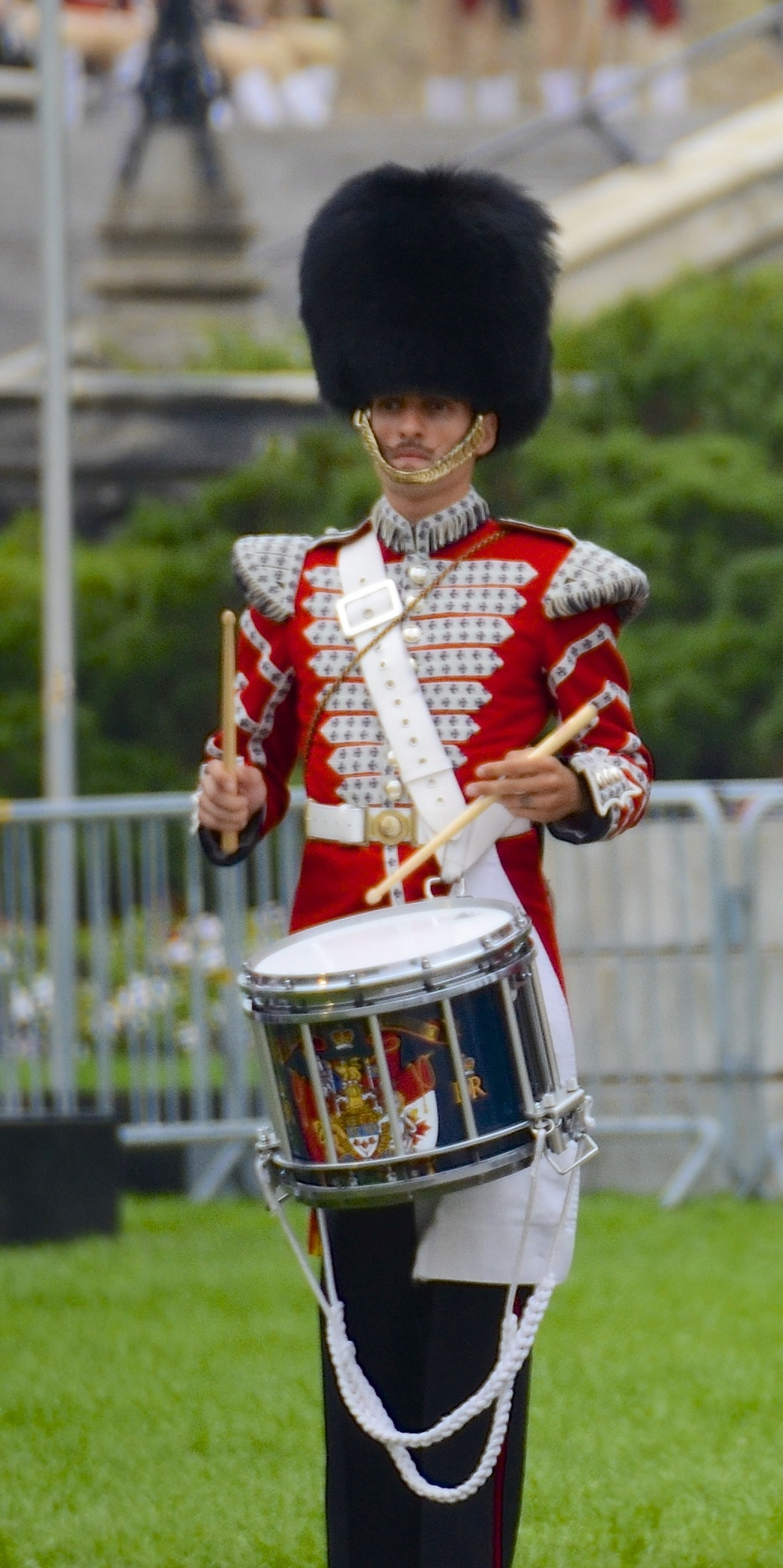
A drummer of the band in full dress uniform.

The Ceremonial Guard primary area of responsibility is located in the capital city of Ottawa as well as the entire National Capital Region. The band's many engagements usually consist of events that revolve around public duties. It has participated in state and military funerals, most recently during Jack Layton's procession at Parliament and going back as early as Prime Minister John Diefenbaker's state funeral. It has also taken part in the state visits as well as royal visits to the nation. In 2010 and 2011 respectively, the band took part in the arrival honors for Queen Elizabeth II and the Duke and Duchess of Cambridge during the Canada Day Noon Show, performing the Vice Regal Salute in the latter's case and God Save the Queen for the former. Each year, the band performs on the morning of Canada Day. Concerts are also given by the band, including live performances such as one at the Embassy of the United States of America in Ottawa in July 2019. It also takes part in change of command ceremonies for the army and tri-service institutions.

=== Special events ===
Every summer, the Band of the Ceremonial Guard performs during the Changing the Guard ceremony on Parliament Hill. At the beginning of each season, the band performs the music and is inspected by the Governor General of Canada during the annual Governor General's review of the Ceremonial Guard at Rideau Hall, the vice regal residence. Since 1997, band has been responsible for the organization of the "Fortissimo" Sunset Ceremony in late July on Parliament Hill. This ceremony is a combination of the original tradition of the Beating Retreat in the United Kingdom, as well as a military tattoo and the standard lowering of the Canadian flag. The Guard's final parade and the traditional Trooping the Colour on Victoria Day are the main military parades the band has taken part in.

On July 1, 2018, the Band of the Ceremonial Guard performed during its daily guard mounting ceremony on Parliament Hill, a Ukrainian military march known as "Shchob shabli ne braly, shchob Kuli mynaly" (Щоб шаблі не брали, щоб кулі минали) in front of members of the Ukrainian diaspora during the ceremony, as a sort of response to Operation Unifier.

=== Uniforms ===
The band's uses the No. 1 (Ceremonial) Dress, which for the CG consists of the two regimental scarlet tunics provided to them, The uniforms have buttons in pairs or in by themselves depending on the regiment. If the member is with the GGFG, they wear a red plume worn on the left side of the bearskin. If they are with the CGG, they wear a white plume. The bandsmen also wear midnight blue trousers with a 0.6 centimetres (0.24 in) scarlet trouser stripe. Insignia worn with the No.1 Dress depend on the service affiliation of the bandsman, mirroring the Guard's current composition.

=== Recruiting ===
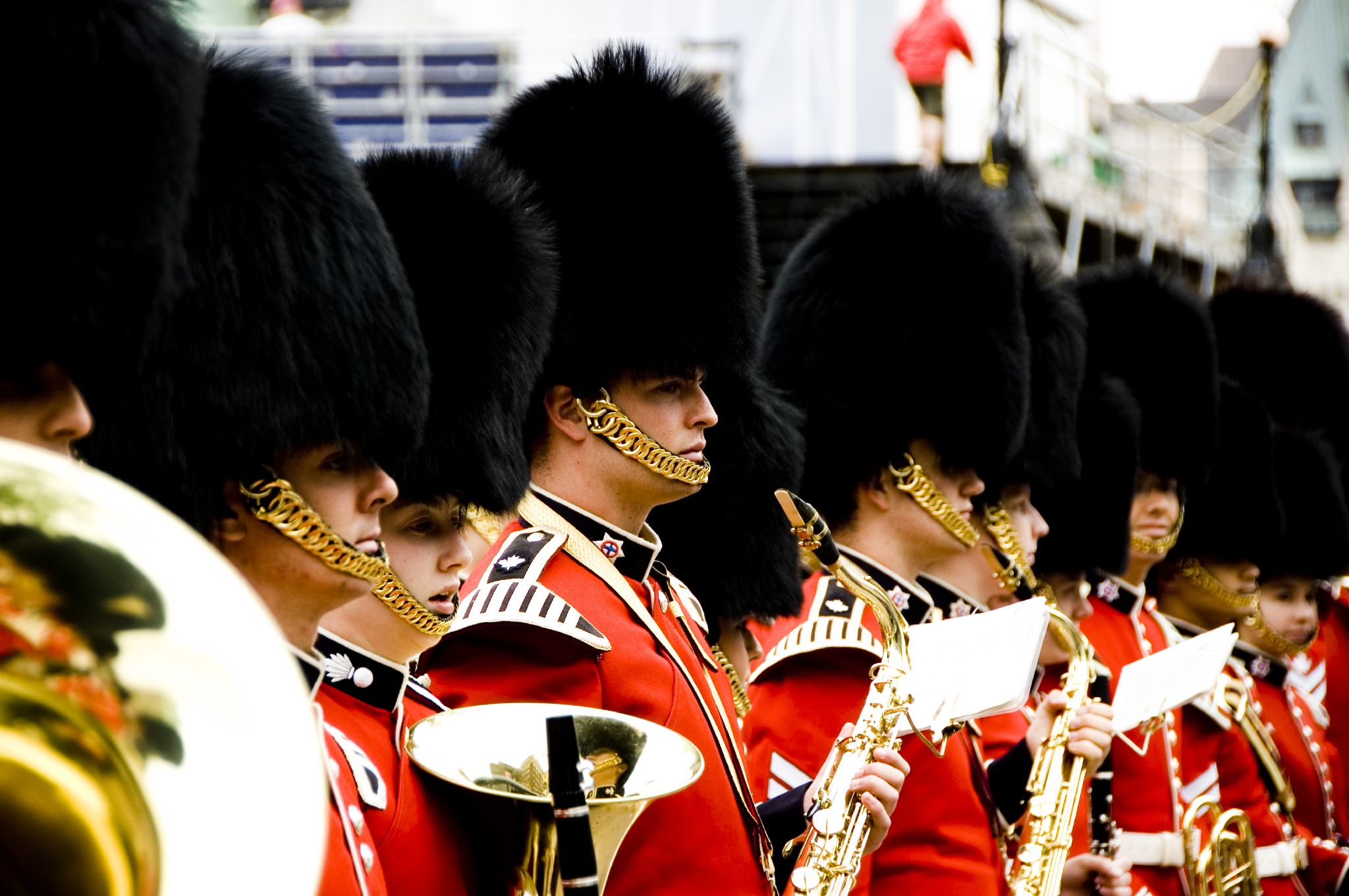
Members of the band on Canada Day in 2007.

The band will primarily take musicians who currently serve with the GGFG and the CGG. When recruiting from the GGFG, it often takes musicians who are part of the regimental band, which effectively serves as the band of the Foot Guards in the Canadian Household Division. Musicians are also drawn from military units of the Primary Reserve, as well as civilian colleges or universities across Canada. Regiments that are represented in the band include the Prince Edward Island Regiment and the Royal Hamilton Light Infantry. All applicants must first pass an audition to be considered while all new musicians must pass the Canadian Armed Forces Basic Military Qualification Course (BMQ) before they can be employed with the Ceremonial Guard.

=== Pipes and Drums ===
The band uniquely performs with the pipes simultaneously during tattoos and augment the band during parades through Ottawa. Members parade primarily with bagpipes, complemented with snare drums, bass drums, and Scottish tenor drums. 10-12 pipers are currently attached to the band, which was established in 1992 with a decision to augment the three pipers hired each year to pipe the Guards down the driveway at Rideau Hall. The band is led by a senior piper who is appointed as Pipe Major for the summer season. Prior to 1996, the Pipes and drums wore the uniform of their parent unit. The Government Tartan (also known as the Black Watch Tartan) was used as the official pattern for the kilts. Its official motto is Ithibh an T-Arbhar As Mo Squadal.

== Signature marches ==
=== 10 Provinces March ===
10 Provinces March is an arrangement of folk tunes composed by Howard Cable (1920–2016). It was first composed in 1986 as a result of a special commission by the government for the changing of the guard ceremony. It is played immediately as the new guard and the band arrives on the hill at 10 a.m. The piece includes the melodies of 10 provincial songs such that include the following:

- Newfoundland: "The Ryans and the Pittmans"
- Prince Edward Island: "Anne of Green Gables"
- Nova Scotia: "Farewell to Nova Scotia"
- New Brunswick: "Peter Emberly"
- Quebec: "Bonhomme, Bonhomme / Cadet Rousselle"
- Ontario: "Maple Leaf Forever"
- Manitoba: "Red River Valley"
- Saskatchewan: "Saskatchewan Hymn"
- Alberta: "Alberta Bound"
- British Columbia: "Way Up the Ucletaw"

=== Milanollo ===
"Milanollo" was written by German composer Johann Valentin Hamm for the Italian violinist sisters and child prodigies, Teresa and Maria Milanollo. They introduced it to England in 1845 during their tour of the European continent. In the late 19th century, it was officially authorised by the War Office as a regimental march for the Coldstream Guards in London and later became the official march of the Canadian GGFG. The march is used by the band to indicate a marchpast by the GGFG.

=== The British Grenadiers ===
The British Grenadiers was introduced in Britain as a Dutch military march during the reign of William III. The march and the lyrics that accompany it refers not to the Grenadier Guards Regiment but all Grenadiers and Fusilier units. The march is used by the band to indicate a marchpast by the CGG.

=== The Great Little Army ===
The Great Little Army was composed by British Army/Royal Marines bandmaster Kenneth J. Alford in 1916 and was made to honour the British and Allied victories that were made in the Western Front (World War I). The Canadian Army made the march its official march past in 2013 to replace "Celer Paratus Callidus" ("Quick, Clever and Ready"). The march is used by the band to indicate a marchpast by the Army.

=== The Maple Leaf Forever ===
The Maple Leaf Forever is a Canadian patriotic song written by Alexander Muir that is performed on national occasions and the marching on and off the colours.

=== Scotland the Brave ===
Scotland the Brave is a Scottish patriotic song which is considered an unofficial national anthem of Scotland. It is a common authorised pipe band march used during parades involving the pipes and drums.

=== Other marches ===
- Guards Armoured Division
- Army of the Nile
- Colonel Bogey March
- Imperial Echoes
- Vimy Ridge
- Vive la Canadienne
- Mon Ami
- St. Catharines
- Immortal Guardians March (original march)
- Riley Standard

== See also ==
- Central Band of the Canadian Armed Forces
- Canadian Grenadier Guards Band
- National Band of the Naval Reserve
- U.S. Army All-American Marching Band
