= Beating retreat =

Military Ceremony

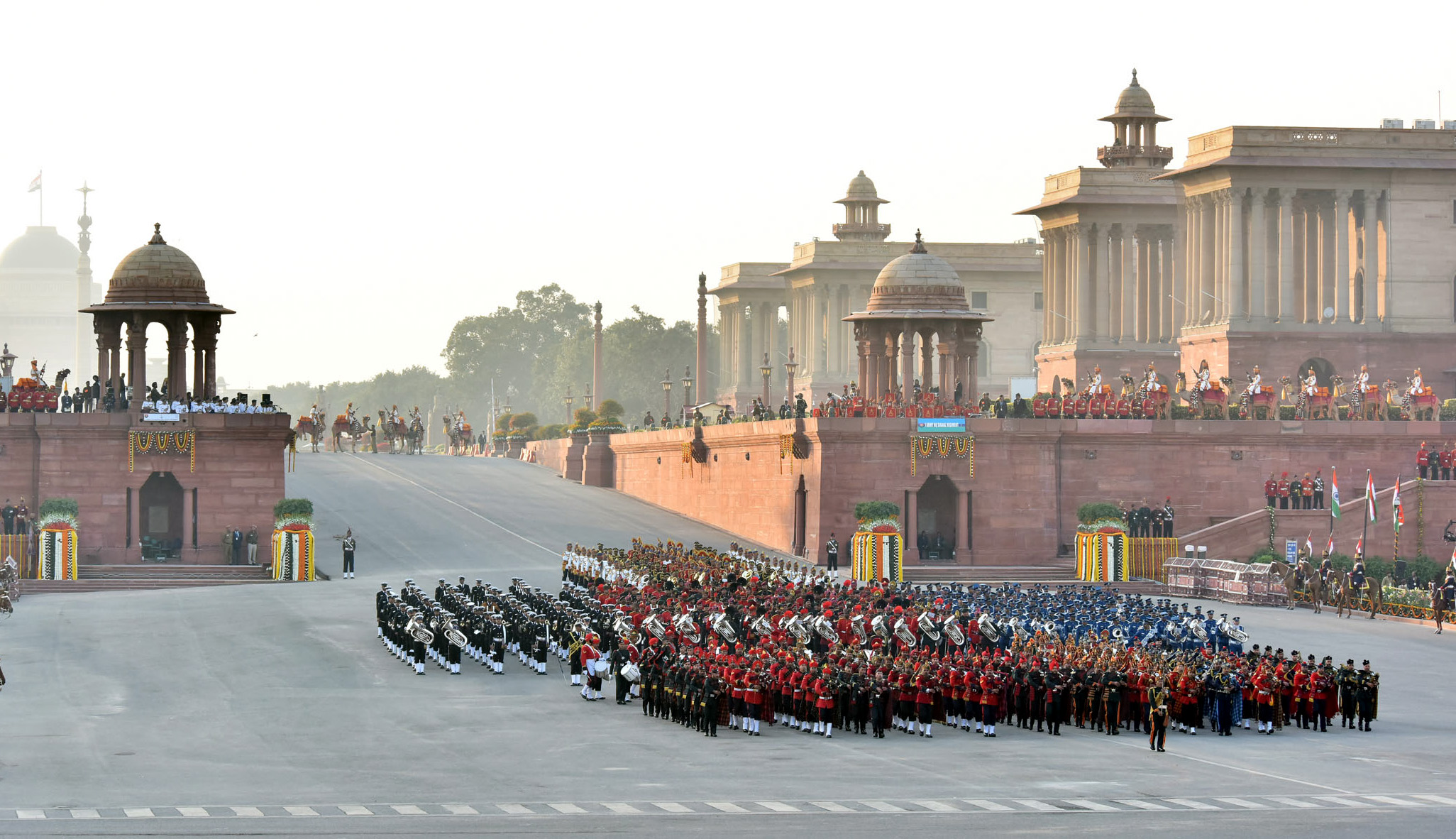
A band performance at India's Beat Retreat ceremony at Vijay Chowk in 2018.

Beating Retreat is a military ceremony dating to 17th-century England and was first used to recall nearby patrolling units to their castle.

== History ==
Originally it was known as watch setting and was initiated at sunset by the firing of a single round from the evening gun.

An order from the army of James II of England, otherwise known as James VII of Scotland, dated to 18 June 1690 had his drums beating an order for his troops to retreat and a later order, from William III in 1694 read "The Drum Major and Drummers of the Regiment which gives a Captain of the Main Guard are to beat the Retreat through the large street, or as may be ordered. They are to be answered by all the Drummers of the guards, and by four Drummers of each Regiment in their respective Quarters". However, either or both orders may refer to the ceremonial tattoo.

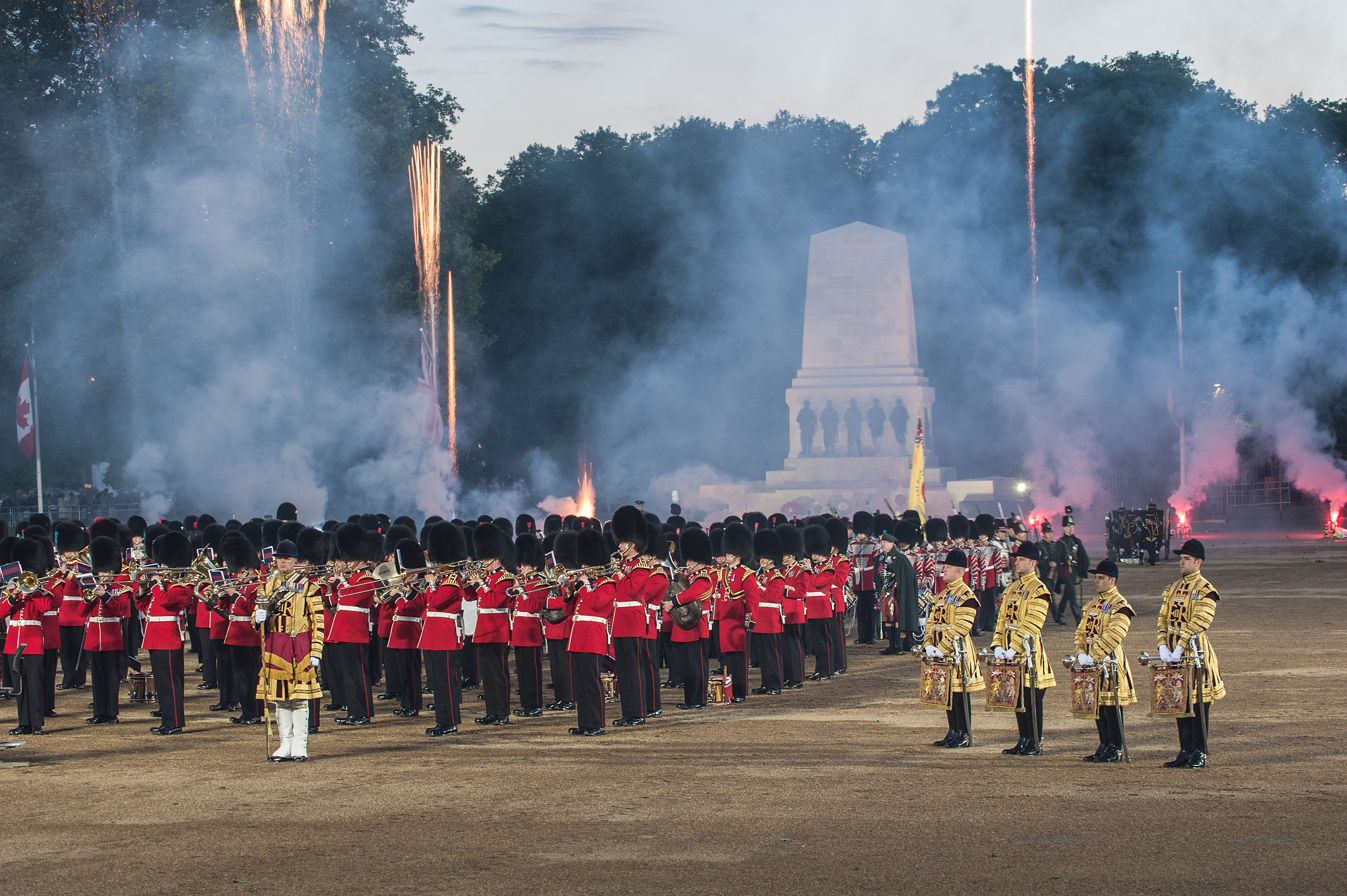
The Massed Bands of the Household Division perform in the fireworks finale at Beating Retreat 2013.

For the first time ever in England, a foreign band was allowed to play at the Beating Retreat on 5 June 2008. This band was that of the first Battalion Royal Malay Regiment, who had been helping to guard London, by mounting guards at the palaces. Amongst their performance pieces were arrangements of a number of well known pieces from Film.

The 2nd time this happened was during the June 2014 edition honouring the 70th year since D-Day, with two bands from the French Armed Forces and including the Royal Yeomanry and the Honourable Artillery Company.

The 3rd time this occurred was in June 2015, when the BR that year honoured the bicentennial jubilee of the Battle of Waterloo, with the Staff Band of the Bundeswehr taking part.

== United Kingdom ==
=== The Household Division ===
These days, most armed forces in the Commonwealth perform some ceremonial form of the retreat and it is often used as a proving test for new band members as well as a practice for difficult drill moves such as the Spin Wheel. The ceremonies generally involve the marching of a band, the firing of cannon and other decorative presentations. In many cases a castle is used as a prop or a backdrop for the parade (as in the Royal Edinburgh Military Tattoo).

The London version takes place on Horse Guards Parade. Each year, on the Wednesday and Thursday evenings preceding Trooping the Colour, the Massed Bands, Pipes and Drums and Corps of Drums of the Household Division, supported by The King's Troop Royal Horse Artillery and visiting military bands from other services around the world perform a sunset concert involving precision drill, horses, cannons and fireworks in time with the music. Historically, on at least one evening, a senior member of the British Royal Family has attended and taken the salute.

The concert raises money for the Army Benevolent Fund the Household Division Charitable Funds, which provide improved welfare and opportunities to Household Division serving soldiers and veterans.

- Note: Refer to See Also for list of Foot Guards Bands.

=== Massed Bands of His Majesty's Royal Marines ===
The Massed Bands of His Majesty's Royal Marines, numbering some two hundred, perform their beating retreat ceremony every two years (formerly three years) at London's Horse Guards Parade in celebration of the birthday of their Captain General, Charles III (as of 2022). Because of its popularity, it is generally over three nights.

The most recent events were in June 2012 in honour of the Diamond Jubilee of Elizabeth II, in June 2014 in honour of the RM's 350 years of service to the nation and also the first to feature a guard of honour company from 40 Commando Brigade and bands from the United States Marine Corps and the Netherlands Marine Corps, and in June 2016, also marking the 90th birthday of Elizabeth II and the first to be streamed live on Facebook. An event was held in May 2018, marking the Sapphire Jubilee of Elizabeth II, and was followed by another in 2022, marking two milestones: the Platinum Jubilee of Elizabeth II (due to the COVID-19 pandemic, the 2020 event was cancelled) and the 40th anniversary of the Falklands War, thus also including a guard of honour from the Royal Navy.

The salute is usually taken by the Captain General, the First Sea Lord or the Commandant General. Until 2016, the ceremony was often attended by all three. Sometimes a senior member of the royal family (such as Prince William in 2018) or other dignitaries take the salute instead.

The Royal Marines' ceremony should not be confused with that of the Army which takes place every year, also in June. Four to five bands belonging to the Royal Marines Band Service comprise the massed bands for the ceremony. The ceremony's charity partner is the RNRMC.

=== The Rifles ===
Sounding Retreat is the variant form of the ceremony done by the Band of The Rifles, and formerly of the bands of the Light Division. The reason is that bugles are used in the ceremony in sounding Sunset (known as Retreat in the Army), given the origins of the British light infantry branch.

The Bands of the Rifles and the Brigade of Gurkhas, together with the buglers from the former and the Light Division Buglers Association, mounted on 31 May and 1 June 2016 the first-ever Sounding Retreat on Horse Guards Parade since 1993 and the creation of the Band of the Rifles (formerly Light Division) on the basis of the battalion bands of both The Light Infantry and the Royal Green Jackets, themselves descendants of the predecessor light infantry and rifle regimental bands of the British Army before the 1968 creation of the LD.

== Australia ==
The Australian Defence Force traditional ceremony of Beating Retreat was handed down from the British Army. The first ceremony including performance of Tchaikovsky's "1812 Overture" was held at the Royal Military College, Duntroon in 1968. Although this inaugural performance was a relatively low-key affair, the ceremony has since become an annual event at RMC and is well supported by the service community and the general public. The modern ceremony is thought to have its origins in the 16th century and combines three customs.

The first custom was originally performed by drummers only, marching on the ramparts to warn the soldiers that evening guard duties would soon commence. It also signalled soldiers outside the fortifications and labourers in the fields that the gates were about to be closed and they should retire within the walls for the night.

The second custom was practised on battlefields in past times when the fighting ceased at sunset. Following the Beating Retreat, many of the old regiments would say a prayer or sing a hymn in honour of their fallen, and the evening guard would fire three musket volleys "to put flight to the evil spirits of the enemy dead".

The final custom derives from the practice of lodging the Regimental Colour in the Colour Ensign's quarter when the evening guard was mounted. In modern times, that custom was replaced by the lowering of the national flag.

=== 2007 ceremony ===
The 2007 ceremony was conducted on the nights of 27 & 28 September. It was attended by Chief of the Defence Force ACM Angus Houston and Chief of the Army LTGEN Peter Leahy.

The ceremony included parade ground marching, changing of the sentries, trooping of the Regimental Colour, inspection of the guards, firing of the evening gun, guards advance and volley firing (with the service issue Steyr AUG), evening hymn, retreat and lowering of the Australian flag, the pipers lament and marching off of the Regimental Colour.

Music was performed by an ensemble of the Royal Military College Band and the Australian Army Band Tasmania, and included "All That Jazz" from the musical Chicago, Michael Bublé's "Spider-Man Theme", Christina Aguilera's "Candyman", the Celtic instrumental "Toss the Feathers" and instrumental versions of Phil Collins' "Against All Odds" and two Elvis Presley songs (in a "Tribute to the King").

The ceremony culminated with the "1812 Overture" accompanied by a battery of 105 mm Hamel light field guns, and a 5-minute fireworks display.

== Canada ==
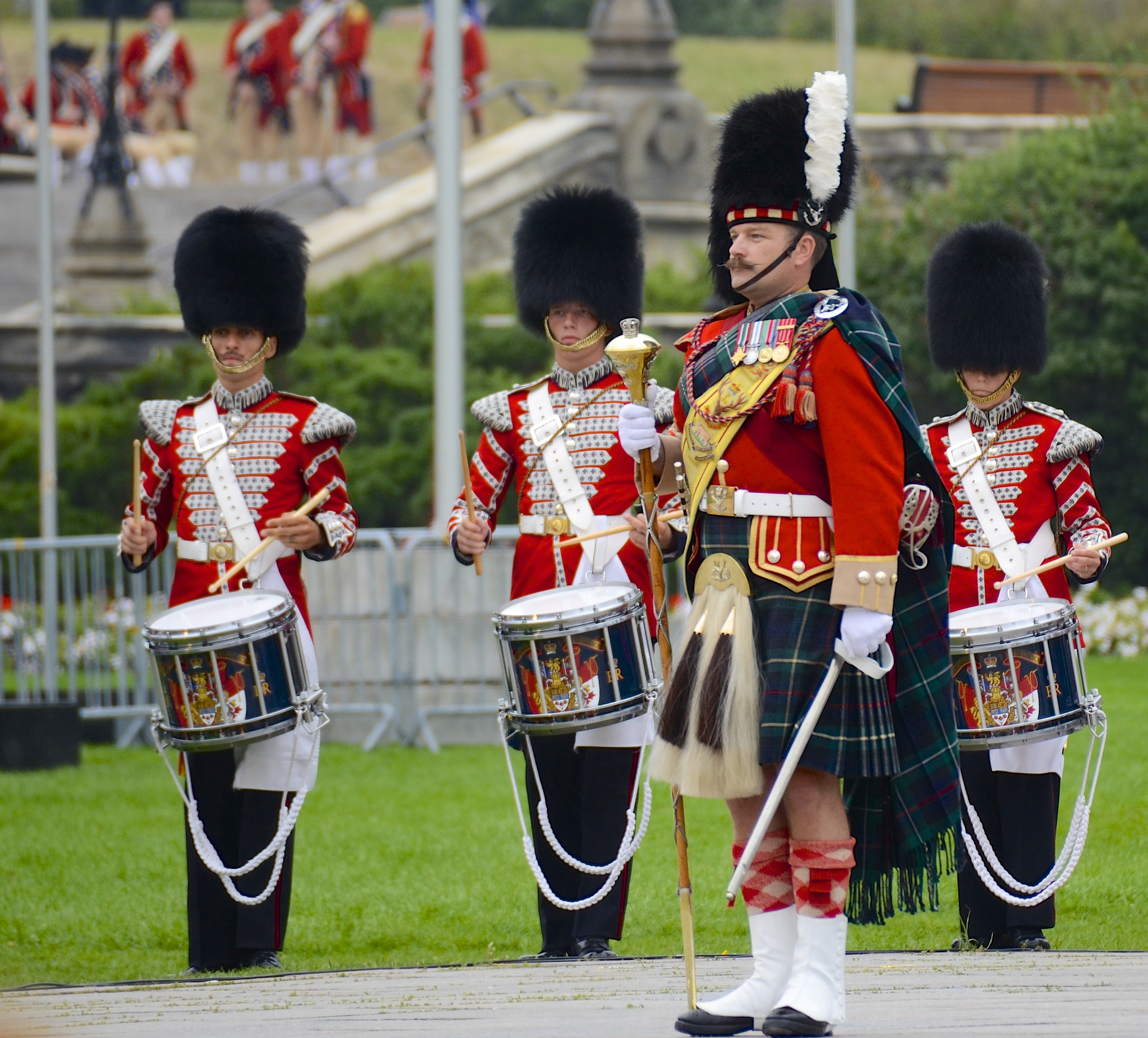
Band of the Ceremonial Guard at Fortissimo Sunset Ceremony in 2012.

The annual Fortissimo Sunset Ceremony in of the Canadian Forces is the Canadian equivalent to the beating retreat ceremony. It usually held on a July evening on the grounds of Parliament Hill in the capital of Ottawa and is organized by the Ceremonial Guard and its combined bands. The ceremony is unique in that it combines the Beating Retreat ceremonies with that of military tattoos and the lowering of the Canadian flag. This ceremony is also the main event at the festival. Like its name implies, the guard serves ceremonial public duties inside the Canadian capital. In previous years, foreign drill units have also taken part in the tattoo, including units such as the German Navy Silent Drill Team, the Bermuda Regiment Band, the Old Guard Fife and Drum Corps and the 2nd Marine Aircraft Wing Band.

== India ==
=== Background and history ===
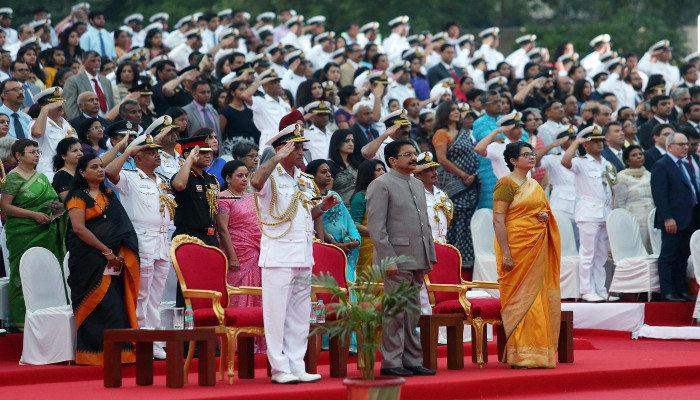
Beating Retreat and Tattoo ceremony at Gateway of India.

Beating retreat in India officially denotes the formal end of Republic Day festivities. It is conducted on the evening of 29 January, the third day after the Republic Day and is organized by Section D of the Ministry of Defence. It is performed by the bands of all branches of the armed forces, the Indian Army, Indian Navy and Indian Air Force, and pipe bands from the Army, and a massed formation of bands of the Central Armed Police Forces and the Delhi Police. The venue is Raisina Hills and an adjacent square, Vijay Chowk, flanked by the North and South blocks of the Central Secretariat and the Rashtrapati Bhavan towards the end of Kartavya Path.

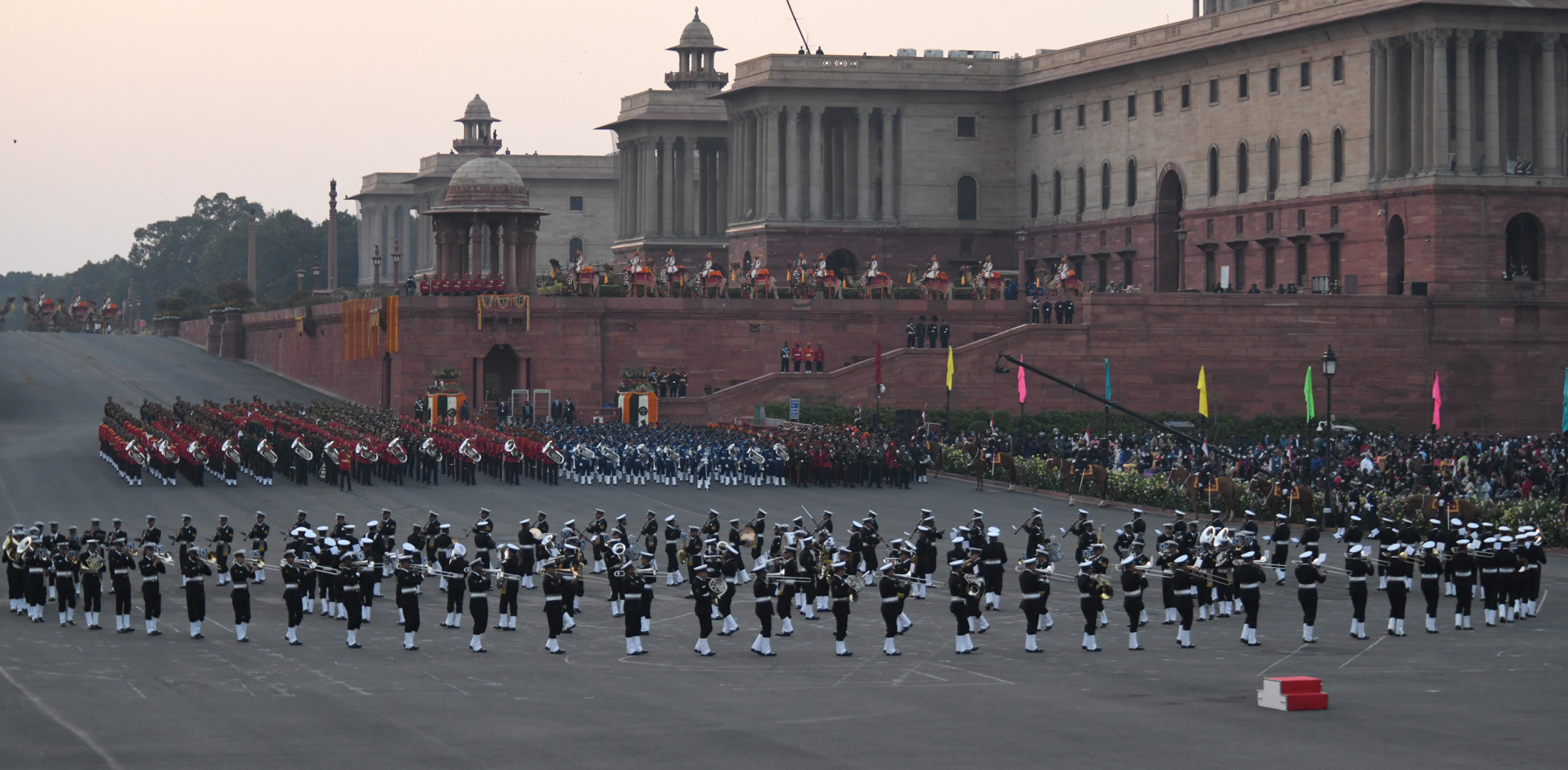
Band performing at the ‘Beating Retreat’ ceremony 2022.

The ceremony was started in 1955 and has been a hallmark of Republic Day celebrations ever since. Brig Bewoor and Maj Roberts of Ceremonial and Welfare Directorate of Indian Army conceived the first Beating Retreat in India. Army, Air Force and Navy bands consisting of pipes, drums, buglers and trumpeters from various regiments took part. It has become an official ceremony to have a Head of State of a country as the chief guest and that year the Beating Retreat was in their honour.

=== Order of ceremony ===
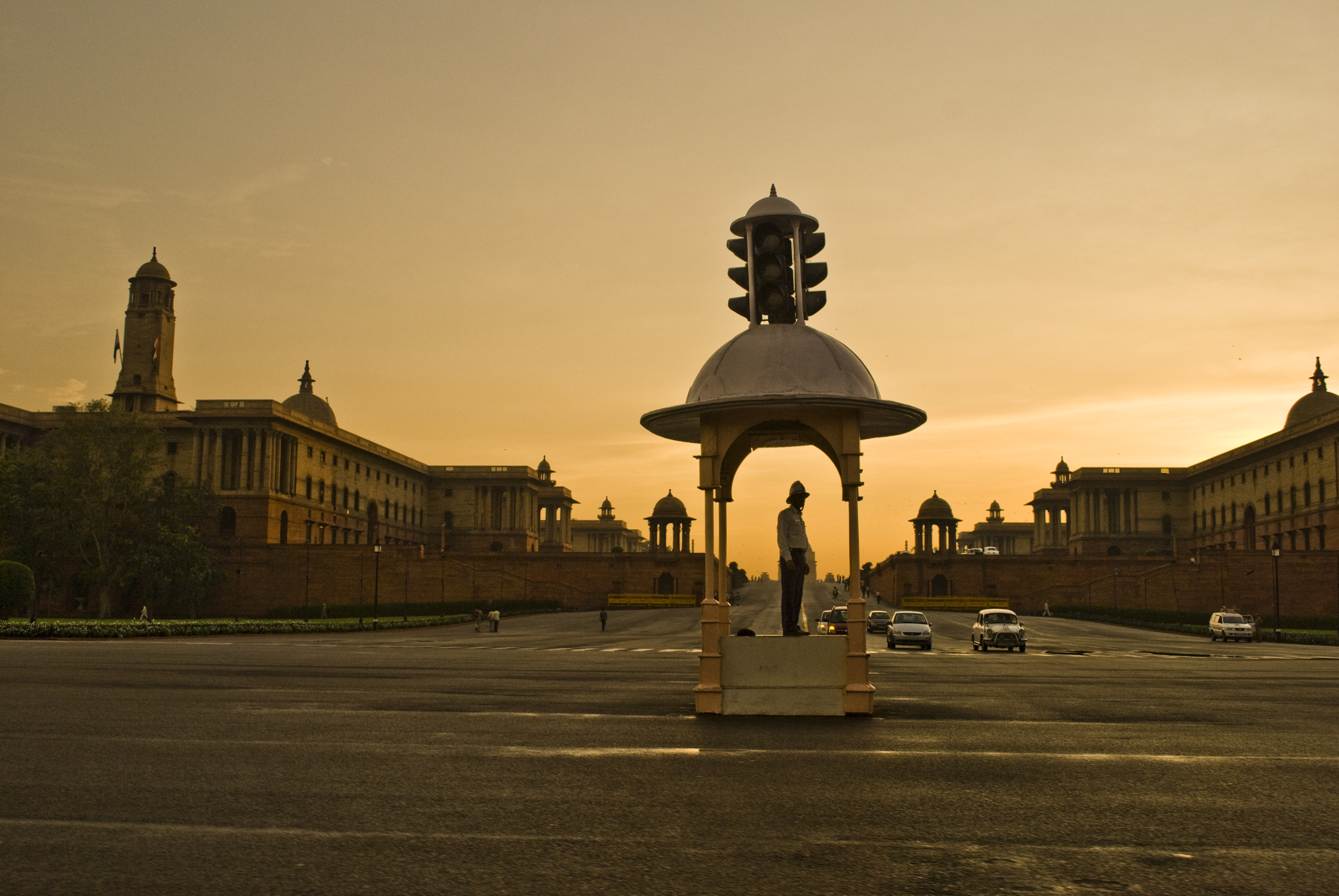
Vijay Chowk at Kartavya Path, with Secretariat Buildings in the background, New Delhi, the venue of the Beat Retreat ceremony.

The chief guest of the function is the President of India who arrives escorted by the President's Bodyguard (PBG). When the President arrives, a fanfare is sounded by the trumpeters of the Brigade of the Guards on their fanfare trumpets, and then the PBG commander asks the unit to give the national salute, which is followed by the playing of the Indian national anthem, Jana Gana Mana, by the massed bands, and at the same time by the unfurling of the flag of India on the flagpole right at the Vijay Chowk.

The ceremony starts by the massed bands of the three services marching in unison, playing popular marching tunes like Colonel Bogey March, Sons of the Brave and Qadam Qadam Badhaye Ja. The fanfare by the buglers is then followed by the bands of the Navy and the Air Force. This part of the ceremony ends with their compound marches involving movements to form intricate and beautiful patterns and concert pieces. Then the pipes and drums of the Indian Army play traditional Scottish tunes and Indian tunes like Gurkha Brigade, Neer's Sagar Samraat and Chaandni. The pipe bands also does a compound march and formation numbers. The massed military bands of the Indian Army perform last, marching forward in quick time, then breaking into slow time, then by the "compound marches". The massed military bands, again, breaks into quick time and goes back to the farthest end of Raisina Hills to reunite with the other bands. One such beating retreat ceremony by the Armed Forces bands was during the 1982 Asian Games closing ceremony in New Delhi, for which the credit went to the Indian Army's retired music director Harold Joseph, and the Indian Navy's Jerome Rodrigues and M.S. Neer, some of the greatest musicians, conductors, composers and instrumentalists of the Indian Armed Forces bands, who had led the massed bands at the ceremony.

Aside from these, the 2016 retreat saw the first appearance of marching bands from Central Armed Police Forces and the Delhi Police, plus performances by the Army Symphony Orchestra and Traditional Ensemble, the latter using a mix of traditional European and Indian instruments. The use of certain Indian instruments which require the musician to sit down while playing are a departure from the concept of the ceremony being one that is usually executed by musicians while marching. The appearance of Police Forces was a recognition of their role being as vital as that of the Indian Armed Forces. The massed bands of the CAPFs, in recent events, perform before the military bands.

All five to six band contingents march forward and take position close to the President's seat. The drummers, mostly from the Army's pipe bands, give a solo performance, known as the Drummer's Call. A regular feature of this pageant is the last tune played before the Retreat, when the national flag is lowered. It is the famous hymn written by Henry Francis Lyte, Abide With Me(replaced by " Ae Mere Watan Ke Logon) set to music by William Henry Monk and one of Mahatma Gandhi's personal favorite hymns, and has remained part of the ceremony over the years when many other foreign tunes were phased out to make way for Indian tunes, especially during the 2011 ceremony. The chimes made by the tubular bells, placed quite at a distance, creates a mesmerising ambiance.

This is followed by the bugle call for sunset by the buglers, and all the flags are slowly brought down. The band master then marches to the President and requests permission to take the bands away, and informs that the closing ceremony is now complete. The bands march back playing a popular martial tune and the official march of the Armed Forces, Sare Jahan se Accha. As soon as the bands cross Raisina Hills a spectacular illumination and Son et lumière display is set up on the North and South Blocks of the Parliament building with music and narration as the buildings' lightings are lit in front of the audience. As the President's Bodyguard (PBG) horse-mounted troops arrive back in after the bands leave, the band stops as another band from the Army is stationed to play the national anthem again as the President receives the final salute for the day by the PBG, before the President and the PBG depart with the bands leading the way, dispersed on the Rajpath leading to the Rashtrapati Bhavan and the Secretariat Buildings.

In the past, this finale was also followed up by a short fireworks display.

== Pakistan ==
The Wagah border closing 'lowering of the flags' ceremony is a daily military practice that the security forces of India (Border Security Force) and Pakistan (Pakistan Rangers) have jointly followed since 1959.

The ceremony has been filmed and broadcast by Michael Palin for one of his television around-the-world travel programs; he described it as a display of "carefully choreographed contempt."

== Jordan ==
The Beating Retreat of the massed pipe and brass bands of the Royal Jordanian Army is held in the national capital of Amman. In attendance is usually the King and Queen of Jordan, as well as many other senior members of the House of Hashim, the Government, and the military establishment. The ceremony is held in connection with the celebrations of Independence Day, Army Day and the Great Arab Revolt (held in May, June and September respectively). The ceremony has taken place annually since the early 1950s, when it was introduced by King Hussein of Jordan. Organized by the Royal Guard, the tattoo features the Jordanian Armed Forces Band, the Al Hussein Musical Pipe Band, the armed forces drill team, and a camel mounted equestrian drill team.

== New Zealand ==
The New Zealand Defence Force traditionally displays a Beating Retreat ceremony every year around Anzac Day. Most ceremonies see musicians of the New Zealand Army Band, and troops of the New Zealand Army and the Royal New Zealand Air Force on parade forming a guard of honour for the reviewing officer, usually the Governor-General of New Zealand or the Mayor of Wellington.

== United States ==
The "Ceremony of Beating retreat" takes place annually at the United States Merchant Marine Academy and usually includes the USMMA Band and selected midshipmen. The ceremony takes place on a parent weekend, in order to give parents of midshipmen an opportunity to attend. Concurrently, at The Citadel there is a weekly tradition of retreat parades which were first written into regulations in 1845. Combining drill elements and a performance by The Regimental Band and Pipes, the purpose is to inspect the Corps, render honors, preserve tradition and foster a sense of unity among cadets. Some of the college's parades also include award presentations and recognitions for alumni and other honored guests.

Besides these examples, the United States Marine Corps Friday Evening Parade and Sunset Parade are the closest military equivalent to the Household Division Beating Retreat. Both parades are military tattoos that are performed by the troops of Marine Barracks, Washington, D.C., who are personnel of the USMC, thus they are more modeled on the biannual Royal Marines ceremony.

== See also ==
- Republic Day of India
- Delhi Republic Day parade
- Trooping the Colour
- Changing the Guard
- Großer Zapfenstreich
- Ceremony of the Flags

List of Foot Guards Bands:

- Coldstream Guards Band
- Grenadier Guards Band
- Irish Guards Band
- Scots Guards Band
- Welsh Guards Band
