= List of international trips made by Ludwig Erhard =

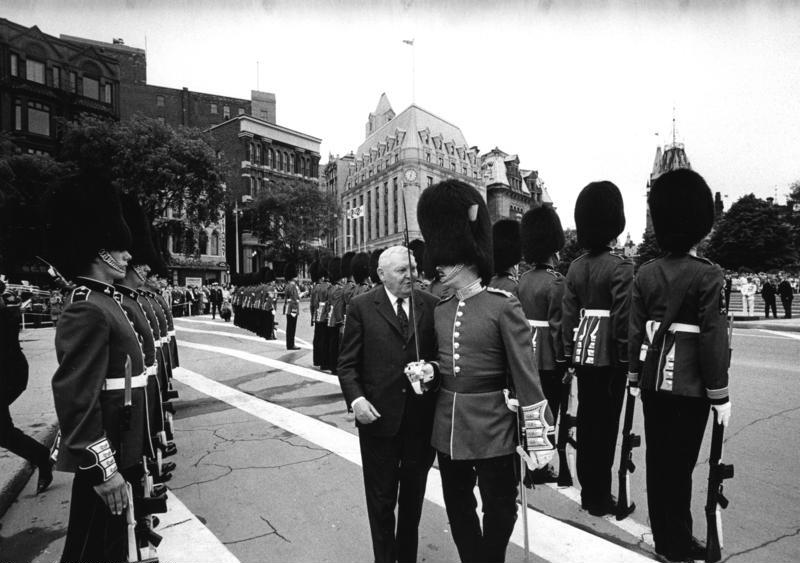
Erhard inspecting a guard of honour provided by the 1st Battalion, The Canadian Guards during a visit of to Ottawa in 1964

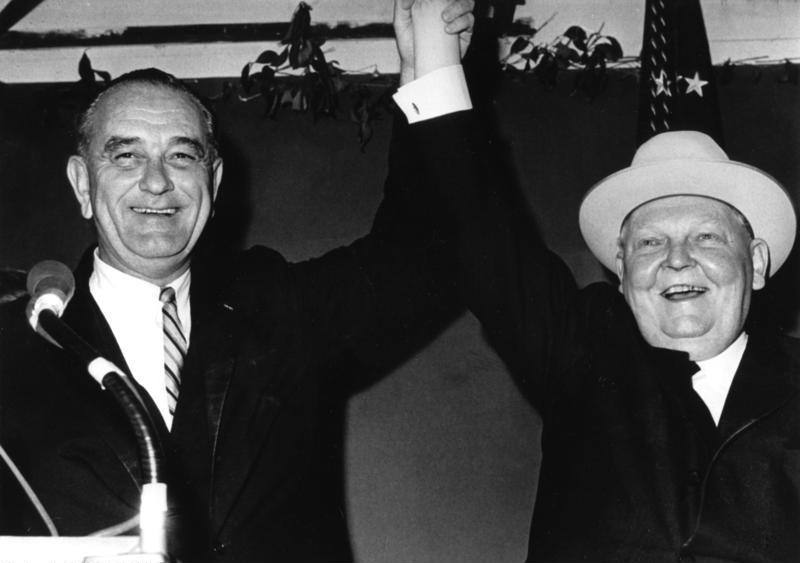
Johnson and Erhard, December 1963

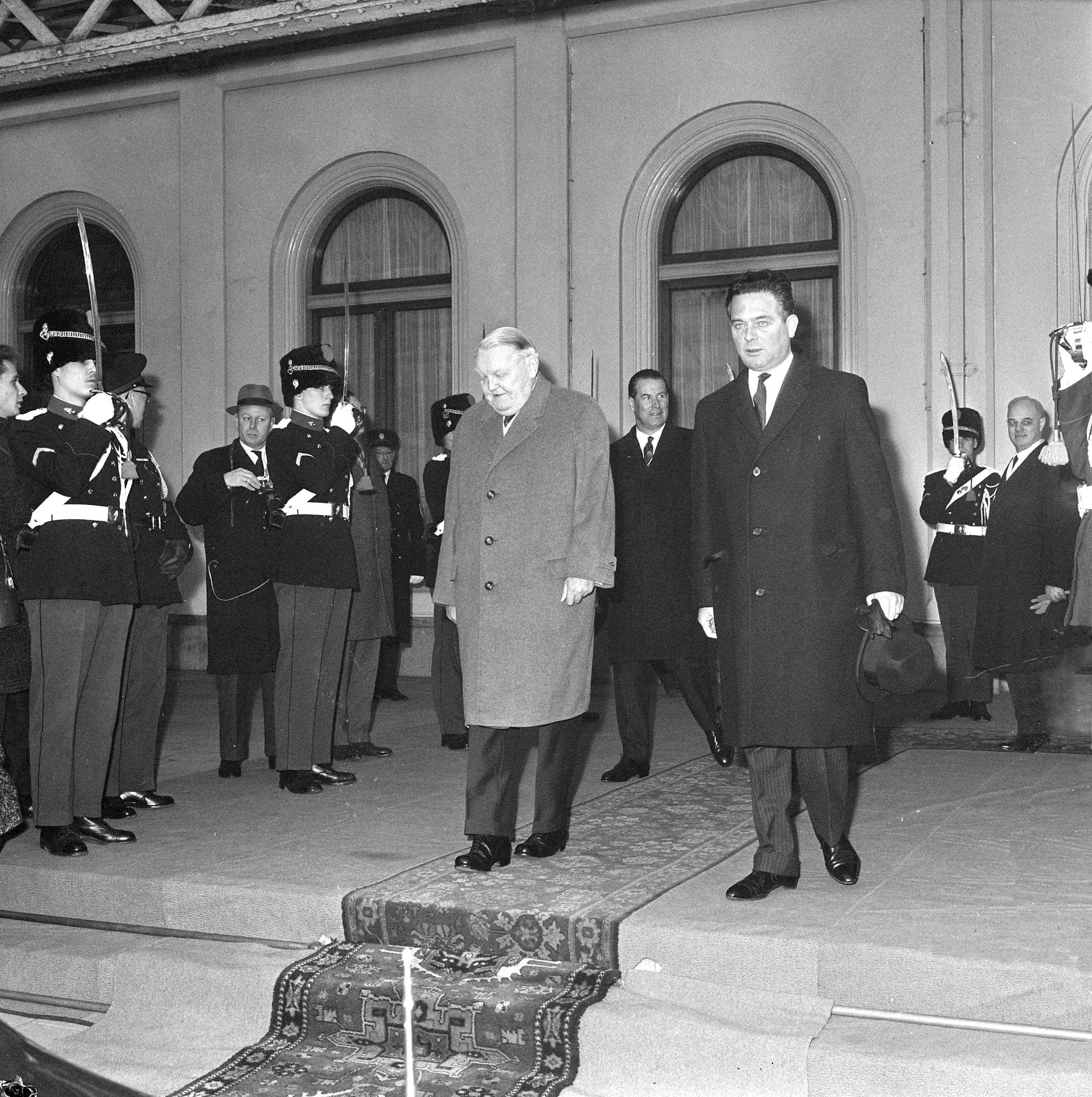
Erhard during a visit to the Netherlands in March 1964

This is a list of international trips made by Ludwig Erhard, the 2nd Chancellor of West Germany, during his tenure from 17 October 1963 to 30 November 1966.

== Summary of international trips ==
Country	Areas visited	Date(s)		Details
France	Paris	21-22 November	1963	
United States	Washington, D.C.	25 November	1963	State funeral of John F. Kennedy
United States	LBJ Ranch, Texas	28-29 December	1963	
United Kingdom	London	15-16 January	1964	
Italy	Rome	27-28 January	1964	
Vatican		29 January	1964	
France	Paris	14-15 February	1964	
Netherlands	Wassenaar; The Hague	1-2 March	1964	
Belgium	Brussels	23-24 April	1964	
Luxembourg	Luxembourg City	4 May	1964	
Canada	Ottawa	9-11 June	1964	
United States	Cambridge, Massachusetts; New York City.	11-13 June	1964	
Denmark	Aarhus; Copenhagen	8-9 July	1964	
France	Paris	19-21 January	1965	
United States	New York City	3 June	1965	
France	Paris	8 February	1966	
Norway	Oslo	28 August-1 September	1966	
Sweden	Stockholm	1-4 September	1966	
United States	Cape Kennedy.	26-27 September	1966	
