= Jordanian Armed Forces Band =

Musical unit of the Royal Jordanian Army

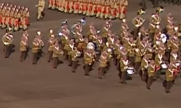
The massed army bands at the Flag Parade in June 2018.

The Jordanian Armed Forces Band (Arabic: فرقة القوات المسلحة الاردنية) is the main musical unit of the Royal Jordanian Army made up of musicians who perform in official settings usually in the presence of the Jordanian royal family. When performing, all band members wear red and white checked Keffiyehs alongside their full dress uniform. The band was established in 1921, with a core of 10 musicians who served with the Arab Army. In 1929, bagpipes from the area that is now Egypt and Syria were first introduced to the band. In 1982, Hussein of Jordan approved the use of the band for purely ceremonial purposes. Today, the full band is composed of over 500 musicians who are arranged in a similar fashion to the Bands of the Household Division.

The band maintains the following units:

- Marching Band
- Symphonic Band (founded in 1977)
- Pipes and Drums (located at the front of the formation)
- Brass Band
- Wind Band

The National Music Conservatory of the King Hussein Foundation often trains personnel of the band in a musical course aimed at preparing them for their inclusion in the band.

== Tasks ==
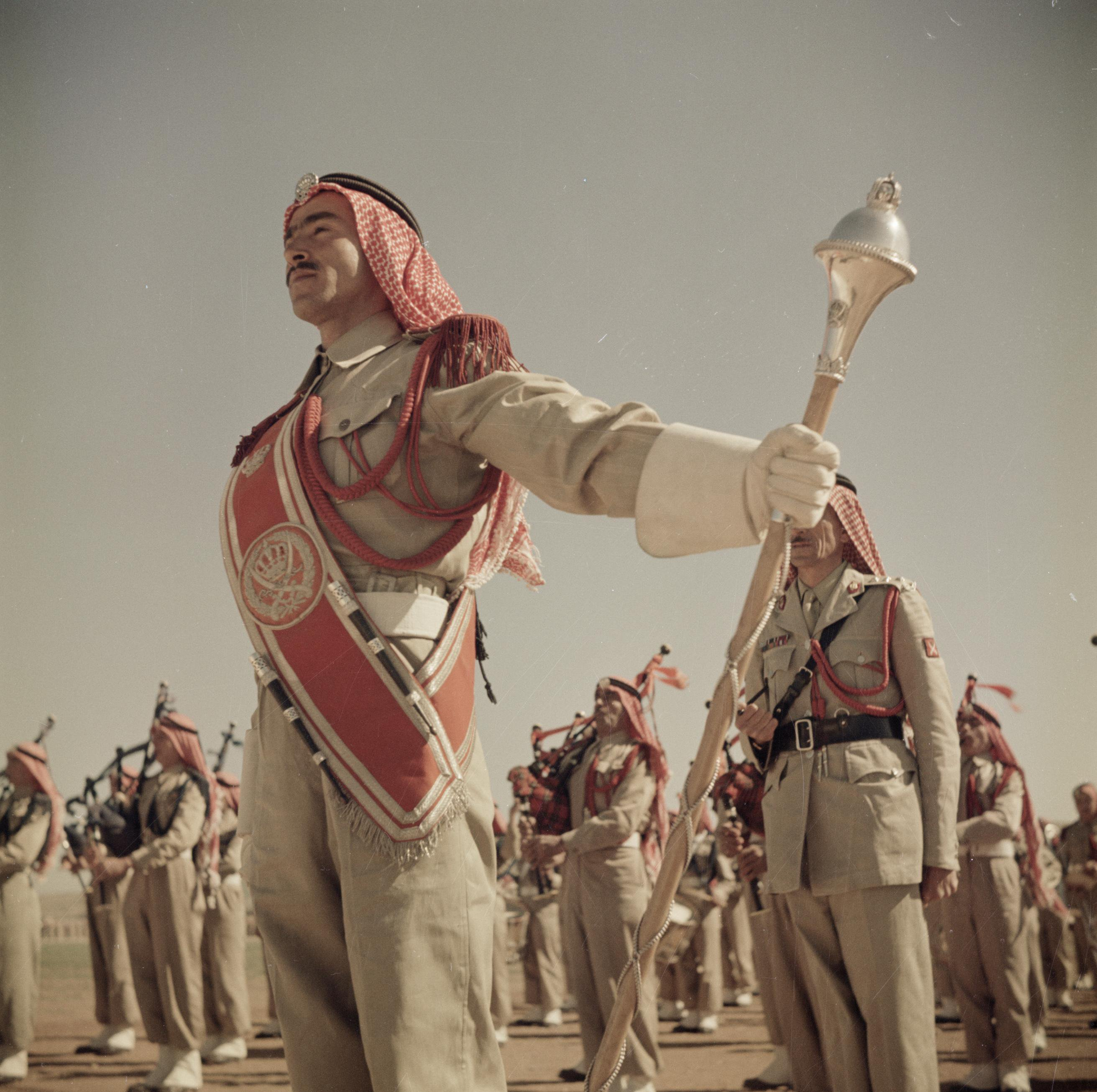
The drum major of the band, 1953.

Events that the band participates in includes following:

- State Visit Ceremonies – The band has the honor of performing at state arrival ceremonies at the Raghadan Palace for visiting head of state and government. During the ceremony, the band is located to the rear of the honour guard and performs The Royal Anthem of the Hashemite Kingdom of Jordan and anthem of the visiting countries.
- Flag Parade – The massed bands provides musical support at the Flag Parade, also more commonly referred to as the Trooping of the Colour, held annually on Al Rayah Square (Square of the Emblem) near the royal court.
- Beating Retreat – The band takes part in a massed pipe and brass band and performs in a military tattoo in the presence of the King and Queen of Jordan
- Independence Day – Performs ceremonial songs on the occasion, which is a public holiday in Jordan. The Great Arab Revolution March is a common piece that is played during the holiday.
- Military Tattoos – These international events include the Virginia International Tattoo and the Royal Edinburgh Military Tattoo
- Other events – Musicians of the band constantly invited to ceremonies of important official guests and public figures. The band often accompanies the King during his international trips.
