= Ceremonial Guard (Canada) =

Ceremonial military units in the Canadian Forces

- Garde de cérémonie (French)
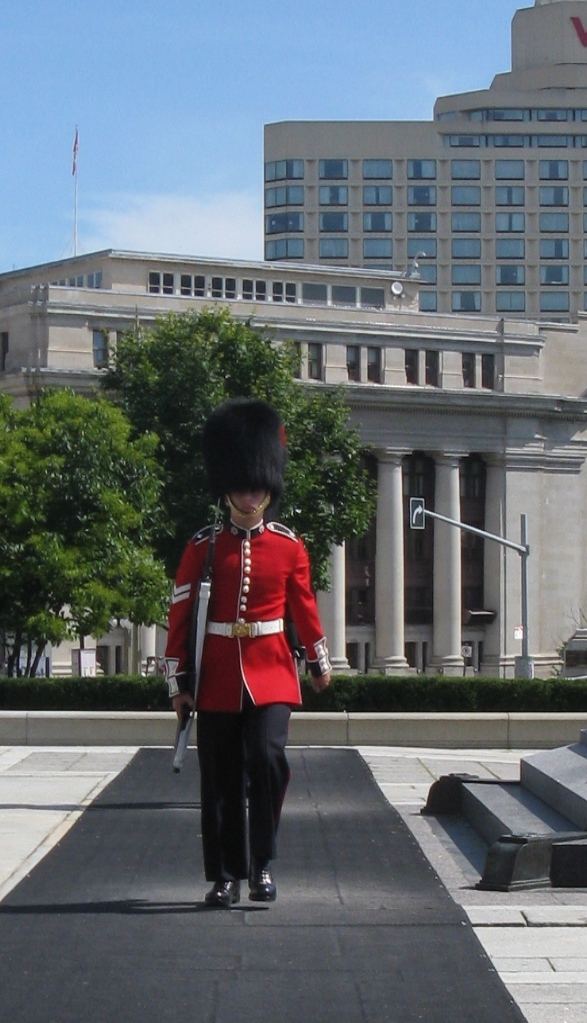
- A sentry of the Governor General's Foot Guards at the National War Memorial.
- Active: 1959-present
- Country: Canada
- Branch: Canadian Armed Forces
- Type: ad hoc Primary Reserve unit
- Role: Public Duties
- Size: 300
- Part of: Governor General's Foot Guards
- Garrison/HQ: Ottawa, Ontario
- Rifle: Colt Canada C7 (unloaded)

The Ceremonial Guard (CG; French: Garde de cérémonie) is an ad hoc military unit in the Canadian Armed Forces that performs the changing the guard ceremony on Parliament Hill and posts sentries at Rideau Hall, with the National War Memorial being sentried by the National Sentry Program (NSP), which is carried out by different regiments and other units in order of precedence throughout the summer until mid-November.

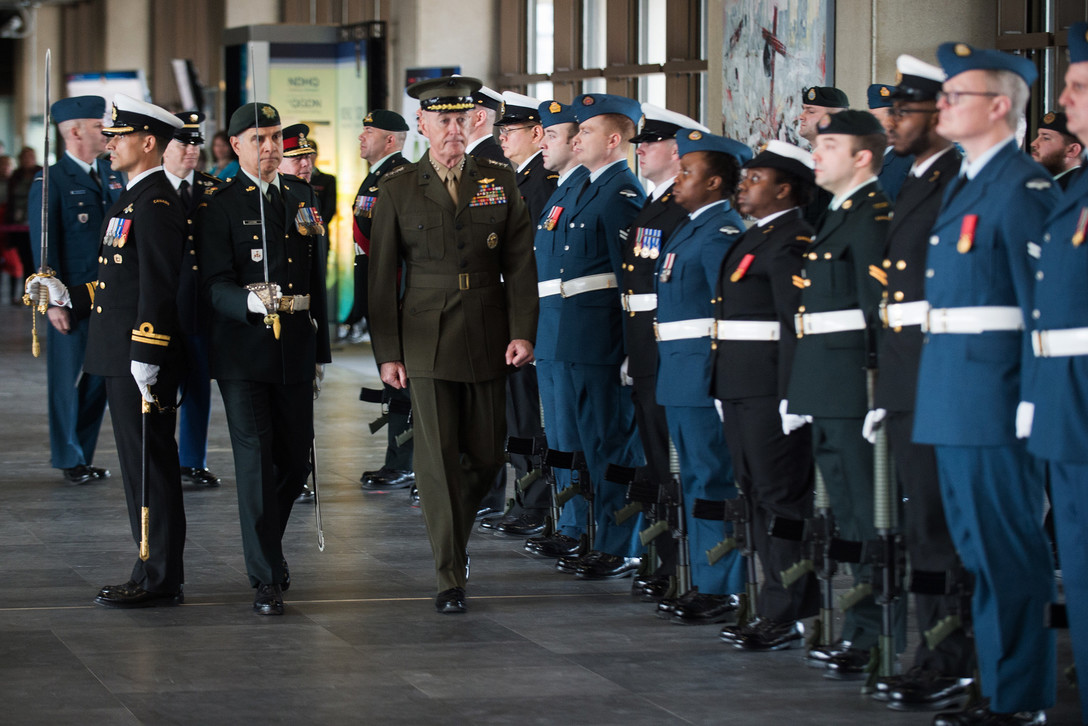
US General Joseph Dunford inspects members of the CG during a visit to Ottawa. The CG are wearing a mix of navy, army and air force uniforms.

The CG once drew principally from the two Primary Reserve (militia) regiments of foot guards; the Governor General's Foot Guards (GGFG) from Ottawa, of which the Ceremonial Guard is a sub-unit, and the Canadian Grenadier Guards (CGG) from Montreal, who assumed the duties of the Canadian Guards upon their disbandment. Since 2007, it has been staffed from a pan–Canadian Forces approach, drawing members from the Royal Canadian Navy, the Canadian Army and the Royal Canadian Air Force.

== History ==
=== Origin ===
The Ceremonial Guard originated from the Canadian Guards regiment, which served in ceremonial occasions for 20 years in the 1950s and 1960s. It conducted its first guard mount on Parliament Hill on 2 July 1959 in the presence of Queen Elizabeth II. Beginning in the early 1970s, the CGG and the GGFG were added to the Public Duties Detachment (PDD) of the Canadian Guards, due to it being reduced to nil strength in 1970.

=== Expansion ===
In 1971, the responsibility for the Changing of the Guard ceremony fell to the CGG and GGFG. In 1980, the Ceremonial Guard was created to execute public duties in the National Capital Region.

The PDD, which had been based at CFB Rockcliffe until 1985, changed its name to the Ceremonial Guard in 1979, when the unit became mixed sex due to a compromise by the Department of National Defence as a result of a complaint to the Canadian Human Rights Commission on the matter that women could not join the guard due to its status as an infantry unit.

=== Modernity ===
Since its inception, it has served for over 60 seasons spanning 60 years. In 2016, the Ceremonial Guard ceased to be an independent unit and was reformed as a sub-unit within the GGFG. In 2020, for the first time since its inception, the summer program was cancelled due to the COVID-19 pandemic.

In 2023, as a result of the Parliament Hill Rehabilitation process, there was no Changing of the Guard and no Fortissimo, with the "Canada on the March" marking Ceremonial Guard’s return after a three-year pause due to the pandemic.

== Composition ==
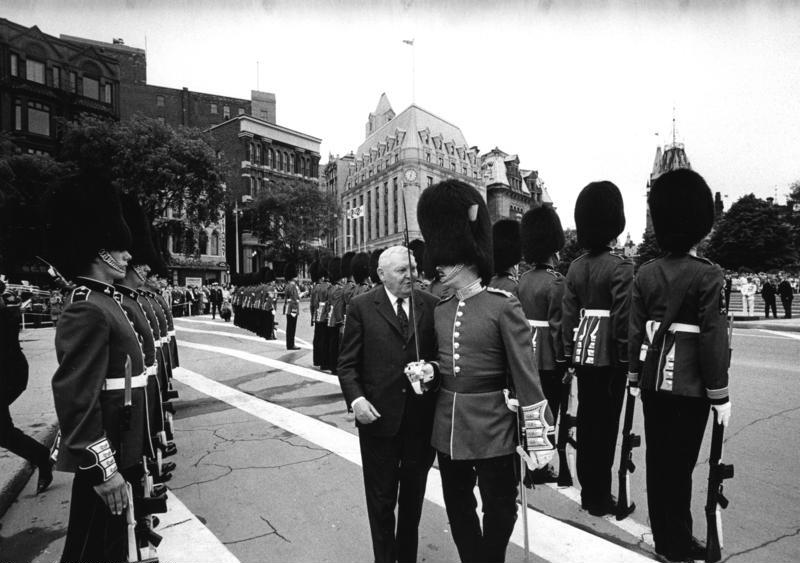
A guard of honour provided by the 1st Battalion, Canadian Guards, during the visit of West German Chancellor Ludwig Erhard to Ottawa in 1964.

When the Guard comes together, it consists of the following:

- Public Duties Company
  - 1st Division
  - 2nd Division
  - 3rd Division
  - PD Division
- Headquarters Company
- Band of the Ceremonial Guard
  - Pipes and Drums
  - Military Band

The total strength is about 350 people, the size of a small battalion. The uniforms worn represent both infantry guards regiments of the Governor General's Foot Guards (GGFG) from Ottawa and the Canadian Grenadier Guards (CGG) from Montreal. The Public Duties Company is further broken down into platoons and divisions. It has four divisions of about 20–26 soldiers. The CG can also form an ad hoc drill platoon from its ranks.

=== Personnel ===
The Ceremonial Guard maintains no regimental colour nor has it any battle honours of its own as it is not a permanent unit in the Canadian Forces' order of battle. The only colours flown in the ceremonies are those of the two guards regiments. The unit exists with a full composition only from the end of May to the end of August. During the rest of the year a small administrative corps remains to prepare for next year's public duties season, and beginning in early May the unit stands up partially to allow for the conduct of Basic Military Qualification and other military courses as required. The unit also plans and executes the Canadian Forces beating retreat "Fortissimo". This takes place each year in July in conjunction with month-long Canada Day celebrations. All members of the Ceremonial Guard are fully trained members of the Canadian Armed Forces (CAF).

As with any guard unit in the Canadian Forces, uniforms originate from the King's Guard, and rank insignia worn on the uniforms generally follow the pattern currently in force. Members of the CG each carry an unloaded Colt Canada C7 rifle.

=== Band ===
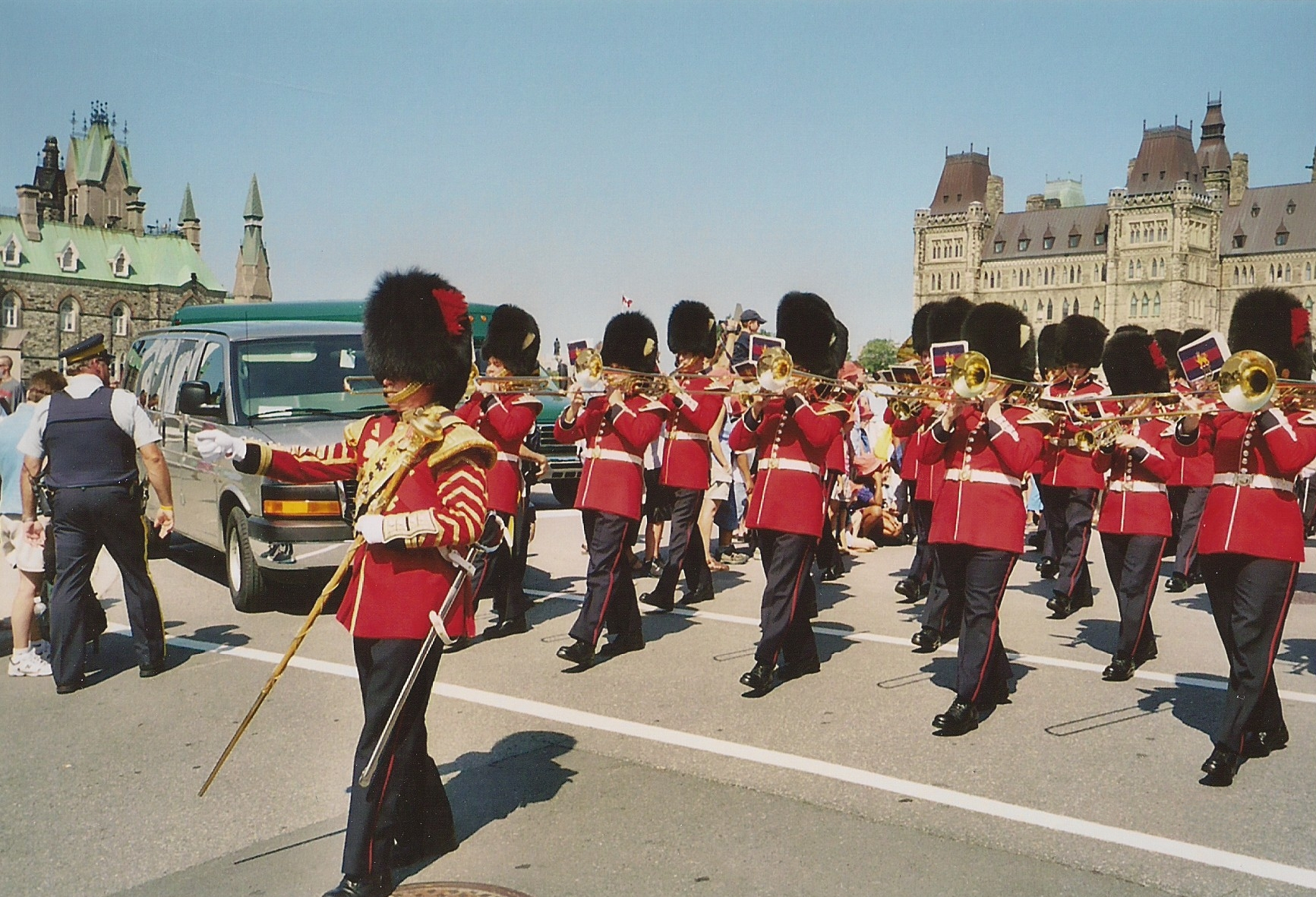
Band of the Ceremonial Guard

External videos
- 10 Provinces March
- Ceremonial Guard - Ottawa - 2016

The Ceremonial Guard also maintains its own military band and pipe band that form a separate company. The members of the Band of the Ceremonial Guard (Musique de la Garde de cérémonie) are made up of musicians from the GGFG and the CGG. Musicians are drawn from military units and colleges or universities across Canada, and are auditioned months in advance. All new musicians must pass the Canadian Armed Forces Basic Military Qualification Course (BMQ) before they can be employed with the Ceremonial Guard.

== Duties ==
The primary and most visible function of the Ceremonial Guard is, as mentioned, the Changing of the Guard on Parliament Hill in Ottawa. The Changing of the Guard Ceremony is a parade representing the changing of the guards/sentries posted at Rideau Hall, the official residence of the Canadian monarch and of the governor general. The tradition began on Canada Day in 1959 when the 1st Battalion of the Canadian Guards mounted the new guard on Parliament Hill with its band and corps of drums. The ceremony was so popular that the Ottawa Board of Trade asked for permission from the army to continue the ceremony the following year. A full company of two platoons is employed in daily public duties, with both divisions of one platoon parading as the "new guard" – those to take over duties at Rideau Hall – and the other platoon of the company split, one division parading as "old guard", and the other performing sentry duties at Rideau Hall and the Tomb of the Unknown Soldier for the day.

=== Changing ===
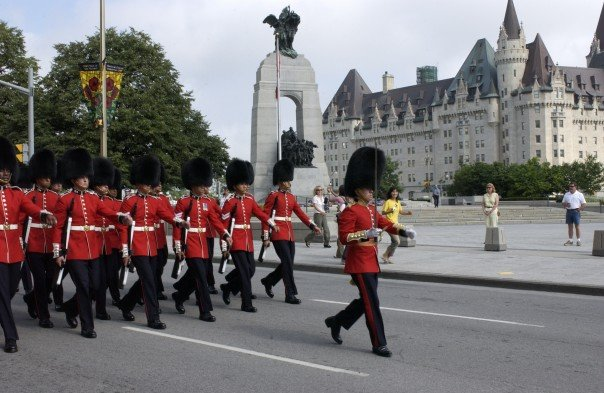
Canadian Grenadiers marching during CG

The parade begins at the Cartier Square Drill Hall with the drum major, followed by the band, and the two divisions of the "new guard". Turning north onto Queen Elizabeth Drive, the parade continues underneath the Laurier Avenue Bridge and then turns left onto the ramp leading onto Laurier Avenue. While the New Guard is en route to Parliament Hill the Old Guard forms up behind the East Block with the colour. They set off at approximately 9:46 a.m. with the Pipes and Drums of the Ceremonial Guard leading. They march to the east lawn and move into position, then they await the New Guard arriving. The New Guard makes a right turn onto Elgin Street up to the National War Memorial and onto Wellington Street before the parade arrives on Parliament Hill precisely at 10 a.m. At this time the band begins to play "The 10 Provinces March" by Howard Cable.

The parade marches onto the east lawn of Parliament, with the band centred at the northernmost edge of the lawn and facing south. The old guard is in position on the west side of the east lawn and faces the east block, while the new guard marches to the east side of the lawn and faces west toward the old guard. After the old and new guards are formed from three ranks into two and independently dressed off for proper alignment, the two sergeants of the guard – commanders of the two divisions of new guard – advance to be inspected by the company sergeant-major. Following inspection, the number two division sergeant marches to his position while the number one division sergeant stands still. The new guard is then given the order "Get on parade", at which point they advance to the tune of "The British Grenadiers" from the band, and form up dressed off the sergeants of the guard. The new guard's persons and weapons are inspected by the company commander, and they are stood at ease.

Following the inspection of the new guard, the old guard is inspected. After this inspection, the sergeants of the guard and division seconds-in-command are ordered to "take post" – the sergeant of the guard marches from the right flank to directly behind the guard, while the second-in-command marches from the left flank to the right. The parade is then called to the present arms for the marching on of the regimental colours (If the governor general is currently in residence at Rideau Hall, the officers wear a gold sash and march on the King's Colour). With the colours marched on, the new guard advances at the slow march, ceremonially "taking up the ground" from the old guard. The old guard and new guard salute each other at present arms. Following this, the old guard commander presents the key to the Guard Room at Rideau Hall to the new guard commander. The parade is then formed into three ranks and marched off at the slow march, transitioning into the quick march. The order of march differs only in that the old guard is now at the rear.

=== Sentry ===
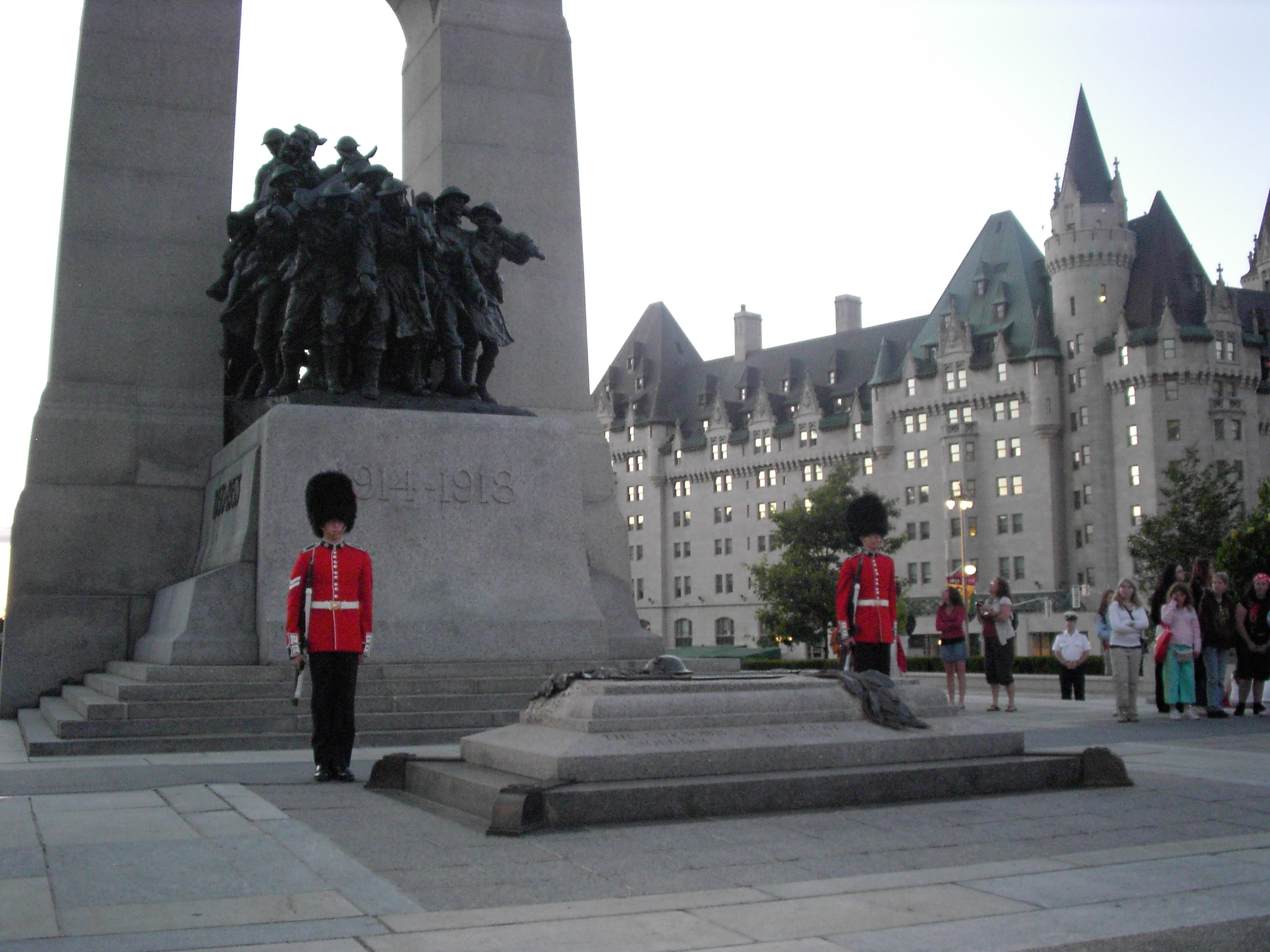
Two sentries at the Canadian War Memorial in Ottawa

The other highly visible public duty of the Ceremonial Guard is sentry duty at Rideau Hall, as the Canadian War Memorial is sentried by the National Sentry Program. The sentries are ceremonial only and do not generally perform actual guard duty; all are trained military personnel and procedures and orders exist for the Ceremonial Guard to adopt an armed night guard of Rideau Hall should sufficient security threat arise. The sentries at the tomb are part of National Sentry Program (April 9–November 11), which the CG organizes.

The sentries are posted daily from 9 a.m. to 5 p.m. EDT, every hour on the hour. At 9 a.m. the posting non-commissioned member (NCO) – generally a sergeant or a master corporal but sometimes a corporal from the ranks – marches out accompanied by the two sentries, two escorts, and a bagpiper. The posting NCO, sentries, and escorts are all dressed in full scarlet uniforms and carry rifles with bayonets fixed. The party marches to the Sussex Drive gate of Rideau Hall, where the first two sentries are posted and have their duties read to them. The party then marches back to Rideau Hall itself, where the two remaining sentries are posted and have their duties read. The sentries may change more often due to weather issues; e.g. on an extremely hot day.

Throughout the day Rideau Hall is visited by the officer commanding of the parade and the company sergeant-major. They generally elect to observe a relief of the sentries, and sometimes the officer commanding will take a report from the sentries on duty. The officer and the guard sergeant for Rideau Hall may also elect to do rounds to check on both of the sentry posts. Grand rounds may also be executed by the commanding officer of the unit.

==== October 2014 shootings ====
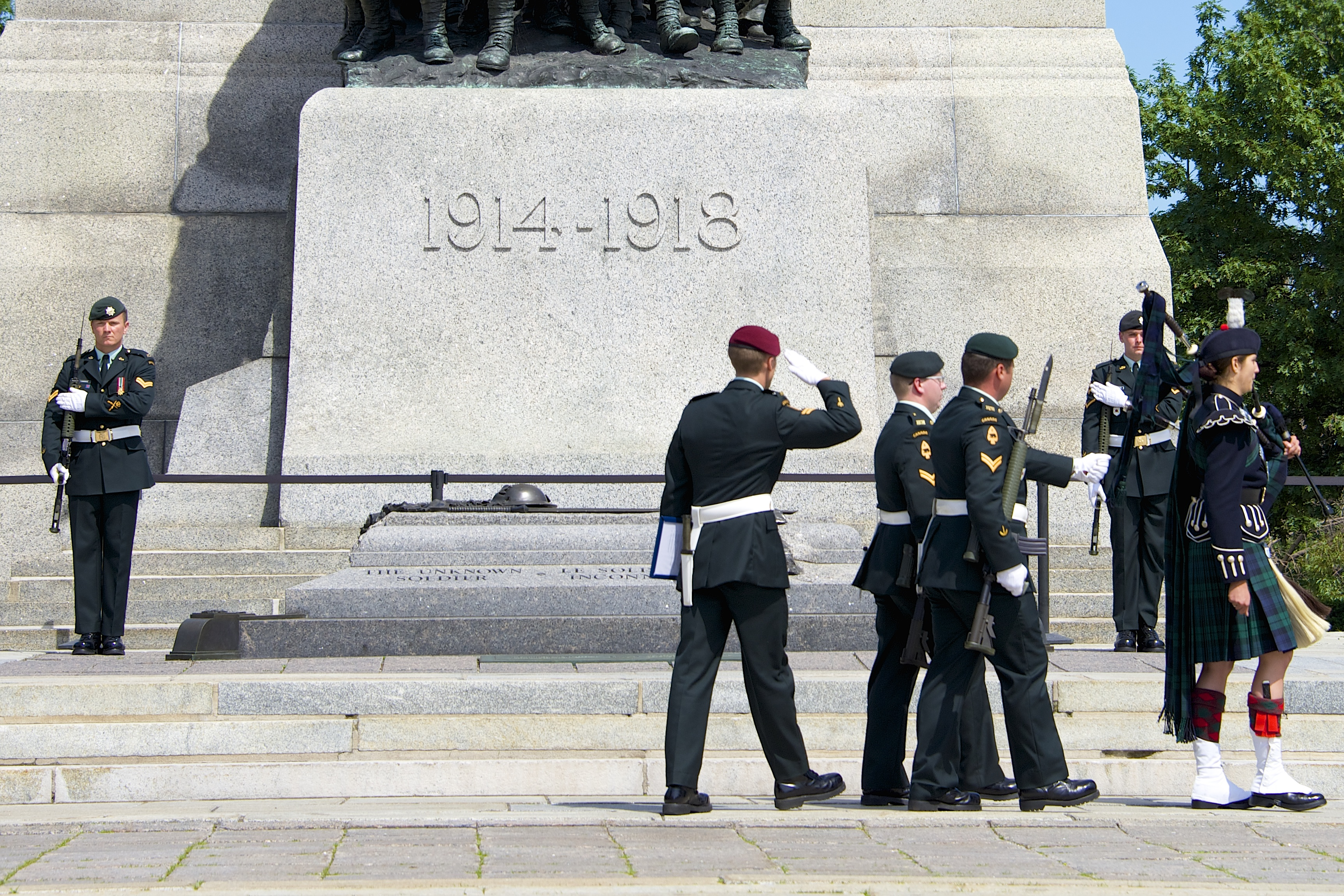
Corporal Nathan Cirillo was on sentry duty at the National War Memorial, similar to the sentries in this picture, when he was fatally shot.

On October 22, 2014, a gunman attacked multiple locations at Parliament Hill. Corporal Nathan Cirillo, a 24-year-old reservist with the Argyll and Sutherland Highlanders of Canada, was standing guard as a ceremonial sentry at the National War Memorial when he was shot with a hunting rifle by Michael Joseph Zehaf-Bibeau. Zehaf-Bibeau fired two shots: One at Cirillo, and one at another sentry, which missed. He then drove to Centre Block, and was subsequently killed in a firefight with Sergeant-at-Arms Kevin Vickers and RCMP Corporal Curtis Barrett. Corporal Cirillo died of his wounds later that day, at the Ottawa Hospital's Civic Campus.

== Other activities ==
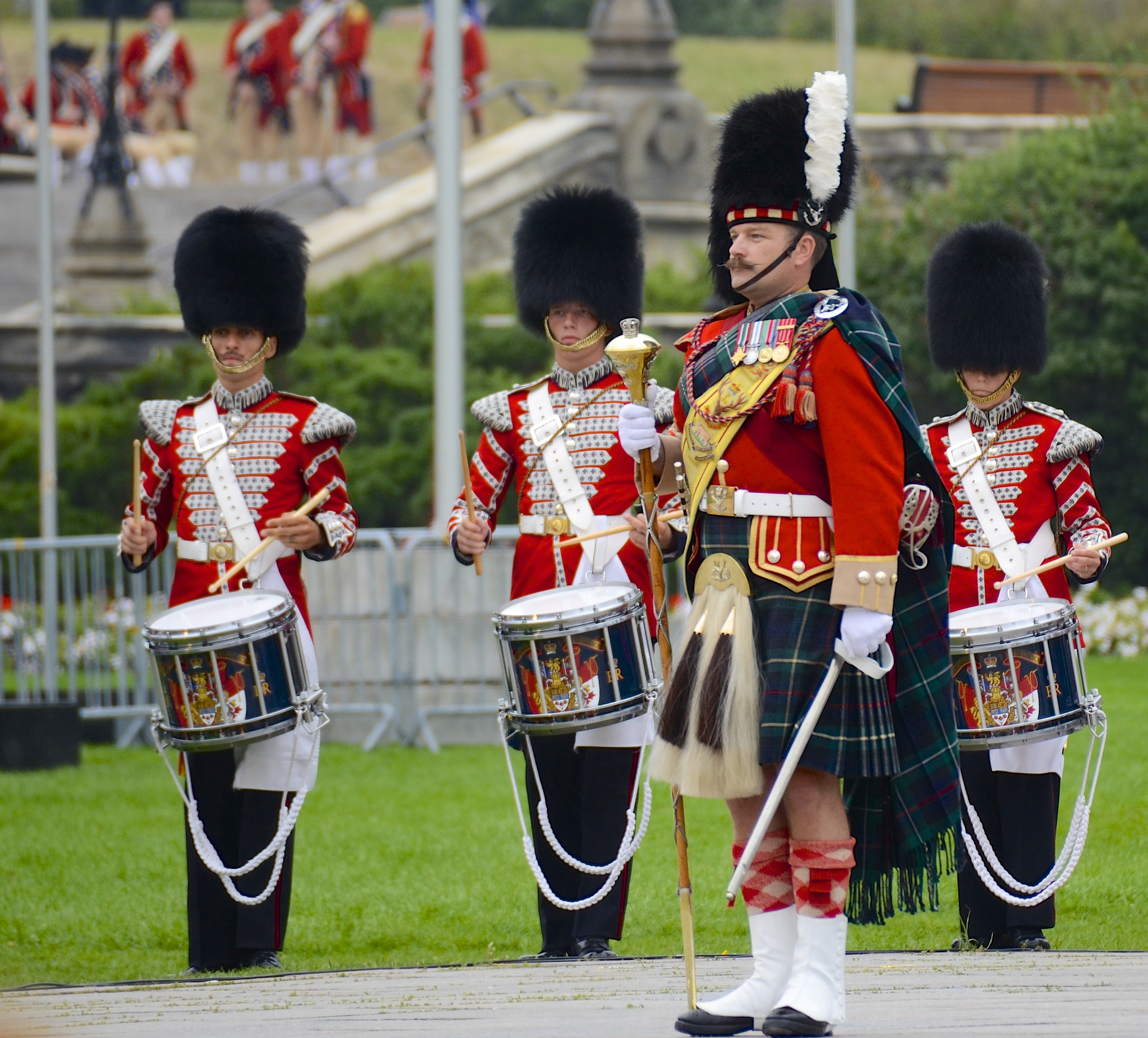
Band of the Ceremonial Guard at Fortissimo 2012

In addition to the Changing of the Guard, the Ceremonial Guard takes part in many other functions, such as the annual Governor General's review of the Guard. This inspection takes place prior to the first Guard mount on Parliament Hill normally in late June, the Canada Day celebration (specifically the noon show) on 1 July, the "Fortissimo" Sunset Ceremony that takes place in late July or early August on Parliament Hill, and the Guard's final parade, Trooping the Colour, at the end of August. It also participates in military funerals (for example, Opposition leader Jack Layton's procession at Parliament), important visits (Queen Elizabeth II in 2010, Prince William, Duke of Cambridge and Catherine, Duchess of Cambridge in 2011). The Band of the Ceremonial Guard has many engagements outside of public duties. The Ceremonial Guard's main mission and focus is in Ottawa, the capital city. In between their turns, alongside the regiments forming up the Ceremonial Guard, the Ontario and Quebec area personnel from the Army Primary Reserve regiments stationed in their respective provinces, alongside those from other provinces of the country, handle the guard changing duties only at the National War Memorial, reinforced by the Canadian Rangers and the Royal Canadian Mounted Police, as part of the aforementioned National Sentry Program of the Canadian Armed Forces.

== See also ==
- Australia's Federation Guard
- Fort Henry Guard
- London Guards
