= Fortissimo Sunset Ceremony =

Annual military music event held in Ottawa, Canada

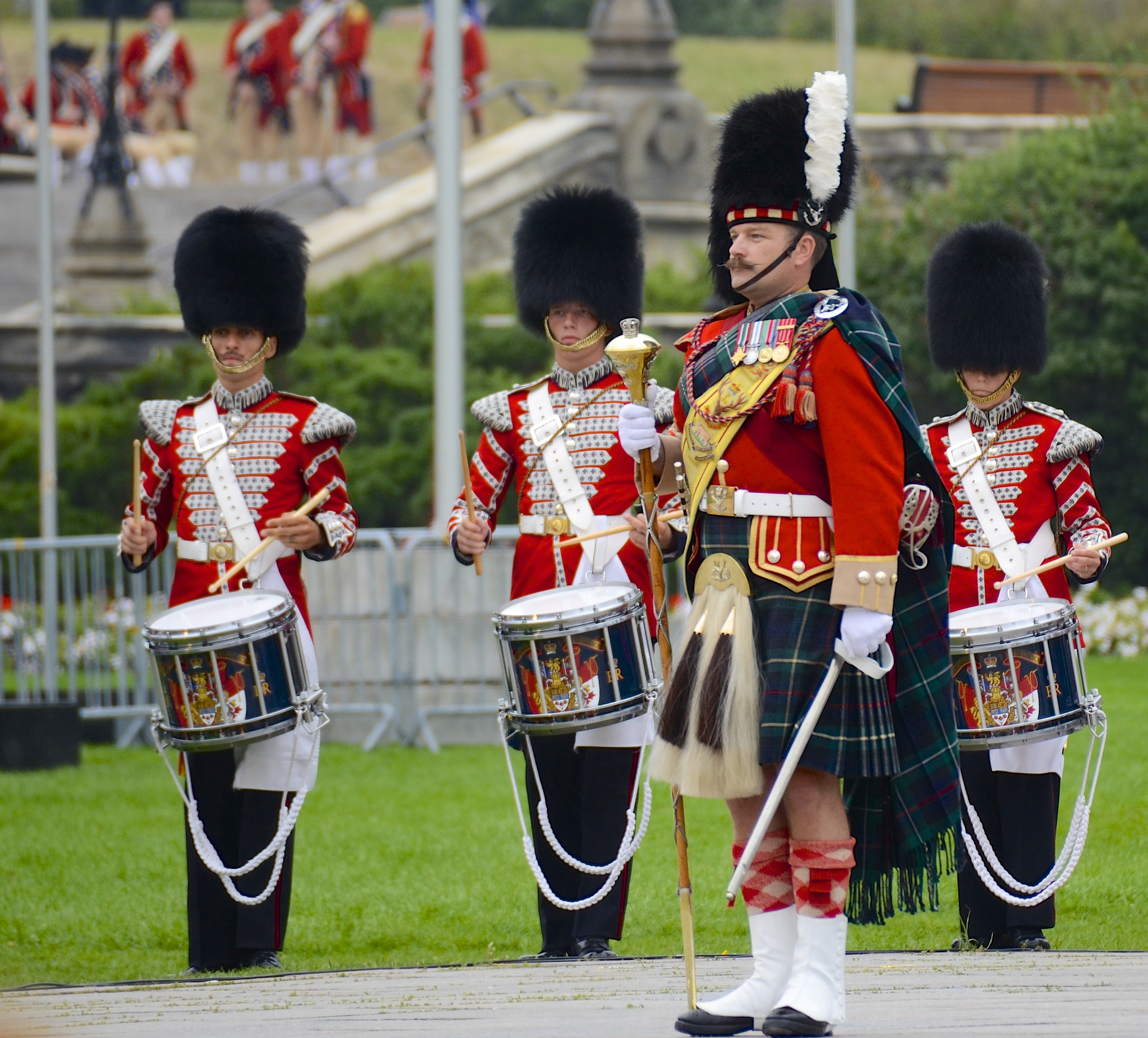
Band of the Ceremonial Guard at Fortissimo 2012

The Fortissimo Sunset Ceremony is an annual Canadian military music event held on the grounds of Parliament Hill in the Canadian capital of Ottawa.

The ceremony is a combination of the historical Beating Retreat event which originated in the United Kingdom, a regular military tattoo, and the lowering of the Canadian flag. The ceremony, which usually takes place on a July evening, is organized by the Ceremonial Guard, whose bands are also the main event at the festival. The guard is an ad hoc unit formed for the summer months to attend various military functions and ceremonies. In previous years, foreign drill units have also taken part in the tattoo, including units such as the German Navy Silent Drill Team, the Band of America's Few, the Bermuda Regiment Band, the Old Guard Fife and Drum Corps and the 2nd Marine Aircraft Wing Band.
