= 2nd Marine Aircraft Wing Band =

USMC military unit band

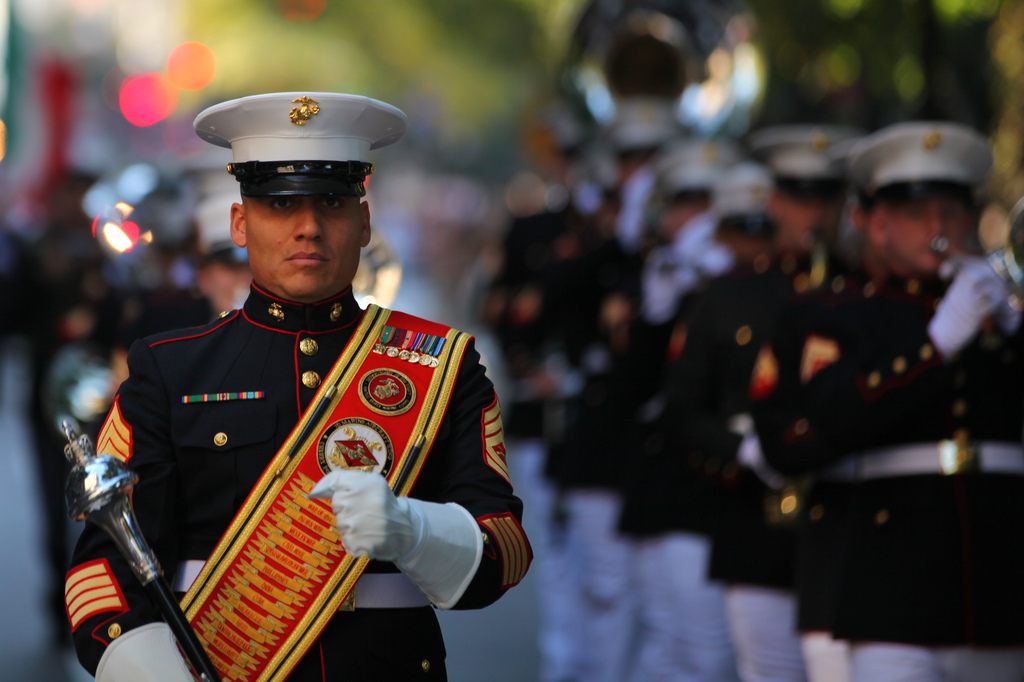
- The 2nd MAW Band marches down Fifth Avenue during the 2010 Columbus Day Parade.
- Active: 1941 – present
- Country: United States
- Branch: United States Marine Corps
- Type: Military Band
- Role: Musical Support; Public duties; Boosting esprit de corps; Community Engagement
- Part of: 2nd Marine Aircraft Wing
- Garrison/HQ: Marine Corps Air Station Cherry Point
- Nickname: 2nd MAW Band
- March: Marine Hymn (official hymn); Semper Fidelis (official march); Fight in Flight (official 2nd MAW march)
- Website: https://www.music.marines.mil/Bands/2nd-Marine-Aircraft-Wing-Band-North-Carolina/

Commanders
- Band Officer: Chief Warrant Officer 2 John F. Geary
- Enlisted Bandleader: Master Sergeant Jeremy A. Matt

The 2nd Marine Aircraft Wing Band is a United States Marine Corps Air-Ground Task Force regional military band located at Marine Corps Air Station Cherry Point. It performs at basic state functions, civilian ceremonies, and military parades in the region, presenting musical support and entertainment for unit/community events.

== History ==
The band was founded shortly after the aircraft wing was founded in July 1941. It took part in the opening of New Bern's Tryon Palace in April 1959. In 2007, the 2nd MAW Band was deployed to Iraq to support Multi-National Forces West by providing security at a tactical air control center for the remainder of the Iraq War. In 2013, the band took part in the Macy's Thanksgiving Day Parade as part of the East Coast Marine Corps Composite Band.

=== Honors ===
The band had Certificates of Commendation from the Commandant of the Marine Corps (Generals Robert E. Cushman Jr. in 1973 and Paul X. Kelley in 1985) given to them. Additionally, the band received Meritorious Unit Citations in 1972 and 1984 for excellence in the performance of duty.

== Ensembles and events ==
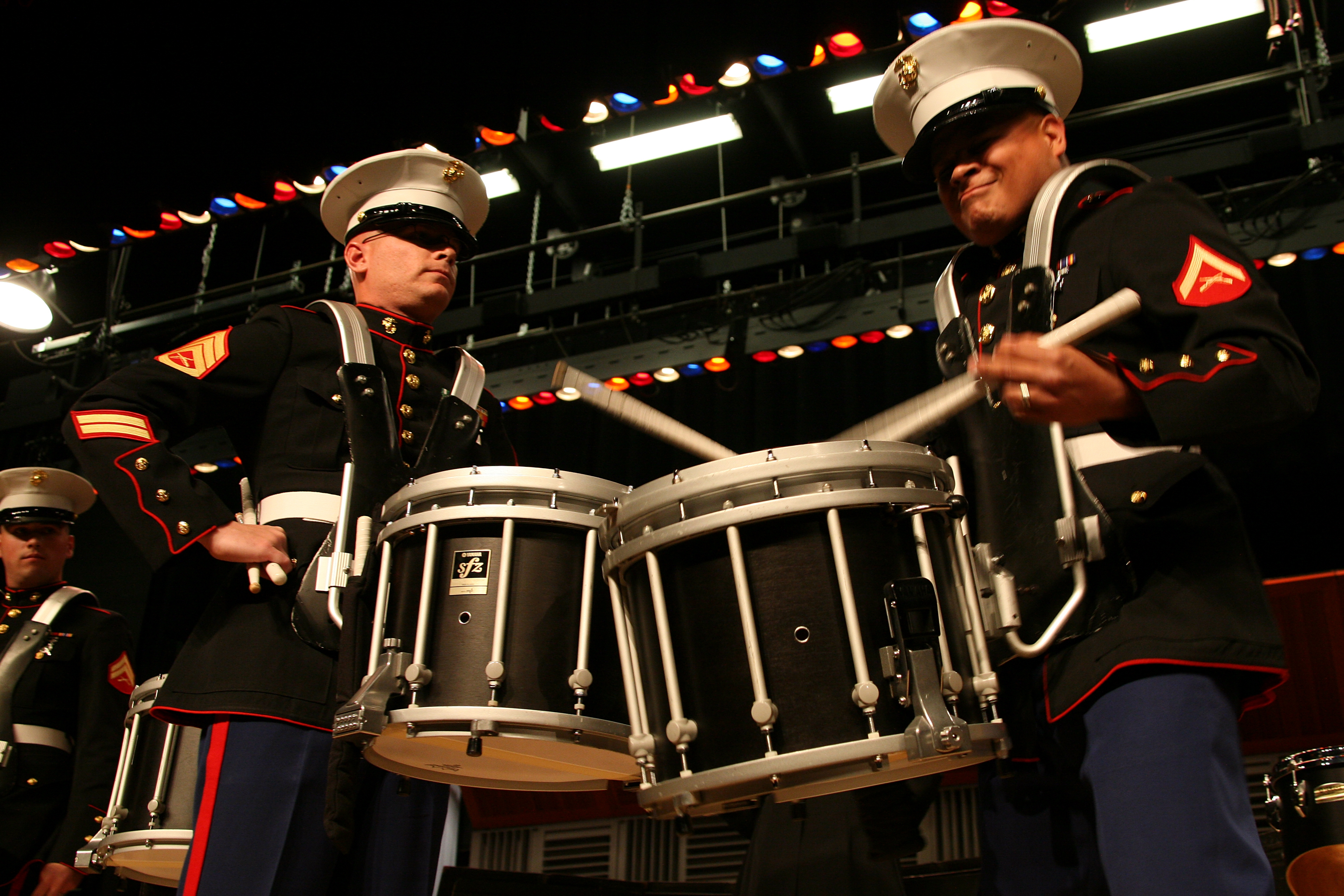
Two percussionists of the 2nd MAW Band performing at Uniondale High School.

The 42 members of the band are organized a range of unit ensembles:

- Ceremonial Marching Band
- Concert Band / Wind Ensemble
- Popular Music Group
- New Orleans Brass Band
- Jazz Combo
- Brass Quintet

All six of these ensembles play am important part in public relations for the band and the 2nd MAW Wing, traveling extensively throughout the eastern United States. It has made appearances many events such as the following:

- 4th of July Concerts and Parades in North Carolina
- 80th Anniversary of the Liberation of France (Lyon, France)
- Columbus Day Parade (New York City, New York) (Bridgeport, Connecticut)
- Coca-Cola 600
- Cotton Bowl
- Cleveland International Military Tattoo (Cleveland, Ohio)
- Fergus Scottish Festival and Highland Games (Ontario, Canada)
- Fleet Week (New York City, New York)
- Fort Macon State Park Centennial Celebration (Morehead City, North Carolina)
- Fortissimo Sunset Ceremony (Ottawa, Canada)
- Holiday Concerts and Parades in North Carolina
- Indy 500 (Indianapolis, Illinois)
- Kentucky Derby Festival (Louisville, Kentucky)
- International Marine Tattoo (Rochester, New York)
- Macy's Thanksgiving Day Parade (New York City, New York)
- Mardi Gras Parades (New Orleans, Louisiana)
- Marine Corps Recruiting Command Performances in Connecticut, Florida, Georgia, Iowa, Missouri, New York, North Carolina, Ohio, Tennessee, Virginia, West Virginia, and Wisconsin.
- Miss America Pageant Parade
- Memorial Day Parades (North Carolina)
- Memorial Ceremonies for the National September 11 Memorial & Museum and at the Firehouse, Engine Company 10 and Ladder Company 10 (New York City, New York)
- New York International Auto Show (New York City, New York)
- Pro Football Hall of Fame (Canton, Ohio)
- Sturgis Falls Celebration (Cedar Falls, Iowa)
- United States Marine Corps Marine Week Nashville, Tennessee
- United States Marine Corps Marine Week Atlanta, Georgia
- Veterans Day Parades (North Carolina)

During one of their international visits, the band had the rare honor of performing for the Margrethe II of Denmark and Prince Edward, Earl of Wessex.

== Gallery ==
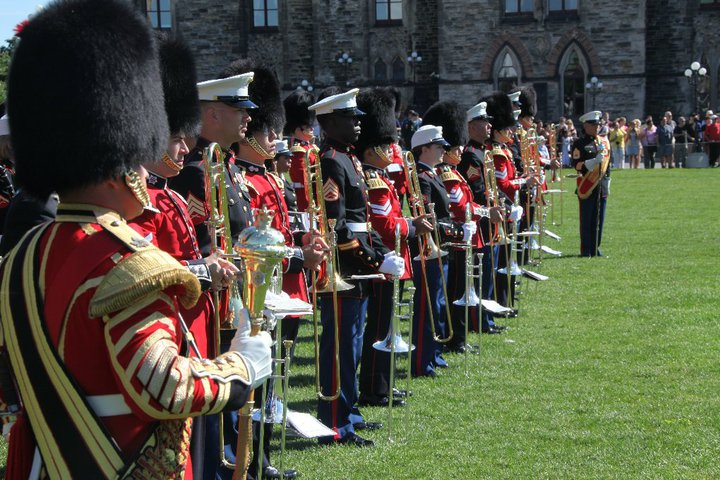
The 2nd MAW Band with members of the Band of the Ceremonial Guard at the Fortissimo Sunset Ceremony in the Canadian capital of Ottawa.

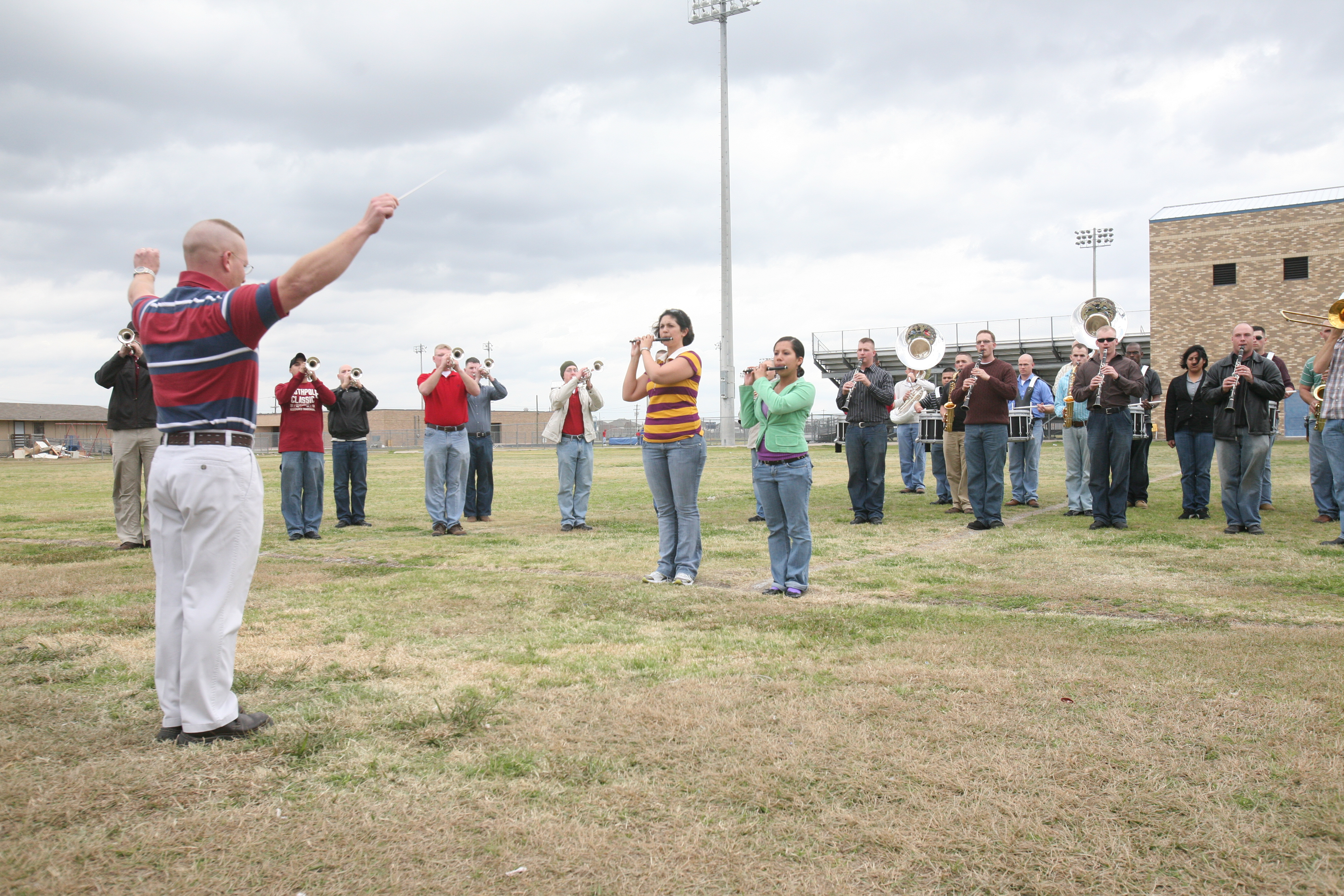
Chief Warrant Officer Ben Bartholomew, conducts the band during a rehearsal for the 8th Annual Martin Luther King Jr. Battle of the Bands.

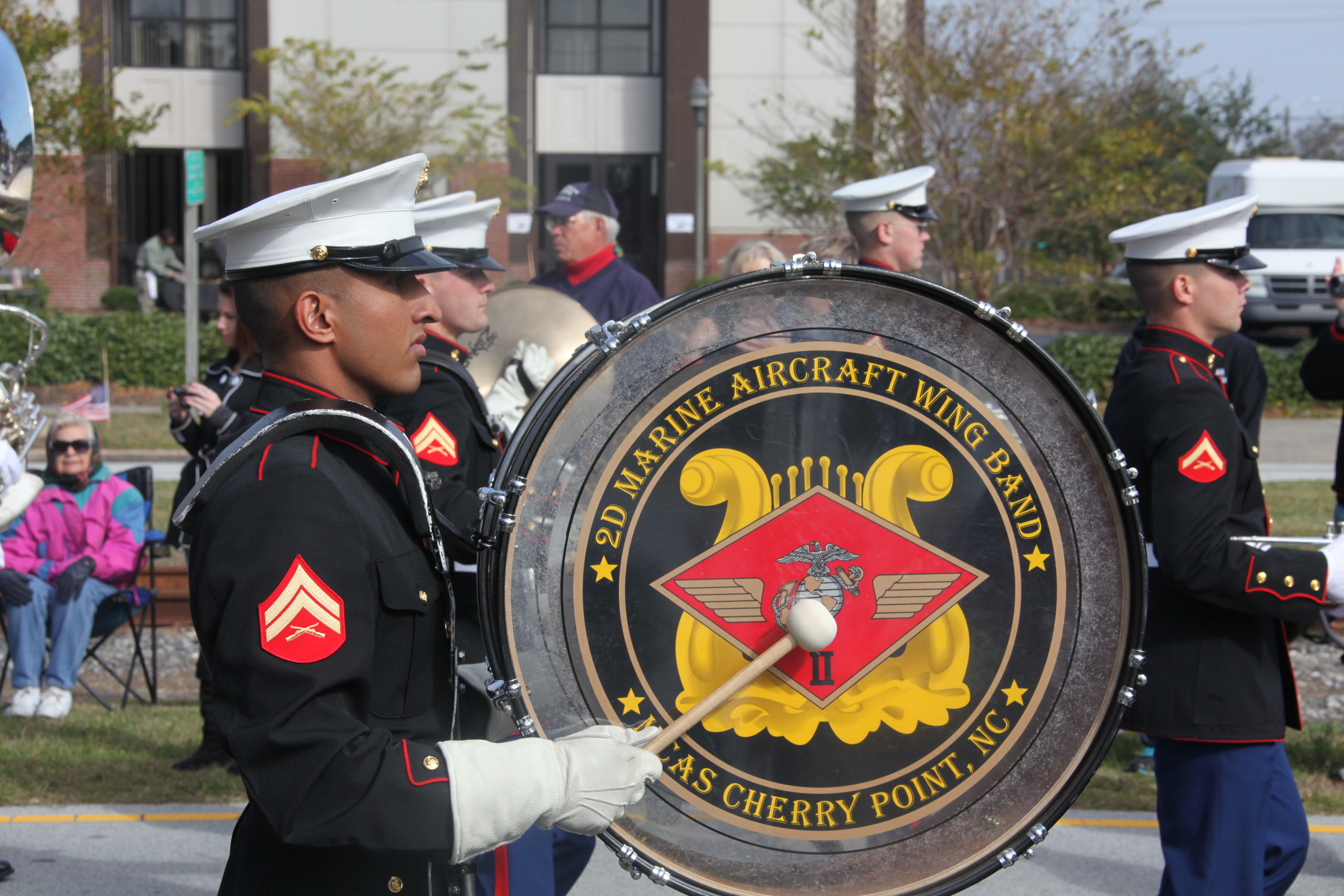
The 2nd MAW Band at the 2011 Morehead City Veterans Day Parade

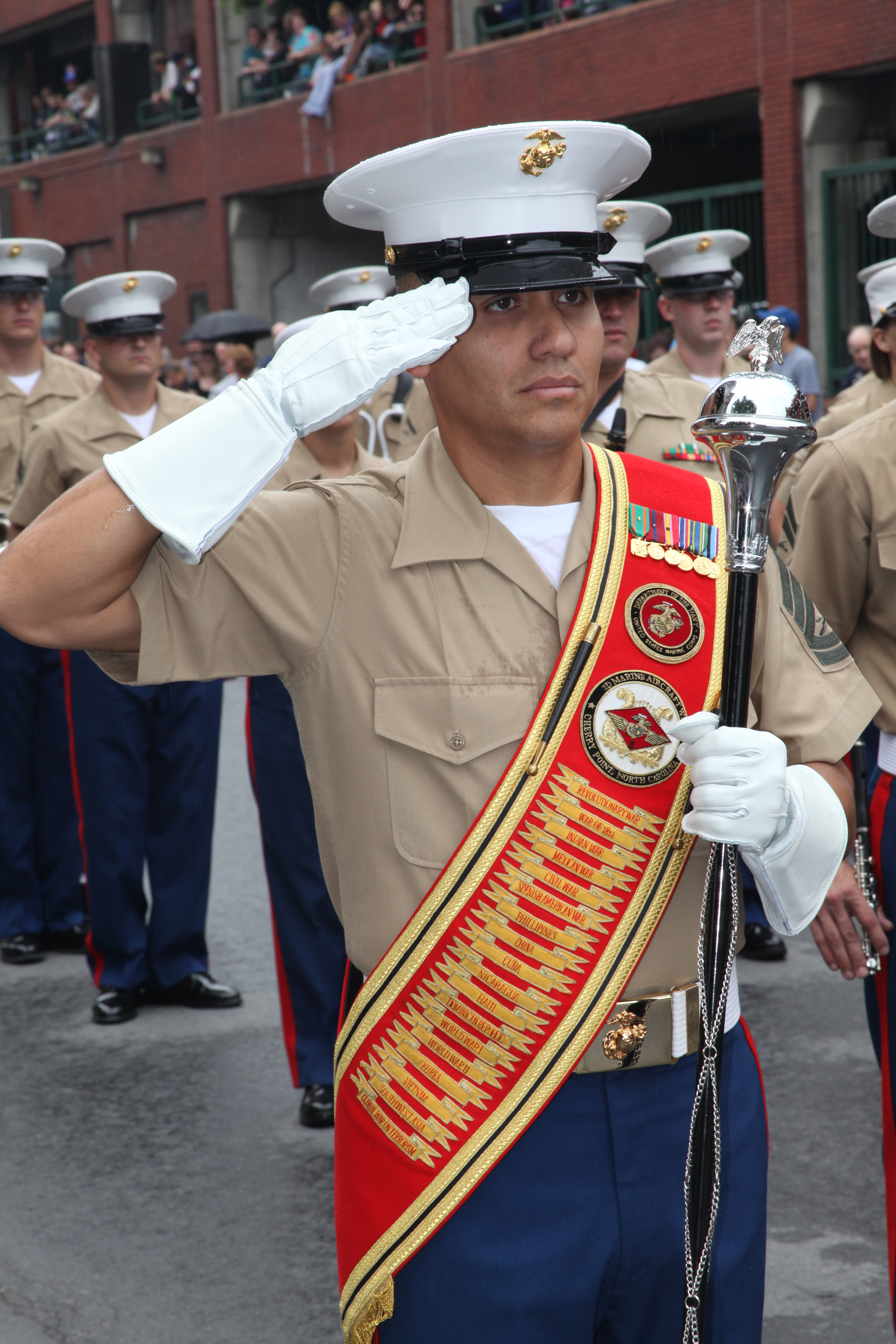
Gunnery Sergeant Victor Miranda, drum major for the 2nd MAW Band, salutes during the 32nd Annual Troy Flag Day Parade.

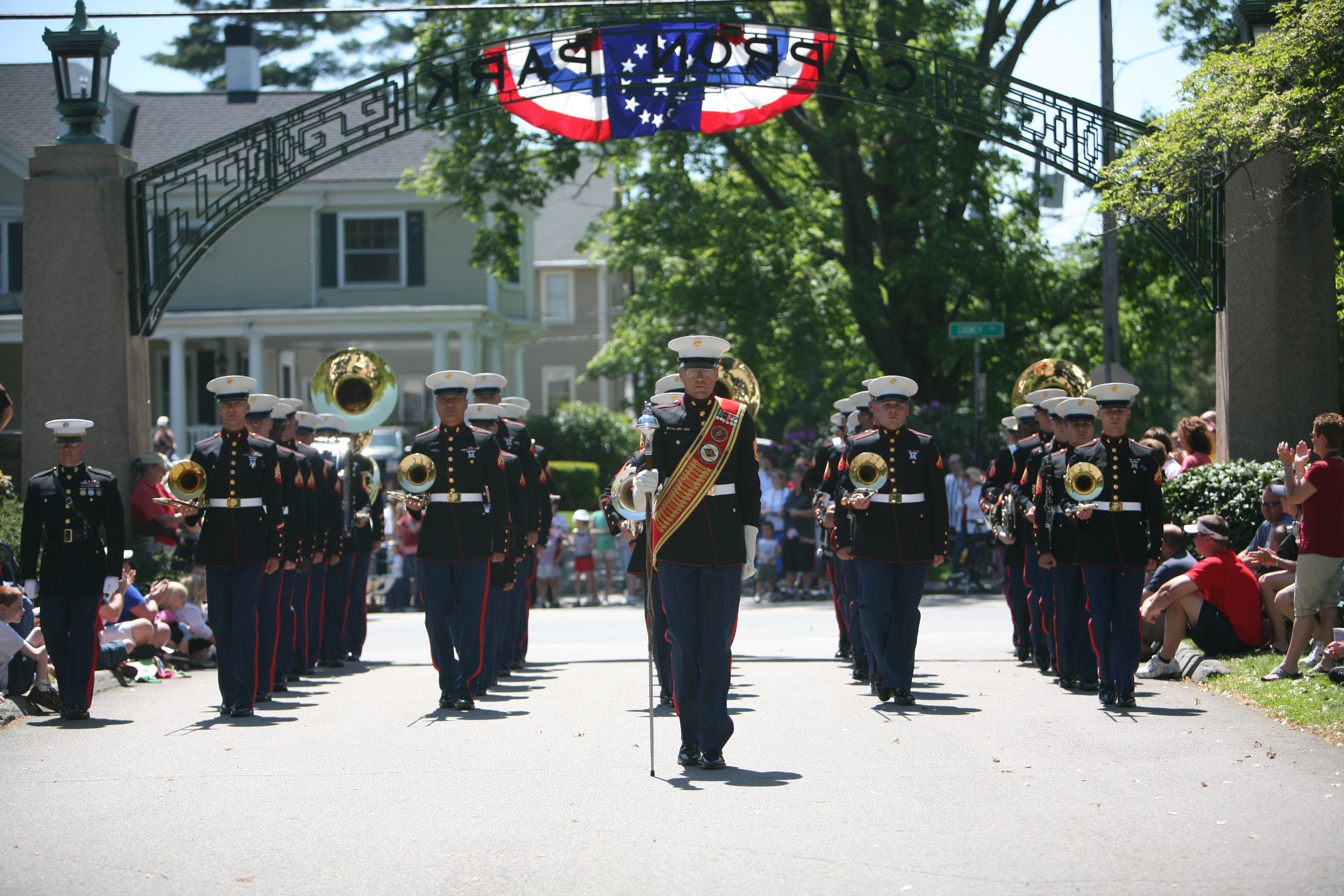
The 2nd MAW Band at Capron Park, Attleboro, Massachusetts.
