= Canadian Guards =

National household regiment in the Royal Canadian Infantry Corps

The Canadian Guards
- Regimental badge
- Active: 16 October 1953 – 6 July 1970
- Country: Canada
- Branch: Canadian Army 1953–1968, Force Mobile Command 1968–1970
- Type: Foot guards
- Role: Light infantry
- Size: Four battalions (1953–1957); Two battalions (1957–1968); One battalion (1968–1970)
- Part of: Royal Canadian Infantry Corps
- Garrison/HQ: Camp Petawawa (1st and 2nd Battalions and the Regimental Depot); Camp Valcartier (3rd Battalion); Camp Ipperwash (4th Battalion); Camp Borden (Regimental Band) 1953–1957
- Motto: A mari usque ad mare (Latin for 'from sea to sea')
- March: (Brass & Reed Band); Quick: "The Standard of St. George"; Slow: "From Sea to Sea"; March On: "Imperial Echoes"; March Off: "The Old Grey Mare"; March (On/Off) Colours: "Point of War; (Pipes and Drums); Advance in Review Order: "The Battle of the Somme"; March On: "Highland Laddie"; March Off: "Bonnie Dundee"; March (On/Off) Colours: "Point of War

Commanders
- Colonel-in-chief: Vacant
- Colonel of the Regiment: Major General R. Rowley

Insignia
- Plume: Red over white, left side of bearskin cap
- Tartan: Royal Stewart (pipes and drums)

The Canadian Guards (officially known as the Regiment of Canadian Guards) was an infantry regiment of the Canadian Army that served in the same role as the five regiments of foot guards in the British Army. The regiment was formed on 16 October 1953, by Lieutenant-general Guy Simonds, the chief of the general staff of the Canadian Army, with the redesignation of four separate battalions:

- 3rd Battalion, The Royal Canadian Regiment – 1st Battalion
- 3rd Battalion, Princess Patricia's Canadian Light Infantry – 2nd Battalion
- 1st Canadian Infantry Battalion – 3rd Battalion
- 2nd Canadian Infantry Battalion – 4th Battalion

On 25 November 1953, the following reserve units affiliated with the Canadian Guards but remained separate regiments (see § Affiliations):

- The Governor General's Foot Guards – 5th Battalion
- The Canadian Grenadier Guards – 6th Battalion

The Canadian Guards not only served as the Household Troops of Canada, but was also the country's first national military regiment. The regiment was reduced to nil strength and assigned to the supplementary order of battle in 1970.

== History ==
The regiment was created when it was decided that the composite 1st and 2nd Canadian Infantry Battalions that were created for the 27th Canadian Infantry Brigade should not be given a specific territorial identity. The Guards would be able to recruit nationally, and Lieutenant General Guy Simonds, said there was nothing wrong with infusing the standard of the Household Brigade into the Canadian Army. Despite political divisions in the government over the concept, the plan received support from the Royal House with the Queen writing to Simonds on 19 October 1954 and counselling him to "not allow any criticism of this sort to depress you unduly." Several weeks later, reserve or militia affiliations were added, when the Governor General's Foot Guards and Canadian Grenadier Guards were designated the 5th and 6th Battalions. Despite the battalion numbers, they remained distinct regiments (see § Affiliations).

The 3rd and 4th Battalions were disbanded on 31 March 1957 to make way for the formation of Regular Army armoured regiments, the 8th Canadian Hussars (Princess Louise's) and The Fort Garry Horse, leaving the 1st and 2nd Battalions and the Regimental Depot in the Regular Force. In October 1957, the 1st Battalion received its first Colours, while the 2nd Battalion was deployed to Germany as part of 4 CIBG. Two years later, the 1st Battalion replaced the 2nd Battalion, with the 2nd Battalion receiving its colours in 1960. In the late 1960s, as part of a reorganization of the Canadian Army, it was decided to disband The Canadian Guards. The 1st Battalion was disbanded on 1 October 1968, and the 2nd Battalion reduced to nil strength on 6 July 1970 (its personnel and equipment going to the new 3rd Battalion, The Royal Canadian Regiment). On 6 June 1970, a final Trooping the Colour parade in front of Governor General Roland Michener took place on Parliament Hill. The role of Household Troops then reverted to the two surviving militia units, which resumed their separate identities in 1976. Some regular members were reassigned to The Canadian Airborne Regiment.

Regimental colour of the 1st Battalion, The Canadian Guards

The camp flag of The Canadian Guards

== Former commanding officers and senior appointments ==
1st Battalion commanding officers
Name	Appointed on	Appointment completed on	Time served in role
Lt. Col K. L. Campbell OBE CD	April 15, 1954	January 8, 1955	8 months and 24 days.
Lt. Col W. E. Garber CD	January 9, 1955	September 5, 1958	3 years, 7 months and 27 days.
Lt. Col R. S. Graham CD	September 6, 1958	August 14, 1961	2 years, 11 months and 8 days.
Lt. Col. H. W. Mulherin GM CD	August 15, 1961	July 16, 1965	3 years, 11 months and 1 day.
Lt. Col J. G. W. Haynes CD	July 17, 1965	Unknown	Unknown

1st Battalion senior majors
Name	Appointed on	Appointment completed on	Time served in role
Maj. A. D. Egan CD	April 15, 1954	June 6, 1955	1 year, 1 month and 22 days
Maj. W.F. Bates CD	June 7, 1955	October 31, 1955	4 months and 24 days
Maj. P. A. Mayer MBE CD	November 1, 1955	September 19, 1956	10 months and 18 days
Maj. D. H. Cunningham, CD	September 20, 1956	August 25, 1957	11 months and 5 days
Maj. L. G. Smith, CD	August 26, 1957	January 4, 1959	1 year, 4 months and 9 days
Maj. H. W. Mulherin GM CD	January 5, 1959	August 14, 1961	2 years, 7 months and 9 days
Maj. B. B. Hart CD	August 15, 1961	February 11, 1962	5 months and 27 days
Maj. W. Remple CD	February 12, 1962	October 12, 1964	2 years and 8 months
Maj. J. M. M. Pryde CD	October 13, 1964	Unknown	Unknown

== Controversy ==
At the time, the regiment was criticized for being irrelevant and a show unit. Lieutenant Colonel J. Thomas Bowie, an 83-year-old veteran of the foot guards, claimed that the guards "have no history, no tradition, no nothing." At a 1952 convention of the Royal Canadian Legion, the guards were branded as "an affront and disgrace". Julian Ferguson, a Member of the House of Commons for Simcoe North as well as a World War I recipient of the Military Cross, attacked the Guards as having "never fought and never defeated". He then shook his finger at the then Minister of National Defence Brooke Claxton, and exclaimed "Shame on you!". Colonel Strome Galloway, who commanded the Guards' 4th Battalion from 1955 to 1957 and was the first and last regimental lieutenant-colonel, believed that the disbanding of the Guards was a "political decision" by powerful "francophone" elements. "Our crime," Galloway wrote, "was that we were 'too British' in uniform and character to pass muster with the Francophone hierarchy which dominated the Defence Department at the time. The Unification program was the official excuse, but the program itself was partly a gimmick to 'Americanize' the Canadian forces and eliminate, as far as possible, the British traditions of the past."

== Characteristics and duties ==
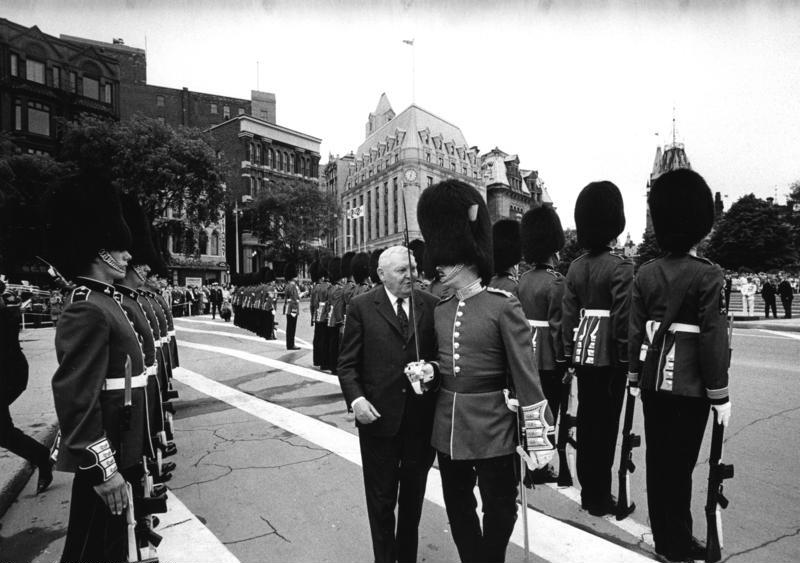
A guard of honour provided by the 1st Battalion, Canadian Guards, during the visit of West German Chancellor Ludwig Erhard to Ottawa in 1964.

The regiment was originally raised to be similar to the five regiments of the British Foot Guards: the Grenadier Guards, Coldstream Guards, Scots Guards, Irish Guards and Welsh Guards. The Canadian Guards wore a white-over-red plume on the left side of their bearskins. Ceremonial dress uniform was similar to that worn by the Canadian Grenadier Guards, with the Canadian version of the "Home Service" Dress tunic being worn in the summer and Atholl-grey greatcoats authorized for wear in the autumn and winter. The standard service rifle for the guards was the C1A1 (self-loading rifle). Its cap badge is a star that has ten points to symbolize the ten provinces of Canada. The maple leaves are based the royal arms of Canada, with the colour changed from red to gold.

The most prominent role of the 1st Battalion was the performance of public duties in the Ottawa-Gatineau region while operationally it performed the role of light infantry. The regiment pioneered what is now the changing of the Ceremonial Guard in Ottawa, with the first such ceremony to take place in the country being performed by the regiment on Dominion Day in 1959 when the 1st Battalion mounted the new guard on Parliament Hill with its band and corps of drums. It also provided honour guards for the Opening of the Canadian parliament and sentries for guard duty at Rideau Hall. In September 1959, the regiment's 1st Battalion gave the royal salute following the proceedings of the swearing in of Georges Vanier as Governor General of Canada. It provided most of the guards of honour for visiting heads of state, including Elizabeth II, Queen of Canada, Emperor Haile Selassie of Ethiopia, and US President John F. Kennedy. On 15 February 1965, the guards provided the guard of honour for an official ceremony held on the unveiling of the current flag of Canada. Toronto Mayor Philip Givens inspected a guard of honour of the guards at the Toronto City Hall after the battalion returned from Cyprus in 1965. In 1969, these duties were transferred onto the Public Duties Detachment.

=== Bands ===
Military Band

Throughout their existence the regular components of The Canadian Guards maintained a regimental band as well as pipes and drums. Known officially as the Band of Her Majesty's Canadian Guards, it was created on 22 April 1954 as a redesignation from the 1st Canadian Infantry Battalion Band and was disbanded on 30 September 1968. The band was based at Camp Borden from 1953 to 1957 and after which it was transferred to Petawawa where it stayed until the 1970s. Bandsmen were recruited from other Canadian military bands as well as bands from the United Kingdom and the Netherlands. One of the major events the band took part in was the Canadian Armed Forces Tattoo 1967 for Canada's centennial celebrations that year.

Pipe Band

Two pipe bands were to be formed in the regiment, with the 2nd and 4th battalions, although the latter battalion was disbanded in 1957. In common with the pipes and drums of the Scots Guards in the British Army, pipers of The Canadian Guards were granted the privilege of wearing the personal tartan of the Monarch – the Royal Stuart tartan. The 2nd Battalion band was formed in February 1954 under Pipe Major Archie Cairns and accompanied the battalion during its tour of duty in West Germany from 1957 to 1959. Although initially having few active pipers, Pipe Major Cairns grew the band to a high standard with the band playing at the Canadian National Exhibition in 1956. The Regimental pipe band was based at Camp Petawawa and undertook many high profile public duties, including the daily Changing of the Guard Ceremony on Parliament Hill. The Canadian Guards Pipes and Drums had a high profile, appearing at hundreds of music festivals, military tattoos, parades and other public events in both North America and Europe. After Pipe Major Cairns' departure from the band in 1964, he was succeeded by Willie Stirling (formerly of the Seaforth Highlanders) and later by John Huggan. As part of reorganisation during the Unification of the Canadian Forces, the Canadian Guards were disbanded with the 2nd Battalion (with pipe band) transforming to become the 3rd Battalion, The Royal Canadian Regiment In 1970.

== Affiliations ==
In the Canadian Forces, units may make formal, official links between each other called affiliations. These affiliations are "to foster continuous fraternal connections between military organizations beyond the close, professional relationships which are always encouraged." The two Reserve Force foot guard regiments, the Governor General's Foot Guards (GGFG) and the Canadian Grenadier Guards (CGG), were affiliated with the Canadian Guards, and from 1954 to 1976 they used Canadian Guards battalion numbers in token of the affiliation. Despite the battalion numbers, the GGFG and the CGG were considered separate regiments from the Canadian Guards. The affiliations automatically ceased when the Canadian Guards were put on the Supplementary Order of Battle in 1970.

- Governor General's Foot Guards (5th Battalion, The Canadian Guards)
- The Canadian Grenadier Guards (6th Battalion, The Canadian Guards)

== Deployments ==
- Korea 1953–1954
  - 1st Battalion (3rd Battalion, The Royal Canadian Regiment) 1953-1954
  - 2nd Battalion (3rd Battalion Princess Patricia's Canadian Light Infantry)
- West Germany 1957–1962 – NATO assignment
- Cyprus 1964–1965 – UN mission

== Notable members ==
- Colonel Strome Galloway, last Colonel of the Regiment
- James Gayfer, Director of Music of the Canadian Guards Band from 1954–1961.
- Lieutenant Colonel Ronald Cheriton, CO of the 2nd Battalion, Canadian Guards
- Charles Adams, Director of Music of the Canadian Guards Band from 1966–1968
- Clifford Pierce, father of Toronto Sun sports editor Bill Pierce.
- Ian Turnbull, principal percussionist with the Band of H.M. Canadian Guards and later on with the Band of the Royal Canadian Regiment.
- RSM John James Thomas, regimental sergeant major in the regiment beginning in September 1954.

== Guards Association ==
The Canadian Guards Association was founded in October 1969 with regimental sergeant major Jim Baird elected as its first president. It carried out the traditions of the regiment and included a group of 100 soldiers from all ranks. Its headquarters was in Ottawa and was the parent organization for other branches established in Petawawa, Picton, and Oromocto. In 2018, with the 65th anniversary of the unit's founding approaching, it was announced that a final reunion would take place at Garrison Petawawa from 12 to 14 October. The decision was made due to the age range of members and the board of directors, averaging at around 80. At the reunion, the association signing a memorandum of understanding with the 3rd Battalion, The Royal Canadian Regiment that saw them act as custodians of the Guards collection. The Canadian Guards Memorial at the garrison was also rededicated during the ceremony.

== See also ==
- Household Brigade
- Brigade of Guards
- Ceremonial Guard
- Musical Ride
