= Bélanger =

Bélanger is a French surname, popular in Canada. Notable people with the name include:

== A-F ==
- Alain Bélanger (born 1956), Canadian ice hockey player
- Alexis Bélanger (1808–1868), Roman Catholic priest and missionary
- Amable Bélanger (1846–1919), Canadian iron founder, industrialist and community leader
- Aurélien Bélanger (1878–1953), Ontario political figure
- Buckley Belanger (born 1960), Canadian provincial politician
- Charley Belanger (1901–1970), Canadian boxer
- Cody Belanger, American politician
- Daniel Bélanger (born 1961), Canadian singer-songwriter
- Denis Bélanger (born 1964), Canadian vocalist and lyricist
- Dina Bélanger (1897–1929), Canadian religious figure and musician
- Edwin Bélanger (1910–2005), Canadian conductor, violinist, violist, arranger, and music educator
- Éric Bélanger (born 1977), Canadian ice hockey player
- Francis Bélanger (born 1978), Canadian ice hockey player
- François-Joseph Bélanger (1744–1818), French architect and decorator
- François-Xavier Bélanger (1833–1882), French-Canadian naturalist and museum curator

== G-L ==
- Geneviève Bélanger (born 1987), Canadian synchronized swimmer
- Gérard Bélanger (born 1940), Canadian economics professor
- Grégoire Bélanger (1889–1957), Canadian politician of Quebec
- Guy Bélanger (born 1946), Canadian tenor, opera director, composer, and conductor
- Guy Bélanger (politician) (born 1942), Canadian member of the National Assembly of Quebec
- Horace Bélanger (1836–1892), Lower Canadian fur trader
- Hugo Bélanger (born 1970), Canadian ice hockey left wing
- Jean Bélanger (1782–1827), notary and political figure in Lower Canada
- Jean-Baptiste-Charles-Joseph Bélanger (1790–1874), French applied mathematician
- Jeff Belanger (born 1974), American author, public speaker and paranormal investigator
- Jesse Bélanger (born 1969), Canadian ice hockey centre
- Jim Belanger, Canadian politician
- John Belanger (born c. 1949), Canadian Paralympic athlete
- Josée Bélanger (born 1986), Canadian soccer player
- Joseph Albert Bélanger (1922–2005), Ontario dairy farmer and political figure
- Karl Bélanger (born 1975), Canadian political consultant
- Ken Belanger (born 1974), Canadian ice hockey forward
- Louis Bélanger (born 1964), Canadian film director and screenwriter
- Louis-Philippe-Antoine Bélanger (1907–1989) was a Canadian politician
- Luc Bélanger (born 1975), Canadian ice hockey goaltender

== M-Y ==
- Madeleine Bélanger (born 1932), Canadian politician from Quebec
- Marc Bélanger (disambiguation), multiple people
- Marcel Bélanger (1920–2013), Canadian academic
- Mark Belanger (1944–1998), American baseball shortstop
- Maurice Bélanger (1912–1964), Canadian politician
- Mauril Bélanger (1955–2016), Canadian politician
- Michel Bélanger (1929–1997), Canadian businessman and banker
- Michelle Belanger, American author, singer and advocate for the vampire community
- Nancy Bélanger (born 1978), Canadian curler
- Pierre Bélanger (born 1960), Canadian lawyer and politician
- Richard Bélanger, Canadian city councillor
- Roger Belanger (1965–2011), Canadian ice hockey player
- Ronald J. Belanger (1939–2017), American politician
- Serge Bélanger, Canadian politician in Montreal, Quebec
- Sylvie Bélanger (1951–2020), Canadian interdisciplinary artist using sound, video, photography and installation
- Tammy Belanger (born 1976), American child who disappeared in 1984
- Terry Belanger (born 1941), American librarian and professor
- William V. Belanger Jr. (1928–2018), American politician and businessman
- Yves Bélanger (disambiguation), multiple people

== See also ==
- Bellanger
