= Kleztory =

Canadian klezmer and world music band

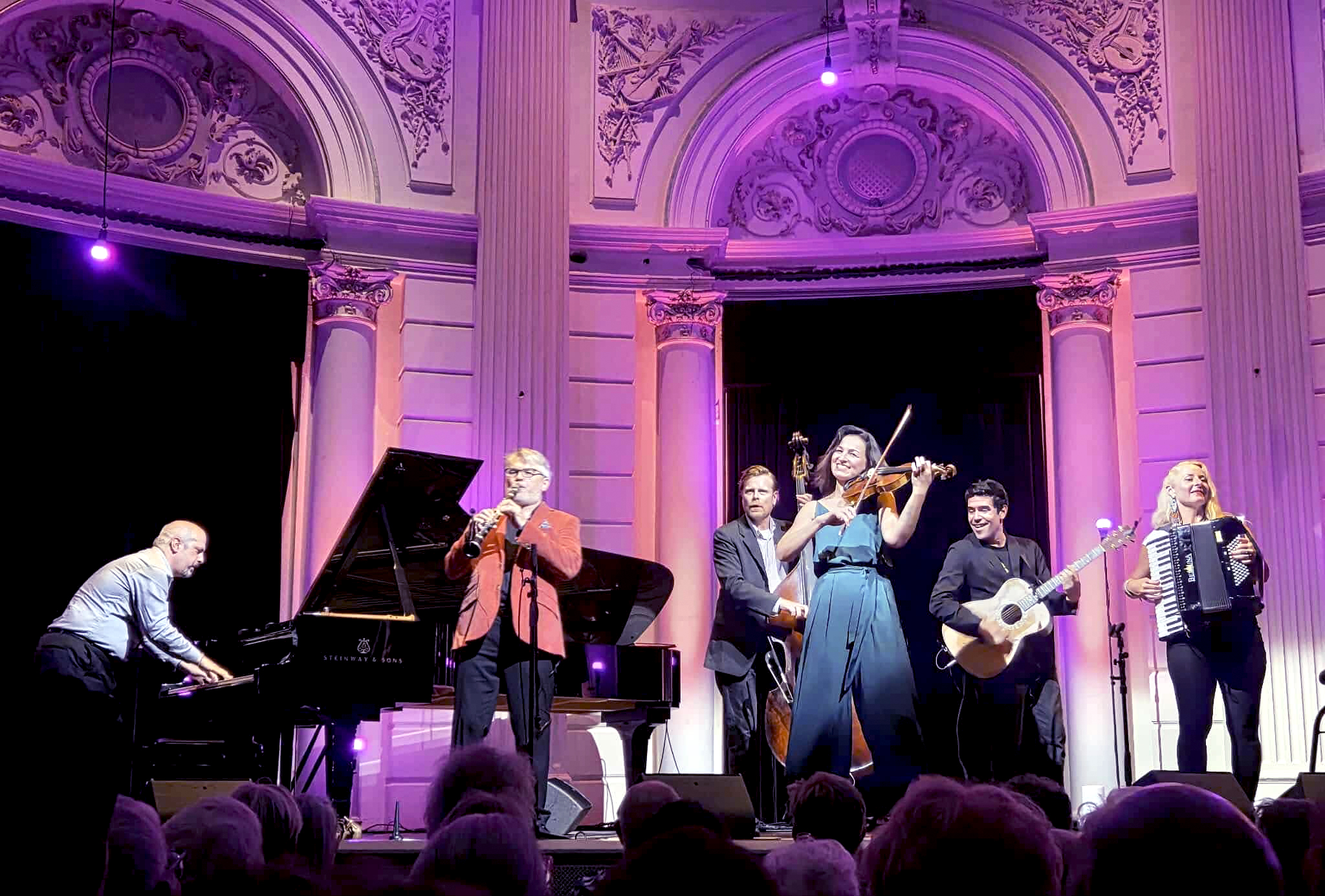
- The klezmer ensemble Kleztory during their performance at the Concertgebouw in Amsterdam, July 2025.

Background information
- Origin: Canada, Montreal
- Genres: Klezmer, World music
- Years active: 2000–present
- Members: Airat Ichmouratov, Elvira Misbakhova, Raphaël D'Amours, Mark Peetsma, Melanie Bergeron, David Ryshpan
- Past members: Alain Legault, Henri Oppenheim, Alexandru Sura, Dany Nicolas
- Website: www.kleztory.com

Kleztory is a klezmer and world music ensemble founded in 2000 and based in Montreal, Quebec, Canada. While remaining respectful of the rich heritage of klezmer, Kleztory takes the liberty of arranging parts of the traditional repertoire. This gives their music their own personal uniqueness and flavor. Kleztory is influenced by many sources of inspiration including jazz, classical, gypsy, country, folk, and blues. The ensemble were awarded both the Opus Prize in 2007 as the best Jazz / World Music album of the year in Québec for Nomade, and the Fürth Klezmer Prize at the 3rd International Jewish Music Festival in Amsterdam in 2012.

== Personnel ==
Current members include Elvira Misbakhova (violin), Airat Ichmouratov (clarinet, bass clarinet, duclar), Mark Peetsma (double bass), Raphaël D'Amours (guitar), and Melanie Bergeron (accordion). Three of the original founding members remain in the group with Melanie Bergeron replacing Henri Oppenheim (accordion) and Raphaël D'Amours replacing guitarist Dany Nicolas and founding guitarist Alain Legault. During 2013–2014, Kleztory collaborated with Alexandru Sura (cimbalom). In 2022, jazz pianist and composer David Ryshpan joined the band.

== History ==
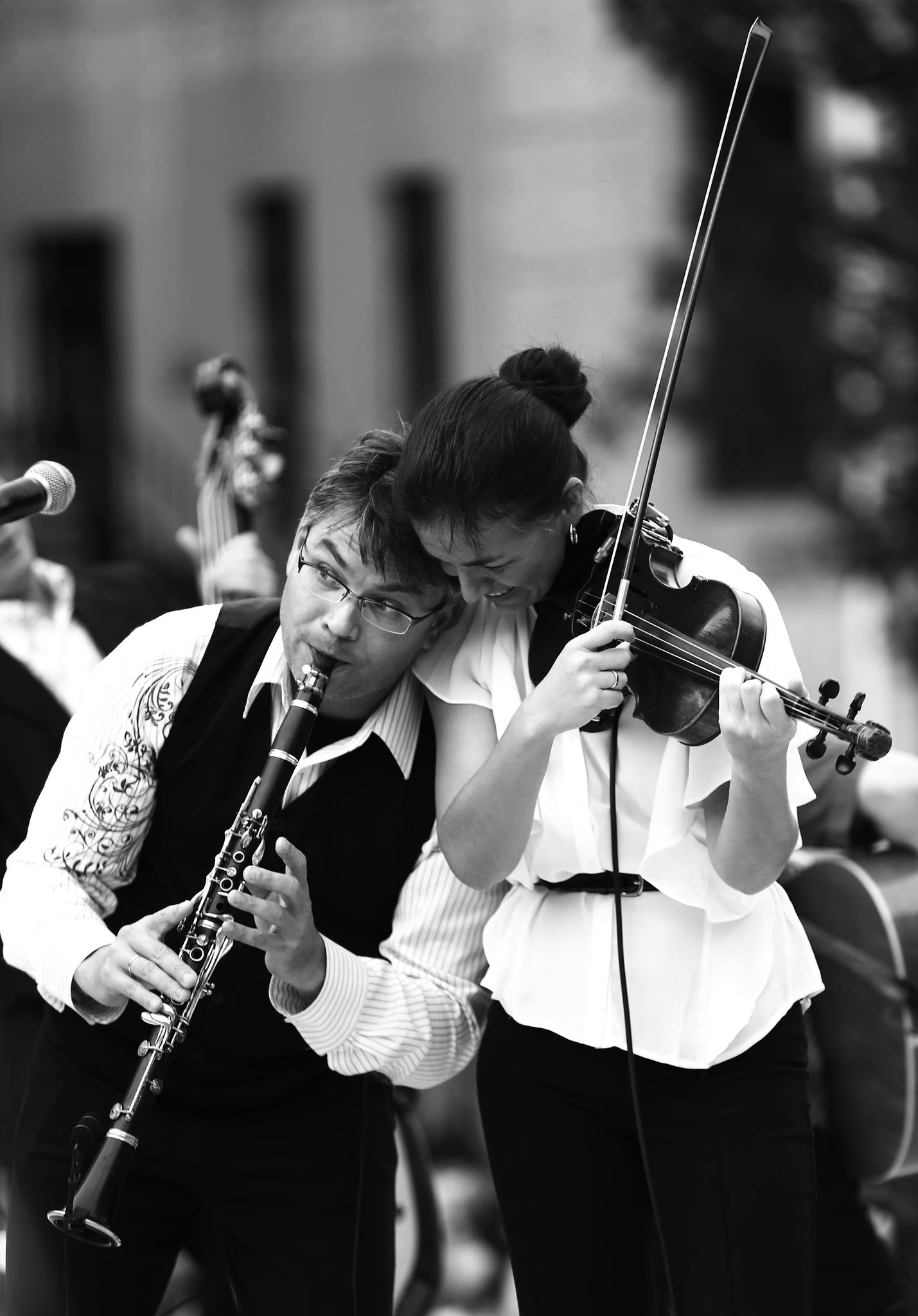
Airat Ichmouratov and Elvira Misbakhova during Kleztory's performance in Shanghai, China, August 2013

Kleztory has played in a wide variety of Montreal venues, and since their debut in 2000, they have performed numerous concerts worldwide including presentations in Canada, USA, Netherlands, Germany, Austria, Belgium, Hungary, Switzerland, Romania, Brazil, Mexico, Costa Rica, and China. In 2012, Kleztory was selected as the only Canadian participant to compete at the 3rd International Jewish Music Festival in Amsterdam and were successful in winning the Fürth Klezmer Prize and as result appeared at Furth Klezmer Festival (Germany) during the following spring. In October 2015, Kleztory was the only Canadian Artist selected to perform a showcase sponsored by Folquebec at Womex in Budapest, Hungary. Kleztory has appeared as the soloist with numerous orchestras including the Montreal Symphony Orchestra, Orchestre Métropolitain, the Orchestre Symphonique de Québec, I Musici de Montréal Chamber Orchestra, Les Violons du Roy, and Brussels Chamber Orchestra. Kleztory made an appearance at the Concertgebouw in Amsterdam, performing in the Kleine Zaal (Recital Hall) on 24 July 2025

== Recordings ==
Kleztory produced its first CD, entitled Kleztory – Musique Klezmer at the beginning of 2001. A few years later they recorded a second CD in collaboration with the I Musici de Montréal Chamber Orchestra, under the direction of Yuli Turovsky, which was then internationally distributed on the Chandos Records Label in the spring of 2004. In March 2007, they released a third CD called Nomade. This album won them an Opus Prize in 2007 as the best Jazz / World Music album of the year in Québec. In 2013, Kleztory launched new album Arrival which was nominated as Best album of the year in Traditional music category by ADISQ, complete with a new stage show.

== Discography ==
- 2001 - Kleztory – Musique Klezmer
- 2004 - Klezmer with Yuli Turovsky and I Musici de Montréal Chamber Orchestra (Chandos Records)
- 2007 - Nomade (Amerix)
- 2013 - Arrival (Amerix)
- 2017 - Nigun (Amerix)
- 2020 - Momentum (Chandos Records)
- 2023 - Meeting Point (Amerix)
- 2026 - Rendez-Vous (Amerix)

== Awards ==
- 2022 - winner of Opus Prize - The Best World Music album of the year in Québec for Momentum
- 2018 - winner of Opus Prize - The Best World Music Concert of the Year in Québec for Mundial Tour
- 2014 - nominated for ADISQ "Traditional Album of the Year" for Arrival
- 2012 - winner of the Fürth Klezmer Prize at the 3rd International Jewish Music Festival in Amsterdam
- 2007 - winner of Opus Prize in 2007 as the best Jazz / World Music album of the year in Québec for Nomade

== See also ==
- Secular Jewish music
- World music
