= Bernard Jean =

- Born: September 21, 1948; Jonquière, Quebec (now Saguenay, Quebec)
- Died: August 1, 2017 (aged 68); Montreal, Quebec, Canada
- Occupations: oboist, english horn player, conductor, and music educator

Bernard Jean (September 21, 1948 – August 1, 2017) was a Canadian oboist, english horn player, conductor, and music educator. He has held principal oboist positions with several important Canadian orchestras, including the Quebec Symphony Orchestra and the Montreal Symphony Orchestra. In 1972 he co-founded the Quebec Woodwind Quintet; a group he played and recorded with for the next 15 years. In 1987 he founded the St Louis de France Ensemble, a group which he has conducted and recorded works by Caplet, Constant, Milhaud, and Patch. He has also performed as a soloist with the National Arts Centre Orchestra among other notable ensembles. A graduate of the Conservatoire de Paris and the Conservatoire de musique du Québec à Québec, he has taught on the music faculties of Laval University (1972-1975) and Conservatoire de musique du Québec à Montréal (1975-present).
