= Elvira Misbakhova =

Elvira Misbakhova Эльвира Мисбахова
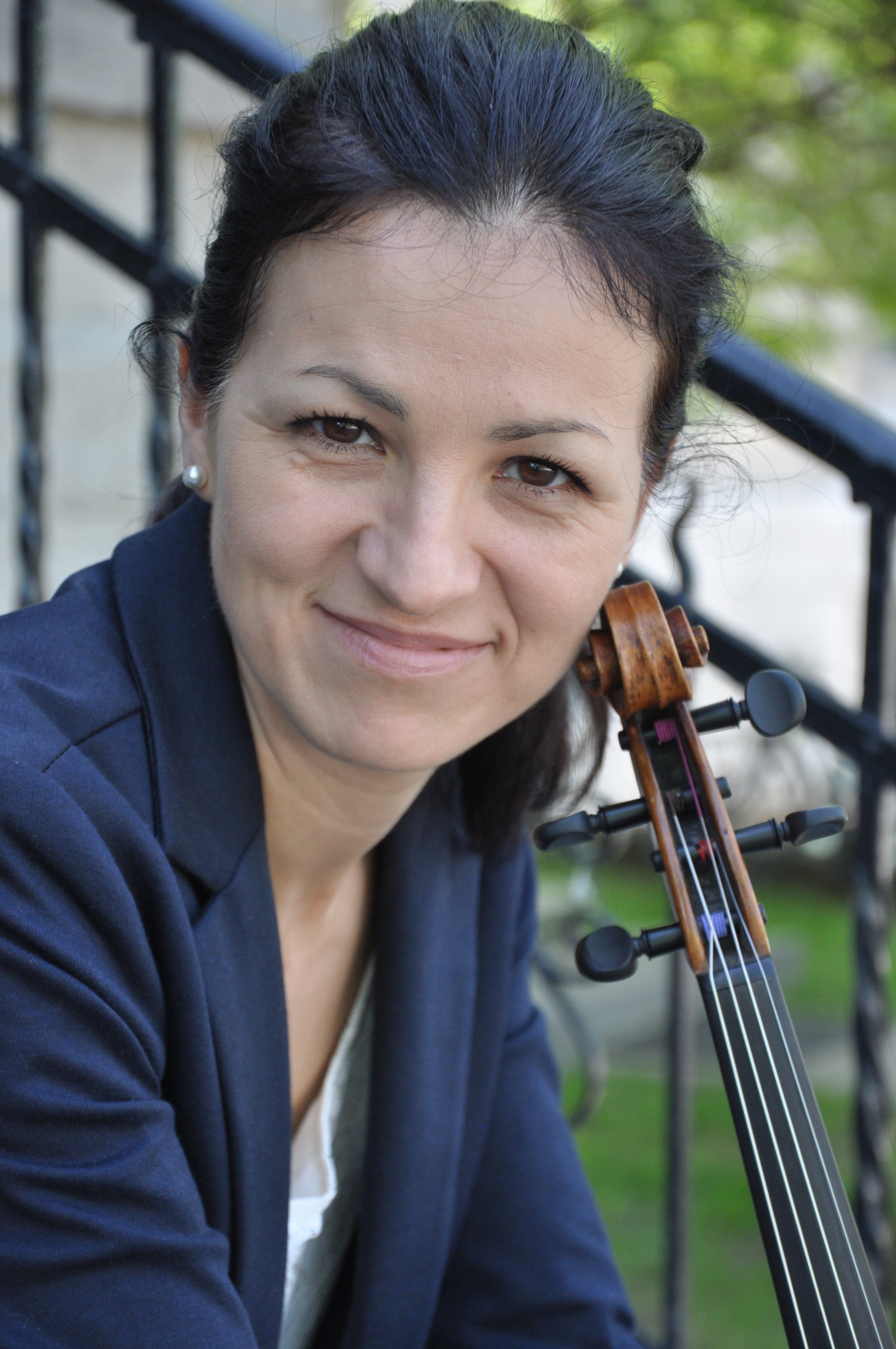
- Born: Elvira Rafailovna Misbakhova; 20 July 1975; Nizhnekamsk; Soviet Union
- Citizenship: Canada , Russia
- Education: Kazan State Conservatory
- Occupations: Violist, violinist,
- Years active: 1994–present

Elvira Rafailovna Misbakhova (Russian: Эльвира Рафаиловна Мисбахова, Tatar: Эльвира Рафаил кызы Мисбахова, romanized: Elwira Rafail qızı Misbaxowa; born July 20, 1975) is a Volga Tatar-born Russian / Canadian violist and violinist. Misbakhova is presently associate principal viola at the Orchestre Métropolitain of Montreal, Trois-Rivières Symphony Orchestra and the Longueuil Symphony Orchestra.

== Early life ==
Misbakhova was born and raised in Nizhnekamsk, in the Republic of Tatarstan, Russia. She is the second child of Rafail Misbakhov and Nurlybika Misbakhova (Saitova). Misbakhova studied violin at the Nizhnekamsk Music School N1, Nizhnekamsk Music College and Kazan Conservatory, graduating in 1999. In 1996, when she was appointed Associate Viola at Kazan Chamber Orchestra La Primavera, she began to tour extensively in Europe. In 1999, Misbakhova, following her husband Airat Ichmouratov, permanently moved to Montreal, Quebec, Canada, and participated as a student in the Orford Arts Centre Festival, where she met Yuli Turovsky, Soviet-born Canadian cellist and conductor, and his wife violinist Eleonora Turovsky, who later became Misbakhova's teacher.

== Career ==
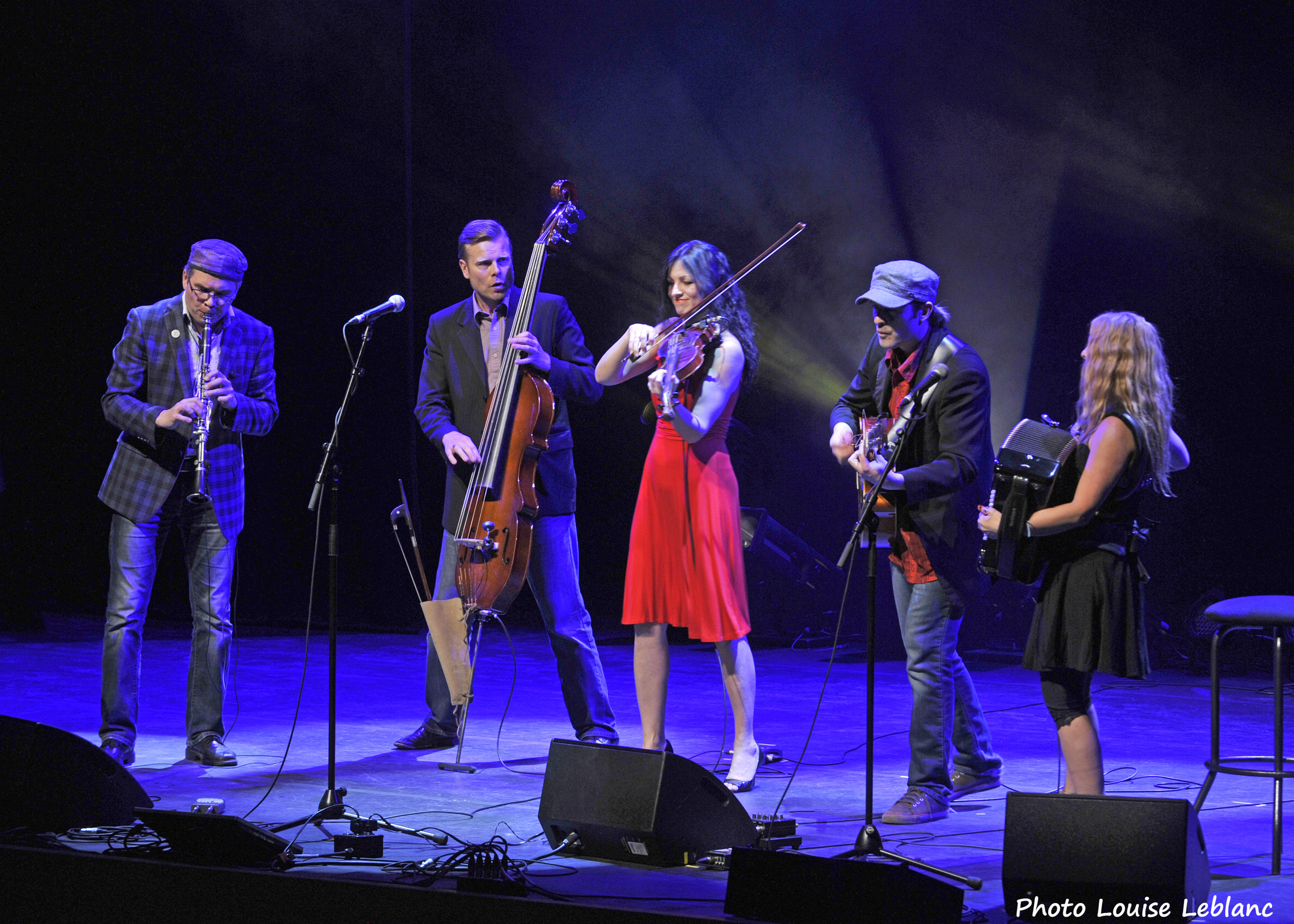
Kleztory at Rideau Showcase,18 February 2015, Quebec city, Canada

In 2000, Misbakhova joined the klezmer group Kleztory, in which she presently plays violin. In 2004, Kleztory recorded for the Chandos Records (Great Britain) CD with I Musici de Montréal Chamber Orchestra and Yuli Turovsky. In 2007, Kleztory's album Nomade won the Opus Prize. Their most recent (2014) album Arrival was nominated as Best album of the year in the Traditional music category by ADISQ. In 2012, Kleztory won klezmer Furth Prize at the International Klezmer Festival and Competition in Amsterdam and as a result appeared at the Furth Klezmer Festival during the following spring. With Kleztory, Elvira Misbakhova has appeared as soloist with several orchestras, including the Montreal Symphony Orchestra, the Quebec Symphony Orchestra, I Musici de Montréal Chamber Orchestra, Les Violons du Roy, and Brussels Chamber Orchestra and toured extensively in Canada, USA, Brazil, Mexico, Costa Rica, Germany, the Netherlands, Austria, Romania, and China.

As viola soloist, she has performed with I Musici de Montreal, the Orchestre Métropolitain, the University of Montreal Symphony Orchestra, the New Generation Chamber Orchestra, and the Multicultural Orchestra of Montreal, where she performed the Canadian premiere of Requiem "Holocaust" for viola and orchestra by Boris Pigovat. She has performed with the Orford Camerata and McGill Chamber Orchestras, the Bachakademie Symphony Orchestra in Stuttgart, Germany (2002), and in the Pacific Music Festival Orchestra in Sapporo, Japan (2002).

In 2013 Misbakhova founded the Turovsky String Quartet to honour the passionate and inspiring Yuli and Eleonora Turovsky. Together with violinists Anastasia Virlan, Robert Margaryan, and cellist Katherina Bragina, they continue to play at chamber music series and festivals in Montreal and throughout Quebec.

== Education ==
Elvira Misbakhova obtained her Master's degree (2001) and Doctorate degree (2006) in Interpretation (Viola) at University of Montreal, where she studied with Eleonora Turovsky.

== Personal life ==
Misbakhova is married to composer and conductor Airat Ichmouratov, and they have two daughters.
