= Calvin Sieb =

American-born Canadian classical violinist (1925–2007)

Calvin Sieb

Calvin Robert Sieb (30 May 1925 – 21 May 2007) was an American-born Canadian classical violinist who was the concertmaster of the Montreal Symphony Orchestra (1959/1960–79) and the Orchestre du Capitole de Toulouse (1979–89), and also played as a soloist. He was known as a "prominent" teacher of violin, teaching at the Conservatoire de musique du Québec à Québec (1951–56), the Conservatoire de musique du Québec à Montréal (1955–79) and the University of Ottawa (1989–2001). He played the Laub–Petschnikoff Stradivarius. He was a Chevalier of the Ordre des Arts et des Lettres of France (1990).

== Early life and education ==
Calvin Sieb was born in Newark, New Jersey, on 30 May 1925, to Augusta Adelaide (née Cyphers) and Robert George Sieb, who ran an electrical contracting business. His mother played the piano at an amateur level. He received violin lessons from the age of five. He attended New York College of Music (1938–43), the Juilliard School (1945–48) and Chatham Square School (1949–50), being taught by Hans Letz and the violist, Emanuel Vardi. In 1943–45 he was in the United States Army Air Forces. In 1950, he went to France where he was taught by the violinist Jacques Thibaud (1950–51), and also briefly studied composition and aesthetics with Nadia Boulanger at Fontainebleau's Conservatoire américain (1950).

== Career ==
His first orchestral position was as assistant conductor of the Quebec Symphony Orchestra (1951–53). He was the concertmaster (first violin) of the Canadian Broadcasting Corporation (CBC) Little Symphonies Orchestra (1954–58), the CBC Radio and Television Orchestra, the National Film Board of Canada Studio Orchestra, the Stratford Festival, the Montreal Symphony Orchestra (1959/1960–79) and the Orchestre du Capitole de Toulouse (1979–89). While in Toulouse, he also directed the Musicamerata of Toulouse, and in 1992, he founded the Ottawa Chamber Orchestra.

Sieb performed as a soloist with the CBC Little Symphonies Orchestra, and the Chamber Music Orchestra (1962), as well as at the Stratford Festival (1959) and the Pablo Casals Festival in Puerto Rico (1964–67). His first solo performance with the Montreal Symphony came in 1962, playing Saint-Saëns' Violin Concerto No. 3 with the conductor Charles Munch, and he subsequently played solos with that orchestra under various conductors, including Franz-Paul Decker, Charles Dutoit, Kyril Kondrashin and Zubin Mehta. Other major conductors with whom Sieb played as a soloist include Leonard Bernstein, Pierre Monteux, Eugene Ormandy, Malcolm Sargent and Georg Solti. Towards the end of his career, Sieb guest conducted and performed chamber music and concertos with Ottawa ensembles, such as Thirteen Strings. He frequently appeared in CBC broadcasts, both radio and television. His recordings include one in 1956 of the Canadian composer Rodolphe Mathieu's Quintet for piano and strings.

He is described as a "prominent teacher" in his obituary in The Ottawa Citizen. His notable students include Marc Bélanger, Lewis Furey and Kerson Leong. During his performing career in Canada, Sieb taught at the Conservatoire de musique du Québec à Québec (1951–56) and the Conservatoire de musique du Québec à Montréal (1955–79), where he held the rank of full professor. After returning from France, he served as professor of violin at the University of Ottawa (1989–2001), where he is credited with improving standards. During his retirement, he taught at the Conservatoire de musique of Gatineau, Quebec, and continued to perform locally and give masterclasses until the end of his life. He served on the advisory committee of the Montreal International Competition (1966–79) and was on the jury of the Enesco International Competition, Bucharest (1970).

At the Montreal Symphony, Sieb played the 1727 Laub–Petschnikoff Stradivarius loaned by The Montreal Star to the orchestra in 1961; he later purchased the instrument, which was estimated to be worth $500,000 in 1984. He also owned a viola by François Le Jeune, dating from 1754. He invented two violin accessories: a chin rest and the Finissima artist mute, a plastic sliding mute, adopted by Isaac Stern.

== Critical appreciation ==
The academic Christian Vachon describes Sieb's playing at its height as among the "best in Canadian history", in an obituary for the Ottawa Citizen. Eric McLean, in a review for the Montreal Star of his solo debut with the Montreal Symphony in 1962, praises his "clean and intelligent playing" but feels his performance could have been more emotional. Thomas Archer, reviewing the same performance for The Gazette, describes Sieb's tone as "full and rich" and praises him for a "simple musical sense" that highlighted the music's strengths.

Jacob Siskind, reviewing his 1968 performance of Prokofiev's Violin Concerto No. 2 with the Montreal Symphony under Zubin Mehta, writes that although Sieb displayed his "customary feeling of involvement in the music" his Stradivarius lacked a "large enough or sufficiently penetrating sound" for a concerto solo, considering that its sound "blends too easily with that of the orchestra and is often lost completely." Geoffrey Thomson, in a review of Sieb's 1972 performance of Walton's Violin Concerto with the Montreal Symphony under Franz-Paul Decker, praises his technical skills but comments that he had sometimes "not wholly absorbed Walton's highly personal brand of lyricism". Siskind, in a 1991 review for the Ottawa Citizen, particularly highlights his playing of "The Bird of Dawning" by the 20th-century Canadian composer Jean Coulthard, writing that Sieb's sound had a "marvellous clarity and freedom... soaring effortlessly above that of the orchestra", as well as of Stravinsky's Violin Concerto, considering that he developed "robust string tone... strong, yet never harsh."

Reviewing a 1989 concert, Siskind writes that "Sieb cut through his part with devastating aplomb" in Bach's Brandenburg Concerto No. 4, and describes him as a "master of understatement" in Mozart's "Turkish" Violin Concerto No. 5, commending his "true poise" in the opening movement, "simplicity and a marvellous sense of line" in the slow movement and having a "good deal of good-natured fun" in the Turkish-style third movement. Frances Goltman, in a Gazette review of his 1963 performance of this concerto, considers him to have an "affinity for Mozart", highlighting his "easy bowing and delicate phrasing" and "keen sense of styling." McLean describes his 1969 performance of Mozart's Violin Concerto in D major as "nicely paced and always phrased in a meaningful way" but notes some initial "nervous sharpness".

In a 1988 review of a chamber concert for the Ottawa Citizen, Siskind describes Sieb's performance as that of a "thoughtful and serious chamber musician", with "uncommon wit and taste and ... an impeccable style to each phrase". Richard Todd, in a 1996 review for the same newspaper of a duo with Zhanna Gumenyuk, describes Sieb's performance as "idiomatic and spirited" in a Mozart sonata, and having "panache and passion" in one by Prokofiev.

== Awards ==
In 1951, Sieb placed eighth at the Marguerite Long–Jacques Thibaud International Competition. He received a gold medal from the city of Toulouse (1989) and was appointed a Chevalier of the Ordre des Arts et des Lettres of France in 1990.

== Personal life ==
Sieb gained Canadian citizenship in 1970. He was married more than once, and had two sons and a daughter. He died on 21 May 2007 in Quebec City, after a stroke.
