= Guy Bélanger =

Canadian opera singer and conductor (born 1946)

- Born: 24 November 1946 (age 79); Quebec City
- Education: Bachelor of Music
- Alma mater: Conservatoire de musique du Québec à Québec; Université Laval
- Occupations: tenor opera director composer
- Awards: Medal of the National Assembly of Quebec (2004)

Guy Bélanger (born 24 November 1946) is a Canadian tenor, opera director, composer, and conductor. In 2004 he was awarded the Medal of the National Assembly of Quebec.

== Education ==
Born Joseph Gabriel Guy Bélanger in Quebec City, Bélanger is the brother of string player and composer Marc Bélanger and the son of conductor Edwin Bélanger. He began his professional education at the Conservatoire de musique du Québec à Québec in the 1965/1966 school year where he was a pupil of Guy Lepage. He transferred to the Université Laval in the Fall semester of 1966. He studied at Laval with Françoise Aubut (theory) and Marthe Létourneau (singing), earning a Bachelor of Music in 1973. He also studied singing privately with Rolande Dion.

== Career ==
In 1968 he co-founded the non-profit opera company Société lyrique d'Aubigny, serving as that company's first artistic and musical director. With the company he regularly conducted performances and occasionally performed in roles up into the 1990s, including the title role in Charles Gounod's Faust (1969) and Nadir in Georges Bizet's Les pêcheurs de perles (1974). In 1984 he founded the Opéra de Québec, serving as the company's Artistic Director up until 1994. He has also worked as a guest conductor with orchestras like the Montreal Symphony Orchestra, the Orchestre Métropolitain, and the Orchestre Symphonique de Québec among other ensembles. He was a candidate for the Parti Québécois during the 2008 provincial election but was unsuccessful.
