= Viola Concerto No.1 (Ichmouratov) =

2004 concerto composed by Airat Ichmouratov

Viola Concerto No. 1, Op.7
- by Airat Ichmouratov
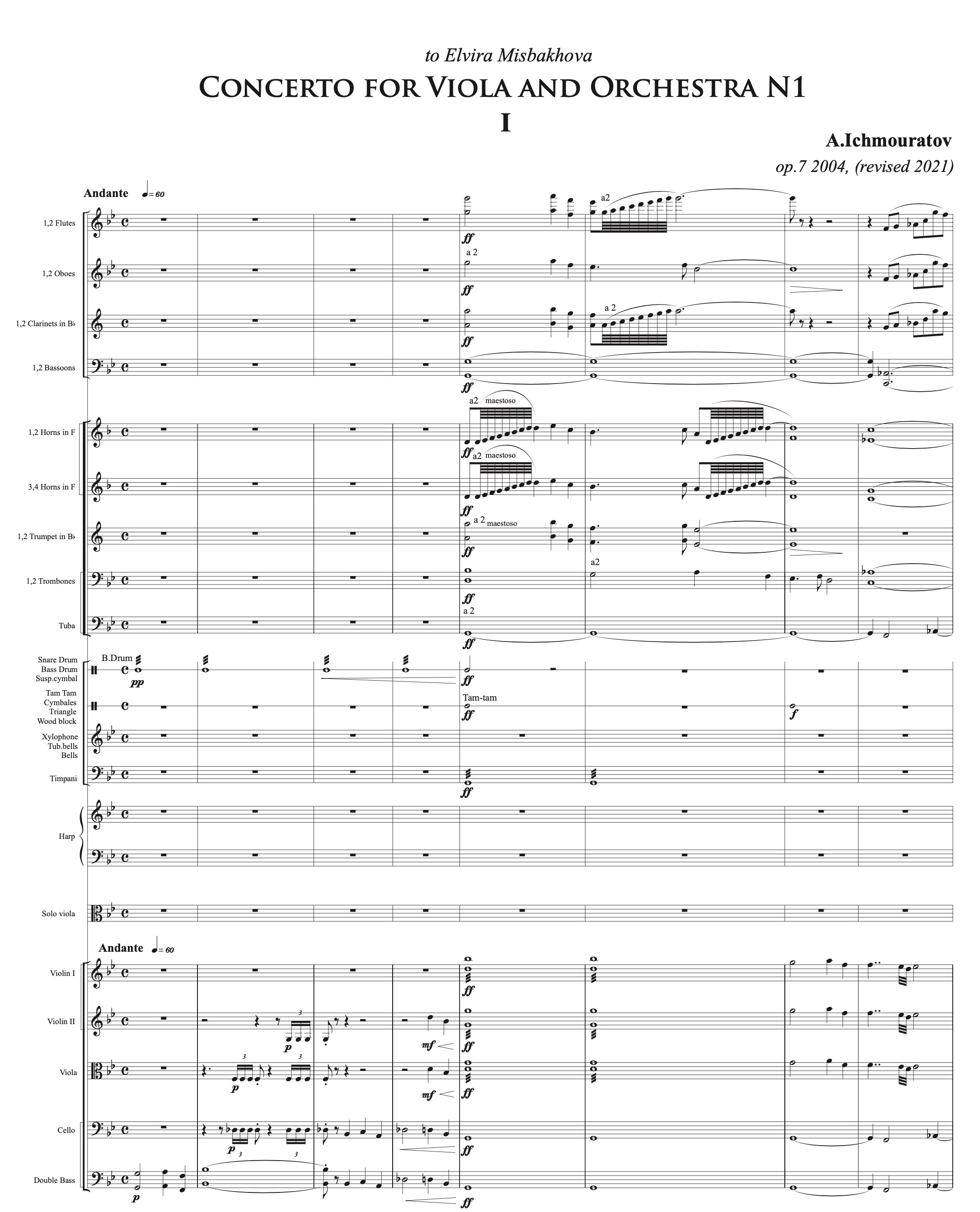
- Viola Concerto No. 1 by Airat Ichmouratov, conductor's score (front page)
- Key: G minor
- Opus: 7
- Composed: 2004
- Dedication: Elvira Misbakhova
- Recorded: Chandos Records – CHAN 5281 (June 2023), Elvira Misbakhova, London Symphony Orchestra
- Duration: 37 minutes
- Movements: 3

Premiere
- Date: 24 February 2005
- Location: Claude Champagne Hall, University of Montreal
- Conductor: Airat Ichmouratov
- Performers: Students of the University of Montreal

The Viola Concerto No. 1, Op. 7, was composed by Airat Ichmouratov in 2004. It was commissioned and premiered by Elvira Misbakhova, a Canadian violist, today the principal viola of Orchestre Métropolitain, who was in 2004 a student at University of Montreal and was looking for new romantic viola concerto for her Doctoral program recital. Concerto was premiered at Claude Champagne Concert Hall in Montreal, Canada on 24 February 2005 by students of University of Montreal under the baton of composer Airat Ichmouratov.

== Analysis ==
The Concerto comprises 3 movements. A typical performance lasts somewhat around 37 minutes.

1. Andante – Allegro moderato – Meno mosso
2. Recitativo – Largo – Più mosso, alla marcia – Tempo I
3. Allegro – Presto

Viola Concerto No. 1 is Ichmouratov's first composition for the orchestra, as stated by Arthur Kaptainis, who also mentions that Elvira Misbakhova wanted a concerto that combined lyrical impulses and virtuoso challenges. The composer, who was described as a "leader in contemporary neo-romantic music worldwide", "Russian musical voice of Quebec", and as a true "sponge of 20th-century music", acknowledges that his music is influenced by Shostakovich, Prokofiev, Tchaikovsky, Mussorgsky, Rachmaninov and other great Russian composers. The result is typical of Ichmouratov's work – neo-romantic concerto for viola with melodic and rich in harmonies content inspired by Russian folk elements.

== Instrumentation ==
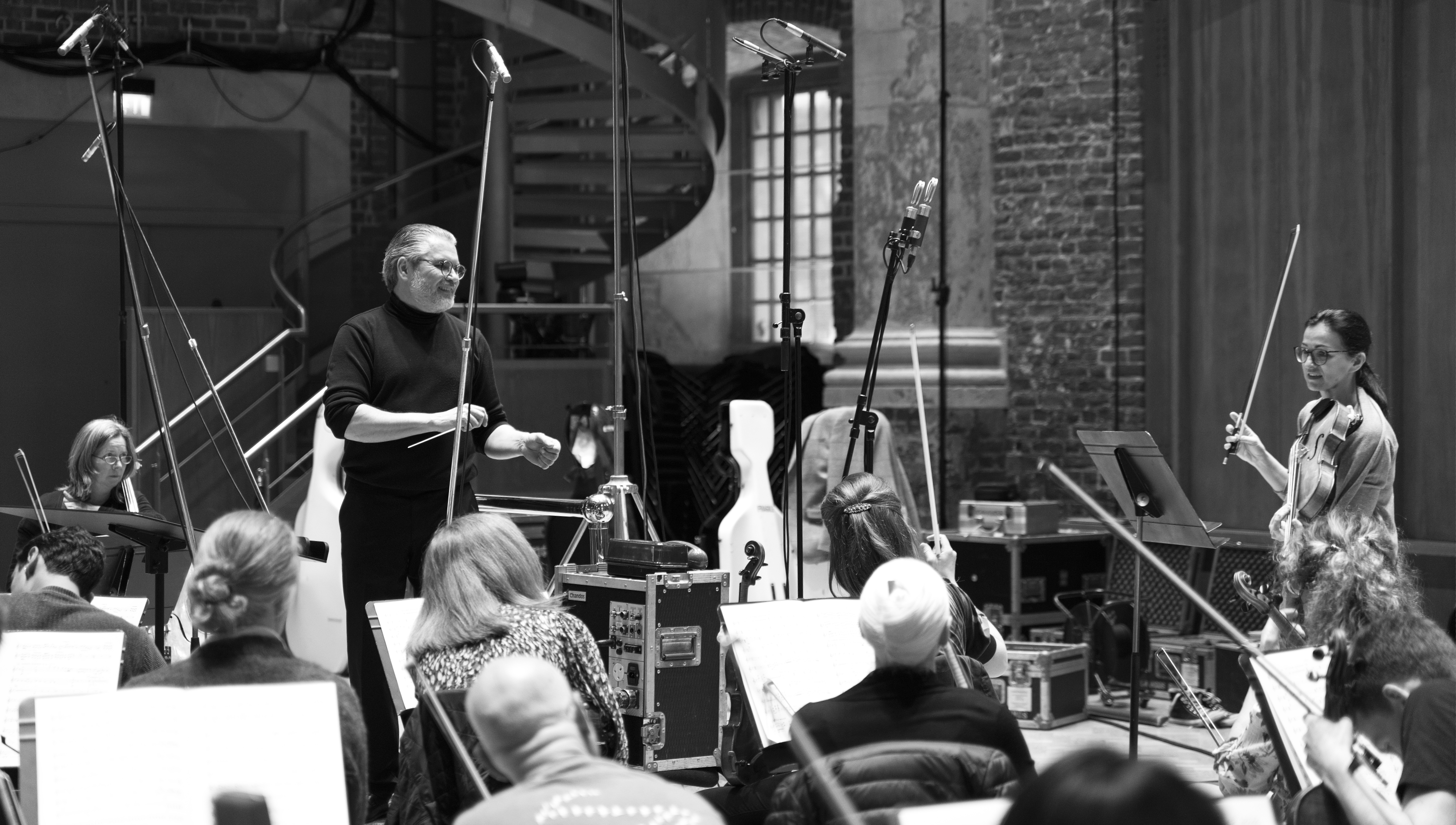
Airat Ichmouratov and Elvira Misbakhova during the recording session with London Symphony orchestra on 5 May 2022

The Viola Concerto No. 1 is scored for the following orchestra (percussion, performed by 3 players):

- 2 flutes
- 2 oboes
- 2 clarinets in B♭
- 2 bassoons
- 4 horns in F
- 2 trumpets in B♭
- 3 trombones: tenor, bass
- Tuba
- Timpani
- Triangle
- Cymbals
- Snare drum
- Bass drum
- Suspended cymbal
- Tam tam
- Tambourine
- Glockenspiel
- Xylophone
- Wood blocks
- Harp
- Strings

== Recording ==
- Chandos Records: CHAN 5281 – Ichmouratov: Viola Concerto No.1/Piano Concerto; London Symphony Orchestra, Elvira Misbakhova viola, Airat Ichmouratov conductor

== Critical reception ==
The recording of the Viola Concerto No. 1 gained average-to-positive reviews. Michael Church of BBC Music Magazine wrote: "its slow movement is gorgeous". Gregor Tassie of MusicWeb International wrote: "entry by the viola in a bewitchingly beautiful theme". Frédéric Cardin of Panm360 wrote: "...rich in cushioned harmonies and orchestral moiré".
