= Princess Patricia's Canadian Light Infantry Band =

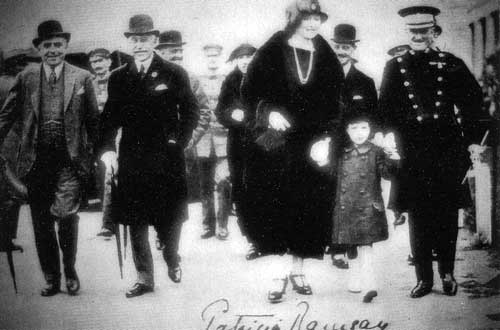
Princess Patricia of Connaught with the Duke of Connaught and Captain T. W. James (far right), Director of the regimental band at Wembley, England in 1924.

Princess Patricia's Canadian Light Infantry Band (PPCLI Band) was the former brass and reed regimental band of the Princess Patricia's Canadian Light Infantry regiment of the Canadian Army. It was maintained by the regiment from 1919–1994 at CFB Calgary.

== History ==
The band was founded in 1919, with its core consisting of musicians from the St. Mary's Boys Brigade Band and the 140th Battalion (St. John's Tigers) Band. When the latter was disbanded in November 1917, the remaining band was merged with the PPCLI to become the PPCLI Band in 1919. It was formed under the direction of Captain Tommy James and was originally stationed at Fort Osborne Barracks in Winnipeg, Manitoba. In 1935, Bugle bands were established in the PPCLI's 1st and 2nd battalions. It would be accompanied by a dance band that would be established two years later in 1937.

At the start of the Second World War, members of the PPCLI Band volunteered for active duty, which resulted in its dissolving in 1939. In 1941, the 1st Canadian Division Band was largely made up of former PPCLI Bandsmen. The band was reactivated after the war at Wainwright, Alberta. In 1950 the band was revived in Calgary, where like other military bands (the Band of the Canadian Guards included), members were recruited from the British Army and the Dutch Army. By 1951, the band had numbered 20 members and just two years later in late 1953, it reached its quota of 55 personnel. Some of these members included notable members of the band, including Brian Albert Gossip and Albert Brown.

On 13 April 1959, the band took part in a NATO military festival in Arnhem in honor of the organization's 10th anniversary. The 60s and 70s marked an increase in its activities in Alberta and abroad. It was often noted as a regular contingent in the Calgary Stampede as one of the main performing units. The band was one of 17 tri-service bands to take part in the Canadian Armed Forces Tattoo celebrating Canada's centennial year celebrations in 1967. It was selected in 1976 to represent Canada along with the Band of the Royal 22nd Regiment in the Tournament of Roses in Pasadena, California. It played at the opening of the 1978 Commonwealth Games in Edmonton in the presence of Queen Elizabeth II and the Prince Philip, Duke of Edinburgh.

In the early 1980s, the band under the direction of Captain R. Swaneveld, performed during the Changing of the Guard ceremony on Parliament Hill with the Public Duties Detachment (now the Ceremonial Guard). Due to military budget cuts in 1994, the entire band was disbanded and reduced to a Corps of Drums, known today as the PPCLI Drumline. The St. Mary's Band is today known as the St. Mary's Community Band and is active in St. John as a civilian marching band.

== Directors ==
- Captain Thomas William James (1919–1939)
- Lieutenant A.L. Streeter (1939)
- Captain A. Brown (1950–1953)
- Captain F.M. McLeod (1953–1957)
- Captain Herbert A. Jeffrey (director 1957–1964)
- Captain P.A. Medcalf (1968–1969)
- Captain J. Dowell (1969–1972)
- Captain Leonard Camplin (1972–1978)
- Major Jean-François Pierret (1978–1980)
- Captain R. Swaneveld (1980–1984)
- Captain Jean-Pierre Montminy (1984–1987)
- Captain D. Embree (1987–1990)
- Captain Dave Jones (1990–1994)

== Repertoire ==
- Regimental Music
  - Quick: "Has Anyone Seen the Colonel/Tipperary/Mademoiselle from Armentières" (medley)
  - Slow: "Lili Marlene"
- Battalion music
  - 1st Battalion: "The Maple Leaf"
  - 2nd Battalion: "March Winnipeg"
  - 3rd Battalion: "Imperial Echoes"
- Army marches
  - The Great Little Army
  - Vimy Ridge
  - The Canadian Infantryman
  - Alberta Bound
  - Canada Overseas

== See also ==
- Canadian military bands
- Royal Canadian Artillery Band
- Regimental Pipes and Drums of The Calgary Highlanders
- 4 Wing Band
- Military band
