= Bélanger (disambiguation) =

Bélanger is a surname.

Bélanger may also refer to:

- Bélanger, Ontario, a community in the city of Greater Sudbury
- Bélanger, Saskatchewan, a community in northern Saskatchewan, a part of Division No. 18
- Belanger, Saskatchewan, a community in southern Saskatchewan, a part of Maple Creek No. 111, Saskatchewan
- Mount Belanger, a mountain in the Canadian Rockies

== See also ==
- "Commission Bélanger-Campeau" or "Bélanger-Campeau Commission," terms sometimes used to refer to the Commission on the Political and Constitutional Future of Quebec
- Bellanger
