= Royal Canadian Artillery Band =

- Musique de l'Artillerie royale canadienne
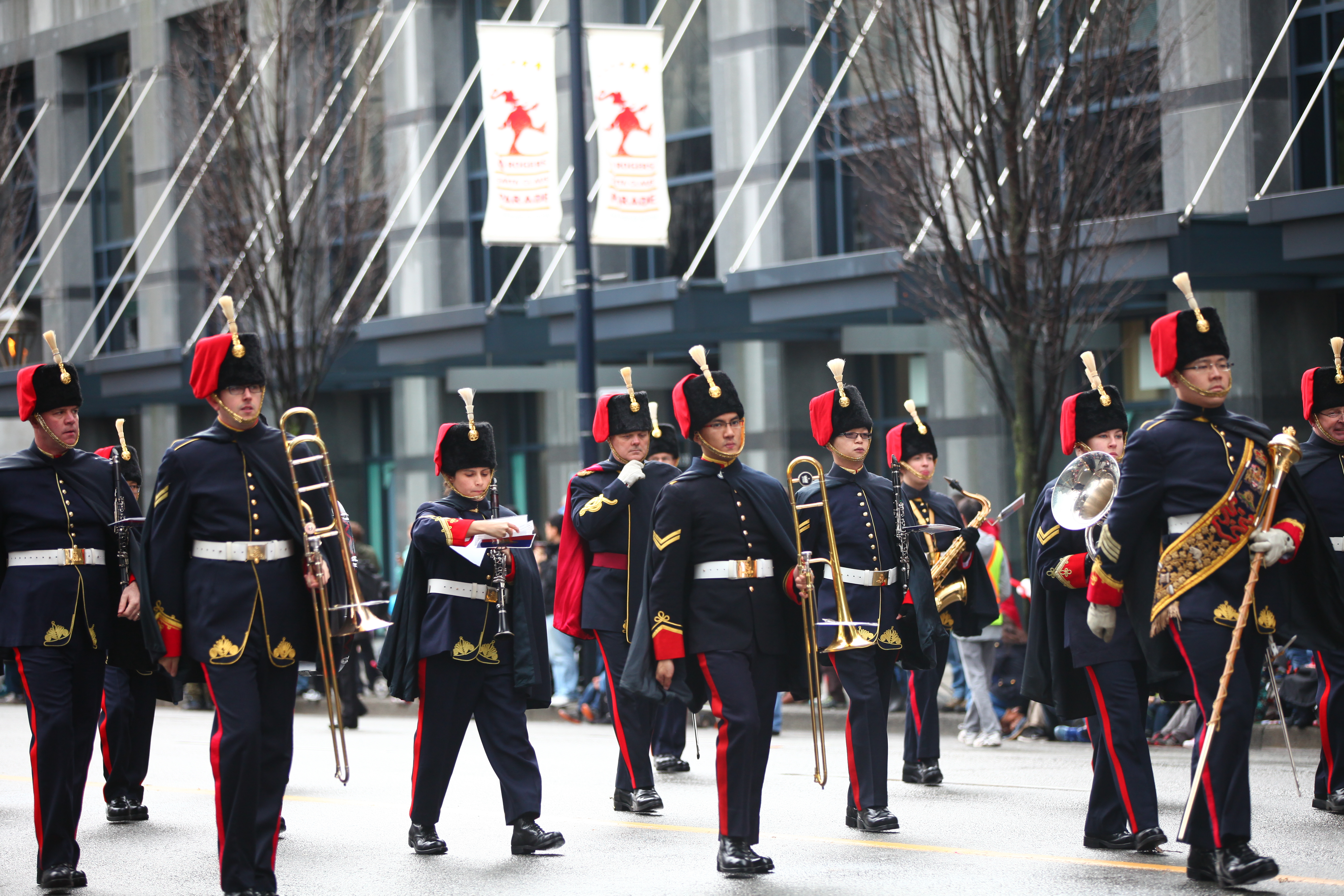
- Bandmembers at the 2012 Santa Claus Parade in Vancouver.
- Active: 1899–present
- Country: Canada
- Branch: Canadian Army
- Type: Military band
- Role: Public duties
- Size: 35-piece band
- Part of: 3rd Canadian Division Support Group
- Headquarters: Steele Barracks, CFB Edmonton
- Nickname: RCA Band
- Mottos: Ubique (Latin for 'everywhere'); Quo fas et gloria ducunt (Latin for 'whither right and glory lead')
- Colours: Blue with scarlet facings (full dress, concert dress and mess dress)
- Website: www.canada.ca/en/army/corporate/3-canadian-division/royal-canadian-artillery-band.html

Commanders
- Commanding officer: Cpt David P. Gagnon
- Band sergeant major: MWO Daniel Keels

The Royal Canadian Artillery Band (French: Musique de l'Artillerie royale canadienne) is one of six Regular Force bands in the Canadian Armed Forces. Located at Canadian Forces Base Edmonton, the RCA Band provides music designed to support Canadian Forces operations, foster morale and esprit de corps, and promote Canada and the Canadian military nationally and abroad. The band operates mainly in western Canada and is de facto the representative band of the Canadian Army in the western provinces. All unit members are professional musicians in addition to being members of the military, which enables the band to adopt a variety of configurations to suit the musical needs of their audiences. Ensembles can range from jazz combos, rock bands, and chamber groups, through stage and show bands to full marching and concert bands.

== History ==
The RCA Band traces its roots to the "B" Battery Band of the Royal Canadian Artillery in Quebec City. Founded in 1879, it was composed of volunteer militia and professionally trained musicians from the United Kingdom and France, becoming the first permanent military band. It became the Royal Canadian Garrison Artillery Band in 1899 under Joseph Vézina, a prominent Quebec musician who was also the first director of the Orchestre Symphonique de Québec and led the first performance of "O Canada" in 1880.

A second band part of the Royal Canadian Garrison Artillery was formed in Kingston in 1905 and directed by Major Alfred Light. During the First World War, the RCGA Band was stationed at the Citadelle of Quebec. During this time, it was mentioned in an article of the Montreal Star as "justly known as one of the best bands in North America". The two bands were the only ones operational at the end of the war. In 1922, 20 members of the band broke off or created the Band of the Royal 22nd Regiment. During the Second World War, the band was for the most part stationed overseas, one of them being the RCHA Band which was reformed and stationed in Shilo, Manitoba, and then Winnipeg.

In 1952, the Royal Canadian Artillery Band was formed in Halifax under Captain E.R. Wragg, and in the following years it travelled overseas to entertain troops in South Korea. In 1955 Captain Kenneth Elloway became the new bandmaster and was vital in highlighting the RCA Band on an international stage. He arranged appearances on BBC radio, invited guest performers, and led the RCA Band in the 1957 Bermuda Tattoo. After the Unification of the Canadian Armed Forces in 1968 the RCA Band in Halifax was dissolved and reformed in Montreal. The RCA Band performed for over 100,000 spectators in 1988. The RCA Band was moved from Montreal to Edmonton on 4 December 1997.

== Uniform ==
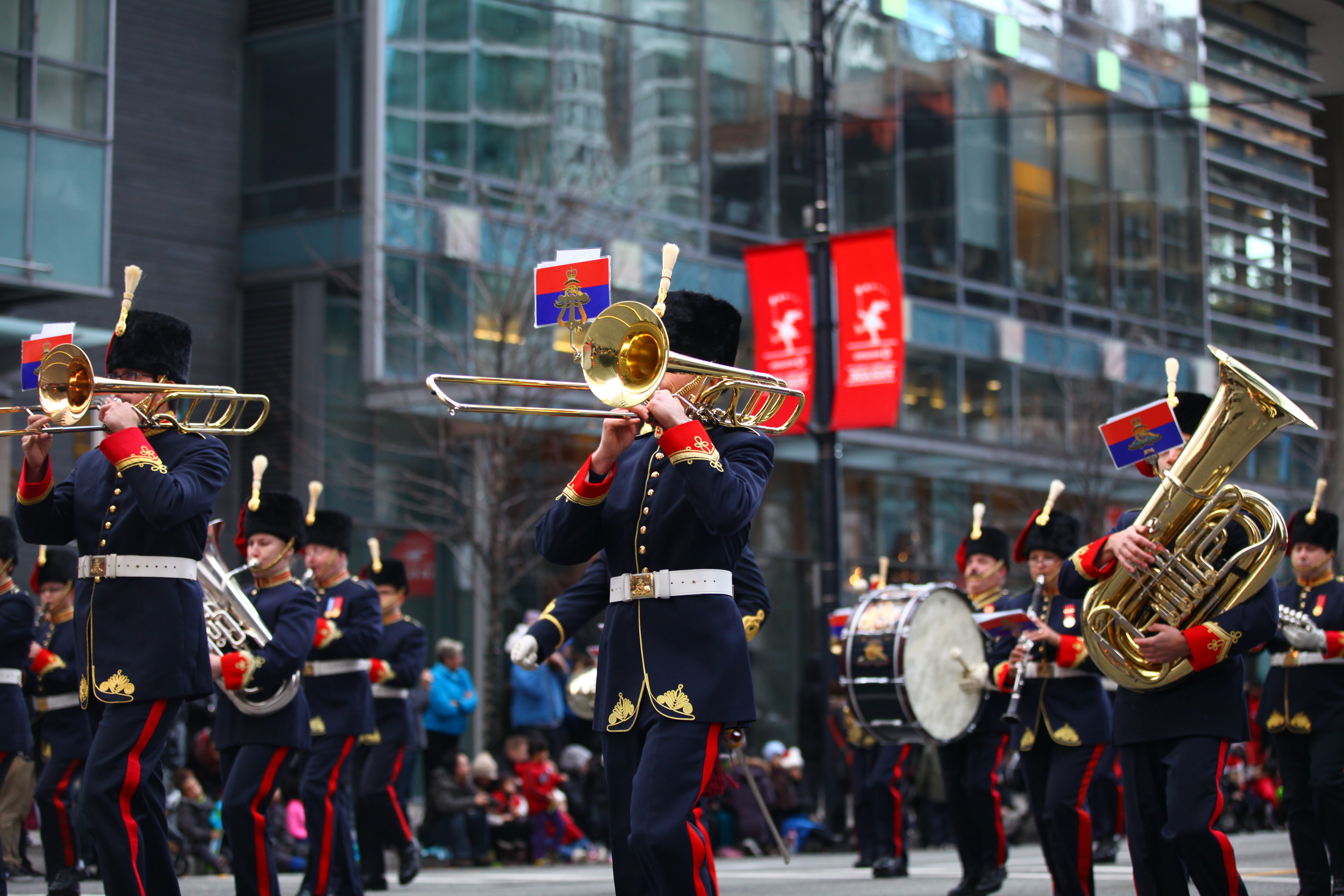
The RCA Band uniform, seen here with a member of the Band of the 15th Field Regiment, an affiliated reserve band with the RCA Band.

The RCA's musicians uniforms are based on the officers pattern of the ceremonial uniforms of the now dissolved Royal Artillery Band. RCA musicians, when in full dress uniform, wear the busby (not to be confused with the bearskin cap), with tall plumes attached to ferrule to the top of the front. Unlike the Royal Artillery, the RCA Band wears white plumes, and do not wear the cavalry spurs. Bandsman wear navy blue tunics, quilt lined with a standing collar, fastened with hooks. Navy blue cavalry-style pantaloons are also worn, with an RCA stripe in scarlet sewn onto outside of each leg.

== Role ==
The role of the Royal Canadian Artillery Band is to provide a comprehensive, professional musical service to 3rd Canadian Division Support Group, 3rd Canadian Division, the Canadian Armed Forces and the government of Canada.

=== Performance history ===
In 1994–95, the RCA Band participated in the Canada Remembers program, which took the band on a tour of Asia, the United Kingdom, the Netherlands and Belgium. In 2000, the RCA Band was chosen by the Directorate of History and Heritage as the Canadian representative for the Kangwon International Tattoo commemorating the golden jubilee of the start of the Korean War. In 2004, the band participated in a week-long tour of Bosnia-Herzegovina, which was centred on its participation in the Change of Command Ceremony for Brigadier General Stuart A. Beare in Banja Luka. In the summer of that same year, the band performed in the Fortissimo Sunset Ceremony on Parliament Hill with the Band of the Ceremonial Guard and the Albany Marine Band. The band travelled to Sweden in 2006, where they performed in Kungstradgarden and Strängnäs as well as marched in the 20th Swedish Military Tattoo, which included a parade to the Stockholm Palace while performing pieces such as "The Voice of the Guns" and "Glorious Victory".

In June 2017, the band provided musical support for a contingent of the 2nd Battalion, Princess Patricia's Canadian Light Infantry, which provided the Queen's Guard in England at Buckingham Palace, St James's Palace, the Tower of London and Windsor Castle. In October–November 2018, the band provided support for a contingent from the 3rd Battalion, The Royal Canadian Regiment, which provided the Queen's Guard. It was one of the rare occasions when the band wore the Atholl-grey greatcoats authorized for wear in the autumn and winter.

== Organization ==
The band's commanding officer (CO) is the unit's principal conductor. The CO is responsible for the creative direction of the band and all facets of musical performance. The principal components of the band are the following sections:

- Brass
- Woodwind
- Percussion

The RCA Band is a 35 piece band that also performs in the following configurations:

- Parade Band
- Concert Band
- Jazz Big Band (10 piece ensemble)
- Windage Salon Orchestra
- The Soul Orchestra
- Jazz Task Force
- Chamber groups
  - Woodwind Quintet
  - Brass Quintet

Members of the band spend most of their time engaged in training activities when not delivering formal performances. Musical training usually includes up to three hours of individual practice per day and collective practice sessions in groups ranging in size from quartets to full unit rehearsals.

=== Pipes and Drums ===
In 2008, for the first time in its then over 100 years history, Corporal Jim Douglas, who was a piper in the CF, was posted to The RCA Band as part of what is now the RCA Pipes and Drums, which as of 2010, had four members. In November 2012, it appeared in public for the first time to perform at a public concert in support of a charity. The Pipes and Drums of the RCA serve as the Canadian counterpart to the former and current pipe bands of the British Royal Artillery.

== Music ==
The RCA Band regularly performs the regimental marches: "The British Grenadiers" and the "Royal Artillery Slow March". The "Royal Artillery Slow March" was written by Princess Victoria, Duchess of Kent (mother of Queen Victoria) around 1836. The tune of "The British Grenadiers" was first adopted for use as a regimental march by the Honourable Artillery Company (the oldest British regiment), during the English Civil War. The melody was brought to England by King William III of the Netherlands and soon after became popular in the country and was known as the "Royal Artillery Grenadiers March" unofficially until 1882. It first appeared in print as "The British Grenadiers" in 1740. The popularity of the tune "The British Grenadiers" subsequently led to its adoption by all regiments who wear as their cap or collar badges, the symbol of the grenade. This included the Royal Artillery, and as a result it is now used by the RCA.

== Notable members ==
The following are notable members of the RCA Band:

- Captain Kenneth Elloway, British teacher, trombonist, and conductor.
- Klaus Østby, Norwegian-Canadian musician.
- William T. Wornes, Commandant of the Canadian Forces School of Music.
- Charles Villeneuve, Supervisor of Music of the Canadian Forces from 1980 to 1984.
- Joseph Vézina, Quebec conductor and composer
- Captain Charles O'Neill, the director of the band of the newly formed Royal 22nd Regiment.
- Giuseppe Pando, writer of the march Celer Paratus Callidus, the original march of the Canadian Army.
- Frederick Edwin Leadston, trombonist who served with the RCA Band as well as the Vimy Band and the Band of the Canadian Guards.
- Captain Matthew Clark, director of the Royal Canadian Air Force Band since 2016.

== See also ==
- Canadian military bands
- Music Branch (Canadian Forces)
- Charles O'Neill (musician)

== Footnotes ==
- CWO (Ret'd) Jack Kopstein CD ' When the Band Begins to Play: A History of Military Music in Canada (1992).
- CWO (Ret`d) Jack Kopstein CD & Ian Pearson `The Heritage of Military Music in Canada` (St. Catharines, Ont.: Vanwell Pub., 2002)
- CWO (Ret`d) Jack Kopstein CD & Ian Pearson `The History of the Marches in Canada: Regimental/Branch/Corps` (Hignell Printing Ltd, 1994).
