= John Wilson McConnell =

Canadian industrialist and philanthropist (1877–1963)

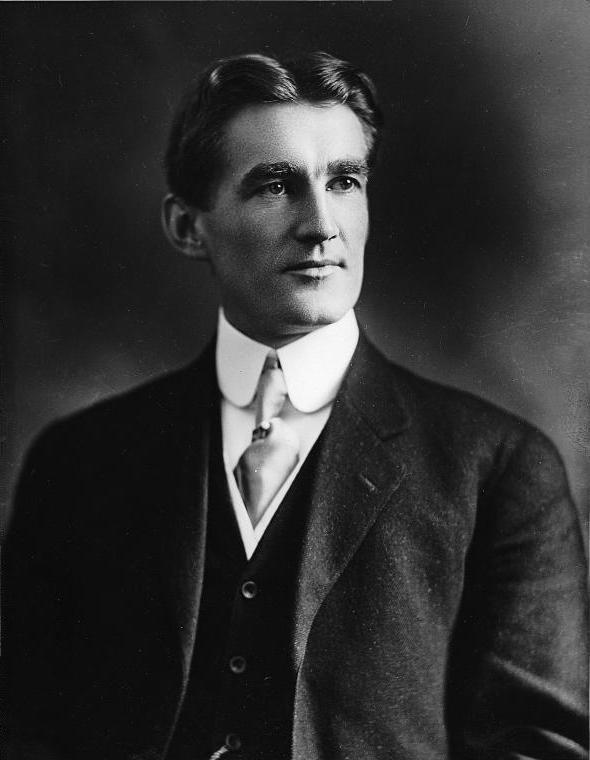
- McConnell in 1910
- Born: July 1, 1877; Muskoka, Ontario, Canada
- Died: November 6, 1963 (aged 86); Montreal, Quebec, Canada
- Spouse: Lily May Griffith (m. 1905)

John Wilson McConnell (July 1, 1877 – November 6, 1963) was a Canadian sugar refiner, newspaper publisher, humanitarian and philanthropist in Quebec, Canada.

== Early life ==
J.W. McConnell was born to a farming family in the Muskoka region of Ontario. He left home as a boy of fourteen to find employment in the city of Toronto, Ontario. His first job paid $3 a week, but as an employee at Standard Chemical Co., he worked his way up to a management position that eventually led to a transfer to Montreal in 1901. The then 23-year-old lived for a time in a room at the Montreal YMCA, an institution that he would later thank through his volunteering to help lead a successful fund-raising campaign. In 1905, he married Lily May Griffith. They had four children.

== St. Lawrence Sugar ==
McConnell had limited formal education. Within a few years, McConnell turned his savings into sizeable investments and, in 1912, he gained majority control of St. Lawrence Sugar, a company founded in 1879 to compete with Montreal's Redpath Sugar refinery. The sugar refinery was struggling at the time McConnell stepped in but, renamed St. Lawrence Sugar Refineries, Limited, he turned it into a profitable business and would retain ownership for the rest of his life.

== Montreal Star ==
During World War I, McConnell played a key role in helping organize war bond drives. His business skills were put to use by the Government of Canada, which appointed him to the unpaid position of Director of Licences for the Wartime Trade Board. In the decade following the end of the war, he sought out more business opportunities, and in 1925, he bought the publishing business belonging to Lord Atholstan (1848–1938), which included the Montreal Star newspaper. Under McConnell's leadership, the newspapers and magazines flourished.

An extremely wealthy man, the respect he earned in the Montreal business community led to invitations for him to sit on the board of directors of a number of major corporations, including the Bank of Montreal, Canadian Pacific Railway, Sun Life Assurance, International Nickel Company, Dominion Bridge Company Limited, Holt Renfrew, and Dominion Rubber Company. At the same time, his increasing community work resulted in him being offered a seat on the board of management of the Montreal General Hospital in 1922. As well, he was made a governor of McGill University in 1927 and of the Royal Victoria Hospital the following year, both institutions benefiting greatly from his generosity.

== Philanthropy ==
McConnell quietly set about becoming one of his country's greatest philanthropists. He shunned publicity, and his own newspaper was never allowed to mention any of his charitable donations. To aid in the treatment of cancer, he purchased a cobalt 60Co therapy machine for the Imperial Cancer Campaign, and he donated them to the Jewish General Hospital, the Hôpital Notre-Dame, the Hôtel-Dieu de Montréal, and the Hôtel-Dieu de Québec in Quebec City. In 1937, McConnell founded the McConnell Foundation.

A major benefactor of McGill University, McConnell served on the Board of Governors for 30 years (1928–58). He gave the university Purvis Hall in 1942, Chancellor Day Hall (James Ross mansion) in 1948, the McConnell Brain Imaging Centre at the Montreal Neurological Institute in 1952, and the McConnell Winter Stadium in 1956. In 1959, he donated the funds to build the McConnell Engineering Building, which doubled the number of engineering classrooms and offices, and in 1961, built Presbyterian College (Morrice Hall). After his death, the McConnell Foundation undertook the 1971 renovations to the McCord Museum.

During World War II, after the United States Lend-lease program was launched in March 1941, fellow Canadian businessman Max Aitken, the then volunteer British Minister of Aircraft Production, asked McConnell to help finance the training of pilots, such as Jackie Cochran in the United States, to ferry American-built aircraft across the Atlantic. McConnell donated $1 million for the "Wings for Britain" campaign and in recognition of his contribution, a flying squadron was given his name.

In the 1940s and 1950s, McConnell contributed money to build the following Boys, later Boys and Girls clubs. Service clubs and community groups participated in appropriate fundraising as well. 1949 Rosemount Boys Club. Followed by the 1950 East End Boys and Girls Club(Maisonneuve district) followed in short order by the Point St. Charles Boys and Girls Club in the Point, Unity Boys and Girls Club, in lower Westmount bordering on St. Henri, Dawson Boys and Girls Club in Verdun, plus one in Trois - Rivières. McConnell's benevolent works extended to individuals such as Maureen Forrester, who recounted in her biography how he had learned of the difficulty she was experiencing holding down a job while trying to develop her singing career. He contacted her and offered to cover her expenses for three years so she could train professionally — on the condition she never reveal his name. A patron of the Montreal Symphony Orchestra, in the early 1960s, when the orchestra was preparing to move to new facilities at Place des Arts, McConnell purchased the 1722 Laub–Petschnikoff Stradivarius violin for use by concertmaster and violinist Calvin Sieb.

== Death and legacy ==
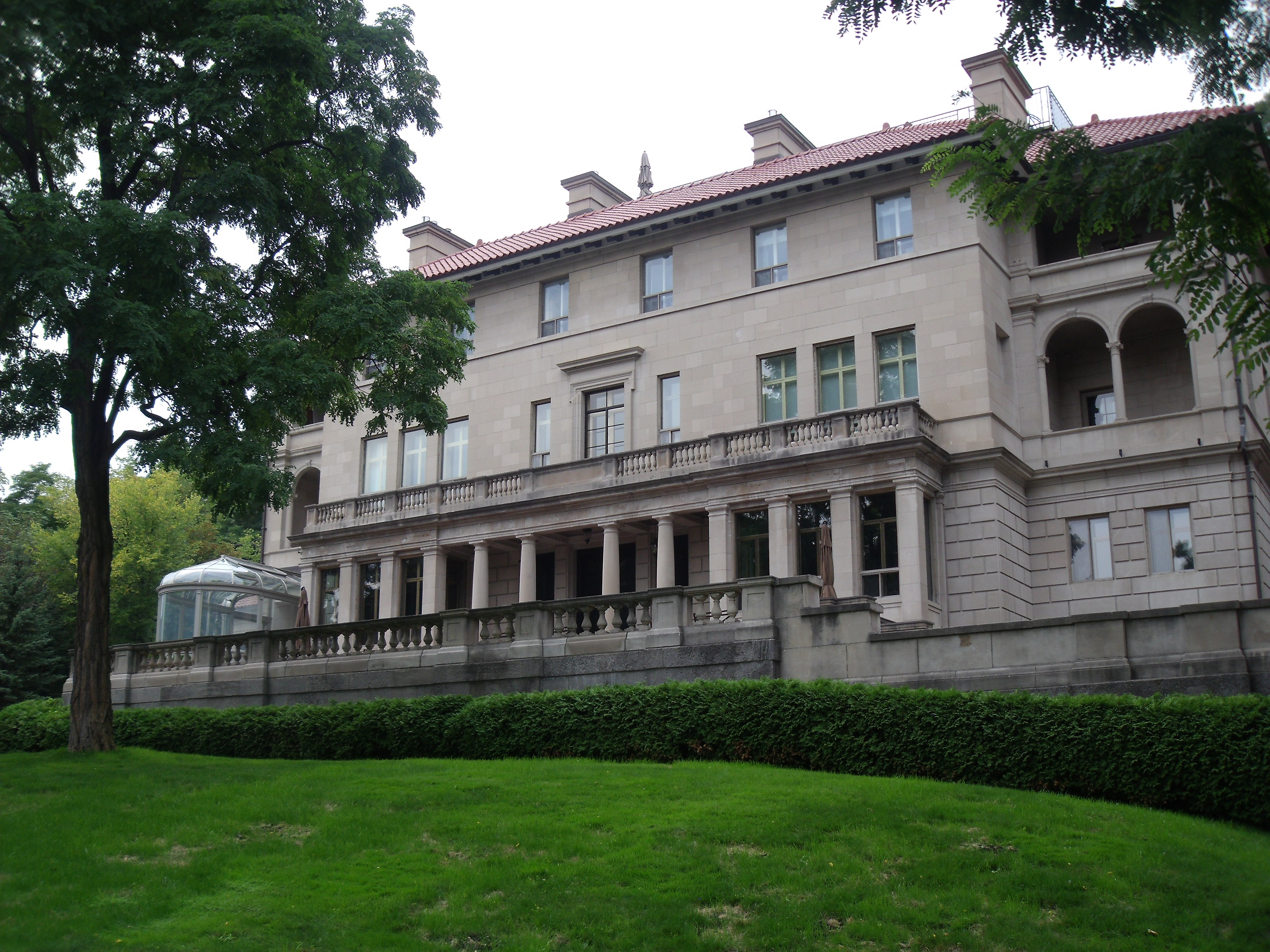
The J.W. McConnell mansion at 1475 Pine Avenue West in Montreal

When McConnell died in 1963, his newspaper's rival, the Montreal Gazette, gave his death front-page coverage, describing him as "one of the world's great philanthropists" and that he had "played a key role in building the institutions in this city." He was interred in the family plot at Mount Royal Cemetery in Montreal.

McConnell's grand Italianate residence at 1475 Pine Avenue West in Montreal's Golden Square Mile, known as J.W. McConnell House, was subsequently donated to the Benedictines around 1975. Under Dom John Main, the mansion became the Benedictine Priory of Montreal in 1977, until that closed in 1990. It then became known as Unitas, an ecumenical meditation centre, before being sold in the early 2000s and restored to its original use as a single-family home. In February 2019, it was announced in the media that the McConnell mansion was for sale with an asking price of $40 million, the highest-priced residential building so far in Quebec history. As of April 2020, the 10-bedroom house was still for sale, but with a reduced price of $29.5 million.

In 1973, the Montreal Star was sold to Free Press Publications of Toronto and closed its doors within a few years. In 1984, his estate sold St. Lawrence Sugar Refineries to the Saint John, New Brunswick-based Lantic Sugar Limited (now part of Rogers Sugar).

In his honour, McGill University named several buildings after him, and the world-renowned McConnell Brain Imaging Centre can be found at the Montreal Neurological Institute. Almost thirty years after his death, his foundation was still carrying out his philanthropic ideals. In 1992, the J.W. McConnell Building opened at Concordia University in Montreal, and the McConnell Foundation continues to undertake charitable work to this day.
