= Edwin Bélanger =

Canadian conductor and music educator (1910–2005)

Edwin Bélanger (18 November 1910 – 14 January 2005) was a Canadian conductor, violinist, violist, arranger, and music educator. He had an association with the Orchestre Symphonique de Québec for more than 50 years, including serving as the orchestra's principal conductor from 1942 to 1951.

== Education ==
Born in Montmagny, Quebec, Bélanger was the father of musicians Marc Bélanger and Guy Bélanger. He received his general education and violin instruction at the Brothers of the Sacred Heart College in his native city. He then pursued further studies at the Séminaire de Québec where he was a pupil of J.-Alexandre Gilbert (violin) and Omer Létourneau (harmony). He notably married one of the daughters of the latter teacher. After winning the Prix d'Europe for violin in 1933, he pursued further studies with Carl Flesch in Paris (1933–1934, violin) and Ernest Read in London (1934–1935, conducting).

== Career ==
Bélanger began his performance career in 1928 at the age of 17, as a violinist in the Société symphonique de Québec (Orchestre Symphonique de Québec), remaining with the ensemble through 1931. After completing his studies in Europe he began working as a violinist, violist, conductor, and arranger at the Canadian Broadcasting Corporation in Quebec City in 1935. In 1936 he founded the Cercle philharmonique de Québec, serving as its conductor until 1942 when the orchestra merged into the Quebec Symphony Orchestra. For the QSO he served as artistic director from 1942 to 1951 and was later a frequent guest conductor. He was first chair of the QSO's second violins from 1966 to 1975 and the orchestra's principal violist from 1975 to 1977. From 1977 to 1984 he played in the second violin section of the orchestra.

In 1937 Bélanger succeeded Charles O'Neill as the director of the band of the Royal 22nd Regiment in 1937. He was awarded the rank of captain in the Canadian Army at the time of his appointment. He remained in that role until 1961 when he became the proprietor of Procure générale de musique, a music retail and publishing firm. With the band he notably gave concert tours in Asia, Europe and the United States in addition to performing throughout Canada. He later served as the music director of Les Concerts Couperin from 1977 to 1982.

Throughout his career Bélanger was active as a teacher of the violin and viola, both privately and at a number of institutions. He served several terms as president of the Académie de musique du Québec (1947–1950, 1953–1956, 1963–1965, and 1971–1974). From 1973 to 1985 he taught viola and orchestral classes at the Conservatoire de musique du Québec à Québec. In 1984 the University of Quebec awarded him an honorary doctorate. He died in Quebec City in 2005 at the age of 94.
