= Kevin Mallon =

Northern Irish classical conductor

Kevin Mallon is a Northern Irish classical conductor, who now lives in Toronto, Ontario, Canada.

== Biography and career ==
Kevin Mallon was born in Elizabeth, New Jersey but at an early age he went to live in Belfast, Northern Ireland and became a student at St. Malachy's College. He won a scholarship to Chetham's School of Music in Manchester, England, where he was influenced by John Eliot Gardiner. He later studied composition with Peter Maxwell Davies at Dartington College of Arts, and studied violin at the Royal Northern College of Music.

Mallon played violin with orchestras such as the Hallé Orchestra and the BBC Philharmonic, and later became concertmaster for Le Concert Spirituel and Les Arts Florissants. He performed with these groups around the world, in many European countries, in the United States and Canada, and in Asia. In 1993 he accepted positions with the University of Toronto and Tafelmusik Baroque Orchestra. In 1996, Mallon founded the Aradia Ensemble, of which he is the music director. With this early music group, and with the Toronto Chamber Orchestra, of which Mallon is music director, he has recorded more than fifty CDs for the Naxos label, including works by Buxtehude, Charpentier, Handel, Lully, Purcell and Vivaldi.

Mallon also conducts operas, working with the contemporary opera company Opera Anonymous, and with other orchestras, with whom he has conducted operas by Handel, Mozart and Vivaldi, among others. From 2004 to 2009, he was artistic director of Ireland's Opera 2005, formed to celebrate Cork's tenure as European Cultural Capital. This company had considerable success, being nominated for Three Irish Times Theatre Awards.

• Mozart, Marriage of Figaro, February 2005 (Irish Times Awards nomination) • Bizet, Carmen, June 2005 (Co-production with Castleward Opera) • Weill, Threepenny Opera, June 2006 • Rossini, Barber of Seville, November 2006 (Irish Times Awards nomination) • Lehar, Merry Widow, June 2007 • Mozart, Don Giovanni, October 2007 • Verdi Ballo in Machera, September 2008 (Irish Times Awards nomination)

In 2009, Mallon was touring conductor for the Odesa Opera Theatre, Odesa, Ukraine. He created new productions of Carmen and Don Giovanni and conducted these on tour to the Netherlands, Belgium, Luxemburg and Spain. He conducts the West Side Chamber Orchestra, based in New York City, and is music director of Thirteen Strings, a chamber ensemble based in Ottawa, Ontario, Canada. In 2010, Mallon composed and conducted music for the Camelot TV series. In 2013, he was appointed as the new musical director of Orchestra Toronto, taking the podium to conduct the orchestra's 2nd concert in its 60th anniversary season on 8 December 2013.

He has described his conducting philosophy as follows:

Perhaps also of interest, is the transition I made from violinist to conductor. I was a good violinist, but I believe I am a better conductor. Maybe you need that self-belief to be a conductor—but it’s not meant in an arrogant fashion. Indeed, in of myself I am often full of huge Irish Catholic self doubts! All that to say, is that I have always known that I had my limitations as a violinist, but that I could rally many personal resources together to inspire musicians and to achieve a unified result, which combines everyone’s skills and contribution ... (It often sounds a bit new age-y, but when I conduct I focus on a point in space above the performers and I imagine everyone’s creative spirit converging on this point. Even if it is imaginary, it helps define that music is something that flows through you and comes from a spiritual place—and hopefully leaves your own ego aside in the process. – Or at very least you are not the dominating spirit!) ... Further to this is the notion that you are trying to achieve something that is beyond good or bad, right or wrong. If everyone is inspired to focus on a strong musical vision, one that is achieved together, then the performers can let go of the tensions and stress and fear of playing badly. When it works well, one can feel the flow of the music. On a more practical level, I have discovered that if you are an a***hole in rehearsal you eat alone that evening—something that can lead to a lonely life on the road. Better to be a colleague—to treat everyone as equal, making it clear that they have a job and you have a job—that none is more important than the other. (Not that “all are equal but some are more equal than others!”) That way you can enjoy a drink with friends- God help the tyrannical conductor!
