= Marc Bélanger =

Marc Bélanger may refer to:

- Mark Belanger (1944–1998), American shortstop
- Marc Bélanger (musician) (born 1940), Canadian violinist, violist, conductor, arranger, composer, and music educator
- Marc Bélanger (trade unionist) (born 1950), Canadian trade unionist and labour organizer
