= Julian Kuerti =

Canadian conductor

Julian Andreas Kuerti (born September 28, 1976 in Toronto, Ontario, Canada) is a Canadian conductor. He is the son of pianist Anton Kuerti and cellist Kristine Bogyo.

Kuerti read engineering and physics at the University of Toronto, and graduated with an honours degree. He later began conducting studies at the University of Toronto, starting in 2000. He has also been a conducting student of Lutz Koehler, at the Berlin University of the Arts.

Kuerti served as the founding artistic director and principal conductor of the Berlin-based group Solistenensemble Kaleidoskop from 2005 to 2008. He was Assistant Conductor of the Budapest Festival Orchestra in the 2006-2007 season. He held the same post with the Boston Symphony Orchestra from 2007 to 2010.

In 2012, Kuerti became principal guest conductor of the Orquesta Sinfónica Universidad de Concepción in Chile, for an initial period of 2 years. In April 2013, the Orchestre Métropolitain announced the appointment of Kuerti as its first-ever principal guest conductor, with an initial contract of 3 years.

In 2018, Kuerti became the music director at the Kalamazoo Symphony Orchestra.
