= Marc Bélanger (musician) =

Canadian violinist (born 1940)

- Born: 30 July 1940 (age 86); Quebec City
- Education: Conservatoire de musique du Québec à Québec; Accademia Musicale Chigiana
- Occupations: violinist violist conductor arranger composer music educator
- Father: Edwin Bélanger
- Relatives: Guy Bélanger (siblings)

Marc Bélanger (born 30 July 1940) is a Canadian violinist, violist, conductor, arranger, composer, and music educator.

== Life and career ==
Born in Quebec City, Bélanger is the son of violinist and conductor Edwin Bélanger and the brother of musician Guy Bélanger. It is from his father that he received his initial musical training. At the age of eight he began studying the violin with Calvin Sieb and singing with Claude Létourneau at the Conservatoire de musique du Québec à Québec. He continued to study at the conservatoire through 1961, earning a diploma in 1960 with premier prizes in both harmony and chamber music. He also studied conducting at the Accademia Musicale Chigiana under Hermann Scherchen.

Bélanger began his career working as an ensemble musician, conductor, and arranger for the Canadian Broadcasting Corporation. Between 1956 and 1971 he played the violin and viola in various orchestras at the CBC in Quebec and from 1972 to 1976 he played in the CBC Orchestra in Montreal. From 1958 to 1972 he was a member of the Quebec Symphony Orchestra; notably serving as the ensemble's principal violist from 1969 to 1972. In 1981 he played an instrumental role in establishing the Orchestre Métropolitain (OM) in Montreal; serving as the OM's first musical director from 1981 to 1986 and then artistic director in 1986–1987. At Expo 86 he was a guest soloist with the Vancouver Symphony Orchestra for the inauguration gala of the Canadian Pavilion. He later served for several years as the principal violinist of the Sherbrooke Symphony Orchestra and the Orchestre de chambre de l'Estrie.

Bélanger's compositional output consists of several instrumental works, of which his Divertissement (1969) for string quartet is his best known. From 1966 to 1979 he was a member of Gilles Vigneault's ensemble and he arranged many musical works for that group. In 1976 he founded the Groupe Marc Bélanger, a 10-musician ensemble which used electrified instruments. The ensemble's LP record Les Cordes en liberté features several compositions by Bélanger. In 1977 he orchestrated the music for André Gagnon's ballet Mad Shadows.

In 1971 Bélanger joined the faculty of the Conservatoire de musique du Québec à Montréal where he taught courses in viola, violin, and arranging and directed the jazz ensemble through 1977. From 1973 to 1979 he also taught viola and chamber music at the University of Montreal. In 1991 he began teaching at the Cégep de Drummondville where he is a violin instructor and leads the string orchestra.
