= Thirteen Strings =

Thirteen Strings is a chamber orchestra in Ottawa, Ontario, Canada. It was founded in 1976 by Brian Law, then conductor of the Ottawa Symphony Orchestra, who led the ensemble until 1991. Its initial members were drawn from the National Arts Centre Orchestra. After Law left in 1991, various guest conductors directed the ensemble, including Calvin Sieb. Jean-François Rivest was the Artistic Director from 1999 to 2006. The Artistic Director in 2012 was Kevin Mallon. The performances are often supplemented by vocal or instrumental soloists. The ensemble performs in such venues as St Andrew's Presbyterian Church and Dominion-Chalmers United Church.

Thirteen strings also organizes Junior Thirteen Strings, which consists of Ottawa region string players aged 12–17 selected to play with the Thirteen Strings in a concert during their regular season.

== Composition of the Thirteen Strings ==
In 2012, the Thirteen Strings' members were Martine Dubé, Andréa Armijo Fortrin, and Manuela Milani as violin I; Brigitte Amyot, Maria Nenoiu, David Thies-Thompson, and Solange Tremblay as violin II; Guylaine Lamaire and Peter Webster on viola; Julian Armour and Thaddeus Morden on cello; and Hilda Cowie on bass, with additional non-string members Louis-Pierre Bergeron (horn), Marie Bouchard (harpsichord), Julie Paul (oboe), and Camille Churchfield and Christian Paquette (flute).
