= Jean-Pierre Montminy =

Canadian military bandmaster and clarinetist

Jean-Pierre Montminy CD (23 October 1934 – 14 March 2017) was a Canadian military bandmaster and clarinetist.

== Life and career ==
He was born in October 1934 in Saint-Gilles, Quebec, just east of Montreal. Upon graduation secondary school, he entered the Conservatoire de musique du Québec à Montréal where he was a clarinet student. He began his military career in the Regular Force in 1955, serving in the HMCS Cornwallis and Stadacona Bands as well an army band in London, Ontario for the next 20 years. In 1975, he graduated from the assistant director of music course at CFB Esquimalt, immediately upon graduating becoming the Assistant Director of Music of the Royal Canadian Regiment Band from 1975-1976 and later as Director of Music of the band 1978-1980, having served in the latter position while at the rank of a Captain. He was transferred to the La Musique du Royal 22e Régiment at the Citadelle of Quebec where he would briefly be stationed before going to Ottawa to work in the Directorate of Ceremonial of the National Defence Headquarters in 1982. He was appointed the director of the Princess Patricia's Canadian Light Infantry Band in 1984, a band he would lead in Calgary before moving to head the Canadian Forces School of Music in CFB Borden.

He retired to Rockland at the turn of the decade although he continued to direct the Reserve Force Bands for another year and remaining active with local civilian bands. He died on 14 March 2017 at the age of 83.
