= Charles O'Neill (musician) =

Canadian bandmaster, composer, organist, cornetist and music educator (1882–1964)

- Born: 31 August 1882; Duntocher
- Died: 9 September 1964 (aged 82)
- Education: Bachelor of Music
- Alma mater: McGill University
- Occupations: bandmaster, composer, organist, cornetist and music educator

Charles O'Neill (31 August 1882 – 9 September 1964) was a Canadian bandmaster, composer, organist, cornetist and music educator of Scottish birth and Irish parentage. Although he wrote many symphonic and choral works, the majority of his compositional output was devoted to band music.

== Education and early career ==
Born in Duntocher to Irish parents, O'Neill began his musical training in the piano as a young child. He then studied the organ with Albert Lister Peace in Glasgow and music theory with Archibald Evans in London. From 1897 to 1901 he serves as organist at Grimsby, Lincolnshire and was a cornet player in a local band in that city.

In 1901, O'Neill moved to the United States, settling first in Boston, Massachusetts and then in New York City in 1903. He moved again in 1905 to Kingston, Ontario in Canada, where he played in the Royal Canadian Horse Artillery Band as a cornet soloist. In 1908, he returned to England to receive training as a bandmaster for at the Royal Military School of Music at Kneller Hall through the support of the Canadian Department of National Defence.

After earning a diploma from the RMSM in 1909, O'Neill returned to Canada in 1910 to succeed Joseph Vézina in the post of music director of the Royal Canadian Garrison Artillery Band at the Citadelle of Quebec. He obtained the rank of captain in 1919. While directing the band he pursued further studies in music composition and theory with Herbert Sanders in Ottawa and then entered the music program at McGill University. He earned a Bachelor of Music degree from McGill in 1914. Ten years later he earned a Doctor of Music from McGill with an emphasis in composition. He composed his largest work, the cantata The Ancient Mariner for chorus and orchestra, for his doctoral exercise.

== Conductor, bandmaster, and adjudicator ==
In 1922, O'Neill was appointed the director of the band of the newly formed Royal 22nd Regiment; a post he held for the next 15 years. The band was selected as the featured band of the 1927 Canadian National Exhibition, and he later conducted the Composite Permanent Force Band of Canada at the CNE in 1930. He also served regularly as an adjudicator at the CNE from 1923 on. In 1928 he was a co-adjudicator with John Philip Sousa and Edwin Franko Goldman at the US State and National Band Contests. He was also the vice president of the Dominion College of Music during the 1920s and 1930s.

From 1933 to 1934, O'Neill served as the president of the American Bandmasters Association. From 1935 to 1937, he was the conductor of the Canadian Broadcasting Corporation's orchestra in Quebec. He also worked as a guest conductor with several orchestras in Canada and the United States. In 1937, he was a guest conductor at the coronation of George VI of the United Kingdom in London.

== Later career and retirement ==
O'Neill resigned from his post with the Royal 22nd Regiment in 1937 in order to take a position on the faculty of the Crane School of Music at the State University of New York at Potsdam where he taught music composition and conducting through 1947. He served as the head of the school's music department from 1942 to 1947. During these years he also served as the director of the summer music program and a summer school instructor at the University of Wisconsin.

In 1948, O'Neill returned to Canada to join the music theory and composition faculty at The Royal Conservatory of Music in Toronto. He taught there until his retirement in 1954. He served as honorary president of the Canadian Band Association from 1960 to 1964. He lived the remainder of his life in Quebec City and continued to compose up until his death in September, 1964 at the age of 82.
