= Laub–Petschnikoff Stradivarius =

The Laub–Petschnikoff Stradivarius is an antique violin made by the Italian luthier Antonio Stradivari of Cremona (1644–1737), which is variously dated as from 1722 and 1727. It is one of only 700 known surviving Stradivarius instruments.

== History ==
It was once owned and played by Ferdinand Laub (1832–1875) and later by Alexander Petschnikoff (1873–1948), to whom it was given by Princess Ourosoff.

In the early 1960s, the Laub–Petschnikoff was acquired by Rembert Wurlitzer, a New York City dealer of fine string instruments. It was then purchased by Canadian philanthropist J. W. McConnell, who donated the instrument to the Montreal Symphony Orchestra in 1961 for use by the concertmaster, then Calvin Sieb. Sieb subsequently purchased the violin, which was estimated to be worth $500,000 in 1984. Yehudi Menuhin performed with it at a concert in Montreal in 1963, after his own violin broke a string.

== Description ==
The back is maple and the front is spruce. Unusually, the maple used is thought to come from Turkey. In Fritz Meyer's Famous Violins and their Fates (1920), the violin is described as resembling the Sarasate "Lieblingsgeige", with an "ingratiating singing voice" and an "indescribably sweet inner quality" for which according to Meyer, it was globally known. Henry C. Lahee described it in 1899 as "magnificent", commenting that it was then "said to be the most costly instrument in existence". In 1968, Jacob Siskind described the violin as an "ideal" orchestral instrument but considered it to lack a "large enough or sufficiently penetrating sound" when playing the solo part in a concerto, as its sound "blends too easily with that of the orchestra and is often lost completely."
