= Ronald J. Belanger =

American politician

Member of the New Hampshire House of Representatives from the Rockingham 20th district
- In office 1982–1984

Member of the New Hampshire House of Representatives from the Rockingham 26th district
- In office 1994–2002

Member of the New Hampshire House of Representatives from the Rockingham 76th district
- In office 2002–2004

Member of the New Hampshire House of Representatives from the Rockingham 4th district
- In office 2004–2012

Member of the New Hampshire House of Representatives from the Rockingham 8th district
- In office 2012–2017

Personal details
- Born: June 15, 1939
- Died: July 14, 2017 (aged 78)
- Party: Democratic; Republican
- Education: Bunker Hill Community College

Ronald J. Belanger (June 15, 1939 – July 14, 2017) was an American politician. He served as a member of the New Hampshire House of Representatives.

== Life and career ==
Belanger attended Bunker Hill Community College.

Belanger served in the New Hampshire House of Representatives from 1982 to 1994 and again from 1994 to 2017.

Belanger died on July 14, 2017, at the age of 78.
