= Luc Bélanger =

Canadian ice hockey player

Luc Belanger
- Born: June 25, 1975 (age 49); Sherbrooke, Quebec, Canada
- Height: 5 ft 11 in (180 cm)
- Weight: 183 lb (83 kg; 13 st 1 lb)
- Position: Goaltender
- Catches: Left
- LNAH team Former teams: Thetford Mines Isothermic; AHL; Quebec Citadelles; ECHL; Mississippi Sea Wolves; LNAH; Sherbrooke Saint-François; Quebec RadioX; Pont Rouge Lois Jeans
- NHL draft: Undrafted
- Playing career: 2001–present

Luc Bélanger (born April 4, 1975) is a Canadian professional ice hockey goaltender who is currently playing with the Thetford Mines Isothermic in the Ligue Nord-Américaine de Hockey. Belanger played in the American Hockey League with the Quebec Citadelles during the 2001–02 AHL season.
