= Bellanger =

Bellanger is a French surname. Notable people with the surname include:

- Florian Bellanger (born 1968), French pastry chef
- Pierre Bellanger (born 1958), founder and CEO of Skyrock

== See also ==
- Bélanger
- Pont-Bellanger, a commune in Calvados, France
