= Yves Bélanger =

Yves Bélanger may refer to:

- Yves Bélanger (ice hockey) (born 1952), Canadian ice hockey player
- Yves Bélanger (cinematographer) (born 1960), Canadian cinematographer
