= Conservatoire de musique du Québec à Québec =

Music conservatory in Quebec City

- Abbreviation: CMQQ
- Formation: 1944
- Type: Conservatory
- Legal status: active
- Purpose: Professional training in music
- Headquarters: Quebec City, Quebec, Canada
- Location: 270, rue Jacques-Parizeau
- Coordinates: 46.8063°N 71.2219°W
- Region served: Quebec City, Quebec
- Official language: French
- Director: Jean-Fabien Schneider
- Parent organization: Conservatoire de musique et d'art dramatique du Québec
- Website: http://www.conservatoire.gouv.qc.ca

The Conservatoire de musique du Québec à Québec (French pronunciation: [kɔ̃sɛʁvatwaʁ də myzik dy kebɛk a kebɛk], CMQQ) is a music conservatory located in Quebec City, Quebec, Canada. Founded by the Quebec government in 1944, it became the second North American music institution of higher learning to be entirely state-subsidized. The conservatoire is part of a network of 7 conservatories in Quebec, the Conservatoire de musique et d'art dramatique du Québec (CMADQ), and was the second school in the CMADQ network to be established. Orchestra conductor Wilfrid Pelletier served as the school's first director from 1944 through 1946. The current director is Jean-Fabien Schneider.

== History ==
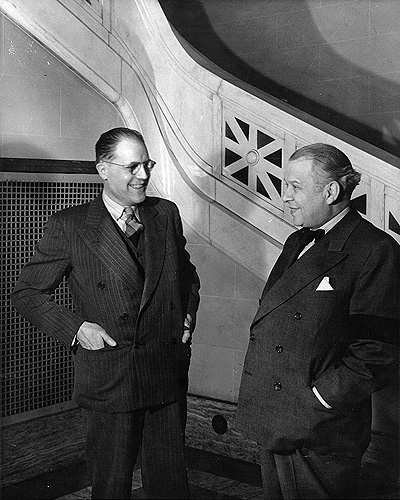
Claude Champagne (left) and Wilfrid Pelletier (right) at the opening of the Conservatoire de musique du Québec à Montréal in 1943.

At its founding, the CMQQ was located on Langelier Blvd, moving in 1950 to larger premises on Saint Denis Street near the Citadelle of Quebec. In October 1972 the CMQQ moved to its current home inside the Grand Théâtre de Québec. In 1991, the complex housed 49 classrooms, 70 teaching and practice studios, a multi-media centre with a recording studio and electroacoustic lab, and the performance space of the theatre itself. The complex is also home to an impressive library which in 1991 included more than 60,000 documents of books, scores, monographs, periodicals, and recordings in various media formats.

The CMQQ has a strong commitment to performance, and in addition to holding public concerts at the Grand Théâtre they also perform regularly at the nearby Salle Louis-Fréchette and Salle Octave-Crémazie performance halls, the Chapelle historique du Bon-Pasteur museum, and the Institut canadien de Québec. Both students and faculty regularly present public recitals in these venues, in addition to the many public concerts given by the school's orchestra, chamber orchestra, jazz band, wind ensemble, opera program, choirs, and other performance groups. The school offers courses in well over 50 areas of study, ranging from early music performance studies to electroacoustic music techniques, to chamber music, to ethnomusicology, and opera and jazz studies among many others. The school also regularly brings in guest instructors for master classes which are also open to the music students of Laval University.

During the late 1930s and early 1940s, Canadian composer Claude Champagne put together a large report on music education. This report was presented to the Quebec government by Champagne and Wilfrid Pelletier with the hopes of establishing Canadian institutes of higher learning for music. The report closely examined music education in Europe as well as in Canada and plans were soon formed to establish a network of state-subsidized school which would be modeled after European conservatories, particularly the Conservatoire de Paris. On 29 May 1942 The Conservatory Act ('Loi du conservatoire') was passed by the Legislative Assembly of Quebec which allocated a $30,000 budget to form the CMADQ's first school, the Conservatoire de musique du Québec à Montréal (CMQM). The CMQM opened its doors in January 1943 with Pelletier as the school's first director and Champagne its first assistant director.

With the successful opening of the CMQM, the CMADQ, under Pelletier's leadership, began plans to establish a similar conservatory in Quebec City. These plans were swiftly carried out and the school's first day of classes occurred on 17 January 1944. Most of the conservatoire's original faculty were also teachers at the CMQM and commuted back and forth between the two schools during its early years. Henri Gagnon succeeded Pelletier as the school's second director in 1946 with organ professor Alice Duchesnay remaining on as the school's assistant director. Notable early staff members included Gilbert Darisse (violin), Maurice DeCelles (oboe), René Gagnieer (clarinet, trombone), Olga Gosselin (harp), Hélène Landry (piano), and Robert Talbot (theory) among others.

In 1961 Raoul Jobin succeeded Gagnon as director, and nine years later he was in turn succeeded by Paul-Émile Talbot in 1970. Armando Santiago served as director from 1978–1985, followed by Jean Charron (1985–1988) and Wilfrand Guillemette (1988-?).

== Notable alumni ==
- Gilles Auger, conductor
- Odette Beaupré, mezzo-soprano
- Larry Beauregard, flautist
- Denis Bédard, composer, organist and harpsichordist
- Marc Bélanger, conductor, violinist, violist, and arranger
- Guy Bélanger, tenor, conductor, composer, and opera director
- Françoys Bernier, pianist and conductor
- Madeleine Bernier, pianist
- Pierre Bourque, saxophonist
- Sylvain Doyon, organist and pianist
- Noëlla Genest, organist
- Gaston Germain, bass
- John Hawkins, composer
- Bernard Jean, oboist and conductor
- Philippe Magnan, oboist and English horn player
- Jacqueline Martel, soprano
- Sonia Racine, mezzo-soprano
- Patrick Saint-Denis, composer
- Jacques Simard, oboist

== See also ==
- Adine Fafard-Drolet, founder of an earlier Conservatory of Quebec
