= Robert Talbot (conductor) =

Canadian conductor, violinist and composer (1893–1954)

Jean Robert Talbot (2 December 1893 – 24 August 1954) was a Canadian conductor, violinist, violist, composer, and music educator. For more than 25 years, he was the conductor of the Société symphonique de Québec (now the Quebec Symphony Orchestra). A member of the Société française de musicologie, the International Musicological Society, the Musical Association of London, and the Diocesan Commission for Sacred Music, he was the author of several books on music theory. He also contributed music articles to a variety of periodicals.

His compositional output includes one symphony, a string quartet, several songs, many pieces for solo organ, the oratorio Évangéline, the opera Celle qui voit, and several other orchestral works. Many of his manuscripts, writings, and personal papers are part of the collection at the library of the Université Laval.

== Life and career ==
Born in Montmagny, Quebec, Talbot initially intended to become a lawyer and earned a law degree from the Université Laval in 1915. He then entered the Académie de musique du Québec, where he was a pupil of J.-Alexandre Gilbert, Berthe Roy, and Joseph Vézina. From the academy, he earned a diplôme supérieur (1917), a lauréat diploma (1918), and a teaching certificate (1919). From 1919 to 1922, he studied in New York City at the Institute of Musical Art (now the Juilliard School) where he was a pupil of Franz Kneisel, Albert Stoessel, and Louis Svečenski. He later earned a Doctor of Music from Laval in 1933.

In the summer of 1922, Talbot left New York City and embarked upon a violin recital tour throughout the Western provinces of Canada. He had returned home the year before to perform with his short-lived string quartet, the Schubert String Quartet. In 1924, he founded the Talbot String Quartet. He joined the faculty of the Université Laval the following autumn as a professor of harmony and violin. He concurrently served as the School of Music's secretary from 1922 to 1935 and director from 1932 until his death in Quebec City in 1954.

Among his notable students were Maurice Blackburn, François Brassard, Gilbert Darisse, and Marthe Lapointe.

From 1924 to 1942, Talbot served as the director of the Société symphonique de Québec (SSQ). Under his leadership, the orchestra significantly expanded its repertoire. For the SSQ's 25th-anniversary concert in May 1928, he led the ensemble in its first complete presentation of Ludwig van Beethoven's Symphony No. 5. He also added Johannes Brahms's Symphony No. 3, Antonín Dvořák's New World Symphony, Gabriel Fauré's Masques et bergamasques, César Franck's Symphony in D minor, Pyotr Ilyich Tchaikovsky's The Nutcracker, and Richard Wagner's Prelude from Die Meistersinger von Nürnberg among many other major works. In 1931, he conducted the orchestra's radio debut.
