= La Musique du Royal 22e Régiment =

La Musique du Royal 22^{e} Régiment
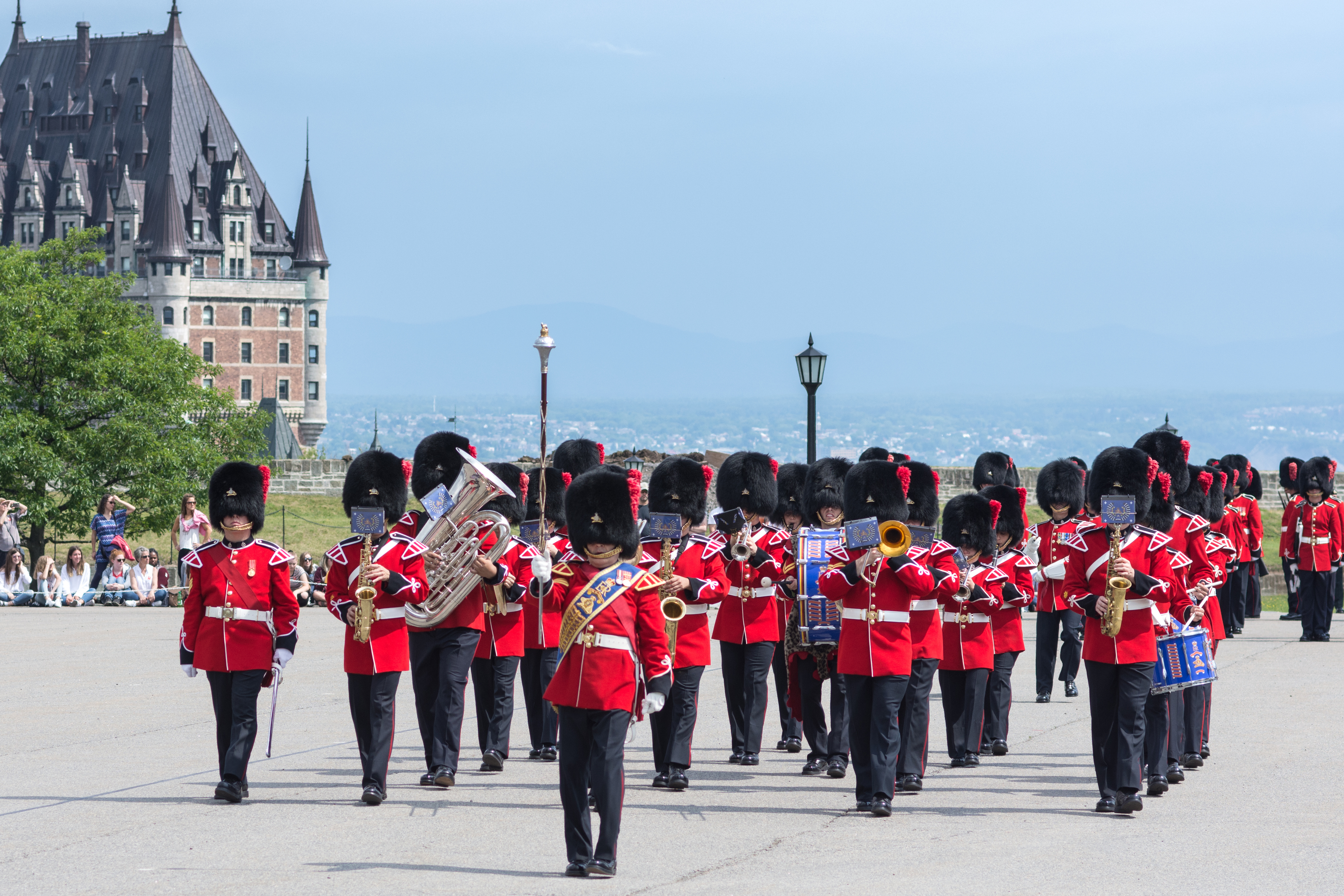
- The band at the Citadelle of Quebec in June 2018.
- Active: 1922–present
- Country: Canada
- Branch: Canadian Army
- Type: Military band
- Size: 35 members
- Part of: 2nd Canadian Division Support Group
- Headquarters: CFB Valcartier, Quebec
- March: Quick: "Vive la Canadienne"; Slow: "Marche lente du Royal 22^{e} Régiment : La Prière en famille"
- Anniversaries: June 4
- Website: canada.ca/en/army/corporate/2-canadian-division/la-musique-du-royal-22e-regiment.html

Commanders
- Commanding Officer: Captain Vincent Roy

The Royal 22^{e} Régiment Band is the regimental band of the Royal 22nd Regiment. It is based at CFB Valcartier (Valcartier Garrison) in Quebec and is assigned to the 2nd Canadian Division Support Group. It is the only French-speaking regular military band in Canada.

== History ==
The regimental band was formed in Quebec City in 1922 with the 20 members of the former Royal Canadian Artillery Band. A year later, the band began performing at the Orpheum Theatre, in Quebec City and on radio station CKAC in Montreal. During World War II the ensemble gave performances primarily to encourage recruitment. The band has performed for the coronations of two Canadian monarchs (George VI in 1937 and Elizabeth II in 1953). It was present at the 300th, 350th, and 400th anniversary of Quebec City. The band resided at the Quebec’s Citadel until 1988, after which time it moved to the Canadian Forces Base at Valcartier near Quebec City. Following a reorganization of Canadian military bands in July 1994, the regimental band was dissolved. 3 years later, it was reestablished. The band joined the ranks of the 2nd Canadian Division Support Group in 2006.

== Notable activities ==
- The band has participated in the guard mounting ceremony at the Citadelle of Québec continuously since 1945.
- In 1967, the band was one of 17 bands that took part in the Canadian Armed Forces Tattoo.
- For a number of years, the band, along with the Musique des Voltigeurs de Québec, hosted the Quebec City International Festival of Military Bands.
- In 2007, the band marched in O'Higgins Park in Santiago de Chile during the Great Military Parade of Chile.
- In 2008, the band took part in a parade as well as other events related to the 400th anniversary of Quebec City.
- The International Anthem of the Royal Golf Clubs, which commissioned by Lieutenant Governor of Quebec, was premiered by the band on 12 September 2017.
- In February 2019, the band's brass quintet performed in Kuujjuaq in the first visit of a military band in northern Quebec.
- In December 2019, the band has been part of the Canadian delegation deployed in Italy to commemorate the 75th anniversary of the Italian campaign (World War II).

== Conductors ==
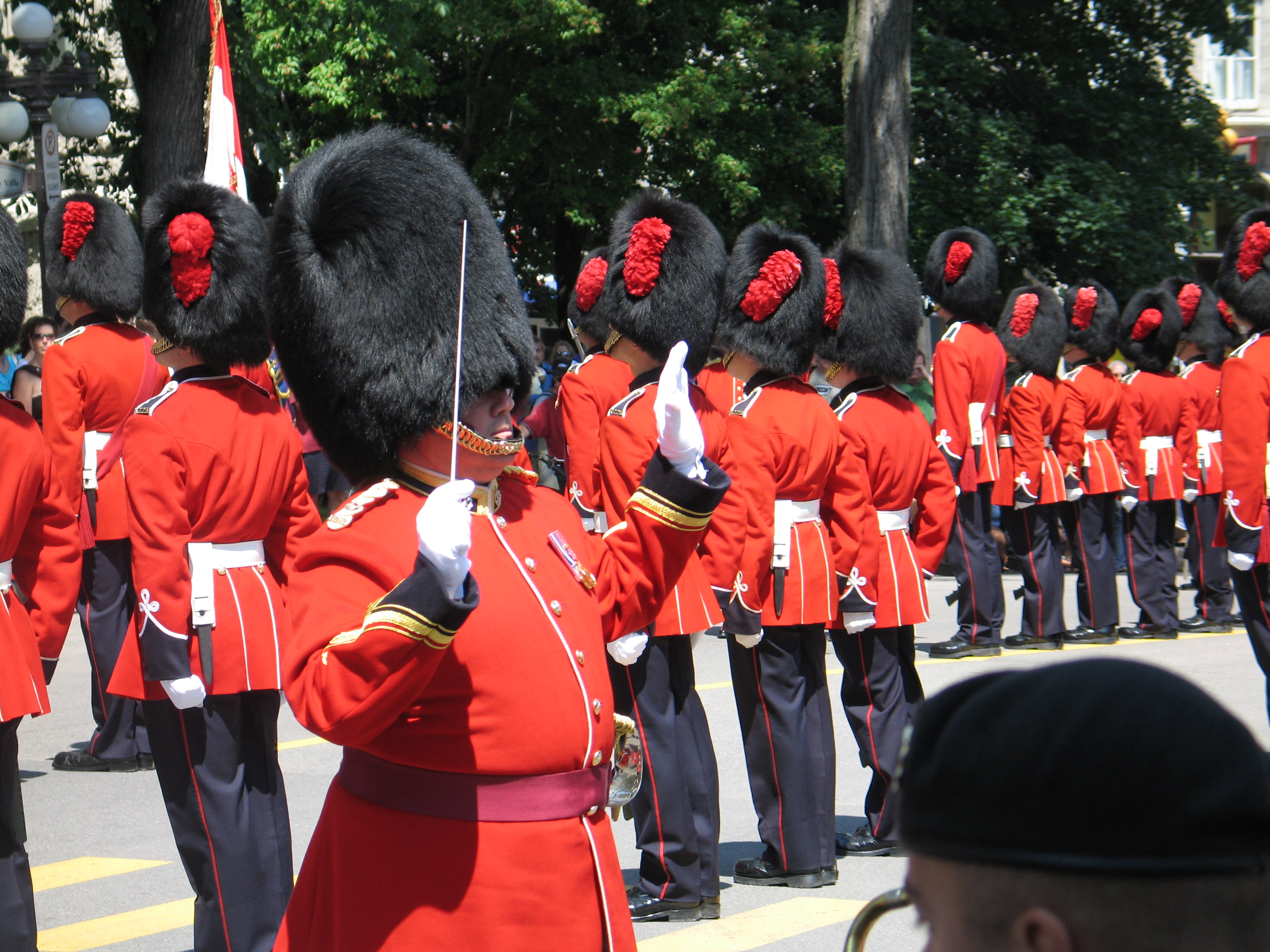
Major J. Destrempes (conductor and commanding officer of the band from 2002–2008) leading the band during the Freedom of the City ceremony in 2006

- Captain Charles O'Neill (1922–1937)
- Captain E. Bélanger (1937–1961)
- Captain Joseph Pierre Armand Ferland (1961–1965)
- Major Jean-François Pierret (1965–1978)
- Major Charles Villeneuve (1978–1980)
- Captain Jean-Pierre Montminy (1980–1982)
- Captain A. Dion (1982–1986)
- Captain D. Bouchard (1986–1990)
- Major Denis Bernier (1990–1994 and 1997–2002)
- Major J. Destrempes (2002–2008)
- Major Patrick Picard (2008–2012)
- Major Eric Gagnon (2012–2016)
- Captain Christian Richer (2016–2018)
- Captain Vincent Roy (2018–present)

== See also ==
- Governor General's Foot Guards Band
- Canadian Grenadier Guards Band
- Royal Military College of Canada Bands
