= Joseph Vézina =

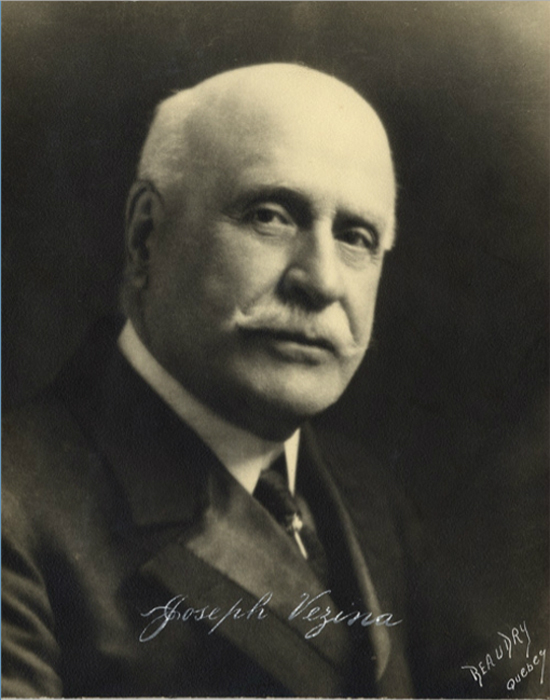
Joseph Vézina

François-Joseph Vézina (June 11, 1849 in Quebec City – October 5, 1924 in Quebec City) was a Quebec conductor, composer, organist and music professor. Vézina is buried in the Cimetière Notre-Dame-de-Belmont in Sainte-Foy.

== Early life ==
Vézina, born in 1849, was the son of François Vézina, a house painter and amateur musician who taught his son to play the piano. As a youngster, Vézina briefly studied under Calixa Lavallée but, for the most part, he was a self-taught musician.

== Career ==
Vézina's work as a musician began in military bands. In 1867, he joined the Voltigeurs de Québec and played the baritone horn for the Voltigeurs band. He took over the duty of bandmaster in 1868 and held it until 1879. Vézina later went on to found and direct a number of military, amateur and professional orchestras, most notably the Orchestre Symphonique de Québec (1902-until his death). On June 24, 1880, he conducted the first performance of O Canada which eventually became Canada's national anthem. Vézina was also an accomplished composer. His work includes three opéra comique: Le Lauréat (1906) — libretto by Félix-Gabriel Marchand — Le Rajah (1910) and Le Fétiche (1912). He died before completing a fourth opera: La Grosse Gerbe, adapted from a poem of Léon-Pamphile Le May.

Throughout his career, Vézina's work as a teacher, musician, conductor, composer and active champion for his art made him the central figure in Quebec City's cultural life. He helped found the music school of Laval University in 1922 and taught there until his death. His notable pupils included Henri Gagnon and Robert Talbot.
