= Orchestre Métropolitain =

Canadian symphony orchestra in Montreal

The Orchestre Métropolitain (French pronunciation: [ɔʁkɛstʁ metʁɔpɔlitɛ̃], OM) is a symphony orchestra in Montréal, Québec, formed in 1981. It performs primarily in the Montreal Symphony House at Place des Arts but also at Salle Wilfrid-Pelletier and Théâtre Maisonneuve. Outside the city centre the OM plays in Saint-Laurent, Outremont, Hochelaga-Maisonneuve, Rivière-des-Prairies–Pointe-aux-Trembles, Saint-Léonard, Verdun, Ahuntsic, Pierrefonds-Roxboro, and Pointe-Claire.

== History ==
The roots of the orchestra date to 1980, when the ensemble Les Variations became the official orchestra for the Concerts Lachine series. The ensemble consisted of young music graduates from Montreal conservatories. In 1981, Les Variations changed its name to the Orchestre Métropolitain du Grand Montréal, with Robert Savoie as its first chairman (until 1985) and Hun Bang as its first executive director (until 1987). The orchestra's first music director was Marc Bélanger, from 1981 to 1986. Bélanger also served as artistic director from 1986 to 1987. The orchestra gave occasional concerts for its first few years, and staged its first regular season of concerts in 1985.

The orchestra compressed its official name to the Orchestre Métropolitain in 1986. Also in 1986, the Choeur de l'Orchestre Métropolitain was formed, with Jacques Faubert as its first director. That same year, Agnès Grossmann became the OM's second music director, and its second artistic director the next year. She held both posts through 1995. During the 1980s and 1990s, the OM made a number of recordings for Radio-Canada and Analekta. In 1993, the OM began its free summer concerts in Montreal parks and also performed in the Métro for the first time.

Joseph Rescigno became the OM's artistic director in 1995, and held the post through 2000. Yannick Nézet-Séguin took up the post of artistic director in 2000. Nézet-Séguin has conducted the OM in several commercial recordings for the ATMA Classique label, including symphonies of Anton Bruckner and Gustav Mahler. In April 2013, the OM announced the appointment of Julian Kuerti as its first-ever principal guest conductor, with an initial contract of three years. In 2017, the orchestra made its first European tour, playing in Amsterdam, Cologne, Dortmund, Hamburg, Paris, and Rotterdam. Two years later, they toured four cities in the United States: Ann Arbor, Chicago, New York, and Philadelphia. Following several contract extensions with Nézet-Séguin, in September 2019, the OM announced its contract with Nézet-Séguin as a lifetime contract.

Members of the orchestra performed in Days of Happiness (Les Jours heureux), a 2023 drama film by Chloé Robichaud about an orchestral conductor.

== Recordings ==
In January 2005, the OM and Nézet-Séguin received three Opus awards from the Conseil québécois de la musique, two for their recording of Mahler's Symphony No. 4 and one for their concert performance of Alban Berg's Wozzeck. In October 2005, the OM received a Felix Prize from the ADISQ awards for their album of Kurt Weill, in collaboration with Diane Dufresne. In 2010, the OM won an Opus Award for their recording of Bruckner's Symphony No. 9.

== Music directors and artistic directors ==
- Marc Bélanger (1981–1986, Music Director; 1986–1987, Artistic Director)
- Agnès Grossmann (1986–1995, Music Director; 1988–1995, Artistic Director)
- Joseph Rescigno (1995–2000)
- Yannick Nézet-Séguin (2000–"for life")
