= Montreal Symphony Orchestra =

Canadian symphonic orchestra

- Orchestra
- Native name: Orchestre symphonique de Montréal
- Former name: Les Concerts Symphoniques
- Founded: 1935
- Location: Montreal, Quebec, Canada
- Concert hall: Montreal Symphony House
- Music director: Rafael Payare
- Website: www.osm.ca

The Montreal Symphony Orchestra (French: Orchestre symphonique de Montréal, or OSM) is a Canadian symphony orchestra based in Montreal, Quebec, Canada. The orchestra’s home is the Montreal Symphony House at Place des Arts.

== History ==
Several orchestras were precursor ensembles to the current OSM. One such orchestra was formed in 1894 performed its concerts at Windsor Hall until the end of the 1902-1903 season. Another was established in 1930, which lasted eleven. The current orchestra directly traces its roots back to 1934, when Wilfrid Pelletier formed an ensemble called Les Concerts Symphoniques. This ensemble gave its first concert January 14, 1935, under conductor Rosario Bourdon. The orchestra acquired its current name in 1954. In the early 1960s, as the Orchestra was preparing to move to new facilities at Place des Arts, patron and prominent Montreal philanthropist, John Wilson McConnell, purchased the 1727 Laub-Petschnikoff Stradivarius violin for Calvin Sieb, the Symphony's concertmaster.

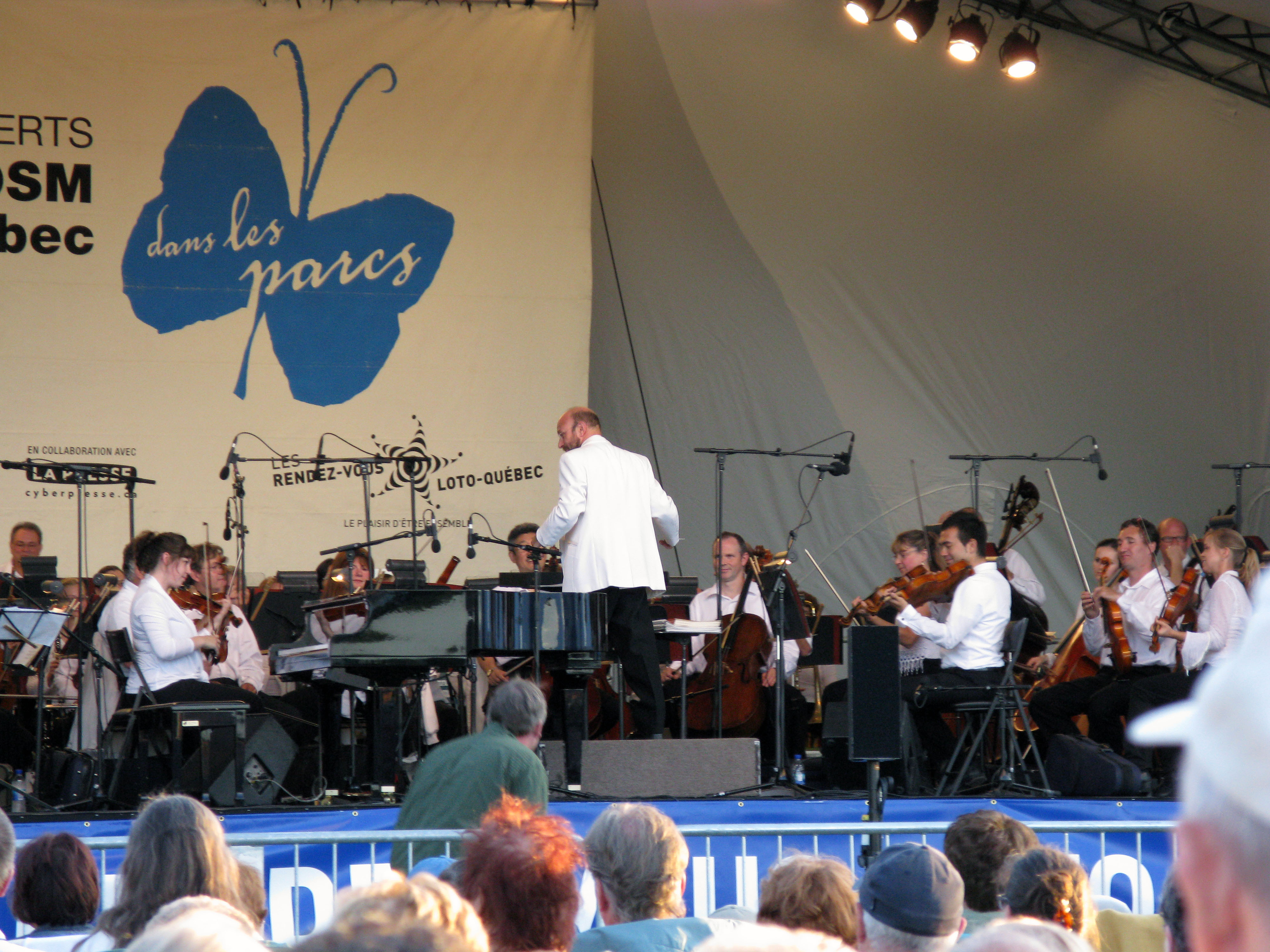
Outdoor concert of the Montreal Symphony Orchestra with conductor Jean-François Rivest in the borough of Pierrefonds-Roxboro in August 2008.

The orchestra has begun touring and some recording in the 1960s and early 1970s, during the tenures of Zubin Mehta and Franz-Paul Decker. During the music directorship of Rafael Frühbeck de Burgos (1975–1976) the OSM received its first invitation to perform at Carnegie Hall. However, Frühbeck de Burgos had rejected the composition Fleuves by Gilles Tremblay, which Tremblay had composed for tour performances by the OSM. In addition, Frühbeck de Burgos was quoted in print in La Presse as expressing public criticism of selected OSM musicians. The ensuing controversy led to Frühbeck de Burgos' resignation. (When Frühbeck de Burgos returned as a guest conductor in 2002, he apologised for his earlier behaviour.)

Conducting dates opened up after Frühbeck de Burgos' departure, and one of the slots went to Charles Dutoit. Dutoit subsequently became music director of the OSM in 1977. Dutoit had struck a friendship with the London/Decca records producer Ray Minshull, which led to a twenty-year recording partnership with Decca/London. During this period, Dutoit and the OSM released many recordings and embarked on tours of North America, Europe, Asia, and South America. Most notable among this discography are the recordings of the French repertoire, especially the music of Maurice Ravel, as well as works of Stravinsky and Debussy. The OSM and Dutoit won various awards for their recordings, including the Grand Prix du Président de la République (France) and the Prix mondial du Disque de Montreux. The OSM won Grammy awards in 1996 for its recording of Hector Berlioz' Les Troyens and in 2000 for Sergei Prokofiev and Béla Bartók piano concerti with Martha Argerich on EMI. It has additionally won a number of Juno Awards and Felix Awards. The London/Decca recordings ceased in the late 1990s due to market changes in the classical recording industry.

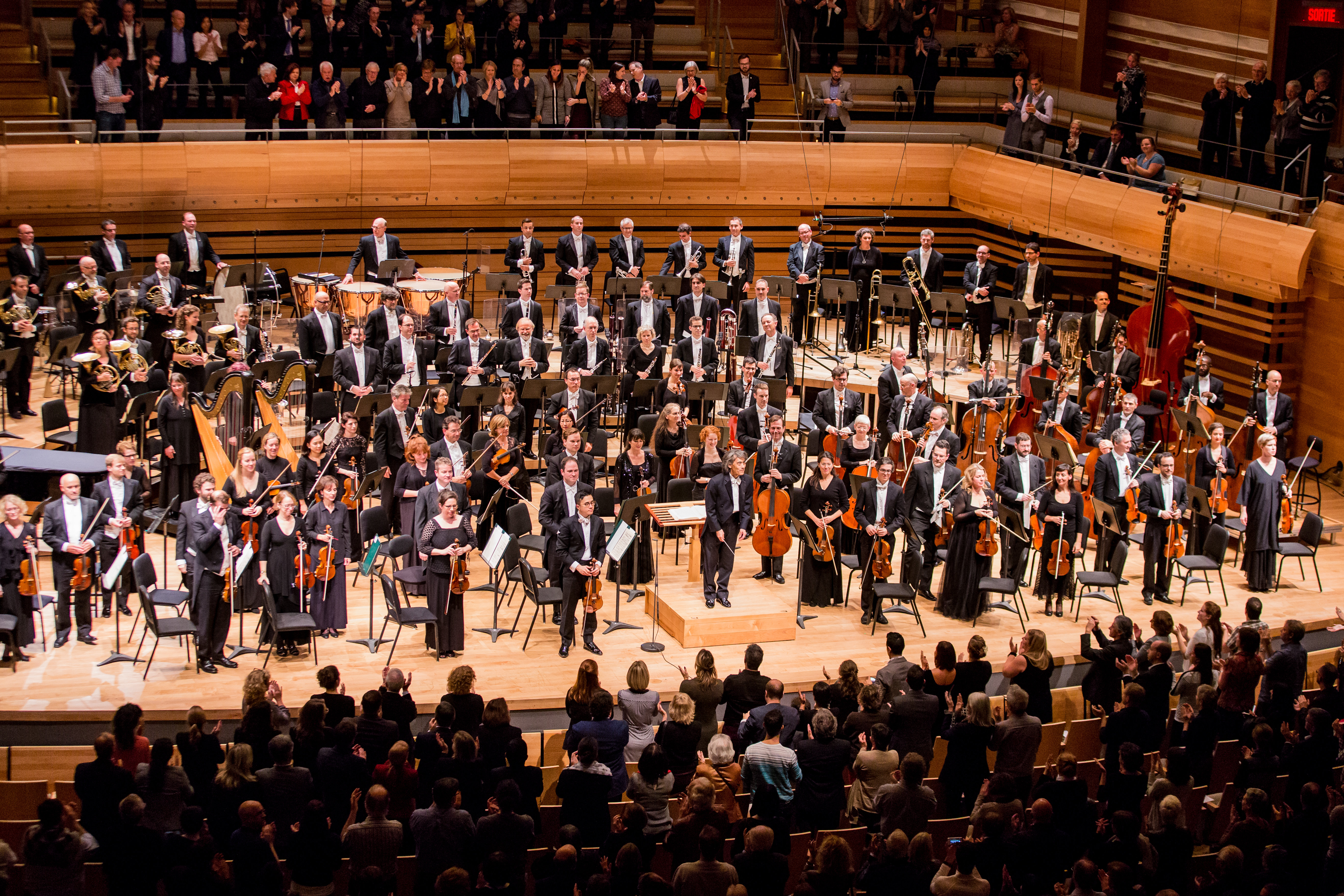
The Montreal Symphony Orchestra after a performance under Kent Nagano. The octobass can be seen at the far right (tall neck with three tuning pegs).

In 1998, OSM musicians took strike action for three weeks that was resolved largely due to the personal relationship between Dutoit and Lucien Bouchard, then the premier of Quebec. In 2002, Dutoit abruptly resigned as music director, following a long-simmering dispute between Dutoit and the OSM musicians. Dutoit did not return to the OSM as a guest conductor until 2016.

Following the departure of Dutoit, Jacques Lacombe was principal guest conductor of the OSM, from 2002 to 2006. In March 2003, the orchestra announced the appointment Kent Nagano as its new music director, starting in 2006. He gave his first concert in Montreal as music director-designate on 30 March 2005. Later in 2005, the OSM's musicians took industrial action, where this work stoppage lasted five months, ending shortly before Nagano's first scheduled concerts. With the OSM, Nagano conducted commercial recordings for such labels as ECM New Series and Analekta. During his tenure, the OSM acquired an octobass, the only orchestra in the world with a functioning octobass. In June 2017, the OSM announced that Nagano is to stand down from as its music director at the close of his current contract, at the end of the 2019–2020 season. Nagano concluded his OSM music directorship at the close of the 2019–2020 season, with the scheduled final concerts of his tenure curtailed by the COVID-19 pandemic.

In 2018, the orchestra toured several Cree and Inuit communities in Nord-du-Québec to perform Chaakapesh: The Trickster's Quest, an indigenous opera by Tomson Highway and Matthew Ricketts. The tour was documented by Roger Frappier and Justin Kingsley in the 2019 documentary film Chaakapesh.

In 2018, Rafael Payare first guest-conducted the OSM. He returned as guest conductor in 2019. In January 2021, the OSM announced the appointment of Payare as its next music director, effective with the 2022–2023 season, with an initial contract of 5 seasons. He held the title of music director-designate in the 2021–2022 season. In April 2026, the OSM announced the extension of Payare's contract as its music director through the 2031-2032 season.

Madeleine Careau has been chief executive officer of the OSM since February 2000. Careau is scheduled to stand down from the post in June 2024. In May 2024, the OSM announced the appointment of Mélanie La Couture as its next CEO.

Additional work by the OSM has included a collaboration with Les Cowboys Fringants on the 2023 live album En concert avec l’Orchestre symphonique de Montréal (sous la direction du chef Simon Leclerc), which won the Juno Award for Francophone Album of the Year at the Juno Awards of 2024.

== Music directors and leaders ==
- Wilfrid Pelletier (1935–1940)
- Désiré Defauw (1941–1952)
- Otto Klemperer (1950–1953; Artistic Advisor)
- Igor Markevitch (1957–1961)
- Zubin Mehta (1961–1967)
- Franz-Paul Decker (1967–1975)
- Rafael Frühbeck de Burgos (1975–1976)
- Charles Dutoit (1977–2002)
- Kent Nagano (2006–2020)
- Rafael Payare (2022–present)

=== Conductors Emeriti ===
- Wilfrid Pelletier
- Zubin Mehta
- Kent Nagano (2021)

== See also ==
- St. Lawrence Choir
- John Zirbel
