= Orchestre Symphonique de Québec =

Canadian orchestra

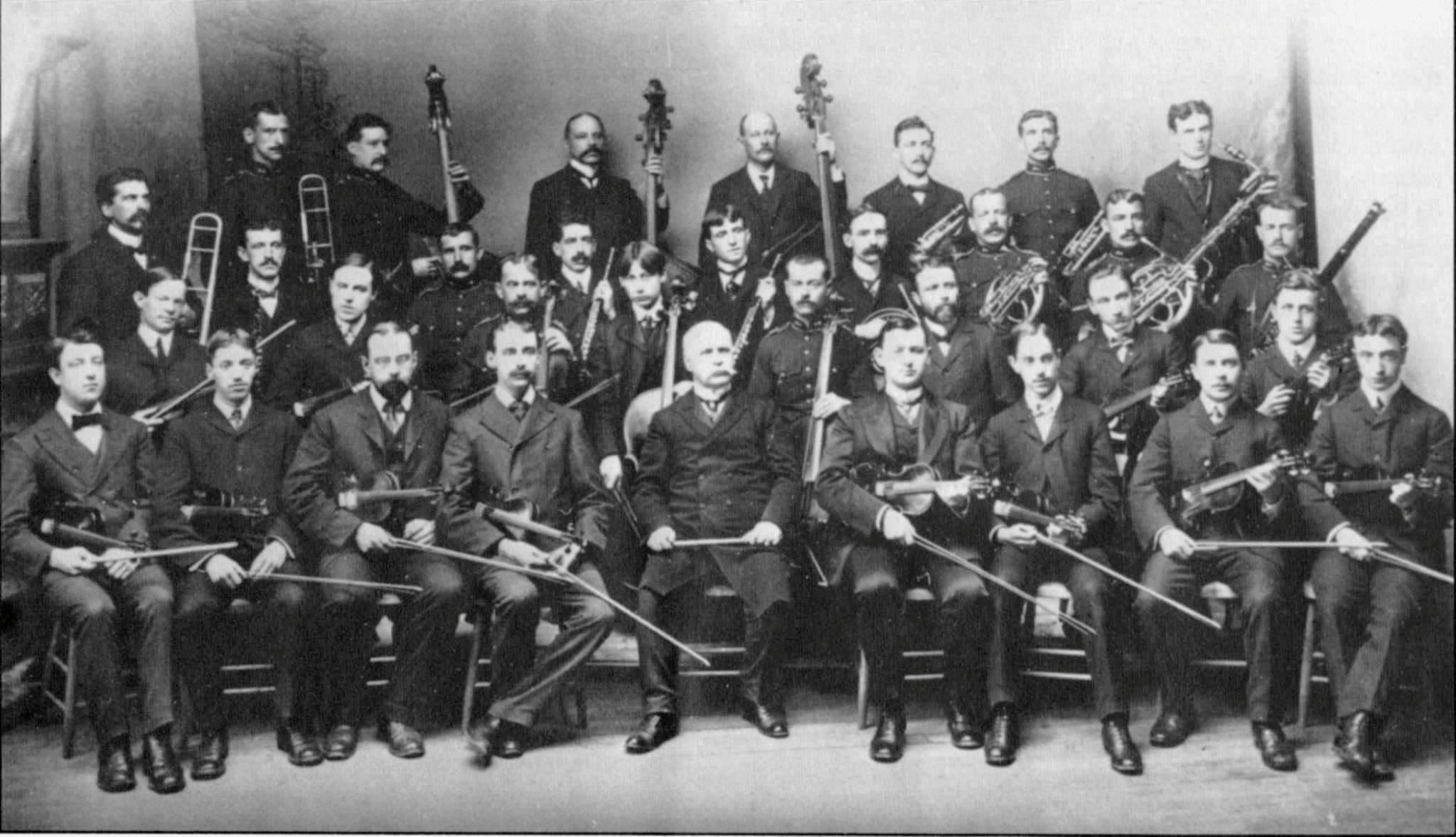
Orchestre symphonique de Québec with, music director, Joseph Vézina

The Orchestre symphonique de Québec (French pronunciation: [ɔʁkɛstʁ sɛ̃fɔnik də kebɛk], OSQ; English: Quebec Symphony Orchestra) is a Canadian symphony orchestra based in Quebec City. The orchestra also performs with the Théâtre lyrique du Québec (Théâtre lyrique de Nouvelle-France), the Opéra de Québec, and the Choeur symphonique de Québec.

== History ==
Founded in 1902 as the Société symphonique de Québec, the OSQ is the oldest active Canadian orchestra. Joseph Vézina was the OSQ's first music director, from 1902 to 1924. In 1942, the orchestra merged with rival orchestra Cercle philharmonique de Québec (founded 1936), at which time it changed its name to the Orchestre Symphonique de Québec.

The orchestra holds an annual competition for young Quebec musicians awarding monetary prizes as well as the opportunity to perform as a soloist with the orchestra.

The most recent Canadian music director of the OSQ was Françoys Bernier, from 1966 to 1968. Yoav Talmi was music director from 1998 to 2011 and now has the title of chef émérite (conductor emeritus) with the orchestra. In December 2011, the OSQ announced the appointment of Fabien Gabel as its 11th music director, as of the 2012–2013 season, with an initial contract of 4 years. The orchestra's most recent music director, Gabel concluded his tenure as OSQ music director at the close of the 2020–2021 season. After the close of Gabel's tenure, Bramwell Tovey served as principal guest conductor of the OSQ in the interim until his death in July 2022.

In December 2022, the OSQ announced the appointment of Clemens Schuldt as its next music director, effective September 2023, with an initial contract of four seasons.

== Music directors ==
- Joseph Vézina (1902–1924)
- Robert Talbot (1924–1942)
- Edwin Bélanger (1942–1951)
- Wilfrid Pelletier (1951–1966)
- Françoys Bernier (1966–1968)
- Pierre Dervaux (1968–1975)
- James DePreist (1976–1983)
- Simon Streatfeild (1983–1991)
- Pascal Verrot (1991–1998)
- Yoav Talmi (1998–2011)
- Fabien Gabel (2012–2021)
- Clemens Schuldt (2023–present)

== Discography ==
- Roger Matton: Mouvement symphonique I - Lekeu Adagio pour quatuor d'orchestre, Opus 3 - Milhaud Suite provençale. James DePreist conductor. Hidetaro Suzuki concertmaster. 1977. RCI 454/(Matton) 5-ACM 29
- Music of the Magical Realism, vol 2: Denys Bouliane Le Cactus rieur et la demoiselle qui souffrait d'une soif insatiable. Streatfeild conductor. 1991. SNE 567 (CD)
- André Prévost Le Conte de l'Oiseau - Haydn Toy Symphony. Berryman and Besré narrator, Duschenes conductor. 1984. SNE 518/(Prévost) 6-ACM 28
- El Cuento del Pajaro - Haydn Toy Symphony. Rodriguez and Barris narrator, Duschenes conductor. 1984. SNE 519
- The Tale of the Bird - Haydn Toy Symphony. Henry and Monette narrator, Duschenes conductor. 1983. SNE 505
- Dancing for 100 years (works by Bartók, Brahms, Champagne, François Dompierre and Antonín Dvořák. Yoav Talmi, conductor; Darren Lowe, violin. 2002. Analekta fl. FL 2 3156.
- André Mathieu's Concerto de Québec - Richard Addinsell's Warsaw Concerto - George Gershwin's Concerto in F. Yoav Talmi conductor, Alain Lefèvre piano. 2003. Analekta. AN 2 9814.
