= Airat Ichmouratov =

Volga Tatar-born Russian-Canadian composer, conductor and klezmer clarinetist (born 1973)

Airat Ichmouratov Айрат Ишмуратов
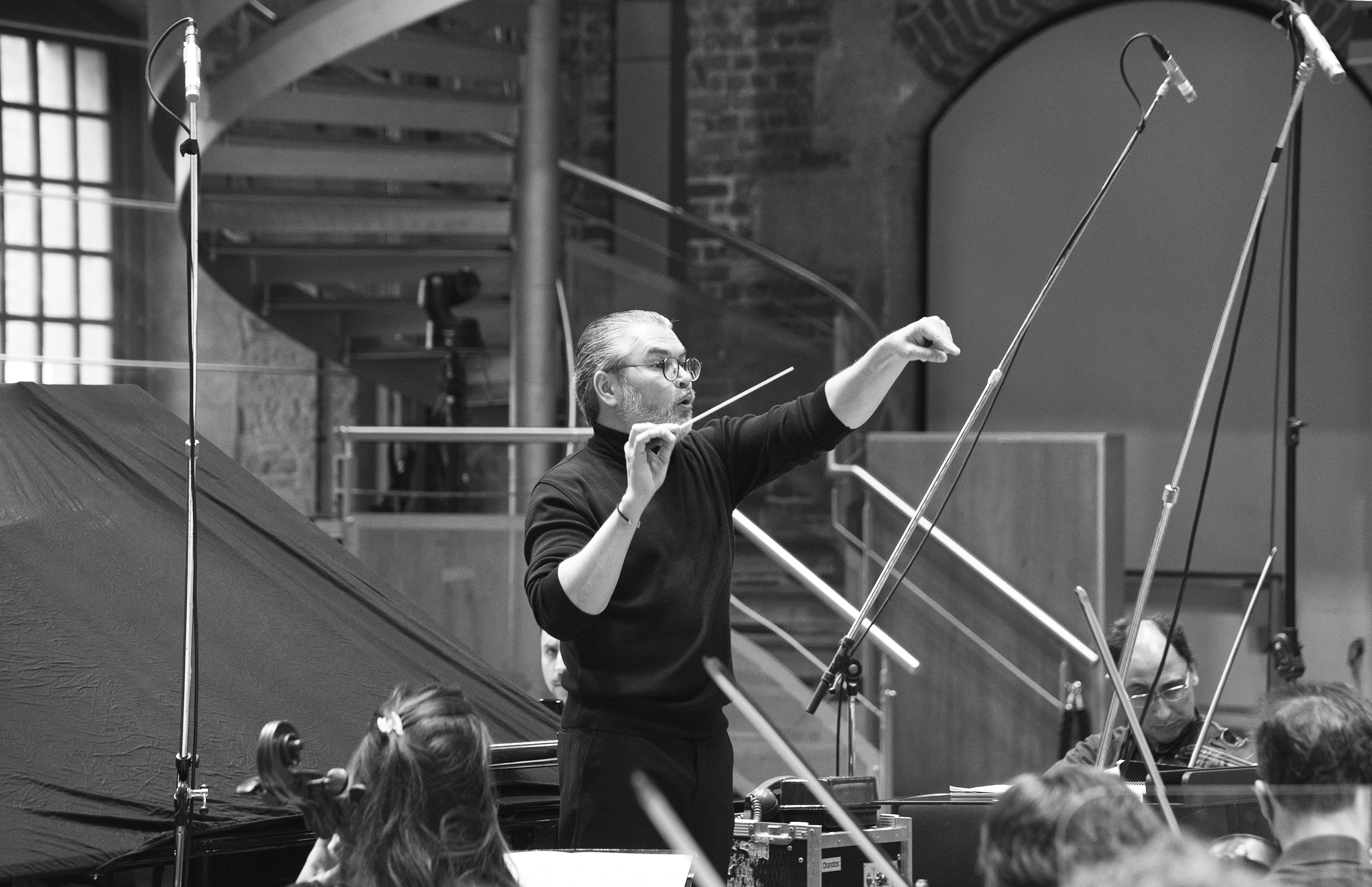
- Ichmouratov conducts the London Symphony Orchestra during the recording session of his Piano Concerto on 19 April 2022, St Luke's, London, UK
- Born: Airat Rafailovich Ichmouratov; 28 June 1973 (age 53); Kazan; Russia
- Citizenship: Canada, Russia
- Education: Kazan State Conservatory
- Occupations: Conductor, composer, klezmer clarinetist
- Years active: 1994–present
- Website: www.airatichmouratov.com

Airat Rafailovich Ichmouratov (Russian: Айрат Рафаилович Ишмуратов, Tatar Cyrillic: Айрат Рафаил улы Ишмурат, born 28 June 1973) is a Russian-born Canadian composer, conductor and klezmer clarinetist of Volga Tatar descent. He is a founding member and clarinetist of award-winning Montreal-based klezmer group Kleztory and invited professor at Laval University in Quebec, Canada.

== Early life ==
Ichmouratov was born and raised in Kazan, the capital and largest city of the Republic of Tatarstan, Russia. He is the second child of Razima Ichmouratova (Gatina) and Rafail Ichmouratov. Airat Ichmouratov is a representative of a well-known Tatar theatrical dynasty. His grandfather, Riza Fakhrutdinovich Ishmurat (Ishmuratov), was a playwright, publicist, and director. He was an Honored Artist of the RSFSR (Russian Soviet Federative Socialist Republic). His grandmother, Rashida Abdulazyanovna Ziganshina, was an actress at the Galiaskar Kamal Tatar Academic Theatre, as well as a playwright and public figure, and was a People's Artist of the Republic of Tatarstan and the Russian Federation.

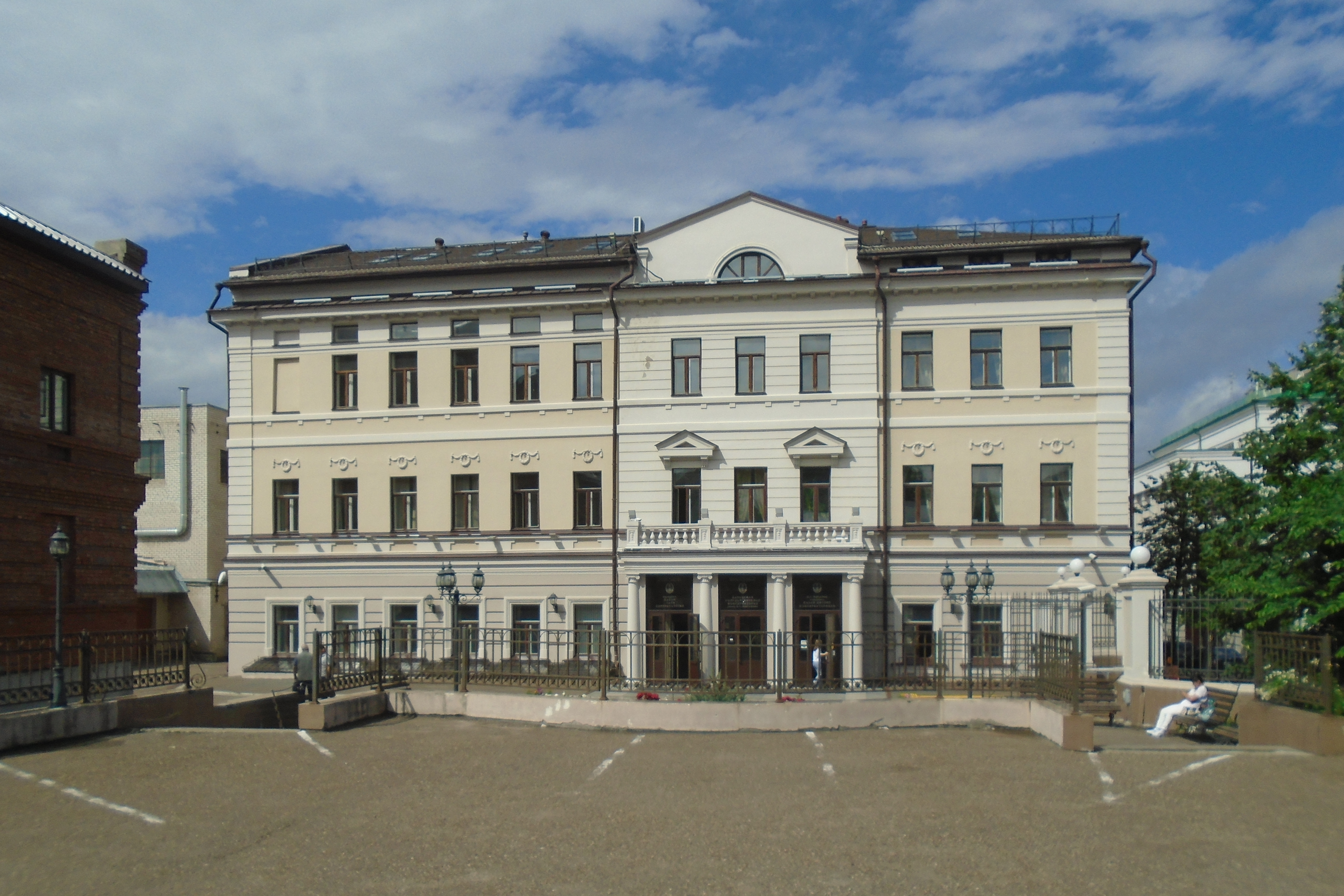
Kazan State Conservatory, from where Ichmouratov graduated in 1996.

At the age of seven, Ichmouratov began his musical education at Kazan Children's Music School No. 3, named after Röstäm Yaxin. There, he initially studied the recorder and, by the age of ten, he also took up the clarinet. His first teacher was Ildus Almazov, an Honored cultural worker of Tatarstan. He continued his studies at Kazan Music College named after I.V. Aukhadeev, and Kazan Conservatory, from which he graduated in 1996. In 1993, he was appointed Associate Clarinetist of the Tatarstan Opera and Ballet Theatre and the Tatarstan State Symphony Orchestra.

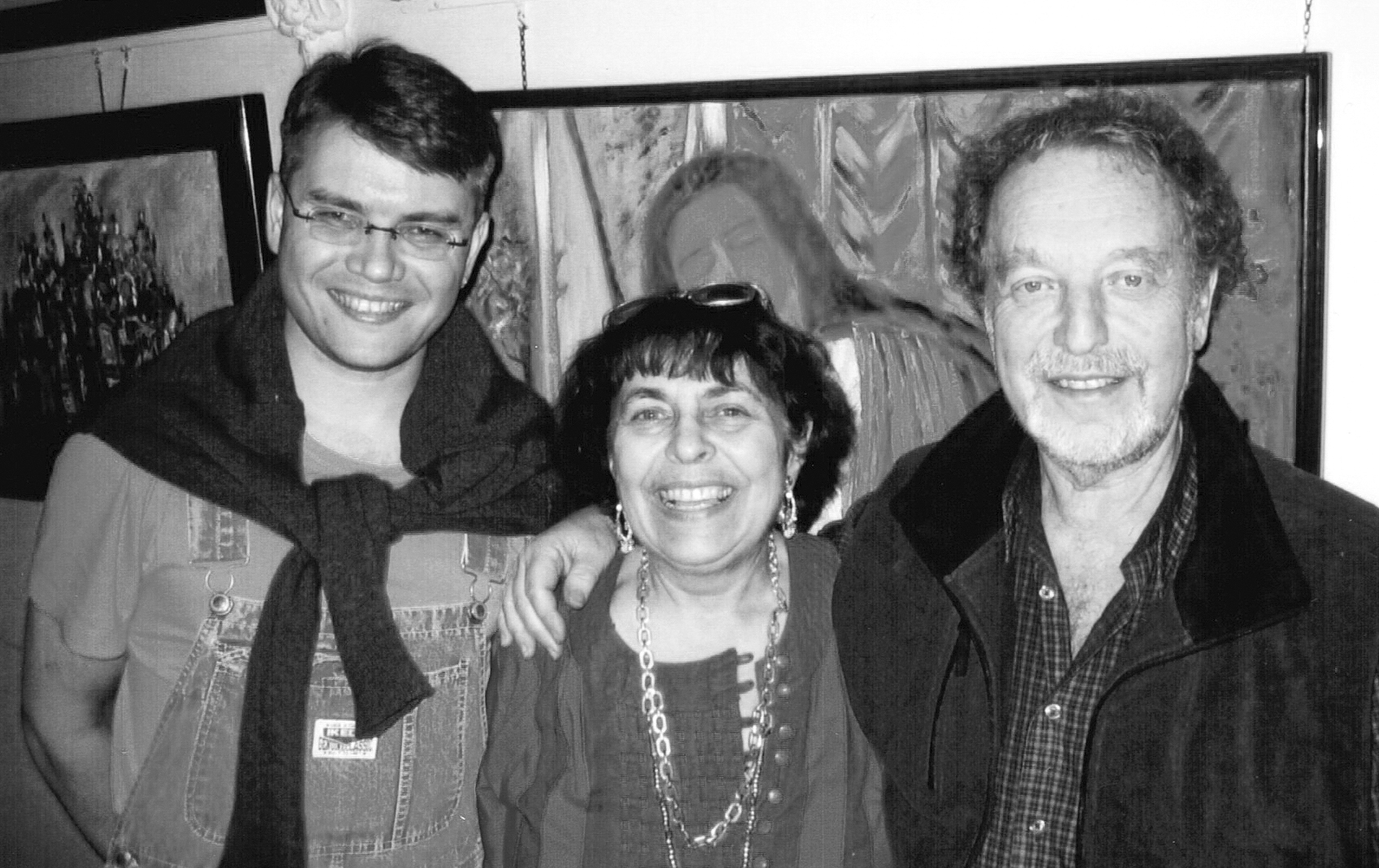
Composer Airat Ichmouratov with Canadian cellist and conductor Yuli Turovsky and his wife, violinist Eleonora Turovsky, summer 2001

In 1997, Ichmouratov traveled to Canada to participate as a student at Orford Art's Centre Festival, where he met the Soviet-born Canadian cellist, conductor and music educator Yuli Turovsky. Ichmouratov regarded Turovsky as a mentor and collaborated with him on several occasions. In 2004 Turovsky invited Ichmouratov's klezmer band, Kleztory, to record CD with I Musici de Montreal chamber orchestra (Chandos Records). Ichmouratov's "Fantastic Dances" for clarinet, cello and piano with Strings and percussion were commissioned and recorded by Yuli Turovsky & I Musici de Montreal. The work was premiered in Pollack Hall on 20 December 2007.

== Career ==
In 1998, Ichmouratov permanently moved to Montreal, Quebec, Canada, where he obtained a master's degree from the University of Montreal, studying with Andre Moisan. He then founded the Muczynski Trio with cellist Luo Di and pianist Evgenia Kirjner. The ensemble won 1st prize and the Grand Award at the National Music Festival (Canada, 2002), as well as first prize at the 8th International Chamber Music Competition in Kraków, Poland (2004).

Upon his arrival in Canada, Ichmouratov performed on the streets and in metro stations for approximately four years in order to support himself. In an interview with Evening-Kazan, he noted that this period allowed him to develop a range of skills from other street musicians, including improvisation, jazz, klezmer, and folk music. He mentioned that working on wide range of repertoire both increased his confidence and contributed to his growth as a conductor. In another interview with Christophe Huss of Le Devoir, Ichmouratov stated that he became a composer largely by chance.

In 2000, he began studying conducting at the University of Montreal. During this time, he took an orchestration class with Alan Belkin, with whom Ichmouratov later studied composition. The class assignment required students to compose and orchestrate a melody in three different ways, an exercise that captivated Ichmouratov. He began with eight bars but soon found he could not stop, ultimately completing his first opus, a 45-minute String Quartet. Having started his career as a street musician, Ichmouratov is now an orchestral conductor, klezmer clarinetist, and classical composer, with a substantial body of compositions.

=== Conductor ===
After earning his doctorate in orchestral conducting from the University of Montreal in 2005, Ichmouratov took his first conducting position with the chamber orchestra Les Violons du Roy in Quebec City, serving as assistant conductor to Bernard Labadie, a specialist in Baroque and Classical repertoire. Les Violons du Roy’s concert Russian Impressions on 5 December 2008, conducted by Ichmouratov and featuring the world premiere of his Cello Concerto, won the Opus Prize for Best Concert of the Year. Ichmouratov was appointed resident conductor of the Quebec Symphony Orchestra from 2009 until 2011, where he assisted Israeli conductor and composer Yoav Talmi.

In 2011, Ichmouratov replaced Yuli Turovsky on short notice to conduct the I Musici de Montréal Chamber Orchestra on tour in USA, Brazil, and Peru. During 2018–2021 Ichmouratov served as composer and conductor in residence with Longueuil Symphony Orchestra. He has appeared as a guest conductor with several orchestras worldwide, including Izmir State Symphony Orchestra (Turkey), Free State Symphony Orchestra (South Africa), Tatarstan National Symphony Orchestra (Russia), National Arts Centre Orchestra, Orchestre Métropolitain, and Les Grand Ballets Canadiens (Canada). In May 2022, Ichmouratov conducted London Symphony Orchestra during the recording of his own Piano and Viola Concertos for Chandos Records.

=== Kleztory ===
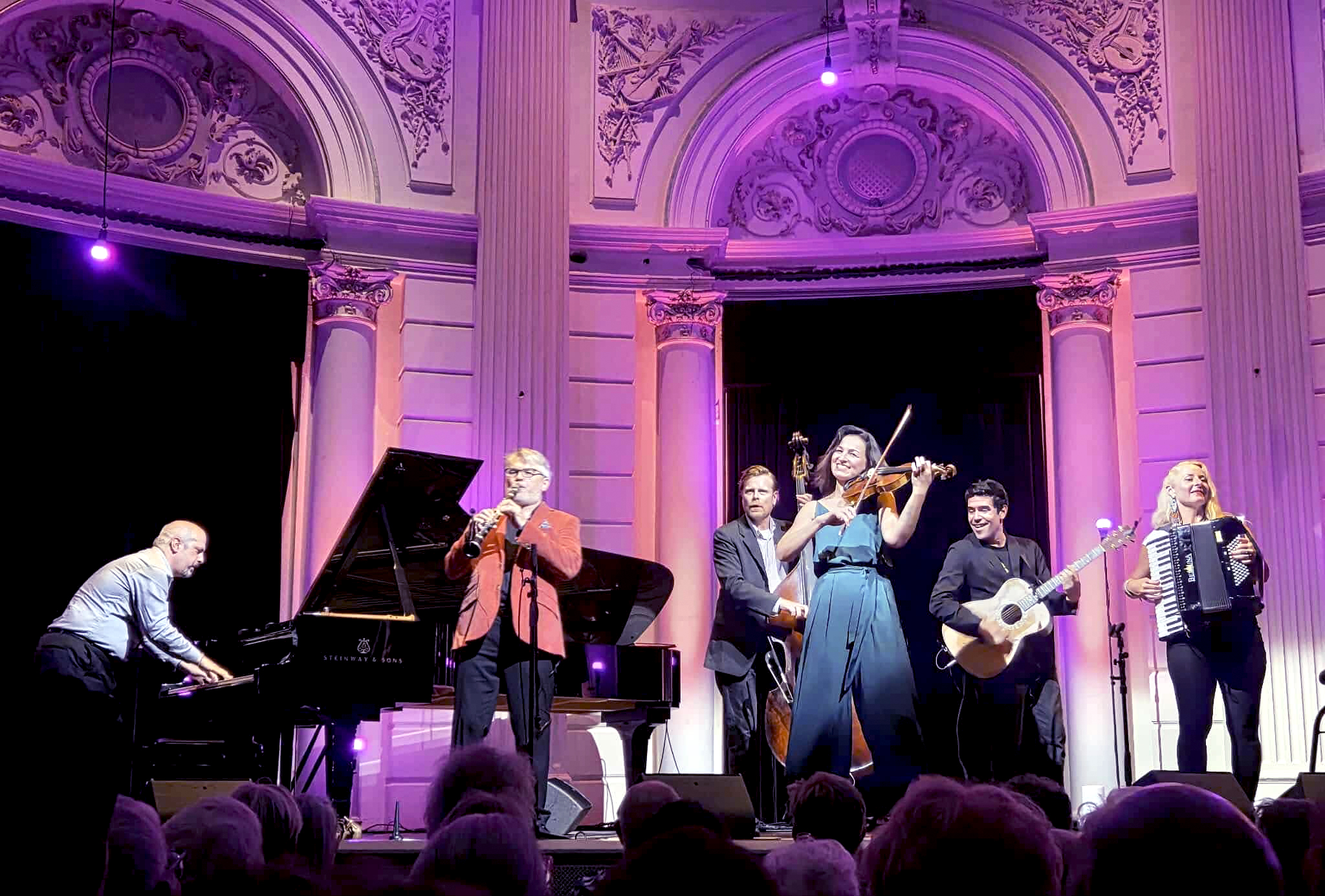
The klezmer ensemble Kleztory during their performance at the Concertgebouw in Amsterdam, July 2025.

Ichmouratov joined the klezmer group Kleztory in 2000. In 2004, Kleztory recorded a CD for Chandos Records (Great Britain) with I Musici de Montréal Chamber Orchestra and Yuli Turovsky. In 2007 Kleztory's album Nomade won the Opus prize. Their 2014 album Arrival was nominated as best album of the year in the Traditional music category by ADISQ. Kleztory won the Opus Prize in 2018 for Best World Music Concert of the Year in Québec for Mundial Tour and again in 2022 in the category Best World Music Album of the Year in Québec for Momentum.

With Kleztory, Ichmouratov has performed as soloist with several orchestras including the Montreal Symphony Orchestra, the Quebec Symphony Orchestra, I Musici de Montréal Chamber Orchestra, Les Violons du Roy, and Brussels Chamber Orchestra. The group has toured extensively in Canada, the United States, the Netherlands, France, Germany, Austria, Belgium, Romania, Brazil, Mexico, Norway, Switzerland, Hungary, Costa Rica, and China. Kleztory made an appearance at the Concertgebouw in Amsterdam, performing in the Kleine Zaal (Recital Hall) on 24 July 2025

== Composer ==
Ichmouratov is known for a compositional style that blends Russian Romanticism, Tatar heritage, French Canadian folk, and the Jewish klezmer tradition. His works show influences from Russian composers such as Shostakovich and Prokofiev, while frequently incorporating a diverse range of instruments to create a fusion of classical, folk, and world music elements. Among his compositions are an opera, a symphony, eight overtures, tone poems, twelve concerti, concerti grossi, works for chamber ensembles, solo instruments, klezmer band and music for children. In 2017, Ichmouratov earned a master's degree in music from the University of Montreal, specializing in composition.

=== Musical style ===
The music of Ichmouratov is generally categorized as neo-romantic. Frédéric Cardin, reviewing the Chandos recording of his Piano and Viola concertos with London Symphony orchestra called him as "a leader in contemporary neo-romantic music worldwide". In an interview with la Scena Musicale, which referred to him as a "21st Century Romanticist", Ichmouratov stated that his preferred repertoire includes works by Russian composers such as Tchaikovsky, Rachmaninoff, Shostakovich, Prokofiev, Mussorgsky, and Borodin. Ichmouratov, having grown up in Russia, expressed his connection to this musical heritage. He has also expressed admiration for German composers such as Mahler, Strauss, and Wagner, whose works he finds particularly inspiring.

Several reviewers have described Ichmouratov's music as tonal, well orchestrated, often drawing comparisons to composers such as Khachaturian, Kalinnikov, Rachmaninoff, and Prokofiev. Katherine Cooper of PrestoMusic noted that, listening to Ichmouratov’s works without prior knowledge, she would have assumed that most of his orchestral music originated from the first half of the twentieth century. According to Yannick Nézet-Séguin, who performed composer's music on several occasions, Ichmouratov excels as a communicator. Nézet-Séguin stated that Ichmouratov’s works immediately engage the listener, taking them on a journey through storytelling, landscapes, and emotions.

There have been differing opinions regarding Ichmouratov’s musical language. Michael Wilkinson of Music Web International in his review described Ichmouratov's Symphony as dull, noting difficulty in identifying a distinctive voice within the work. David Nice of BBC Classical Music wrote that Ichmouratov's Youth Overture has "a creepy-weird counter-theme and a broad synthetic melody". In contrast, Ateş Orga of Classical Source praised Ichmouratov for his craftsmanship, orchestration, and rich tonal and modal melodies. Michael Church of BBC Classical Music described the second movement of Ichmouratov's Viola Concerto No.1 as "gorgeous and very expressive". According to Britannica, the Romantic era in music emphasized individuality, personal emotional expression, and freedom in form. We can see all these elements in Ichmouratov's music, today in 21st century. Composer in an interview with La Presse speaks about his own music:

...My music is the best way to express what I feel in my heart. It is an emotion that I transform into a language understood all over the world.

=== Orchestration ===
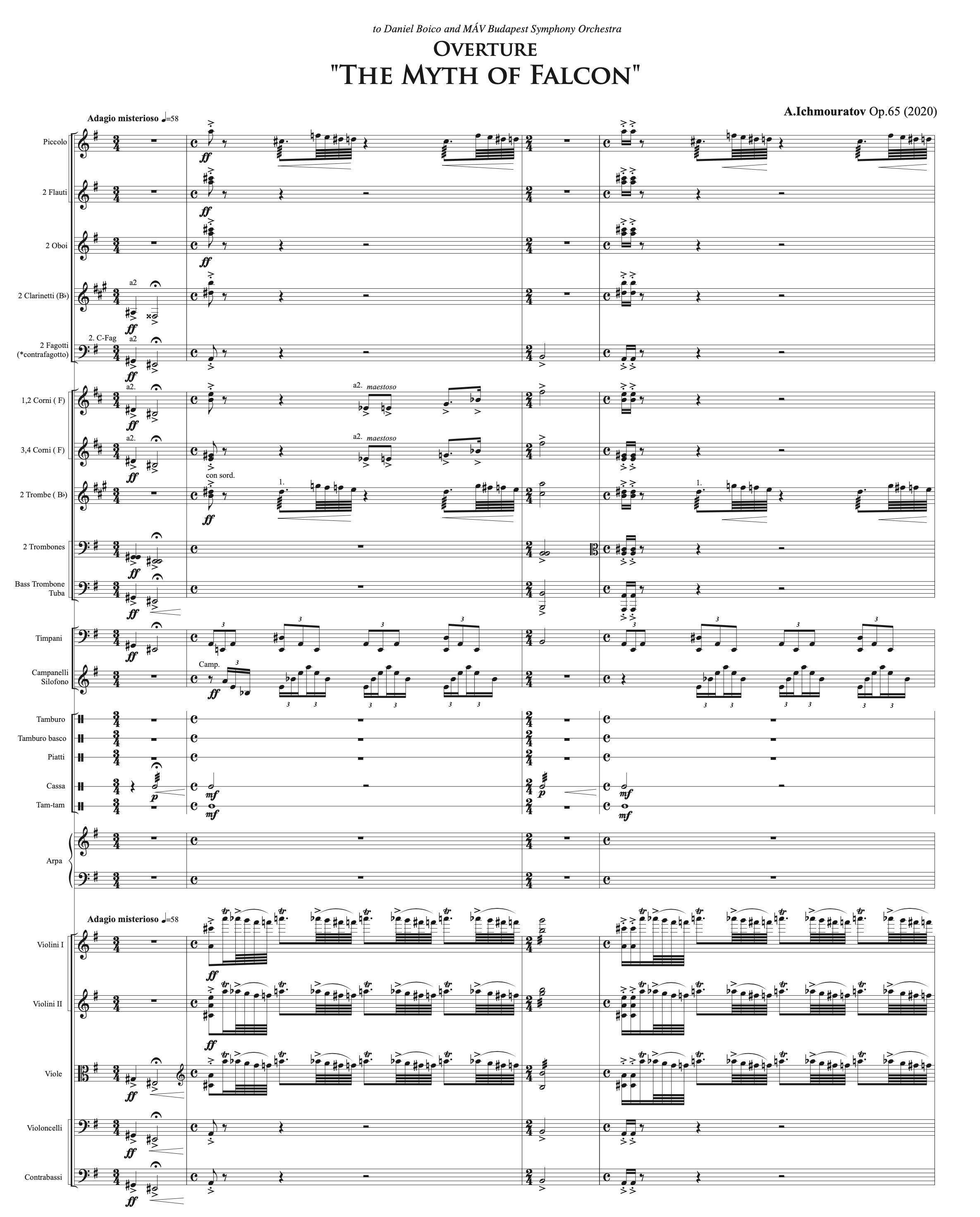
Ichmouratov, Overture The Myth of Falcon, mm 1–4, The first page of conductor's score demonstrates full-size orchestration

According to various accounts, Ichmouratov is acknowledged as a skilled orchestrator. The majority of his orchestral compositions, including opera, symphony, overtures, and concertos, are scored for the full-size orchestra, often reflecting the style of the late 19th through the mid-20th century. These works typically involve 80 to 100 performers and a wide variety of instruments. In his Master's thesis at the University of Montreal, where he talks about his "Youth" Overture, the composer expressed admiration for the orchestrational techniques of Tchaikovsky, Shostakovich, and Rachmaninov:

... The orchestration of my overture is influenced by the great Russian composers: Pyotr Tchaikovsky, Sergei Rachmaninov, and Dmitri Shostakovich. I have always been fascinated by the orchestration skills of these composers. I noticed and used the idea of Tchaikovsky, who often uses in culminations brass harmonic pedals with little rests between them. It gives more clarity to the melody and harmonic change. I like a lot when Rachmaninov uses the entire string section to play the melody in unison accompanied by winds and brass, so I decided to use a similar orchestration for the appearance of the second theme. Shostakovich's opening fanfare in his Festive Overture was a source of inspiration for orchestration for the opening and middle fanfares of my overture.

=== 'Fate' motif: a rising seventh (A – C – G♯) ===
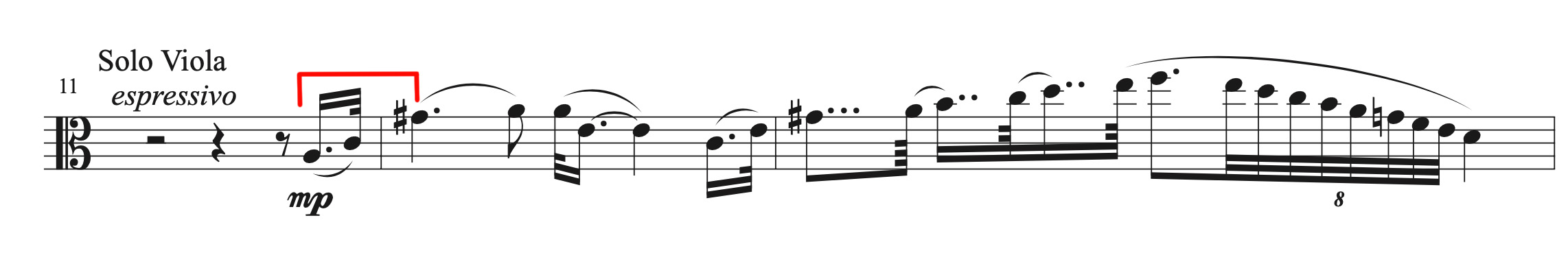
Ichmouratov, Three Viola Romances, Op. 22, 3rd movement, bars 11–13. Example of 'Fate' motif

In his interview with Keith Horner, while working on his first Chandos recording of the tone poem "Letter from an Unknown Woman," the composer mentions about the 'Fate' motif characterized by a rising seventh (A – C – G♯). This motif is a recurring musical figure that carries profound thematic significance in his compositions. The motif originated from the leap of a seventh in the English horn solo of the last movement of Shostakovich's Fourth Symphony. Ichmouratov adapted the motif by introducing a minor third in place of a perfect fourth within the major seventh. The motif appears in numerous works, including Three Viola Romances Op.22 (2009), String Quartet No. 4 Op.35 (2013), Cello Concerto No. 2 Op.57 (2018), Concerto Grosso N2 Op.60 (2018), tone poems for Strings like “Letter from an Unknown Woman” Op.56 (2017) and “The Ninth Wave” Op.61 (2019), Concerto for Violin and Cello Op.66 (2020), Flute Concerto Op.64 (2020), and the Opera “The Man Who Laughs" Op.75 (2023). This motif, frequently connected with destiny and perseverance, appears throughout Ichmouratov’s music, both in tender and in strong, dissonant moments.

=== Tribute to Quebec ===
External audio
- Quebec folk-inspired fragment from Overture "Cosmopolitan city" Op.29 Perfumed by L'Orchestre Métropolitain under Ichmouraov's baton. Maison symphonique de Montréal, 26 January 2012
- Allegro festivo

On 21 October 2020, Ichmouratov received Charles Biddle Prize. The Charles-Biddle Prize recognizes the outstanding contributions of immigrants to Quebec whose personal or professional commitment contributes to the cultural and artistic development of Quebec.

Several of Ichmouratov's compositions draw inspiration from the history and folk traditions of the province of Quebec, where the composer has been residing since 1998. The Overture "Cosmopolitan City" op.29 was commissioned by Yannick Nézet-Séguin and premiered under composer's baton with l’Orchestre Métropolitain on 12 January 2012 in Montreal. Overture celebrates the cosmopolitan character of Montreal, incorporating Quebec folk elements alongside Armenian, Russian, Jewish, and a traditional Tatar melodies, reflecting the composer’s cultural heritage. In 2020, a Quebec folk-inspired segment of the Overture was featured during the opening ceremony of "The National Day of Quebec" performed by Yannick Nézet-Séguin and L'Orchestre Métropolitain. Additionally, in August 2022, the same orchestra presented the Overture at the base of Mont Royal in Montreal, captivating an audience of 50,000 spectators.

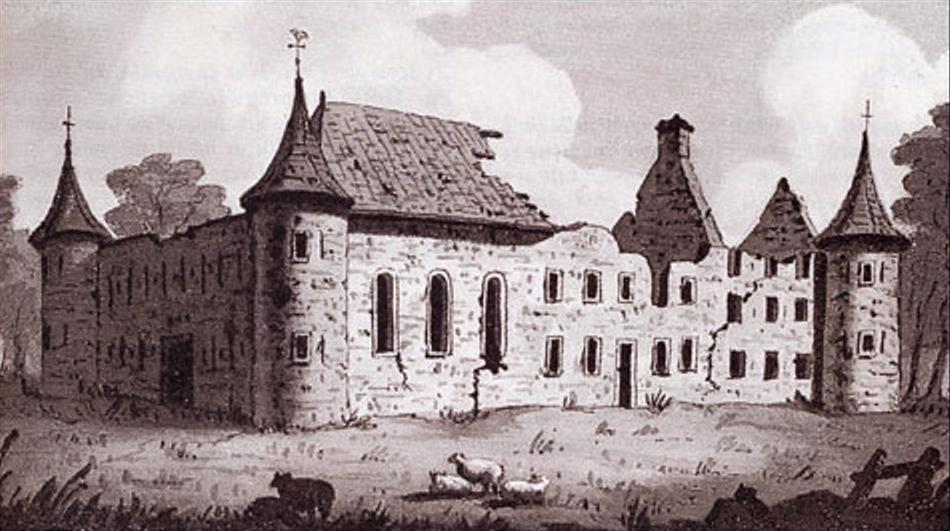
Ruins of Fort Longueuil, that inspired Ichmouratov's Symphony in A minor "On the Ruins of an Ancient Fort," painting by John Poad Drake

Ichmouratov's Symphony in A minor "On the Ruins of an Ancient Fort" Op.55, is another example of composer's dedication to culture and history of Quebec. Inspired by Longueuil city's history and Charles le Moyne de Longueuil's character, was commissioned and performed by French-Canadian conductor Marc David and Longueuil Symphony Orchestra. In his Symphony, the composer aimed to revive the vibrancy of Longueuil, a city situated on the south shore of the St. Lawrence River, tracing its history from its origins as an outpost of New France (with only the foundations of Fort Longueuil remaining) to the present day. Symphony in A minor was recorded by Jean-Philippe Tremblay and L'Orchestre de la Francophonie and released by Chandos in August 2019.

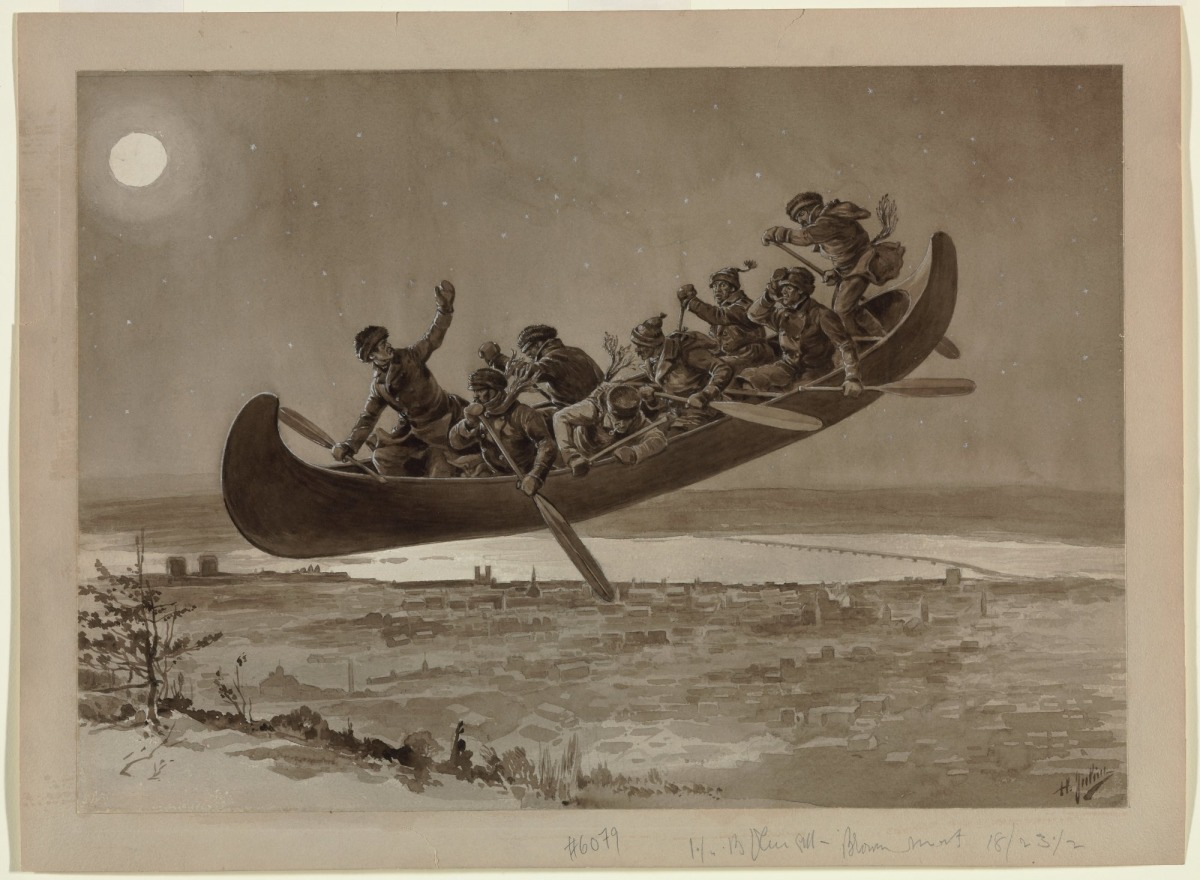
La Chasse-galerie by Henri Julien, 1906, Musée national des beaux-arts du Québec, The Folk story that inspired Ichmouratov Overture "La Chasse-Galerie" Op.70

In 2021, Ichmouratov composed Overture "The Bewitched Canoe" op.70, inspired by folk story "La Chasse-galerie", which is a well-known French-Canadian tale about lumberjacks working in camps along the Gatineau River. In this story, the lumberjacks strike a deal with the devil, portraying a variant of the Wild Hunt. The most famous version of the story was written by Honoré Beaugrand (1848–1906). The tale made its appearance in a book of French-Canadian folktales titled "Legends of French Canada" by Edward C. Woodley. The book was originally published in 1931 and later republished in 1938.

Overture was premiered by Longueuil Symphony Orchestra in December 2021 and in August 2023 it was conducted by Alain Trudel and the National Academy Orchestra of Canada.

Example of inspiration from French Canadian traditional folk theme Alouette in Ichmouratov's Overture "The Bewitched Canoe" Op.70

mm. 7–8

=== Klezmer influences ===
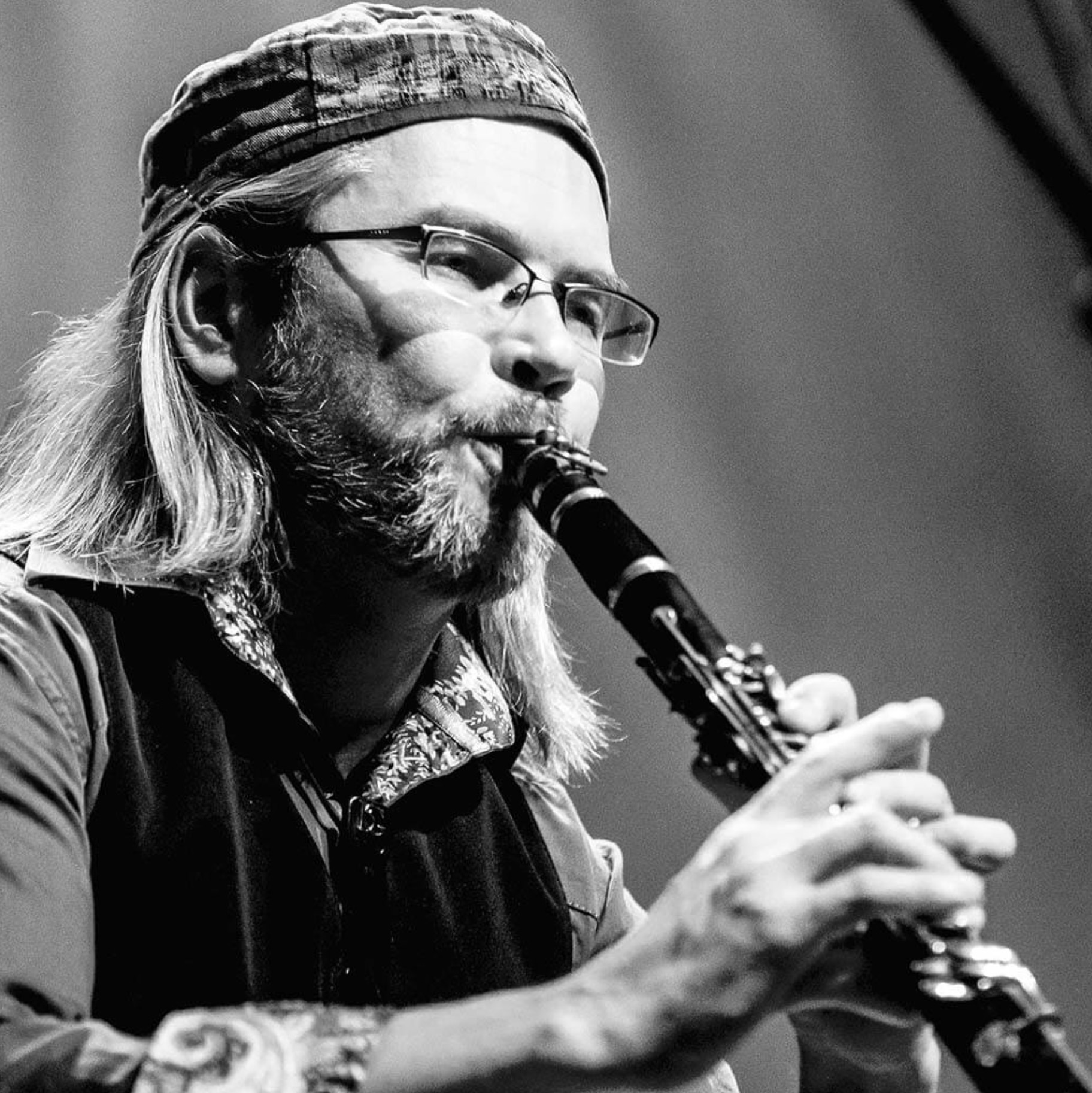
Ichmouratov, clarinetist and composer of the klezmer band Kleztory, April 2017

Klezmer is an instrumental musical tradition originating from the Ashkenazi Jews of Central and Eastern Europe. The core components of this tradition encompass dance tunes, ritual melodies, and virtuosic improvisations designed for listening. Typically, these elements would be performed at events such as weddings and other social gatherings. Having an extensive experience in klezmer music after serving as a clarinetist, composer, arranger for over 26 years in the klezmer band Kleztory, Ichmouratov has composed and recorded numerous works with Kleztory in the traditional klezmer style. Also, he often incorporated klezmer folk elements into his classical compositions.

The first time we can observe the klezmer influence in Ichmouratov's classical composition dates back to 2006, when Central Band of the Canadian Armed Forces commissioned, premiered and recorded "Fantasia on klezmer themes" Op.13 for clarinet and concert band. Then in 2007, we can see klezmer inspired theme in the second movement of the "Fantastic Dances" for Clarinet, Cello and Piano with Strings and Percussion Op.15.

Klezmer-inspired theme in the second movement of Ichmouratov's "Fantastic Dances" Op.15, Piano part

mm. 177–184

Commissioned and recorded by Yuli Turovsky & I Musici de Montréal chamber orchestra, the world premiere of The Fantastic Dances took place at Pollack Hall on 20 December 2007. These three dances drew inspiration from Natasha Turovsky's eponymous surrealistic paintings. Then, in 2011, we can clearly observe klezmer inspired themes in his Concerto grosso N1 Op.28 for Clarinet, Violin, Viola, Cello, Piano and String Orchestra with Percussion. Composition is dedicated to Yuli Turovsky, with whom collaborated on several occasions. In 2004 Turovsky invited Ichmouratov's klezmer band Kleztory to record CD with I Musici de Montreal chamber orchestra (Chandos Records), which became a milestone in career of the band.

In the latter section of the first movement, a melismatic clarinet Doina appears as a distinctive element. Its opening phrase becomes the main musical idea, developed throughout the work. The doina's origins can be traced back to Romanian folk music traditions, but now also part of the klezmer tradition.

A.Ichmouratov Concerto grosso N1 II mv. Clarinet part, example of klezmer influence in Ichmouratov's music, clarinet Doina

mm. 318–321

One of the most notable indications of klezmer influence can be found in Ichmouratov's composition “One day of an almost ordinary life” for Clarinet and String Quartet or String Orchestra Op.47 composed in 2015. It was commissioned, premiered and recorded by French-Canadian clarinetist Andre Moisan and Montreal-based Molinari String Quartet. Composition written in tradition of classical concerto works, showcasing a solo clarinet, which can optionally be paired with a bass clarinet, in three movements that linked to each other. It incorporates elements of traditional klezmer music, including the doina and freylech, the most common type of klezmer dance tune, which is characterized by a 2/4 time signature and is designed for group circle dances. For the principal theme of the second movement Ichmouratov used a traditional klezmer tune - Di Sapozhkelekh.

=== Influences from world cultures ===
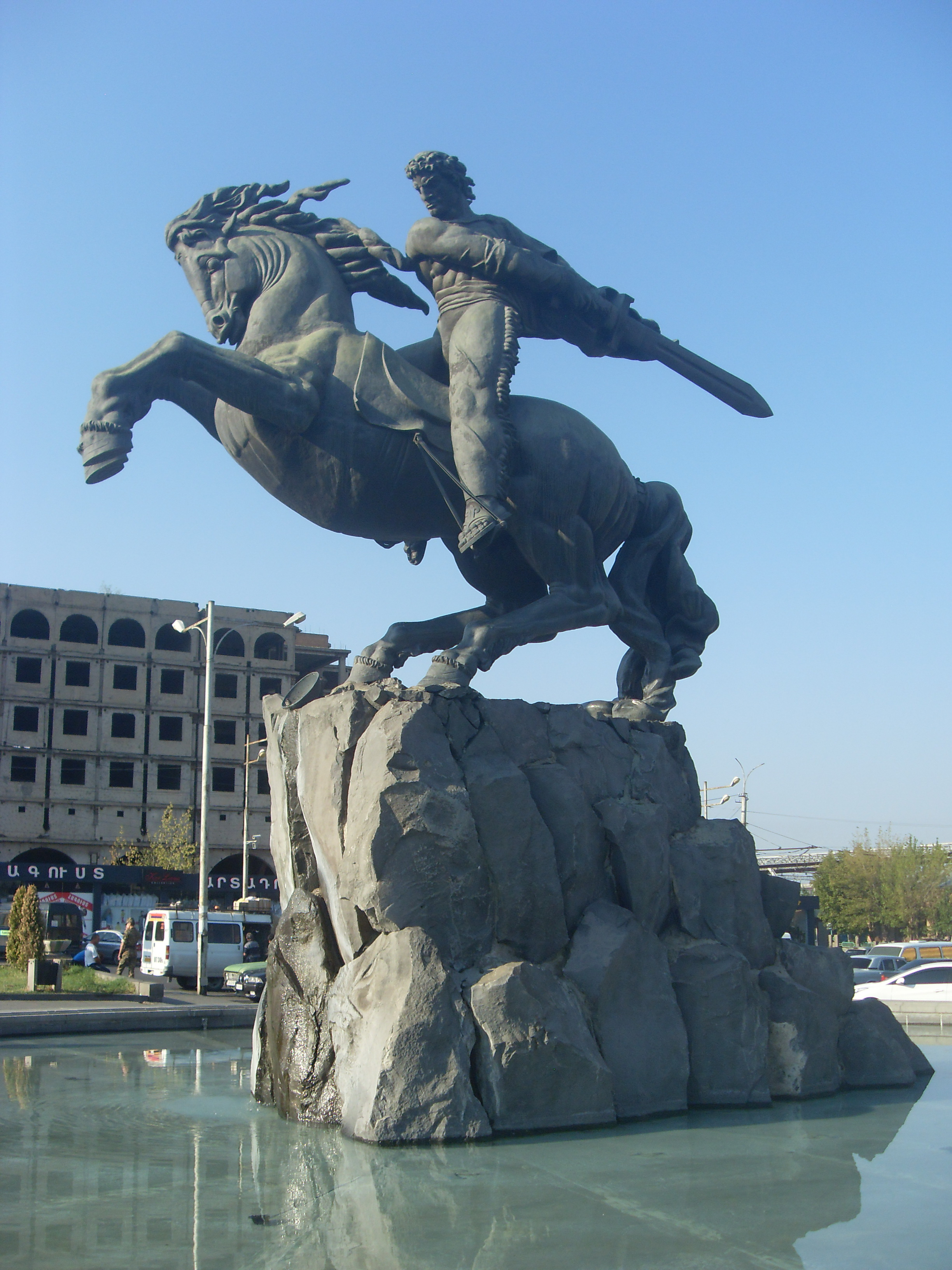
Monument to David of Sassoun in Erevan, who is the main hero of Armenia's national epic Daredevils of Sassoun, which inspired Ichmouratov's eponymous Symphonic Fantasy

In addition to drawing inspiration from klezmer traditional music and Quebec folk themes, Ichmouratov frequently explores the folklore of various other world cultures, including Hungarian – Overture The Myth of Falcon Op.65 (2020), Armenian – "David of Sassoon" – Symphonic Fantasy after Armenian epos Op.11 (2006), Russian – Overture Peter the Great Op.62 (2019), Overture Koliada Op.67 (2020), Overture Maslenitsa Op.36 (2013), music tale Shabarsha for Tap Dancer and String Orchestra Op.39 (2013), 3 poems after Alexandre Pushkin Op.34 for soprano and Chamber Orchestra (2012), Japanese – Trio for Harp, Viola and Flute "Fujin's Dream" Op.58 (2018), Croatian and Serbian – Trio for Clarinet, Violin and Accordion "Tales from the Dinarides" Op.48 (2016).

Example of inspiration from Hungarian traditional folk theme "Marosszéki kerek erdő" in Ichmouratov's Overture The Myth of Falcon Op.65

mm. 31–34

=== Critical reception ===
The overall reception of his body of work has been generally positive. However, some of Ichmouratov’s works have been described quite differently by critics, with some praising them as expressive and beautiful, while others have pointed to passages they found as boring and somewhat lacking in originality. Overall, the responses have varied widely. David Nice from BBC Music Magazine wrote: "I had to force myself to listen to the end of the A minor Symphony, more a symphonic tone-poem in four very conventional movements". Guy Rickards from Gramophone wrote: "the symphony is colourful and descriptive... Attractive if not great music" Michael Church of BBC Music Magazine wrote about Ichmouratov's Viola Concerto N1: "its slow movement is gorgeous". Gregor Tassie of MusicWeb International wrote: "entry by the viola in a bewitchingly beautiful theme". Frédéric Cardin of Panm360 wrote: "...rich in cushioned harmonies and orchestral moiré".

Ichmouratov's music has been performed by Maxim Vengerov, Yannick Nézet-Séguin, Jonathan Crow, Alexis Hauser, Alexander Gilman and LGT Young Soloists, Robert Langevin, Alain Trudel, Max Pollak, Stéphane Tétreault, Evgeny Bushkov & Moscow Virtuosi Chamber orchestra, London Symphony Orchestra, Quebec Symphony Orchestra, Orchestre Métropolitain, Taipei Symphony Orchestra, Agnieszka Duczmal & Amadeus Chamber Orchestra of Polish Radio, Les Violons du Roy, Orchestra London, New Orford String Quartet, Yuli Turovsky & I Musici de Montreal, Alcan Quartet, Molinari Quartet, Sinfonia Toronto, in concert halls such as Vienna Musikverein, Konzerthaus Berlin, ElbPhilarmonie, Tonhalle Zürich, Sydney Opera House, Montreal Symphony House, and others.

Ichmouratov was named as Resident Composer 2012 at Concerts aux îles du Bic (Canada), in 2013 Composer of Summer at Orford Arts Centre (Canada) and in 2015 Summer Composer at 17e édition of Festival Classique des Hautes-Laurentides (Canada). Since 2010 Ichmouratov is Associate Composer with Canadian Music Centre.

== Discography ==
- Klezmer music, Kleztory (2002)
- Barber, Copland, Britten, Bruch, Kazan Chamber Orchestra La Primavera – Ak Bars (2002)
- Klezmer, Kleztory, Yuli Turovsky & I Musici de Montreal Chamber Orchestra – Chandos Records (2004)
- Nomade, Kleztory, Opus Award winner 2007 – Amerix (2007)
- Shostakovich, Weinberg, Ichmouratov, I Musici de Montreal Chamber Orchestra – Analekta (2008)
- Symphonique, Le Vent du Nord et Quebec Symphony Orchestra – CBC (2010)
- Carte Postale, Alcan Quartet – ATMA Classique (2011)
- Beethoven, Violin Concerto (cadenzas by Ichmouratov), Symphony No. 7, Alexandre Da Costa, Taipei Symphony Orchestra – Warner Classics (2013)
- Arrival, Kleztory – Amerix (2014)
- Tales from the Dinarides, Michael Bridge, Guillaume Tardif, Kornel Wolak – Wirth Institute (2017)
- Klezmer Dreams, Andre Moisan, Jean Saulnier and Molinari Quartet – ATMA Classique (2017)
- Nigun, Kleztory – Amerix (2017)
- Melodies of Nations, Romic – Moynihan Duo – Hedone Records (2017)
- Letter From an Unknown Woman, Three Romances for Viola, Concerto Grosso No. 1 – Belarusian State Chamber Orchestra, Evgeny Bushkov – Chandos (2019)
- Youth' Overture, Maslenitsa Overture, Symphony, Op.55 'On the Ruins of an Ancient Fort' – Orchestre de la Francophonie, Jean-Philippe Tremblay – Chandos (2020)
- Momentum, Kleztory – Chandos (2020)
- Julia MacLaine, Preludes – Analekta (2022)
- Ichmouratov: Viola Concerto No.1 / Piano Concerto – London Symphony Orchestra, Airat Ichmouratov conductor – Chandos (2023)
- Meeting Point, Kleztory – Amerix (2023)
- Destins Tragiques, I Musici de Montreal, Elvira Misbakhova viola – ATMA Classique (2023)
- Ichmouratov; Schubert - Works for Strings, LGT Young Soloists, Alexander Gilman, violin – Naxos Records (2024)
- Ichmouratov: The Ninth Wave, Viola Concerto No. 2, Cello Concerto No. 1, Les Violons du Roy, Elvira Misbakhova viola, Stephane Tetreault cello – ATMA Classique (2025)
- Fujin’s Dream - Works for Flute, Viola and Harp Trio Lawrence – Post Haus Acoustic (2025)
- Duo Étrange: I Wish I Were Dead – ATMA Classique (2026)
- Rendezvous, Kleztory – Amerix (2026)

== List of compositions ==
=== Opera ===
- The Man Who Laughs after Victor Hugo's novel "L'Homme qui rit", Op.75 (2023)

=== Orchestra ===
- David of Sassoon – Symphonic Fantasy after Armenian epos, Op. 11 (2006)
- Overture Halloweenesque, Op. 21 (2009)
- Overture Ville Cosmopolite, Op. 29 (2012)
- Overture Maslenitsa, Op. 36 (2013)
- Overture Youth, Op. 50 (2016)
- Symphony in A minor, Op. 55 "On the Ruins of an Ancient Fort" (2017)
- Overture Peter the Great, Op. 62 (2019)
- Overture The Myth of Falcon, Op. 65 (2020)
- Overture Koliada, Op. 67 (2020)
- Overture The Bewitched Canoe, Op. 70 (2021)

=== Concerti with orchestra ===
- Concerto for Viola No. 1 with Symphony Orchestra, Op. 7 (2004)
- Concerto for Viola No. 2 with String Orchestra and harpsichord (in Baroque style), Op. 41 (2015)
- Concerto for Oboe and Strings with Percussion, Op. 6 (2004)
- Concerto for Flute and Symphony Orchestra, Op. 64 (2020)
- Concerto for Bassoon and Symphony Orchestra, Op. 79 (2025)
- Concerto for Cello No. 1 with String Orchestra and percussion, Op. 18 (2009)
- Concerto for Cello No. 2 with Symphony Orchestra, Op. 57 (2018)
- Concerto for Piano and Orchestra, Op. 40 (2014)
- Concerto for Bayan with Symphony Orchestra, Op. 83 (2026)
- Double Concerto No. 1 for Violin and Cello with Strings, Piano and Percussion, Op. 66 (2020)
- Double Concerto No. 2 for Violin and Viola with Strings, Op. 77 (2024)
- Double Concerto No. 3 for Clarinet and Cello with Strings, Op. 81 (2025)
- Concerto Grosso No. 1 for Clarinet, Violin, Viola, Cello, Piano and String Orchestra with Percussion, Op.28 (2011)
- Concerto Grosso No. 2 for Violin, Flute (recorder)and Harp with String Orchestra, Op.60 (2018)
- Concerto Grosso No. 3 "Liechtenstein" for 2 Violins, Viola, Cello and String Orchestra, Op. 68 (2021)
- Fantasy for Viola and Orchestra on Shostakovich's opera "Lady Macbeth of the Mtsensk District", Op. 12 (2006)
- Three Romances for Viola, Strings and Harp, Op. 22 (2009)
- Capriccio Rustico for Cello and Orchestra, Op. 26 (2010)
- The Ride of Cello Vello Buffon for Cello with Orchestra, Op. 27 (2010)
- Fantastic Dances for Clarinet, Cello and Piano with Strings and Percussion, Op. 15 (2007)
- The Final Procession for Clarinet, Cello and Piano with Strings and Percussion, Op. 37 (2013)
- The Arrival to the City for Clarinet, Cello and Piano with Strings and Percussion, Op. 38 (2013)
- Shabarsha for Tap Dancer and String Orchestra, Op. 39 (2013)
- Elegy for Violin and String Orchestra, Op. 32 (2012)
- Adagio and Allegro con brio for Violin and String Orchestra, Op. 43 (2015)
- Windcatcher for Clarinet and String Orchestra, Op. 17 (2008)
- Fantasia on klezmer themes No. 1, Op. 13 (2006)
- Sarasatiana for 5 Violins and String Orchestra, Op. 20 (2009)

=== Chamber music ===
- Trio "Tales from the Dinarides" for Violin, Clarinet, and Accordion, Op. 48 (2016)
- Trio for Clarinet, Viola and Piano, Op. 61 (2019)
- Trio for Harp, Viola and Flute "Fujin's Dream", Op. 58(2018)
- Trio "Nocturne" for soprano, cello, and piano, Op. 71 (2023)
- String Quartet No. 1, Op. 1 (2003)
- String Quartet No.2, Op.5 / Chamber Symphony No. 2 for String Orchestra, Op. 5A (2009)
- String Quartet No. 3, Op.25 / Chamber Symphony No. 3 for String Orchestra, Op. 25A (2010)
- String Quartet No. 4, Op. 35 / Chamber Symphony No. 4 for String Orchestra, Op. 35A (2013)
- Woodwind Quintet, Op. 63 (2019)
- 12 Preludes for Woodwind Quintet, Op. 8 (2005)
- Sonata for Clarinet and Piano "The Bells", Op. 9 (2005)
- Two pieces, Viola and Piano. Op. 10 (2005)
- Fantasia on klezmer themes No.2 for Clarinet, Piano and String Quartet, Op. 16 (2008)
- Largo for Sanja for Oboe and Piano, Op. 46
- One day of an almost ordinary life for Clarinet and String Quartet, Op. 47 / Clarinet and String Orchestra, Op. 47A (2015)
- String Octet "Letter from an Unknown Woman", after Stefan Zweig's novella "Letter from an Unknown Woman", Op. 56
- The Ninth Wave, tone-poem for Strings, Op. 61(2019)

=== Vocal ===
- 3 poems after Alexander Pushkin for soprano and Chamber Orchestra, Op. 34 (2012)
- Nocturne for soprano, cello, and piano, Op. 71 (2023)
- Quatrains of Wisdom after Omar Khayyam's Rubáiyát for soprano, cello, duduk/clarinet and piano, Op. 82 (2025)

=== Choir ===
- Lux Aeterna for viola, cello, harp and choir, Op. 76 (2023)

=== Music for children ===
- Variations on Children's Theme for Strings and Harp, Op. 23 (2010)
- The Sorcerer's Hat, music tale based on story by Tove Jansson, Op. 24 (2010)
- Chamber Suite from "The Sorcerer's Hat", Op. 24A (2010)
- "Shuburchunchiki", Op. 19 (2010)
- Music tale "When land became Water", with Puppet Theater and Chamber Orchestra after Neeta Premchand's book (2019)
- Giraffe for String Orchestra, Op. 48 (2016)
- Music tale "Shabarsha" for Tap Dancer and String Orchestra, Op. 39 (2013)
- "Ares the god of War", a piece for youth orchestra, Op. 59 (2019)

=== Violin solo ===
- Klezmer Cadenzas for Beethoven Violin Concerto Op.33 (2012)

=== Cello solo ===
- Praeludium in G major for Cello Solo, Op. 69 (2021)

=== Piano solo ===
- 6 Preludes for Piano, Op. 44 (2015)

=== Klezmer ===
- Jew in Rio for klezmer band, Op. 2 (2000)
- Bolero for klezmer band, Op.3 (2000)
- The song of the Dead Sea for klezmer band, Op. 4 (2006)
- Clarinet Doina For clarinet, klezmer band and with Symphony Orchestra, Op. 30 (2012)
- Gut Yontev For klezmer band and Symphony Orchestra, Op. 31 (2012)
- My Mother’s Nigun for klezmer band, Op. 45 (2015)
- Little Khosidl for klezmer band, Op. 46 (2016)
- Hora in G for klezmer band, Op. 49 (2016)
- Churchill street Hora for klezmer band, Op. 51 (2016)
- Freilakh for klezmer band, Op. 52 (2016)
- Soulmate for klezmer band, Op. 53 (2016)
- Waltz for klezmer band, Op. 54 (2016)
- The Wonderer for klezmer band, Op. 71 (2022)
- Freilakh for klezmer band, Op. 72 (2022)

== Personal life ==
Ichmouratov is married to violist and violinist Elvira Misbakhova, and they have two daughters.
