= Concerto Grosso No. 1 (Ichmouratov) =

2011 composition by Airat Ichmouratov

- by Airat Ichmouratov
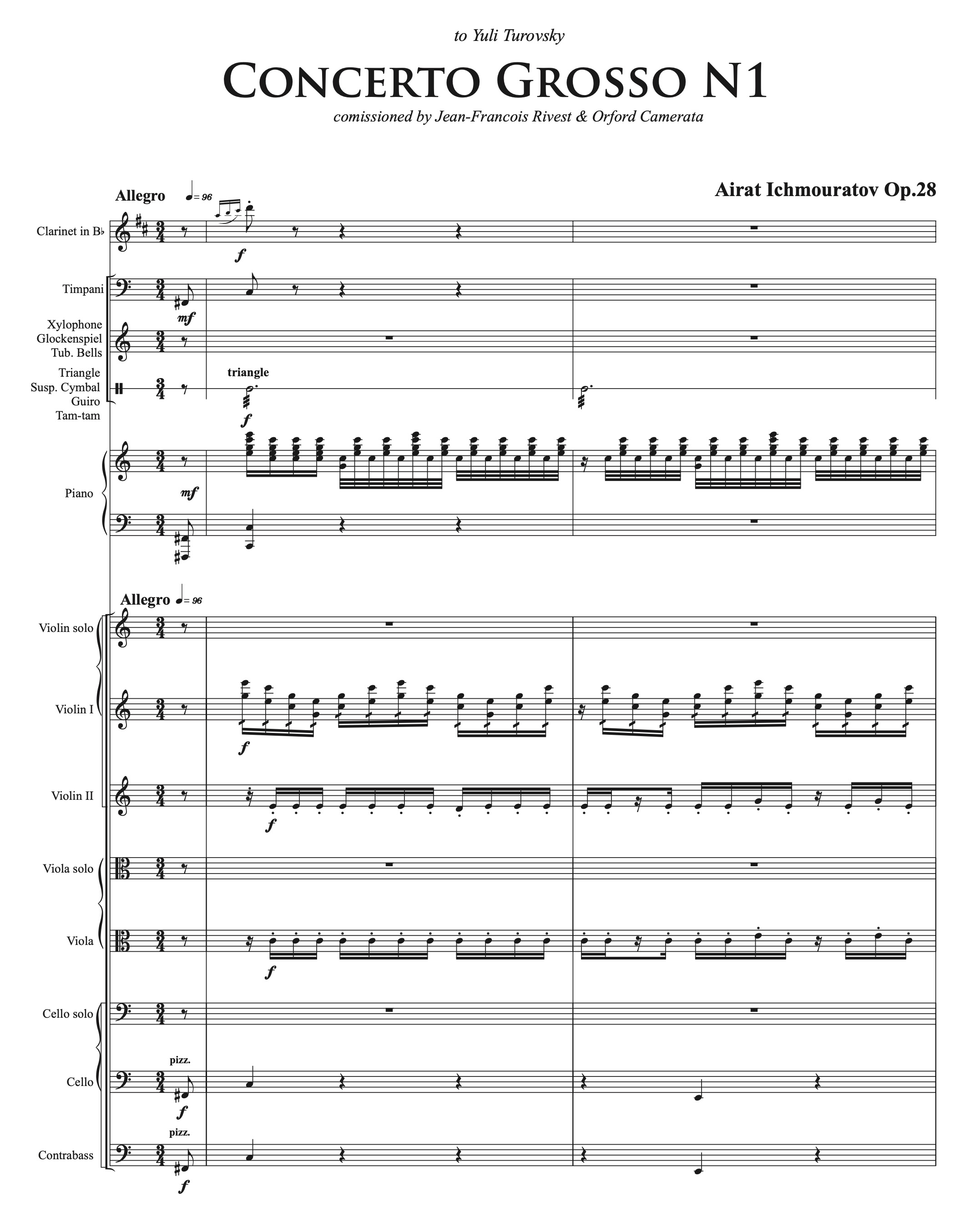
- the first page of the conductor's score of Concerto Grosso N1 Op.28 by Airat Ichmouratov
- Opus: 28
- Composed: 2011
- Dedication: Yuli Turovsky
- Performed: 15 July 2011
- Duration: about 21 minutes
- Movements: three, without pause
- Scoring: solo violin, solo viola, solo cello, solo clarinet, solo piano, Strings with timpani and percussion

Airat Ichmouratov's Concerto Grosso No. 1, Op. 28, was composed in 2011. It was commissioned and premiered on 15 July 2011 by French Canadian conductor Jean-François Rivest and Orford Camerata at Orford Art's Centre, Orford, Canada. Ichmouratov himself was performing solo clarinet part as well on the recording of Concerto Grosso No. 1, that was released on Chandos in 2019.

== Dedication ==
Concerto Grosso No. 1 is dedicated to renowned Soviet-born Canadian cellist, conductor and music educator Yuli Turovsky, whom Ichmouratov considered a mentor and with whom collaborated on multiple occasions. In 2004 Turovsky invited Ichmouratov's klezmer band Kleztory to record CD with I Musici de Montreal chamber orchestra (Chandos Records). Ichmouratov's "Fantastic Dances" for clarinet, cello and piano with Strings and percussion were commissioned and recorded by Yuli Turovsky & I Musici de Montreal. The work was premiered in Pollack Hall on 20 December 2007. In 2011, replacing Yuli Turovsky at short notice, Ichmouratov conducted I Musici de Montréal Chamber Orchestra on tour in USA, Brazil and Peru.

== Analysis ==
The work comprises three movements which performed without pause:

1. Allegro – Poco meno mosso – Tempo I – Poco meno mosso
2. Adagio – Con molta espressione, doloroso – Poco meno mosso
3. Allegro con brio – Poco a poco crescendo – Poco più mosso, frenetico

A typical performance of the work lasts around 21 minutes.

=== Klezmer influence ===
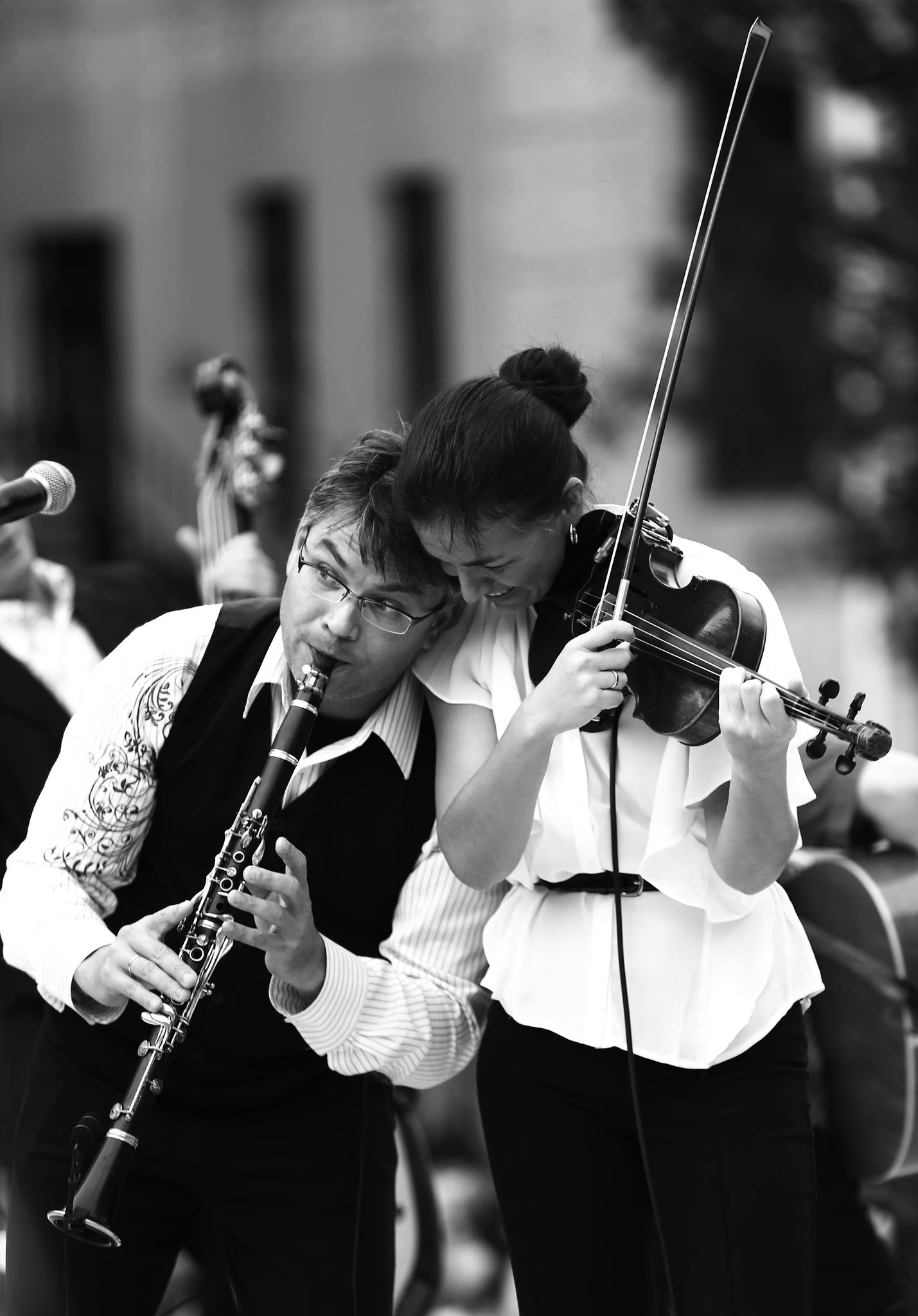
Airat Ichmouratov and Elvira Misbakhova during Kleztory's performance in Shanghai, China, August 2013

Ichmouratov, who has vast experience in klezmer music (after being for more than 20 years a clarinetist of award-winning klezmer band Kleztory) often integrates klezmer folk music in his classical compositions, as well he composed and recorded with Kleztory multiple works for klezmer band in traditional klezmer style.

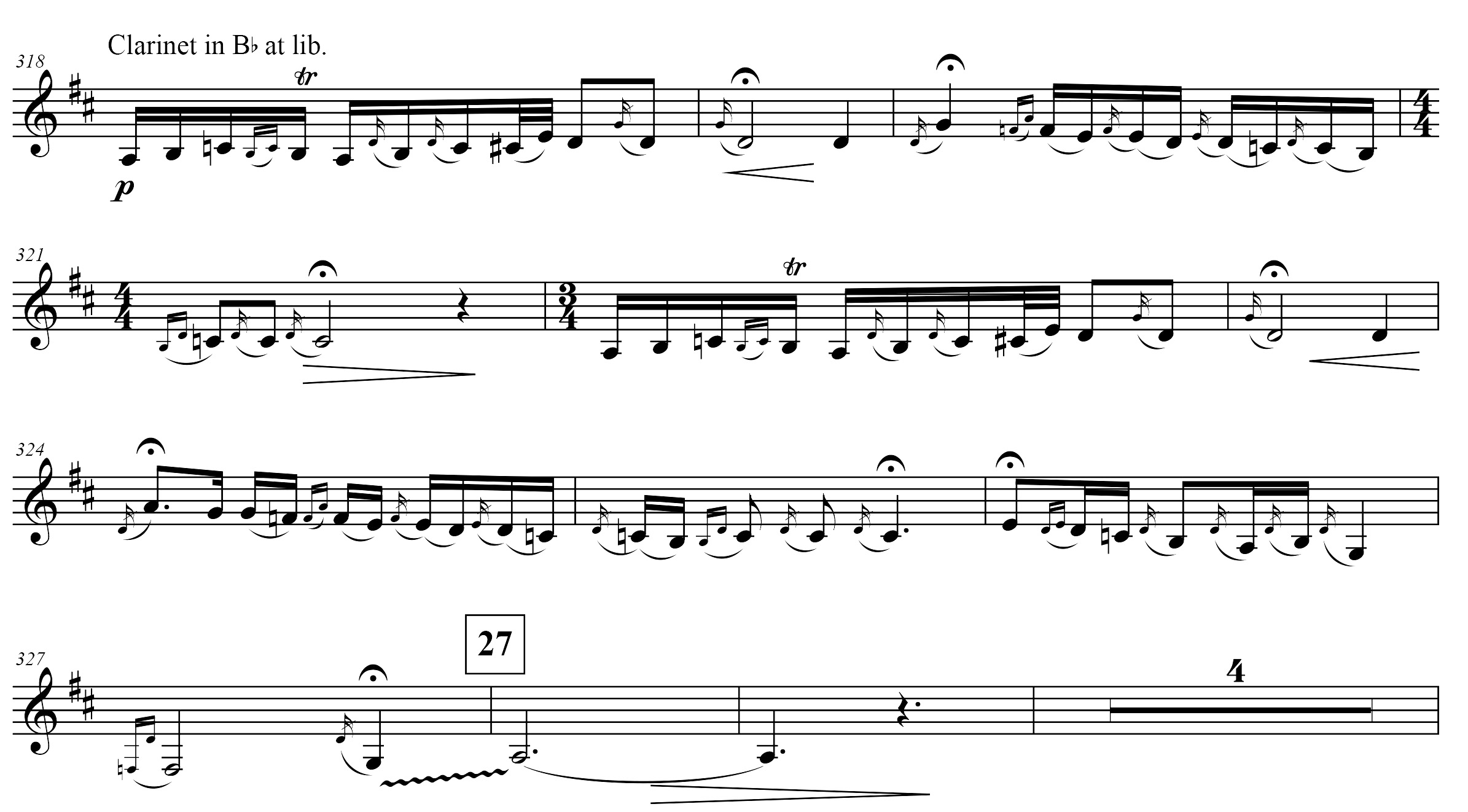
A.Ichmouratov Concerto grosso No. 1 I mv. Clarinet part mm 318–329 example of klezmer influence in Ichmouratov's music, clarinet Doina

Clarinet Doina sample from Concerto Grosso N1 by Ichmouratov
Illustration of the klezmer influence in Ichmouratov's Concerto Grosso No 1 (mm 318–324). This sample demonstrates how Ichmouratov incorporated elements of klezmer music (Doina) into his composition.

We can see the presence of klezmer influences in Concerto Grosso No. 1 as well. In the latter part of the first movement we can hear a melismatic clarinet doina emerges as a notable musical element. Its opening phrase, assumes a pivotal role in the composition, serving as the foundational musical cell from which Ichmouratov crafts the entire concerto. The doina's origins can be traced back to Romanian folk music traditions, but now firmly rooted in the klezmer style of music. In the central Adagio movement, a transformation unfolds as the solo cello takes hold of the ascending motif. This motif, while bearing a Jewish modality, is a composer's creation. It resounds three times through the movement, each iteration deepening the emotional resonance. The clarinet then takes center stage, imbuing the motif with a full-throated lament, marked by the expressive directive "doloroso," signifying profound sadness. The concluding movement's central theme, a direct descendent of the broad, the second theme encountered in the opening movement, is introduced by the solo violin. This theme is subsequently echoed by the viola and, in short order, taken up by the entire orchestra. Against the backdrop of a resolute marching bass, angular triplet patterns accompany a violin melody, reminiscent of the freylekh style, and partially derived from the aforementioned triplets. This musical narrative escalates to a frenzied climax, characterized by the intense tones of the klezmer clarinet, which soon undergoes further development, eventually leading to the triumphant return of the exuberant central theme.

== Instrumentation ==
Concerto Grosso No. 1 is scored for solo violin, solo viola, solo cello, solo clarinet, solo piano, strings with timpani and percussion (performed by 1 player), which consist: triangle, glockenspiel, tam-tam, guiro, tubular bells and suspended cymbal.

== Critical reception ==
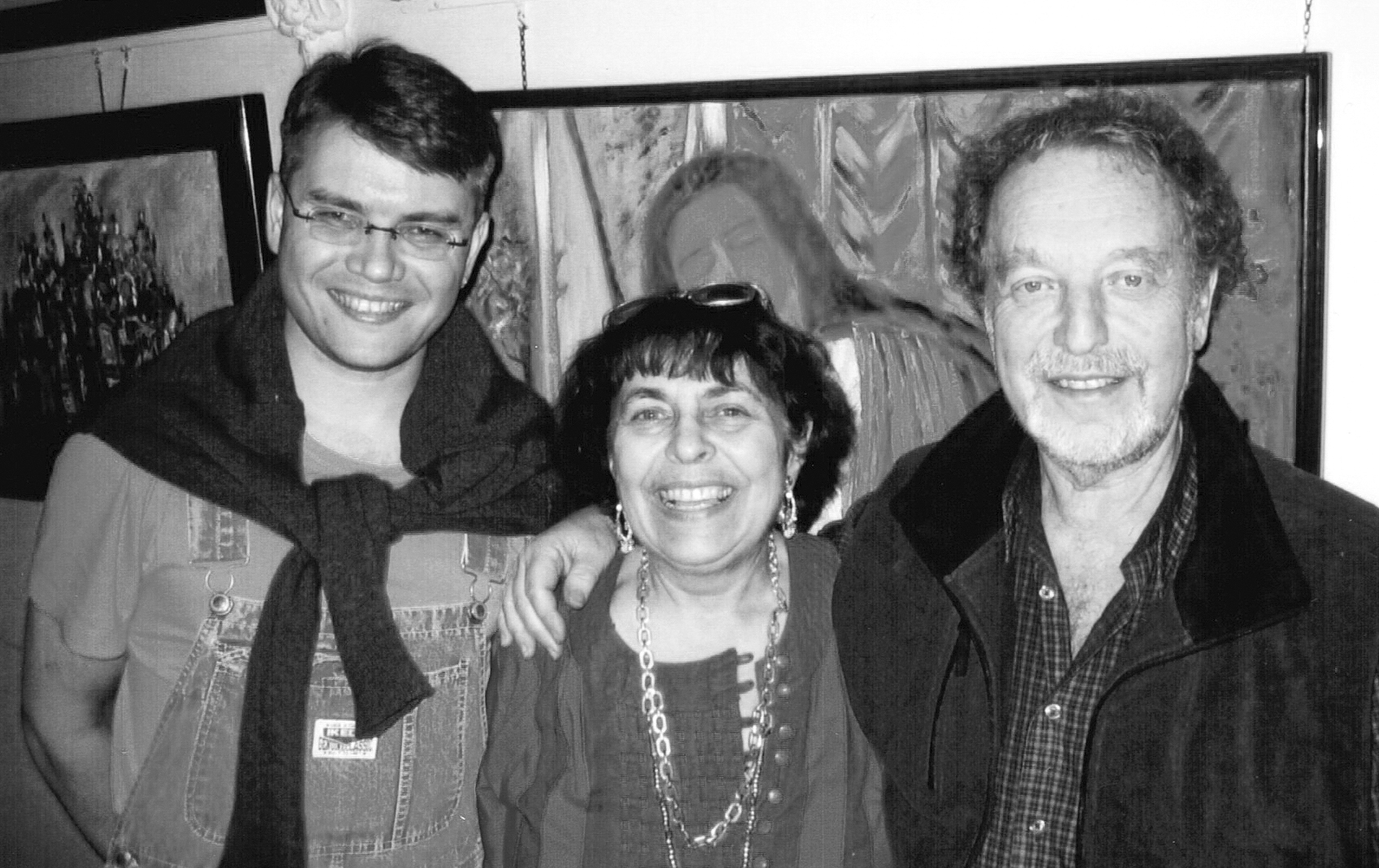
Composer Airat Ichmouratov with Canadian cellist and conductor Yuli Turovsky (to whom Concerto grosso No. 1 is dedicated) and his wife, violinist Eleonora Turovsky, summer 2001

The recording of Concerto Grosso No. 1 gained average-to-positive reviews. Jeremy Pound of BBC Music Magazine wrote: "Filmic, feisty, flamboyant and, admittedly, occasionally a little froth, Ichmouratov’s orchestral music is rarely dull. It benefits here from characterful performances". Carlos Maria Solare of The Strad wrote: "The first movement of Ichmouratov’s Concerto grosso no.1 could be a rewrite of its opposite number in Prokofiev’s ‘Classical’ Symphony, albeit with a more heart-on-sleeve lyrical subject than the older composer might have countenanced". Ateş Orga of ClassicalSource.com wrote: "Enviable confidence, facility and rhythmic tension inform the First Concerto Grosso". David Guttman of Gramophone wrote: "The Concerto grosso No 1, Op 28, is vaguely neo-Baroque fare, fusing Russian and Jewish elements".
