= The Man Who Laughs (disambiguation) =

The Man Who Laughs is a romantic novel by Victor Hugo originally published in June 1869 under the French title L'homme qui rit.

The Man Who Laughs may also refer to:

== Films ==
- The Man Who Laughs, a 1909 lost film made in France; see 1909 in film
- The Man Who Laughs (1928 film), an American silent film
- The Man Who Laughs (1966 film) (L'uomo che ride), an Italian-French film directed by Sergio Corbucci
- L'homme qui rit, a 1971 TV movie directed by Jean Kerchbron and starring Xavier Depraz as Ursus
- The Man Who Laughs (2012 film), a French film

== Other ==
- The Man Who Laughs (opera), an opera by Airat Ichmouratov
- Batman: The Man Who Laughs, a 2005 graphic novel
- "The Man Who Laughs", a song by Rob Zombie from the 2010 album Hellbilly Deluxe 2
