= The Myth of Falcon =

Overture "The Myth of Falcon"
- by Airat Ichmouratov
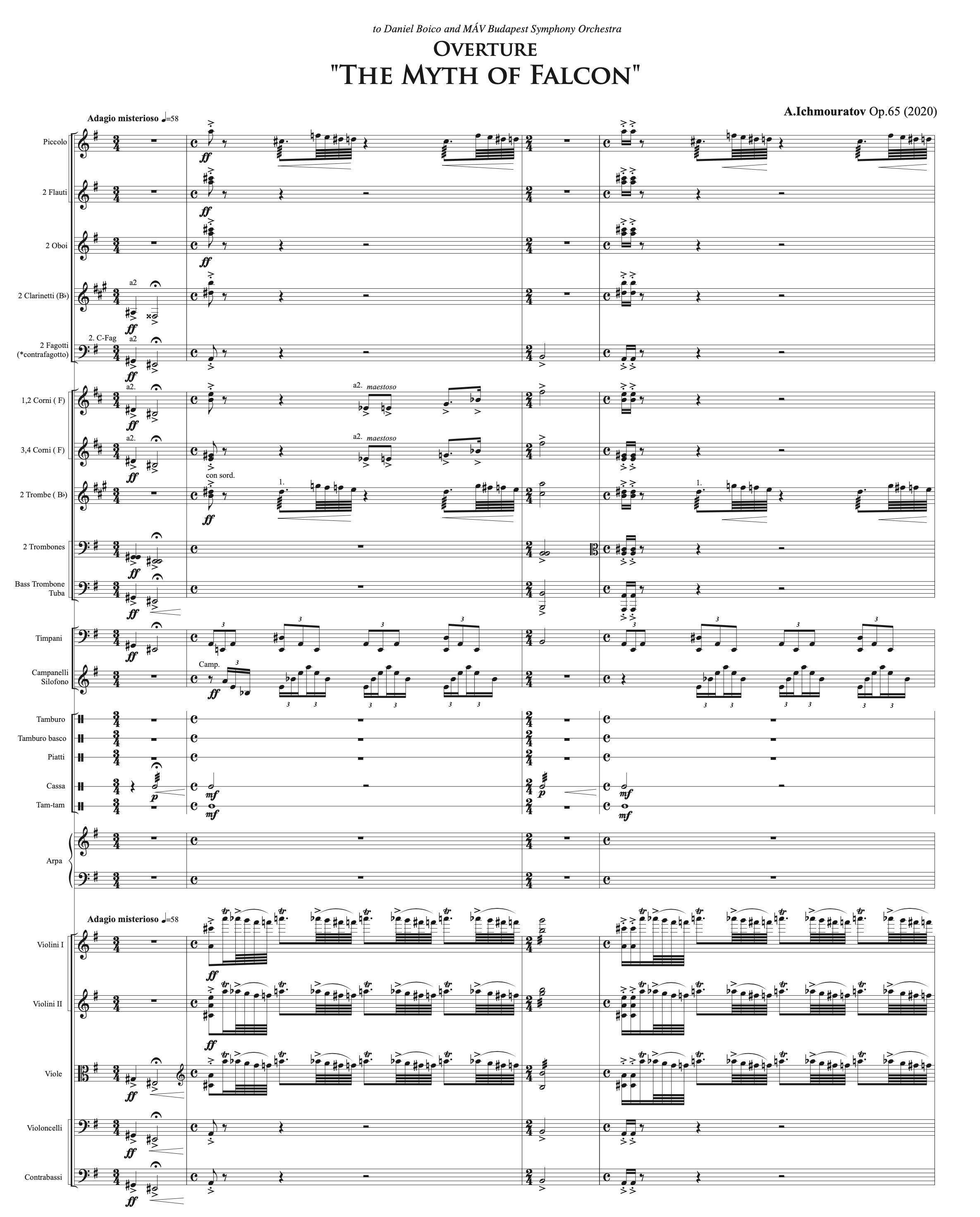
- Overture "The Myth of Falcon" OP.65 by Airat Ichmouratov (first page)
- Opus: 65
- Composed: 2020
- Dedication: Daniel Boico and MAV Budapest Symphony Orchestra
- Duration: 11 minutes
- Movements: 1

Premiere
- Date: 9 October 2020
- Location: Grand Hall, Ferenc Liszt Academy of Music, Budapest
- Conductor: Daniel Boico
- Performers: MAV Budapest Symphony Orchestra

The Overture "The Myth of Falcon", Op. 65, was composed by Airat Ichmouratov during 2019 – 2020 years. It was commissioned and premiered at Grand Hall, Ferenc Liszt Academy of Music, in Budapest, Hungary on 9 October 2020 by MAV Budapest Symphony Orchestra under the baton of Israel-born conductor Daniel Boico.

== Inspiration ==
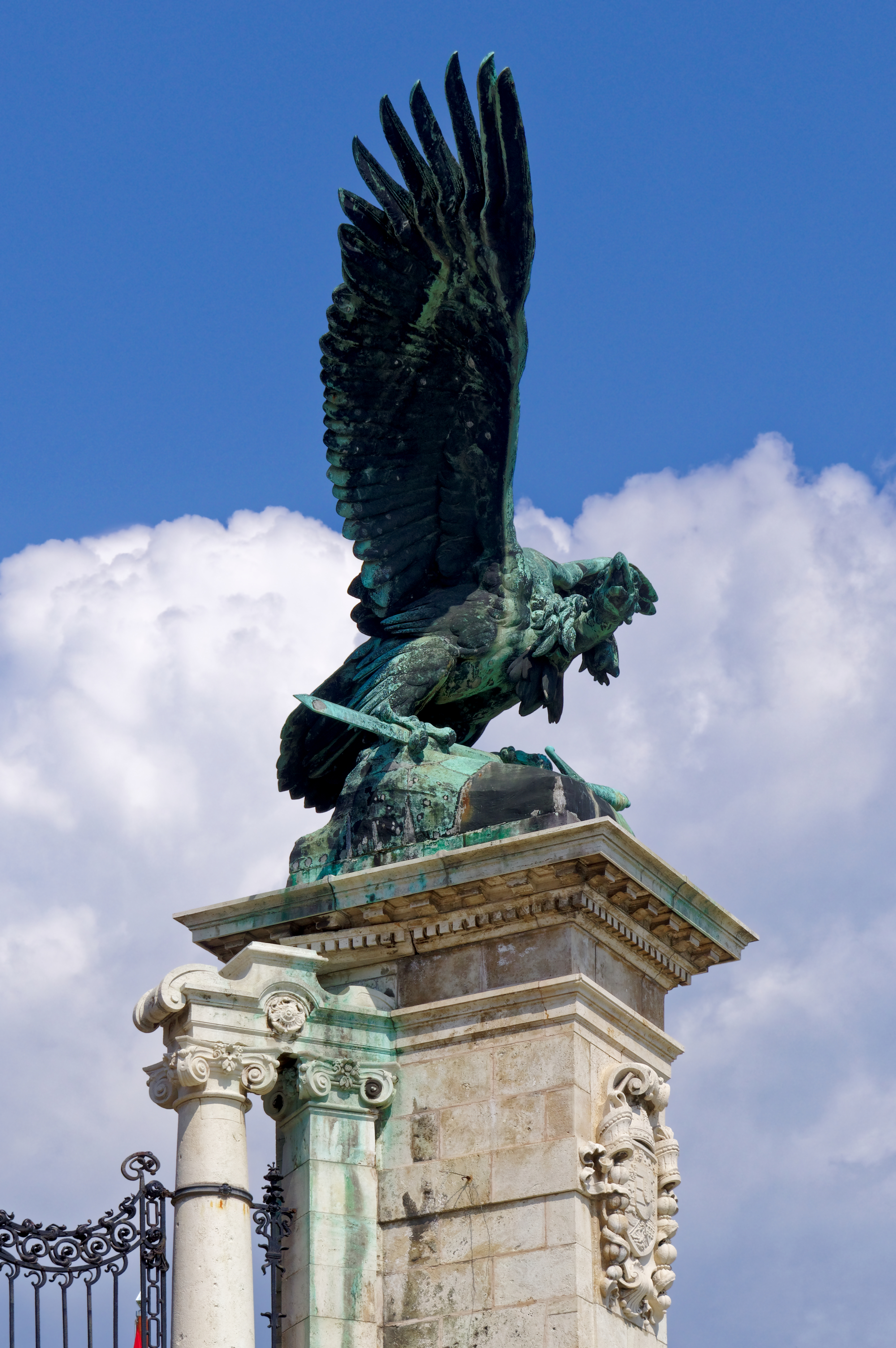
Turul statue, Buda Castle, Budapest

Overture "The Myth of Falcon" Op.65 is inspired by a mystical symbol in the Hungarian legendry - Turul, According to the composer in an interview with Anna Hörömpöli of the MÁV Symphony Orchestra, Ichmouratov wanted to choose a topic close to Budapest and Hungarians in general. This led to the initial title of the Overture - "The Dream of Turul." However, upon discovering that the "Turul" was not solely associated with positive imagery in Hungarian history, Ichmouratov clarified that the work's title carried no political intentions and subsequently changed it to "The Myth of the Falcon". The Turul is a mythological bird of prey, in Hungarian tradition mostly depicted as a hawk or falcon. According to Csibi Loránd of Bocskai Rádió the Turul legend, rooted in Hungary's prehistoric past, serves as a relic of ancient Hungarian faith, embodying divine powers and symbolizing monarchic sovereignty. This mythical bird of prey is revered as the national symbol, representing providence and guiding principles in Hungarian culture.

== Structure ==
The Overture comprises several episodical sections which could be divided into two larger parts. A typical performance lasts somewhat around 11 minutes.

1. Adagio misterioso - Allegro maestoso - Adagio misterioso
2. Allegro rapido - Adagio magnifico

The composer aimed to evoke the gigantic bird's physical reality, monumentality, and flight before the audience's ears, akin to Stravinsky's Firebird soaring through the air.

Regarding the form, Ichmouratov described the piece as a romantic overture without repetition or regularity. Furthermore, the composition incorporates Hungarian folk tunes, such as "Marosszéki kerek erdő"

Example of inspiration from Hungarian traditional folk theme "Marosszéki kerek erdő" in Ichmouratov's Overture "The Myth of Falcon"

mm. 31–34

The Hungarian folk song "Marosszéki kerek erdő" was collected by Hungarian composer Béla Bartók in 1914 in Jobbágytelke, a village in the Maros-Torda County. The area is currently part of Romania and is located in historical Transylvania. From 1876 to 1920, it was an administrative unit in the eastern part of the Kingdom of Hungary. Bartók discovered "Marosszéki kerek erdő" along with 42 other Transylvanian upper summer folk songs, subsequently bringing them to Budapest.

The Hungarian folk song "Marosszéki kerek erdő" which Ichmouratov integrated into his Overture "The Myth of Falcon"

== Instrumentation ==
External audio
- Performed by MAV Budapest Symphony Orchestra, Daniel Boico, conductor
- I. Adagio misterioso - Allegro maestoso - Adagio misterioso II.Allegro rapido - Adagio magnifico

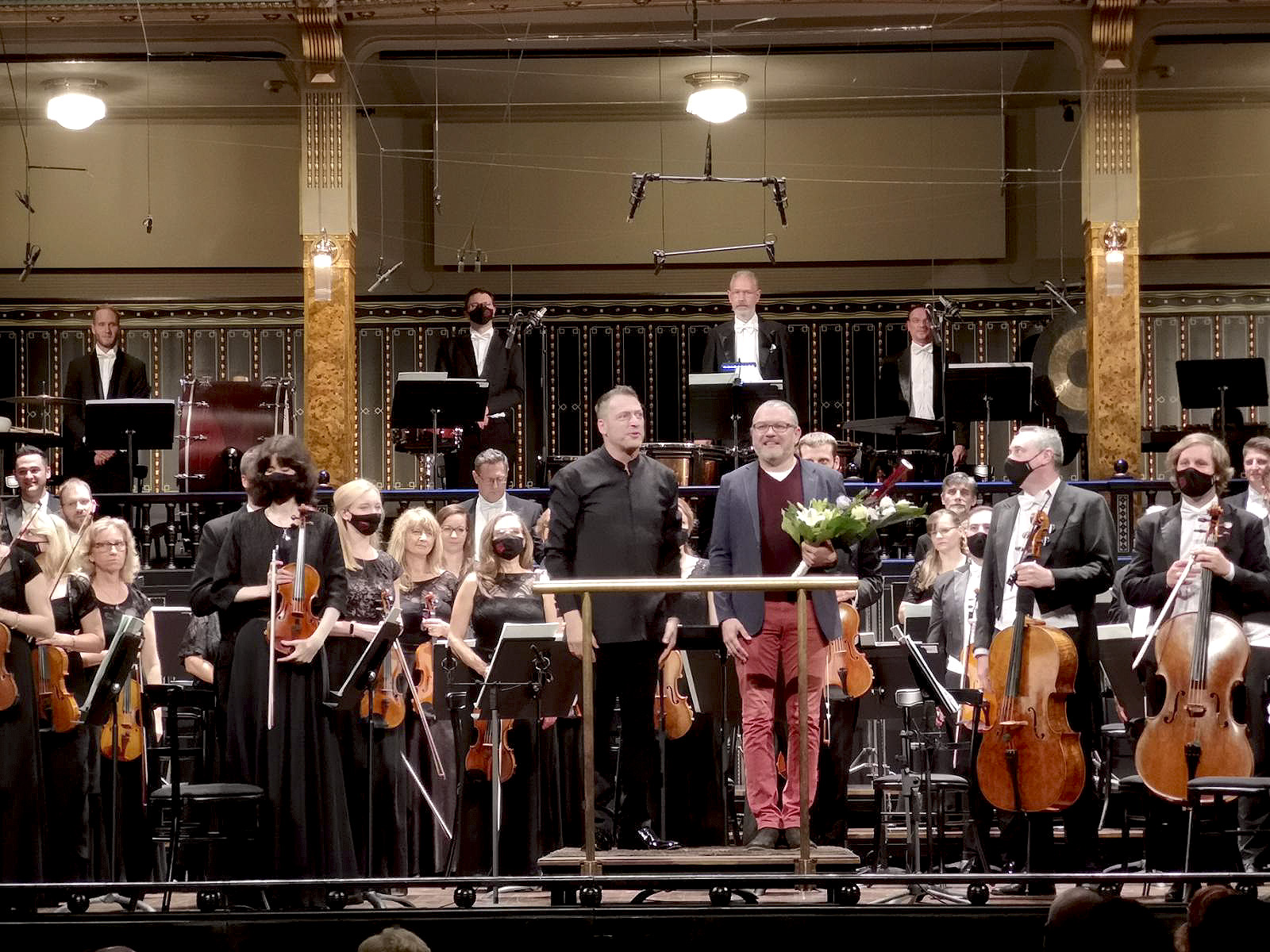
Composer Airat Ichmouratov and conductor Daniel Boico after the premiere of the Overture "The Myth of Falcon" by MAV Budapest Symphony Orchestra. Grand Hall, Ferenc Liszt Academy of Music, Budapest, 9 October 2020.

The Overture "The Myth of Falcon" is scored for the following orchestra (percussion, performed by 4 players):

- 1 flute piccolo
- 2 flutes
- 2 oboes
- 2 clarinets in B♭
- 2 bassoons (second doubles contrabasson)
- 4 horns in F
- 2 trumpets in B♭
- 3 trombones: tenor, bass
- tuba
- timpani
- triangle
- cymbals
- tambourine
- snare drum
- bass drum
- tam tam
- glockenspiel
- xylophone
- tubular bells
- harp
- strings
