= Praeludium in G major for Cello Solo, Op. 69 =

Praeludium in G Major for Cello Solo
- by Airat Ichmouratov
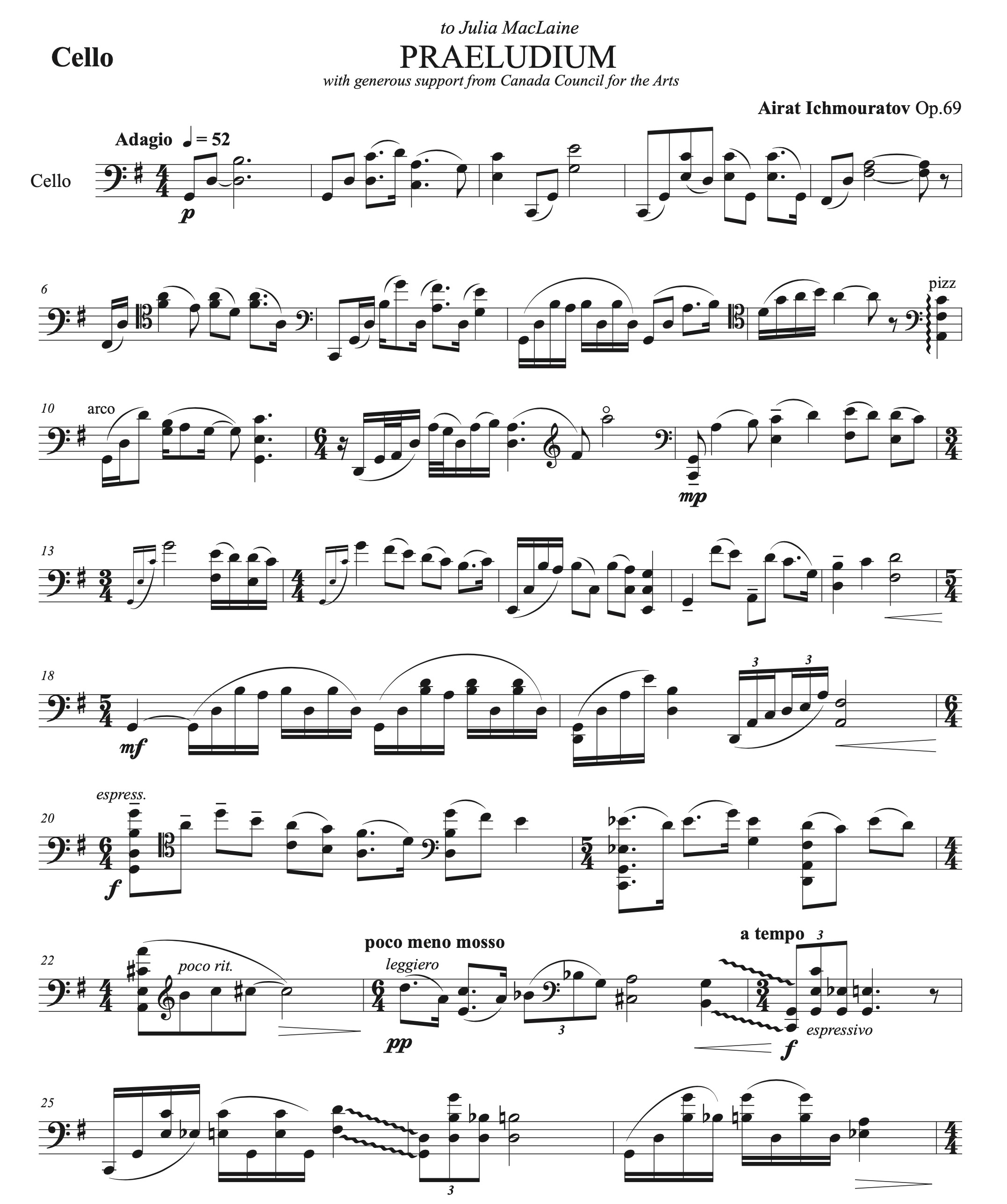
- Praeludium in G Major for Cello Solo, Op. 69 by Airat Ichmouratov (front page)
- Opus: 69
- Composed: 5 July 2021
- Dedication: Julia MacLaine
- Duration: 6 minutes (approximately)
- Movements: 1
- Scoring: Cello solo

Praeludium in G Major for Cello Solo, Op. 69 is a composition by the Russian-Canadian composer Airat Ichmouratov. It was commissioned and premiered and recorded by Julia Maclaine, a Canadian cellist, an assistant Principal Cello of the National Arts Centre Orchestra. MacLaine found the inspiration for this project in a Juilliard recital by American cellist Bonnie Hampton in which the Preludes from Bach’s Solo Cello Suites were interspersed with contemporary works. With funding from the Canada Council, MacLaine commissioned six Canadian composers to write works “in response” to the Bach preludes. Praeludium in G Major was inspired by Bach's Prelude from Cello Suite No. 1 in G Major.

== Critical reception ==
The recording of the Praeludium gained average-to-positive reviews. Laurence Vittes of The Strings Magazine wrote: "Praeludium, Op. 69 is richly reminiscent of the original with wonderful amber overtones". David Olds from The Whole Note - Editor Corner wrote: Airat Ichmouratov whose quite traditional Praeludium for Cello Solo in G Major, Op.69 quotes freely from Bach before venturing onto less familiar paths.
