= Piano Concerto (Ichmouratov) =

Piano concerto

- by Airat Ichmouratov
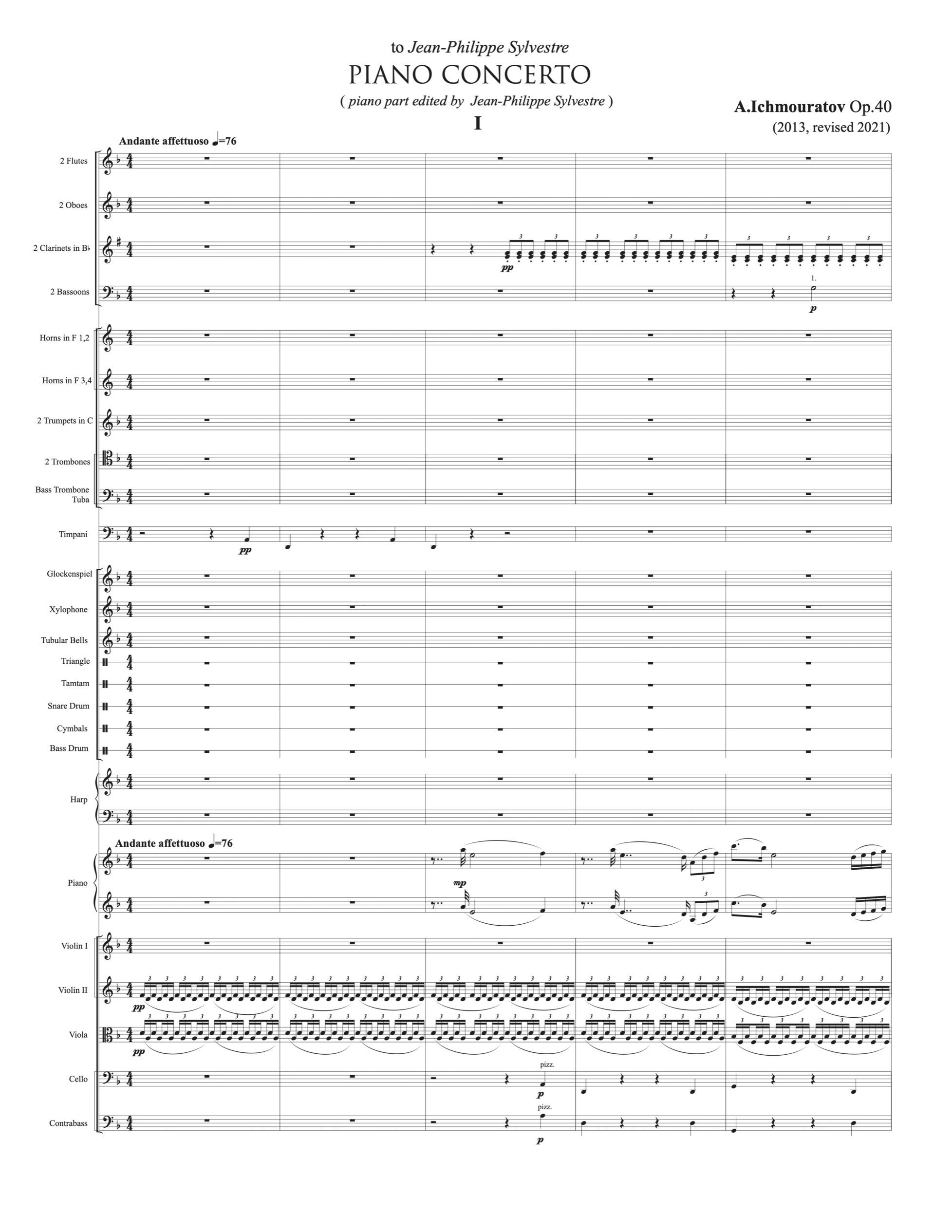
- Piano Concerto by Airat Ichmouratov, conductor's score (front page)
- Opus: 40
- Composed: 2012–2013
- Dedication: Jean-Philippe Sylvestre
- Recorded: Chandos Records – CHAN 5281 (released in June 2023), Jean-Philippe Sylvestre piano, London Symphony Orchestra
- Duration: 38 minutes
- Movements: three

Premiere
- Date: 1 May 2024
- Location: Palais Montcalm, Quebec City
- Conductor: Airat Ichmouratov
- Performers: Jean-Philippe Sylvestre piano, Quebec Symphony Orchestra

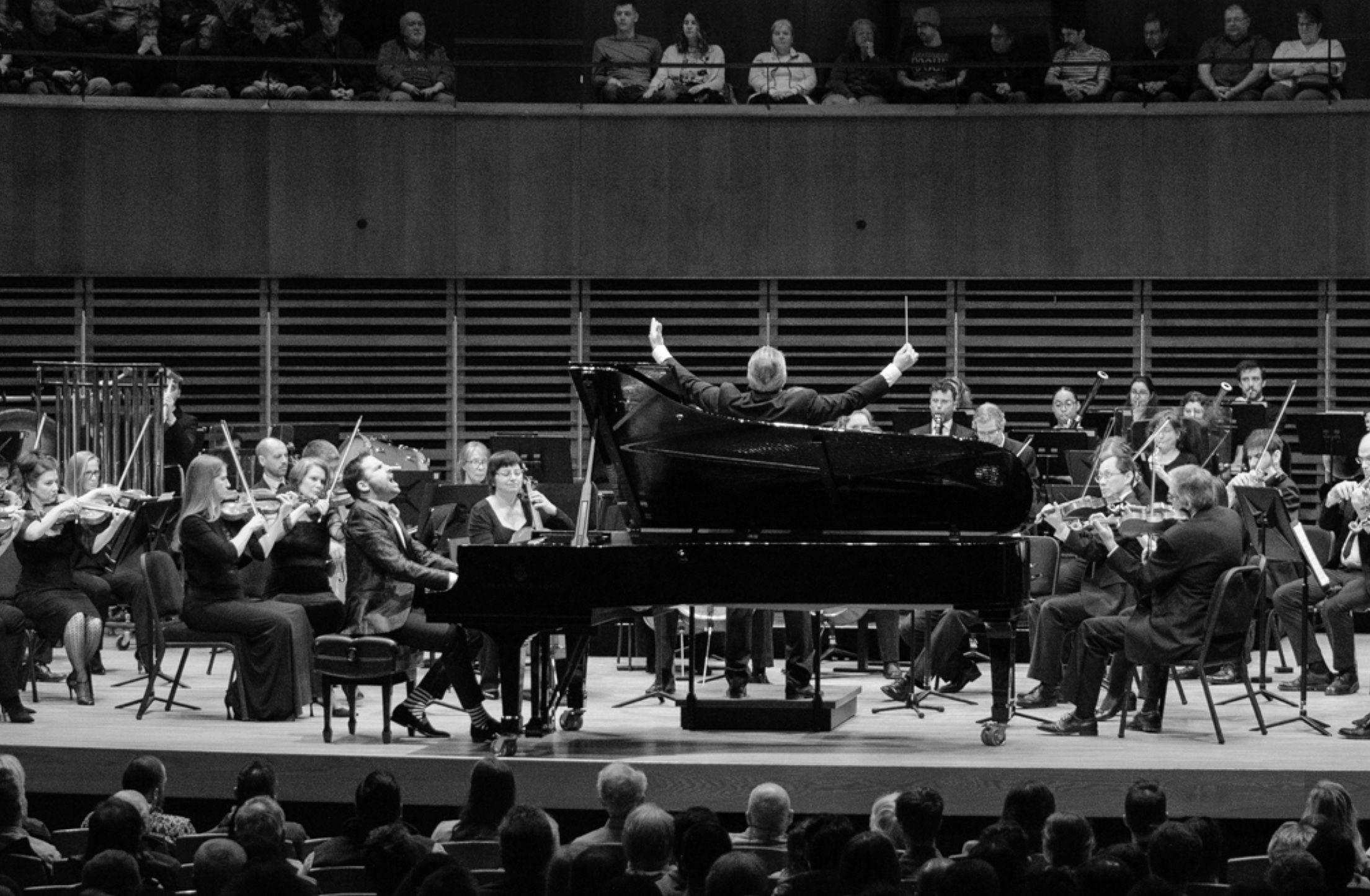
The world premiere of Airat Ichmouratov's Piano Concerto, Jean Philippe Sylvestre piano, Quebec Symphony Orchestra, Palais Montcalm, Quebec, May 1, 2024

The Piano Concerto, Op. 40, is a work for piano and orchestra completed by Airat Ichmouratov between 2012 and 2013. Composition remained untouched for a span of ten years until the composer crossed paths with a soloist, Montreal-based pianist Jean-Philippe Sylvestre. Sylvestre's keen enthusiasm for performing the concerto, coupled with his ability to "do it justice and add finishing touches," as described by the composer, led to the revival of the piece. The Piano Concerto was recorded by Chandos on April 19–20, 2022, at St. Luke's in London, with Jean-Philippe Sylvestre as the soloist and the London Symphony Orchestra under the baton of the composer. Its first public performance took place on May 1, 2024, at the Palais Montcalm in Quebec City, with Sylvestre as the soloist, accompanied by the Quebec Symphony Orchestra under Ichmouratov.

== Structure ==
External audio
- Performed by Jean-Philippe Sylvestre with the London Symphony Orchestra under Airat Ichmouratov
- I. Andante affettuoso
- II. Grave Solenne
- III. Allegro moderato

The Concerto comprises 3 movements. A typical performance lasts somewhat around 38 minutes.

1. Andante affettuoso
2. Grave Solenne
3. Allegro moderato

Ichmouratov, recognized as a significant figure in contemporary neo-romantic music internationally and often hailed as a prominent Russian musical figure in Quebec, openly acknowledges the influence of esteemed Russian composers such as Tchaikovsky, Rachmaninoff, Prokofiev, Mussorgsky, and Shostakovich, among others, on his music. This influence is evident in his typical style, characterized by neo-romanticism, in this case, a Piano Concerto, featuring melodious and harmonically rich content infused with elements drawn from Russian folk music.

According to Geoff Pearce of Classical Music Daily the composition unfolds across three distinct movements. Exhibiting a romantic flair, the musical style is characterized by virtuosity and a somewhat rhapsodic nature. Filled with abundant energy, it includes frequent mood changes. The first movement encapsulates the essence of the entire piece and could function effectively as an independent work. It traverses a spectrum of emotions, ranging from fervently virtuosic passages to moments of dramatic intensity and serene reflection. The orchestral sections demonstrate skillful composition, while the solo passages require significant technical proficiency from the instruments, especially the woodwinds. The piano part adheres to the tradition of late nineteenth-century Russian piano concertos. Ateş Orga mentions in his article on Colin's Column the form of the concerto, labeling it as an "episodic traversal". He describes the Piano Concerto as an episodic journey, traversing through tempo-contrasted sections. Ideas, once introduced, are revisited in various forms—sometimes abbreviated, hinted at, or even left unresolved—reflecting the unpredictable nature of Ichmouratov's approach to keys. "When I compose, I'm guided by a particular tonality and simply follow its course, often leading to unexpected key relationships," composer explains. Michael Church of BBC Music Magazine also calls Ichmouratov's form in Piano concerto as "episodic".

=== I. Andante affettuoso - Allegro vivace - Andante cantabile - Allegro vivace ===
From the beginning, the timpani alternate between tonic and dominant, as observed in Arthur Kaptainis's analysis. The piano enters with a contemplative melody in D Minor, softly articulated in octaves. This theme evolves harmonically and transitions into an Allegro vivace, where the piano and woodwinds engage in exchange. The buoyant atmosphere gradually diminishes as the piano introduces a noble Andante cantabile theme through a short recitative in G minor. A grand climax featuring the full orchestra gives way to a piano cadenza. Although the recapitulation initially returns to the expected home key of D minor, it eventually resolves in a resolute conclusion in G minor, accentuated by the soloist's assertive fortissimo double octaves.

Main theme in the first movement of Ichmouratov's Piano concerto, Piano solo part

mm. 3–6

Allegro vivace theme in the first movement of Ichmouratov's Piano concerto, Piano solo part

mm. 16–17

Andante Cantabile theme in the first movement of Ichmouratov's Piano concerto, Piano solo part

mm. 155–158

=== II. Grave Solenne ===
Arthur Kaptainis notes that the Ichmouratov regards the central movement, Grave solenne, as a personal reflection encompassing "my thoughts, my feelings, my nostalgia, my sorrow, and my happiness." It begins with a solemn chorale for strings, evoking heartfelt sentiments reminiscent of the final movement of Mahler's Third Symphony. Although initially in C Major, the atmosphere conveys a distinct melancholy, with much of the movement set in C Minor. The piano enters quietly against the gentle clock-like pulse of a harp. Initially, the winds share the spotlight equally, but gradually, the soloist takes charge with increasingly assertive chords. A dramatical climax in C Major is followed by a section where the piano engages in delicate exchanges with the woodwinds and this time clock-like pulse of a glockenspiel. Finally, a soft chord from the piano settles the tonal dispute in favor of the minor mode.

Grave Solenne theme in the second movement of Ichmouratov's Piano concerto, Piano solo part

mm. 464–467

=== III. Allegro moderato - Andante - Tempo I ===
The finale takes a hopeful turn, Allegro moderato commencing with a burst of orchestral grandeur. Amidst the commotion, the piano introduces an energetic melody in B flat, followed by other instruments, including the xylophone. Trills lead to the introduction of the Andante's second theme by the oboe, sharing the signature rising triplet figure with the previous theme. After some development, including the return of the fanfare, the main theme resurfaces in B flat Minor, following an energetic section marked con sarcasmo. Strings then take over with longer passages played against a restless pulse. The final rendition of the main theme deviates from the expected B flat Major to C Major, the key symbolizing hope in the slow movement.

Allegro moderato theme in the third movement of Ichmouratov's Piano concerto, Piano solo part

mm. 551–554

Presto impetuoso theme, marked as con Sarcasmo in the third movement of Ichmouratov's Piano concerto, Piano solo part

mm. 637–641

== Instrumentation ==
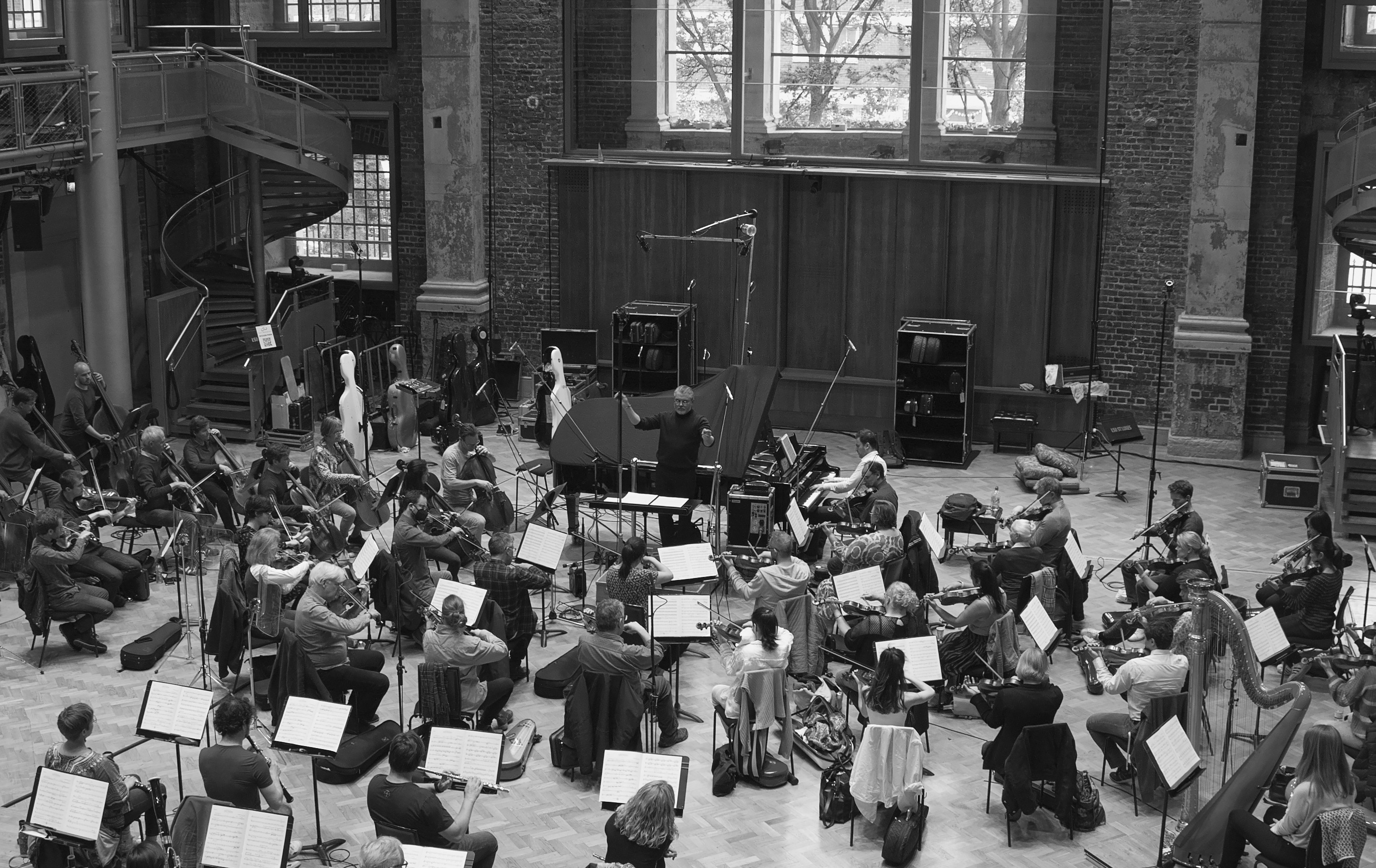
Recording by Chandos Records of Airat Ichmouratov's Piano Concerto with Jean-Philippe Sylvestre and the London Symphony Orchestra, St. Luke's in London

The Piano Concerto is scored for the following orchestra (percussion, performed by 3 players):

- 2 flutes
- 2 oboes
- 2 clarinets in B♭
- 2 bassoons
- 4 horns in F
- 2 trumpets in B♭
- 3 trombones: tenor, bass
- Tuba
- Timpani
- Triangle
- Cymbals
- Snare drum
- Bass drum
- Tubular bells
- Tam tam
- Glockenspiel
- Xylophone
- Harp
- Strings

== Recording ==
- Chandos Records: CHAN 5281 - Ichmouratov: Viola Concerto No.1/Piano Concerto; London Symphony Orchestra, Jean-Philippe Sylvestre piano, Airat Ichmouratov conductor

== Critical reception ==
The world premiere of the Piano Concerto took place in a sold-out concert and received generally favorable reviews. Emmanuel Bernier of Le Soleil wrote: "The piano section offers significant advantages to the performer, featuring double octaves and expansive, harmonically rich chords. Ichmouratov, demonstrating adept orchestration skills, integrates the orchestra as an equal partner with its own distinct voice."

The recording of the Piano Concerto gained average-to-positive reviews. Michael Church of BBC Music Magazine wrote: "Ichmouratov clearly loves what he can do in a pianissimo environment, teasing the listener into following intricate paths". Gregor Tassie of MusicWeb International noted: "Ichmouratov is a talented orchestrator, yet his music is devoid of originality". Frédéric Cardin of Panm360 transcribed: "...Ichmouratov's music very accessible, well written and often remarkably orchestrated". Barry Forshaw of Classical Cd Choice wrote: "The Volga-Tatar-born Canadian Airat Ichmouratov ably conducts the London Symphony Orchestra" Geoff Perce of Classical Music Daily described Ichmouratov's music as "colourful and free from pretence." Jean Lacroix of Crescendo Magazine wrote: "...undeniable qualities in the field of orchestral treatment: demonstration and luxuriance, vitality and solemnity, expressiveness and melodic capacity."
