= Maslenitsa Overture =

Orchestral work by Airat Ichmouratov

- by Airat Ichmouratov
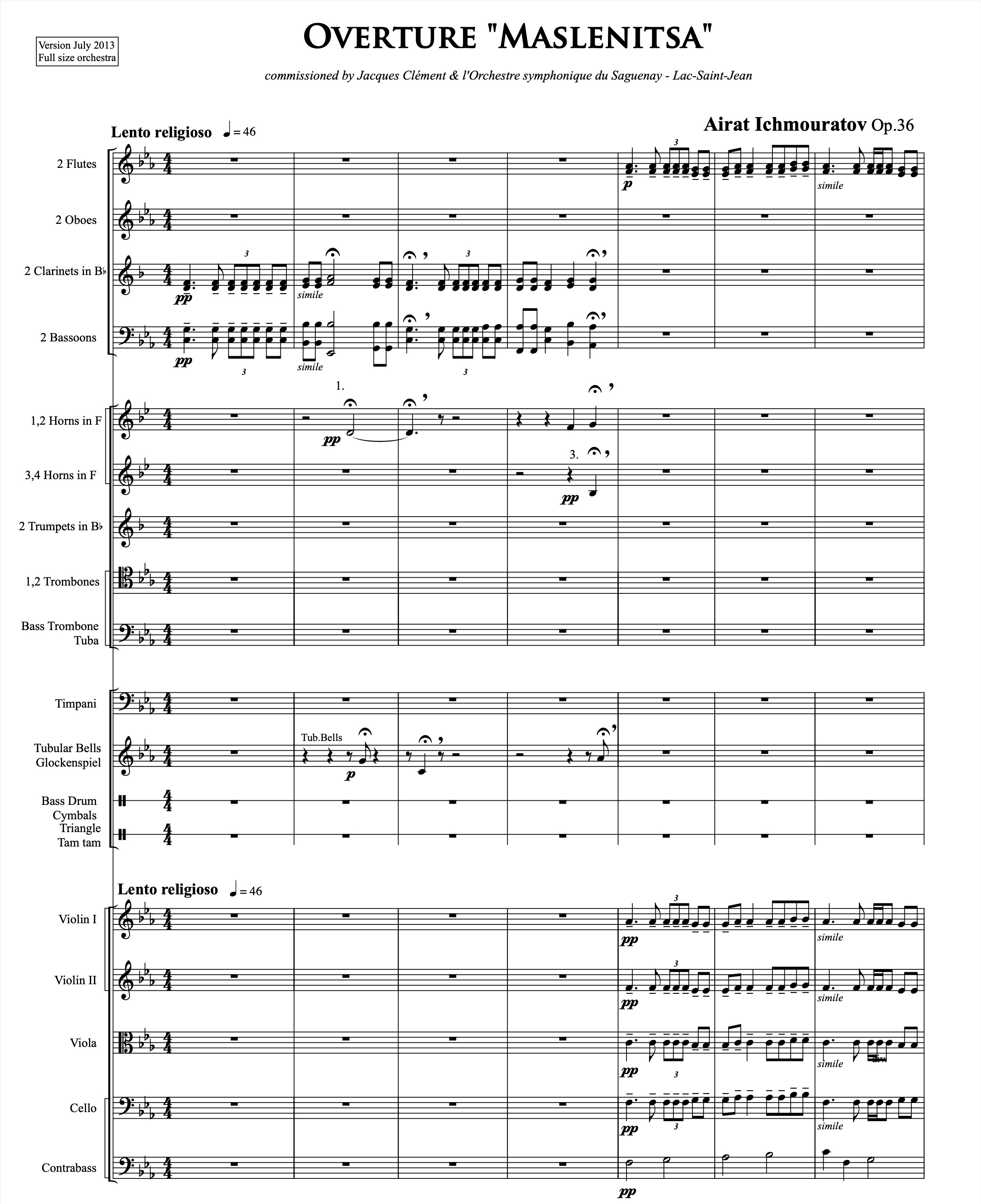
- Maslenitsa Overture Op.36 by Airat Ichmouratov (front page)
- Opus: 36
- Composed: 2012–2013
- Dedication: Jacques Clément & l'Orchestre symphonique du Saguenay – Lac-Saint-Jean
- Recorded: Chandos Records – CHAN 20172 (June 2020)
- Duration: 11 minutes

Premiere
- Date: 24 February 2013
- Location: Théâtre C de Chicoutimi
- Conductor: Jacques Clément
- Performers: l'Orchestre symphonique du Saguenay – Lac-Saint-Jean

The Overture Maslenitsa, Op. 36, was composed by Airat Ichmouratov during the years of 2012 and 2013. It was commissioned and premiered in Chicoutimi, Canada on 24 February 2013 by L'Orchestre Symphonique du Saguenay–Lac-Saint-Jean under the baton of French-Canadian conductor Jacques Clément.

== Structure ==
The Overture comprises several sections which could be divided into two larger parts.

1. Lento religioso – Poco più mosso – Allegro brillante – Maestoso –
2. Lento – Allegro brillante – Presto festivo – Moderato maestoso – Poco meno mosso – Presto festivo

A typical performance lasts somewhat around 11 minutes.

== Instrumentation ==
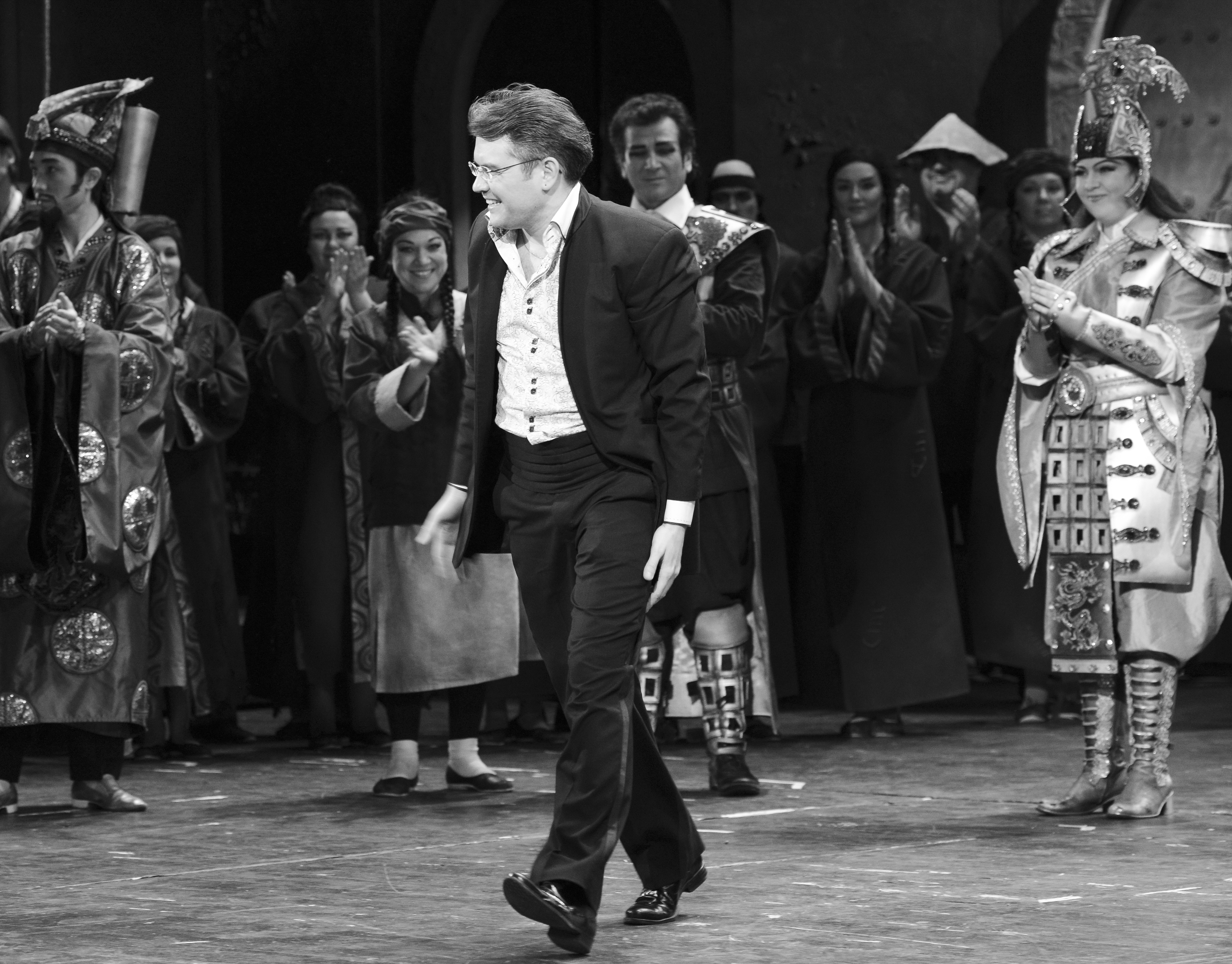
Airat Ichmouratov in 2012, at the time he wrote Overture Maslenitsa

This symphony is scored for the following orchestra (percussion, performed by 3 players):

- 2 flutes (second doubling piccolo)
- 2 oboes
- 2 clarinets in B♭
- 2 bassoons
- 4 horns in F
- 2 trumpets in B♭
- 3 trombones: tenor, bass
- Tuba
- Timpani
- Triangle
- Cymbals
- Bass drum
- Tam tam
- Glockenspiel
- Tubular bells
- Strings

== Recording ==
- Chandos Records: CHAN 20172 – Ichmouratov; Overtures/Symphony; Orchestre de la Francophonie; Jean-Philippe Tremblay, conductor

== Critical reception ==
The recording of the Maslenitsa Overture gained average-to-positive reviews. David Nice of BBC Music Magazine wrote: "The ‘Maslenitsa’ Overture, celebrating the Russian shrovetide festival, is all generic stuff". Guy Rickards of Gramophone wrote: "A vibrantly orchestrated homage to Glinka and Mussorgsky". Colin Clarke of Classical Explorer wrote: "Maslenitsa Overture, a colourful musical picture of the week before Lent".
