= Borodin Trio =

The Borodin Trio was a classical music trio founded in 1976 by Russians Rostislav Dubinsky (1923–97), his wife, pianist Luba Edlina (1929-2018), and cellist Yuli Turovsky (1939–2013), after Dubinsky, founding first violinist of the famed Borodin Quartet, emigrated from the U.S.S.R. to the Netherlands and later to the United States. (The Borodin Quartet had been named after Alexander Borodin, who was one of Russian chamber music's founders.)

The Borodin Trio was best known for its recordings on Chandos Records. They were considered to be one of the best piano trios of their generation. Dubinsky and Edlina also performed as The Dubinsky Duo. Turovsky and Edlina also performed as the Borodin Duo. Laszlo Varga replaced Turovsky as cellist in 1991 or 1992.
