= The Man Who Laughs (opera) =

2023 opera by Airat Ichmouratov

- Opera by Airat Ichmouratov
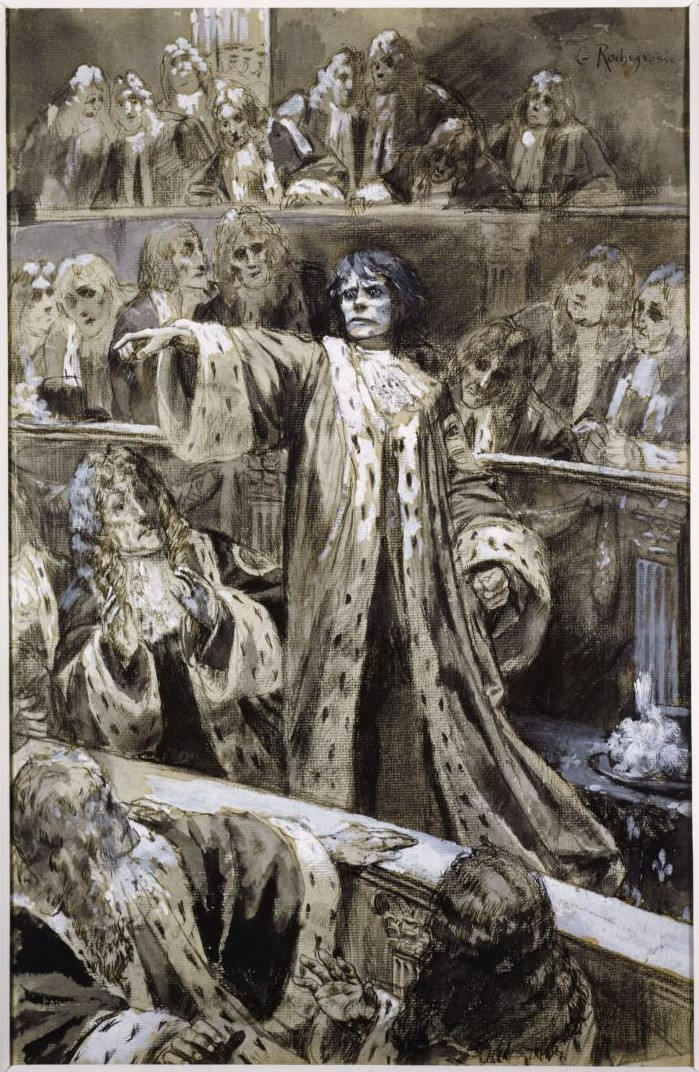
- The Man Who Laughs - Gwynplaine delivering his speech in the House of Lords (drawing by Georges-Antoine Rochegrosse, Victor Hugo's house, circa 1886)
- Librettist: Bertrand Laverdure
- Language: French
- Based on: Victor Hugo's novelThe Man Who Laughs
- Premiere: 31 May 2023; Claude Champagne Hall, Montreal

The Man Who Laughs is an opera in two acts with a prologue by Canadian composer Airat Ichmouratov, to a libretto in French by poet Bertrand Laverdure, adapted from the eponymous 1869 novel by Victor Hugo. Commissioned by Festival Classica, it was premiered in concert version, conducted by Airat Ichmouratov on May 31, 2023, in Montreal, Canada.

The opera is set in England in two parts. First in 1690, in the prologue, when the poet and showman Ursus meets ten-year-old Gwynplaine, who is disfigured, and one-year-old Dea, who is blind. Both are orphans and Ursus adopts them. Then, fifteen years later, in 1705, Ursus's play about Gwynplaine and Dea became a great success. They gave a performance in London. On this occasion, Gwynplaine is confronted with his past as an aristocrat's child by the lawman Barkilphedro. He is seduced by Duchess Josiane and ends up denying his new reality as Lord. But it's too late to turn back the clock. Déa, his love, dies, and as soon as he finds her, Gwynplaine no longer wants to live and takes his own life.

== Roles ==
Roles, voice types, premier cast
Role	Voice type	Premiere cast, 31 May 2023
Gwynplaine, street performer (age 25)	baritone	Hugo Laporte
Gwynplaine child (10 years)	soprano	Janelle Lucyck
Ursus, poet and showman (50 years)	bass-baritone	Marc Boucher
Barkilphedro, lawman (50 years)	baritone	Jean-François Lapointe
Duchess Josiane, aristocrat (32 years)	mezzo-soprano	Florence Bourget
Fibi, bohemian (23 years)	soprano	Sophie Naubert
Dea, street performer (16 years)	soprano	Magali Simard-Galdès
Lord David, aristocrat (40 years)	tenor	Antonio Figueroa
Villagers, spectators in London, Lords in the House of Lords

== Instrumentation ==
The Man Who Laughs is scored for two flutes (the second doubling piccolo); two oboes; two clarinets in B-flat; two bassoons (the second doubling contrabassoon; four French horns; two trumpets; three trombones; one bass trombone; tuba; a percussion section with timpani, cymbals, triangle, snare drum, bass drum, tam-tam, glockenspiel, xylophone, tubular bells, wind machine; harp; and strings.
