= Yuli Turovsky =

Canadian conductor

- Юлий Туровский
- Born: 7 July 1939; Moscow, Soviet Union
- Died: 15 January 2013 (aged 73); Montreal, Quebec, Canada
- Education: Moscow Conservatory
- Years active: 1969-2013
- Employers: Moscow Conservatory; Moscow Chamber Orchestra; Conservatoire de musique du Québec à Montréal; Université de Montréal; I Musici de Montréal Chamber Orchestra
- Known for: Founder of the I Musici de Montréal Chamber Orchestra
- Spouse: Eleonora Turovsky (née Leonova)
- Children: 1
- Awards: National Order of Quebec, 2010; Order of Canada, Officer, 2012; Prix Opusl, 2012
- Musical career
- Occupations: Conductor; music educator
- Instrument: Cello
- Formerly of: Borodin Trio

Yuli Turovsky OC CQ (Russian: Юлий Туровский; 1939 – 2013) was a Soviet-born Canadian cellist, conductor and music educator, known for founding the I Musici de Montréal Chamber Orchestra.

== Early life and education ==
Turovsky was born on the 7 July 1939 in Moscow in the Soviet Union (present-day, Russia). In 1946, Turovsky began studying the cello at Moscow Central Music School. In 1957, Turovsky enrolled at the Moscow Conservatory where he studied under Galina Kozolupova. Turovsky graduated with a diploma in 1962, and subsequently earned his doctorate in 1969.

== Life in the Soviet Union ==
In 1969 Turovsky obtained first prize at the Soviet-wide cello competition and second prize at the Prague Spring International Music Festival. He also became the lead cello for the Moscow Chamber Orchestra which Rudolf Barshai had founded about fifteen years earlier and this association marked the beginning of Turovsky's recording career. In parallel to his work as a performing cellist, Turovsky taught at the Central Music School and the Conservatory and conducted the chamber orchestra of a local school. In 1976 he left Russia with his wife Eleonora (herself a professional violinist), his daughter Natasha and his father and settled in Montreal in 1977.

== Life in Montreal ==
In 1976 Turovsky and fellow Soviet emigrants Rostislav Dubinsky (violin) and Luba Edlina (piano) founded the Borodin Trio.

Turovsky founded the I Musici de Montréal Chamber Orchestra in 1983. The orchestra originally consisted of music students from Montreal, many of whom were or had been students of Turovsky and his wife. Under Turovsky's direction and with Eleonora as first violin, I Musici became one of the best known classical ensembles of Canada, toured extensively in Canada, in the United States and abroad and produced over thirty recordings. Turovsky's health forced him to step down as the artistic director and conductor in 2011.

Turovsky taught at the Conservatoire de musique du Québec à Montréal from 1977 to 1985 and at the Université de Montréal from 1979 until the early 2010s as his health declined. One of his last students, Stéphane Tétreault, is regarded as one of the top young talents in classical music in Canada.

Turovsky was a Knight of the National Order of Quebec (2010) and an Officer of the Order of Canada (2012). He received the 2012 Prix Opusl lifetime achievement award from the Quebec Music Council.

Turovsky died in Montreal on 15 January 2013 from complications due to Parkinson's disease. He was 73. His wife Eleonora died in March 2012.
