= I Musici de Montréal Chamber Orchestra =

Canadian chamber orchestra

I Musici de Montréal is a Canadian chamber orchestra, founded in 1984 by cellist and conductor Yuli Turovsky.

== About ==
I Musici de Montréal Chamber Orchestra plays a varied repertoire ranging from the 17th century to the present day. It has performed in New York's Lincoln Center and Carnegie Hall, the Gewandhaus in Leipzig, the Seiji Ozawa Hall in Tanglewood, the Tonhalle in Zürich, the Palais des Beaux-Arts in Brussels, the Kioi Hall in Tokyo and the Conservatoire de Musique in Luxembourg.

The director is Yuli Turovsky, who also has performed as cello soloist with the orchestra. From 2011 to 2020 the principal conductor of I Musici de Montréal was Jean-Marie Zeitouni. In 2020, Jean-François Rivest was appointed artistic advisor and principal guest conductor.

== Awards ==
I Musici de Montréal has released more than 40 CDs for the Chandos and Analekta Record Labels. Their 1988 recording of Dmitri Shostakovich's 14th Symphony won a Diapason d'Or, and their Concerti grossi, Op. 6 by George Frideric Handel was awarded a 1992 Penguin Guide Rosette.

In December 1998, the Conseil Québécois de la Musique gave two Opus Awards to the orchestra for Recording Event of the Year and Best Recording - contemporary music for a CD grouping works by Henryk Górecki, Arvo Pärt and Alfred Schnittke. In 1999, I Musici de Montréal was awarded the Grand Prix by the Montreal Urban Community for their contribution to music presentation in and around Montreal.

In August 2001, BBC Music Magazine named as its CD of the Month I Musici de Montréal's 40th CD, a recording of Nikolai Myaskovsky, Schnittke and Edison Denisov, calling it a Russian tour de force. In April 2002, I Musici was nominated for another Canadian Juno Award as Best Classical Album of the Year, after having won a Juno for their recording of Alberto Ginastera, Heitor Villa-Lobos and José Evangelista.
