= University of Toronto Faculty of Music =

Music school at the University of Toronto

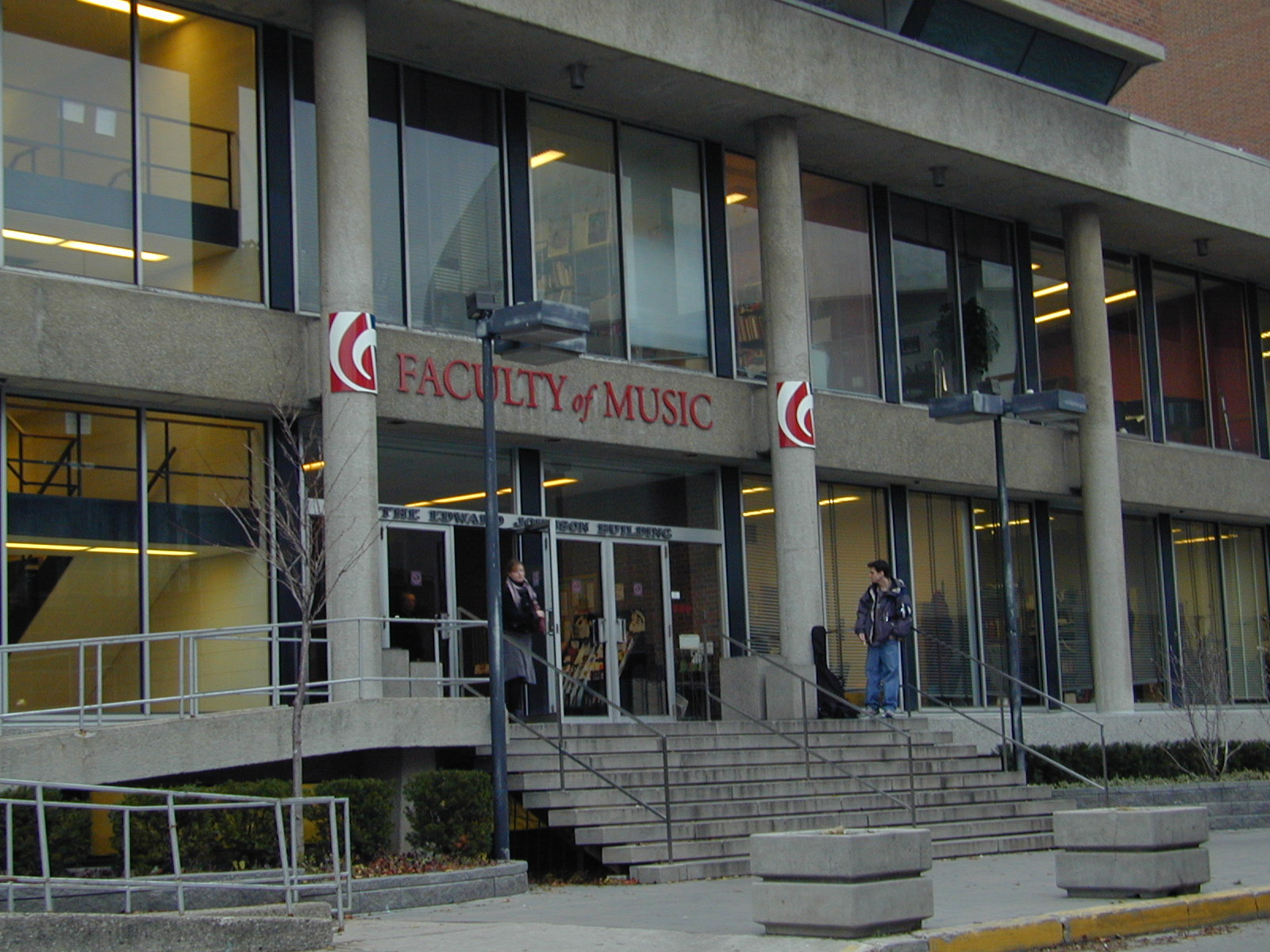
- The Edward Johnson building
- Type: Public music school
- Established: 1918; 108 years ago
- Parent institution: University of Toronto
- Dean: Ryan McClelland
- Location: Toronto, Ontario, Canada; 43°40′00″N 79°23′41″W
- Website: music.utoronto.ca

The Faculty of Music is the music school at the University of Toronto. The Faculty of Music is located in the Edward Johnson Building on the St. George campus, just south of the Royal Ontario Museum and north of Queen's Park, west of the Museum subway station. MacMillan Theatre and Walter Hall are located in the Edward Johnson Building. The Faculty of Music South building contains rehearsal rooms and offices, and the Upper Jazz Studio performance space is located at 90 Wellesley Street West. Professor Ryan McClelland was appointed Acting Dean on November 1, 2023, and Interim Dean on January 1, 2025.

== Historical timeline ==
- 1844 Music was considered a discipline worthy of recognition by the University of Toronto (named King's College until 1850) and examinations were held for candidates wishing to receive a degree in music.
- 1846 James Paton Clarke became the first person in Canada to be awarded the degree of Bachelor of Music.
- 1858 George Strathy received Canada's first D Mus at Trinity College.
- 1886 The Toronto Conservatory of Music was incorporated, and was operated in conjunction with the University of Toronto from its beginnings.
- 1904 Trinity College was relieved of the music degree, and the MusBac became a University of Toronto degree.
- 1918 The Faculty of Music was established. The Senate of the university withdrew its affiliations with various music schools (Toronto College of Music and Royal Hamilton College of Music) and inaugurated a Faculty of Music to teach music and administer examinations. Along with his duties as music director of the Toronto Conservatory, Augustus Stephen Vogt was appointed dean.
- 1921 The Ontario Legislature passed Bill 154, an act that vested the assets of the Toronto Conservatory of Music in the University of Toronto.
- 1926 Sir Ernest MacMillan became dean of the Faculty of Music and principal of the Toronto Conservatory of Music.
- 1934 "Courses of Instruction" were introduced, the first courses to be taught at the Faculty.
- 1945 Ettore Mazzoleni became principal of the conservatory. Edward Johnson was appointed to the Board of Governors of the university and the Conservatory.
- 1946 Arnold Walter established and was appointed director of the Senior School for advanced students at the Conservatory. He also established the three-year Artist Diploma program and the Opera School.
- 1947 The Toronto Conservatory of Music received the Royal charter from King George VI, and became The Royal Conservatory of Music.
- 1952–1953 A new administrative structure was created – The Royal Conservatory of Music at the University of Toronto placed a dean in charge of all music programs. There would be one dean in charge of two divisions: The School of Music (the previous Royal Conservatory of Music) headed by a principal (Ettore Mazzoleni) and the Faculty of Music, headed by a director (Arnold Walter). The School of Music ran the opera school, examinations of grade 1 to ARCT, and the speech arts department. The Faculty of Music ran the Licentiate and Artist diploma courses, and the Senior School no longer existed. Boyd Neel was appointed dean of the 'umbrella' RCMT.
- 1954 The first program for the Master of Music was introduced.
- 1958–1959 The university's President's Report announced that the Faculty of Music would have a new building and the School of Music would move to McMaster Hall on Bloor Street.
- 1959 Plans for an electronic music studio were announced, historically the second in a North American university.
- 1961–1962 The MusBac became a four-year program.
- 1962 The Faculty of Music moved to the newly built Edward Johnson Building (the first building in Canada designed specifically for professional music study), though the official opening was delayed until spring 1964, and the School of Music moved to McMaster Hall.
- 1966–1967 The first Bachelor of Music in Performance was offered.
- 1969 The Opera School transferred to the Faculty of Music and a two-year opera diploma program was approved.
- 1969–1970 A new curriculum was put into place – ‘basic music’ subjects in the first two years were common to all students. The Master of Music in Performance was approved.
- 1970 John Beckwith was appointed dean. The post of director of the Faculty of Music was eliminated. The faculty became responsibility of the dean, and the School of Music was renamed to its more popular name, the Royal Conservatory of Music.
- 1973–1974 This was the last year Conservatory performance certificates were accepted as alternatives for admission to the Faculty of Music. All incoming students were subsequently auditioned and interviewed.
- 1977 Gustav Ciamaga appointed dean
- 1978–1979 Theory and Conducting majors were added to the undergraduate curriculum. The conducting major was discontinued in 1986.
- 1979–1980 The first jazz courses were offered.
- 1983–1984 The university created the Committee on the Future of Music Studies to review how the faculty and conservatory were operated and organized. In 1984, its final report recommended the eventual separation of the Conservatory from the university.
- 1984 Carl Morey appointed dean.
- 1990 Paul Pedersen appointed dean.
- 1991 The Royal Conservatory of Music Act of the Ontario Legislature confirms the separation of the Conservatory from the University of Toronto and re-established The Royal Conservatory's status as a fully independent, not-for-profit entity. The MusBac in Jazz Performance is introduced.
- 1996 David Beach appointed dean.
- 2004 Gage Averill appointed dean.
- 2007 Russell Hartenberger was appointed Interim dean and named dean in 2008.
- 2007 Concurrent Teacher's Education Program established, as well as the Doctorate in Musical Arts (DMA) in Performance.
- 2011 Don McLean appointed dean.
- 2021 Ellie Hisama appointed dean.
- 2023 Ryan McClelland appointed acting dean.
- 2025 Ryan McClelland appointed interim dean.
- 2026 Ryan McClelland appointed dean.

== Research and collaborations ==
=== Research institutes ===
The Music and Health Research Collaboratory (MaHRC), established in 2012, is a collaborative group of researchers that aims to better understand the role of sound in human experiences, exploring connections of sound to the human experience of health.

The Institute for Canadian Music, established in 1984, aims to promote and support all areas of Canadian Music Study.

=== Artists in residence ===
- Canadian Brass – Distinguished Ensemble in Residence 2011–2015
- Cecilia String Quartet – Ensemble in Residence
- Gryphon Trio – Artists in Residence
- Nexus – Resident Percussion Ensemble
- Tafelmusik – Baroque Orchestra in Residence
- Young Voices Toronto (formerly High Park Choirs of Toronto) – Children's Choir in Residence
- St. Lawrence String Quartet – Visiting Chamber Ensemble

== St. George campus facilities ==
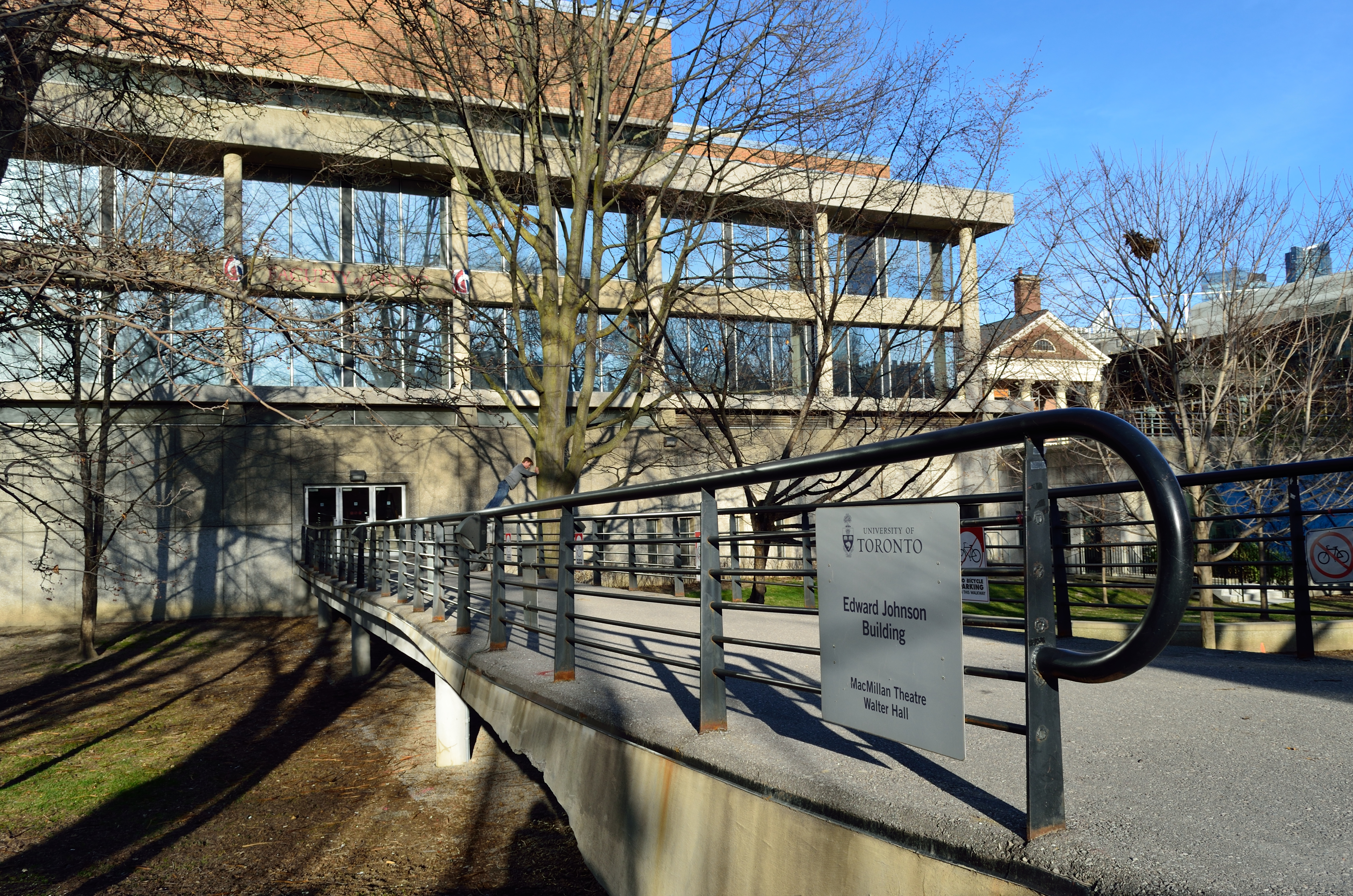
Edward Johnson Building

Edward Johnson Building – Home of the Faculty of Music since 1962, the Edward Johnson Building houses many offices and classrooms, as well as two floors of practice rooms, two large rehearsal rooms, the Faculty of Music Library, the University of Toronto Electronic Music Studio (UTEMS), a theatre for large ensemble performances (MacMillan Theatre) and a smaller recital hall (Walter Hall), and named for the Guelph-born operatic tenor, former board chair of the Royal Conservatory of Music, and General Manager of the Metropolitan Opera (1935–1950), Edward Johnson.

MacMillan Theatre – This 815-seat hall was designed for the production of operas and large ensemble concerts and named after former dean, Sir Ernest MacMillan. World-renowned for its excellent acoustics.

Walter Hall – Commemorating Arnold Walter, director of thefaculty from 1952 to 1968, Walter Hall was designed for chamber concerts and recitals. The house seats 490. The hall also contains a two-manual tracker-action Casavant organ.

Library – A part of the University of Toronto Library System, it is the largest music research collection in Canada. It contains over 300,000 printed materials, 180,000 recordings in the Sniderman Recordings Archive, 2,500 volumes in the Olnick Rare Book Room, and 3,500 titles in the Performance Collection.

Electroacoustic Studio – The University of Toronto Electronic Music Studio opened in 1959. Originally located in a house on Division Street, it was moved to the Edward Johnson Building in 1963.

== Degrees and programs ==
=== Undergraduate studies ===
==== Bachelor of Music in Performance (four-year program) ====
In the classical stream, major instruments include those in the woodwind, brass and strings families, as well as percussion, piano, voice, guitar, harp, organ, accordion and historical instruments. In the jazz program, major instruments include double bass, guitar, drums, piano, trumpet, trombone, saxophone and voice.

==== Bachelor of Music (four-year program) ====
Options for major include: Interdisciplinary Studies, Composition, History and Theory, Music Education, and Concurrent Teacher Education (five-year program in partnership with OISE).

==== Advanced Certificate in Performance (one-year program) ====
This is a one-year program of intensive full-time study, open to woodwinds, brass, percussion, strings, piano, voice and accordion. Students enrolling in this program have the option of specializing in Baroque music, utilizing period instruments in conjunction with Tafelmusik.

==== Artist Diploma (3-year program) ====
The artist diploma program is similar to the Bachelor of Music in Performance, but without academic-subject requirements. This is not open to students with a Bachelor of Music or a Bachelor of Music in Performance from the Faculty of Music.

==== Diploma in Operatic Performance (2- or 3-year program) ====
Three streams are available in this program – one for singers (2 or 3 years), one for operatic repetiteurs (2 years) and one for operatic stage directors (2 years).

=== Graduate studies ===
==== Music performance and composition programs ====
Programs include: MMus in Composition, in Music Technology and Digital Media, in Instrumental (solo piano, woodwinds, brass, percussion, strings), in Collaborative Piano, in Conducting, in Jazz Performance, in Opera, in Piano Pedagogy, in Voice and in Vocal Pedagogy; and DMA in Performance and in Composition.

==== Music program ====
Programs include: MA and PhD in Music Education, Musicology, Theory, Performance and Ethnomusicology.

== Performance Ensembles ==
In addition to large ensembles offered at the Faculty, there are various chamber music courses and collaborative piano courses. Most of these courses involve weekly masterclasses. There are also several world music ensemble courses offered, such as Japanese taiko drumming, African drumming and dancing, Latin-American percussion, Klezmer, tabla, Balinese Gamelan, Korean ensemble and steel pan.

=== Large ensembles ===
- University of Toronto Symphony Orchestra (UTSO) – conducted by Uri Mayer
- University of Toronto Wind Ensemble – conducted by Dr. Gillian MacKay
- University of Toronto Wind Symphony – conducted by Pratik Gandhi
- University of Toronto MacMillan Singers – conducted by Dr. Jamie Hillman
- University of Toronto Soprano/Alto Chorus – conducted by Dr. Elaine Choi
- University of Toronto Women's Chamber Choir – conducted by Dr. Lori Dolloff
- University of Toronto Tenor/Bass Chorus – conducted by Thomas Burton
- University of Toronto Jazz Orchestras – conducted by Jim Lewis
- University of Toronto Vocal Jazz Ensemble – conducted by Christine Duncan
- University of Toronto Guitar Orchestra – conducted by Rob MacDonald
- Contemporary Music Ensemble (gamUT) – directed by Wallace Halladay
- University of Toronto Percussion Ensemble – conducted by Beverley Johnston
- Early Music Ensembles – conducted by Ivars Taurins

== Annual events ==
New Music Festival – Each year, the Faculty of Music hosts the University of Toronto New Music Festival at the end of January. The festival plays host to at least one distinguished guest in composition.

== List of deans ==
- Augustus Stephen Vogt (1918–1927)
- Sir Ernest MacMillan (1927–1952)
- Arnold Walter (director, 1952–1968)
- Boyd Neel (1953–1970)
- John Beckwith (1970–1977)
- Gustav Ciamaga (1977–1984)
- Carl Morey (1984–1990)
- Paul Pedersen (1990–1995)
- Robert Falck (acting, 1995–1996)
- David Beach (1996–2004)
- Gage Averill (2004–2007)
- Russell Hartenberger (2007–2010)
- Don McLean (2011–2021)
- Ellie Hisama (2021–2024)
- Ryan McClelland (acting, 2023–2025; interim, 2025–2026; 2026–present)

== Notable faculty and alumni ==
=== Faculty ===
- Jacques Abram – pianist
- Robert Aitken – composer, flautist
- Michael Patrick Albano – stage director, acting coach, librettist
- Raffi Armenian – conductor, composer, pianist
- John Beckwith – composer, writer, broadcaster, pianist
- Boris Berlin – pianist
- Denis Brott – cellist
- Walter Buczynski – composer, pianist
- Chan Ka Nin – composer
- Andrew Dawes – violinist
- Enrico Elisi – pianist
- Lorand Fenyves – violinist
- Harry Freedman – composer, English hornist
- Hans Gruber – conductor
- Christos Hatzis – composer
- John Hawkins – composer, conductor
- Pierre Hétu – conductor, pianist
- Jamie Hillman – choral conductor
- Derek Holman – choral conductor, organist, composer
- Sandra Horst – pianist, vocal coach, choral conductor
- Jacques Israelievitch – violinist
- Kelly Jefferson – jazz saxophonist
- Richard Johnston – composer
- Norbert Kraft – guitarist
- Antonín Kubálek – pianist
- Gary Kulesha – composer
- Larysa Kuzmenko – composer, pianist
- Ettore Mazzoleni – conductor
- John McKay – pianist
- Albert Pratz – violinist, conductor, composer
- Godfrey Ridout – composer, conductor
- Eugene Rittich – horn
- Shauna Rolston – cellist
- Chase Sanborn – jazz trumpet
- Ezra Schabas
- Leo Smith – composer
- Frédérique Vézina – soprano
- John Weinzweig – composer
- Carol Welsman – jazz vocalist and pianist
- S. Drummond Wolff – organist, choirmaster, composer
- John Wyre – percussionist, composer
- David Zafer – violinist

=== Alumni ===
==== Composers ====
- Kristi Allik
- Wayne Barlow
- John Beckwith
- Norma Beecroft
- Michael Bussiere
- Brian Cherney
- Gustav Ciamaga
- F. R. C. Clarke
- Mychael Danna
- Omar Daniel
- Samuel Dolin
- Clifford Ford
- Srul Irving Glick – composer
- David Grimes
- Kelsey Jones – composer, pianist
- Todor Kobakov – composer, pianist
- Serouj Kradjian – composer, pianist
- Veronika Krausas
- Bruce Mather – composer, pianist
- James Montgomery
- Éric Morin
- Owen Pallett – composer, violinist
- Donald Patriquin – composer, organist, choir conductor
- Paul Pedersen
- Bob Pritchard
- Imant Raminsh – composer, violinist, conductor
- John Rea
- James Rolfe – composer
- Clark Ross – composer, guitarist
- Terry Rusling – electronic composer
- David Squires
- Timothy Sullivan – composer, music educator
- Peter Tahourdin
- Sandy Thorburn – composer, theatre director
- Kevin Turcotte – trumpet player
- John Weinzweig
- Alfred Whitehead – composer, organist, choral conductor
- Charles Wilson – composer, choral conductor
- Chan Wing-wah – conductor, composer

==== Conductors ====
- Nathan Brock – conductor
- Petar Dundjerski – flautist, conductor
- Victor Feldbrill – conductor, violinist
- James Gayfer – bandmaster, clarinettist, composer
- Graham George – composer, organist, choirmaster
- Elmer Iseler – choir conductor
- Brian Jackson – conductor
- Janko Kastelic – conductor
- Julian Kuerti – conductor
- Richard Lee – violinist, conductor
- Leon Major – opera and theatre director
- Evan Mitchell – conductor
- Glenn Price – conductor
- Wayne Strongman – conductor, founding managing artistic director, Tapestry New Opera

==== Instrumentalists ====
- James Campbell – clarinettist
- David Bourque – clarinettist
- Liona Boyd – guitarist
- David Braid – jazz pianist, composer
- Howard Brown – pianist
- Jarred Dunn – pianist
- David J. Elliott – trombonist, professor of music and music education, New York University
- Mark Fewer – violinist; associate professor, Schulich School of Music, McGill University
- Jonathan Freeman-Attwood – trumpet, principal of the Royal Academy of Music in London
- Jeffrey McFadden – guitarist
- Attila Fias – jazz pianist, composer, arranger, recording artist
- Timothy Phelan – guitarist
- Walter Prystawski – violinist
- Erika Raum – violinist
- Yaroslav Senyshyn – pianist; professor, Simon Fraser University
- Peter Elyakim Taussig – pianist, composer
- Fergus McWilliam – horn player, with Berlin Philharmonic
- Carolyn Gadiel Warner – violinist, pianist with the Cleveland Orchestra

==== Musicologists and others ====
- Gregory G. Butler – professor emeritus (musicology), University of British Columbia
- Eric Chafe – Victor and Gwendolyn Beinfield Professor of Music, Brandeis University
- Beverley Diamond – Canada Research Chair in Traditional Music, Ethnomusicology, Professor at Memorial University
- Cliff Eisen – associate editor, New Köchel Catalogue, King's College London
- Jonathan Freeman-Attwood – principal, Royal Academy of Music in London
- Helmut Kallmann – Canadian music historian
- Simon Morrison – professor of music, Princeton
- Paolo Pietropaolo – music journalist and CBC Radio broadcaster
- Alison Pybus – vice-president, Vocal Division, IMG Artists, New York
- Peter Simon – president, Royal Conservatory of Music

==== Vocalists ====
- Russell Braun – baritone
- Measha Brueggergosman – soprano
- Ariana Chris – mezzo-soprano
- Sally Dibblee – soprano
- John Fanning – baritone
- Barbara Fris – soprano
- Barbara Hannigan – soprano
- Rosemarie Landry – soprano
- Ermanno Mauro – tenor
- Mary Morrison – soprano
- Patricia O'Callaghan – soprano
- Mark Pedrotti – baritone
- Adrianne Pieczonka – soprano
- Brett Polegato – baritone
- David Pomeroy – tenor
- Teresa Stratas – soprano
- Jon Vickers – heldentenor
- Emily d'Angelo – mezzo-soprano

== See also ==
- Music of Ontario
- Music of Canada
