= Monica Gaylord =

Canadian pianist

- Born: February 6, 1948 (age 78); St. Albans, Queens, New York, US
- Education: Juilliard School, Eastman School of Music (B.Mus, M.Mus)
- Instrument: Piano
- Member of: The Royal Conservatory of Music
- Formerly of: Toronto Symphony Orchestra, National Arts Centre Orchestra
- Website: rcmusic.com/bios/monica-gaylord

Monica Gaylord (born 1948) is a Caribbean-Canadian pianist, harpsichordist, and teacher.

In 2020, during Black History Month, she was honoured by the Government of Canada alongside Measha Brueggergosman, Oscar Peterson, Portia White, and Eleanor Collins among "notable Black people in Canada who have helped shape Canadian heritage and identity."

== Early life and education ==
Gaylord was born in St. Albans, Queens, in 1948 to Jamaican parents. At the age of 9, she featured as a piano prodigy on The Lawrence Welk Show. The following year, she began her studies at Juilliard with Jane Carlson. Gaylord graduated from Juilliard in 1963, and went on to receive Bachelor of Music (1968) and Master of Music degrees (1969) from Eastman, where she studied with Cécile Genhart.

== Career ==
Gaylord moved to Canada in 1970 to become the orchestral pianist for the Toronto Symphony Orchestra and the National Arts Centre Orchestra (NACO). She also featured as a soloist with the Hamilton Philharmonic, the Victoria Symphony Orchestra, and the Calgary Philharmonic.

Contemporary reviewers noted her keyboard playing for its "blend of power and charm," with Ronald Hambleton describing her musicianship as "endowed with both subtlety and strength and shows admirable calm and warmth." James Montgomery dedicated his 1979 CBC commission I Have Come Through, a composition which "highlights the wide-ranging textural and timbral capabilities of the piano," to Gaylord. Glenn Gould referred to Gaylord as "an artist who combines astonishing versatility with extraordinary insights," and composed Monica—Her Madrigal in her honour.

In March 1978, Gaylord premiered R. Murray Schafer's Adieu Robert Schumann with Maureen Forrester and NACO in Ottawa, proceeding on tour. Later that year, on 5 November, Prime Minister Pierre Trudeau invited Gaylord to play for an assembly of visiting African heads of state, where she was described as "the surprise hit... the PM's personal choice to play the piano... [and] the centre of attention." Gaylord continued to feature at the National Arts Centre, often with Forrester, for major Canadian state visits through the mid-1980s, including a performance for Chinese Premier Zhao Ziyang.

Gaylord also continued to be active in new music, featuring as a soloist with New Music Concerts in Toronto on and their 1977 European tour. She premiered David Keane's Lyra for piano and tape (1978) in January 1979 at the first annual Festival of Electronic Music, hosted by The Music Gallery in Toronto. A recording of that performance was subsequently released on the Music Gallery Editions label (MGE-29). She toured Europe in 1985 with the Canadian Electronic Ensemble (CEE), performing at the Holland Festival. CEE founding member David Jaeger, reflecting on that period in a 2021 interview, named Gaylord as one of a handful of "fabulous performers" that contemporary composers considered as ideal collaborators, describing her playing of his tone poem Quivi sospiro (1979) as "virtuoso."

In 1986, Gaylord joined the faculty of The Royal Conservatory of Music, where she continues to teach, co-authoring the institutions's piano workbooks.

She has been especially active in performing and promoting the work of Black composers and Canadian women composers, remarking that the latter was necessary "because so many are under the impression that there are no women composers in Canada." She premiered Mary Gardiner's Concerto for piano, string orchestra and drum set (1977) at the first concert dedicated to women composers' works in Toronto. With the support of a grant from the National Endowment for the Arts, she recorded Black Piano – A Treasury of Works for Solo Piano by Black Composers, featuring music by William Grant Still, Oscar Peterson, Duke Ellington, Howard Swanson, Robert Nathaniel Dett, Ulysses Kay, John Wesley Work III, and Samuel Coleridge-Taylor. The album was released on Music & Arts' "Programs of America" label (CD 737-1) in 1992, and re-released as Piano Music by William Grant Still and Other Black Composers in 1998.

Writing in The Musical Times, David Wright praised Gaylord's playing on Black Piano as consistently excellent, noting the "striking" quality of her performance of works by Peterson, Ellington, and Coleridge-Taylor in particular.

== In photography ==
Gaylord is the subject of two notable black-and-white photographs by Walter Curtin that are part of the permanent collection of the National Gallery of Canada, taken when Curtin was engaged in "an extensive project documenting Canada's classical music scene" in the 1970s, with a focus on "current pianists" including Gaylord and Angela Hewitt. These photographs are also described and reproduced in Kenneth Winters' 1994 book Curtin Call: A Photographer's Candid View of 25 Years of Music in Canada. The first is a striking image of the performer seated at the piano, wearing a white jacket, white gloves, and a white mask, taken at Walter Hall in 1973. The second is of Gaylord and another pianist, Heléna Bowkun, at work and rest respectively, in rehearsal at the Art Gallery of Ontario for a Canadian Broadcasting Corporation concert performance of James Montgomery's Riverrun, composed for three amplified pianos.

The Toronto Public Library Digital Archive holds three further photographs of Gaylord through the Toronto Star Photograph Archive: two by photographer Boris Spremo, taken in 1977 aboard the MS Jadran, and a portrait by Dick Darrell from 1973.

== Personal life ==
In the late 1970s and early 1980s, Gaylord had a romantic relationship with Pierre Trudeau, then Prime Minister of Canada, that attracted considerable public interest in Canada, making front-page news.
