= David Jaeger =

David Jaeger (born 9 November 1947) is an American born Canadian composer, music producer, radio producer, and performer. An associate of the Canadian Music Centre and a member of the Canadian League of Composers, he is best known for his compositions and performances of electronic music. In 1971 he co-founded the Canadian Electronic Ensemble with whom he has been active as a composer and performer for decades. From 1973 until his retirement in 2013 he was a producer for CBC Radio.

== Life and career ==
Born in Green Bay, Wisconsin, Jaeger was educated at the University of Wisconsin–Madison where he earned a Bachelor of Music in 1970. After being awarded a Woodrow Wilson Fellowship he pursued graduate studies under John Weinzweig and Gustav Ciamaga at the University of Toronto; earning a Master of Music in 1972. During that time he established a digital sound synthesis facility at that university. He then pursued further studies in electronic music with Jon Appleton and Hubert Howe in the Summer Electronic Music Institute at Dartmouth College.

Jaeger is best known for his compositions and performances of electronic music. In 1971 he co-founded the Canadian Electronic Ensemble with David Grimes, Larry Lake and James Montgomery. He has worked as both a performer and composer with that group for decades; releasing multiple recordings in addition to performing in concert tours.

Jaeger worked as a radio producer for the CBC from 1973-2013; during which time he created the programs 'Music of Today and Music Makers International. He won two JUNO Awards for his work producing the Orford String Quartet's 1990 album Schafer: 5.
