= Ben Steinberg =

Canadian composer (1930–2023)

Ben Steinberg (22 January 1930 – 10 February 2023) was a Canadian composer, conductor, organist, and music educator. A member of the Canadian League of Composers and an associate of the Canadian Music Centre, he is known for his contributions to Jewish music. He has presented many programs of Jewish music (some featuring his own compositions) for the Canadian Broadcasting Corporation and has presented similar programs in lecture-recitals throughout Canada, the United States, Australia, and Japan. He has also contributed articles on Jewish music to a number of publications. Several of his original manuscripts and papers are held in the collection at the library of the University of Calgary.

Steinberg was a founding member of the Guild of Temple Musicians, an affiliate of the American Conference of Cantors. The GTM named their most prestigious award for young composers of Jewish music after Steinberg, the Ben Steinberg Young Composer Award. Steinberg was an honorary member of the American Conference of Cantors and a featured composer for Transcontinental Music Publications, the largest and oldest publisher of Jewish music.

Steinberg died on 10 February 2023, at the age of 93.

== Early life ==
Born to Jewish parents in Winnipeg, Steinberg was the son of cantor and conductor Alexander Steinberg. By the age of eight he was singing as a soloist with his father's synagogue choir. He was a pupil of Samuel Dolin (piano), Weldon Kilburn (singing), and John Weinzweig (composition) at The Royal Conservatory of Music from 1948 to 1951 and 1957 to 1960. He also studied music education at the University of Toronto where he earned a Bachelor of Music in 1961.

== Career ==
In 1950 Steinberg was appointed director of the music program at the school at Holy Blossom Temple in Toronto, a position he held until 1960 when he became the temple's music director. He remained in that post until he became music director at Temple Sinai in 1970. From 1953 to 1958 he taught at various public schools in the Toronto area. He became the head of the music department at Winston Churchill Collegiate Institute in 1961. He left there in 1964 to become the head of the music program at Forest Hill Collegiate Institute where he remained until 1986. In 1961 the Union of American Hebrew Congregations commissioned and published his method for youth choirs, Together Do They Sing.

During the 1960s Steinberg composed three sacred services which were published by Transcontinental Music. He later wrote two more services of which one was published in 1990. Transcontinental has also published several of Steinberg's choral, organ, orchestral, and vocal works, including The Vision of Isaiah (1970) for tenor, choir, and organ or instrumental ensemble; Yerushalayim (1973) for soprano, choir, and orchestra; and Echoes of Children (1979), a cantata for soloist, narrator, chorus, and orchestra. The latter composition was awarded the International Gabriel Award and was twice performed on nationally televised broadcasts on PBS in the United States.

In 1978 and 1980 Steinberg was the artist-in-residence for the city of Jerusalem. In 1980 Paul Brodie commissioned his Suite Sephardi and in 1983 his Suite for String Orchestra was commissioned by the Chamber Players of Toronto. In 1983 he won a composition award from the American Harp Society for his Suite for Flute, Viola and Harp (1981) and was awarded the Kavod Award of the Cantors Assembly. In 1989 baritone Richard Allen recorded several of his works on the cassette A Ben Steinberg Concert and in 1990 his Invocations was commissioned by Lawrence Cherney. He was commissioned to write a total of 18 compositions by temples, synagogues, and congregations in the USA between 1980 and 1991.
