= Paul Pedersen (composer) =

Canadian composer (born 1935)

- Born: 28 August 1935 (age 90)
- Education: University of Toronto
- Known for: Electronic music-Electroacoustic music
- Style: Atonal Style

Paul Richard Pedersen (born August 28, 1935) is a Canadian composer, arts administrator, and music educator. An associate of the Canadian Music Centre and a member of the Canadian League of Composers, he is particularly known for his works of electronic music; a number of which utilize various forms of multi-media. In 2014 he was made an Honorary Member of the Canadian Electroacoustic Community. Early on in his career, he wrote non-electronic compositions which exhibited a free atonal style.

== Life ==
Born in Camrose, Alberta, Pedersen entered the University of Saskatchewan in 1953 where he earned a Bachelor of Arts in music in 1957. At the school he was mentored in music composition by Murray Adaskin. He matriculated to the University of Toronto (U of T) where he studied composition with John Weinzweig; receiving a Master of Music in 1961. He later returned to U of T to pursue doctoral studies in musicology which focused on research in acoustic and musical psychology. Part of his research was published in the Winter 1965 edition of the Journal of Music Theory in an article entitled The mel scale. He earned a PhD from U of T in 1970 after completing his doctoral dissertation, The perception of musical pitch structure.

In 1961 Pedersen joined the music staff at Parkdale Collegiate Institute in Toronto. He left there in 1962 when he was appointed music director of Augustana University College, a post he held through 1964. In 1966 he was appointed to the Faculty of Music at McGill University where he remained for the next 24 years. He served as the chairman of McGill's theory department from 1970–1974 and was head of the McGill University Electronic Music Studios from 1971-1974. He served as Associate-Dean of the Faculty of Music from 1974–1976 and then as Dean from 1976-1986. He was also director and executive producer of McGill University Records from 1976-1990. In 1990 Pedersen left McGill to become the dean of the Faculty of Music at University of Toronto. His students included composer Nicole Rodrigue.

In 2016, Concordia University in Montreal created 'The Paul Award in Electroacoustics' to celebrate Paul Pedersen's contribution to the development of electroacoustics in Canada.
