= Larry Lake (musician) =

Canadian trumpet player and composer (1943–2013)

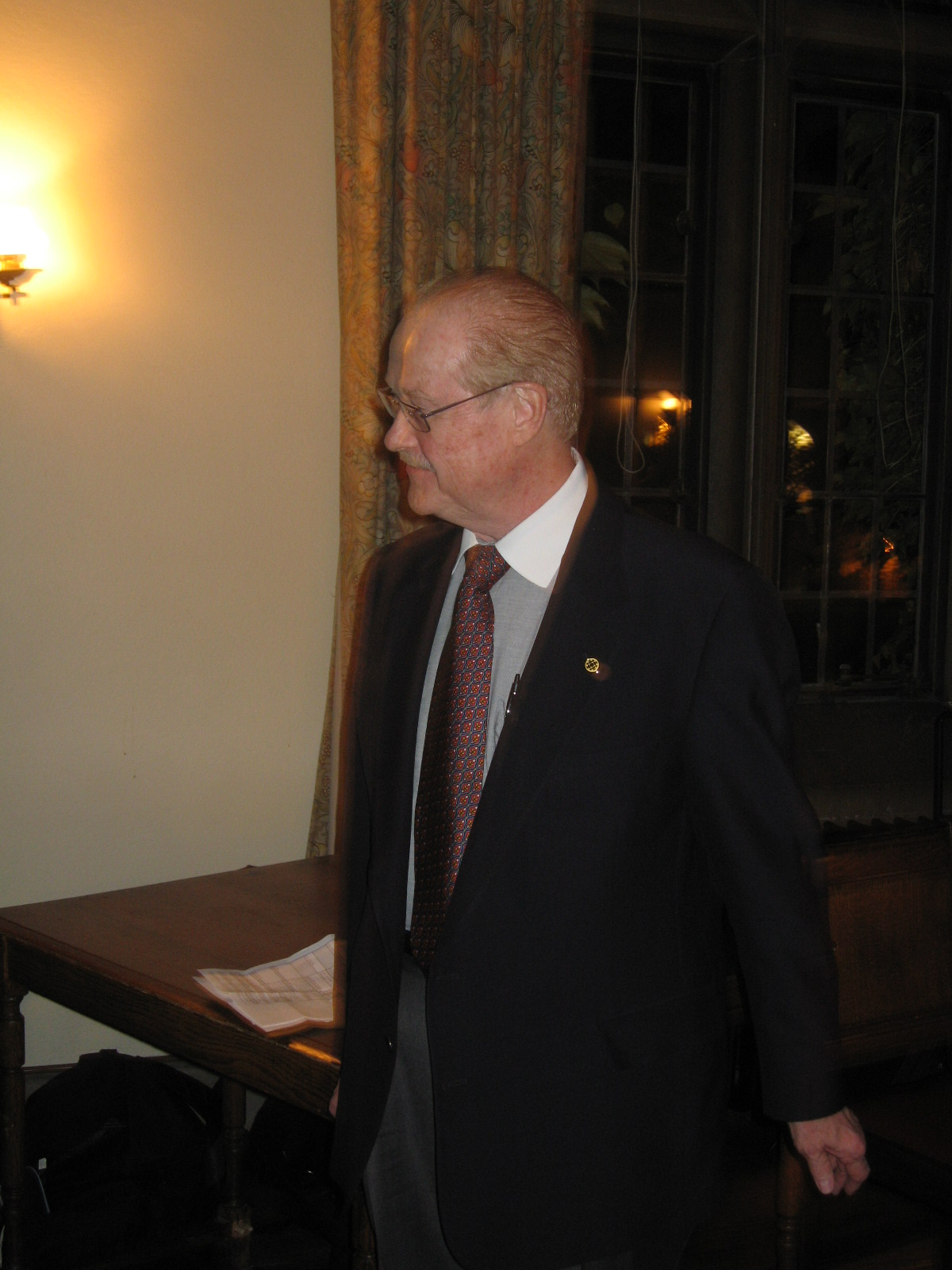
- Lake in 2006

Background information
- Born: Larry Ellsworth Lake; 2 July 1943; Greenville, Pennsylvania
- Died: 17 September 2013 (aged 70)
- Occupations: Composer, musician
- Instrument: Trumpet

Larry Ellsworth Lake (2 July 1943 – 17 September 2013) was an American-born Canadian composer, trumpeter, freelance writer on music, radio broadcaster, and record producer. As a composer, he was primarily known for his electronic music. His musical compositions are characterized by their integration of acoustic instruments with electronic ones in live performance. From 1985 until his death he served as artistic director of the Canadian Electronic Ensemble, a group of which he was a founding member. For nearly 30 years he hosted and served as music consultant for the CBC Radio program Two New Hours. An associate of the Canadian Music Centre (CMC), he was the chair of the CMC's Ontario Region Council and was an executive member of the CMC's national board. He was a member of both the Canadian Electroacoustic Community and the Canadian League of Composers. His compositions received multiple awards from the CMC (1982, 1984, 1987) and from the Major Armstrong Foundation. He received three Juno Award nominations for his work as a record producer.

== Life and career ==
Larry Lake was born on 2 July 1943 to Mennonite parents in Greenville, Pennsylvania. He grew up in Florida and Georgia. In 1960 he entered Florida State University but transferred to the University of Miami (UM) early on in his college education. At the UM he studied trumpet with Harry Glantz, former principal trumpet of the Philadelphia Orchestra. He earned three degrees from the UM: a Bachelor of Music (1964), a Master of Education (1968), and a Master of Music in musicology (1970). In 1968 he studied electronic music at Southern Illinois University with Will Gay Bottje, Lejaren Hiller, Hubert S. Howe Jr, and Robert Moog.

In 1970 Lake moved to Canada to pursue further studies in electronic music with Gustav Ciamaga at the University of Toronto (UT). In 1972 he abandoned his studies at the UT to become a music producer for CBC Radio. He left that position in 1975 but began working as a music consultant and producer for the Canadian Broadcasting Corporation in 1977. The programs he worked on for the CBC included MusicScope, Themes and Variations, Music Alive, and Symphony Hall. In 1978 he became the music consultant for the CBC Radio program Two New Hours, a position he maintained until 2007 and was Two New Hours host from 1995 to 2007. In 2002 he and David Jaeger were honoured with the Friends of Canadian Music Award by the Canadian Music Centre for their work on that program.

In 1971 Lake co-founded the Canadian Electronic Ensemble (CEE) with Jaeger, David Grimes, and James Montgomery, and from 1985 he served as the artistic director of the group. The CEE is the oldest continuously active live-electronic performing group in the world. Lake remained artistic director of the CEE up until his death in 2013.

In addition to his work with the CEE, Lake maintained a career as a concert trumpeter. He performed as a soloist with a variety of musical ensembles, including Arraymusic, L'Association pour la création et la recherche électroacoustique du Québec, Espace Musique, Music Inter Alia, the Orchestre Métropolitain de Montréal, the Ottawa Symphony Orchestra, the Toronto Symphony Orchestra, Vancouver New Music, and the Vancouver Symphony Orchestra. He appeared more than 80 times on CBC Radio and Television as a chamber musician and soloist.

Larry Lake died in 2013 after developing leukemia. He was 70.

== Partial list of works ==
Stage and Multi Media music

- Choros 1971. Tape, colour organ, strobe lights
- 'Tis Pity, opera. 1980. Live-elec. Ms

Chamber music

- No More Blues, 1976. Trb, 2 synthesizer, tape. Ms
- Slowly I Turn, 1982. Va, percussion, 2 synthesizer, vibraphone, elec. Ms
- Sticherarion, 1984. Acc, tape, digital delay lines. Ms

Psalm, 1985. Ob, tape. Ms. Centrediscs CMC-CD-3288

- Three Bagatelles, 1986. Gamelan, synthesizer. Ms. Arjuna AR-001 (Evergreen Club)
- Five Pieces for Eight Synthesizers, 1987
- Israfel, 1987. Fl, 8 synths. Trappist CD-9003/4-ACM 37 (Cram fl)
- Ulalume, 1987. Rec, synthesizer. Ms
- Filar il Tuono, 1988. 14 instr. Ms
- Helices, 1988. Bsn, synthesizer. Ms
- Partita, 1989. Cl, synthesizer. Ms

Electroacoustic music

- Eight Studies for Electronic Tape, 1971. Tape
- Homage, 1979. Tape.
- Sonata No. 2., 1981. Tape.

Vocal music

- The Columbine (1980) text by Jones Very for soprano, columbine, tape
- The Devil in the Desert (1980) a setting of five poems by Steven Crane for soprano, vocoder, 4 synthesizer, and delay line
