= Tālivaldis Ķeniņš =

Canadian composer (1919–2008)

- Born: April 23, 1919; Liepāja, Latvia
- Died: January 21, 2008 (aged 88); Toronto, Canada
- Occupations: Composer, teacher

Tālivaldis Ķeniņš (April 23, 1919 – January 21, 2008) was a Latvian-Canadian composer and teacher. He was forced to emigrate from Latvia when it fell under Soviet occupation after World War II, moving to Canada in 1951. He is credited by Canadian musicologist Paul Rapoport with having introduced many European idioms to Canadian art music. CBC Music described him as a "pioneering Canadian composer" and The Canadian Encyclopedia described him as "one of Canada's most frequently commissioned composers."

== Early life and education ==
Born in Liepāja, Latvia, young "Tali" began playing the piano at age five and wrote his first compositions at eight. His parents held prominent positions in Latvia's cultural and political life.

Ķeniņš' secondary school studies were at the Lycée Champollion in Grenoble, France, but he returned home with the outbreak of World War II. From 1940-44, he studied counterpoint and composition at the Latvian Conservatory under Jāzeps Vītols and Ādolfs Ābele in Riga. Ķeniņš made his way to France in the aftermath of the war, and studied at the Paris Conservatory under Tony Aubin and Olivier Messiaen from 1945-51. He was the recipient of the Périlhou, Gouy d'Arcy and Halphen music prizes. Upon graduating in 1950, he was awarded the Grand Prix Laureate in composition for his Cello Sonata. That same year, he received a scholarship from the UNESCO International Music Council to pursue postgraduate work.

== Career ==
Ķeniņš' Septet was performed in 1950 at the Darmstadt New Music Festival, conducted by Hermann Scherchen; the following year, he moved to Toronto, Canada, where he was named organist and choirmaster of the Latvian congregation of St. Andrew's Lutheran Church.

From 1952-84, he taught at the University of Toronto. Among his students were Tomas Dusatko, Edward Laufer, Walter Kemp, Bruce Mather, Ben McPeek, Arturs Ozoliņš, Imant Raminsh, James Rolfe, and Ronald Bruce Smith. He introduced modern European compositional approaches at a time when Anglocentric models were predominant in English-speaking Canada.

Ķeniņš remained deeply committed to his Latvian heritage. He was a founding member of the Latvian Song Festival in 1953 and cofounded the Toronto Latvian Concert Association in 1959. Latvian texts also figured prominently in his choral and vocal music.

In later years, Ķeniņš was hailed in his homeland. The Order of the Three Stars, Latvia's highest civilian honour, was conferred on him in 1995. He also was made an honorary professor of the Latvian Academy of Music and, in 2005, was a recipient of the Grand Music Award for lifetime achievement. A commemorative stamp of Ķeniņš was released in connection with Latvia's centenary in 2018.

He was active in the Canadian League of Composers, serving as president in 1973-74, and was an associate composer of the Canadian Music Centre, of which he was a founding member.

== Compositional style ==
A prolific composer, Ķeniņš' artistry evolved in an effort to "reconcile the romanticism of his nature and the neoclassicism of a French training." He employed traditional forms and a musical language notable for its lyrical melody, contrapuntal textures, and concertante treatments. Ostinato rhythmic patterns were another hallmark, especially in fast movements. Ķeniņš' stylistic evolution has been described as the ability to sound like a different composer - a rare quality among composers, and a sign of exceptional craft and artistic maturation.

The Ķeniņš portrait in the Canadian Composers Portraits series was released in 2003.

He died in Toronto on January 21, 2008.

Ķeniņš was married (1950) to Valda Dreimane; they had two sons.

== Works ==
Orchestral

- 8 Symphonies, including No. 1 (1959), No. 4 (1972), No. 6 Sinfonia ad Fugam (1978), No. 7 (1980), No. 8 (1986)
- 12 Concertos, including Concerto for Viola and Orchestra (1998), Concerto for Violin and Orchestra and Concerto for 14 Instruments
- Canzona Sonata for solo viola and string orchestra (1986)
- Beatae Voces Tenebrae for symphony orchestra

Chamber music

- Sonata for cello and piano (1950)
- Sonata [No. 1] for violin and piano (1955)
- Sonata No. 2 for violin and piano (1979)
- Sonata for viola and piano (1995)
- Sonata for cello solo (1981)
- Adagio and Fugue for viola, cello and organ (1985)
- Elegy and Rondo for viola and piano (1979)
- Fantasy-Variations on an Eskimo Lullaby for flute and viola (1967–1972)
- Partita Breve for viola and piano (1971)
- 2 piano quartets
- Septet (1951)
- Scherzo Concertante

Piano

- Piano Sonata No. 1 (1961)
- Sonata-Fantaisie (1981)
- Piano Sonata No. 3 (1985)
- Sonata for 2 pianos (1988)

Vocal

- 3 cantatas
- 1 oratorio
