= Jim Hiscott =

Canadian composer (born 1948)

James Michael Hiscott (born 4 December 1948) is a Canadian composer, radio producer and accordionist. An associate of the Canadian Music Centre and a member of the Canadian League of Composers, his compositions are characterized by their strong rhythmic base, standard harmonic language, and merger of world music with contemporary sounds and instrumentation. His 1973 work Planes was premiered by the Winnipeg Symphony Orchestra in 1986, conducted by Kazuhiro Koizumi.

== Life and career ==
Born in St. Catharines, Hiscott began his professional studies in mathematics and physics at Brock University where he earned a Bachelor of Science in 1969. It was while pursuing graduate studies in the sciences at Lancaster University in England in 1970 that he decided to switch his career path to music; although he did earn a Master of Science from the University of Toronto in 1971. He studied at The Royal Conservatory of Music from 1970 to 1976 where he was a pupil of Samuel Dolin in music composition. He also studied music at York University from 1973 to 1976 where he earned a Bachelor of Fine Arts in music in 1976.

In 1977 Hiscott was awarded a composition prize by the Canadian Federation of University Women. That same year he became a music producer for CBC Radio in Toronto, later working in the same capacity for CBC Radio in Edmonton (1979) and Winnipeg (1980–1991). In 1981 he co-founded both the contemporary music society IZ Music and the Manitoba Composers Association, notably serving as the latter organizations first president. Several of his compositions have been given their world premieres in IZ Music concerts, including Red Dawn (1977), Spirit Reel (1982), and Variations on a Theme of Giuseppe Verdi (1983, rev 1985).

== Works ==
- Four pieces for string orchestra (1972)
- Moss growing on ruins (1974)
- Ceremony II (1975)
- Gilgamesh : for solo accordion (1977)
- Rains of Sailendra : for flute, clarinet, violin, cello, percussion and piano (1977)
- Moon and clouds over the Clyde (1979)
- Red dawn : for flute, clarinet, and percussion (1982)
- Altiplano : for brass quintet (two trumpets, horn, tenor and bass trombones) (1989)
- Dancing on wings of fire : for diatonic button accordion (A/D) and orchestra (1991)
- The restless wind : for chamber orchestra (flute, oboe, clarinet, bassoon and strings) (1999)
