= Scott Irvine =

Canadian tubist (born 1953)

- Born: James Scott Irvine; 30 December 1953 (age 71); Toronto, Ontario, Canada
- Occupation(s): Composer, arranger
- Instrument: Tuba

James Scott Irvine (born 30 December 1953) is a Canadian composer, arranger, and tuba player based in Owen Sound, Ontario. An associate of the Canadian Music Centre and a member of the Canadian League of Composers, he has been commissioned to compose works by the Canadian Broadcasting Corporation, the Laidlaw Foundation, and the Ontario Arts Council. His works have been recorded on a number of commercial releases, including CDs by Joan Watson, Jack Grunsky, the Canadian Chamber Ensemble, and the Berlin Philharmonic. Most of his compositions are written for concert band and brass instruments.

== Early life and education ==
Irvine grew up in Toronto, Ontario. He studied tuba with Charles Daellenbach at the University of Toronto. He is a graduate of The Royal Conservatory of Music where he studied music composition with Samuel Dolin.

== Career ==
Irvine was a member of the Hannaford Street Silver Band with whom he performed, composed, and recorded for more than 20 years. He played the tuba music featured on the children's television program The Elephant Show.

Irvine has been the principal tubist for the Canadian Opera Company Orchestra since 1984 and currently holds the same post with the Esprit Orchestra. In 1997, he co-founded True North Brass with whom he has released four CDs, all of which feature some of his own compositions.

In 2002, Irvine performed a joint concert with the Canadian Horn Quartet, billing himself as the Tuba Tyrant. The following year the Canadian Opera Company orchestra premiered his work "The Opera House Fanfare".

Irvine performed as part of the Champagne Symphony Pops Orchestra in the "King of Swing" concert at Roy Thomson Hall in 2006. In 2009 he played the tuba with the New Music Concerts Ensemble in Toronto.

In 2010, an album or recordings from the 1990s, Spoiled Bratland, with Irvine on tuba, was released by Mendelson Joe.

In 2015, Irvine performed with the Canadian National Brass Project as part of the Ottawa Chamberfest. In April 2017, he hosted an edition of the CBC Radio 2 show This is My Music.

== Family life ==
Irvine married musician Joan Thelma Watson (1953–2015), who became the principal horn player of the Canadian Opera Orchestra (COC). They raised two sons together, Max and Joel.
