= Milton Barnes (composer) =

- Born: 16 December 1931; Toronto, Ontario, Canada
- Died: 27 February 2001 (aged 69)
- Genres: Jazz
- Occupations: Composer, conductor, drummer
- Instrument: Drums

Milton Barnes (16 December 1931 – 27 February 2001) was a Canadian composer, conductor, and jazz drummer. An associate of the Canadian Music Centre, his music is noted for its frequent use of Jewish themes, its rejection of the avant garde in favor of tonality, and its blend of classical, jazz, and pop elements. His music has been labeled by some critics as "eclectic fusion". He was commissioned to write works by Robert Aitken, Liona Boyd, Paul Brodie, the Canadian Broadcasting Corporation, Erica Goodman, Joseph Macerollo, the Harbord Bakery, the New Chamber Orchestra of Canada, the Ontario Federation of Symphony Orchestras, John Perrone, and Trio Lyra among others. He remained active as a composer up until his sudden death of a heart attack in 2001. He is the father of singer/songwriter Micah Barnes, cellist Ariel Barnes, and drummer/producer Daniel Barnes.

== Life ==
Born in Toronto, Barnes entered The Royal Conservatory of Music (RCM) in 1952 where he was a pupil of Samuel Dolin (piano), Victor Feldbrill (conducting), Ernst Krenek (composition), Boyd Neel (conducting), Walter Susskind (conducting), and John Weinzweig (composition). He graduated from the RCM in 1955 after which he entered the Vienna Academy of Music where he earned a master's degree in 1961. He also spent summers during the 1950s studying at the Chigiana School in Siena, Italy and the Tanglewood Music Center in Lenox, Massachusetts.

During the 1960s and 1970s, Barnes was highly active as a conductor in North America, both as a guest conductor and in staff positions. He notably founded the Toronto Repertory Ensemble (TRE) in 1964, a group which commissioned and performed contemporary Canadian music under his leadership through 1973. A number of the TRE's concerts were broadcast on CBC Radio and Television. From 1961 to 1963 he conducted and composed music for the Crest Theatre in Toronto. In 1964 he was appointed principal conductor of the St Catharines Symphony Orchestra and Chorus (now the Niagara Symphony Orchestra), a post he held until 1972. At the same time he served as conductor of the Philharmonic Orchestra and Chorus of Niagara Falls, New York from 1965 to 1973. He also conducted and composed music for the Toronto Dance Theatre from 1968 to 1973 and periodically did similar work for the St. Lawrence Centre for the Arts during the 1960s and 1970s.

In 1973 Barnes abandoned his work as a conductor in favor of putting his full concentration towards composition. From here on he only conducted performances of his own works, notably doing so for three broadcasts on the CBC Radio program Morningside and for several film and television scoress for the CBC. His 1975 cantata Shir Hashirim was premiered under his baton in July 1999 in Toronto. His last complete composition, Songs of Arrival, premiered at the Historic Old Toronto Summer Music Festival 2000.
