= Doreen Hall =

Background information
- Born: Doreen Foy; 24 May 1921; Warrenpoint, County Down, Northern Ireland
- Died: 19 January 2025 (aged 103) Toronto, Canada
- Instrument: Violin

Doreen Hall (née Foy; 24 May 1921 – 19 January 2025) was a Canadian violinist and music educator.

== Biography ==
Hall grew up in Listowel, near Kitchener, Ontario. She was one of four daughters and she received her first violin lessons from her father, continued them at the Ontario Conservatoire with Elie Spivak, and taught violin at Alma College in St. Thomas, Ontario, from 1942 to 1945. From 1951 to 1952, she headed the string department at Mount Allison University. In addition, she performed as a violinist in concerts and CBC Radio productions during the 1940s.

From 1951 to 1954, she continued her studies at the Toronto Conservatoire and in 1954–55 studied in Salzburg with Carl Orff and Gunild Keetman. After returning to Canada, she introduced the Orff-Schulwerk at the Toronto Conservatoire. She also played violin in the Hart House Orchestra from 1955 to 1956. From 1956, she taught elementary music education at the University of Toronto and in 1957 initiated the summer courses "Music for Children – Carl Orff". In 1962, she taught at the Mozarteum in Salzburg, and subsequently gave courses for music educators at major universities in North America.

With Arnold Walter, Hall produced the five-volume publication "Music for Children - Carl Orff", the first English-language adaptation of Orff and Keetman's music for children. In 1965, she was a consultant for the CDB's three-part school radio series "Living through Music", which won the Ohio State Award in 1966. At Expo 67, she presented "Music for Children" with students from St. George's School in Toronto. That same year, she hosted the CBC radio series "Music of Today - Music in Education".

In 1974, Hall founded the Orff-Schulwerk Society of Canada (later Music for Children – Carl Orff, Canada – Musique pour Enfants), of which she later became honorary patron. From 1975 to 1978, she was editor of the biennial newsletter Music for Children/Carl Orff Canada/Musique pour enfants (continued as Ostinato from 1982). In 1977, she received the Merit Award of the American Orff-Schulwerk Association . In 1986, she retired as Professor Emerita from the University of Toronto.

In 1989, Hall received the Canadian Music Council Medal, in 1990 the Carl-Orff-Stiftung Pro Merito Medal, and in 2002 the Distinguished Service Award from the Music Education Department of the University of Toronto. In February 2008, she was made a Member of the Order of Canada. A committee of the American Orff-Schulwerk Association and Carl Orff Canada awarded her the North American Alliance Award of Recognition in 2009. On 19 January 2025, Hall died aged 103.

== Writings ==
- With Arnold Walter: Music for Children - Carl Orff, 1956–61
- "Music for Children" Orff-Schulwerk Teachers' Manual , 1960
- Nursery Rhymes and Songs , 1961
- Singing Games and Songs , 1963
- Canons and Rounds , 1981
