= Walter Buczynski =

Canadian musician

- Born: 17 December 1933 (age 92); Toronto, Ontario, Canada
- Genres: Contemporary classical music
- Occupations: Composer, teacher, pianist

Walter Joseph Buczynski (born 17 December 1933) is a Canadian composer, teacher, and pianist.

His compositional oeuvre of over 240 works includes music for solo and duo instruments, chamber ensemble, orchestra and band, choral and vocal pieces, and children's and chamber operas. The piano figures prominently with 35 sonatas written from 1967-2019. He also has written 24 lyrics for solo instrument (or voice) and ensemble.

== Biography ==
Born in Toronto, Buczynski earned an Associate diploma from the Royal Conservatory of Music in 1951 and a Licentiate in 1953. While there he studied music composition with Godfrey Ridout and piano with Earle Moss. He studied under Darius Milhaud and Charles Jones at the Aspen Music Festival and School in 1955. He pursued further studies in piano with Rosina Lhévinne in New York in 1958–1959. He received grants from the Polish government that enabled him to study with Zbigniew Drzewiecki in Warsaw in 1959 and 1961. Likewise, grants from the Canada Council made it possible for him to study under Nadia Boulanger in Paris in 1960 and 1962.

In 1951 and 1952 Buczynski was awarded second prizes at the Composers, Authors and Publishers Association of Canada composition competition, going on to win first prize there in 1954 with his Piano Trio. In 1955 he won the Fromm Foundation Award with his Suite for Woodwind Quintet. That same year he made his debut as a concert pianist with the Toronto Symphony Orchestra playing Chopin's F minor Concerto.

Buczynski went on to have an active concert career during the 1960s and early 1970s, giving recitals in major concert venues throughout Canada and in New York, Paris, and Warsaw. His concerts often featured his own work and pieces by other contemporary Canadian composers in addition to traditional repertoire. He appeared on CBC Radio and made a number of solo recordings. He later curtailed his performance schedule to focus on teaching and compositional work.

In 1962 Buczynski joined the piano and music theory faculty at the Royal Conservatory of Music. He left in 1969 to join the faculty of the University of Toronto, where he taught piano and composition until his retirement in 1999. Among his notable pupils were John Burge, Mychael Danna, and Timothy Sullivan. Buczynski served as president of the Canadian League of Composers in 1974–1975 and is an associate of the Canadian Music Centre. He is the recipient of honours including the Queen Elizabeth II Silver Jubilee Medal (1977) and the Gloria Artis Medal (2008) from the Polish government.
