= Marjan Mozetich =

Canadian composer (born 1948)

Marjan Mozetich (born 1948) is a Canadian composer who has written music for theatre, film and dance, as well as symphonic works, chamber music, and solo pieces. He has written compulsory competition pieces for the 1992 Banff String Quartet Competition (Lament in the Trampled Garden) and the 1995 Montreal International Music Competition (L’esprit Chantant for violin and piano). Co-founder of Arraymusic in Toronto, Mozetich served as their artistic director from 1976 to 1978. After his work with Array, he worked for some time at the University of Toronto music library, and then became a freelance composer. Mozetich moved to Howe Island, near Kingston, Ontario, and taught composition at Queen's University in Kingston from 1991 to 2010. He has won several awards, including the first prize in the CAPAC (SOCAN)-Sir Ernest MacMillan Award. His major compositions include Fantasia... sul linguaggio perduto and Postcards from the Sky.

== Biography ==
=== Early life ===
Born in Gorizia, Italy, to Slovenian parents, Mozetich moved to Hamilton, Ontario in 1952, where his father found work as a machinist. Mozetich discovered classical music on CBC Radio, which inspired him to compose romantic music through listening to Chopin, Tchaikovsky, and Rachmaninoff. He also first heard on the radio what was then considered "super-modern pieces", which presented him with a totally different, almost science-fiction perspective. He then started improvising some of his own "super-modern pieces" rather than practicing the classics. At this point, he had not yet learned how to record his compositions.

After graduating from high school Mozetich worked towards becoming a concert pianist, but gave up after he failed his A.R.C.T. He attended the University of Waterloo to study psychology, which he eventually abandoned. He began his musical training by studying piano with Reginald Bedford, and later studied composition with Lothar Klein and John Weinzweig at the University of Toronto, from which he received an Associate of the Royal Conservatory of Toronto (A.R.C.T.) Diploma in 1971 and a Bachelor of Music degree in 1972 in composition and piano. With the help of the Canada Council, he then continued his musical studies in composition privately in Rome, Siena and London with Luciano Berio, Franco Donatoni, and David Bedford.

== Composer ==
=== Early career ===
Mozetich became active in the avant-garde music circles. He co-founded Arraymusic with John Fodi, Clifford Ford, Gary Hayes, Michael Parker, Alex Pauk and Robert Bauer, and served as artistic director. The group's first public concert was performed in 1972. He received a fellowship from the Istituto musicale F. Canneti in 1974 to attend a seminar in Vicenza, Italy.

=== Since the 1980s ===
Mozetich developed a style of post-modern romantic music, which consists of a blend of the traditional, the popular, and the modern. Many of his compositions have been recorded on the CBC-Musica Viva, Centredisc, BIS (Sweden), Cansona, and Chandos (England). His works have been heard throughout Canada and abroad. They have been performed, broadcast, and some have been included in Canadian Airline's 'in flight' music programs.

Some of his music has been used by contemporary dance companies, as well as in film. He was the honoured composer of postmodern music at the Gent Conservatory Music Festival in Belgium in 1995, at which three concerts with live national broadcast featured his compositions.

=== Works 1990s to 2004 ===
Since the 1990s, Mozetich's works have continued to demonstrate a taste for lyricism, romantic harmonies, and moto perpetuo rhythms. His works that explore the spiritual have introspective and meditative qualities; these can be heard in his earlier pieces such as El Dorado.

These works include:

- A Dance Toward Heaven (1994) for orchestra
- L’esprit Chantant (1995) for violin and piano, written for the Montreal International Music Competition
- The passion of Angels (1995) for two harps and orchestra
- Postcards from the Sky (1996), a three-movement work for string orchestra written for and premiered by the Thirteen Strings of Ottawa
- Time to Leave (1997) for violin, clarinet, trumpet, bass, marimba and piano, written for Array's 25th anniversary concert
- Hymn of Ascension (1998) for harmonium and string quartet, premiered at the Ottawa Chamber Music Festival
- Songline to Heaven and a Dance to Earth (1999) for string orchestra, premiered at the Guelph Spring Festival
- Steps to Ecstasy (2001) for baroque orchestra, commissioned by the CBC and premiered by Tafelmusik
- At the Temple (2001) for solo piano, also commissioned by the CBC, and premiered by Kristina Szutor at Sound Symposium 2002

This period's concerted works include:

- Concerto for Bassoon
- Strings and Marimba (2003), premiered by Michael Sweeney and the Seiler Strings
- Concerto for Piano and Orchestra (1999), written in honour of author Robertson Davies and premiered by pianist Janina Fialkowska in February 2000
- Affairs of the Heart, a concerto for violin and orchestra premiered by violinist Juliette Kang in 1997
- Concerto for Oboe and Strings (1995), commissioned by the CBC and premiered by Suzanne Lemieux and the Thirteen Strings of Ottawa

Works for solo instruments include:

- Baroque Diversion (1985), a suite in four movements, and Mozetich's third work for solo viola, commissioned by Rivka Golani
- Five Pieces for Guitar (1997), written for Paul Bernard and recorded by William Beauvais on A Bridge Beyond

=== Later works ===
Mozetich experimented with a return to tonality, combining traditional elements to create a form of ‘post-modernism’, or new age romanticism. An example of this is his composition El Dorado (1981), a mixture of minimalistic Gatling gun rhythms, lyrical melodies, sensuous scoring, and late-romantic textbook harmonies.

Mozetich's music during this period used only three or four chords, often in a cycling progression reminiscent of pop music, but a little more warped or extended, using fullness of sound, melodies, and rhythms to lull the listener. His compositions sometimes included dark passages as an emotional counterbalance. Dance of the Blind is one example of this; Mozetich freely combines the elements of popular, classical and other aspects of music.

==== Dance of the Blind ====
This piece, with the feel of a Parisian tavern jig, is one of Mozetich's own favourites. It was composed for accordion, violin, viola, and cello, and was commissioned by the Canadian Broadcasting Corporation in 1980. It was premiered by the Canadian-Slovenian accordionist, Joseph Petric, and the Arraymusic Ensemble on 16 January 1981. It was later recorded by CBC records in 1990.

Blending the sound of the accordion and strings with consistent high-energy pulsation and repetitions, this piece is written in a ¾ waltz tempo, which is typical of the music for the dance-hall or cabaret. It also employs traditional harmonies and melodies. It reflects the composer's musical heritage, as well as on the Italo-Slovene weddings and banquets of his childhood.

=== Compositional style ===
Mozetich compositional style, which often consists of adapting an existing genre with his own expressions, first appeared in his work Changes for string quartet (1971, revised 1983), which demonstrates the earlier influence on Mozetich of György Ligeti and Krzysztof Penderecki.

Other early works displaying this process include Serenata del nostro tempo (string quintet, 1973) premiered by the Forun Players of Rome, solo pieces for piano (Maya, 1973) and viola (Disturbances, 1974), as well as various chamber works premiered by Arraymusic.

From 1976 to 1981, his style shifted toward a lyrical minimalism with strong harmonic definition, as demonstrated in works like Procession for chamber ensemble (1981) and El Dorado for harp and strings (1981). After 1981 his music became diatonic and post-romantic. This transition can be heard in pieces such as Fantasia ... sul un linguaggio perduto for flute, violin, viola, and cello (1981, later arranged for string orchestra 1985), Sonata for flute and harp (1983), and Death and the Morning Star for baritone, choir, and orchestra (1986).

== Awards and recognition ==
- Mozetich's string quartet, Changes (1971), was performed by the Orford String Quartet and selected as one of the two most outstanding works at the 1971 Composers Symposium in Montreal.
- In 1977, he won CAPAC’S Sir Ernest MacMillan Award/Fellowship. He was the featured composer on postmodern music at the Ghent Conservatory Music Festival in Belgium.
- Nocturne for string orchestra (1975) was chosen to represent Canada at the adjudication for the 1978 International Society for Contemporary Music Festival in Helsinki.
- He won second prize at the International Gaudeamus Competition in Bilthoven, the Netherlands, for his wind quintet It’s in the Air (1975).
- In 2002 he was invited to be composer-in-residence at the Regina Symphony New Music Festival.
- He was nominated for Juno awards for three of his works for Classical Composition of the Year: Affairs of the Heart in 2001, Angels in Flight and, winning the award, Lament in the Trampled Garden in 2010.

== Selected works ==
- Disturbances for Viola Solo (1974)
- A Veiled Dream for Flute, Viola and Harp (1977)
- Survival for Viola Solo (1979)
- Water Music for Flute, Viola and Cello (1979)
- Dancing Strings, Suite of Six Pieces for Viola and Piano (1980)
- El Dorado for Harp and Strings (1981)
- Fantasia... sul linguaggio perduto for Flute and String Trio (1981)
- Trio in Jest for Clarinet, Viola and Piano (1983)
- Baroque Diversions for Viola Solo (1985)
- The Passion of Angels, Concerto for Two Harps and Orchestra (1995)
- Affairs of the Heart Concerto for Violin and String Orchestra (1997)
- Postcards from the Sky for String Orchestra (1997)
- Goodbye My Friend, Triptych for Flute, Viola and Harp (2000)
- Concerto for Bassoon, Marimba and String Orchestra (2003)
- Scales of Joy and Sorrow for Cello, Violin, and Piano (2007)

== Sources ==
- Canadian Music Centre
- Influences of Many Musics
- MacMillan, Rick. "Mozetich not afraid of "popular" tag"
