= Timothy Sullivan (composer) =

Canadian composer, pianist, and music educator

Timothy Richard Sullivan is a Canadian composer, pianist, and music educator. A member of the Canadian League of Composers and an associate of the Canadian Music Centre, he has been commissioned to write works for ARRAYMUSIC, Donald Bell, and the Stratford Festival among others. He is particularly known for his operas and was notably composer-in-residence at the Canadian Opera Company in 1987–1988. His composition are noted for their use of various media and incorporation of several musical idioms, including jazz, chance music, traditional harmony, and serialism.

== Life and career ==
Born in Ottawa, Ontario, Sullivan began studying the piano at the age of 15 and at the age of 20 moved to Toronto to pursue studies in music composition with Samuel Dolin. In 1975 he entered the University of Toronto where he was a pupil of Walter Buczynski and John Beckwith. From the university he earned a Bachelor of Music in 1979, a Master of Music in 1980 and a Doctor of Music in 1999.

In 1979 Sullivan joined the faculty at The Royal Conservatory of Music (RCMT) where he taught for the next decade. He notably was director of the RCMT's composition program from 1985–1989 and in 1986 founded the school's Contemporary Music Ensemble. In 1989–1990 he taught music composition at the University of Victoria.

Kyla Greenbaum (married name Crowcroft) recorded Sullivan's Piano Sonata No 1 in 1977 in Toronto. But he first obtained wide notice for his opera Tomorrow and Tomorrow, a monodrama for soprano, chamber ensemble, and tape. The work successfully premiered by the Center for Contemporary Opera in New York City on 28 March 1987 and was subsequently broadcast on CBC Television on 19 February 1989 in a performance starring Iraina Neufeld. His second opera Dream Play was also highly praised at its premiered on 11 May 1988 in Toronto in a performance by the Canadian Opera Company. His opera Florence premiered at the Elora Festival in 1992.

From 1992 to 2005, Sullivan composed extensively for dance, including modern dance, ballet and Bharatanatyam. Notable choreographer-collaborators were William Douglas (Apollon, La Zone d'Or); John Alleyne (The Archeology of Karl, In the Course of Sleeping and Adrian, Angel on Earth); Menaka Thakkar (Untitled, Land of Cards); and Lata Pada (Cosmos, Revealed by Fire.)

Currently, he is a music educator at Earl Haig Secondary School, Toronto, Ontario.
