= Edward Laufer =

Canadian music theorist, composer and teacher (1938–2014)

Edward Constantin Laufer (25 November 1938 – 7 May 2014) was a Canadian music theorist, composer and teacher.

Laufer was born in Zürich. His family emigrated to Canada in 1939, settling in Halifax. (He became a naturalized citizen in 1953.) Laufer obtained his bachelor of music degree from the University of Toronto in 1957 and his Masters of Music degree from the same institution in 1960. He studied composition with John Weinzweig, John Beckwith, Oskar Morawetz, and Tālivaldis Ķeniņš. Some time after 1960 he temporarily settled in the New York area, attending the Juilliard School where he studied piano with Eduard Steuermann and composition with Vincent Persichetti. At Princeton University, he studied composition with Milton Babbitt, Earl Kim, and Roger Sessions. While in the New York area, he studied Schenkerian analysis privately with Ernst Oster. Laufer obtained a Masters of Fine Arts from Princeton University in 1964.

Before returning to Canada, he taught at Smith College from 1969 to 1971, the State University of New York at Purchase from 1972 to 1974, and the Mannes College of Music from 1973 to 1974. Moving back to Toronto, he was composer-in-residence from 1974 to 1975 at the University of Toronto, and then became a member of its Faculty of Music.

He gave lectures in Canada, the United States, Finland, and England. He published articles in Perspectives of New Music, Journal of Music Theory, Music Theory Spectrum, and Intégral.
