= John Fodi =

John Fodi (22 March 1944 – 2 November 2009) was a composer and music librarian. Born in Hungary, he became a naturalized Canadian citizen in 1961. An associate of the Canadian Music Centre, he was a founding member of ARRAYMUSIC, an organization which premiered several of his compositions.

== Life ==
Born in Nagytevel, John Fodi moved to Canada with his family in 1951 at the age of 7. His father played both the accordion and concertina and John began performing music at an early age; but it was at the public library in Hamilton, Ontario, that he discovered the resources to develop his understanding of music. Finding the accordion increasingly unsatisfactory as a means of exploring classical music he decided to learn to play the piano. This was the instrument which he would use for both the study and composition of music throughout his life. During this period he composed over 40 pieces which reflected the progress of his studies, in particular his fascination with the music of the baroque period.

In 1964, while working as a laboratory technician for Firestone, he began studying music privately with Lorne Betts in the city of Hamilton, Ontario. It was Betts who encouraged and mentored John in the study of contemporary music. In 1966 he entered the music program at the University of Toronto (U of T) where he earned a Bachelor of Music in 1970 and a Master of Music in 1972. At U of T he founded the Contemporary Music Group in 1967, directing the organization through 1970. During this period he was the recipient of numerous awards including the Canadian League of Composers prize (1968, 1970,) the CAPAC St Clair Lowe Award (1970) and a Woodrow Wilson Fellowship (1970). Among his teachers at the U of T were John Beckwith (music composition), Gustav Ciamaga(electronic music), and John Weinzweig (composition). He also pursued studies in composition at McGill University (MU) with István Anhalt in 1970–1971; during which time he and Mickey Cohen co-founded the New Music Society at MU.

In 1973 he participated in the Composers Conference at Johnson State College, Vermont, and the Gaudeamus Music Week in the Netherlands. That same year he represented Canada at the ISCM in Iceland. In 1976 John submitted his string quartet, Concerto a Quattro, directly to the ISCM and it was chosen by the organization for performance in Boston, Massachusetts. From 1972 to 1974 he augmented his income as a composer by working as a copyist for other composers, several publishers, and the Canadian Music Centre. He would continue working as a copyist into the 1990s. In 1973 and 1974 he also taught composition as an "artist in the classroom" through the Ontario Arts Council's "Creative Artists in Schools" programme. In 1974 John began working at the Edward Johnson Music Library, University of Toronto, as a library technician. He became a recordings cataloguer and, in 1982, supervisor of the recordings section. In 1990 he earned a Master of Library Science from the University of Toronto.
