= James Montgomery (composer) =

Canadian music composer, performer and arts administrator

James Louis Montgomery (born 6 February 1943) is a Canadian music composer, performer, and arts administrator. For about 20 years he was the artistic director of The Music Gallery. He is also a founding member of the Canadian Electronic Ensemble with whom he performs and records. As a composer he is known for incorporating electronic technology into his works.

== Early life and education ==
Born in Ravenna, Ontario, Montgomery earned a Bachelor of Music degree in 1966 from Baldwin–Wallace Conservatory of Music. He pursued further studies at Northwestern University with John Weinzweig and at the University of Toronto (U of T) with Gustav Ciamaga. He earned a Master of Music degree from U of T in 1972.

== Career ==
In 1990 Montgomery taught in the Faculty of Education at U of T as a professor of electronic media.

In 1971 Montgomery co-founded the Canadian Electronic Ensemble (CEE) with David Jaeger, David Grimes, and Larry Lake. He has performed and recorded with the CEE since then, and served as the group's managing director from 1976 to 1983. The CEE is currently the oldest continuously active live-electronic performing group in the world. In 1984 they performed at the International Society for Contemporary Music's World Music Days Festival. In 1986 the CEE joined the Toronto Symphony Orchestra to perform the world premiere of Steven Gellman's Universe Symphony. The ensemble has appeared in concerts with the Orchestre Métropolitain de Montréal, the Ottawa Symphony Orchestra, and the Vancouver Symphony Orchestra. Since 1974 the CEE has presented an annual concert series in Toronto. They have given regular international tours since 1975.

In 1984 Montgomery became the administrative director of New Music Concerts. He remained in that position until 1987 when he was appointed artistic director of The Music Gallery.

In 1988 Montgomery created the musical score for the educational short film Sorting Out Sorting.
