= Walter Prystawski =

- Born: 1933 (age 92–93); Toronto, Ontario
- Genre: Classical
- Occupation: Teacher
- Instrument: Violin

Walter Prystawski, CM (born 12 February 1933) is a Canadian classical violinist, conductor and teacher. For many years he was the concertmaster of the National Arts Centre Orchestra in Ottawa.

== Early life and education ==
Prystawski was born in Toronto, Ontario. He studied violin from 1944 to 1953 with Elie Spivak at the Toronto Conservatory of Music, graduating with an Artist Diploma from the University of Toronto Faculty of Music in 1953.

== Career ==
Prystawski joined the Toronto Symphony Orchestra in 1953. He was a member of the CBC Symphony Orchestra from 1953 to 1959.

He moved to Lucerne, Switzerland to attend masterclasses with Austrian violinist Wolfgang Schneiderhan, and subsequently became a member, then concertmaster, of the chamber orchestra Lucerne Festival Strings. He toured with the ensemble in Europe, South Africa and the Middle East.

Prystawski recorded extensively as member and soloist for Deutsche Grammophon Gesellschaft, and taught in the professional training program for violinists at the Konservatorium Dreilinden in Lucerne, Switzerland. He was First Concertmaster of the Basel Orchester Gesellschaft in Basel, Switzerland.

Prystawski returned to Canada as founding Concertmaster of the National Arts Centre Orchestra in Ottawa. Beginning in 1969, he appeared as soloist with the Orchestra for more than three decades. His first European tour with the orchestra was in 1973.

He also performed as a recitalist, guest soloist, and chamber music player in recital and on radio. Prystawski purchased a "J.B.Guadagnini" violin for $12,000 for the National Arts Centre. He became full owner of the instrument later; the violin was worth about $400,000 in 2006.

He taught at the University of Ottawa in the 1970s.

He was named a member of the Order of Canada in 1999.

Prystawski served on juries or as an assessor for the Montreal International Music Competition, the Conservatoires du Quebec, the Canada Council, CBC music competitions, the City of Ottawa and various music festival competitions.

Doctor of the University, University of Ottawa, 2001. Director, Sylva Gelber Foundation 1998 – .

Prystawski retired from the National Arts Centre Orchestra in 2006 after conflicts with its music director, Pinchas Zukerman. He performed with the orchestra in a series of farewell concerts conducted by Mario Bernardi.

== Family ==
Prystawski is married; he and his wife Victoria have two grown children: Linda, an actor and Laurence, a lawyer.
