= Festival Winds =

The Festival Winds was a Canadian Harmonie ensemble, which appeared at the Festival of the Sound, a summer music festival based in the resort town of Parry Sound, Ontario, from 1988 to 2014. The group is reuniting for a performance of Mozart's Serenade in B Flat K361 in the summer of 2024 at the Festival of the Sound.

The group specialized in the performance of Harmoniemusik, a historical genre written for the small wind ensemble called the Harmonie. The Festival Winds made the first recording of the first editions of Harmoniemusik the Harmoniemusik of K.V. Anhang C, works attributed to Wolfgang Amadeus Mozart.

The members of the ensemble were:

- James Mason, Brian James, oboes
- James Campbell, David Bourque, clarinets
- James McKay (bassoon), Christian Sharpe, bassoons
- James Sommerville, Neil Spaulding, horns
- Joel Quarrington, bass

As of 2021, James Mason is the Principal Oboe of the Kitchener-Waterloo Symphony and Canadian Chamber Ensemble. Brian James is Second Oboe and Solo English Horn with Symphony Nova Scotia, and instructor of oboe at the Fountain School of the Performing Arts at Dalhousie University. Neil Spaulding teaches French Horn at Queen's University at Kingston and is Second Horn with the Hamilton Philharmonic Orchestra. Joel Quarrington teaches at the University of Ottawa and is a Visiting Artist at the Royal Academy of Music in London. James Campbell, who has been the festival's Artistic Director since 1988, teaches at the Jacobs School of Music at Indiana University, as does David Bourque, who also teaches at the University of Toronto. James McKay is Professor Emeritus at the Don Wright Faculty of Music at the University of Western Ontario. James Sommerville is the principal hornist for the Boston Symphony Orchestra.
