= Kristi Allik =

Canadian music educator and composer (born 1952)

- Born: 6 February 1952 (age 74); Toronto, Ontario
- Education: Bachelor of Music; Master of Fine Arts degree Doctorate
- Alma mater: University of Toronto; Princeton University; University of Southern California

Kristi Allik (born 6 February 1952) is a Canadian music educator and composer.

== Biography ==
Born Kristi Anne Allik on 6 February 1952 in Toronto, Ontario, Canada and received a Bachelor of Music from the University of Toronto, a Master of Fine Arts degree from Princeton University and doctorate from the University of Southern California. She studied composition under John Weinzweig, Oskar Morawetz, Lothar Klein, Gustav Ciamaga, James Hopkins, Frederick Leseman and Milton Babbitt.

After completing her studies, Allik taught at the University of Victoria (1980–81) and the University of Western Ontario (1982–87) before she settled in Kingston, Ontario, and took a position as Associate Professor of Music at Queen's University where she taught electronic music, composition and jazz until her retirement in July 2013. She was also the Director of the Electronic Music Studios and the Computer Laboratory of Music Applications at Queen's University. Allik's compositions have been performed in Canada, the United States, Europe, Cuba and South America. She has also published articles and essays in professional publications.

== Awards and honours ==
- Grants and awards from the Canada Arts Council, Ontario Arts Council, SSHRC, Canadian Federation of University Women and the Chalmers Foundation
- Honourable mention from Ars Electronica competition
- Honourable mention Bourges International Music competition
- "The Music and Kristi Allik and Friends", Faculty Artist Series Performance, Queen's University School of Music, 26 January 2014, Grant Hall, Queen's University. Retirement concert in celebration of career of Professor Emerita, Kristi Allik.

== Works ==
Selected works include:

- Alambic Rhythms (23:00 / 1987) — Kristi Allik for tape and multi-image (Images: Robert Mulder)
- Cometose (27:00 / 1986) — Kristi Allik for tape and multi-image (Images: Robert Mulder)
- Electronic Purgatory — Kristi Allik, Robert Mulder
- Electronic Zen Garden — Kristi Allik, Bentley Jarvis
- Integra (10:00 / 1986) — Kristi Allik for tape and multi-image (Images: Robert Mulder)
- Introspection (7:00 / 1983) — Kristi Allik
- Rhapsody : for clarinet and electroacoustic tape (1986)
- Rondeau (22:00 / 1983) — Kristi Allik for tape and multi-image (Images: Robert Mulder)

=== Discography ===
Allik's works have been recorded and issued on CD, including:

- Twentieth Century Canadian Chamber Music - Audio CD (1991) by Clifford Crawley, David Keane, John Burge, Kristi Allik RFRC Clarke, ASIN: B000XOO4K0.
- The Skyharp (The Skyline Variations) (1997) MAMA CD-M001
- The Synergy, MAMA CD-M002
- Ecotonal Landscapes (1998) MAMA CD-M003
- The~infoweaver (2001) MAMA CD-M005
- Leark (2002) Live Electroacoustic Research Kitchen
- Electricities = Electricités (2003) CMCDS-S4 CMC
- DISContact! III (2003) PeP 007 Productions électro Productions
- Expurge (2004) LEARK (Live Electroacoustic Research Kitchen, Queen's University, Kingston, Ont.: Kristi Allik, David McCallum, Mike Cassells, Robert Mulder)
- Raras (2009) Conarte
