= Helen Weinzweig =

Canadian writer (1915–2010)

- Born: Perla Chuma Tenenbaum; May 21, 1915; Zurich, Switzerland
- Died: February 11, 2010 (aged 94); Toronto, Ontario, Canada
- Occupations: novelist, short stories
- Spouse: John Weinzweig
- Writing career
- Period: 1960s-1980s
- Notable works: Basic Black with Pearls, A View from the Roof

Helen Weinzweig (1915–2010), née Tenenbaum, was a Canadian writer. The author of two novels and a short story collection, her novel Basic Black with Pearls won the Toronto Book Award in 1981, and her short story collection A View from the Roof was a shortlisted nominee for the Governor General's Award for English-language fiction in 1989.

Born in Switzerland in 1915 to parents hailing from near Radom, Poland, she emigrated to Canada at age nine with her mother, and married composer John Weinzweig on July 12, 1940. She published her first short story, "Surprise!", in Canadian Forum in 1967, and her debut novel Passing Ceremony was published in 1973. She came to be regarded as one of Canada's first important feminist writers. Her style was marked by experimental forms with some aspects of metafiction; in her short story "Journey to Porquis", a writer on a train trip realizes that all of his fellow passengers are characters in his novel.

In the early 1980s, with the encouragement of director and producer Rina Fraticelli, the theatre artist Pol Pelletier adapted Weinzweig's short story My Mother’s Luck for the English language stage. Pelletier incarnated the Mother in productions in Montréal (at the Théâtre expérimental des femmes), Toronto, Ottawa, and Hamilton. Several of Weinzweig's short stories in A View from the Roof were later adapted for stage and CBC Radio broadcast by playwright Dave Carley.

Weinzweig died in 2010, aged 94.

== Works ==
- Passing Ceremony (1973)
- Basic Black with Pearls (1981)
  - in German, transl. Brigitte Jakobeit: Schwarzes Kleid mit Perlen. Wagenbach, Berlin 2019
- My mother's luck (1983)
- A View from the Roof (1989)
- Nero e perle (1994)

== Archive ==
Helen Weinzweig papers, Coll. 1945–2003 at the library, University of Toronto
