= Will Gay Bottje =

American composer (1925–2018)

Will Gay Bottje (June 30, 1925; Grand Rapids, Michigan - January 7, 2018; Grand Rapids, Michigan) was an American composer known for his contributions to electronic music.

Bottje was a graduate of the Juilliard School (Bachelor of Music in flute performance and Master of Music in composition) where he studied composition with Vittorio Giannini. He went on to pursue studies at the Eastman School of Music where he was a pupil of Bernard Rogers and Howard Hanson. From Eastman he earned a Doctor of Musical Arts in Composition, the second such degree to be awarded to a student from any institution. He also studied composition privately with Nadia Boulanger in Paris, and was a pupil of Henk Badings at the University of Utrecht's electronic music studio.

From 1957 to 1981 Bottje taught on the music faculty at Southern Illinois University in Carbondale, Illinois. There he founded and directed SIU's electronic music studio. One of his notable pupils at SIU was composer Larry Lake. During 21-23 October 1965, Bottje was also a SIU featured Vision '65 speaker/presenter.

== Selected compositions ==
=== Orchestral ===
- Commentaries for Guitar & Small Orchestra (also piano reduction)
- Concertino for Piccolo & Orchestra (piano reduction Zalo)
- Concerto for 2 Flutes & Orchestra (Piano vers. J/P publication)
- Concerto for Horn & Orchestra (also piano reduction)
- Concerto for Oboe, Violin & Orchestra (small)
- Flavors (Community or select high school)
- Full Circle
- Opener
- Sinfonia for Young String Orchestra
- Sounds From the West Shore
- The Ballad Singer

== Vocal and choral ==
- A Sentence Once Begun – Soprano, Str Quartet (Ch. Fry) (piano reduction)
- Cantata for the 53rd Sunday ( A Prayer for Middle Age) – SATB, 3 solos, keyboard, soprano obligato instrument
- Carol (from Wind In the Willows) – SATB
- Credo (R. Roland) – SSAATTBB
- Diptych (Rilke) – SSAATTBB, part 2 with keyboard
- Exhortation of the Dawn – SATB and Brass Ensemble or keyboard
- In Caverns All Alone (7 songs on mind) – Soprano or Tenor, flute, bassoon and piano
- In Praise of Music (5 songs) (Elizabethan texts) – Mezzo-Soprano and String Quartet (Rev. 1997–98)
- Last Minute Message for a Time Capsule – SATB, ten dr
- Quests of Odysseus (Kazantzakis) – tenor and piano (8 songs)
- Radiant Musings (N. Cousins) – SATB and keyboard, 11 short settings which can be done as a whole, in part, or individually
- "Songs from the Land Between the Rivers - SATB and Orchestra"
- Thrush Song – SSAATTBB, solos & flute
- Wayward Pilgrim (5 songs) (E. Dickinson) – Soprano or Mezzo-soprano & Piano

== Chamber music ==
- Brief Acquaintances – Oboe, Clarinet, Cello
- Brief Candles – Flute and Guitar
- Chorale and Allegro – four trumpets
- Concerto for Tuba – Tuba & Piano (also in ms. orch version)
- Country Wife-Suite (5 dances for Wycherly play) – flute, oboe, clarinet and bassoon.
- Dances: Real & Imagined – Guitar & String Quartet
- Designs- 2 flutes, cello, piano
- Diversions (Settings of Jim Thurber texts) – narrator, flute, oboe, bassoon, clarinet, horn and piano
- Dune Music – flute, oboe, cello and piano
- Duo Sonatina – 2 Euphoniums, piano (a vers. with 14-piece ensemble, also)
- Fireflies – Oboe, Harpsichord & String Quartet
- Incidental Music for a Restoration Comedy – clarinet, viola and cello
- Lighter Strings – Guitar & Harpsichord
- Litanies, Refrains & Alleluias – Trombone and piano
- Little Sonata No.1 – Flute and organ
- Little Sonata 5 – Clarinet and organ
- Little Sonata No.7 – Trumpet and organ
- Lyric Sonata (rev. 1998) – Bassoon and piano
- Music for a Joyous Occasion III – 2 flutes (or violins), and cello
- Prelude & Fugue – Tuba and piano
- Quintet for Flute & Strings
- Quintet for Clarinet, bassoon, french horn, violin, and contrabass
- Quintet Nr. 2 For Winds – flute, oboe, clarinet, bassoon and French horn
- Ready, Set-- 3 cellos, or 3 bassoons, or 3 Clarinets
- Recitative, Arioso & Finale – Trombone and piano
- Serenade – Wind quintet and string quartet
- Sextet for Strings – 2 violins, 2 violas and 2 cellos
- Sonata for 2 Cellos
- Sonatas 1,2, and 3 – cello and piano
- Sonata for Flute & Piano
- Sonata for Guitar
- Sonata for Trumpet & Piano
- Sonata for Violin & Piano
- Song and Dance (1998) – Violin and Piano
- Soundings – Oboe and Harpsichord
- Sprites & Phantoms – flute, oboe, clarinet, cello and piano
- String Quartets Nrs. 2, 4 & 5
- Symphony for Cello and Piano four-hands (rev. 1998)
- Three Flared Bells – trumpet, French horn and trombone
- Three Miniatures – flute and piano
- Tides – two pianos
- Trio – flute, cello and piano
- Trio (rev. 1998) – violin, cello and piano
- Triple Play- Clarinet & Piano
- Variations & Fugue – 4 trombones (400)
- Well-Tempered Flutes – 43 Preludes & Fugues from Bach WTC, arr for 2 flutes
- Wonders of the Night Sky – 8 piano ensemble
