= David Bourque =

- Born: Toronto, Ontario
- Genres: Classical
- Occupations: Clarinetist, teacher, educator, adjudicator
- Instruments: Clarinet, bass clarinet, basset horn

David Bourque is a Canadian musician, was a member of the Toronto Symphony Orchestra from 1983 to 2011. He played clarinet and bass clarinet in the TSO, and he has played on numerous film soundtracks. Bourque teaches in higher education at the University of Toronto and teaches regularly at the Jacobs School of Music at Indiana University.

Bourque is a native of Toronto and is a graduate of the University of Toronto Faculty of Music. Prior to his appointment to the Toronto Symphony Orchestra clarinet section, Bourque played in the orchestras of the Stratford Festival (1978–1983), the Canadian Opera Company (1977–1983) and the National Ballet of Canada (1977–1983). He has guested with the National Arts Centre Orchestra and L'Orchestre Symphonique de Montréal. He plays regularly in international chamber music festivals: Festival of the Sound (1987 onward) and the Ottawa International Chamber Music Festival (from 2002). Bourque is considered one of the finest bass clarinettists in North America and is Canada's leading basset horn player.

== Film and television sound recording ==
Bourque's work in film and television sound recording includes many episodes of the re-makes of the television series Alfred Hitchcock Presents, seven seasons on Road to Avonlea, Emily of New Moon and numerous episodes of Street Legal. He is also heard in the Academy Award-winning Norman Jewison film Moonstruck, the Dan Aykroyd–Jack Lemmon film Getting Away with Murder, and the miniseries soundtracks Texas and Larry McMurtry's The Streets of Laredo. Bourque's playing can also be heard in the film score recording of the music for the 1996 remake of The Island of Dr. Moreau and many made for television movies including the CBC docudrama of the Avro Arrow story.

== Publications ==
Bourque is the editor of Northdale Music International's first editions of the Harmoniemusik of K. Anh. C. These editions will be identified as first editions in new the Köchel catalogue of the works of Mozart. The complete Harmoniemusik of K. Anh. C has been recorded by the Festival Winds for CBC Records.

He is the author of a DVD tutorial Working The Single Reed and The Bass Clarinettist's Workbook, an annotated guide to orchestral excerpts, and he is published in a number of journals including The Clarinet and the Canadian Music Educator's Journal.

== Orchestral and chamber music recording ==
Bourque is a versatile and extensively recorded instrumental artist. Chamber music recordings include Mozart's Magnificent Voyage – Classical Kids. His recording credits include numerous recordings with the Toronto Symphony Orchestra, compact discs and radio broadcasts for CBC, the first recording of the Barenreiter edition of Mozart's Serenade in B flat (K. 361, "Gran Partita"), the Canadian Saxophone Quintet's recording Thanks for the Memories, Gary Kulesha's Third Chamber Concerto for bass clarinet and winds (Harmonie) and Mysterium Conjunctionis with clarinettist James Campbell. The latter are two of the five works that have been composed for Bourque by Gary Kulesha. Bourque, Campbell and Kulesha are mentioned in connection with the Mysterium in The Cambridge Guide to the Clarinet.

== Teaching ==
He has taught in higher education since 1979 and has held positions at the University of Toronto Faculty of Music and the University of Western Ontario. In 2004–2005, he was visiting professor at Mount Allison University and in the spring of 2008 was an associate professor at the University of Prince Edward Island. Bourque is a regular guest instructor at the Jacobs School of Music, Indiana University where he has taught studio clarinet, given lectures, coached chamber music and given master classes.

Bourque acted as an adjudicator for clarinet and bass clarinet in the YouTube Symphony Orchestra II.

He currently teaches clarinet, bass clarinet and coaches the wind players of the orchestra at the University of Toronto. Bourque is a member of the teaching faculty of the National Youth Orchestra of Canada.
