= Samuel Dolin =

Canadian composer and music educator (1917– 2002)

- Born: Samuel Joseph Dolin; 22 August 1917; Montreal, Quebec, Canada
- Died: 13 January 2002 (aged 84) Midland, Ontario, Canada
- Occupations: Composer, educator
- Instrument: Piano

Samuel Joseph Dolin (22 August 1917 – 13 January 2002) was a Canadian composer, music educator, and arts administrator. An associate of the Canadian Music Centre and a founding member of the Canadian League of Composers (CLC), he served as the CLC's vice president from 1967 to 1968, and president from 1969 to 1973. He was also vice-president of the International Society for Contemporary Music (ISCM) from 1972 to 1975, and chairman of the ISCM's Canadian Chapter from 1970 to 1974. From 1945 to 2001, he taught music composition, music theory, and piano at The Royal Conservatory of Music, where he trained dozens of notable Canadian composers.

== Early career and education ==
Born in Montreal, Dolin received his early musical training in his native city, where he studied piano and music theory with Tania and Vladmir Elgart, Vladimir Emenitov, and Stanley Gardner. In the late 1930s, he entered the University of Toronto, where he earned a Bachelor of Music degree in 1942. From 1942 to 1945, he taught music at Trinity College School and was also music supervisor for the public schools in Durham and Northumberland counties in Ontario.

In 1945, Dolin began graduate studies in music composition under John Weinzweig at the Toronto Conservatory of Music (now The Royal Conservatory of Music). At the same time, he joined the conservatory's faculty. He eventually returned to the University of Toronto, where in 1958 he earned a Doctor of Music degree in composition. His other teachers included Weldon Kilburn, Reginald Godden, E. Robert Schmitz, and Ernst Krenek.

== Work as a composer ==
Dolin's compositional output includes orchestral music, chamber music, choral music, works for solo piano, vocal art songs, and a number of dramatic works. His music encompasses a variety of styles, from traditional romanticism to chromaticism and other modern compositional techniques. An example of one of his more traditional works is his Serenade for Strings, which was premiered by the CBC Symphony Orchestra at the 1952 Winter Olympics in Oslo, Norway. One of his more experimental works is Drakkar (1972), a stage work about the first Viking sightings of the New World. The work uses a chamber ensemble with electronic music, three vocal soloists, a multimedia slideshow, dancers, and a narrator.

The majority of Dolin's larger scale works date from his early to mid-career. Half of his orchestral works were written during the 1950s, including the first two of his three symphonies. His only opera Casino "Greed" premiered in 1967. He wrote the film score for the 1970 movie Machina. He also contributed music to Canadian radio and television during the 1970s.

From the 1980s on, Dolin wrote mostly smaller scale works such as his well-known Two Vocalises for Two Celli (1990). Two notable exceptions are his last symphonic works, Concerto for Oboe and Violoncello with Orchestra (1989) and Double Concerto for Oboe, Cello and Orchestra. The latter work was premiered on 31 March 1988 in a concert honoring the composer's 70th birthday at the Jane Mallett Theatre, St Lawrence Centre, which was broadcast on the CBC Radio program Two New Hours. The soloists for the performance included Dolin's daughter, cellist Elizabeth Dolin, and oboist Patricia Morehead.

== Work as an educator ==
Dolin taught music composition, music theory, and piano at The Royal Conservatory of Music (RCMT) for 56 years. In 1966 he founded the RCMT's electronic music studio after touring similar facilities in the United States and Europe. He also completely revamped the associate degree programs for composition and music theory at the RCMT. In May 1984 he established the Canadian Contemporary Music Workshop (CCMW) at the RCMT. The annual workshop consisted of lectures, readings, and concert performances of new orchestral and chamber music. Historically most of the works presented have been by Canadians but the workshop is open to anyone. Dolin served as the artistic director of the workshop until his retirement from the RCMT in 2001. The school currently awards the "Dr. Samuel J. Dolin Scholarship in Composition" annually.

Dolin's teaching career at the RCMT produced an impressive roster of composers. The success of his students is attributed to not only his pedagogical methods but also to his advocacy of their work. Dolin often performed his students' compositions in faculty recitals or arranged public concerts exhibiting their work at the conservatory. The compositional style of his pupils is highly varied, which demonstrates Dolin's remarkable ability to adapt his teaching to the interests of each individual student. Some of his notable pupils are: Milton Barnes, Stuart Broomer, Brian Cherney, Steven Gellman, Herbie Helbig, Jim Hiscott, Paul Hoffert, Scott Irvine, Lorraine Johnson, Moe Koffman, Gary Kulesha, Larysa Kuzmenko, Joseph Lerner, Michel Longtin, Gene Martynec, John Mills-Cockell, Michael Pepa, Allan Rae, Eric Robertson, John Robertson, Clark Ross, Ann Southam, Ben Steinberg, Timothy Sullivan, Roman Toi, Alan Torok, Ben Trowell, Ruth Watson Henderson, John Welsman, E. C. Woodley, Wes Wraggett, and Jack Zaza.
