= Canadian Electronic Ensemble =

Canadian electronic music ensemble

- Origin: Toronto, Ontario, Canada
- Genre: Electronic
- Years active: 1971–present
- Members: David Jaeger (1971–); James Montgomery (1971–); Paul Stillwell (1995–); Rose Bolton (1999–); John Kameel Farah (2011–); David Sutherland (2017–)
- Past members: David Grimes (1972–1984): Larry Lake (1972–2013); Laura Wilcox (1995–1998); Michael Dobinson (1992–2005)
- Website: Official website

The Canadian Electronic Ensemble (CEE) is a Canadian electronic music ensemble based in Toronto, Ontario. Founded in 1971 by David Grimes, David Jaeger, Larry Lake and James Montgomery, it is the oldest continuously active live-electronic performing group in the world. In 1984, they performed at the International Society for Contemporary Music's World Music Days Festival. In 1986 they joined the Toronto Symphony Orchestra to perform the world premiere of Steven Gellman's Universe Symphony. The ensemble has also appeared in concerts with the Orchestre Métropolitain de Montréal, the Ottawa Symphony Orchestra, and the Vancouver Symphony Orchestra. Since 1974, the CEE has presented an annual concert series in Toronto. They have also given regular international tours since 1975. From 1985 until his death in 2013, Lake served as the CEE's Artistic Director. The ensemble's other current members are Jaeger, Montgomery, Paul Stillwell, Rose Bolton, John Farah, and David Sutherland.
