= Steven Gellman =

Canadian composer and pianist

Steven Gellman (born 16 September 1947) is a Canadian composer, pianist and professor. He has been commissioned to write works for the Besançon International Music Festival, the CBC Symphony Orchestra, the Hamilton Philharmonic, McGill University, Musica Camerata, the National Arts Centre Orchestra, the Ottawa Symphony Orchestra, Opera Lyra, the Pierrot Ensemble, the Stratford Festival, and the Toronto Symphony Orchestra among others. Since 1976 he has taught music composition and theory at the University of Ottawa.

== Early life ==
He was born in Toronto. Gellman began his musical training there with Samuel Dolin with whom he studied piano and music composition. He began his career as a concert pianist while still a teenager, first drawing acclaim for his 1964 performance of his own piano concerto with the CBC Symphony Orchestra. For that composition he won the BMI Student Composer Award.

In 1965 Gellman entered the Juilliard School where he studied through 1968 with teachers such as Luciano Berio, Vincent Persichetti, and Roger Sessions. During the summers of 1965 and 1966 he attended the Aspen Music Festival and School where he was a pupil of Darius Milhaud. In 1973 he entered the graduate music composition program at the Conservatoire de Paris where he spent three years studying under Olivier Messiaen. In 1976 he graduated from the conservatoire with a Premier Prix. In 1970 he won the UNESCO prize for "the best work by a composer under the age of 25", for "Mythos" for flute and string quartet.

== Career ==
One of Gellman's most extensive works, "Chori", was premiered by the Toronto Symphony in 1975. Upon his return to Canada in 1976 Gellman became Professor of Composition and Theory at the University of Ottawa. During the late 70's he composed pieces for piano including "Poeme", for Angela Hewitt; "Wind Music", commissioned by the Canadian Brass; "Dialogue" for horn solo; and "Dialogue II" for flute and piano.

In 1978 Gellman received a commission from the French Government to compose a work for the Festival de Besançon, France, in honour of Olivier Messiaen's 70th Birthday. The result, "Deux Tapisseries for 15 players", was given its premiere on 11 September 1978, in Besançon by the Ars Nova Ensemble conducted by Marius Constant; it was given a repeat performance one month later in Paris.

Gellman's expertise in the area of orchestral music triggered a commission from the Toronto Symphony to compose Awakening in 1983, a short concert overture moving from darkness to light, chaos to order, through a gradual accumulation of energy. The work was one of the three introduced during the orchestra's first season in Roy Thompson Hall. In the spring of 1983, it was featured by the orchestra during a major tour throughout Europe.

In 1986, the Toronto Symphony unveiled another newly commissioned Gellman opus, Universe Symphony, featuring the synthesizers of the Canadian Electronic Ensemble as soloists with the orchestra under conductor Andrew Davis. A performance later that year at Expo 86 in Vancouver, featured the Vancouver Symphony. Further performances followed, at the Festival de Lanaudiere with the Orchestre Metropolitan de Montreal and in Ottawa with the Ottawa Symphony. Composed with funding from the Canada Council and the Ontario Arts Council. It is dedicated "to all beings in the aspiration for World Peace". Universe Symphony brought further international recognition.

In the wake of "Universe Symphony", Jon Kimura Parker commissioned Steven Gellman to compose a work for him. The result was: "Keyboard Triptych" for Piano/Synthesizer with which Parker toured Canada, the U.S and Britain.

== Major works ==
Gellman has composed a variety of works

- "Love's Garden", for Soprano and Orchestra;
- "Canticles of Saint Francis", for Choir and Orchestra, for the 150th anniversary of the Red Cross;
- "Burnt Offerings" for String Orchestra;
- "Musica Eterna", for String Quartet;
- "Red Shoes" (for the S.M.C.Q. );
- "Chiaroscuro";
- Album for Piano (published by Frederick Harris Co.);
- "Sonata for Cello and Piano";
- "Jaya Overture" (for the N.A.C.O.)
- "Fanfare for the New Millennium"
- Piano Quartet (commissioned by Radio Canada, world premiere on 3 April 2004 in Montreal, performed by Musica Camerata.
- Viola Concerto (world premiere on 29 January 2007 at the National Arts Centre in Ottawa)
- "Musings" for Piano Trio (premiered by the Gryphon Trio at The Ottawa International Chamber Music Festival (2009)

== Personal life ==
Steven Gellman lives in Ottawa with his wife, Cheryl, a visual artist. They have two grown children, Dana and Misha.

== Recognition ==
- Canadian Composer of the Year (1987)
