= Clark Ross =

Clark Winslow Ross is a Canadian composer, guitarist, and music educator of Venezuelan birth. A composer of mainly works for orchestra and chamber music, he has won first prize in composition competitions held by the Hamilton Philharmonic (1993, for Passage 1), the Winnipeg Symphony Orchestra (1993, for Passage 3), Symphony Nova Scotia (2002, for Three Lorca Sketches), and the Newfoundland and Labrador Arts and Letters (2002). He has received grants from a number of notable organizations, including the Canada Council, the Canadian Broadcasting Corporation, the Newfoundland Symphony Orchestra, and the Royal Bank of Canada among others. His compositions have been performed throughout North America and in Europe.

Born in Maracaibo in 1957, Ross entered The Royal Conservatory of Music in Toronto in 1980, earning an Associate diploma there in 1985. While there he studied music composition with Samuel Dolin. He continued with further studies in music composition at the University of Toronto where he was a pupil of John Beckwith. There he earned a Master of Music in 1986 and a Doctor of Music in 1992. In 1988 he was an artist-in-residence at the Banff Centre for the Arts and held the same title at Stanford University in 1989. In 2003 he was composer-in-residence at the Waterford New Music Festival in Ireland.

While a graduate student, he taught on the music faculties of the Royal Conservatory from 1987 to 1992 and McMaster University in 1990–1991. Since 1992 he has been a professor of electronic music, guitar, music composition, music theory, and orchestration at Memorial University of Newfoundland. He was notably the recipient of Memorial University's President's Award for Outstanding Research in 1999. From 1997 to 2002 he was director of evening services at St. Thomas' Anglican Church in St. John's, Newfoundland.

He is currently married to Jennifer Porter, Religious Studies professor at MUN, and father of Julia, Andrew, and Alexander.

== Sources ==
- Clark Ross at The Living Composers Project
- Bio of Clark Ross at Memorial University of Newfoundland
