= David Grimes (composer) =

American composer

David Grimes (born 9 March 1948, in Salem, Massachusetts) is an American composer. In 1970, he graduated from the Berklee College of Music with a Bachelor of Music degree. He then entered the University of Toronto where he earned a Master of Music in 1972. In 1971, he co-founded the Canadian Electronic Ensemble (CEE) with David Jaeger, James Montgomery and Larry Lake. He performed internationally and made several recordings with the group over the next 15 years. In 1976, his composition Increscents won the CBC National Radio Competition for Young Composers. In 1986, he returned to the United States. He currently teaches on the faculty of Northeastern University.
