= Gustav Ciamaga =

Canadian composer, music educator, and writer

Gustav Ciamaga (April 10, 1930 – June 11, 2011) was a Canadian composer, music educator, and writer. An associate of the Canadian Music Centre and a member of the Canadian League of Composers, he was best known for his compositions of electronic music, although he produced several non-electronic works. His compositions have been performed throughout North America and Europe. His work Curtain Raiser was commissioned for the opening of the National Arts Centre in 1969. An honorary member of the Canadian Electroacoustic Community, he invented a number of electronic music apparatuses, including the Serial Sound Structure Generator. As a writer he contributed articles to numerous music journals, magazines, and other publications.

== Biography ==
Born in London, Ontario, Ciamaga studied at the University of Western Ontario from 1951 to 1954 while simultaneously receiving private instruction from Gordon Delamont. He entered the music program at the University of Toronto where he studied music composition with John Weinzweig and John Beckwith from 1954–1956. He then pursued graduate studies in musicology and composition at Brandeis University where he earned an MFA in 1958. His teachers at Brandeis included Arthur Berger, Harold Shapero, and Irving Fine. He remained in Waltham, Massachusetts through 1963 where he organized his own electronic music studio.

In 1963 Ciamaga was appointed to the music faculty at the University of Toronto. Two years later he was appointed the director of the school's electronic music studio after the death of its first head Myron Schaeffer. In 1968 he became the chairman of the school's theory and composition department. In 1970 he took a year sabbatical to work in several electronic music studios in Europe. In 1977 he assumed the post of dean of U of T's Faculty of Music, a position he held through 1984. He served as acting president of The Royal Conservatory of Music in 1983–1984. Among his notable pupils are composers Bruce Pennycook, Lesley Barber, John Fodi, Larry Lake, Wende Bartley, John Mills-Cockell and John Rimmer.

Ciamaga died in Toronto in 2011 following a long battle with cancer.

== Works ==
=== Computer compositions ===
- HPSCD (1986)
- Apres-MIDI (1986)
- For M: (1986)
- PERC (1986)
- For P: (1986–87)
- Lost Tango (1987)
- Distant Timbres (1987)
- Facing East (1987)
- Upon hearing the first koto in spring (1987)
- Psamba (1987)
- Pour M: (1987)
- Bach again! (1987–88)
- Three part invention (1988)
- Facing East no.2 (1988)
- For G: (1988)
- Facing East no.3 (1988–89)
- Bitfire (1989)
- Facing North (1989)
- "It's about time" (1989)
- Apres J (1990)
- Three 3 part inventions, no.2-4 (1990)
- VU (1990)
- Three excursions and a coda (1990)
- Repercussions (1991)
- B as in Bach (1991)
- Four Microclips (1992)
- Where the wild things are (1992–93)
- Traces of yesterday (1993)
- Explorations of the New Age (1992–93)
- Possible Spaces no.1 (1994)
- Quartets (1994)
- Four more Microclips (1995)
- Possible Spaces no.2 (1996)
- Possible Spaces no.3 (1996)
- Possible Spaces no.4 (1997)
- A precipitate of symbols (1998–89)
- Bitfire [version 2] (1999)
- Possible Spaces no.5 (2000)
- Possible Spaces no.6 (2001)
- Possible Spaces no.7 (2002)
- Prologue and Postscript (2003)
- Spadina Minilogues (2003)
- Possible Spaces no.8 (2003)
- Order of Ideas (2003–04)
- Possible Spaces no.9 (2004)
- For L (2004)
- Paradigm Lost (2004)
- "Waiting..." (2004)
- Possible Spaces no.10 (2004)
- For DL: (2004)
- Facing North no.2 (2004)
- PizzA (2005)
- Possible Spaces no.11 (2006)
- Three part invention no.5 (2006)
- Possible Spaces no.12 (2006)
- The Computer in my Life (2007)
- It's about time again (2008)

=== Tape compositions ===
- One part invention (1965)
- Two part invention no.1 (1965)
- Scherzo (new version) (1966)
- Two part invention no.2 (1966)
- Fanfare for computer (1967)
- Four part invention (1967)
- Ragamuffin no. 1 (1967)
- Ragamuffin no. 2 (1967)
- Two part invention no.4 (1967)
- Two part invention no.5 (1967)
- Two part invention no.6 (1968)
- Two part invention no.7 (1968)
- Brandenburg Concerto no. 1 (1969)
- Two part invention no.8 (1970)
- Canon for Stravinsky (1972)
- Solipsism (1972)
- A greeting for JW (1973)
- Ars Nova (1976)
- Two part invention no.9 (1983)
- "Is the Moon further than St. John?" (1985)
- Patterns; Daydreams; Excursions (1985–86)
- For B: (1986)
- For H: (1986)
- For I: (1986)
