= Arnold Walter =

Canadian musicologist (1902–1973)

Arnold Walter (University of Toronto Archives)

Arnold Maria Walter, OC (August 30, 1902 – October 6, 1973) was a Canadian musicologist, educator, composer and writer. He founded the Canadian Opera Company, and was Director of Music at University of Toronto.

== Early life and education ==
Arnold Maria Walter was born in Hanušovice, Moravia, Austria-Hungary (now in the Czech Republic). He studied law at the University of Prague, then musicology at the University of Berlin. In addition, he had private music lessons in piano and composition with Rudolf Breithaupt, Frederic Lamond, and Franz Schreker.

== Career ==
In the early 1930s, Walter wrote the music column for Die Weltbühne, and was music critic for the Vorwärts magazine. In 1937, he emigrated to Canada and taught at Upper Canada College.

From 1952 to 1968, Walter was music director of the music faculty of the University of Toronto. Among his notable pupils were pianist Howard Brown, Phil Nimmons.

He received an Honorary Doctor of Music from Mount Allison University in 1966. In 1972, Walter was appointed Officer of the Order of Canada.

== Death and legacy ==
He died in Toronto, Ontario, Canada. His records were donated to the National Library of Canada by his stepdaughter.

== Works ==
- Sonatina for Cello and Piano, 1940
- Trio for Violin, Cello and Piano, 1940
- Sonata for Violin and Piano, 1940
- Symphony in G minor for large orchestra, 1942
- Suite for Piano, 1945
- For the Fallen for soprano, mixed chorus and orchestra, 1949
- Concerto for Orchestra, 1958
- Sonata for Piano Forte, 1950
- Summer Idyll for tape, 1960
