= John Weinzweig =

Canadian composer (1913–2006)

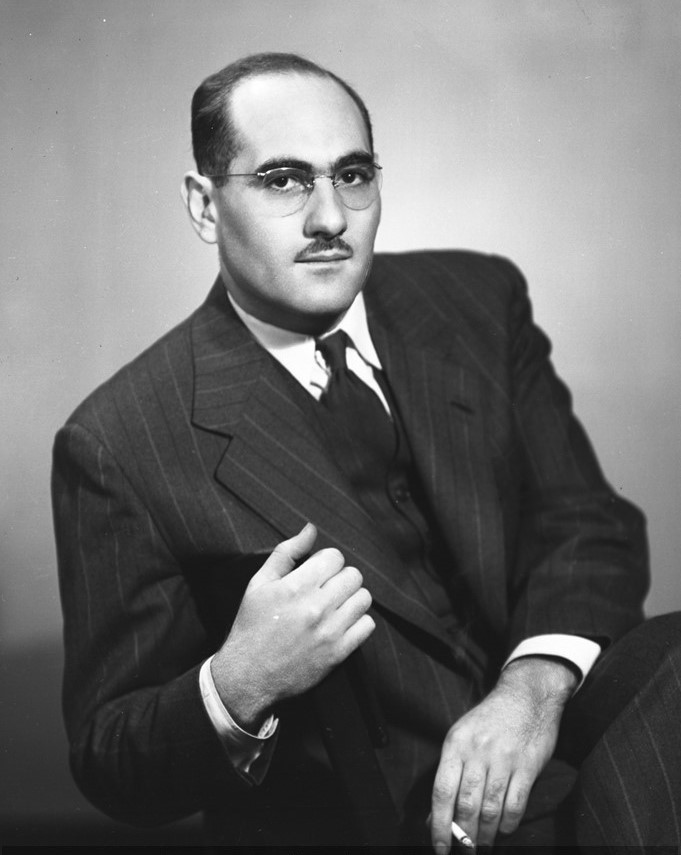
- Weinzweig in 1945
- Born: March 11, 1913; Toronto, Canada
- Died: August 24, 2006 (aged 93); Toronto
- Education: University of Toronto; Eastman School of Music
- Occupations: Composer, teacher
- Spouse: Helen Weinzweig

Olympic medal record

Art competitions
Silver medal – second place	1948 London	Instrumental/chamber

John Jacob Weinzweig OC OOnt (March 11, 1913 – August 24, 2006) was a composer, teacher, and advocate of contemporary Canadian concert music.

Born in Toronto, Weinzweig went to Harbord Collegiate Institute, then studied music at the University of Toronto. In 1937, he left for the United States to study under Bernard Rogers. During the Second World War, he began composing film music, and in 1952 he became a professor at the University of Toronto. In the previous year he had co-founded the Canadian League of Composers, and he was actively involved in several other organizations representing musicians and composers.

In 1948 he won a silver medal in the art competitions of the Olympic Games for his Divertimento no 1 for solo flute and strings.

In 1974, he was made an Officer of the Order of Canada. In 1988, he was awarded the Order of Ontario.

In 2004, Weinzweig was the recipient of the inaugural Lifetime Achievement Award at the annual SOCAN Awards in Toronto.

== Early life ==
John Jacob Weinzweig was the eldest child of Joseph and Rose (Burstyn) Weinzweig, Polish Jewish immigrants. His younger siblings were named Morris and Grace Weinzweig. In Russian-occupied Poland, his father was temporarily imprisoned for participating in radical union movements, and the family moved to Canada shortly after.

His first music lessons were at the Workman's Circle Peretz School at age 14, where he participated in mandolin classes. He went on to attend Harbord Collegiate Institute, a secondary school where the students consisted primarily of the children of Jewish immigrant families. Harbord had one of the only school orchestra programs in Canada at the time, and it was here that he learned to play the tuba and saxophone, and even had the opportunity to conduct. His teacher recognized his talent and encouraged his parents to send him to piano lessons. He studied under several teachers and in the years following high school, Weinzweig attained a university entrance level in both piano and theory at the Royal Conservatory. His brother, Morris, also took up the saxophone and, from a young age, the two brothers earned pocket money by playing at local events such a school dances and political rallies. Morris went on to become a leading studio musician on the saxophone.

Weinzweig married Helen Tenenbaum on July 12, 1940.

== Postsecondary education ==
The University of Toronto Faculty of Music was founded in 1918, but it was not until the early 1930s that it began to offer classes leading to a degree. John Weinzweig was among the first to enroll in the new program and obtained his B.Mus. in 1937. During his undergraduate degree, he was continuously producing short works, most of which were romantic and impressionistic. After observing Weinzweig's work, composer and school director Howard Hanson encouraged him to pursue Master's studies in composition at the Eastman School of Music (University of Rochester). He followed Hanson's advice and acquired his M.Mus. in 1938. During his university career, he also developed an interest in conducting, as he found that conducting experience was useful to him as a composer.

== Use of serialism ==
Weinzweig's move toward serialism was not a complete transition; he was very selective and deliberate in which principles he chose to adopt. While he acknowledged that Schoenberg's powerful influence on the musical world, he was not particularly taken with his music and preferred that of composers such as Berg and Webern. His attraction to serialism was not the same as that of its Viennese founders. Since he was not taught strictly using tonality in his early education, he did not feel the need to rebel and use serialism simply as a means to avoid tonality. While he often employed the techniques used by Stravinsky, Bartók, Copland and Varèse, he did not teach these methods to his students exclusively.

The way in which Weinzweig used a 12-tone row in his compositions differed from the traditional method. He would use the row as a motivic invention and develop that motive in a neoclassical manner, treating it more like a theme than a means of tonal organization. The row typically remains identifiable throughout the piece but is not limited by strict serial procedures.

== Stylistic influences ==
=== Pop music ===
The influence of popular music of the 1930s can be seen in Weinzweig's work, especially his Divertimentos No.2 and 3, which mimic the quirky rhythms of this music. His Divertimento No. 8 and Out of the Blue exhibit elements of both blues and ragtime. Even his Violin Concerto and Wind Quartet show characteristics of blues in their melodies.

=== Inuit folk materials ===
Along with another choral piece composed around the same time (To the Lands Over Yonder), his piece titled Edge of the World is the first work to use Inuit folk music as compositional material.

== Canadian League of Composers ==
In 1951, John Weinzweig met with fellow composers Harry Somers and Samuel Dolin to discuss the issue of composing professionally in Canada. They wished to raise awareness and acceptance of Canadian music to be listened to and taken seriously, and contacted around a dozen other Canadian composers who shared their desires. Within a year they had acquired a federal charter as the Canadian League of Composers (CLC), of which Weinzweig was the first president. Though the original members were from close within Weinzweig's circle, the idea of the CLC was to bring composers together to work for a common cause, not to achieve a uniform national style. The mindset was much like that of the Group of Seven 30 years earlier in Canadian art.

The CLC's first project was to sponsor public concerts featuring new Canadian compositions. These concerts featured a variety of repertoire including orchestral works, chamber music and opera, but they lacked the support of many established performing groups. Nevertheless, some 30 concerts of exclusively Canadian music occurred from 1951 to 1960. The program of the first concert, on May 16, 1951, consisted entirely of Weinzweig's music. The concert, which was jointly held by the Canadian Broadcasting Corporation (CBC) and the Royal Conservatory of Music of Toronto, made an immediate impression, and prompted a lengthy review in the magazine, Canadian Forum.

They next took on the task of editing an anthology of newly composed piano repertoire. This resulted in the accumulation of a small library which housed the scores of many members, and provided the use of these scores to interested conductors and performers.

In 1960, the CLC organized the International Conference of Composers as part of the Stratford music festival. This conference drew composers from 30 different countries, including Krenek, Varèse and Berio. After a decade, national membership had grown to around 40 people, including four women, and continued to grow steadily throughout the century.

Weinzweig championed Canadian contemporary classical music throughout his life.

== Educator ==
Weinzweig's enormously influential career as an educator began in 1939 when he was appointed by Ernest MacMillan to the music faculty at the Toronto Conservatory of Music; he taught through 1960 with the exception of a leave in 1944. In 1952, he joined the faculty of the University of Toronto where he taught until his retirement in 1978. He continued to teach masterclasses, seminars, and workshops at a number of institutions of higher learning during the 1980s. He also taught privately. His large number of notable students included:

- Murray Adaskin
- Robert Aitken
- Kristi Allik
- Milton Barnes
- Robert Bauer
- John Beckwith
- Norma Beecroft
- Lorne Betts
- Howard Cable
- Brian Cherney
- Gustav Ciamaga
- Samuel Dolin
- Anne Eggleston
- John Fodi
- Clifford Ford
- Harry Freedman
- Srul Irving Glick
- Gary J. Hayes
- Richard Henninger
- David Jaeger
- Jack Kane
- Walter Kemp
- Peter Paul Koprowski
- Alfred Kunz
- Edward Laufer
- Bruce Mather
- Elma Miller
- Ben McPeek
- Mavor Moore
- Marjan Mozetich
- Phil Nimmons
- Kenneth Peacock
- Paul Pedersen
- John Rimmer
- Doug Riley
- R. Murray Schafer
- Jack Sirulnikoff
- Harry Somers
- Ben Steinberg
- Fred Stone
- Rudy Toth
- Andrew Twa
- Kenny Wheeler

== Selected compositions ==
=== Early works ===
John Weinzweig's early works concentrate primarily on orchestra. Some pieces that he wrote as a student include Whirling Dwarf, The Enchanted Hill, and A Tale of Tuamoto (based on a Polynesian legend). While none of these gained much recognition at the time, some did receive readings by the orchestra at Eastman. One of his earliest orchestral works, written shortly after obtaining his master's degree, is Rhapsody (1941). This version was not particularly successful, but was later salvaged by one of his first pupils, Victor Feldbrill, and revived. In some of his early piano suites, the emergence of 12-tone serialism as a method of pitch organization can be seen.

In 1948, Weinzweig won a silver medal in the art competitions of the Olympic Games for his "Divertimenti for Solo Flute and Strings".

=== Historically significant works ===
==== Piano Sonata ====
This sonata is a work that most closely represents the neoclassicism techniques of Stravinsky. The crisp, economical texture makes the piece look easy on paper. It contains a 12-note series that unfolds one or two notes at a time and keys are often implied during cadences, showing no clear effort to avoid doing so. These factor later became a trade mark of Weinzweig and can be seen in many of his works.

==== Red Ear of Corn ====
Red Ear of Corn was the first Canadian score to be commissioned for the Canadian Ballet Festival. The material consists of a blend of Iroquois music, French-Canadian folk song and fiddle music. The music is meant to tell the story of why red cobs of corn can occasionally be found in the yellow corn fields of Québec. In this story, an Iroquois maiden is stabbed by the chief of her tribe, whom she was forcibly engaged to. It is said that red corn appears out of the ground where her blood was spilled.

This was an important work for Canada because it showed that the country's composers could write large-scale works for orchestra. It created exposure for musical material of Canadian origin, but also revealed a new treatment of folk material. Rather than just composing an accompaniment for an original folk song, Weinzweig took small rhythmic and melodic gestures from the melodies and incorporated them into his writing. This approach, inspired by Béla Bartók, continues to be used by Canadian composers today.

==== Suite for Piano No. 1 ====
This piano suite was the first Canadian composition to use Arnold Schoenberg's 12-tone system, though in a modified form. It consists of three movements; Waltzling, Dirgeling and Themes with Variables. In this piece, the tone row is treated as motivic material used with the traditional neoclassic forms, such as ABA and theme and variations. Waltzing exhibits another variation of this system by using a row consisting of only nine tones. This row, which seems to show a preference for minor thirds and sixths, is used as the basis of both the melody and the rhythmic ostinato that accompanies it.

The motivic repetition and overall ABA form lessens the usual harsh sound of a tone row. At the time, this piece was rejected by many colleagues and the majority of the general public.

In 1978, a five-record set of Weinzweig's music was included in the inaugural volume of the Anthology of Canadian Music Series. The Weinzweig portrait in the Canadian Composers Portraits series was released in 2002.

== List of works ==
The list below includes title, date of composition, and city/year of premiere. All works in manuscript unless publisher and date of publication is given.

=== Stage, film and radio ===
- The Whirling Dwarf, ballet. 1937 (Toronto 1939). Percussion, piano, strings (reduced from full orchestra).
- Four scores for NFB films: North West Frontier; West Wind: The Story of Tom Thomson; The Great Canadian Shield; Turner Valley. (1941-5).
- Over 100 radio (CBC) drama scores, including Riel, Jalna, and White Empire.

=== Orchestra, band ===
- Legend. 1937. Full orchestra.
- The Enchanted Hill. 1938 (Rochester 1938). Timpani, percussion, harp, strings.
- Suite. 1938 (Rochester 1938). Timpani, percussion, harp, strings.
- Symphony. 1940 (Rochester 1941). Timpani, percussion, strings.
- Rhapsody. 1941 (Toronto 1957). Timpani, percussion, strings.
- Interlude in an Artist's Life. 1943 (Toronto 1944, CBC broadcast). String orchestra. Leeds 1961.
- Our Canada: Music for Radio No. 1. 1943 (Toronto 1943, CBC broadcast). Timpani, percussion, strings. In: Music for Winds I, Canadian Musical Heritage, v. 21, 1998.
- Band-Hut Sketches, No. 1 and 2. 1944 (Ottawa 1944). Concert band.
- Edge of the World: Music for Radio No. 2. 1946 (Toronto 1946, CBC broadcast). Timpani, percussion, strings. Leeds 1967.
- Red Ear of Corn (suite). 1949 (Toronto 1951). Timpani, percussion, strings.
- Round Dance. 1950 (Toronto 1950). Timpani, percussion, strings. (Band arrangement by Howard Cable). Leeds 1966 (band).
- Symphonic Ode. 1958 (Saskatoon 1959). Timpani, percussion, strings. Leeds 1962.
- Dummiyah/Silence. 1969 (Toronto, CBC broadcast 1969). Full orchestra.
- Out of the Blues. 1981 (Toronto 1982). Concert band.
- Divertimento No. 9. 1982 (Toronto 1982). Full orchestra.

=== Soloist(s) with orchestra, band ===
- Spectre. 1938 (Toronto 1939). Timpani, string orchestra.
- A Tale of Tuamotu. 1939. Bassoon, orchestra.
- Divertimento No. 1. 1946 (Vancouver 1946). Flute, string orchestra. Boosey & Hawkes 1950.
- Divertimento No. 2. 1948 (Toronto 1948). Oboe, string orchestra. Boosey & Hawkes 1951.
- Concerto. 1951-54 (Toronto 1955). Violin, orchestra.
- Wine of Peace (Calderon de la Barca, translated by A. Symons, anon). 1957 (Toronto 1958). Soprano, orchestra.
- Divertimento No. 3. 1960 (Toronto 1961). Bassoon, string orchestra. Leeds 1963.
- Divertimento No. 5. 1961 (Pittsburgh 1961). Trumpet, trombone, winds, timpani, percussion. Leeds 1969.
- Concerto. 1966 (Toronto 1966). Piano, orchestra.
- Concerto. 1967 (Toronto 1967). Leeds 1969. Harp, chamber orchestra.
- Divertimento No. 4. 1968 (Toronto 1968). Clarinet, string orchestra.
- Divertimento No. 6. 1972 (Toronto 1972). Alto sax, string orchestra.
- Divertimento No. 7. 1979 (Vancouver 1980). Horn, string orchestra.
- Divertimento No. 8. 1980 (Toronto 1989). Tuba, string orchestra, timpani, percussion.
- Divertimento No. 10. 1988 (Toronto 1989). Piano, string orchestra.
- Divertimento No. 11. 1990 (Hamilton 1990). English horn, string orchestra.
- Divertimento No. 12. 1998 (Hamilton 1998). Woodwind quintet, string orchestra.

=== Chamber ===
- String Quartet No. 1. 1937 (Rochester 1938). 2 violins, viola, cello.
- Musical Escapade "A.W.O.L." 1943. 2 clarinets, double bass.
- Fanfare. 1943, revised 1963 (Toronto 1943). 3 trumpets, 3 trombones, percussion.
- String Quartet No. 2. 1946 (Toronto 1947). 2 violins, viola, cello.
- String Quartet No. 3. 1962 (Toronto 1963). 2 violins, viola, cello.
- Woodwind Quintet. 1964 (Toronto 1965). Flute, oboe, clarinet, French horn, bassoon.
- Clarinet Quartet. 1965 (Toronto/Detroit 1965). 3 clarinets, bass clarinet. Leeds 1970.
- Trialogue (words by Weinzweig). 1971. Soprano, flute, piano.
- Pieces of 5. 1976, revised 1991 (Montreal, 1976). Brass quintet.
- Variations for Louis Applebaum. 1980 (Toronto 1980). Brass quintet.
- Conversations. 1984 (Toronto 1987). 3 guitars.
- Music Centre Serenade. 1984 (Toronto 1984). Flute, horn, viola, cello.
- Jammin'. 1991 (Toronto 1991). Chamber ensemble.
- Interplay: 12 Dialogues. 1998 (Toronto 1999). Piccolo, tuba, piano.

=== Solos, duos ===
- Suite No. 1. 1939 (Toronto 1940). Piano. In: Fourteen Pieces by Canadian Composers, Frederick Harris 1955 (1st movement) and Piano Music II, Canadian Musical Heritage Society, v. 6, 1986 (2nd movement).
- Sonata. 1941 (Toronto 1942). Violin, piano. Oxford University Press 1953.
- Improvisations on an Indian Tune. 1942, revised 1980 (New York 1942). Organ. Excerpt from film score: North West Frontier.
- Intermissions. 1943 (Toronto 1949, CBC broadcast). Flute, oboe. Southern 1964.
- Swing a Fugue. 1949 (Toronto 1987). Piano.
- Melos. 1949 (Toronto 1987). Piano.
- Sonata "Israel." 1949 (Toronto 1950). Cello, piano.
- Sonata. 1950 (Toronto 1951). Cramer 1981. Piano.
- Suite No. 2. 1950 (Toronto 1950, CBC broadcast). Piano. Oxford University Press 1956 (2nd movement), 1965 (1st, 3rd movements).
- Around the Stage in 25 Minutes During Which a Variety of Instruments Are Struck. 1970 (Toronto 1970). Percussion.
- Impromptus: 23 Events. 1973 (Toronto 1974). Piano.
- Riffs. 1974 (Toronto 1974). Flute.
- Contrasts. 1976 (Toronto 1978). Guitar.
- Refrains. 1977 (Toronto 1978). Double bass, piano.
- Eighteen Pieces. 1980 (Toronto 1983). Guitar.
- Fifteen Pieces. 1983 (New York 1984). Harp.
- CanOn Stride. 1986 (1987). Piano. In: Musical Canada: Words and Music Honouring Helmut Kallmann 1988.
- Tango for Two. Piano. 1986 (Toronto 1987); revised for harp, 1987.
- Cadenza. 1986 (Toronto 1988, CBC broadcast). Clarinet.
- Birthday Notes. 1987 (Toronto 1987). Flute, piano.
- Tremologue. 1987 (Toronto 1989). Viola.
- Micromotions. 1988 (Ottawa 1989). Piano.
- Three Pieces. 1989 (North York, 1989). Piano.
- Duologue. 1990 (Toronto 1991). 2 pianos.
- Riffs II. 1991 (Toronto 1992). Trombone.
- Riffs III. 1992. Trumpet.
- Belaria. 1992 (Halifax 1996). Violin, viola or cello.
- Arctic Shadows. 1993. Arrangement from: Edge of the World. Oboe, piano.
- Diversions: Four Pieces for Young Pianists. 1994. Piano.
- Swing Out: Animations and Ruminations on a Double Reed. 1995 (Guelph 1997). Bassoon.
- Duo. 1999 (Toronto 2006). 2 violins.
- Seven Duets. 2000. Piano (4 hands).
- Netscapes. 2000. Piano.
- Swing Time. 2000. Piano.
- Playnotes: Eight Pieces (Arrangement of: Rhapsody for Orchestra). Piano. 2002.

=== Chorus, voice ===
All texts by Weinzweig except To the Lands Over Yonder, Am Yisrael Chai!/Israel Lives! and Dance of Masada.

- To the Lands Over Yonder (Inuit). 1945 (Toronto 1946, CBC broadcast). Chorus: soprano, alto, tenor, bass (SATB). Frederick Harris 1953.
- Of Time, Rain and the World. 1947 (Toronto 1948, CBC broadcast). Voice, piano.
- Dance of Masada (Yitzchak Lamdan). 1951 (Toronto 1952). Baritone, piano.
- Am Yisrael Chai!/Israel Lives! (Malka Lee, English translation by Weinzweig). 1952 (Toronto 1953). SATB, piano. Leeds 1964
- Private Collection. 1975 (Toronto 1977). Soprano, piano.
- Hockey Night in Canada: A Game in Three Periods. 1985 (Toronto 1987). SATB.
- Shoppin' Blues. 1985 (Toronto 1987). SATB.
- Lonesome Satellite. 1985 (Toronto 1987). SSAATTBB.
- Prisoner of Conscience. 1985 (Toronto 1987). SSSAATTTBB.
- On Wings of Song. 1986 (Toronto 1987). SATB.
- What's That? 1986. SATB.
- In the Arms of Morpheus. 1986 (Toronto 1989). SATB.
- Prime Time. 1991, revised 1996 (Toronto 1992). Soprano, baritone, flute, bass clarinet.
- Journey Out of Night: 14 Visions: A Monodrama. 1994 (1994 Toronto). Mezzo, piano.
- Parodies and Travesties: 8 Dialogues. 1995 (Toronto 1998). Soprano, mezzo, piano.
- Le Rendez-vous. 1995. Soprano, mezzo, baritone, piano.
- Walking-Talking. 1996. Soprano, mezzo, tenor, baritone, piano.
- Prologue to a Tango. 2002 (Toronto 2003). Mezzo, 4 violins.

=== Selected writings ===
- "The New Music". Canadian Review of Music and Art. 5. June 1942.
- "A Composer Looks at the Teaching of Musical Theory". Monthly Bulletin. Royal Conservatory of Music of Toronto. November 1949.
- "Notes on a Visit to Britain". Canadian Composer (21, 22). 1967.
- "Address, Report on the John Adaskin Project Policy Conference" (Document). Canadian Music Centre. November 25, 1967.
- "Writings by John Weinzweig". Canada Music Book. Vol. 6. Spring–Summer 1973. Edited by R. and S. Henninger.
- "Vancouver Symposium 1950, Canadian League of Composers". Newsletter (1). September 1980.
- "A Wry Look at Our Music". Canadian Composer (175). October 1982.
- John Weinzweig: His Words and His Music. Grimsby, Ontario. 1986.
- "The Making of a Composer". Canadian Composer (211). May 1986.
- "Canadian Music of the 1930s and 1940s". Canadian Musician Handbooks. Vol. 2. Kingston, Ontario. 1987.Edited by Beverley Cavanagh.
- "The Diary of a Song...Hockey Night in Canada". Canadian Composer (224). October 1989.
- Sounds and Reflections. Grimsby, Ontario, 1990.
- "The Creation of the Canadian League of Composers: A Recollection". Notations. 3 (2). Canadian Music Centre. April 1991.

== Bibliography ==
- Beckwith, John (1997). "John Weinzweig at Seventy". Music Papers: Articles and Talks by a Canadian Composer. Ottawa: Golden Dog Press. pp. 179–94. ISBN 978-0-919614-72-7.
- Beckwith, John; Cherney, Brian, eds. (2011). Weinzweig: Essays on His Life and Music. Waterloo: Wilfrid Laurier University Press.
- Bradley, Ian L. (1977). "John Weinzweig: Composer, Professor, Conductor". Twentieth Century Canadian Composers. Victoria: University of Victoria. pp. 68–97. ISBN 978-0-88874-052-6.
- Henninger, Richard (1995). "Weinzweig, John". In Sadie, Stanley (ed.). The New Grove Dictionary of Music and Musicians. London: Macmillan. pp. 318–19.
- Kallmann, Helmut (1974). "Weinzweig, John". In Vinton, John (ed.). Dictionary of Contemporary Music. New York, NY: Dutton. pp. 812–13.
- Keillor, Elaine (1994). John Weinzweig and his Music – The Radical Romantic of Canada. Metuchen, NJ: Scarecrow Press. ISBN 978-0-8108-2849-0.
- Lind, Stephanie Kathleen (2003). John Weinzweig's Woodwind Quartet: A Study in Compositional Development and Serial Methods (M.A., Music). University of British Columbia.
- MacMillan, Ernest (1997). Morey, Carl (ed.). MacMillan on Music: Essays on Music. Toronto: Dundurn Press.
- McGee, Timothy J. (1985). "Recent Developments". The Music of Canada. New York: Norton. pp. 104–40.
- Proctor, George A. (1980). Canadian Music of the Twentieth Century. Toronto: University of Toronto Press.
- Schafer, R. Murray (1984). "A Birthday Tribute for John Weinzweig". On Canadian Music. Bancroft: Arcana Editions. pp. 60–61.
- Scheffer, Erin (2019). John Weinzweig and the Canadian Mediascape, 1941-1948 (Ph.D., Music). University of Toronto.
- Such, Peter (1972). "John Weinzweig". Soundprints: Contemporary Composers. Toronto: Clarke, Irwin. pp. 2–29. ISBN 978-0-7720-0564-9.
- Steenhuisen, Paul (2009). "John Weinzweig". Sonic Mosaics: Conversations with Composers. Edmonton: University of Alberta Press. pp. 46–55. ISBN 978-0-88864-474-9.
- Sumner, Carolyne (2016). "Radical Socialism, Simplified Serialism: John Weinzweig and CBC Wartime Radio Drama during the Second World War" (PDF). Les Cahiers de la Société québécoise de recherche en musique. 17 (2): 49–60. doi:10.7202/1052739ar – via Érudit.
- Wolters, Benita (1999). The Early Years of the Canadian League of Composers (M.A., Music). University of British Columbia.
