= Canadian League of Composers =

The Canadian League of Composers (CLC) is an organization formed in 1951 of Canadian composers primarily interested in raising awareness and acceptance of Canadian music. Its activities are overseen and directed by an executive, and by a National Council, a 12-member elected board that aims to equally represent all regions of Canada. The league is funded by the SOCAN Foundation, annual member dues, and public donations.

== Formation ==
In 1951, John Weinzweig met with fellow composers Harry Somers and Samuel Dolin to discuss the status of professional composers in Canada. They wished to raise awareness and acceptance of Canadian music, to be listened to and taken seriously. They contacted around a dozen other Canadian composers who shared their desires, and within a year had acquired a federal charter as the Canadian League of Composers (CLC), of which Weinzweig was the first president. Though the original members were all from within Weinzweig's circle, the idea of the CLC was to bring composers together to work for a common cause, not to achieve a uniform national style. This mindset was much like that of the Group of Seven, 30 years earlier in Canadian art. After several decades, national membership had grown to around 300 people and continued to grow steadily throughout the century.

== Endeavors ==
The first project the League undertook was to sponsor public concerts featuring new Canadian compositions. They featured many different kinds of repertoire, including orchestral works, chamber music and opera, but lacked the support of many established performing groups. Despite this, about 30 concerts of exclusively Canadian music occurred between 1951 and 1960. The first, on May 16, 1951, was a program of entirely Weinzweig's music. It was jointly held with the Canadian Broadcasting Corporation (CBC) and the Royal Conservatory of Music (RCM) of Toronto, and received a favourable review by the art critic for The Globe and Mail.

The league next took on the task of editing an anthology of new piano repertoire. A small library was created of scores by many members, for the use of interested conductors and performers.

In 1960 the CLC organized the International Conference of Composers as part of the Stratford Music Festival. It drew composers from 30 countries, including Krenek, Varèse and Berio.

Front Row Insurance Brokers Inc. has initiated an online musical instrument insurance program for members of various Canadian music associations, including the CLC.

== Bibliography ==
- Beckwith, John (1997). Music Papers: Articles and Talks by a Canadian Composer. Ottawa, Ontario: The Golden Dog Press.
- Proctor, George A. (1951). Canadian Music of the Twentieth Century. Toronto, Ontario: University of Toronto Press.
