= Canadian Music Centre =

Arts organization in Toronto, Canada

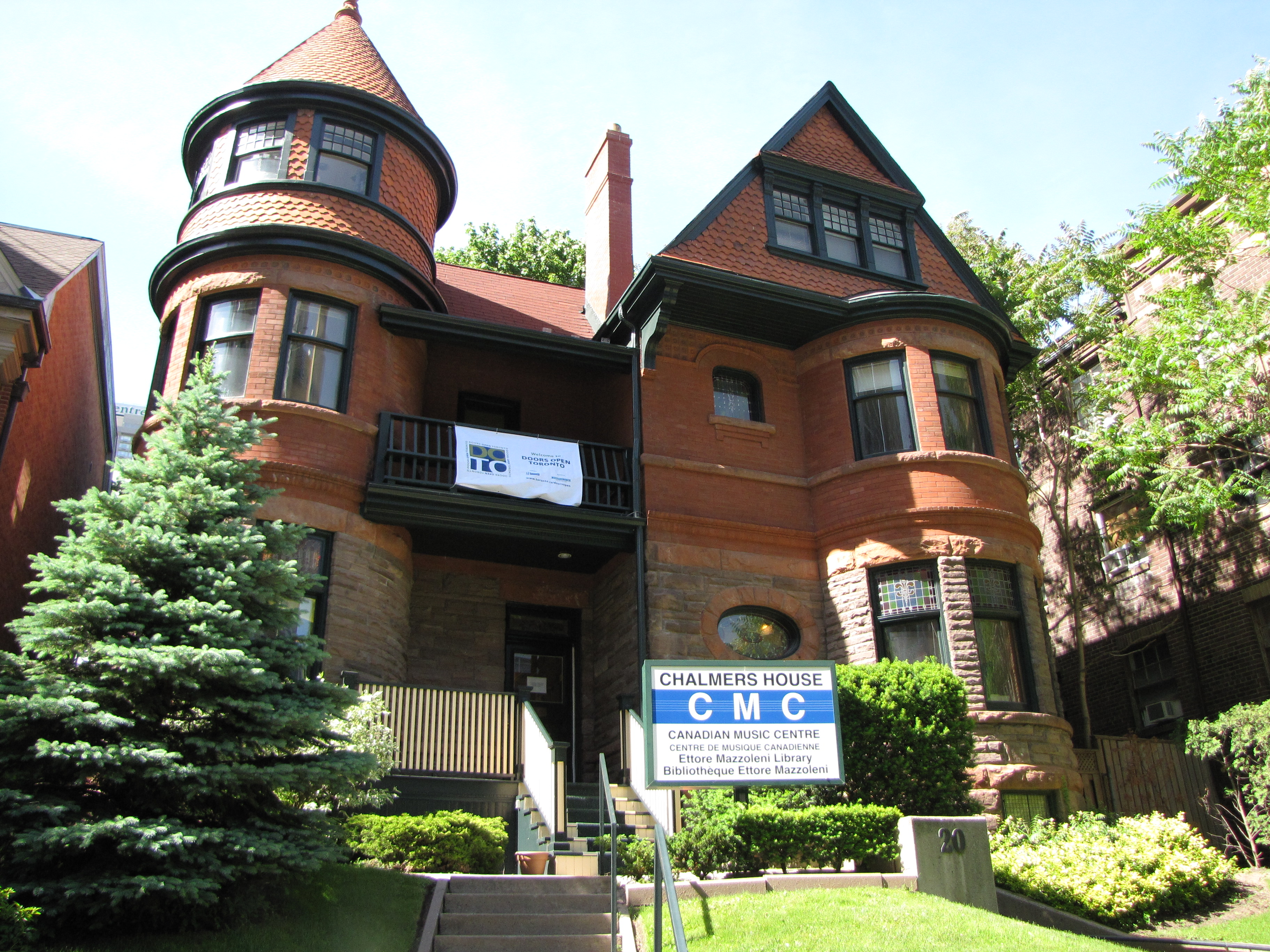
- Chalmers House in Toronto
- Interactive map of Canadian Music Centre
- Address: Chalmers House; 20 St Joseph St; Toronto ON M4Y 1J9
- Location: Calgary, Montreal, Toronto, and Vancouver
- Coordinates: 43°39′57.5″N 79°23′11.5″W
- Capacity: 50
- Event: Canadian music

The Canadian Music Centre was founded in 1959 by a group of Canadian composers who saw a need to create a repository for Canadian music. It now holds Canada's largest collection of Canadian concert music, and works to promote the music of its Associate Composers in Canada and around the world.

Initially the centre focused on collecting and cataloguing serious musical works, developing a catalogue of scores, copying and duplicating the music, and making it available for loan, nationally and internationally. The centre currently has over 18,000 scores and/or works by almost 700 Canadian contemporary composers available through its lending library. It sells more than 900 CD titles featuring the music of its Associate Composers and other Canadian independent recording producers.

The centre is digitizing all of its scores and works. It offers an on-demand printing and binding service, music repertoire consultations, and is easily accessible through its five regional centres across Canada, and its website. It has a number of national outreach projects, conducts research, and administers several awards.

The Ann Southam Audio Archive, administered by the CMC, is the largest collection of recorded Canadian concert works in the world. It can be accessed through Centrestreams, CMC's free streaming service, via its website.

In 1981, the centre established the Centrediscs recording label, the only label devoted to Canadian concert music. It has received numerous awards, including six JUNOs, an East Coast Music Award, six West Coast Music Awards, and two Grande Prix du Disque Canada.

Today the CMC has a national office in Toronto, ON, and regional centres in:

- Victoria, BC – 900 Johnson Street (part of the Victoria Conservatory of Music complex)
- Vancouver, BC – 837 Davie Street
- Calgary, AB – at the University of Calgary music library
- Toronto, ON – Chalmers House, 20 St. Joseph Street
- Montreal, QC – 2150 Crescent Street
- Halifax, NS – at Dalhousie University

The CMC's locations are increasingly becoming spaces for performances and workshops.
