= London Going out of Town – or The March of Bricks & Mortar! =

Satirical print by George Cruikshank

- Artist: George Cruikshank
- Year: 1829
- Type: Satirical print, etching
- Location: Various prints, including in British Museum, London

London Going out of Town – or The March of Bricks & Mortar! is an 1829 etching by caricaturist and illustrator George Cruikshank.

== Background ==
The etching is part of Cruikshank's series entitled Scraps and Sketches. The series is a collection of images published by Cruikshank in annual volumes between 1828 and 1832 depicting miscellaneous scenes, of which London Going out of Town is generally considered the most well-known. Various prints of the etching exist, with examples in the collection of the British Museum and Ashmolean Museum in Oxford.

At the time, Cruikshank was living on Amwell Street, part of the New River Estate which was in the process of development. The street itself was laid out beginning in 1824, while Cruikshank had been living on nearby Claremont Square.

In 18th- and 19th-century Britain, phrases like "London is going out of town" or "all London is out of town" were used to describe the period at the end of the social season when members of the social elite migrated to their country estates, leaving the metropolis supposedly empty, despite millions of ordinary working-class residents remaining.

== Description ==
The print represents the general rapid expansion of London in the early 19th century, a scene which was visible to Cruikshank from his own window. Lament for the damage which urban expansion had been causing to the countryside was common at the time within prose and poetry, but Cruikshank's work is unique in portraying it with visual arts.

The print contrasts the fields of Hampstead, shown in the right of the scene, with the city, St Paul's Cathedral visible through smoke on the left. In the smoke at the top can be read the words "BEHOLD BUILDING". Factories and kilns are shown firing smoke and bricks at trees, cows and haystacks while army of anthropomorphic bricks and mortar march across the landscape. One holds a sign reading "This ground to be lett on a building lease. Enquire of Mr. Goth, Brickmaker, Bricklayers Arms, Brick Lane, Brixton". A number of puns are also spoken by characters throughout the scene.

== See also ==
- The Allied Bakers
- The Corsican Shuttlecock
- Twelfth Night
