= George Cruikshank =

British caricaturist and book illustrator (1792–1878)

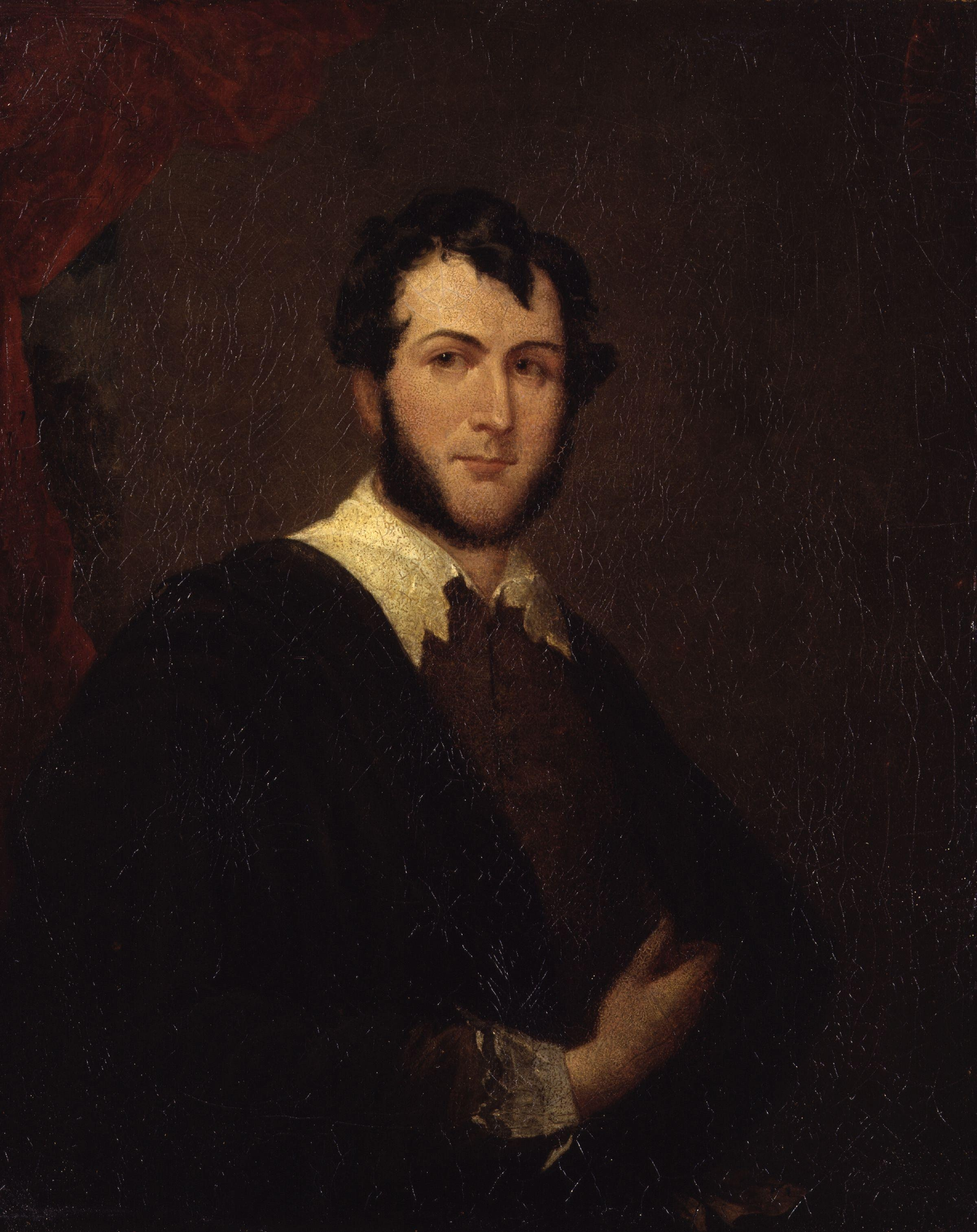
- 1836 portrait
- Born: 27 September 1792; London, England
- Died: 1 February 1878 (aged 85); London, England
- Known for: Cartoonist (caricaturist), children's literature
- Spouses: Mary Ann Walker (m. 1827; died 1849) Eliza Widdison (m. 1851)
- Partner: Adelaide Attree
- Children: 11
- Parent(s): Isaac Cruikshank; Mary MacNaughton
- Relatives: Isaac Robert Cruikshank (brother)

George Cruikshank or Cruickshank (/ˈkrʊkʃæŋk/ KRUUK-shank; 27 September 1792 – 1 February 1878) was an English caricaturist and book illustrator, praised as the "modern Hogarth" during his life. His book illustrations for his friend Charles Dickens, and many other authors, reached an international audience.

== Early life ==
Cruikshank was born in London. His father, Edinburgh-born Isaac Cruikshank, was one of the leading caricaturists of the late 1790s and Cruikshank started his career as his father's apprentice and assistant. His older brother, Isaac Robert, also followed in the family business as a caricaturist and illustrator.

Cruikshank's early work was caricature; but in 1823, at the age of 31, he started to focus on book illustration. He illustrated the first, 1823 English translation (by Edgar Taylor and David Jardine) of Grimms' Fairy Tales, published in two volumes as German Popular Stories.

On 16 October 1827, he married Mary Ann Walker (1807–1849). Two years after her death, on 7 March 1851, he married Eliza Widdison. The two lived at 263 Hampstead Road, north London.

Cruikshank had fathered 11 illegitimate children with a mistress named Adelaide Attree, his former servant, who lived close to where he lived with his wife. Adelaide was ostensibly married and had taken the married surname 'Archibold'.

== Sociopolitical caricatures and illustrations ==
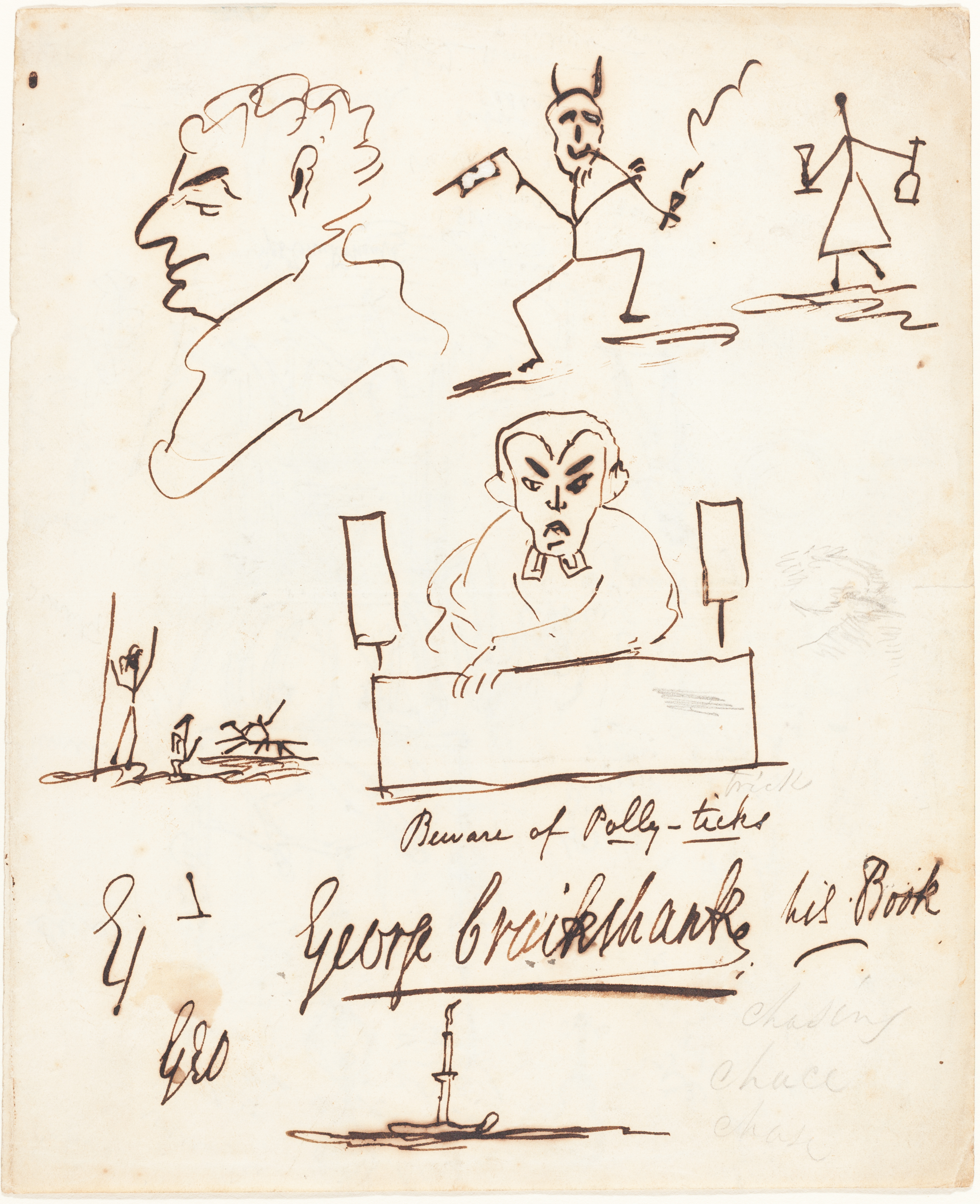
Satirical Sketches, National Gallery of Art

Cruikshank's early career was renowned for his social caricatures of English life for popular publications. He achieved early success collaborating with William Hone in his political satire The Political House That Jack Built (1819). In the same year he produced the now-infamous anti-abolitionist piece The New Union Club. It satirised a dinner party organised by abolitionists with black guests. While this piece was praised as "the finest of G.C.'s caricatures" during the 19th century, it is now viewed as one of the most racist prints of its era. His 1819 print, The Belle Alliance, or the Female Reformers of Blackburn!!!, criticised the role of women in the reform movement, portraying them as unfeminine and grotesque.

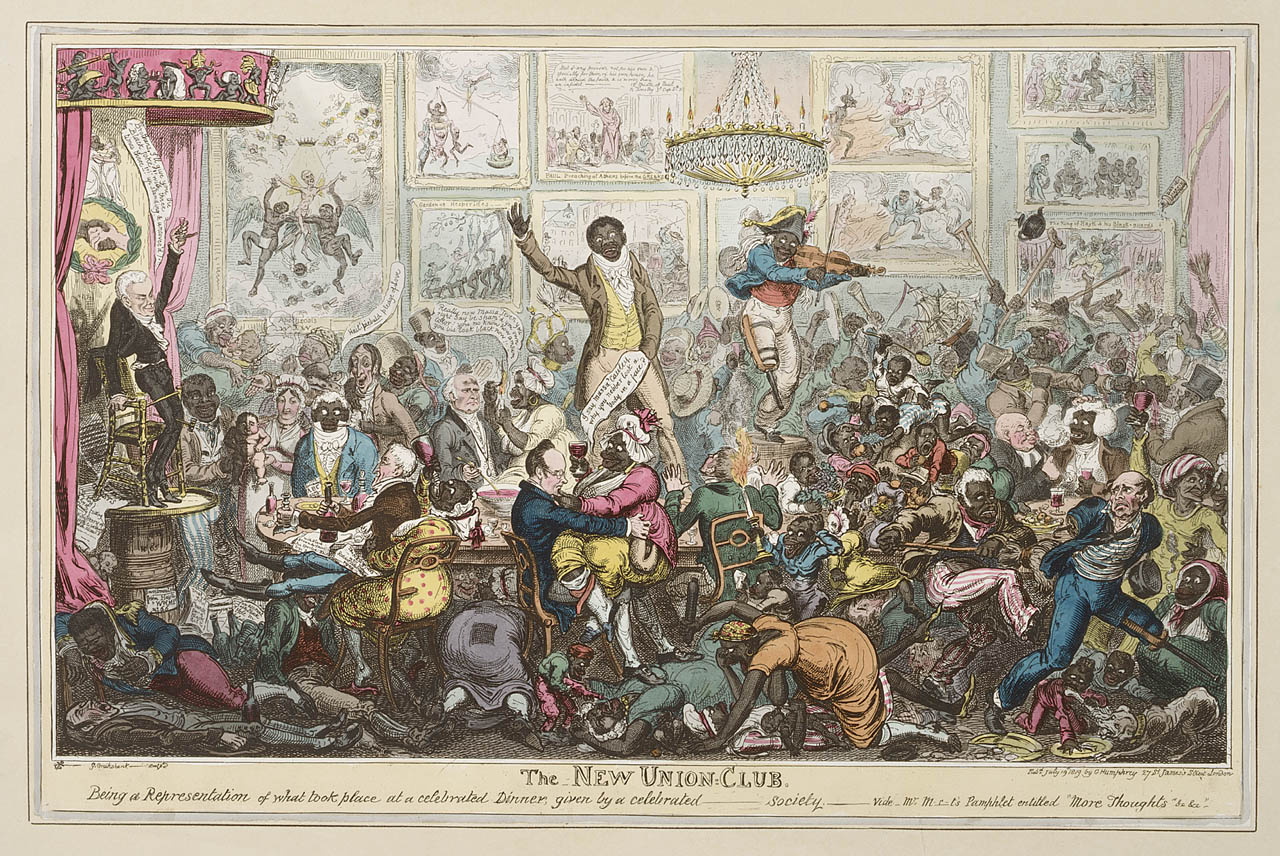
The New Union Club dinner with black guests

His first major work was Pierce Egan's Life in London (1821) in which the characters Tom and Jerry, two 'men about town' visit various London locations and taverns to enjoy themselves and carouse. This was followed by The Comic Almanack (1835–1853) and Omnibus (1842). Cruikshank gained notoriety with his political prints that attacked the royal family and leading politicians. In 1820 he received a royal bribe of £100 for a pledge "not to caricature His Majesty" (George IV) "in any immoral situation". His work included a personification of England named John Bull who was developed from about 1790 in conjunction with other British satirical artists such as James Gillray, and Thomas Rowlandson.

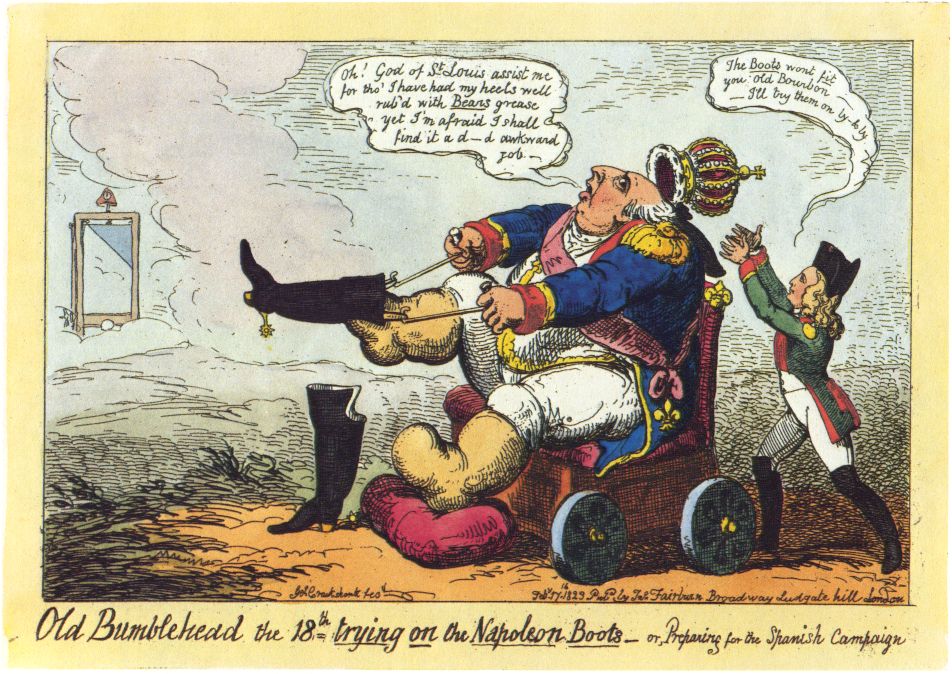
Old Bumblehead the 18th trying on Napoleon Boots 1823

Cruikshank replaced one of his major influences, James Gillray, as England's most popular satirist. For a generation he delineated Tories, Whigs and Radicals impartially. Satirical material came to him from every public event – wars abroad, the enemies of Britain (he was highly patriotic), the frolic, among other qualities, such as the weird and terrible, in which he excelled. His hostility to enemies of Britain and a crude racism is evident in his illustrations commissioned to accompany William Maxwell's History of the Irish rebellion in 1798 (1845) where his lurid depictions of incidents in the rebellion were characterised by the simian-like portrayal of Irish rebels. Among the other racially engaged works of Cruikshank there were caricatures about the "legal barbarities" of the Chinese, the subject given by his friend, Dr. W. Gourley, a participant in the ideological battle around the Arrow War, 1856–60.

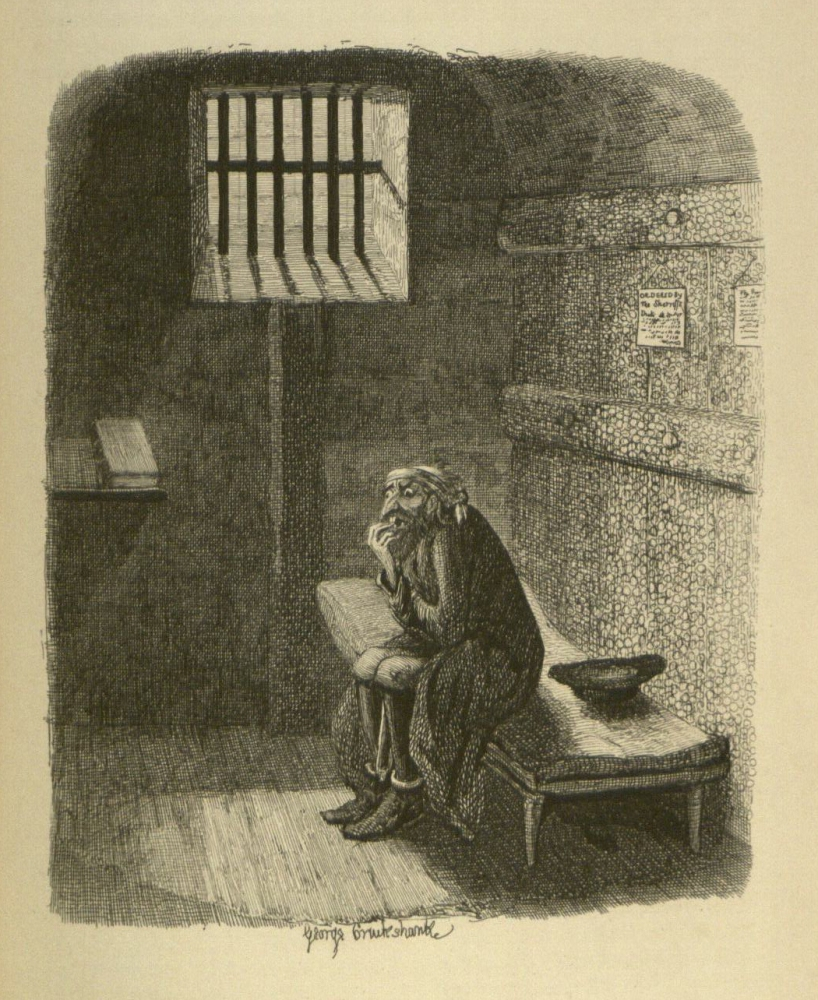
Fagin in his cell. Etching, 1838

== Charles Dickens ==
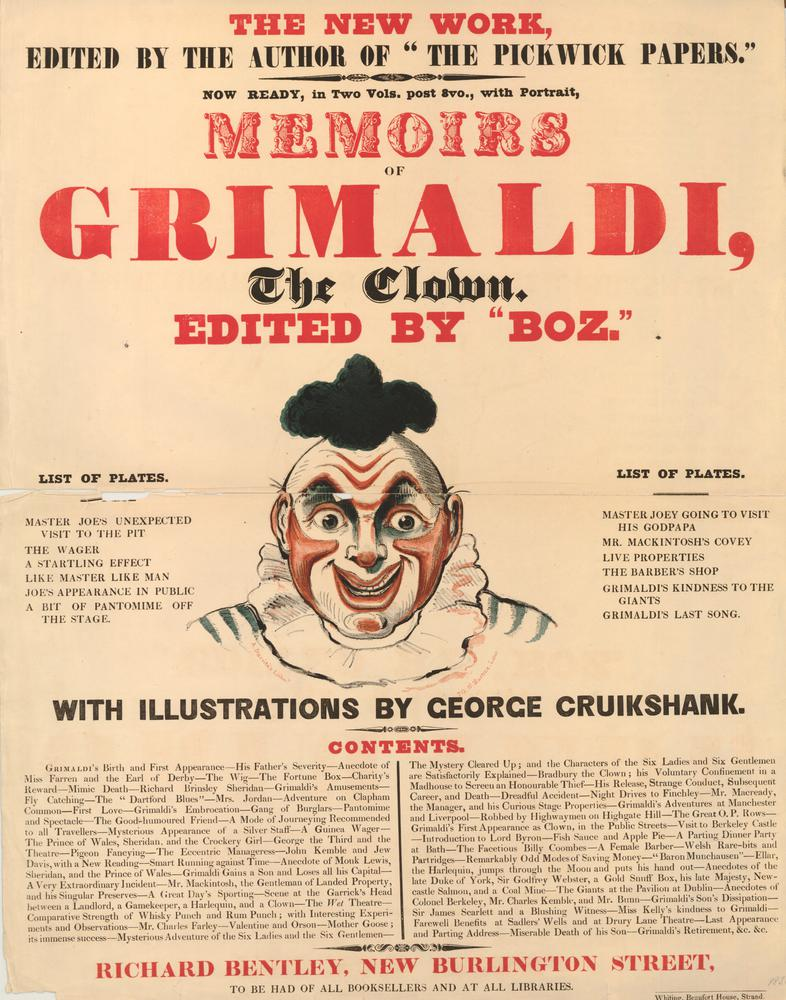
1838 poster advertisement for Memoirs of Grimaldi

For Charles Dickens, Cruikshank illustrated Sketches by Boz (1836), The Mudfog Papers (1837–38) and Oliver Twist (1838). He also illustrated Memoirs of Joseph Grimaldi (1838), which Dickens edited under his regular nom de plume, "Boz". Cruikshank even acted in Dickens's amateur theatrical company.

On 30 December 1871, Cruikshank published a letter in The Times which claimed credit for much of the plot of Oliver Twist. The letter launched a fierce controversy around who created the work. Cruikshank was not the first Dickens illustrator to make such a claim. Robert Seymour who illustrated the Pickwick Papers suggested that the idea for that novel was originally his; however, in his preface to the 1867 edition, Dickens strenuously denied any specific input.

The friendship between Cruikshank and Dickens soured further when Cruikshank became a fanatical teetotaler in opposition to Dickens's views of moderation.

In Somerset Maugham's short story "Miss King", Cruickshank's influence is referenced:

She wore a large white cotton nightcap (on entering Ashenden has noticed the brown wig on a stand on the dressing-table) tied under the chin and a white voluminous nightdress that came high up in the neck. Nightcap and nightdress belonged to a past age and reminded you of Cruickshank's illustrations to the novels of Charles Dickens.

== Temperance and the Volunteers ==
In the late 1840s, Cruikshank's focus shifted from book illustration to an emphasis on alcohol temperance and anti-smoking. Formerly a heavy drinker, he now supported, lectured to, and supplied illustrations for the National Temperance Society and the Total Abstinence Society, among others. The best known of these are The Bottle, 8 plates (1847), with its sequel, The Drunkard's Children, 8 plates (1848), with the ambitious work, The Worship of Bacchus, published by subscription after the artist's oil painting, now in the Tate Gallery, London. For his efforts, he was made vice president of the National Temperance League in 1856.

When the invasion scare of 1859 led to the creation of the Volunteer Movement, Cruikshank was one of those who organised Rifle Volunteer Corps (RVCs). At first his unit was the 24th Surrey RVC, which recruited from working men who were total abstainers and was named 'Havelock's Own' in honour of Major-General Sir Henry Havelock, a hero of the Indian Mutiny and pioneer of Temperance Clubs in the army.

However, Cruikshank received little encouragement from the Lord-Lieutenant of Surrey, and was rebuked for crossing into Kent to recruit. Disgusted, he disbanded his unit in 1862 and began anew in Middlesex, organising the 48th Middlesex RVC (Havelock's Temperance Volunteers). The unit ran into financial difficulties and when Cruikshank was forced to retire due to age, he was replaced as commanding officer by Lt-Col Cuthbert Vickers, a wealthy shipowner. However, the Bath Chronicle and Weekly Gazette of 3 September 1868 reported that Cruikshank had resigned as Lieutenant-Colonel of the Volunteers "in consequence, it is said, of the reinstatement in the service of certain officers of his corps who some time since had a difference with their Lieutenant-Colonel and were cashiered".

The 48th Middlesex merged with the 2nd City of London RVC, also a working-men's unit, composed mainly of printers from the Fleet Street area, and the combined unit had a long history as the City of London Rifles.

== Later years ==
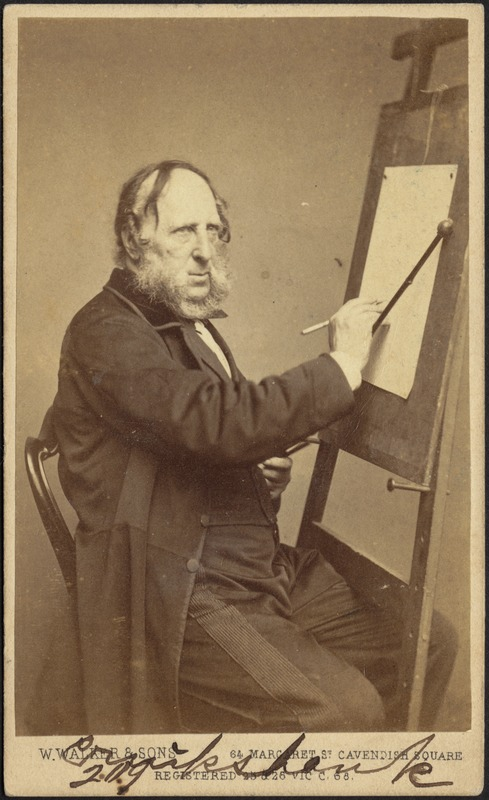
Cruikshank c. 1859–1870

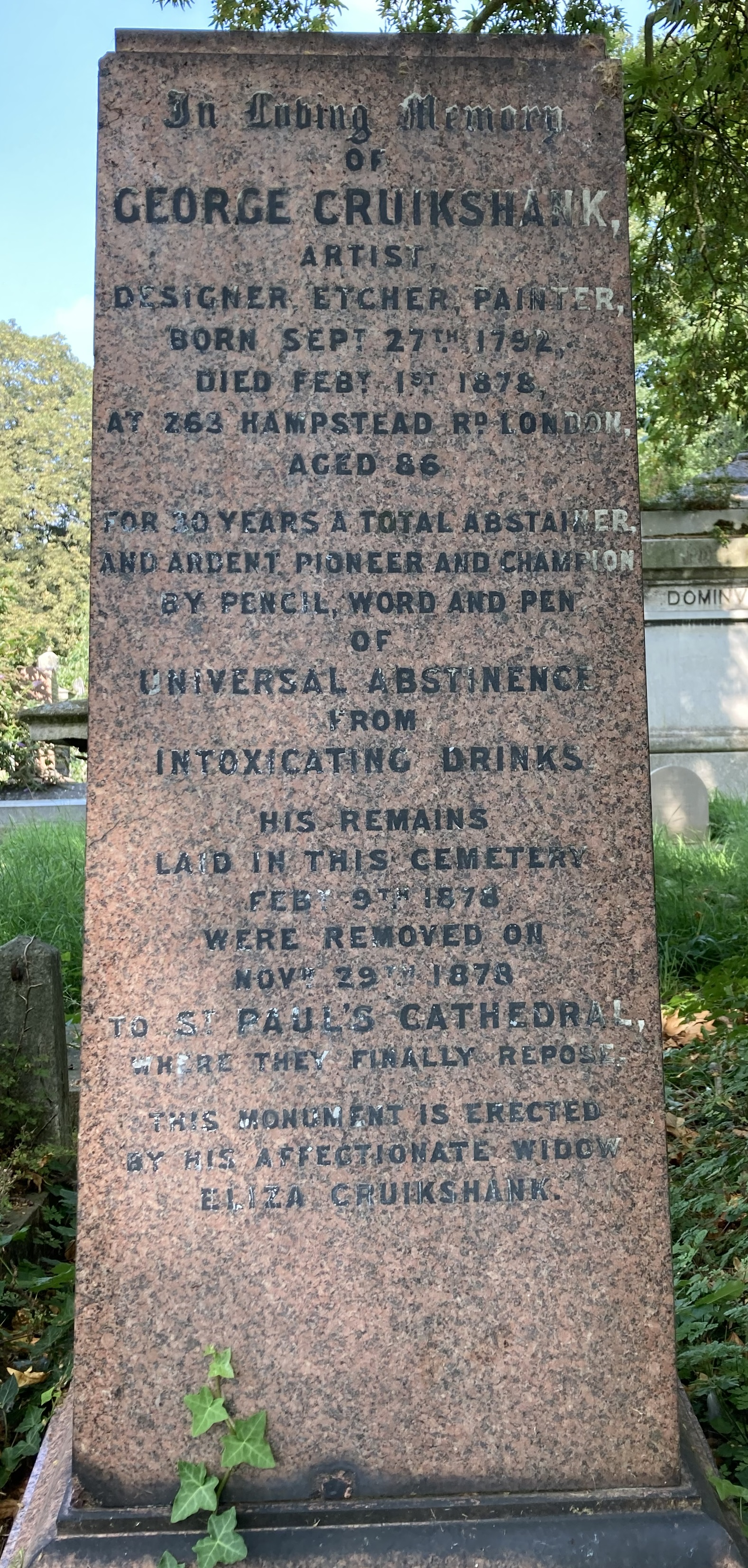
Memorial to George Cruikshank in Kensal Green Cemetery

After he developed palsy in later life, Cruikshank's health and work began to decline in quality. He died on 1 February 1878 and was originally buried in Kensal Green Cemetery. In November 1878 his remains were exhumed and reburied in St. Paul's Cathedral. Punch magazine, which presumably did not know of his large illegitimate family, said in its obituary: "There never was a purer, simpler, more straightforward or altogether more blameless man. His nature had something childlike in its transparency."

In his lifetime he created nearly 10,000 prints, illustrations, and plates. There are collections of his works in the British Museum and the Victoria and Albert Museum. A Royal Society of Arts blue plaque commemorates Cruikshank at 293 Hampstead Road in Camden Town.

== Samples of his work ==
The Life and Opinions of Tristram Shandy, Gentleman

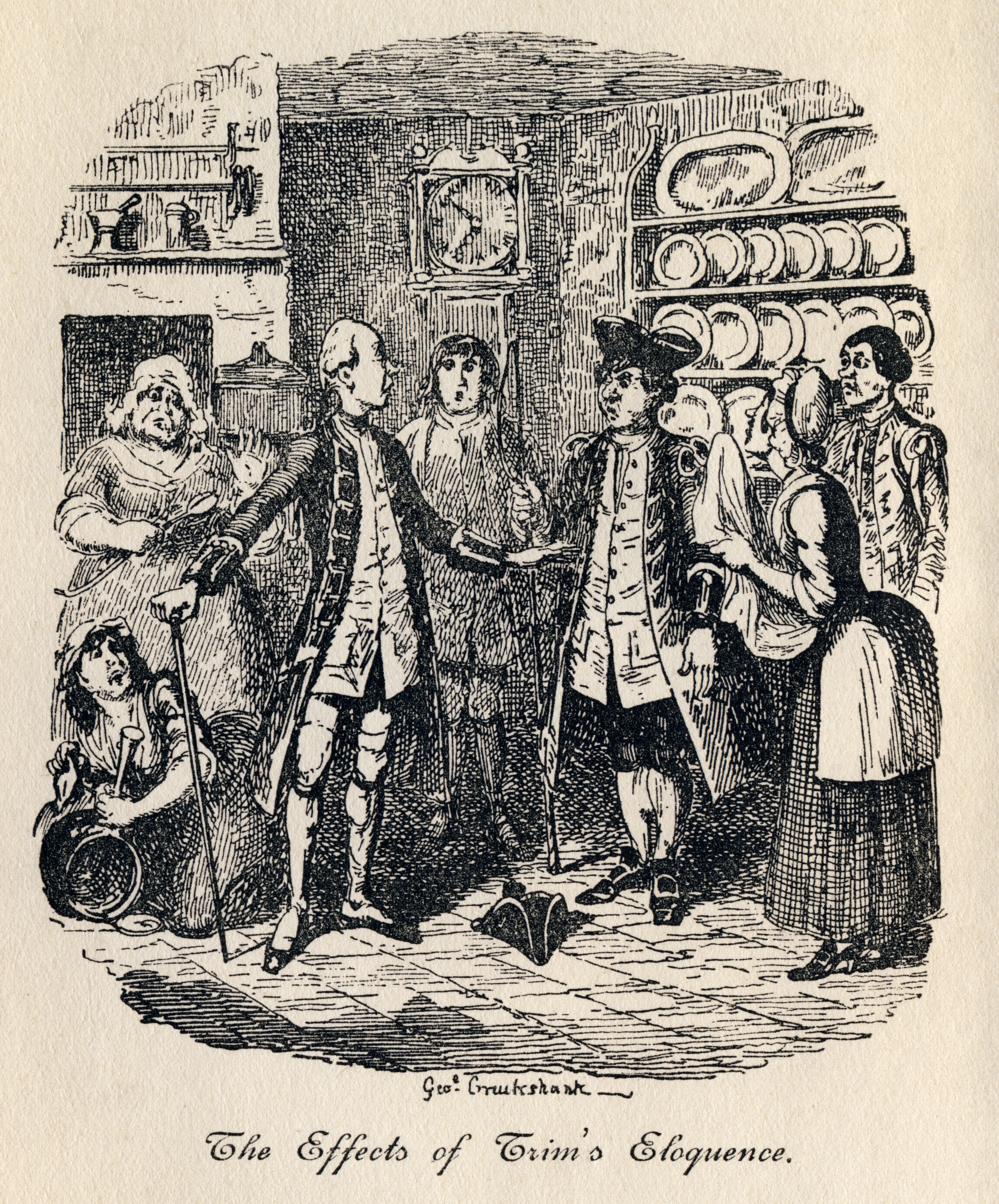
Plate I

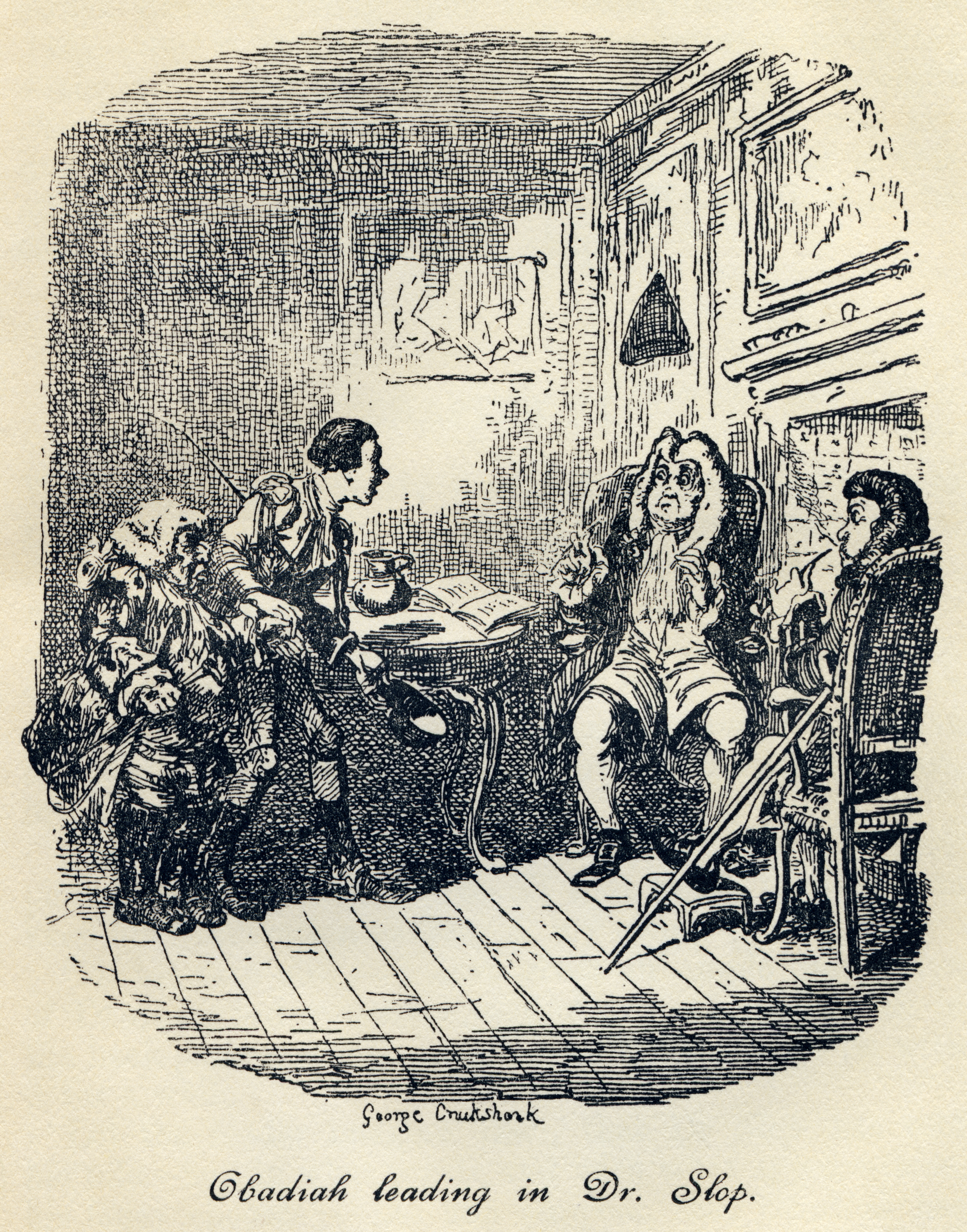
Plate II

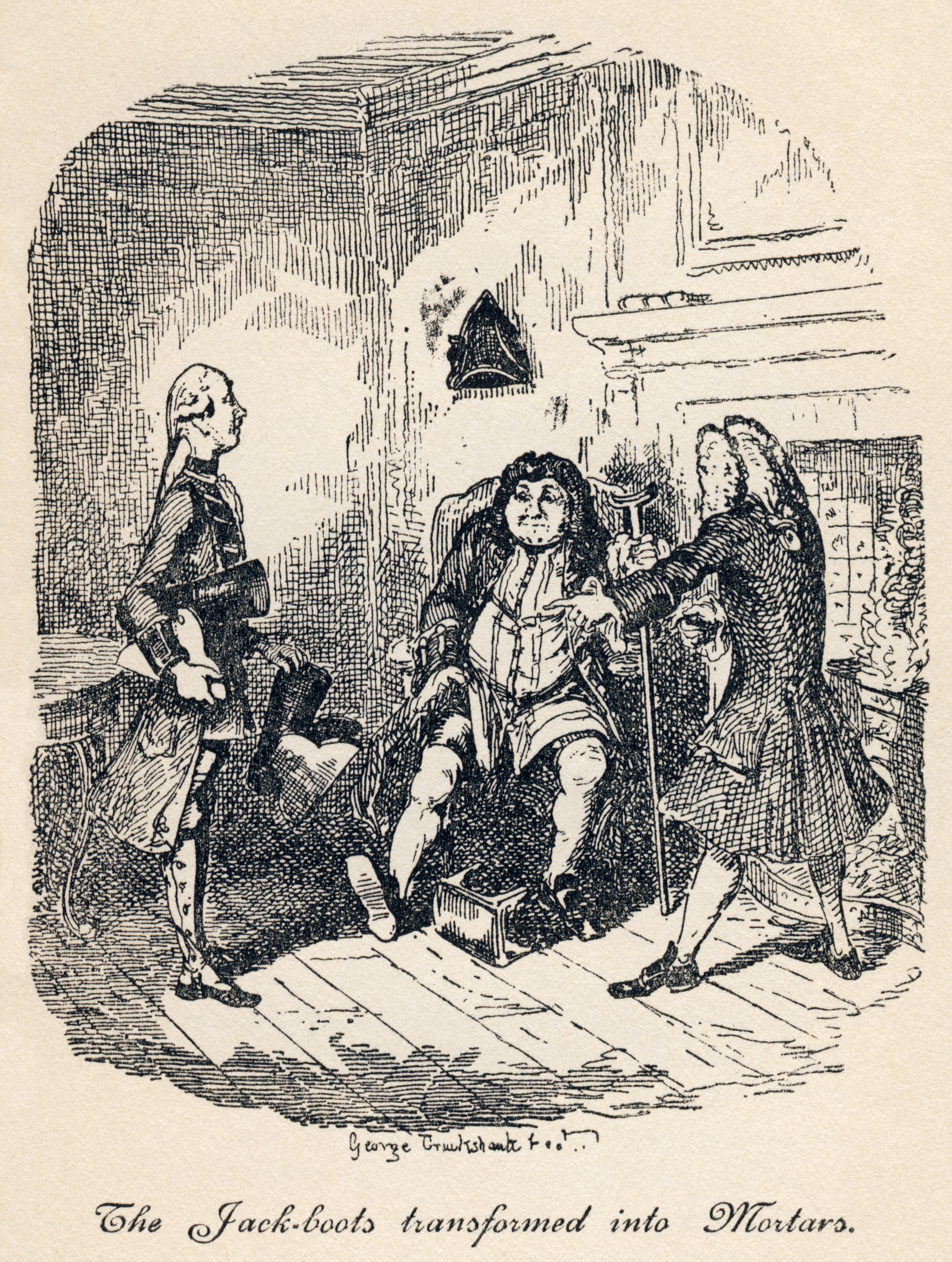
Plate III

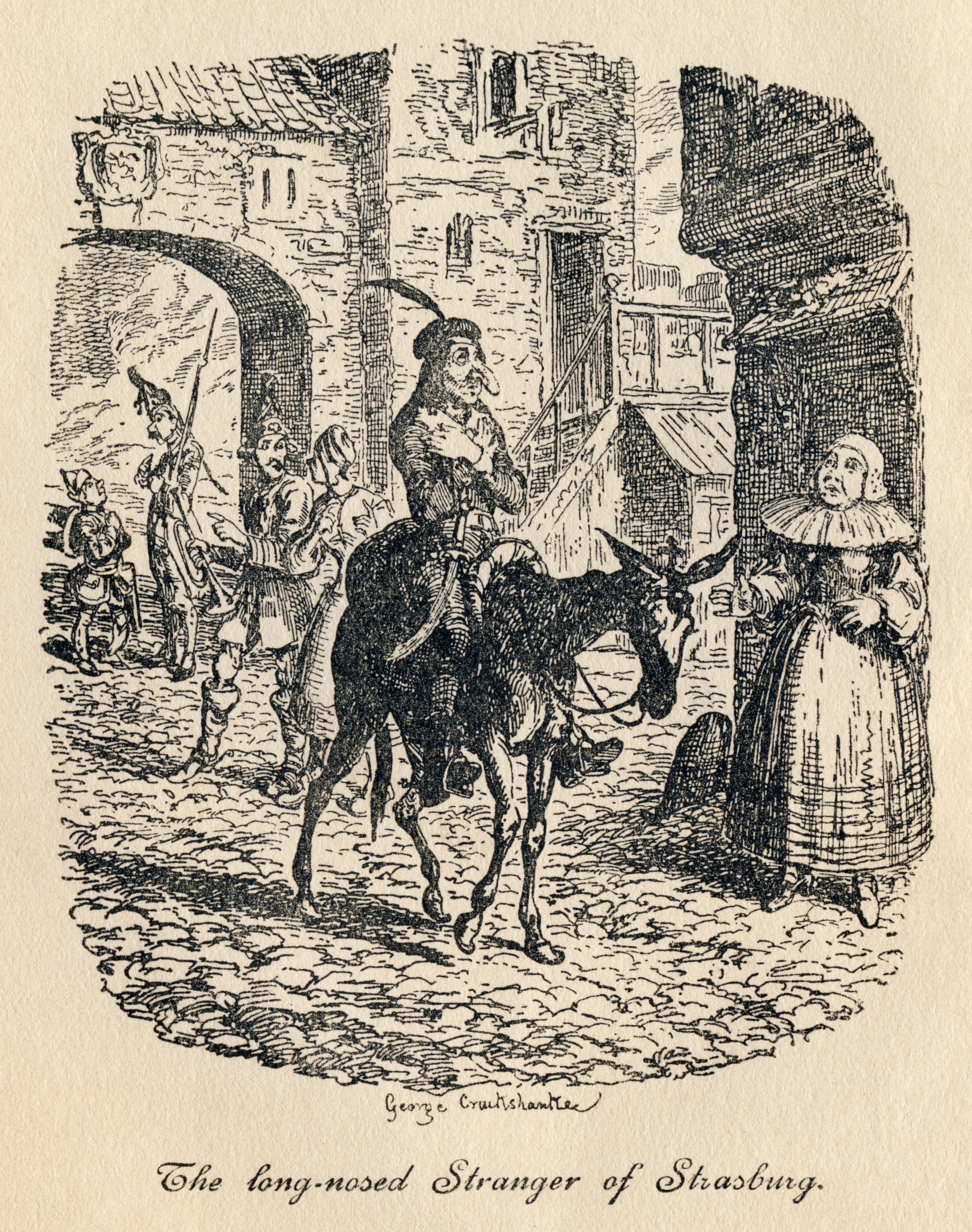
Plate IV

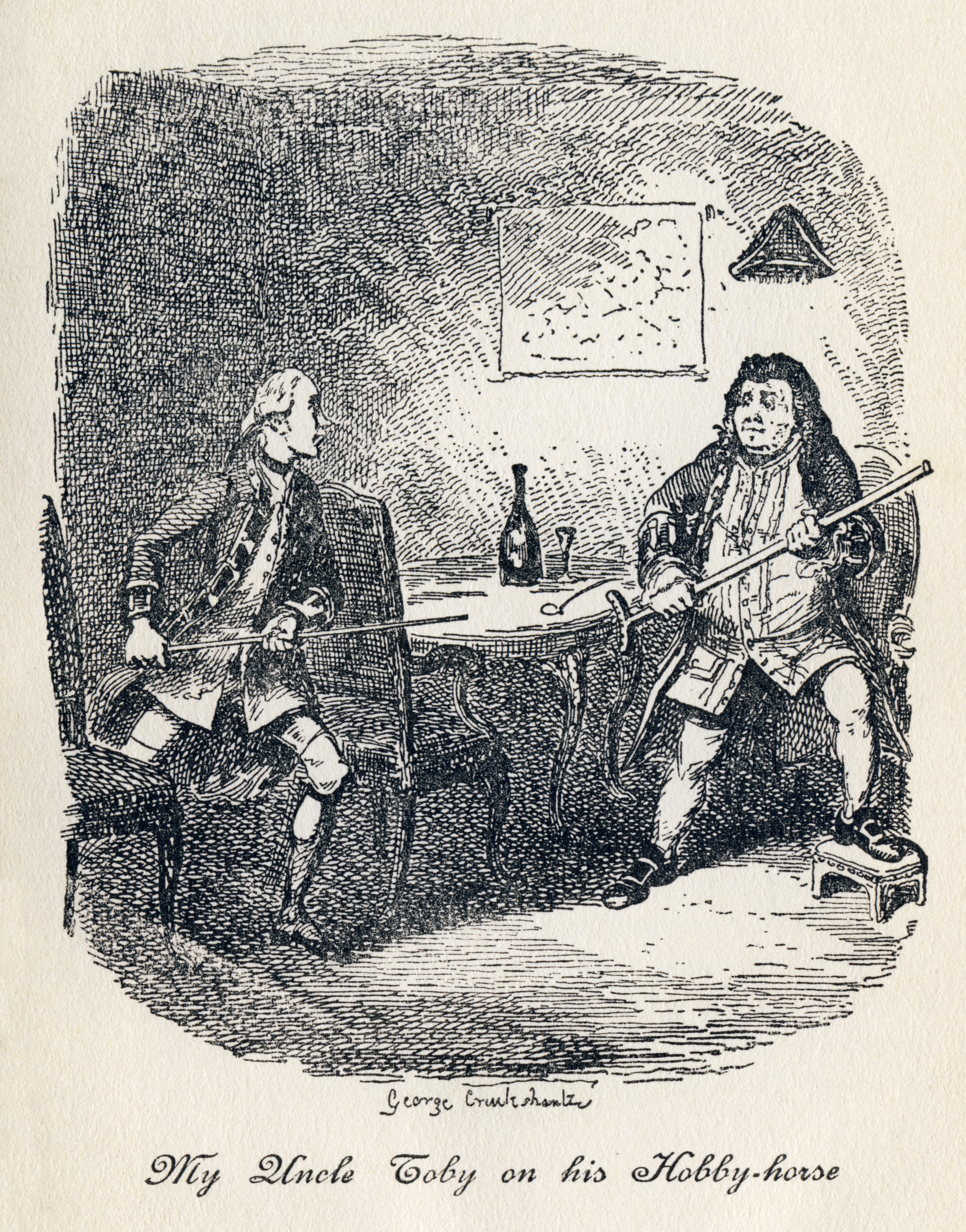
Plate V

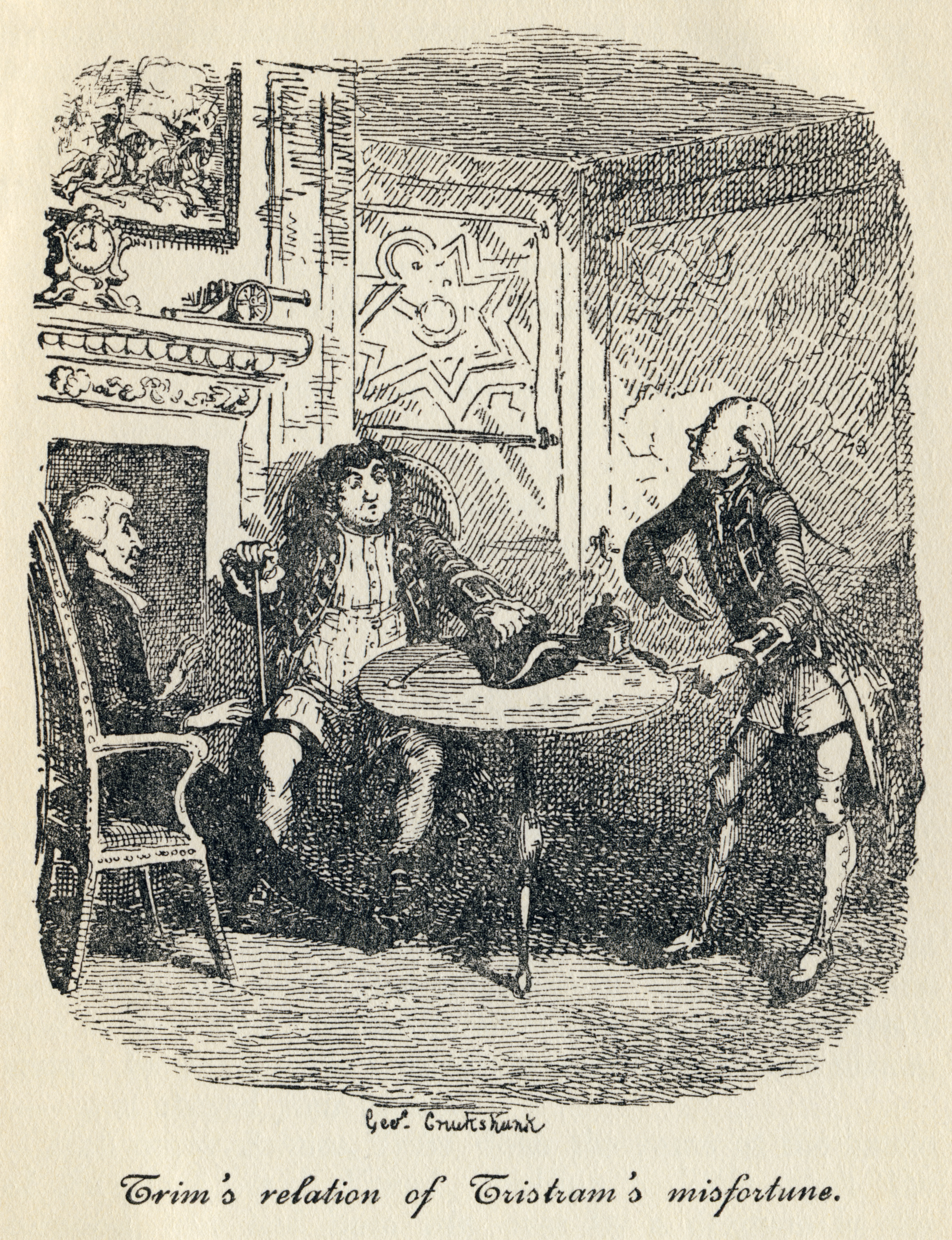
Plate VI

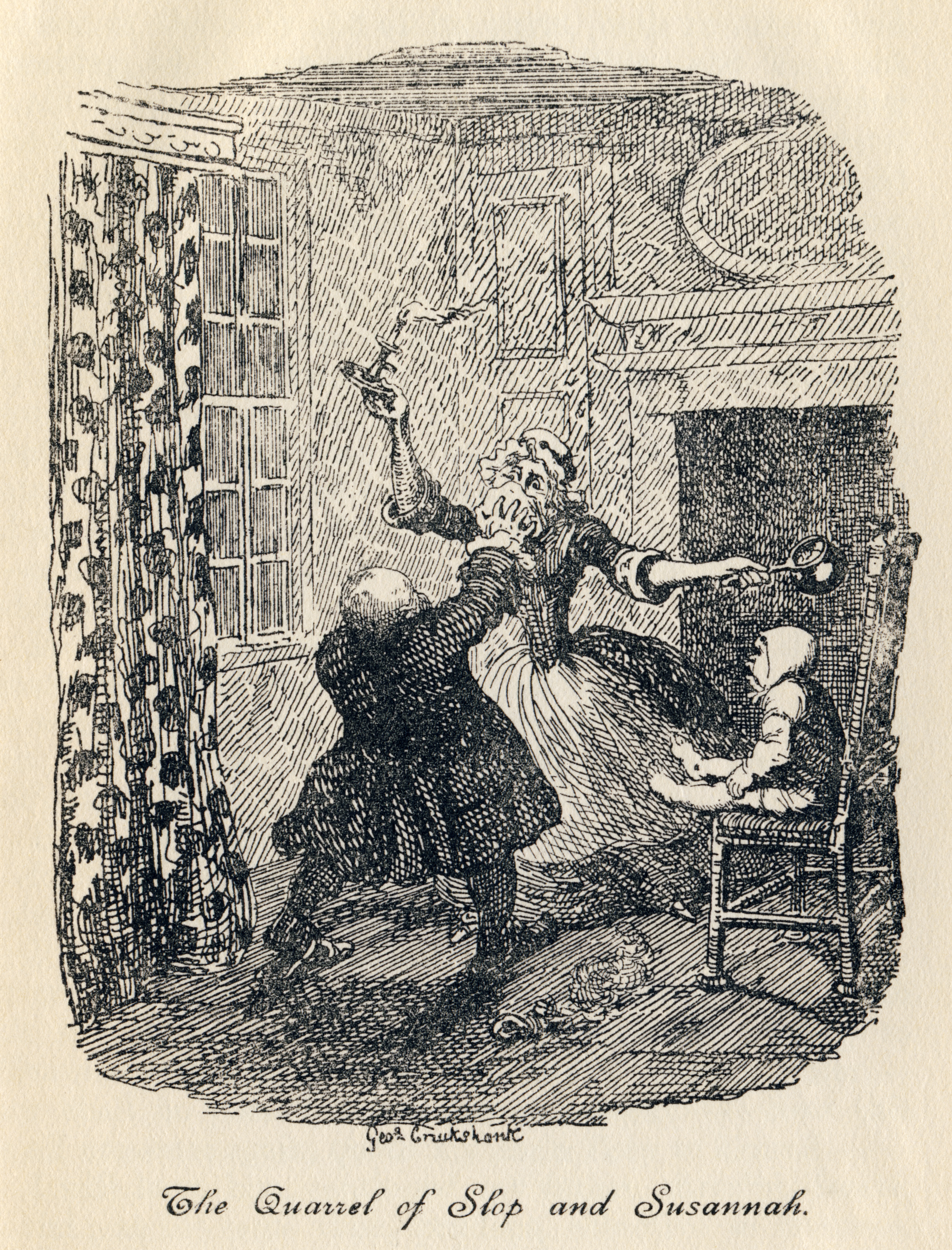
Plate VII

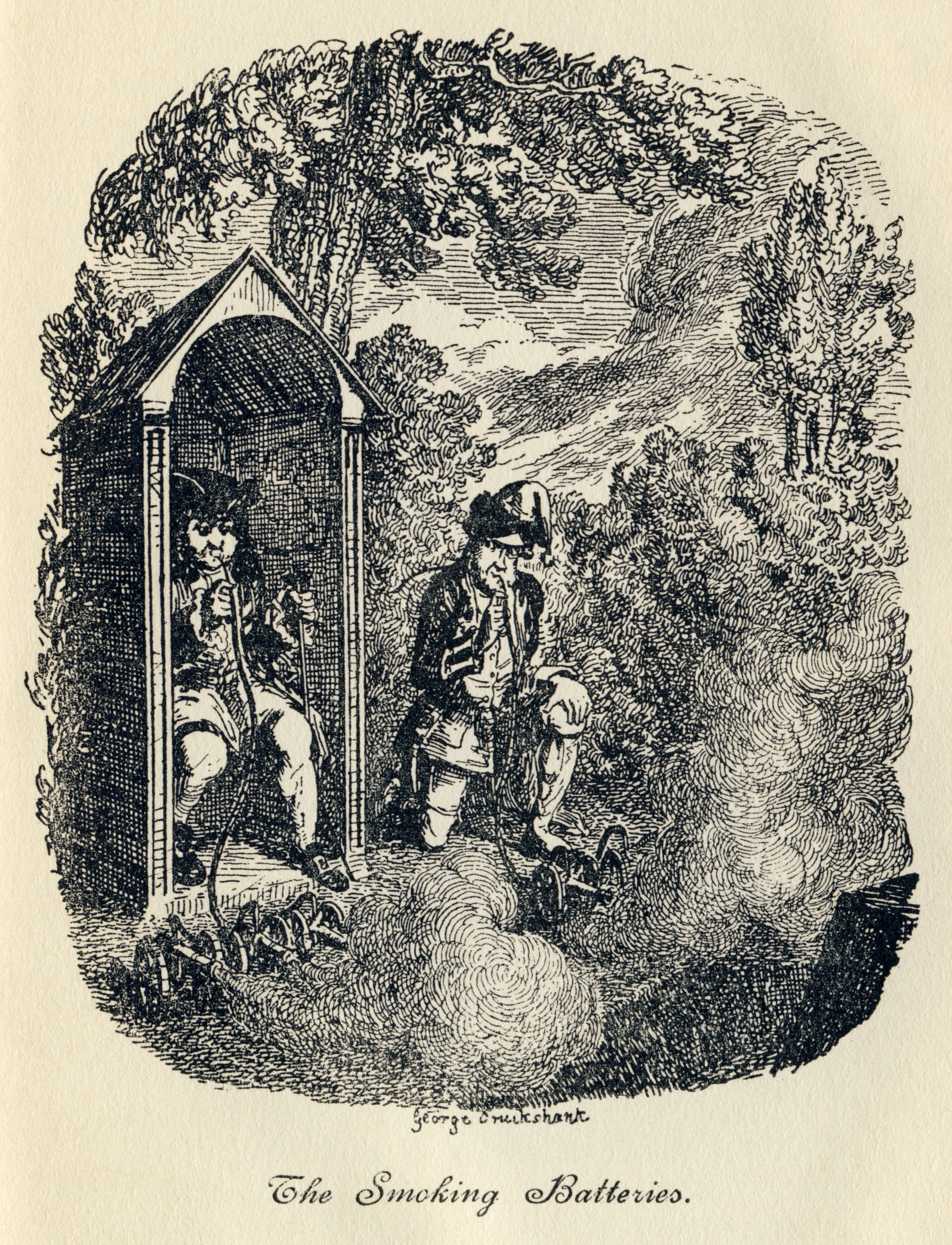
Plate VIII

Others

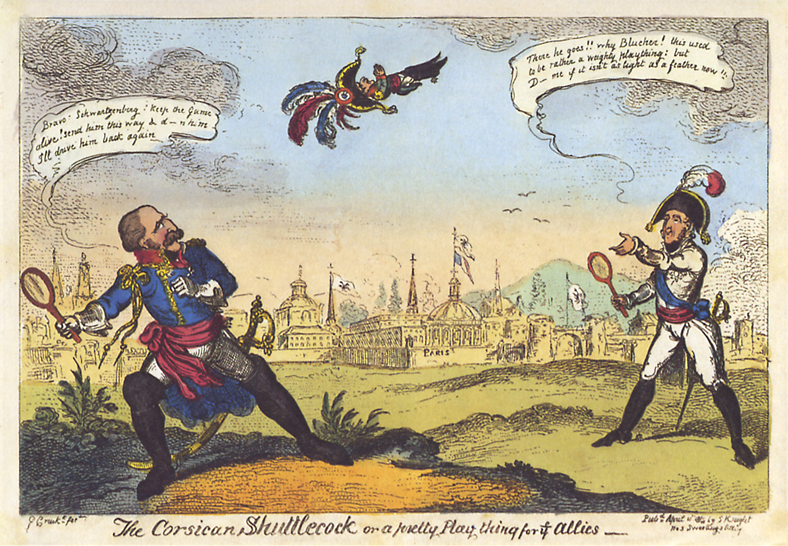
The Corsican Shuttlecock, 1814

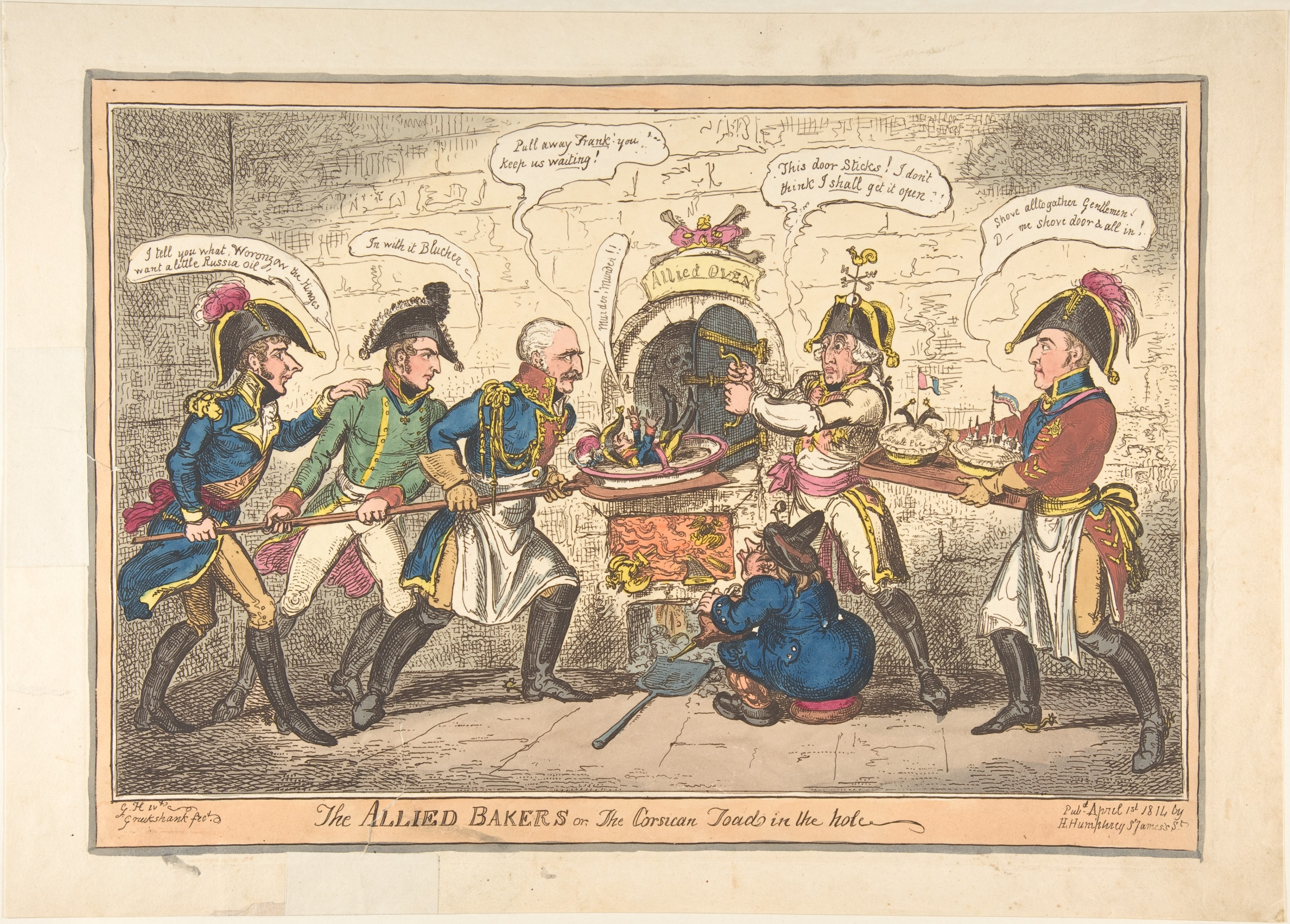
The Allied Bakers, 1814

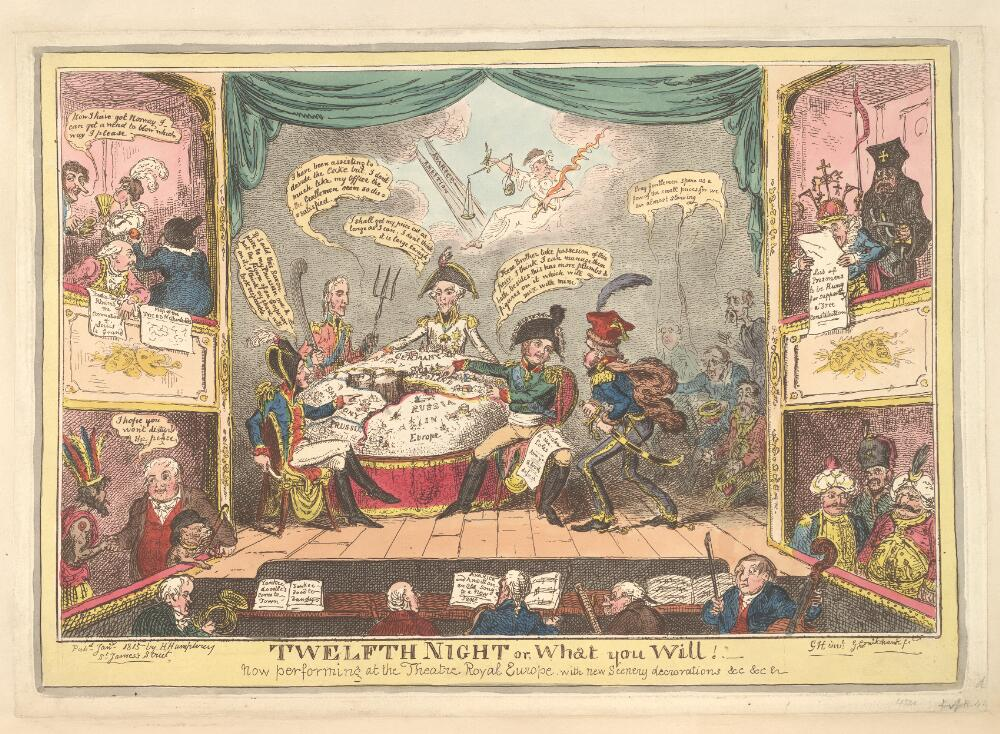
Twelfth Night, 1815. This depicts the Congress of Vienna redrawing the boundaries of Europe following the Napoleonic Wars.

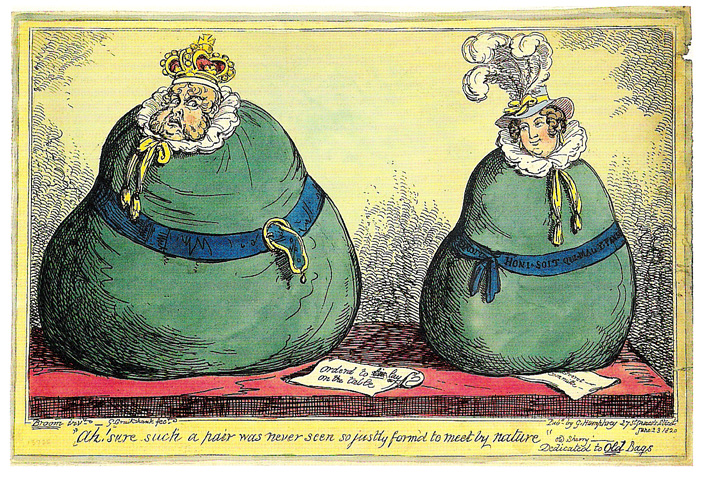
Two Green Bags, 1820. A satire on the Trial of Queen Caroline

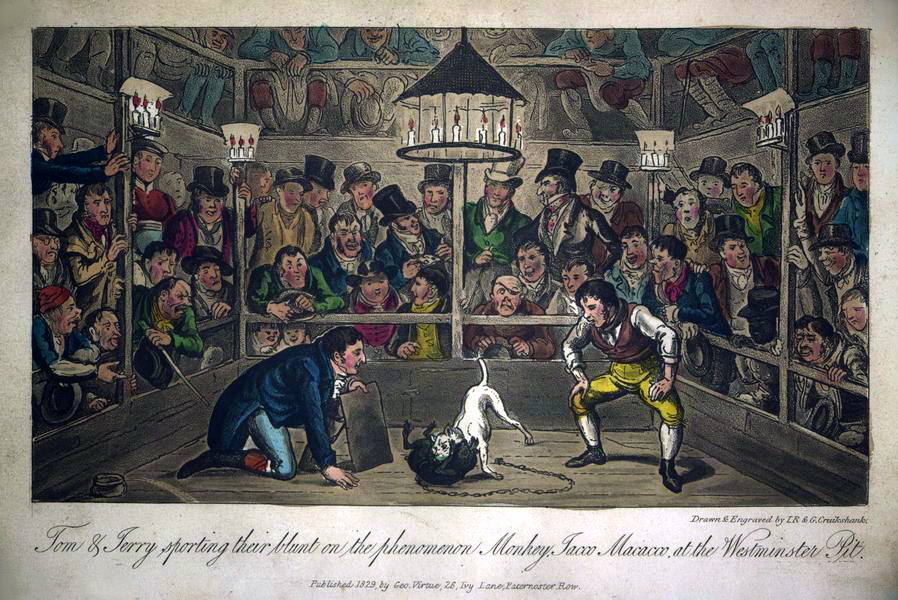
Jacco Macacco at the Westminster-Pit
1821

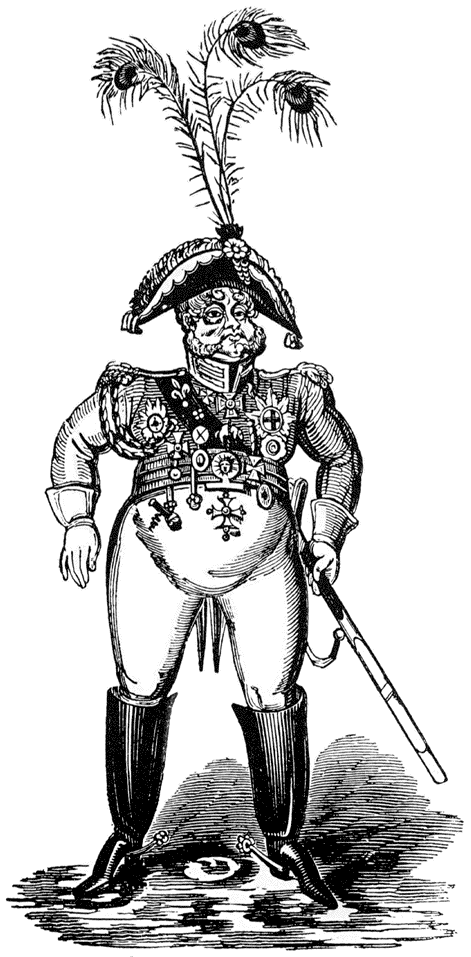
An unflattering 1819 caricature of the Prince Regent illustrating "The Political House that Jack Built" by William Hone

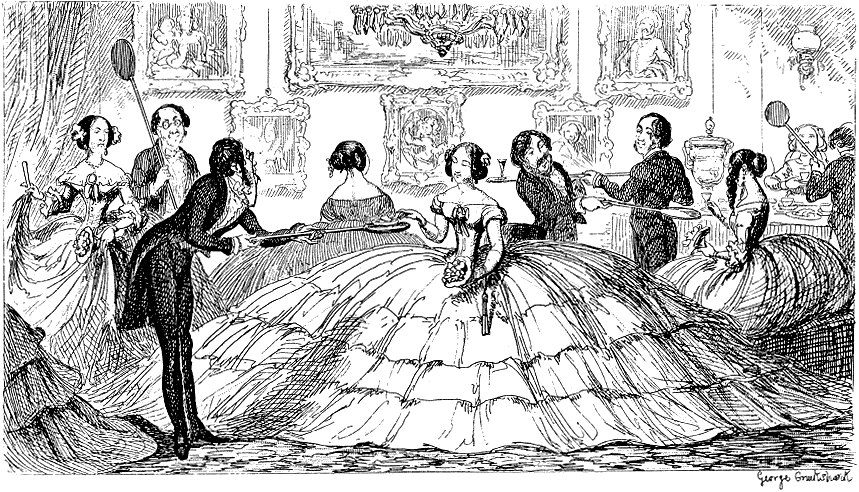
A Splendid Spread, early satire on the crinoline from The Comic Almanack for 1850

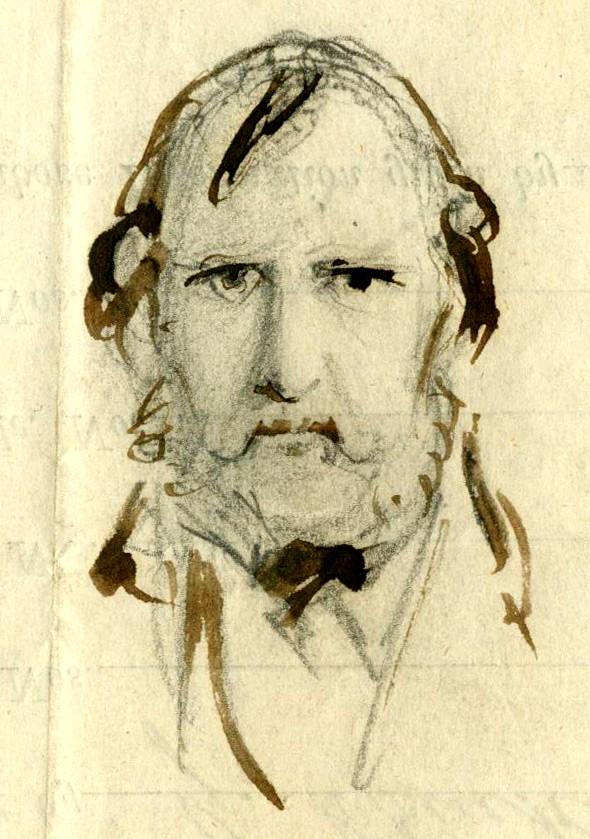
George Cruikshank, Self-Portrait

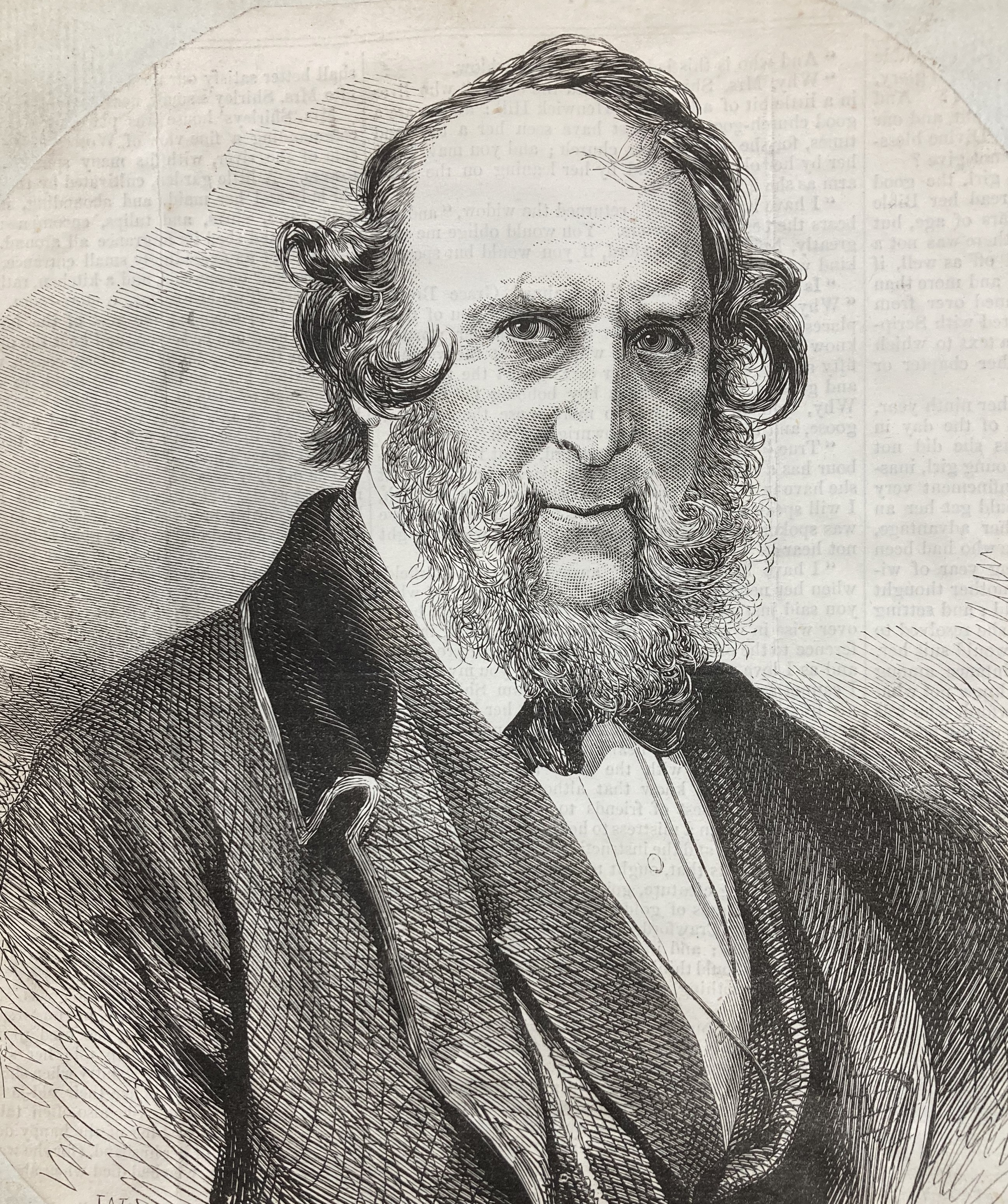
Engraving of George Cruikshank

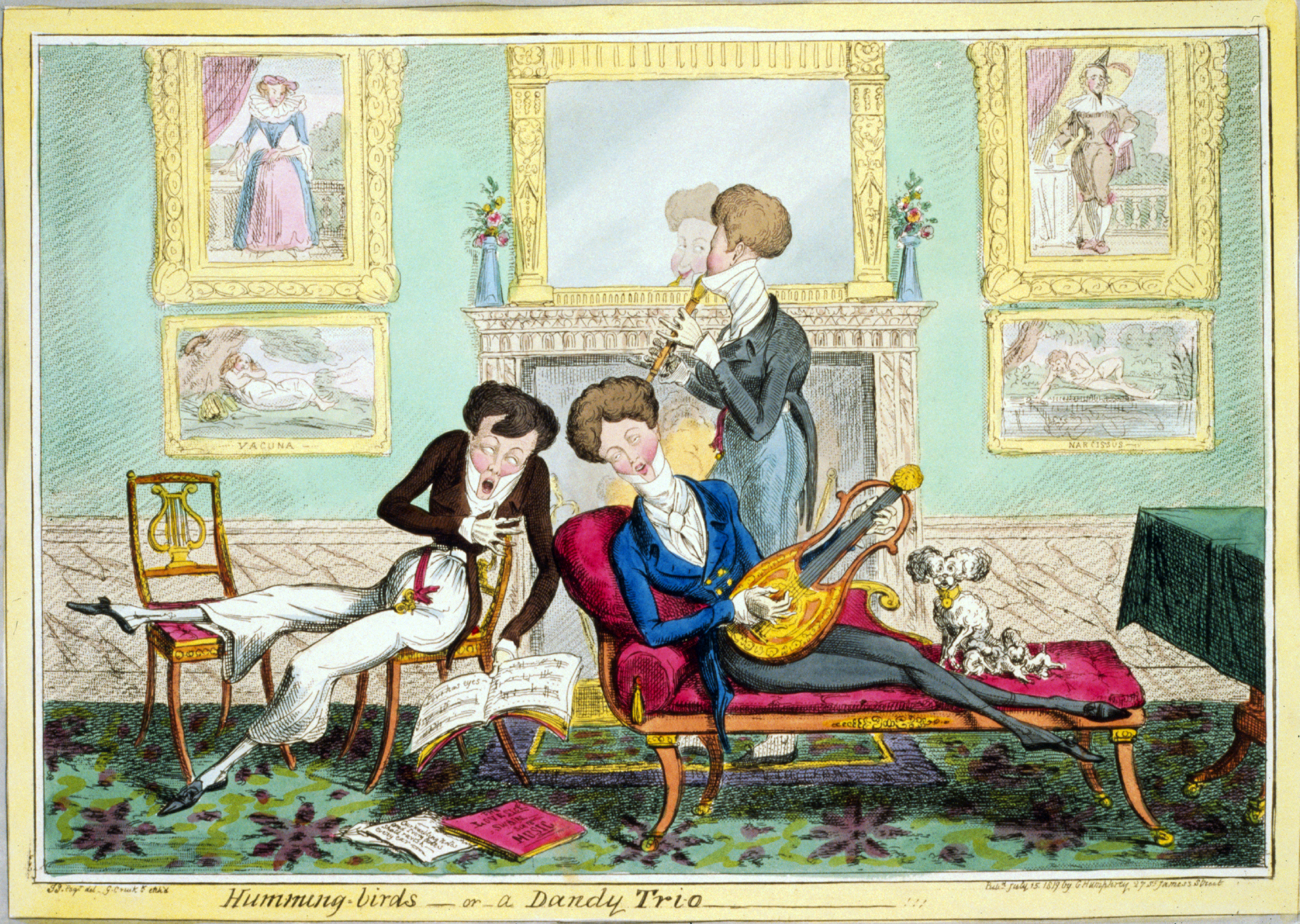
Humming-birds—or—a Dandy Trio. 1819.

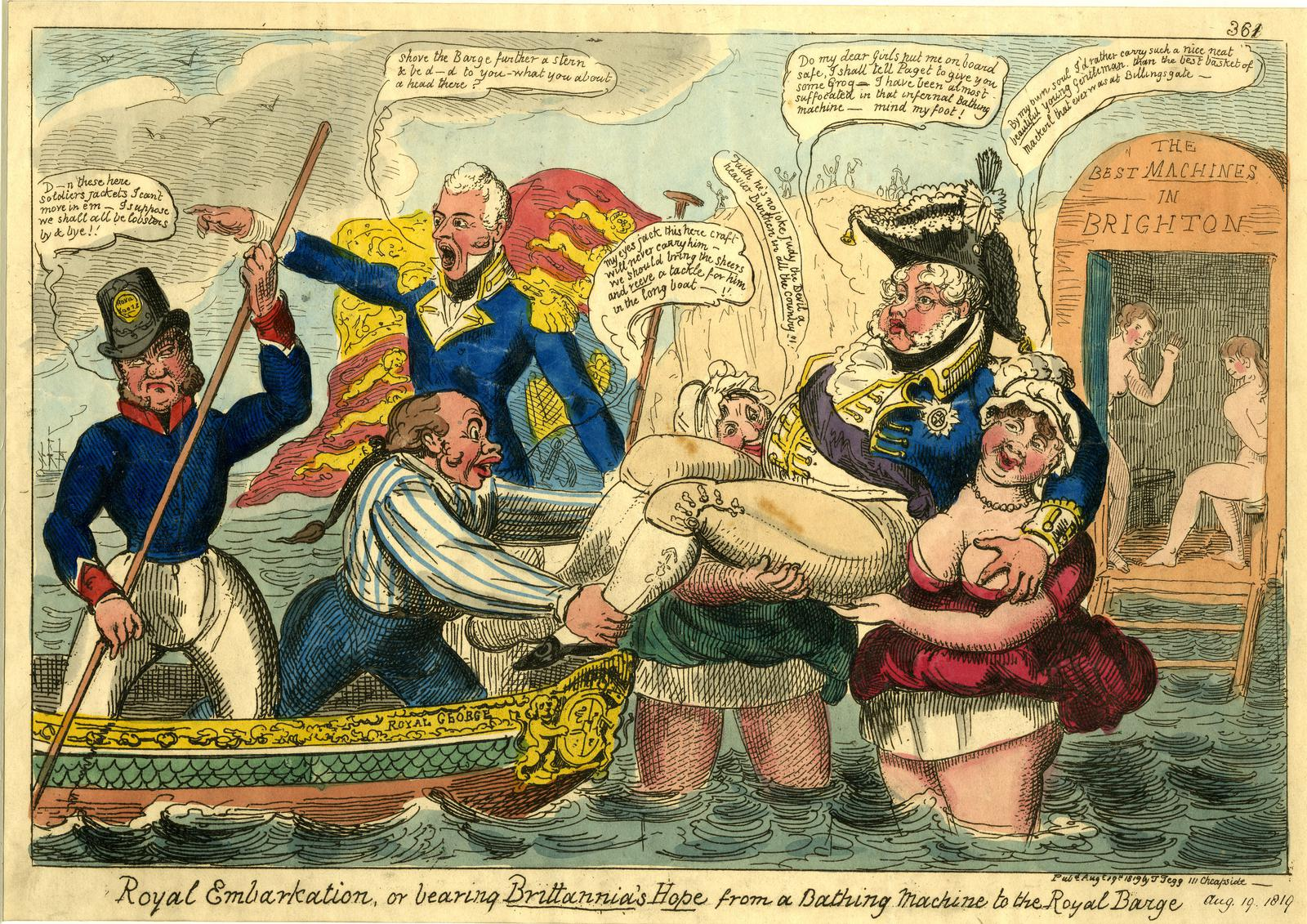
Royal Embarkation, 1819

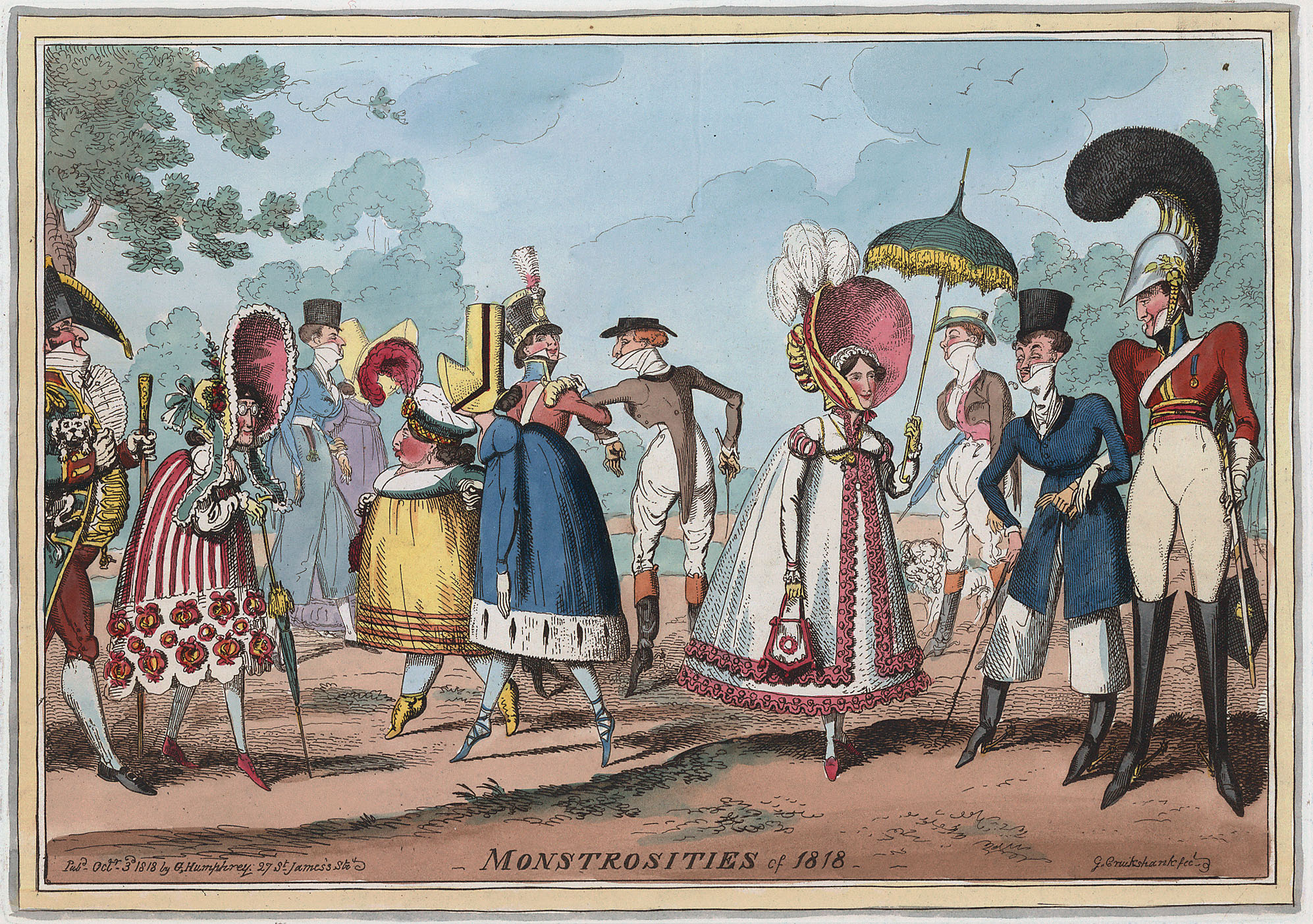
Monstrosities of 1818, extravagant clothing styles of men's and women's fashions

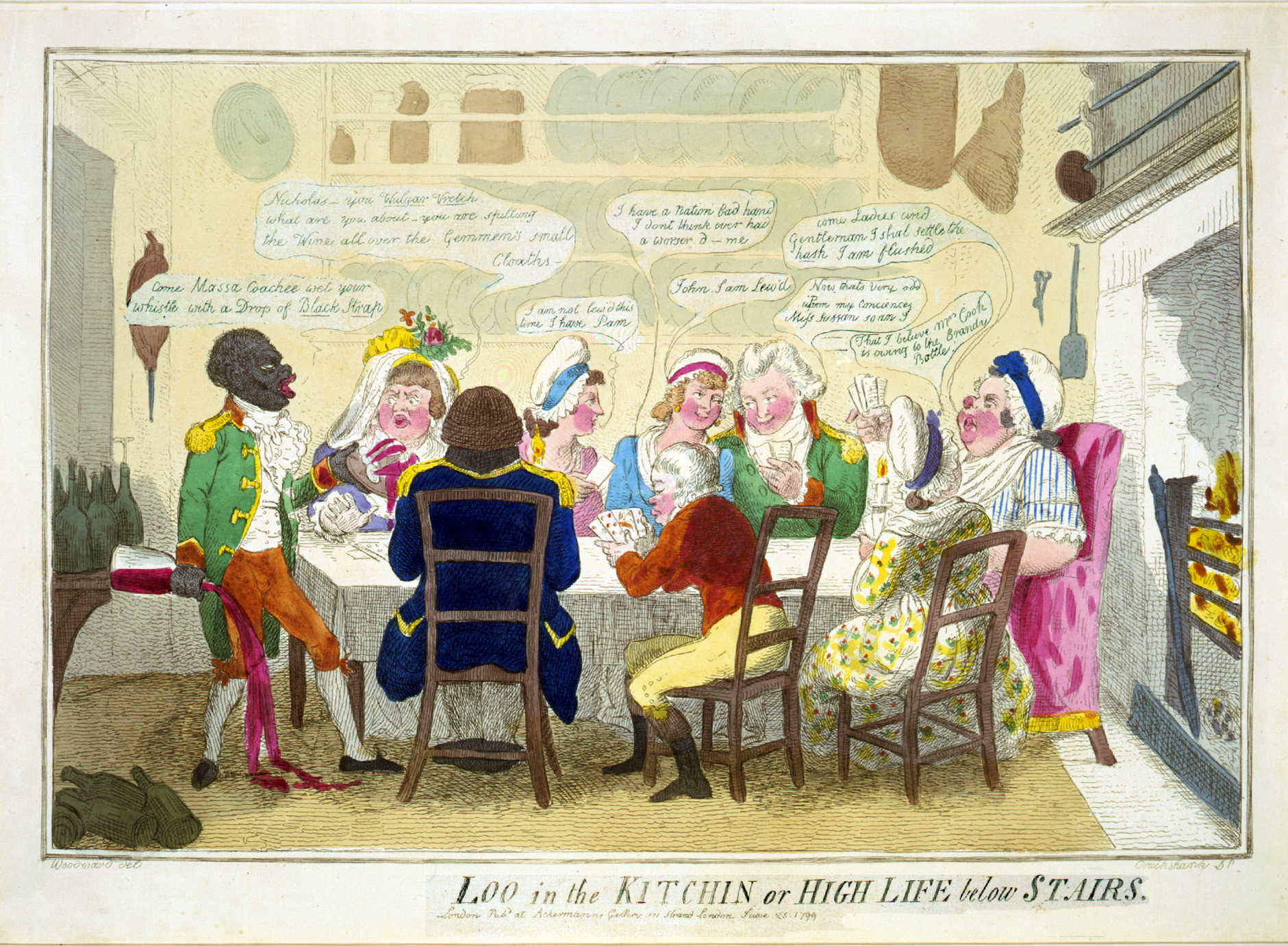
A group of servants gathered in a kitchen, ape the manners of their employers

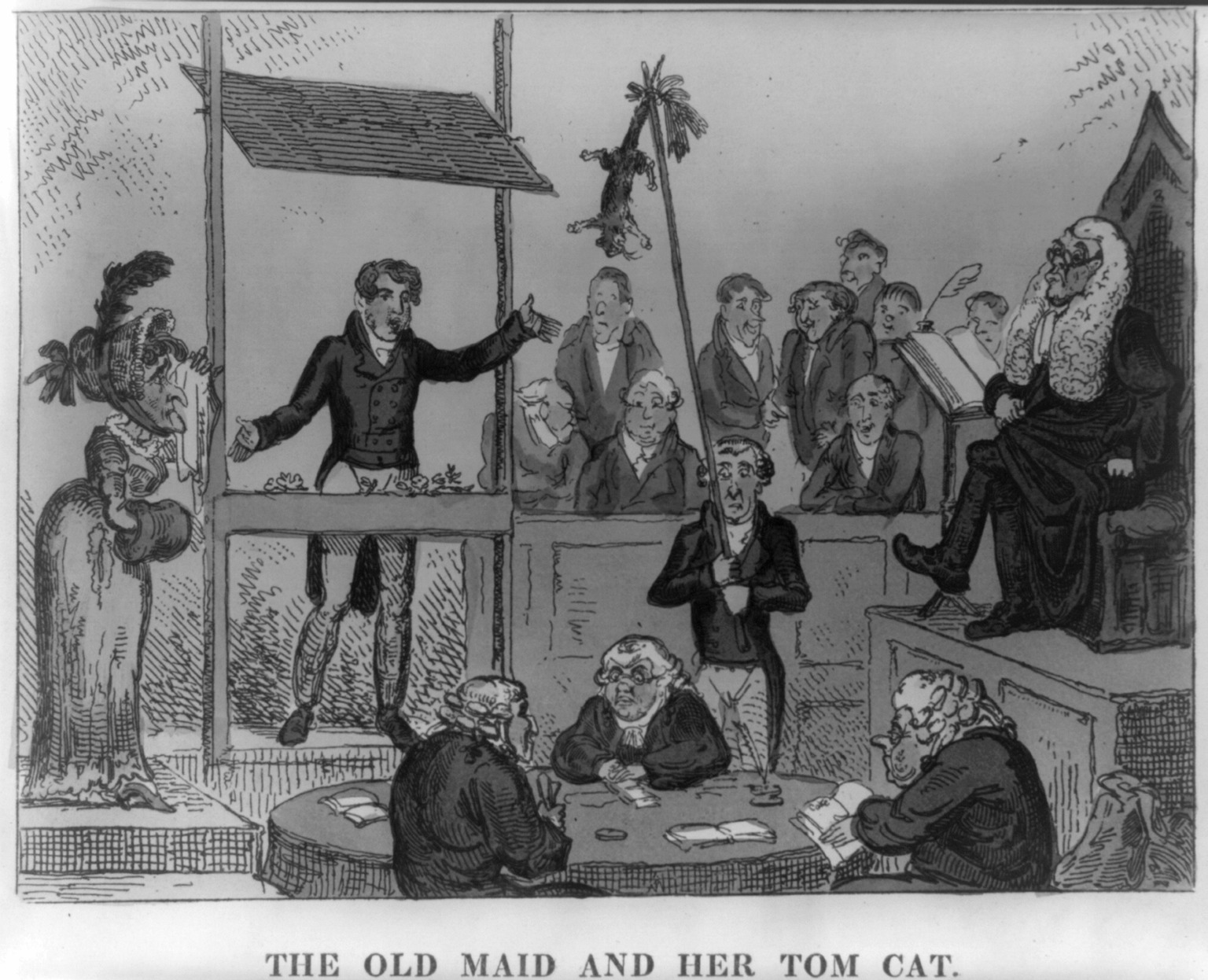
Caricature of the Old Bailey

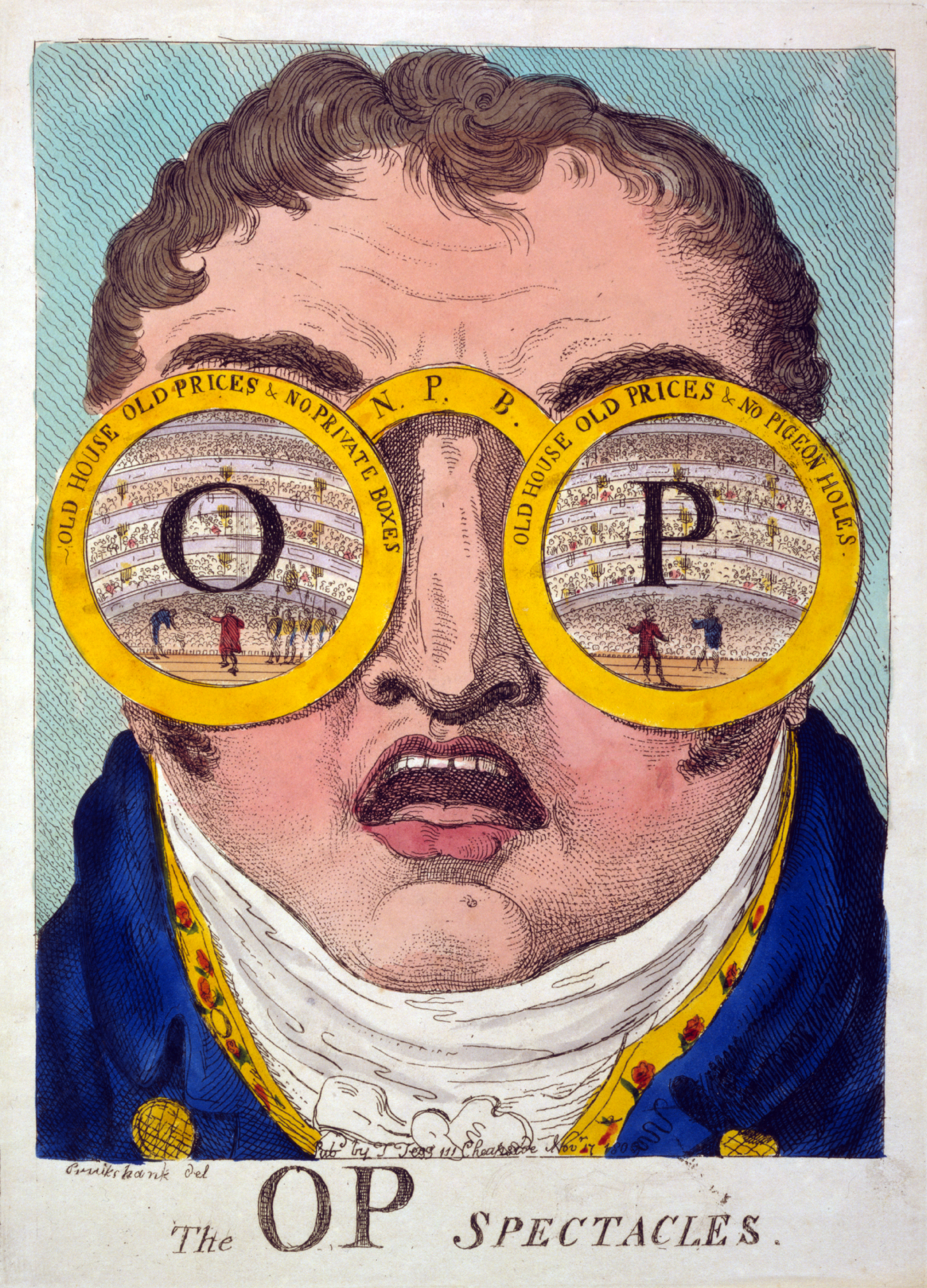
Caricature concerning the prices at the Covent Garden Theatre

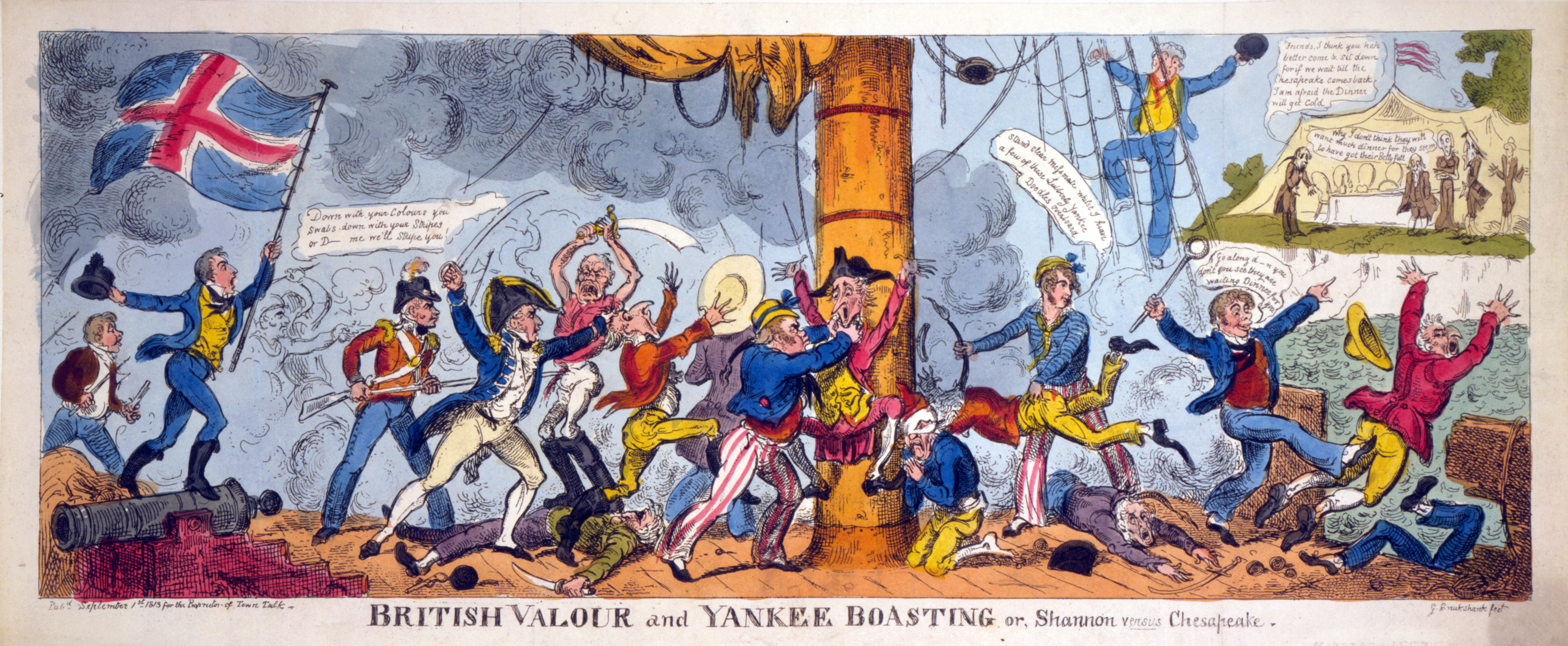
1813 caricature showing the Americans as cowardly in face of the British

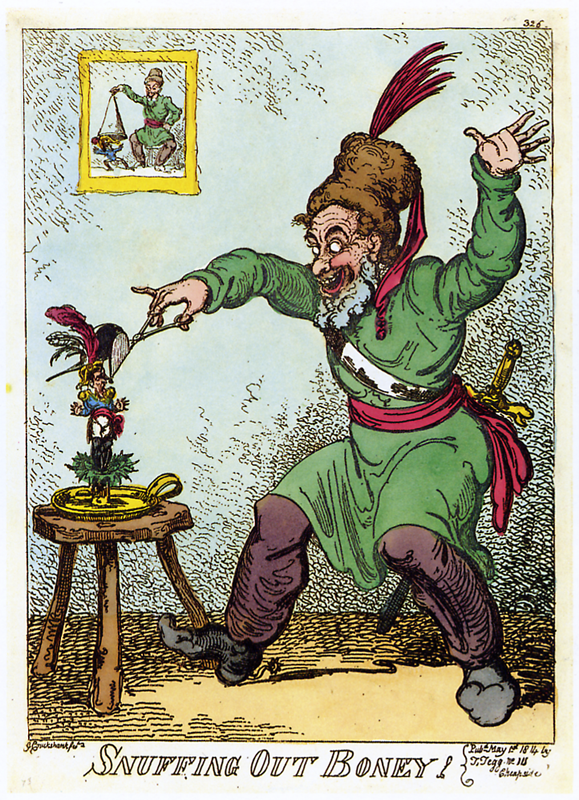
Snuffing out Boney, 1814

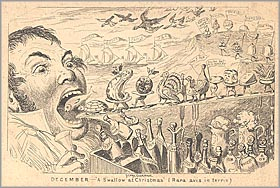
December – A Swallow at Christmas (Rara avis in terris)

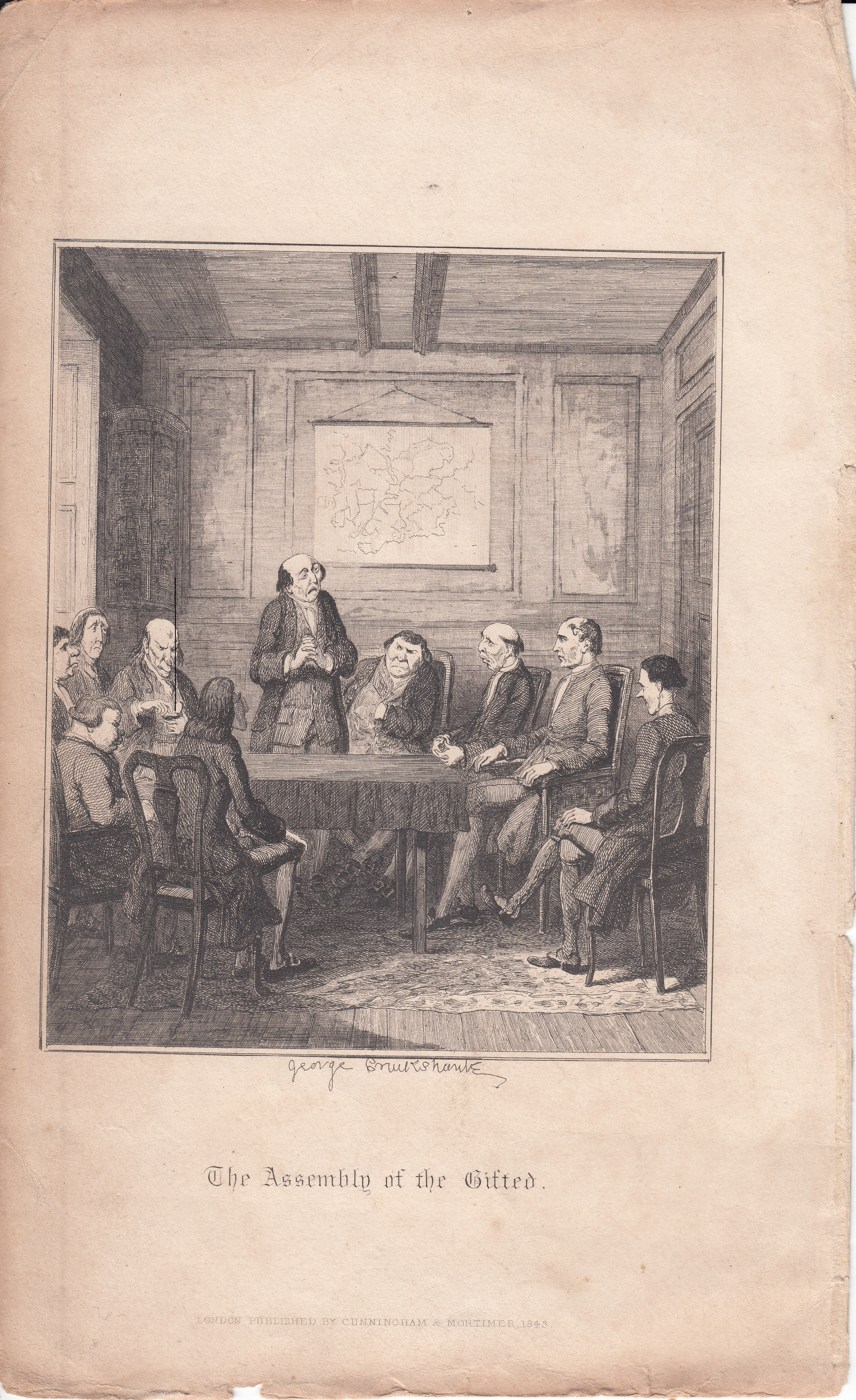
The Assembly of the Gifted

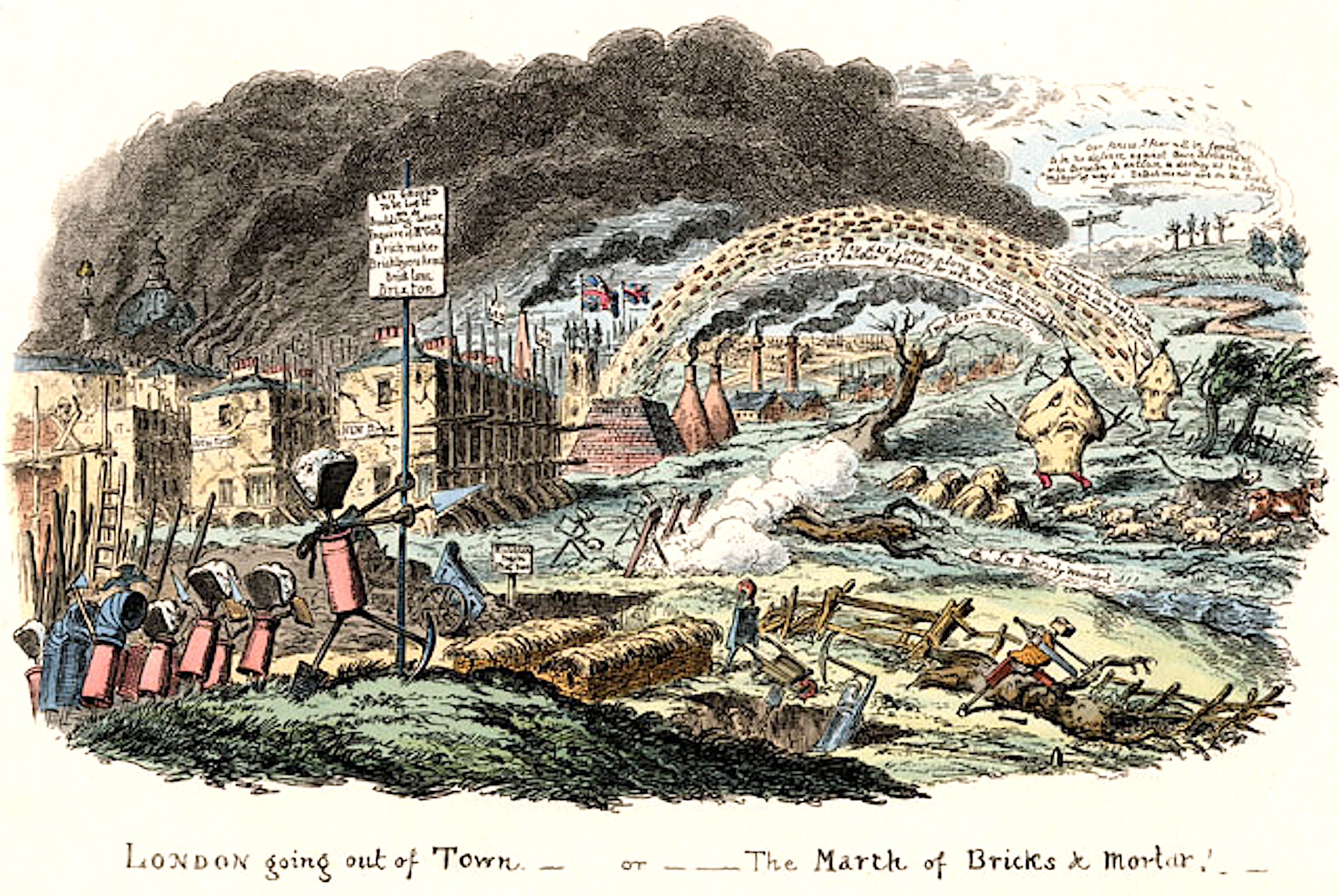
London Going out of Town – or The March of Bricks & Mortar!, 1829
