= The Allied Bakers =

1814 editorial cartoon

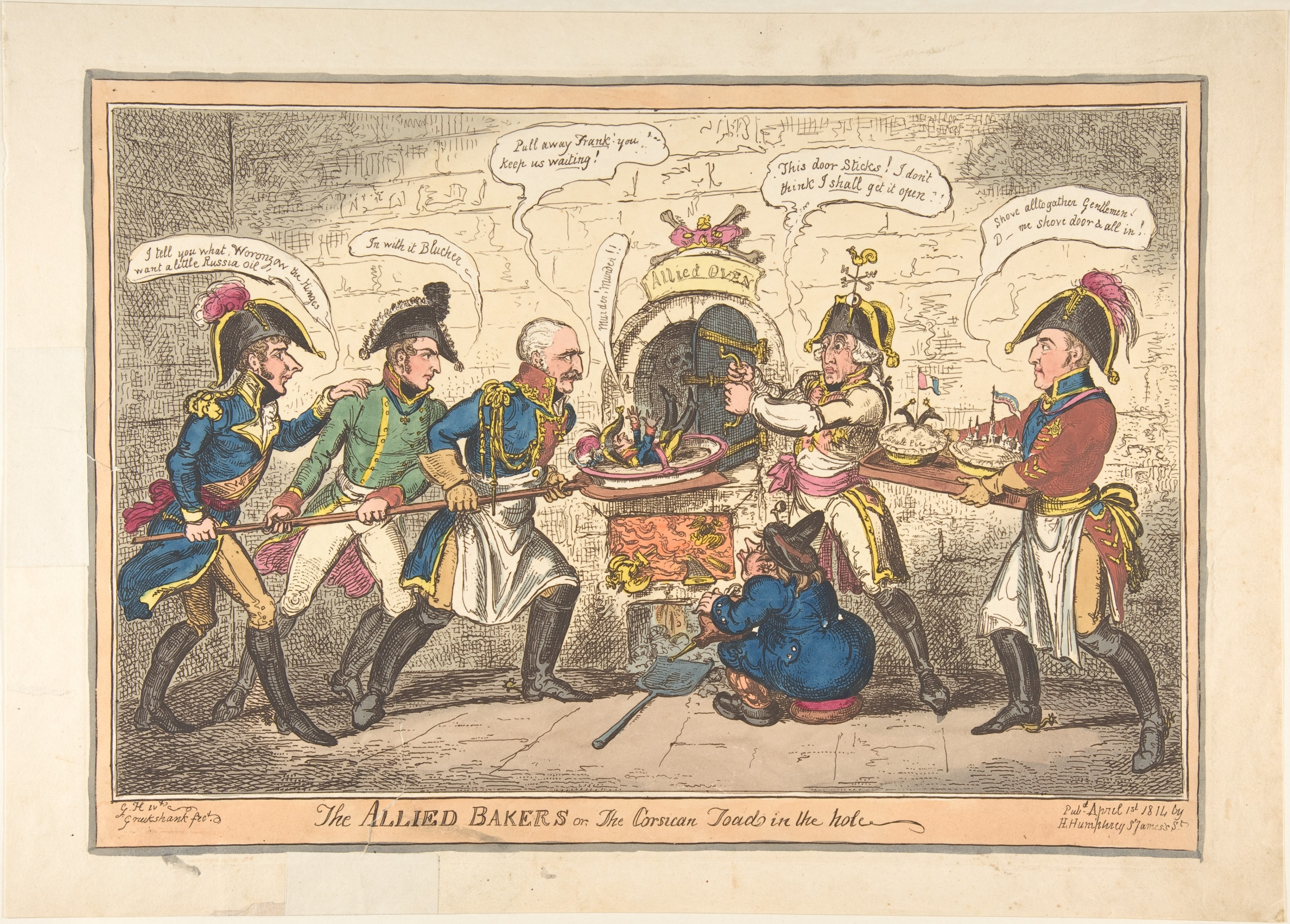
- Artist: George Cruikshank
- Year: 1 April 1814
- Type: Hand-colored etching
- Dimensions: 25.4 cm × 36.1 cm (10.0 in × 14.2 in)

The Allied Bakers or the Corsican Toad-in-the-hole is an 1814 political caricature by the British illustrator George Cruikshank. It makes reference to Napoleon's Corsican heritage and the traditional British dish toad in the hole.

By the spring of 1814 the Napoleonic Wars were rapidly drawing to a conclusion as the Allies encircled Paris. Cruikshank represents the alliance against Napoleonic France as a group of bakers standing by an oven. The bakers of the Sixth Coalition are led by Marshal Blucher of Prussia and Bernadotte, Crown Prince of Sweden to the left of the scene. A Dutch man sits below the bakers next to the oven.

Reflecting Austria's perceived ambiguous status Francis I (father-in-law of Napoleon) is shown pretending that the oven door is too stiff to the open. In sharp contrast the Duke of Wellington, representing Britain, strides forwards with two fresh pies emphasising his victories following the campaign in south-west France. A notable omission is Tsar Alexander I, ruler of Russia and a key participant in the alliance. The Russians are instead represented by Mikhail Vorontsov who stands between Bernadotte and Blucher. Vorontsov was well-known in Britain as the son of the former Russian ambassador to London.

Cruikshank was Britain's leading caricaturist following the retirement of James Gillray. The work was published by Hannah Humphrey who had handled much of Gillray's output. Copies are held in the British Museum and the Museum of Fine Arts in Houston.

== See also ==
- The Corsican Shuttlecock, another 1814 work by Cruikshank.

== Bibliography ==
- McPhee, Constance C. & Orenstein, Nadine, Infinite Jest: Caricature and Satire from Leonardo to Levine, Metropolitan Museum of Art, 2011
- Loxton, Alice, Uproar!: Satire, Scandal and Printmakers in Georgian London, Icon Books, 2003
