= The Corsican Shuttlecock =

1814 editorial cartoon

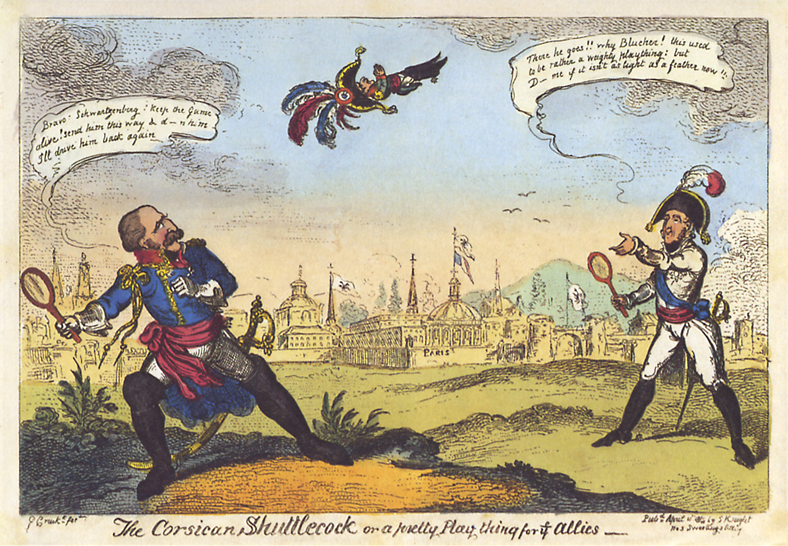
- Artist: George Cruikshank
- Year: 10 April 1814
- Type: Hand-colored etching
- Dimensions: 22.2 cm × 33.7 cm (8.7 in × 13.3 in)

The Corsican Shuttlecock or a Pretty Plaything for the Allies is an 1814 satirical cartoon by the British illustrator George Cruikshank. The print is Cruickshank's take on the recent Battle of Paris and the fall of the French capital.

The print shows a game of badminton being played by the commanders of allied forces the Prussian Marshal Blucher and the Austrian Karl von Schwarzenberg. Napoleon, the Emperor of France who had dominated Continental Europe for more than a decade, is portrayed as a shuttlecock flying through the air. The title makes reference to his Corsican background. Paris is seen in the background with the flag of the Bourbon Monarchy flying above it. Shortly after Cruikshank's print was released, Napoleon abdicated with the Treaty of Fontainebleau. The work began to circulate in France under the title Le Volant Corse.

The work was published on 10 April 1814 by Knight's in Sweetings Alley by the Royal Exchange. Versions of it exist in the Bodleian Library in Oxford and the Philadelphia Museum of Art.

== See also ==
- The Allied Bakers, another 1814 work by Cruikshank depicting the defeat of Napoleon

== Bibliography ==
- Broadley, Alexander Meyrick. Napoleon in Caricature 1795-1821, Volume 2. John Lane, 1911.
- Coupe, W.A. German Political Satires from the Reformation to the Second World War. Part I: 1500-1848. Kraus International Publications, 1993.
- Kelley, Theresa M. Reinventing Allegory. Cambridge University Press, 1997.
- Loxton, Alice. Uproar!: Satire, Scandal and Printmakers in Georgian London. Icon Books, 2003.
- Wetzel, Anorthe & Reich Elisabeth . Loyal Subversion? Caricatures from the Personal Union Between England and Hanover (1714-1837). Vandenhoeck and Ruprecht, 2014
