= Twelfth Night (print) =

1815 cartoon

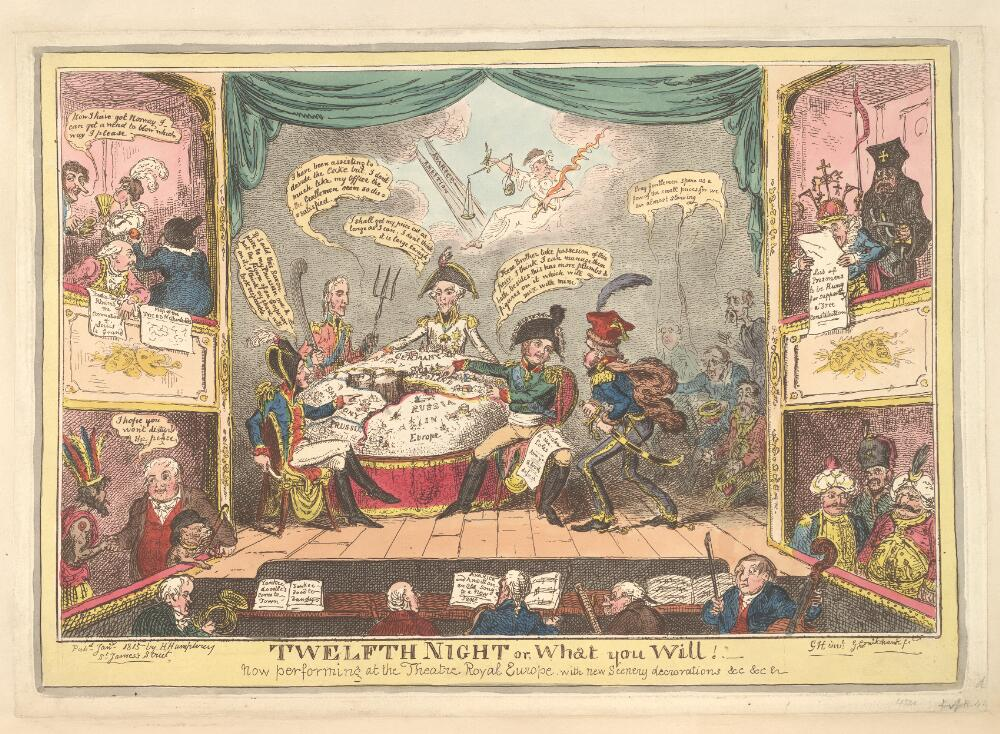

Twelfth Night is an 1815 satirical cartoon by the British caricaturist George Cruikshank. It was published in January 1815, between the first defeat of Napoleon and his return for the Waterloo Campaign. It focuses on the ongoing Congress of Vienna which Cruikshank depicts as the "Theatre Royal, Europe". Based on the London theatres royal at Covent Garden and Drury Lane, the image features caricatures of many leading European rulers and statesman. Led by the British the great powers are seen carving up the cake of Europe while excluding the lesser nations. The scene onstage depicts the Alexander of Russia, Francis of Austria and Frederick William of Prussia led by the British Foreign Secretary Lord Castlereagh, while Alexander's brother Grand Duke Constantine is being called over to take control of Poland. The British figure is sometimes alternatively described as the Duke of Wellington, although he only reached Vienna in early February to replace his colleague Castlereagh. In the background are four shadowy figures depicted as beggars pleading for their thrones who represent Ferdinand of Sicily and the monarchs of Saxony, Bavaria, and Württemberg.

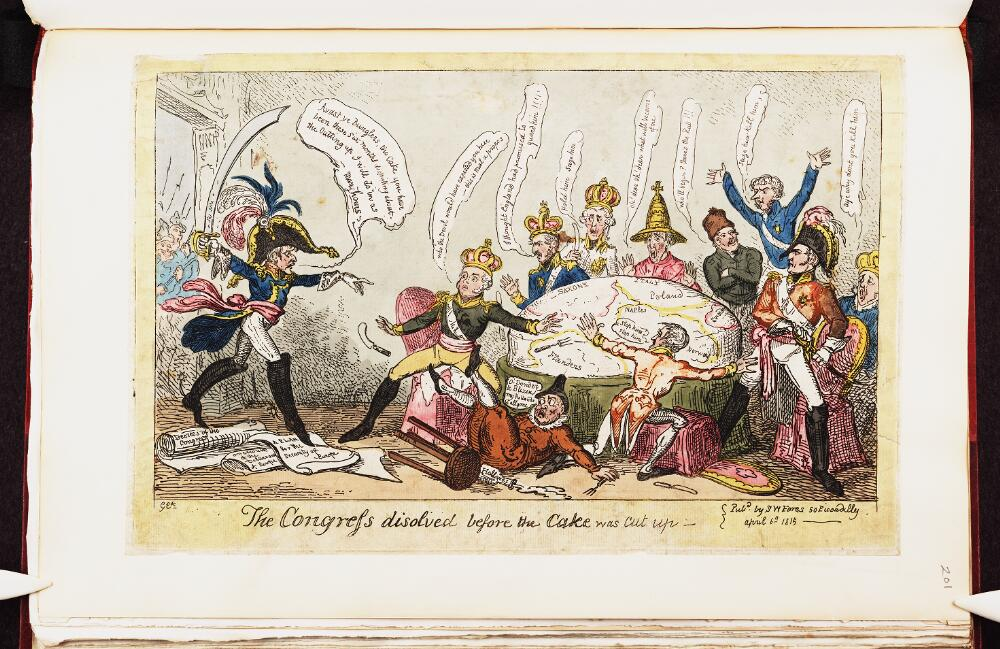
The Congress Dissolved Before the Cake was Cut Up, an April 1815 follow-up by Cruikshank showing Napoleon disrupting the Congress after his escape from Elba.

In the theatre boxes overlooking the stage are a number of the other European powers who watch the proceedings including Louis XVIII of France, Marshal Bernadotte of Sweden and Ferdinand VII of Spain. The title makes reference to the popular delicacy Twelfth Night Cake which was eaten annually around the time the satire was published as well as the tradition of theatrical performances on the twelfth day of Christmas. It was originally published in London by Hannah Humphrey on 2 January 1815.

== Bibliography ==
- Astbury, Katherine & Philp, Mark. Napoleon's Hundred Days and the Politics of Legitimacy. Springer, 2018.
- Haywood, Ian. Romanticism and Caricature. Cambridge University Press, 2013.
- Saglia, Diego & Haywood, Ian. Spain in British Romanticism: 1800-1840. Springer, 2017.
