= Alice Loxton =

English historian, author, broadcaster

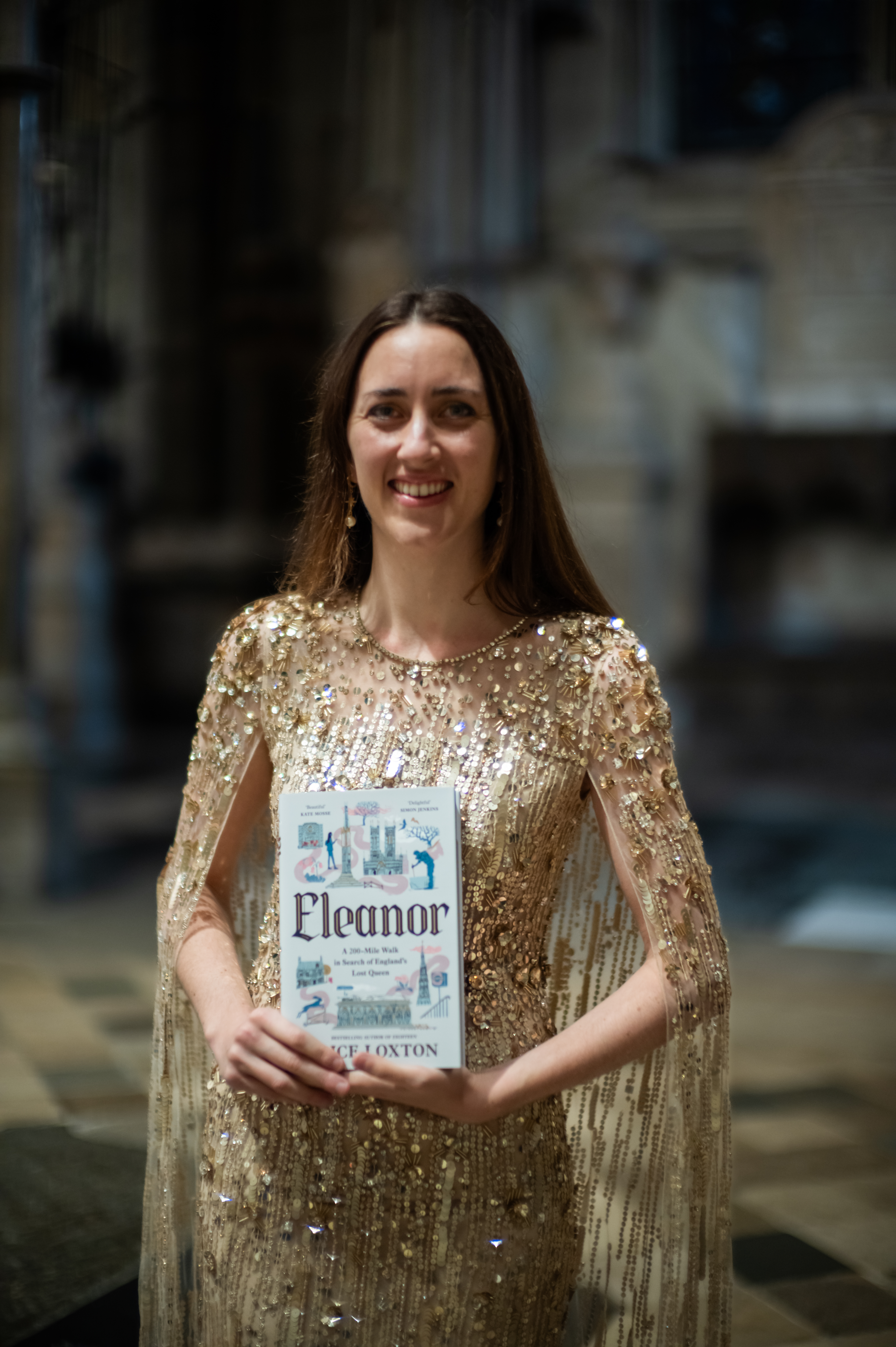
- Loxton at the book launch for Eleanor in 2025
- Born: Ipswich, Suffolk
- Education: University of Edinburgh
- Occupations: Historian, author
- Website: aliceloxton.com

Alice Loxton is a British historian, author, and broadcaster. She has over three million followers across social media where she shares educational videos about history, heritage and art.

== Early life ==
Loxton was educated at Wycombe Abbey, a private girls' school in High Wycombe, and the University of Edinburgh, where she studied history. She attended Georgetown University, Washington, D.C. as an exchange student.

== Career ==
During 2019–2023, Loxton was a presenter, producer and scriptwriter at the History Hit television channel, creating documentaries about British heritage sites such as the Roman Baths, Salisbury Cathedral, Sissinghurst and Wells Cathedral.

Her first book, UPROAR! Satire, Scandal and Printmakers in Georgian London, which came out in March 2023, explored the lives of notable Georgian satirists, James Gillray, Thomas Rowlandson and Isaac Cruikshank.

Her second book, the "unconventional and witty" Eighteen: A History of Britain in 18 Young Lives, came out in September 2024, was a Sunday Times bestseller and winner of Blackwell's Book of the Year 2024. It explored the lives of notable 18-year-olds in history, including studies of the teenage years of Bede, Geoffrey Chaucer, Queen Elizabeth I, Jacques Francis, Jeffrey Hudson, Horatio Nelson, Sarah Biffin, Mary Anning, Richard Burton and Vivienne Westwood.

Loxton's third book, Eleanor: A 200 Mile Walk in Search of England's Lost Queen, explores the legacy of Eleanor of Castille and the Eleanor Crosses. It was launched at Poets' Corner in Westminster Abbey.

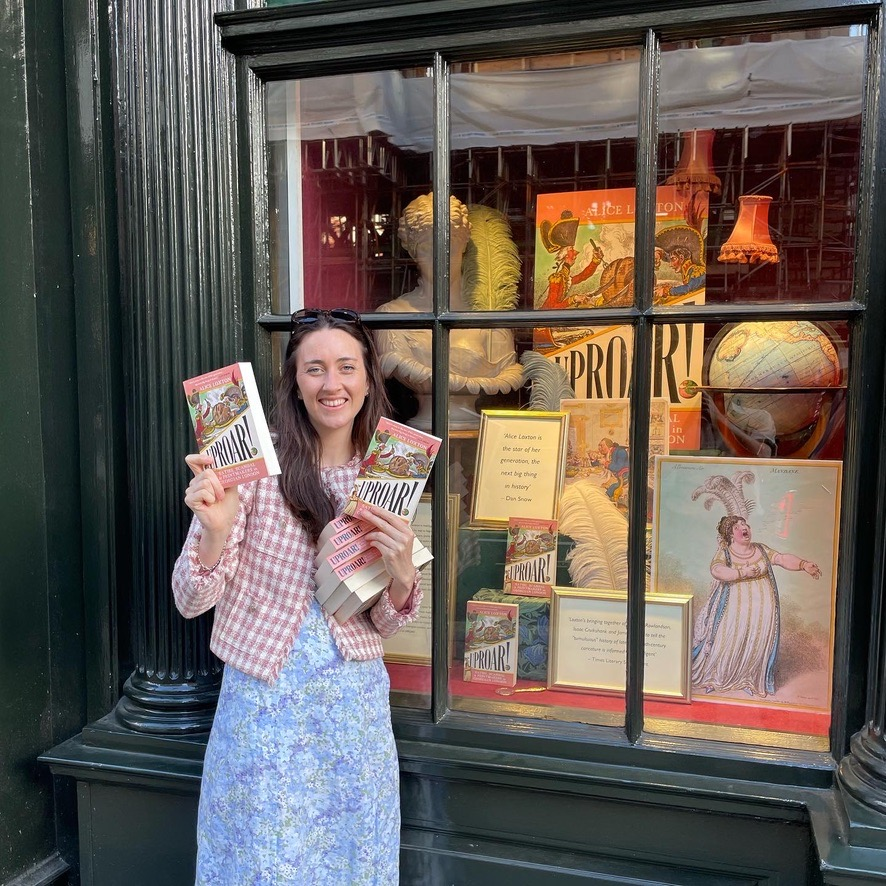
Loxton at Hatchard's Piccadilly with her first book, UPROAR!

Loxton has appeared as a presenter on BBC, History Hit, Sky, Channel 5, and writes book reviews and comment for newspapers, including The Times and The Daily Telegraph, and has been a part of various festivals. She has worked with many different organisations to bring history to new audiences, including 10 Downing Street, The National Gallery, The Royal Academy, The King's Foundation, Tate, The National Portrait Gallery, The National Trust, English Heritage, Microsoft, and Meta.

In 2024, Loxton helped set up the History Extra 30 Under 30 Competition.

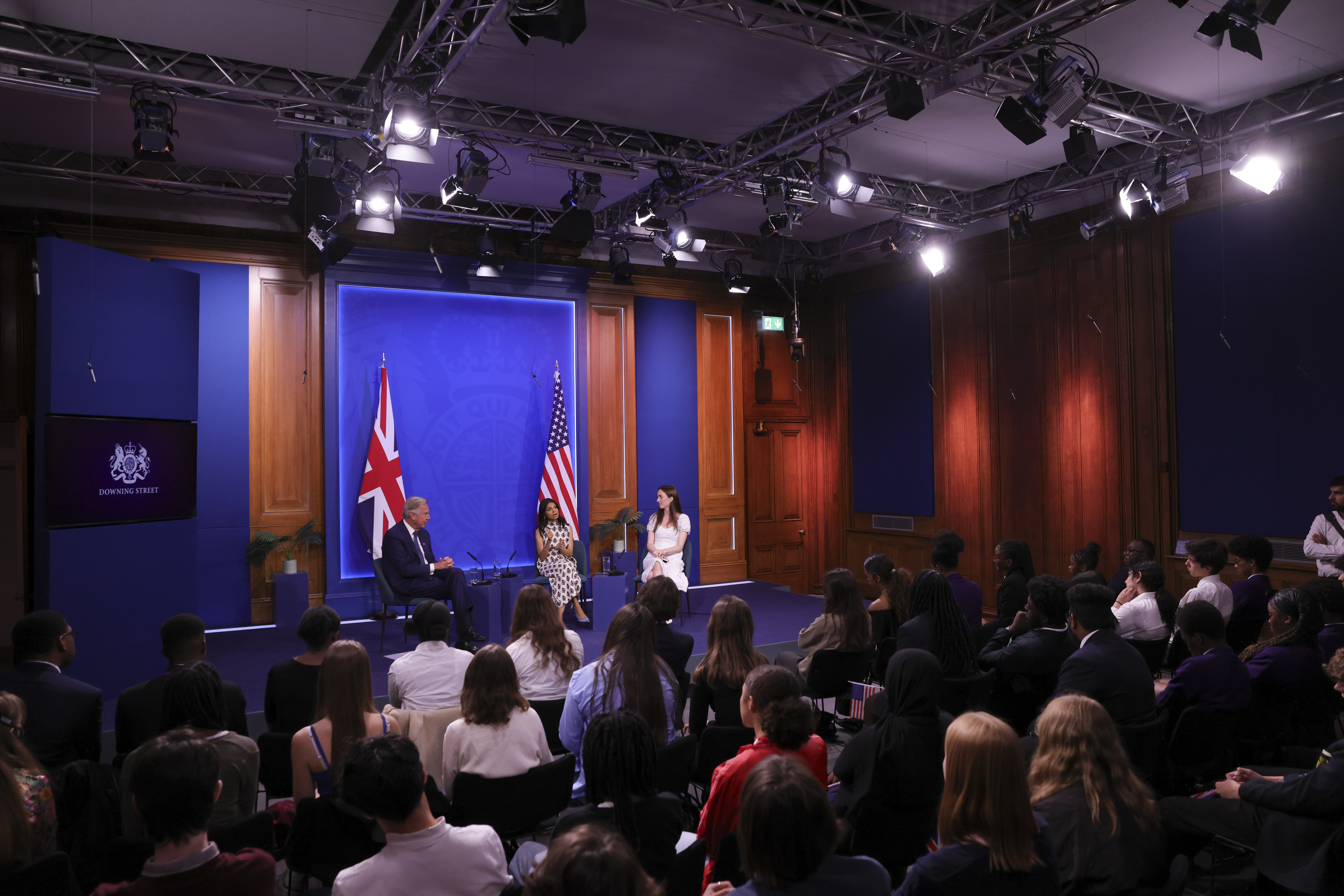
In 2023 Loxton hosted 'Lessons at 10' at 10 Downing Street.

In January 2025, she had over three million followers across social media, with the handle @history_alice.

Loxton is an ambassador for the National Trust, a patron of the British Pilgrimage Trust, and a mentor for The King's Foundation.

== Publications ==
- UPROAR!: Satire, Scandal and Printmakers in Georgian London (Icon Books, 2023)
- Eighteen: A History of Britain in 18 Young Lives (Pan Macmillan, 2024)
- Eleanor: A 200 Mile Walk in Search of England's Lost Queen (Pan Macmillan, 2025)

== Honours ==
In November 2024, Loxton's Eighteen, a study of eighteen historical figures at the age of eighteen, gained the Blackwell's Book of the Year Award for 2024. A Blackwell's representative commented: "Playful but authoritative history is a genre which Alice Loxton is speedily making her own."

== Personal life ==
Loxton was born in Ipswich and now lives in London.
