= Alice Ho (composer) =

Canadian pianist and composer

- Born: Alice Ping Yee Ho; 1960 (age 65–66); Hong Kong
- Education: Indiana University
- Occupations: Pianist, composer
- Spouse: Chan Ka Nin

Alice Ping Yee Ho (Chinese: 何冰頤; pinyin: Hé Bīngyí; b. 1960) is a Canadian pianist and composer, considered to be "among the most important composers writing in this country".

She was born in Hong Kong and earned a Bachelor of Music in composition from Indiana University and a Master of Music in composition from the University of Toronto. She has studied with John Beckwith, Brian Ferneyhough and John Eaton.

Ho performed a solo piano recital for CBC Radio 2. Her works have been featured at music festivals including the ISCM World Music Days, Ottawa Chamberfest, the CRUSH New Music Festival in Denmark and Asian Music Week in Japan.

Her work has been performed by ensembles and solo performers including the China National Symphony Orchestra, Polish Radio Choir, the Lapland Chamber Orchestra, the Esprit Orchestra, the Toronto Symphony Orchestra, the Vancouver Symphony Orchestra, the Winnipeg Symphony Orchestra, the Victoria Symphony, the Windsor Symphony Orchestra, the Nieuw Ensemble, the Penderecki String Quartet, violist Rivka Golani and percussionists Sumire Yoshihara and Beverley Johnston.

Ho was nominated for a Juno Award in 2015 and 2018. She has received awards from the 2014 Prince Edward Island Symphony Composers Competition, the 2014 Kitchener Waterloo Symphony Friendship Orchestral Composition Competition, the 2013 Boston Metro Opera International Composition Competition, the du Maurier Arts Ltd. Canadian Composers Competition, the MACRO (Macro Analysis Creative Research Organization) International Composition Competition and the International League of Women Composers Competition. She has been awarded the Luxembourg Sinfonietta International Composition Prize, the K.M. Hunter Artist Award and the 2013 Dora Mavor Moore Award for "Outstanding Original Opera".

She is married to Chan Ka Nin, a composer and University of Toronto Professor Emeritus. The couple live in Toronto.
