= Scearce =

Scearce is a surname. Notable people with the surname include:

- David Scearce (born 1965), Canadian lawyer and screenwriter
- J. Mark Scearce (born 1960), American composer
- John Scearce (born 1997), American soccer player
