= Penderecki String Quartet =

Canadian musical group

The Penderecki String Quartet is a string quartet, founded in 1986, now based in Waterloo, Ontario, Canada.

== History ==
The original members of the string quartet started in Poland as the New Szymanowski Quartet. In 1986 they won the Penderecki Prize at the National Chamber Music Competition in Łódź, Poland. They performed Penderecki's Quartet No.2, and the composer invited the quartet to take his name.

The PSQ have been Quartet-in-Residence at Canada's Wilfrid Laurier University since 1991. Current members are from Poland, Canada, and the USA. Previously they were affiliated with the University of Wisconsin (1988–91). The quartet's annual Quartetfest at Laurier is an intensive study seminar and concert series.

The quartet's recording of Marjan Mozetich's Lament in the Trampled Garden won the Juno Award for Classical Composition of the Year in 2010.

The Penderecki String Quartet is a champion of contemporary music and has premiered or commissioned over 100 new works from composers in Canada and abroad. Selected composers include Andrew Ager; Carmen Braden; Glenn Buhr; Ka Nin Chan; Brian Cherney; Omar Daniel; Srđan Dedić; John Estacio; Anthony Genge; Jarosław Gołembiowski; Peter Hatch; Christos Hatzis; Daniel Janke; Veronika Krausas; Alice Ho; Matthew Malsky; David L. McIntyre; Piotr Grella-Możejko; Kelly-Marie Murphy; Norbert Palej; Laurie Radford; Jeffrey Ryan; J. Mark Scearce; David Scott; Linda Catlin Smith; Jesse Stewart; Kotoka Suzuki; and Marek Żebrowski.

In October 2013, the PSQ worked with Maestro Krzysztof Penderecki on his Third Quartet (2008) and performed it at Symphony Space in New York City on the occasion of his 80th birthday.

The Penderecki String Quartet was the first Canadian quartet to have recorded the complete Béla Bartók string quartet cycle.

In 2015 Polish composer Marek Żebrowski wrote "Fire" ("Pożar") for the quartet, which David Lynch used for his animated short of the same name.

The Penderecki String Quartet has performed world-wide, including appearances in New York (Weill Recital Hall at Carnegie Hall), Amsterdam (Concertgebouw), Hong Kong (Academy for the Arts), Los Angeles (REDCAT Hall at Disney Center), St. Petersburg (Sheremetev Palace), the Adam Festival in New Zealand, and throughout Europe in Rome, Madrid, Paris, Belgrade, Prague, Kraków, Vilnius, and Zagreb. The PSQ has also toured extensively in Mexico, Venezuela and Brazil and from coast to coast in Canada.

== Current members ==
- Jeremy Bell, violin, 1999-
- Jerzy Kapłanek, violin, 1987-
- Christine Vlajk, viola, 1997-
- Katie Schlaikjer, cello, 2013-

== Past members ==
- Piotr Buczek, violin, 1987-1999
- Mariusz Smolij, violin, 1986-1987
- Yariv Aloni, viola, 1991-1995
- Adam Smyła, viola, 1986-1991
- Dov Scheindlin, viola, 1995-1997
- Zbigniew Szołtysek, cello, 1986-1990
- Paul Pulford, cello, 1990-2003
- Simon Fryer, cello, 2003-2009
- Jacob Braun, cello, 2009-2013

== Awards and recognition ==
- Penderecki Prize at the National Chamber Music Competition in Łódz, Poland, in 1986
- Juno Awards 2010 Classical Composition of the Year for their performance of Marjan Mozetich's Lament in the Trampled Garden

== Selected discography ==
- Béla Bartók: Complete String Quartets (Eclectra, 2005)
- Launch Pad: new Canadian quartets commissioned by the Penderecki String Quartet; Radford, Ho, Grella-Możejko, Janke, Ryan (Centrediscs, 2008)
- Marjan Mozetich: Lament in the Trampled Garden (Toronto: Centrediscs, 2009) Juno Awards of 2010 Classical Composition of the Year
- Beethoven: String Quartets Nos. 15 & 16 (Marquis Music, 2014)
- De Profundis, Quartets by Norbert Palej (world premiere) and Krzysztof Penderecki (Marquis Music, 2016)

== Selected concert reviews ==
- Penderecki’s past is prologue for a night of chamber music at Symphony Space by George Grella, New York Classical Review, 27 October 2013.
- Penderecki Quartet Makes the Difficult Seem Easy by Timothy Mangan, Los Angeles Times, 19 March 1998.
