= Jean Coulthard =

Canadian composer

Jean Coulthard CM OBC
- Born: February 10, 1908; Vancouver, British Columbia, Canada
- Died: March 9, 2000 (aged 92); Vancouver, British Columbia
- Occupations: Composer, teacher

Jean Coulthard, OC OBC (February 10, 1908 – March 9, 2000) was a Canadian composer and teacher. She was one of a trio of women composers who dominated Western Canadian music in the twentieth century: Coulthard, Barbara Pentland, and Violet Archer. All three died within weeks of each other in 2000. Her works might be loosely termed "prematurely neo-Romantic," as the orthodox serialists who dominated academic musical life in North America during the 1950s and 1960s had little use for her.

== Life and career ==
=== Early life and education ===
Born in Vancouver, British Columbia, Coulthard was the daughter of Jean Blake Robinson Coulthard, a prominent and influential music teacher in Vancouver. Through her mother, she received her earliest musical training and was introduced at an early age to the work of French composers like Claude Debussy and Maurice Ravel, both of whom were lifelong influences. From 1924-1928 she studied the piano with Jan Cherniavsky and music theory with Frederick Chubb. A scholarship from the Vancouver Women's Musical Club enabled her to pursue studies at the Royal College of Music in 1928-1929 where she was a pupil of Kathleen Long, R.O. Morris, and Ralph Vaughan Williams. She studied in the 1930s and early 1940s with such composers as Béla Bartók, Aaron Copland, and Arnold Schoenberg. In 1944-1945, Coulthard worked for an entire academic year with Bernard Wagenaar of the Juilliard School, New York. In 1948, she met the British composer Elizabeth Poston (who was visiting Canada) and they began a long friendship and an extensive correspondence over the next 30 years.

=== Professional career ===
Beginning in 1925, Coulthard taught the piano privately in her mother's studio, and then as an independent teacher (1935–1947). In 1947, she joined the fledgling Department of Music in the Faculty of Arts of the University of British Columbia. The head of the department, Harry Adaskin, hired first Coulthard, and then (in 1949) Barbara Pentland, to teach theory and composition. Coulthard taught composition in the department, and later (from 1967) in the administratively distinct UBC School of Music (1967–1973). In 1956-7, she spent a year in Paris and Roquebrune, southern France, beginning an opera and completing several substantial chamber and vocal works. A later sabbatical in London permitted Coulthard to work sustainably with Gordon Jacob, the British composer and orchestrator.

=== Legacy ===
Coulthard's composition students included Canadian composers Chan Ka Nin, Michael Conway Baker, Sylvia Rickard, Ernst Schneider, Robert Knox, Jean Ethridge, Joan Hansen, David Gordon Duke, Lloyd Burritt, and Frederick Schipizky.

In 1978, she was made an Officer of the Order of Canada. In 1994, she was awarded the Order of British Columbia. She also received honorary doctorates from the University of British Columbia in 1988 and from Concordia University in 1991. Her work was also part of the music event in the art competition at the 1948 Summer Olympics. The Vancouver Symphony Orchestra continues to honor her legacy through the annual Jean Coulthard Readings, established in 2005, a yearly event in which young composers have the chance to receive mentorship from an established composer and to hear their works performed by a major orchestra.

== Music ==
Coulthard composed around 350 works throughout her long career in most traditional genres: an opera, four symphonies, a violin concerto, three string quartets and other chamber music, many instrumental sonatas, and songs and choral music to Canadian and other texts. Her style was predominantly Romantic and Impressionistic, though more experimental material, including electronics, bitonal and quartal harmonies, unusual scales, serialism, and tone clusters, became more common from the 1960s. Canadian musicologist and pianist Elaine Keillor identifies in her style "both a lyricism expressed within a contemporary musical language and a brooding introspection often associated with the geography of Western Canada."

Among her best-known pieces are: Prayer for Elizabeth for strings, written in 1952 for the coronation of Queen Elizabeth II and showing the influence of her teacher Ralph Vaughan Williams; the Concerto for Piano and Orchestra (1963); and the highly regarded Twelve Essays on a Cantabile Theme for string octet (1972). The earliest compositions - such as Cradle Song (1927) and Threnody, (1935) - are small-scale vocal pieces, but under the influence and encouragement of Arthur Benjamin, she began to tackle orchestral works from the 1940s, establishing her reputation. They include the Canadian Fantasy (1940), the ballet Excursion (1940), Ballade (A Winter's Tale) (1940) and Song to the Sea.

From the mid-1940s Coulthard's style became more distinct and personal as she combined traditional forms with more extended harmonies, as in the Piano Sonata No 1 of 1947, her first work to be performed at Carnegie Hall. The Violin Concerto is another example of this phase in her career. It received its first performance in 1959 with soloist Thomas Rolston and the Vancouver Symphony Orchestra. It was followed by the Concerto for Piano and Orchestra (1963), which attracted mainstream attention and was later recorded by Robert Silverman with the same orchestra.

Her later work, after 1960, includes her most personal, abstract works such as the Third String Quartet and the octet Twelve Essays on a Cantabile Theme. The Birds of Lansdowne (1972) incorporates recorded birdsong from Vancouver Island. Her opera The Return of the Native was begun while she was in France in 1956, completed in 1979, and finally performed (though only in concert form) in September 1993.

The Canadian Broadcasting Corporation has issued several recordings as transcription discs. In 1982, a six-record set of Coulthard's music was included in the Anthology of Canadian Music series. The double CD, Jean Coulthard, released by Centrediscs in 2002 as part of the Canadian Composers Portraits series, includes an hour-long documentary alongside recordings of the Piano Concerto, Sketches from the Western Woods, and Twelve Essays on a Cantabile Theme.

== Principal works ==
=== Chamber and Solo Music ===
- Cradle Song, for soprano and piano (1927)
- Four Studies for Piano (1945)
- Piano Sonata No. 1 (1947)
- Cello Sonata (1947)
- Oboe Sonata (1947)
- String Quartet No. 1 (1948)
- Three Love Songs (1948), text Louis MacKay
- Sonata in Duet, for violin and piano (1952)
- String Quartet No. 2, Threnody (1954, rev. 1969)
- 12 Preludes (1954–1964)
- Aegean Sketches, for piano (1961), composed for Gina Bachauer
- Sonata Rhapsody, for viola and piano (1962, rev. 1995)
- Six Medieval Songs, for baritone and piano (1962)
- Variations on BACH (1951)
- Lyric Trio, for piano, violin, and cello (1968)
- Divertimento, for horn, bassoon and piano (1968)
- Lyric Sonatina, for bassoon and piano (1969)
- The Pines of Emily Carr, for alto, narrator, timpani, piano, string quartet (1969)
- Day-dream, for violin and piano (1970)
- Sketches from the Western Woods, for piano (1970), composed for John Ogdon
- Lyric Sonatina, for flute and piano (1971)
- The Birds of Lansdowne, for piano trio and tape (1972)
- Octet (double string quartet) (1972)
- Twelve Essays on a Cantabile Theme, for string octet (1972)
- Three Sonnets of Shakespeare, for alto and string quartet (1977)
- String Quartet No. 3 (1981)
- Piano Sonata No. 2 (1986)
- Introduction and Three Folk Songs (1990)

=== Choral Works ===
- Threnody for chorus, words by Robert Herrick (1935)
- Auguries of Innocence, for chorus, words William Blake (1963-65)
- Three Ballades From the Maritimes, for chorus (1979)

=== Orchestral Works ===
- Canadian Fantasy, for orchestra (1940)
- Song to the Sea, for orchestra (1942)
- Symphony No. 1 (1950)
- A Prayer for Elizabeth, for strings (1953)
- Violin Concerto (1959)
- Piano Concerto (1963, rev. 1967)
- Endymion, symphonic poem (1964)
- This Land (Symphony No. 2), for chorus and orchestra (1967)
- Lyric Symphony (Symphony No. 3), for bassoon and orchestra (1975)
- Burlesca, for piano and orchestra (1977)
- Symphonic Ode, for viola and orchestra (1977)
- Spring Rhapsody, for alto and orchestra or piano (1978)
- Autumn Symphony (No. 4), for string orchestra (1984)
- Symphonic Image Vision of the North, for string orchestra (1989)
- Music to St. Cecilia, for organ and strings (1993)

=== Ballet and Opera ===
- The Devil's Fanfare, ballet (1958)
- Return of the Native, opera (1979)

== See also ==
- Music of Canada
- List of Canadian composers
- Canadian classical music
- Chronological list of Canadian classical composers
