= Adam Scime =

Canadian composer and double bassist (born 1982)

- Born: 1982 (age 43–44)
- Origin: Toronto
- Genre: Classical
- Occupation: Composer
- Instrument: Double bass
- Website: adamscime.com

Adam Scime (born 1982) is a Canadian composer and double bassist based in Toronto, Ontario.

== Early life and education ==
Scime was born in Hamilton. He studied at the University of Western Ontario, graduating with a BMus in 2007 and an MMus in 2009. He also attended the University of Toronto as a Doctoral student in composition, where he began a long association with the Esprit Orchestra by winning a contest organized by the group.

== Career ==
Scime played bass on Jim MacDonald's 2005 album Weights and Measures.

In 2012 Adam's piece Mirage earned third prize in the Sir Ernest MacMillan category of the Annual Society of Composers, Authors and Music Publishers of Canada Foundation Awards for Young Composers. Also in 2012 Adam's piece After the rioT was awarded the Karen Keiser Prize in Canadian Music. He has received commissioning grants from the Canada Council for the Arts, and the Ontario Arts Council that include works for Ensemble contemporain de Montréal, The Esprit Orchestra, Array Music, and New Music Concerts.

In 2015 Scime won the Canadian Music Centre Toronto Emerging Composer Award.

Scime became an associate of the Canadian Music Centre, and serves as music director for FAWN Chamber Creative in Toronto.
