= Helmut Kallmann =

German-Canadian musicologist

- Born: 7 August 1922; Berlin, Germany
- Died: 12 February 2012 (aged 89); Ottawa, Ontario, Canada
- Education: University of Toronto
- Occupation: Musicologist
- Spouse: Ruth Proctor (married 1955–1994)
- Writing career
- Subject: Canadian Music
- Notable awards: Canadian Music Council Medal, Canadian Music Council (1977), Order of Canada (1986), Friends of Canadian Music Award, Canadian Music Centre and the Canadian League of Composers (2006)

Helmut Max Kallmann CM (7 August 1922 – 12 February 2012) was a Canadian musicologist, music educator, librarian, and scholar of Canadian music history. He was a librarian at the Canadian Broadcasting Corporation, head of the music division at Library Archives Canada, and co-founder of the Canadian Music Library Association.

== Early life and education ==
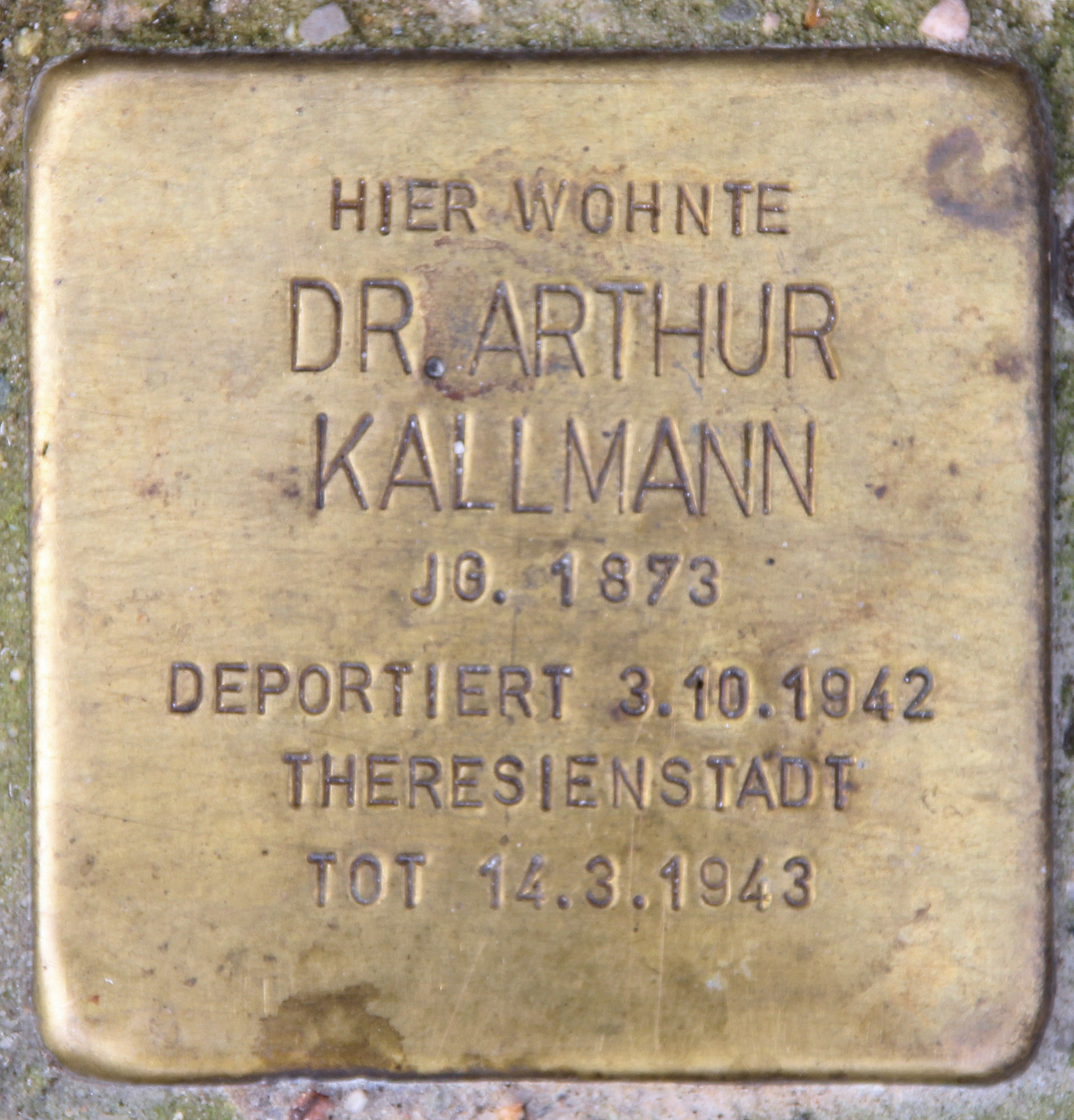
Arthur Kallmann

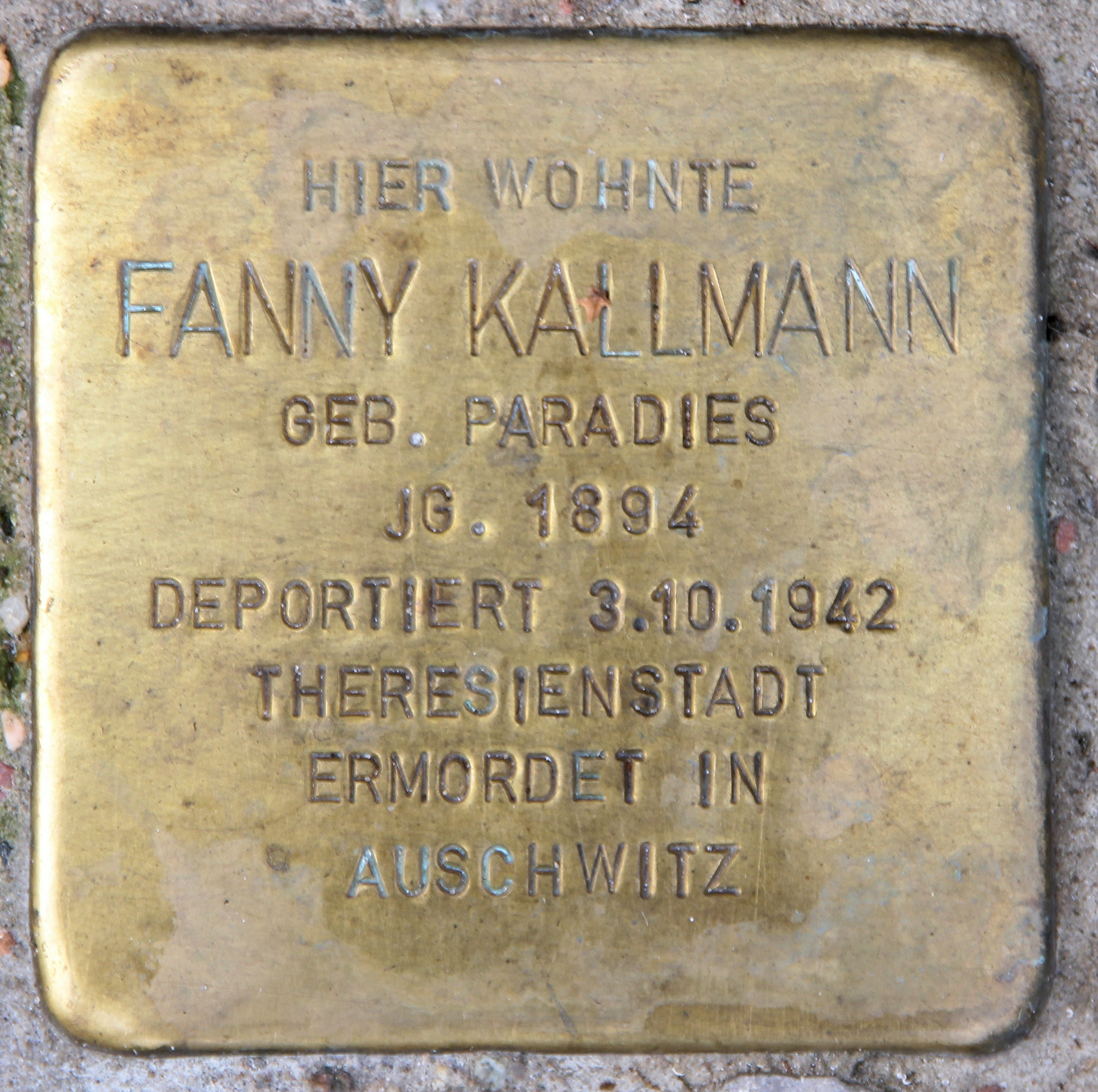
Fanny Kallmann (born Paradies)

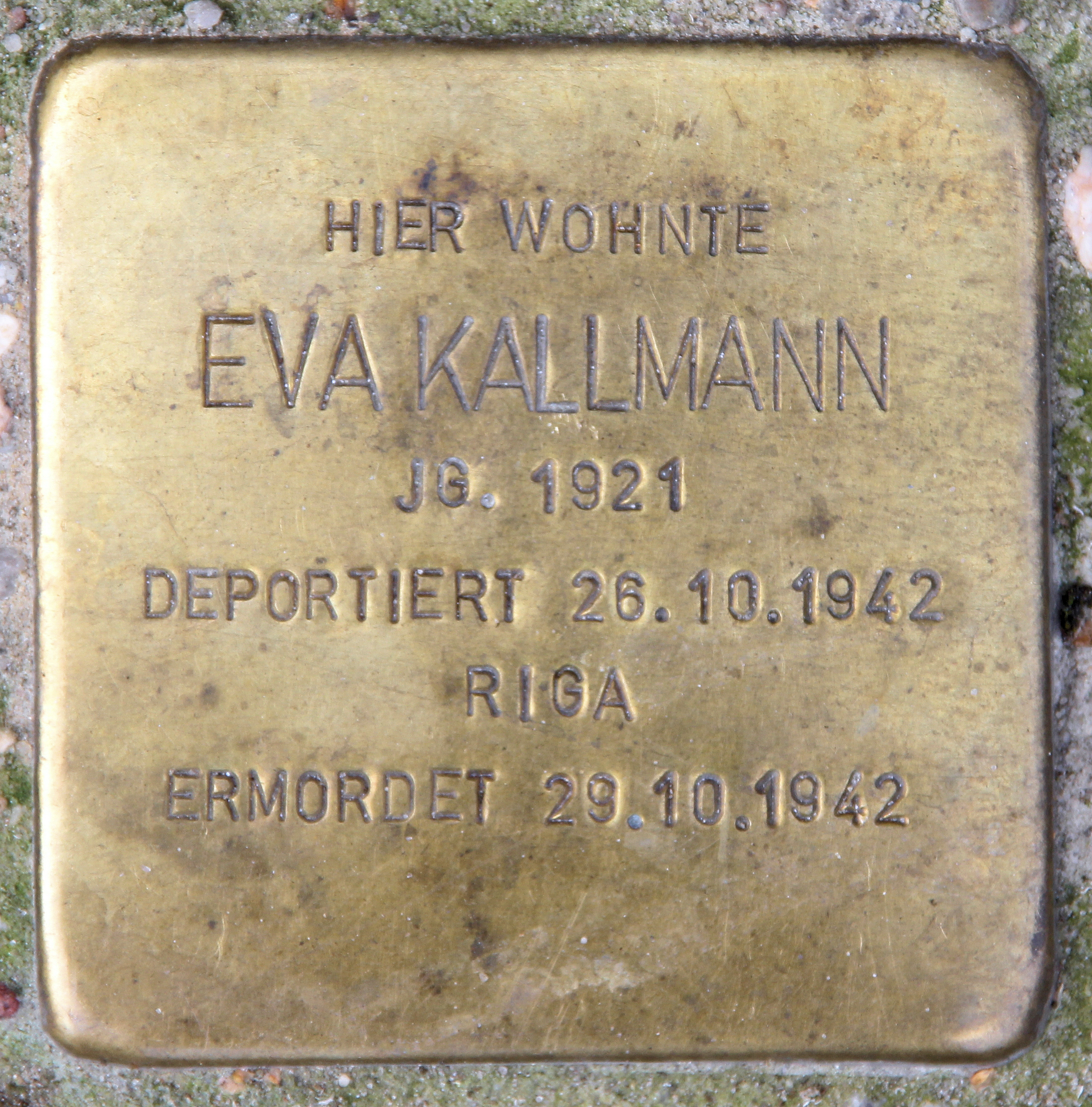
Eva Kallmann

Stolpersteine for his Father, mother, and older sister Eva (Geisbergstraße 41, Berlin-Schöneberg, Germany)

Kallmann was born in Berlin in 1922, the son of Jewish parents, Arthur and Fanny Kallmann. Urged by Helmut's teacher, the family sent Kallmann to London as part of the Kindertransport rescue mission in 1939. His mother, father and older sister Eva were unable to get the necessary papers to leave Germany, and were murdered in the Holocaust.

In London, Kallmann studied piano with Margery Moore and music theory with Russell E. Chester. He was free to study until May 1940, when he was rounded up as an "enemy alien" and taken to Canada. He arrived in Quebec City, Canada in 1940 on board the MS Sobieski, part of a convoy of 2,000 other "prisoners of war". He was held in a series of internment camps, first near Fredericton, New Brunswick, then Farnham, Quebec, Sherbrooke, Quebec, and finally Ile aux Noix, Quebec. While at Sherbrooke, Kallmann passed an external examination in harmony and counterpoint from McGill University. In 1943, a Jewish family in Toronto agreed to sponsor him. He moved to Toronto, working first for an accountancy firm, and then at Coles bookstore, while studying piano and finishing high school. Kallmann became a naturalized Canadian in 1946. In Toronto, he studied piano with Naomi Adaskin, Greta Kraus (1944–45), and Florence Steinhauer (1947–48).

Kallmann enrolled in the University of Toronto, Faculty of Music. On the recommendation of Arnold Walter, he chose the recently launched School Music program. He studied with Richard Johnston, Robert Rosevear, Arnold Walter and Leo Smith, completing his B.Mus. in 1949. When Kallman noticed that Canadian composers were rarely covered in the curriculum, he began to gather information on Canadian composers and their published compositions, work that continued throughout his lifetime.

== Career ==
Kallmann worked in the Toronto Music Library of the Canadian Broadcasting Corporation from 1950 to 1970, becoming the library supervisor in 1962. While there, he built an archive of some 1,000 Canadian compositions. In 1960, he published A History of Music in Canada 1534–1914.

In 1970, Kallmann became the head of the newly created music division of the National Library of Canada, now Library and Archives Canada. He led the building and preserving of a broad collection of musical Canadiana: printed material, manuscripts and recordings. With Gilles Potvin and Kenneth Winters, he edited the first edition of the Encyclopedia of Music in Canada, released in English in 1981 and in French in 1983. At almost 1,100 pages, the English edition was the largest book that University of Toronto Press had published up to that time. Kallmann retired from the library in 1987, and he and Potvin edited the second edition of the encyclopedia, released in 1992.

With Clifford Ford, Elaine Keillor and others, Kallmann helped form the Canadian Musical Heritage Society, serving as its chair for much of its existence.

In 1975, Carleton University appointed Kallmann an honorary adjunct professor, later an adjunct research professor. As recently as 2006–2007, he and Keillor were teaching graduate courses in Canadian music. In his memory, the university has established a fund for the Helmut Kallmann Chair in Canadian Music.

== Awards and honours ==
The University of Toronto granted Kallmann an honorary doctorate in 1971. He was awarded the Canadian Music Council Medal in 1977. He was appointed a Member of the Order of Canada in 1986.

The Helmut Kallmann Award for Distinguished Service relating to music libraries and archives in Canada was established by the Canadian Association of Music Libraries in 2000. In 2006, he was the first librarian to receive the Friends of Canadian Music Award, given by the Canadian Music Centre and the Canadian League of Composers.

In 2018, Carleton University announced the creation of the Helmut Kallmann Chair for Music in Canada, an endowed chair that will work with undergraduate and graduate students and research topics of Canadian music. The position received significant funding from Carleton Distinguished Research Professor Elaine Keillor as well as The Koerner Foundation.

== Selected bibliography ==
- "Canadian music as a field for research", The Toronto Conservatory of Music Bulletin, March 1950.
- Catalogue of Canadian Composers (Revised, enlarged ed.). Toronto: Canadian Broadcasting Corporation. 1952.
- "Kanada". Die Musik in Geschichte und Gegenwart (MGG). Vol. 7. Kassel: Bärenreiter. 1958. pp. 499–507.
- A History of Music in Canada 1534-1914. Toronto: University of Toronto Press. 1987 [1960, 1969, with amendments 1987].
- "The Music Collection of the National Library of Canada." Fontes Artis Musicae, vol. 34, no. 4, 1987, pp. 174–184. https://www.jstor.org/stable/23507508?seq=1
- "Mapping Canada's Music: A Life's Task", in Music in Canada/La Musique au Canada, Vol 1, ed. Guido Bimberg (Bochum 1997).
- Beckwith, John; Elliott, Robin, eds. (2013). Mapping Canada's Music: Selected Writings of Helmut Kallmann. Waterloo, Ontario: Wilfrid Laurier University Press. ISBN 978-1554588916.
