= Biographies of Frédéric Chopin =

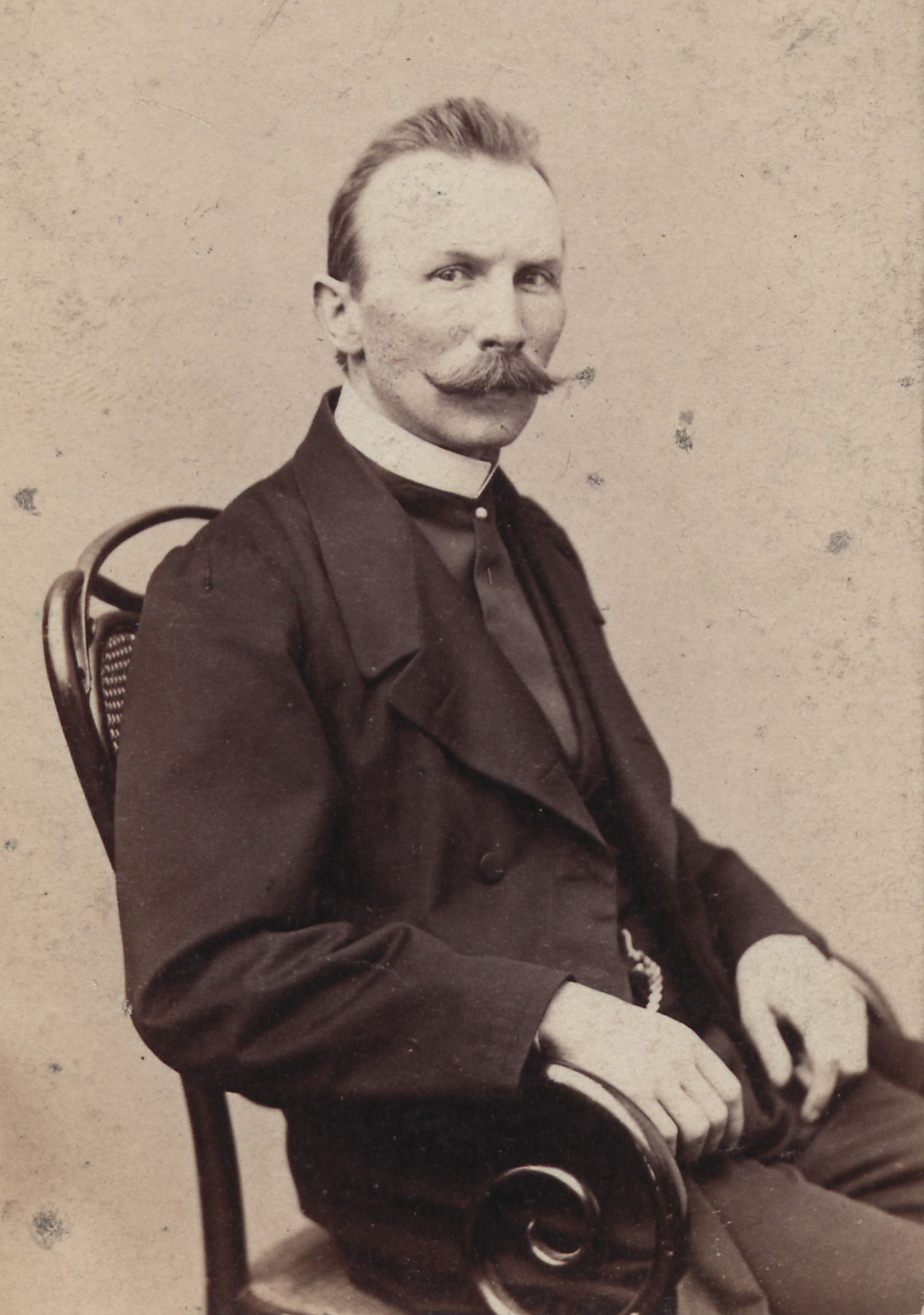
Maurycy Karasowski, one of Chopin's early biographers

By the first decades of the 21st century, over a hundred biographies of Frédéric Chopin had been published.

== Full biographies ==
Book-length biographies of Chopin's entire life include:

- Liszt, Franz (1852). F. Chopin (in French). Leipzig: Breitkopf & Härtel.
  - — (1880). Life of Chopin. Translated by Cook, Martha Walker [at Wikisource] (4th ed.) – via Project Gutenberg.
  - — (1890). F. Chopin (in French) (4th ed.). Leipzig: Breitkopf et Haertel – via Project Gutenberg.
- Karasowski, Maurycy (first name in German: Moritz):
  - — (1877). Friedrich Chopin: Sein Leben, seine Werke und Briefe (in German). Dresden: Ries. (2 vols.)
  - — (1878). Friedrich Chopin: Sein Leben und seine Briefe (in German) (2nd, reworked and enlarged ed.). Dresden: Ries.
  - — (1879). Frederick Chopin: His Life, Letters, and Works. Translated by Hill, Emily. London: Reeves. (2 vols.)
- Niecks, Frederick (1888). Frederick Chopin: As a Man and Musician. Novello, Ewer & Co.
  - Volume I
  - Volume II
- Zamoyski, Adam (1979). Chopin: A Biography. London: Collins. ISBN 0002160897. OCLC 5948326.
  - — (1980). Chopin: A New Biography. Garden City, N.Y.: Doubleday. ISBN 0385135971. OCLC 639395617.
  - — (2010). Chopin: Prince of the Romantics (revised digital ed.). London: HarperCollins. ISBN 9780007351824. OCLC 891811930.
- Walker, Alan (2018). Fryderyk Chopin: A Life and Times. Farrar, Straus and Giroux. ISBN 9780374714376.

== Partial biographies ==
Book-length biographies concentrating on a limited number of episodes in Chopin's life include:

- Szulc, Tad (1998). Chopin in Paris: The Life and Times of the Romantic Composer. New York: Scribner. ISBN 978-0-684-82458-1.
- Eisler, Benita (2007) [2003]. Chopin's Funeral. Knopf Doubleday. ISBN 9780307425256.

== Collections of primary documents ==
Bundled primary documents, such as letters and diaries, pertaining to Chopin's life include:

- Chopin's Letters (1931).
  - Based on Henryk Opieński's collection
  - Translations by Ethel Voynich
- Selected Correspondence of Fryderyk Chopin (1962).
  - Based on Bronisław Edward Sydow's collection
  - Translations by Arthur Hedley
- Chopin's Polish Letters (2016). ISBN 9788364823190.
  - Published by the Fryderyk Chopin Institute.
  - Translations by David Frick

== Sources ==
- Driver, Paul (5 April 1998). "Heartless Romantic: A biography of Chopin finds the dark side of the composer". The New York Times.
- Helman-Bednarczyk, Zofia (December 2016). "The New Edition of Chopin's Correspondence". Musicology Today. 13 (1). De Gruyter Open: 3–20. doi:10.1515/muso-2016-0009.
- Milewski, Barbara (April 2019). "Book Review: Fryderyk Chopin, Chopin's Polish Letters, trans. David Frick". Nineteenth-Century Music Review. 16 (1). Cambridge University Press: 108–113. doi:10.1017/S147940981700074X. S2CID 188813839.
- Miller, Lucasta (21 June 2003). "The composer who never grew up". The Guardian.
- Pekacz, Jolanta (April 2019). "Fryderyk Chopin: A Life and Times. By Alan Walker. New York: Farrar, Straus and Giroux, 2018. 727 pp. ISBN 9780374159061". CAML Review. 47 (1): 51–52.
- Smaliek, William; Trochimczyk, Maja (2015). "Biographies". Fréderic Chopin: A Research and Information Guide (2nd ed.). New York and London: Routledge. pp. 7–13, 96–105. ISBN 9780415998840.
