= Claremont Square =

Square in Islington, London, England

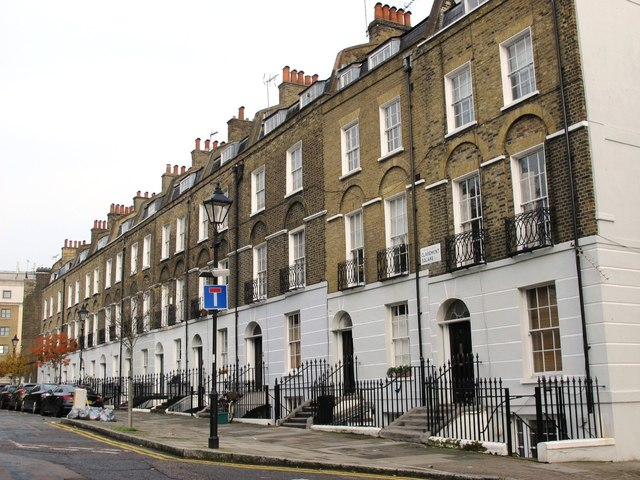
- Claremont Square, south side

- Location within London Borough of Islington
- Postal code: N1
- Coordinates: 51°31′52″N 0°6′37″W

Construction
- Construction start: 1821
- Completed: 1828

Claremont Square is a square in the Angel (Pentonville) part of Islington, London. Its central green mound, covering a reservoir, is dotted with mature trees on all four embanked sides. It is lined on the south, east and west sides by early-19th-century houses, and on the north side, across Pentonville Road, by heavily recessed apartment/office buildings. It was developed in the 1820s by the New River Company around their then-open reservoir, the Upper Pond, which was covered over in 1856.

== History ==
The New River is a man-made water channel which carried drinking water for 20 mi (32 km) to London from the Chadwell and Amwell Springs near Ware in Hertfordshire. It opened in 1613 and fed reservoirs in Islington.

The New River Company, which managed the New River until 1904, owned a large estate at the top of the Islington Hill, and in 1709 constructed a forerunner to today's covered reservoir in the square, known variously as the Upper Pond, High Pond, or New Reservoir. Water was pumped to the Upper Pond from the Round Pond at New River Head, providing a higher head of water which could be supplied to the hilltop houses of the neighbouring Pentonville and New River estates. The open reservoir was initially used by anglers, but was subsequently surrounded by railings, and a privileged few were allowed to take garden walks. In 1757, following the formation of the New Road north of the reservoir (renamed Pentonville Road in 1857), it was enclosed by a high brick wall.

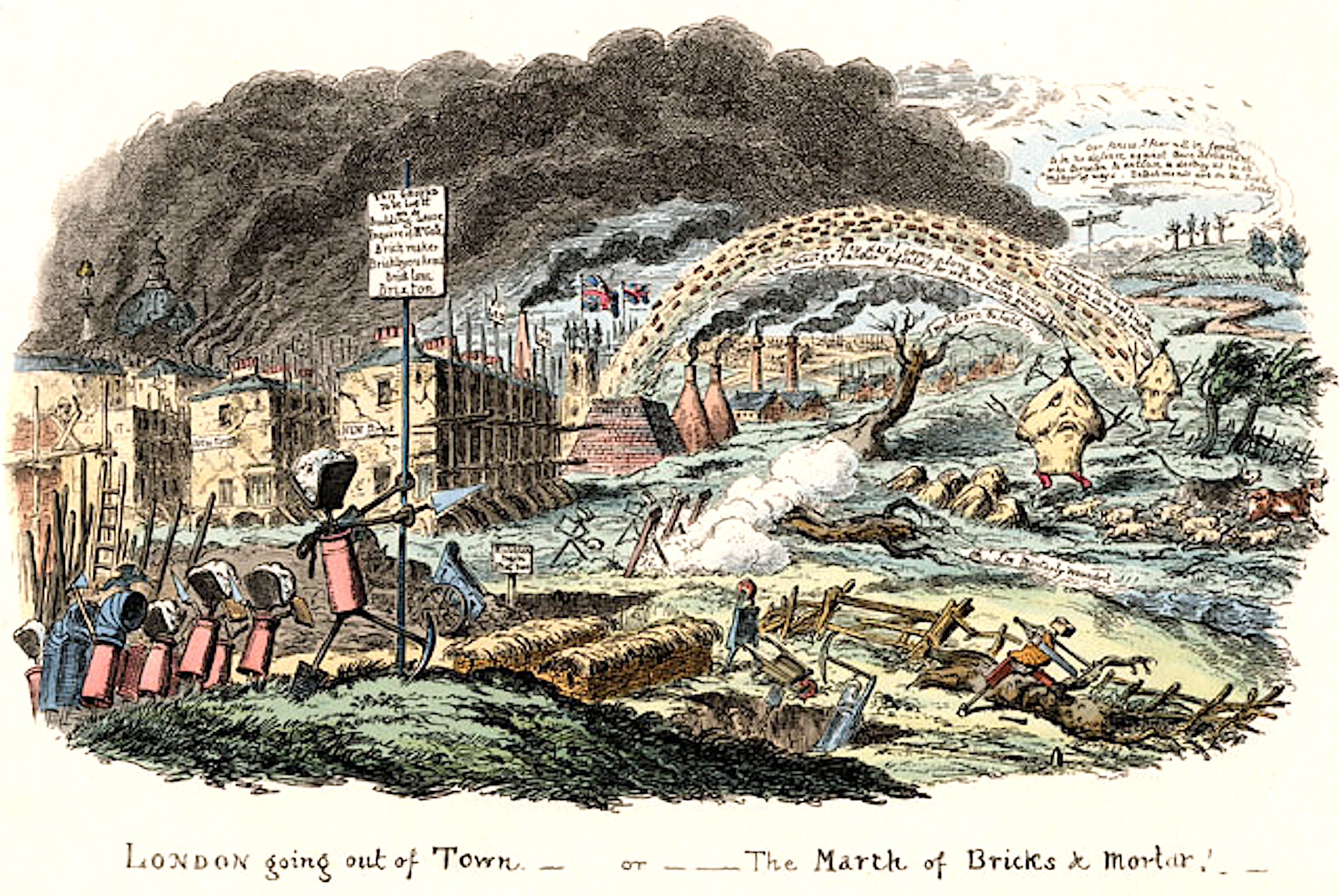
London Going out of Town – or The March of Bricks & Mortar!, George Cruikshank, 1829

During the period after the Napoleonic Wars, a rapid rise in population put a premium on building land contiguous to London. The area north of the New Road was fully developed as the suburb of Pentonville, and ground by the reservoir was the obvious place for the New River Company to begin development. The square (briefly known as River Square) was named after either an independent chapel opened in the New Road in 1819 or the adjacent terrace, which took its then-fashionable name Claremont from the country mansion where, in 1816, Princess Charlotte of Wales and Prince Leopold went to live after their marriage, and where the Princess died in childbirth in 1817.

Construction of the west side of the square commenced in 1821 and was initially called Myddelton Terrace (named after Sir Hugh Myddelton, the designer and constructor of the New River), leading into the later Amwell Street. The west and south sides were completed by 1828. When it was largely complete in 1827, it was described as "the greatest improvement the parish has received for many years", and occupancy began with the respectable middle-classes, such as merchants and clergymen. However, the houses were constructed by a myriad of speculators and builders, to varying standards of quality. It was while living in the square that the caricaturist George Cruikshank created his famous print London Going out of Town – or The March of Bricks & Mortar!, showing the construction of jerry-built suburbs on the open fields, seen from his window. After Thomas Carlyle had visited his friend Edward Irving who lived in the east terrace in 1824, he wrote in his Reminiscences that "it was a new place, houses bright and smart, but inwardly bad as usual".

The brick wall surrounding the open reservoir was replaced in 1826 by cast iron railings, charged to the lessees of the houses. However, "the residents of the north side not contributing their quota to the expense, a brick wall was rebuilt opposite to their houses", which still stands today on the Pentonville Road side.

Well off the south-east corner of the square lay stabling and homes for stablemen's families in Claremont Mews.

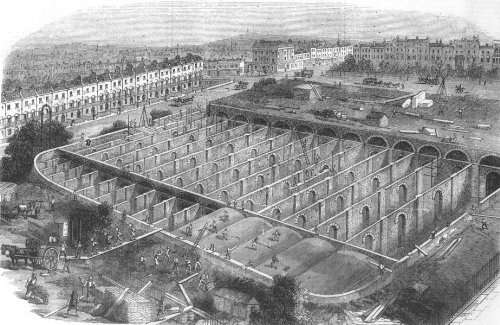
The New River Company's new covered reservoir, under construction in November 1856

The Metropolis Water Act of 1852 provided that all London reservoirs should be "roofed in or covered over" within five years, and so in 1856 the Upper Pond was drained, deepened, and lined with tall walls. The new brick-lined reservoir was enclosed by massive walls up to eight feet thick, built within the sides of the old pond to allow a 21 ft (6.4 m) depth of water over an area about 180 ft (55 m) square, holding about 3.5 million gallons (16 million litres). It was then covered and buffered by tree-lined and turfed embankments at a cost of £21,000. "A few melancholy sheep" were grazed there, before going to the slaughterhouse.

In the 1890s the square was "a noted residence of medical students". Charles Booth’s poverty map of c. 1890 shows most Claremont Square households as "Middle class. Well-to-do."

== Claremont Square in the 20th and 21st centuries ==
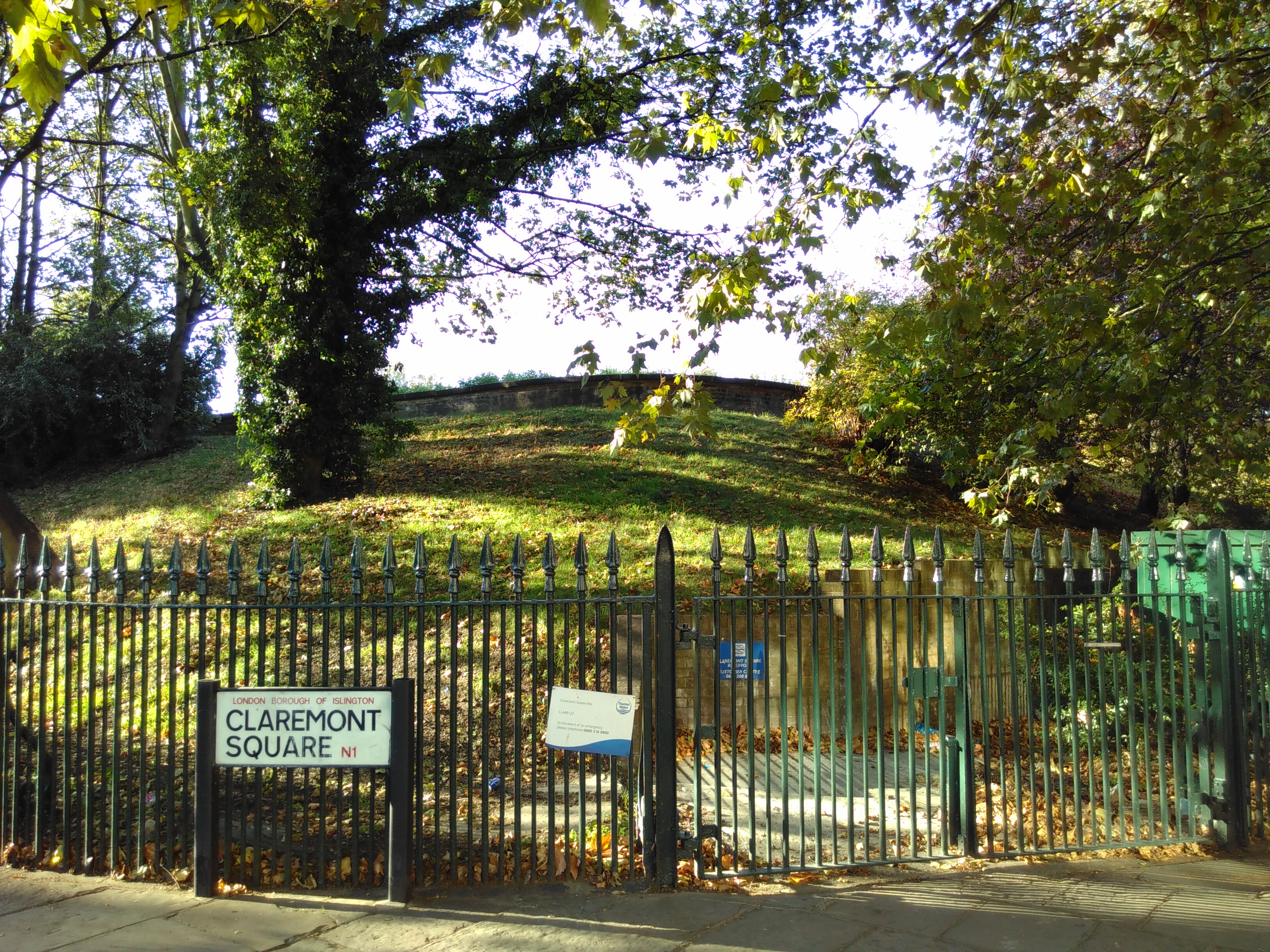
Claremont Square's covered reservoir, seen from the north eastern corner

In the first half of the 20th century the square, as with much of Islington and its population, became impoverished. The New River Company undertook many flat-conversions, starting in 1935–1936. In the 1970s, the estate was acquired by Islington Council as part of a conservation area, and a systematic conversion and rehabilitation programme was carried out in the late 1970s and into the early 1980s, with some houses converted laterally into self-contained flats. Unfortunately, during the building process many pretty features of the house were lost, such as fanlights and Gothick cupboards. Following Right to Buy legislation some homes were sold, and a few divided houses have been taken back into single or double occupation.

Claremont Mews was demolished to become a close, on land taken from gardens, and has been redeveloped as a green circus or garden square with 48 purpose-built flats.

The reservoir fell into disuse in the 1990s, but was brought back into service in 2003 to provide a header tank or balancing reservoir for the Thames Water Ring Main, filling at night and emptying during the day. Thames Water has exclusive access and takes charge of repairs, cutting and planting, assisted by volunteer projects and residents' information. The semi-improved grassland on the top and sides of the reservoir supports a wide diversity of wild flowers and is a preserved habitat.

South of Pentonville Road, the opening between the sides of the square in total measures 2.52 acres (1.02 ha), of which 1.72 acres (0.70 ha) is the green area with its directly adjoining thin pavements.

== Architecture ==
Mary Cosh observes:

The intrusive central mound over the former reservoir, and the cutting off of the north side by Pentonville Road's traffic artery, prevented Claremont's being a 'true' square, but its harmonious style makes it one of Islington's most elegant.

The houses have square-headed first floor windows in a sunken semi-circular brick surround. Many have ironwork balconies or window-guards, some have stuccoed ground floors simulating rustication, with the front usually framed by pilasters and crowned with fanlights. The original street-side railings have a mixed set of pointed finials. Most of the houses are listed buildings.

== Notable residents ==
- Edward Irving, preacher, lived at 4 Claremont Square for a few years from 1824. A blue plaque records his residency. His close friend Thomas Carlyle, essayist and historian, stayed with him for a few weeks in 1824.
- George Cruikshank, caricaturist, lived at three different addresses around the square in 1824–1849.
- Emily Soldene, singer, actress, theatre director, was born in Claremont Square on 30 September 1838.
- Agnes Nicholls, soprano, was born at 3 Claremont Square in 1876.
- Walter Sickert, artist, lodged in the square in 1877–1881.
- Robert Kemp Philp, Chartist and editor, died at 21 Claremont Square on 30 November 1882.
- Margery Moore, musician, composer and teacher, lived at 34 Claremont Square between the 1930s and 1960s.
- B. S. Johnson, writer, lived at 34 Claremont Square, probably in the 1960s.

== TV and film ==
The Harry Potter film series uses 23–29 Claremont Square as 12 Grimmauld Place.

No. 33 is the filming location for the fictitious 35 Portland Row in the Netflix adaption of Lockwood & Co.
