= Margery Moore =

British composer, pianist and pedagogue

Margery Moore is the professional name of Lilian/Lillian Margery Moore (1907 – 1993). She was a British musician – composer, pianist, pedagogue – who flourished in London in the 1930s and 1940s. The majority of her works were published by the London firm of Novello, with some published by other London firms: Boosey and Hawkes, Curwen, and Stainer and Bell.

== Biography ==
Margery Moore was born in the UK town of Birkenhead, the daughter of Thomas Moore (b. c. 1868), originally of Shenley in Hertfordshire, a 'railway employee', and his wife Catherine (b. c. 1877) originally of Beverley, East Yorkshire. By 1911 the family were living in Plymouth at 6 Green Bank Avenue.

In Plymouth Margery took piano lessons from a Miss F. Faull, under whose aegis in January 1918 she took to the platform in a concert in Devonport, Plymouth to raise funds for the Red Cross. One reviewer described her as "a clever young pianist".

In 1924 she passed the Royal Academy of Music licentiate examination (LRAM) in piano performance.

In 1929, on 14 September, she was awarded Durham University's Mus. Bac. degree as an external (corresponding) student. Her examination 'exercise' was a string quartet in D-minor. The university records show that by this date she had moved from Devon to Toynbee Hall, 28 Commercial Street, London.

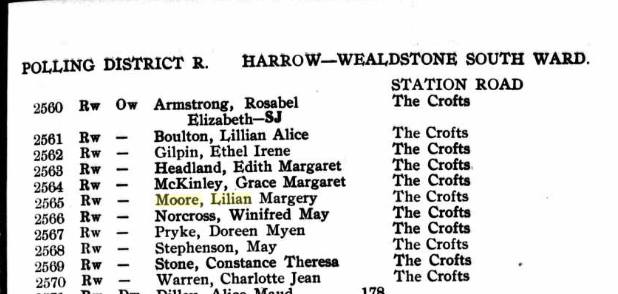
Margery Moore shown residing at The Crofts School in the Harrow Electoral Register of 1935.

By 1935 Margery Moore was a resident teacher at The Crofts, a school for girls in Station Road, Harrow.

In 1935–36 Margery Moore was recorded as a member of the Union of Music Graduates, which aimed to oppose the granting of spurious music degrees.

In 1936 Margery Moore published a series of four polemical essays in The Musical Times on the subject of piano teaching under the general title Some Problems of the Young Piano Teacher: 1. Children; 2. Adult Beginners; 3. Parents; 4. The Teacher.

From October to December 1936 a short series of advertisements appeared in The Musical Times in which Margery Moore offered her services as an editor for amateur composers at the cost of 1s per manuscript.

In July 1938 Margery Moore published another article in The Musical Times concerning piano pedagogy entitled Concerning the Piano Class.

The period 1933–38 was when Margery Moore was most active in having her compositions published, much of it focussed on music for schools.

In 1939, already a lecturer with the London County Council, working at Toynbee Hall, and also on the staff of the East Sheen County School for Girls, she found time to teach piano to a teenage German émigré called Helmut Kallmann (1922–2012), prior to his emigration to Canada (1940) where he became a pioneering music historian.

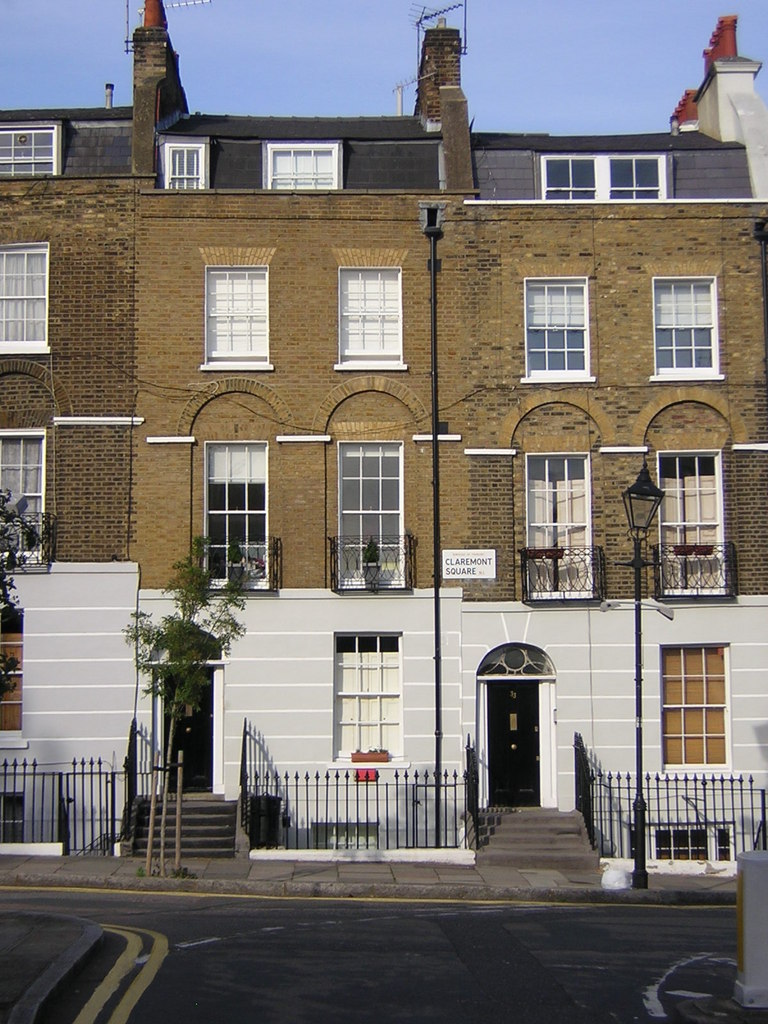
34 Claremont Square, London N1 9LS

At some point before 1939 and until at least 1960 Margery Moore lived at 34 Claremont Square, Islington. At first she lived there with her parents – Thomas aged 68 and Catherine aged 67 – and Roland DeRougemont, then a member of the Auxiliary Fire Service aged 27 and whom she married in 1940.

In September 1944 Margery was appointed to teach a musical appreciation class at the Technical Institute, Richmond, Surrey. The same month she also took up a post with the Workers Educational Association, Guildford branch, to teach music appreciation on Wednesday evenings.

At some point before 1953 Margery and Roland divorced; he remarried in 1953 to Valerie Rampton.

The last mention of Margery Moore living in Claremont Square is found in the 1960 electoral register in which she appears as the sole occupant of number 34. She is also listed at 34 Claremont Square in the 1960 London telephone directory; the only Margery Moore in the directory. In 1961 the only Margery Moore in the London telephone directory is listed at 11 Canfield Gardens NW6. After this date and until the end of printed directories (after 1984) - as well as electoral registers - there is no identifiable reference to the musician Margery Moore until 1993.

In 1993 Margery Moore was living in residential care at The Chestnuts, Cambridge Park Road, Wanstead. She died in Whipps Cross Hospital, Leytonstone on 19 March 1993 resulting from 'myocardial infarction'. On her death-certificate she is described as 'Music Teacher (retired)'.

== BBC broadcasts ==
- 1924, Friday 3 October 1924, 19:30 on 5PY Plymouth
  - Margery Moore and Marion Clingan, piano duet - Spanish Dance [from op.12?] by Moritz Moszkowski; Polonaise [in Eb B.100?] by Antonin Dvorak.
- 1925, Friday 6 Mar 1925, 20:45 on 5PY Plymouth
  - Margery Moore, piano - "Play of the Waters" [Jeux d'eau] by Maurice Ravel.
- 1929, Tuesday 9 October, 19:45 on 5PY Plymouth.
  - A Chamber Music Concert. The Margery Moore Quartet (Sylvia Hill, vioiin 1; Christina McCleod (violin 2; Margery Moore, viola; Margor Read, 'cello.

== Composing ==
=== Choral ===
- 1933 – Ceremonies of Christmas, Words by Robert Herrick.
- 1935 – Laughing Song. (Three-part song. S.S.A.), Words by William Blake.
There are still pretty words to be found in poets some of whose work has been over-set. Margery Moore has taken Blake's 'Laughing Song' (' When the green woods laugh with the voice of joy'), and fitted it with S.S.A. music that, thrown off at the right speed, and with real mirth in the 'Ha ha' bits (so many singers get solemn, and forget to smile), would make a charming short item. C is the lowest note in the alto part, but for one A . "The Musical Times", January 1936.
- 1935 – Teach me, my God and King. (Hymn-Anthem for unison singing. Series: Novello School Songs No. 1729), words by G. Herbert.
- 1935 – The Wise Men (Novello Christmas Carols by Modern Composers No 512).
- 1936 – A Little Child's Song (S.S), words by Muriel Rodney. Series: Novello's Music for Sunday School Festivals No. 121.
A tuneful work for two voices. The second voice is sometimes singing above the first, and both are of equal interest. There is a contrasted middle verse and the freely written accompaniment is well varied . "The Musical Times" January 1937.
- 1936 – For ever England : unison song for massed choirs.
- 1936 – Magic! (unison song), words by Muriel Rodney.
- 1936 – The Carol of the White Rose. (Novello Christmas Carols by Modern Composers No 515)
- 1936 – The Unkind Maid : S.A.T.B.
- 1936 – The Valiant Knight (Unison). Series: Novello's Music for Sunday School Festivals No. 122.
A song for boys, 'The Valiant Knight,' words by Peter Brett, has a good tune, suitably bold and direct, which should make a ready appeal . "The Musical Times" January 1937.
- 1937 – Fear no more the Heat of the Sun (part-Song for S.A.A.T.B.), words by William Shakespeare.
- 1937 – Trotting. (Unison song for junior boys), words by Muriel Rodney.

=== Instrumental solo ===
- 1937 – Country Tune (for violin and piano).

=== Instrumental ensemble ===
- 1929 – String Quartet in D-minor; Durham University BMus examination exercise.
- 1936 – A Little Christmas Piece. (For violins and piano. Series: Elementary and School Orchestra Series for Violon and Piano. Grade Two. No. 11).
- 1935 – A Suite of Four Pieces: for school percussion band (piano, triangles, cymbals, tambourines, drums).
- 1935 – Children's Suite 1. Gyp's Courante. 2. Rosemary's Sarabande. 3. Barbara's Minuet. 4. Nell's Gavotte. 5. Michael's Bouree (for strings and piano).

=== Opera ===
- 1932 – Drake. Libretto by W. G. Lennox.

=== Organ ===
- 1932 - Allegretto. Novello's Selected Pieces for the Organ. Vol. 4 (1932) NB Mo.5 of "Five Little Organ Studies"
- 1934 – Five Little Organ Studies: 1/ Allegretto; 2/ Andante; 3/ Allegro; 4/ Presto; 5/ Allegretto.
The composer described the music thus: "These Studies have been specially written for organ students in the earlier stages. It is assumed that such students have already a sufficient keyboard dexterity: the Studies are designed to assist them in the essentials of organ playing—the use of more than one manual, the management of stops, and the technique of the pedals." A reviewer noted: It is a pleasure to welcome a new and accomplished hand [...] The studies have real musical value: many less attractive things are used as voluntaries and recital items. The composer's happy management of three-part writing is a feature. "The Musical Times" December 1934.
- 1934 – Herzliebster Jesu; Vater unser : two chorale preludes.
The first is in the Bach manner, yet with points of originality.The melody is given to a Great solo stop in the tenor, between flowing passages on the Choir Gedact in the same register; the accompaniment consists of Swell chords (with a figure that recalls the 'spirit in heaviness' theme of Bach) and a pedal chiefly of repeated quavers, with occasional allusions to the figure. The scheme is well-managed, with deeply expressive results. The 'Vater Unser' piece is a genuinely original conception, in which the melody is soloed on the a Great as a constituent in a fine polyphonic texture. There is some bold harmony, a real climax is achieved midway, and the piece, short as it is, leaves a powerful impression. The composer has evidently gone to school in the best of company, and to some purpose. She has ideas, and writes like a composer who is also a player. Her future work will be looked forward to by all who have an instinctive sense for work that is really individual. "The Musical Times" December 1934.
- 1935 – English March.
Margery Moore has already attracted a good deal of favourable attention by a pair of striking chorale preludes and some well-written easy studies. Her 'English March' shows that she is ale also to write in popular style. March is modal in character, and mainly staccato. […] The piece is really an alla marcia postlude . "The Musical Times" March 1935.
- 1936 – Two pieces for the organ : Pastoral [and] Paean.

=== Piano ===
- 1936 – The Merry Midshipman : a book for boys. Four short pieces.
- 1937 – Air on the G string / J, S. Bach ; arranged for two Pianos.
- 1938 – The Piping Shepherds : four little pieces.
These pieces are amongst the most expressive miniatures written for the piano in recent years. Brimful of invention, with pleasing rhythmic melodies, they have live part-writing and an attractive, wistful tenderness . From an advertisement in "The Musical Times". September 1938.
