= Canadian Association of Music Libraries, Archives and Documentation Centres =

Association of music librarians

- Association canadienne des bibliothèques, archives et centres de documentation musicaux
- Abbreviation: CAML/ACBM
- Formation: 1971
- Type: Library Association
- Region served: Canada
- Official language: English; French
- Website: www.caml-acbm.org

The Canadian Association of Music Libraries, Archives and Documentation Centres (CAML; French: Association canadienne des bibliothèques, archives et centres de documentation musicaux, ACBM) is a national association that represents music librarians across Canada. The organization aims to support all aspects of music librarianship in Canada, including research and scholarship, and to cooperate with other national and international organizations concerned with music.

CAML is the Canadian branch of the International Association of Music Libraries, Archives and Documentation Centres (IAML).

The association archives are held at Library and Archives Canada.

== History ==
The association was preceded by the Canadian Music Library Association (CMLA), which was a section of the Canadian Library Association founded in 1956. In 1971, the association was reconstituted as the Canadian Association of Music Libraries, and in 1992 the name was changed to the Canadian Association of Music Libraries, Archives and Documentation Centres.

== Activities ==
=== Annual meetings ===
The association meets annually, often with the Canadian University Music Society (MusCan) and the Congress Federation for Humanities and Social Sciences. The first IAML meeting to be held in Canada took place in Montreal in 1975.

=== Cataloguing Committee ===
The Cataloguing Committee is responsible for giving advice on proposed rule changes as brought forward by the Canadian Committee on Cataloguing, which is a national advisory committee on matters of cataloguing and bibliographic control. The Cataloguing Committee also communicates information to members about developments in the field of music cataloguing.

=== Collections Committee ===
The Collections Committee begin as the Collection Development Interest Group in 2016 by Houman Behzadi. It was established as a committee in 2017.

=== RILM/CAML Committee ===
This committee is responsible for abstracting Canadian music publications, which are then added to the Répertoire International de Littérature Musicale (RILM) database. In addition to monographs and doctoral dissertations, the RILM Canada Committee abstracts the following journals:

Primary:

- Canadian journal of music therapy/Revue canadienne de musicothérapie
- Intersections: Canadian journal of music
- Les cahiers de la Société québécoise de recherche en musique
- Musicological explorations
- Studies in music from the University of Western Ontario

Secondary:

- CAML review
- Canadian music educator
- Canadian winds: The journal of the Canadian Band Association/Vents canadiens : Revue de l'Association canadienne de l'harmonie
- Opera Canada
- Recherche en éducation musicale au Québec

== CAML Review ==
CAML began publishing a journal in 1972 entitled Newsletter/Nouvelles. The title was changed to CAML Review / Revue de l'ACBM in 2001. Since 2006, CAML Review / Revue de l'ACBM has been published as an open access journal. The print version of CAML Review was discontinued in 2011. An index to volumes 1 - 38 of the CAML Newsletter and CAML Review was compiled by Kathleen McMorrow.

== Awards ==
CAML provides awards for conference attendance, participation, and research. In 1998, CAML established the Helmut Kallmann Award for excellence in music librarianship and archives work in Canada. The award is named after Dr Helmut Kallmann, chief of the music division at the National Library of Canada from 1970 until 1981. Dr. Kallmann was made an honorary member of the association in 1987. The Helmut Kallmann award is open to those who have made a substantial contribution to the preservation, development and/or research of Canadian music collections.

=== Kallmann Award past recipients ===
- Jane Ann Pearce Baldwin (2000)
- Maria Calderisi (2002)
- Dr Elaine Keillor (2004)
- Robin Elliott (2012)
- Daniel Paradis (2017)
- Brian Thompson (2022)
