= Veronika Krausas =

Canadian composer (born 1963)

Veronika Judita Krausas (born 1963) is a Canadian composer who lives and works in the United States.

== Biography ==
She was born in Sydney, Australia but grew up in Canada after the age of four. Her diplomas in music education and performance were completed at the Royal Conservatory of Music in Toronto, Ontario. She also completed a Bachelor of Commerce (marketing) degree at the University of Calgary (1985), a Bachelor of Music degree at the University of Toronto (1991), a master's degree at McGill University in Montreal (1995), and a doctorate from the University of Southern California in Los Angeles (2001), where she received the outstanding DMA in Composition award. In 2004 she won the Theodore Front Prize for her Concerto for Piano and Orchestra, one of the "Search for New Music awards" presented by The International Alliance for Women in Music (IAWM).

She is currently an Assistant Professor of Composition at the University of Southern California at the Thornton School of Music. She is also the Assistant Director of Undergraduate music theory at USC, on the advisory board of Jacaranda Music, an associate director of The Industry, a pre-concert lecturer at the Los Angeles Philharmonic orchestra, and an artist with Catalysis Projects.

== Music ==
Veronika's works have been performed in Canada, the United States, Australia, Germany (at the Darmstadt New Music Festival), Romania, and the Netherlands. Through her production company, Vera Ikon Productions, she has produced and composed music for yearly shows since her arrival in Los Angeles.

Her electronic work Waterland (with video by Quintan Ana Wikswo) received its European premiere in Lyon, France, in October 2010. A commission for the 25th Anniversary of the San Francisco Choral Artists and the Alexander String Quartet, using text by the poet Lawrence Ferlinghetti, was premiered in May 2011 in San Francisco.

== Works ==
Opera

- the mortal thoughts of lady macbeth (2001) for soprano, 2 mezzos, alto, 9 instruments, 22:00

Orchestral

- les reflets du chapeau claque de la lune ... (the glints of the moon's opera hat ...) (1996), full orchestra: 2(+picc)/2 (+EH)/2 (+bass)/2 (+contra); 4/3/2 (+bass)/1; timp; 3 perc; hrp; pno; strings, 9:42

Instrumental chamber music

- analemma (2006) for 11 musicians (flute, oboe, clarinet, trumpet, percussion, harp, piano, 2 violins, viola, cello), 14:00
- stone (1991) for solo double bass and narrator, 8:43
- us.we.are (2005) for solo cello, 7:00
- Inside the Stone for viola solo (1997)
- 5 intermezzi for 2 guitars (2003/4), 12:34
- cloisonne (2005) for solo double bass and film, 6:42
- il sole e l'altre stelle (2006) for string quartet, 6:30

Vocal chamber music

- midaregami (tangled hair) (2007) for string quartet and mezzo-soprano (premiere by the Penderecki String Quartet March 10, 2007, Toronto), 19:00
- Shade (2002, text by Molly Bendall, for soprano, recorder, clarinet, percussion and vocal tape, 12:00
- From Easter (2000), text by Andre Alexis (premiere September 2000 in Montreal & New Brunswick), soprano, horn, bass, percussion, 15:00

Piano

- Player Piano Project (February 12, 2008)

== Writings ==
- in + on (2006), photography book of graffiti and writings found in and on the streets of 20 cities around the world
- errata: a curious collection of corrections (2005), with Renee Reynolds

== Grants and commissions ==
- Motion Ensemble
- The Canada Council
- A Millennium Commissioning Grant
- Two Interdisciplinary Arts Initiative grants in Los Angeles

== Recordings ==
- Mnemosyne (2002) solo and chamber works, the Motion Ensemble
- The Music of Veronika Krausas (2002) compilation of orchestral, chamber and solo works
- FOOD: New Music for Guitar Duo (2005)

== Music and DVD publications ==
- The Bestiary/Le Bestaire (a collection of children’s piano pieces), Frederick Harris Music Publishers
- Catastrophe Apostrophe: A Trio of Curio Films by Quintan Ana Wikswo with the Music of Veronika Krausas (2010). DVD Published by Catalysis Projects.
