= Sylvia Rickard =

Canadian composer

Sylvia Rickard (born 19 May 1937) is a Canadian composer and pianist.

Rickard was born in Toronto, Ontario. She studied at the Toronto Conservatory, and received a teaching certificate and a B.A. in French and Russian from the University of British Columbia in Vancouver. She pursued graduate studies in French at Stanford University and the Universite de Grenoble. She lived in India and Germany until 1972, when she returned to Canada and studied music with Jean Coulthard.

Rickard won first prize in piano, as well as a chamber music prize, in the 1975 Okanagan Composers Festival. She was a resident composer in the 1999 Casalmaggiore International Chamber Music Festival in Italy. She is a member of the Association of Canadian Women Composers and the Society of Composers, Authors and Music Publishers of Canada (SOCAN), and the Victoria Composers Collective.

Rickard’s music is published by the Canadian Music Centre and Palliser Music Publishing.

- See a catalogue of Sylvia Rickard’s works.
- Listen to music by Sylvia Rickard.
