= Gilles Potvin =

Canadian historian

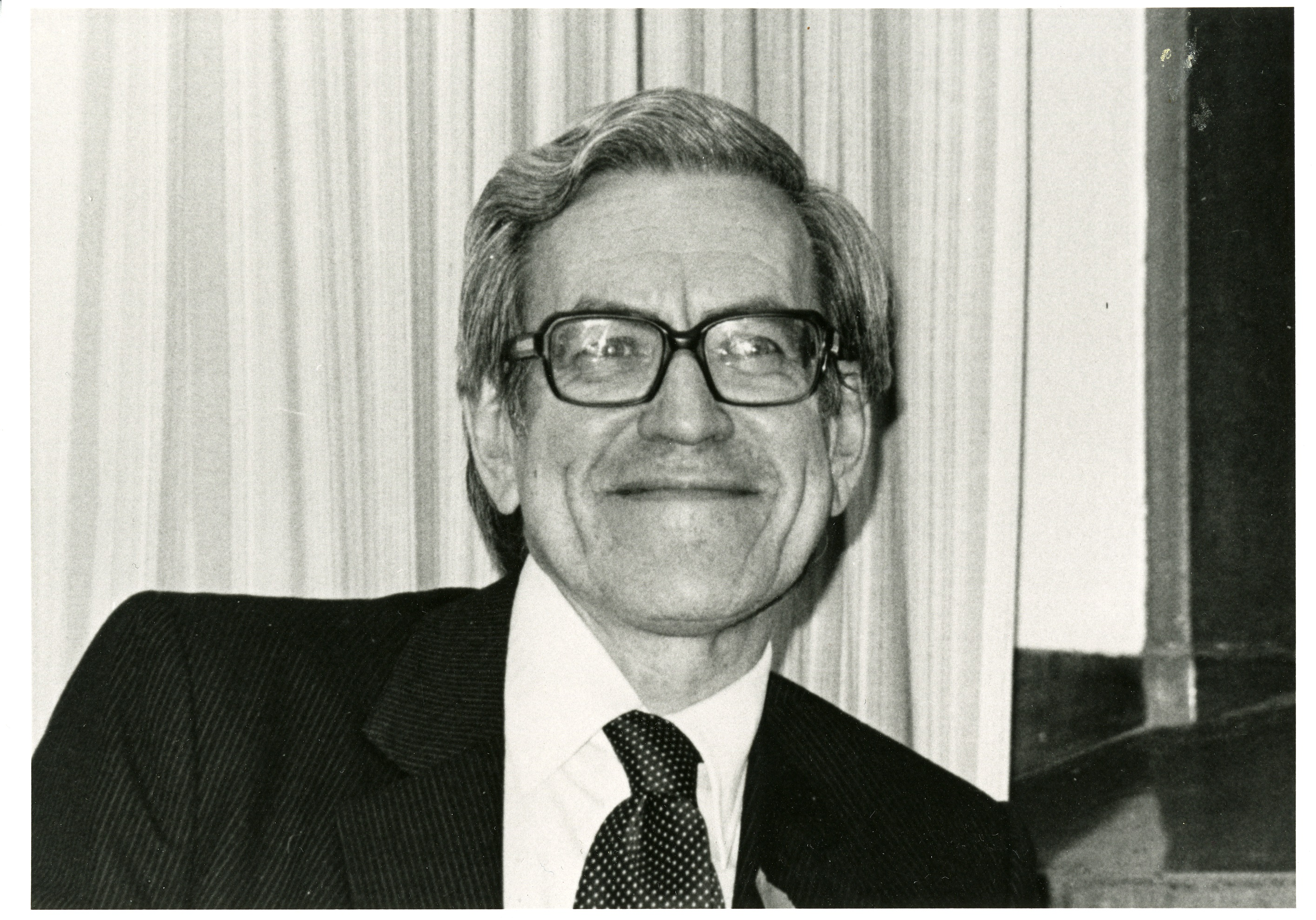
A picture of Gilles Potvin

Gilles Potvin, CM MSRC (23 October 1923 – 4 September 2000) was a Canadian music critic and music historian. Potvin was born in Montreal. He was a music critic for Le Devoir (1961–66, 1973–85) and La Presse (1966–70). From 1970 to 1976 he served as the editor of The Canada Music Book and from 1976 to 1980 he was President of the Jeunesses musicales du Canada. He was notably the co-editor, with Helmut Kallmann and Kenneth Winters, of The Encyclopedia of Music in Canada; also contributing more than 300 articles to that publication. He was a leading authority on the life and career of soprano Emma Albani and he translated the singer's autobiography into the French language (published 1972). For many years he wrote program notes for the Montreal Symphony Orchestra (MSO), and in 1984 he published a history of the MSO in the year of that orchestra's 50th anniversary.

For 42 years Potvin worked for the Canadian Broadcasting Corporation in a variety of roles, including record librarian, music consultant, producer, and head of music production for Radio Canada International. He also served as chief editor of the Anthology of Canadian Music collection compiled by the CBC. In 1949 founded the Minute Opera which performed chamber operas in Montréal for five seasons.

Potvin was the recipient of numerous awards and honors. In 1983 he was awarded the Calixa-Lavallée Award and in 1984 he was made both a Fellow of the Royal Society of Canada and a Member of the Order of Canada. In 1987 he received the Canadian Music Council Medal and in 1990 he was made an honorary member of the Canadian Music Centre. He married soprano Micheline Tessier in 1960.
