= Chan Ka Nin =

Canadian composer and music educator

- Born: 3 December 1949 (age 76); Hong Kong
- Education: University of British Columbia; Jacobs School of Music
- Occupations: composer, educator

Chan Ka Nin (born 3 December 1949) is a Canadian composer and music educator of Chinese descent. He became a naturalized Canadian citizen in 1971. He has been commissioned to write works for the Calgary Philharmonic Orchestra, the CBC Radio Orchestra, the Esprit Orchestra, the Manitoba Chamber Orchestra, the National Arts Centre Orchestra, New Music Concerts, the Quebec Contemporary Music Society, and Symphony Nova Scotia among many others. He has also been awarded funds to compose works by the Canada Council, Ontario Arts Council, Ontario's Ministry of Citizenship and Immigration, and the Toronto Arts Council. He has won two Juno Awards for Best Classical Composition.

Born and raised in Hong Kong, Chan immigrated with his family to Canada in 1965 at the age of 15. The family settled in Vancouver and after completion of high school, Chan entered the University of British Columbia where he studied music composition with Jean Coulthard while pursuing degrees in both music and electrical engineering. He graduated from the UBC in 1976 and proceeded to enter the graduate composition program at the Jacobs School of Music at Indiana University where he was a pupil of Bernhard Heiden. He earned both a Master of Music (1978) and a Doctor of Music (1983) from the school. In 1982 he pursued further studies in music composition at the Darmstädter Ferienkurse.

In 1982 Chan became a member of the music faculty at the University of Toronto where he continues to teach courses in music theory and composition to this day. He is an associate of the Canadian Music Centre and a member of the Canadian League of Composers.

He is married to Alice Ho, who is also a composer. The couple live in Toronto.

== Works ==
Opera

- Ice Time (2004)
- Iron Road (2001)
- The Weaving Maiden (2006)

Orchestra

- A Fantastic Journey (1992)
- Ecstasy (1987)
- Four Seasons Suite for Orchestra, The (1994)
- Flower Drum Song (1984)
- Goddess of Mercy (1976)
- The Land Beautiful (1988)
- Memento Mori (1998)
- Poetry on Ice (1995)
- Railway Suite (1998)
- Reflection (1984)
- Revelation (1984)
- Treasured Pasture Leisure Pleasure (1989)

Soloist(s) with Orchestra

- Daughter of Master Chin (1975)
- Gibora (1997), a concerto for viola & orchestra
- Concert Music for Four Horns (1980)
- Lullaby (1993)
- Pearl of Asia (1997) Co-Composer: Alice Ho
- Refuge (1998)
- Rise (1994)
- Railway Suite (1998)
- Soulmate (2001
- Three Folksongs (1998) arrangement

Symphonic Wind Ensemble

- Ecstasy for Band (1988)
- Foung (1978), for wind ensemble
- Memento Mori (1998-2003) for wind ensemble
- Rise (1997), for concert band

Chamber Music

- Fanfare for Dawn (2011)
- Pater Noster (2010)
- Hey Duke (2010)
- Pachelbel Variations (2010)
- The Consequential Web of Life (2010)
- Celebration of Life & Death (2008)
- Journeys (2009)
- Ambiance (1999)
- Among Friends (1989)
- and the masks evoke...(2000)
- Asia Pacific Fanfare (1997)
- Ave Maris Stella (2002)
- BA(N)FF (2003)
- BA(N)FF Fanfare (2003)
- Belonging (2000)
- Charmer, The (1994)
- Cool Mountain Water (2000)
- Cosmopolitan Suite (1988)
- Crystal Blue Persuasion (1996)
- Disquiet, The (1990)
- Ecstasy for Flutes (1987)
- Éveil aux Oiseaux (2005)
- Everlasting Voice (1981)
- Flute Octette (1984)
- Four Seasons Suite (1973)
- "I Think That I Shall Never See..." (1993)
- In Search of... (2004)
- Joy in Tranquillity (1975)
- Late in a Slow Time (2006)
- Lullaby (1993)
- Majestic Flair (1987)
- Miao Kong (2000)
- Musical Offering (1994)

- Mute Muse (1984)
- Mystique (1996)
- Nature/Nurture (2002)
- Nuage Precieux (1987)
- Our Finest Hour (1999)
- Phantasmagoria (1980)
- Piao (2006) Fl. & perc.
- Piao (2003) Fl. & pno
- Piao (2003-4) Vlc. & pno
- Prairie (1977)
- Par-ci, par-là (1996)
- Par-çi, par-là (2004)
- Promenade (1992)
- Reflection, for Solo Organ (1992)
- Reflection, for Solo Harp (1992)
- Reflection, for Solo Piano (1972)
- Rhythm of Life (1995)
- Rise (1994) (Version 1)
- Rise (1994) (Version 2)
- Rise (1994)
- Salmon Quintet, The (1992)
- Saxophone Quartet (1989)
- Star of the Sea (1996)
- Sonata for Piano (1972)
- Sonatina for Two Guitars (1973–83)
- Sound of Sound (2002)
- Soulmate (1995) solo vln.
- Soulmate (1995) solo vla.
- Soulmate (1995) solo vlc.
- Soulmate (1995) Solo vlc. & pno
- Spring Nest (1993)
- String Quartet No, 1 (1977)
- String Quartet No. 2 (1981)
- String Quartet No. 3 (1998)
- String Quartet No. 4 (2005)
- Tai Chi (1985)
- Tête à tête (2007)
- Three Movements for Clarinet and Piano (1978)
- Three Movements for Clarinet and Percussion (1981)
- Vast (1987)

Chorus

- She Who Hears the Weeping World (2008)
- Ave Maris Stella (1995)
- Beautiful is the East (1998)
- Carla's Poems (1999)
- Flower Drum Song of Feng Yang (arr. 1978)
- Monastery Behind the Mountain (1981)
- Pearl of Asia (1997) Co-Composer: Alice Ho
- Railway Suite (1998)
- Search for Plum Blossoms in Snow (arr. 1986–88)
- To God of All Nations (1976)
- To God of All Nations II (2006) [different music]
- Weaving Maiden, The (2006)

Solo Voice

- As I Rode To Claim My Bride (1970)
- Daughter of Master Chin (1976)
- A Dirge in the Woods (1975)
- Farewell (1970)
- Glimpses of the Moon (1994)
- Lady Magnolia (1982)
- Lullaby (1993)
- Make Way!
- On A Quiet Night (1975)
- Soulmate
- Waiting (1972)
- Yeh-Pan Yüeh (1978)
