= Esprit Orchestra =

Music ensemble in Toronto, Ontario

The Esprit Orchestra is an orchestra based in Toronto, Ontario, Canada that is dedicated to the performance of new orchestral works. It was established in 1983 by music director and conductor Alex Pauk, and is Canada's only full-sized orchestra devoted exclusively to new music. Currently, there are 45 full-time members. A season typically features five concerts featuring 20th and 21st century music as well as newly commissioned works. Notable composers who have written for Esprit include John Burke, Alexina Louie, John Rea, Chan Ka-Nin, Murray Schafer, Owen Underhill, Ryuichi Sakamoto, and John Beckwith.

In the 1990s, the Esprit Orchestra recorded and released renditions of several never previously recorded compositions by Colin McPhee. This resulted in McPhee receiving posthumous Juno Award nominations for Best Classical Composition for "Symphony No. 2" at the Juno Awards of 1998 and "Concerto for Wind Orchestra" at the Juno Awards of 1999.

The orchestra has also participated in film recordings for directors such as Larry Weinstein, Don McKellar, Jeremy Podeswa, Don McBrearty and Deepa Mehta.

In October 2009, Esprit began to perform in the Koerner Hall and has since called it home. Its concerts have also been recorded and broadcast by CBC Radio Two. Three of the orchestra's commercial recordings have been nominated for Juno Awards.
