= Elaine Keillor =

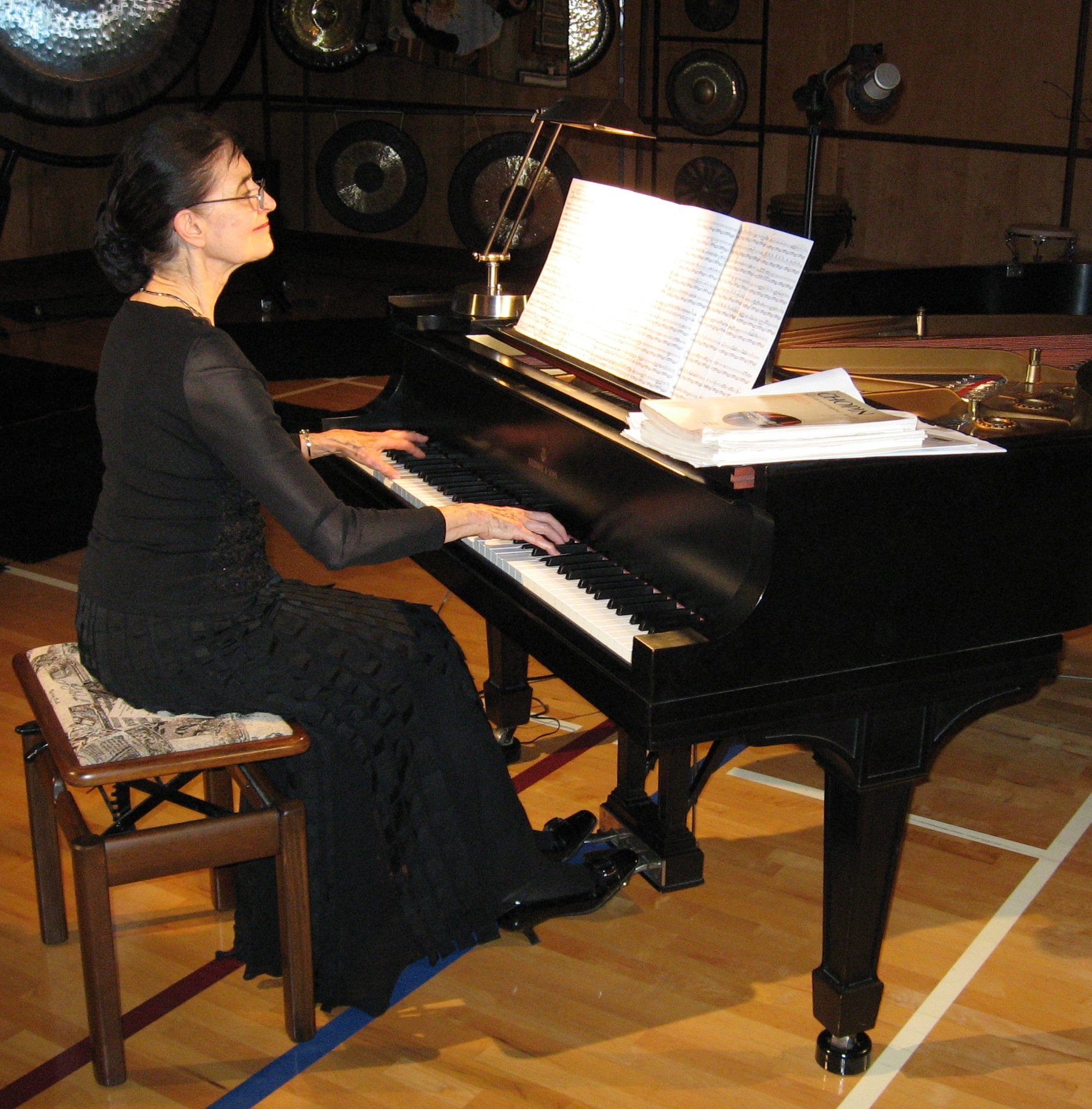

Background information
- Born: Frances Elaine Keillor; 2 September 1939 (age 86); London, Ontario, Canada
- Genres: Classical
- Occupations: Musicologist, instrumentalist
- Instrument: Piano

Frances Elaine Keillor (born 2 September 1939) is a Canadian musicologist and pianist. She has been a professor of music at Carleton University since 1977, specializing in the music of Canadian composers and the music of North American indigenous groups.

== Early life and education ==
Elaine Keillor was born in London, Ontario in 1939. Her first piano teacher was her mother, Lenore Stevens Keillor, although Keillor has said of her mother, "She said that she could not actually recall teaching me to play the piano as I would just go to the instrument and play what she had been teaching the last student."

Elaine also took lessons with Reginald Bedford, and later with Claudio Arrau and Harold Craxton. She progressed rapidly and at age 10 she earned an ARCT certificate from The Royal Conservatory of Music. At the time, she was the youngest person to receive an ARCT, and her record stood for six decades.

Keillor played in recitals, and as soloist with several orchestras in Canada and the United States. She completed her secondary school education through homeschooling, then moved to Europe for further study and performing, including a 1962 performance in the Soviet Union.

While still in her teens, she returned to Canada, and in 1959 embarked on a performing tour of 23 Canadian communities.

A chronic hand injury that began around this time curtailed her performing schedule. Keillor then began studies at the University of Toronto. She earned a B.A. in 1970, an M.A. in musicology the following year, and a Ph.D. in 1976, the first woman to receive a doctorate in musicology from the university.

== Career ==
Following teaching engagements at York University (1975–76) and Queen's University (1976-77), Keillor joined Carleton University in 1977 as the university's first woman professor of music. At Carleton, she has taught courses on the Baroque and Classical periods, Canadian music, ethnomusicology, keyboard performance and keyboard literature. With particular responsibility for Canadian music, she helped launch the university's first courses on Canadian Aboriginal music. In 2005, Carleton named her a Distinguished Research Professor Emerita.

As a performer, Keillor has paid particular attention to work of Canadian composers and women composers. She premiered works by Alexina Louie, John Weinzweig and many others. She has made a number of recordings for Carleton University's record label, Carleton Sound, and Naxos Records.

As a musicologist, Keillor has published extensively, with particular attention to Canadian and First Nations music history. She helped found the Canadian Musical Heritage Society with Helmut Kallmann, Clifford Ford and others, serving as its vice-chair from 1989 to 2000, and chair beginning in 2000.

She has contributed extensively to the Encyclopedia of Music in Canada, part of "The Canadian Encyclopedia", as well as The New Grove Dictionary of Music and Musicians, the Garland Encyclopedia of World Music, and the Continuum Encyclopedia of Popular Music of the World. She was a principal author of the Encyclopedia of Native American Music of North America, released in 2013.

In 2016, Keillor was appointed a member of the Order of Canada, "For her contributions as a musicologist and historian of Canada’s musical heritage."

She was awarded an honorary Doctor of Music from Carleton University in 2016.

== Books ==
- John Weinzweig and his music: the radical romantic of Canada. Metuchen, NJ: Scarecrow Press. 1994. ISBN 9780810828490.
- Music in Canada: capturing landscape and diversity. Montreal: McGill-Queen's University Press. 2006. ISBN 9780773531772.
- With Timothy Archambault and John Medicine Horse Kelly, Encyclopedia of Native American music of North America. Santa Barbara, CA: Greenwood Press. 2013. ISBN 9780313336003.
- As editor: Piano music I (1983), Piano music II (1986), Music for orchestra I (1994), Music for orchestra III (1995). Ottawa: Canadian Musical Heritage Society.

== Selected discography ==
- Piano Music by Torontonians 1834–1984, 1984.
- By a Canadian Lady: Piano Music 1841–1997, Carleton Sound, 2000.
- Canadians at the Keyboard, Carleton Sound, 2000.
- Romance: Early Canadian Chamber Music, Carleton Sound, 2002
- Sounds Of North: Two Centuries Of Canadian Piano, Gala Records, 2012
- When Music Sounds: Canadian Cello Music – Coulthard, Weinzweig, Guerrero, Archer. (With Joan Harrison, cello.) Naxos Records, 2014.
- Poetic Sketches. Centrediscs, 2015.
- Narratives on Life: Music for Cello and Piano – Srul Irving Glick, Steven Gellman, Hélène Riese Liebmann, Maurice Gardner. (With Joan Harrison, cello.) Marquis Classics, 2015.
