= J. Mark Scearce =

American composer (born 1960)

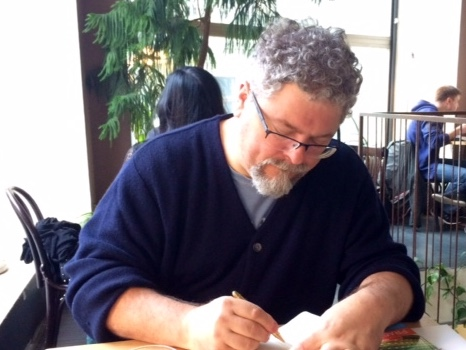
- Born: October 9, 1960 (age 66); Missouri, U.S.
- Occupation: Composer
- Website: jmarkscearce.com at the Wayback Machine (archived 17 January 2020)

J. Mark Scearce (born October 9, 1960) is an American composer known for his musical settings of more than 200 texts by forty poets—from art songs to operas to works for chorus and orchestra.

== Early life ==
J. Mark Scearce was born in Edina, Missouri and grew up in neighboring Kirksville. There he graduated high school in 1979, and attended Northeast Missouri State University (now Truman State), graduating in 1983. At NMSU he triple-majored in music theory, horn performance, and philosophy & religion.

During high school and college, Scearce established himself as a jazz trumpeter, winning outstanding soloist awards at regional jazz festivals (St. Charles, Wichita, Springfield).

Despite acceptance at North Texas to pursue this trajectory, Scearce chose to become a contemporary classical composer after his undergraduate studies, attending Indiana University on the strength of his first composition, a brass quintet written for and recorded by the Chicago Brass Quintet.

Scearce received his Masters and Doctorate in Music Composition from Indiana in 1986 and 1993 respectively.

== Career and influences ==
Scearce’s catalogue of music compositions totals over a thousand performances of sixty works, including seven commercial recordings on the Delos, Warner Bros, Capstone, Centaur, Albany, and Equilibrium labels.

Having formally studied with composers John Eaton, Harvey Sollberger, and Donald Erb—all of whom had deep and lasting influences on his music—Scearce only developed his characteristic tonal style with the work Gaea’s Lament, written in 1989 for cellist and ethnomusicologist Jonathan Kramer, whom Scearce met fresh out of graduate school in North Carolina and whose eclectic holistic teaching highly influenced him.

His associations with other performers and performing organizations shaped many of the forty commissions he received for his music since.

Conductor Al Sturgis has conducted three ballets, two operas, two choral/orchestral works, and six choral works. Conductor John Gordon Ross has conducted thirty-three performances of eight orchestral works.

Endymion’s Sleep, Anima Mundi, and This Thread were borne from Scearce’s association with the Nashville Chamber Orchestra and its Music Director Paul Gambill.

Six works were performed by the North Carolina Symphony (including XL, Urban Primitive, and Antaeus) and twice that by the Carolina Ballet (including The Kreutzer Sonata, Guernica, and Dracula) for a total of 200 performances between these two organizations alone.

In his many vocal settings, Scearce has worked with some of the most renowned poets of his time—Mark Strand, Raymond Carver, A. R. Ammons, and Toni Morrison. His song cycles on Walt Whitman, E. E. Cummings, W. H. Auden, and John Keats are known around the world.

Second to vocal music, his music for ballet has made the greatest impact with audiences, brought about through a close working relationship with choreographer Robert Weiss with whom he has created eight ballets including full-evening productions of Macbeth and Orpheus & Eurydice.

He has written four operas including the full-evening Falling Angel which The Wall Street Journal termed "a noirish thriller skillfully distilled from the original [with] an engaging score borrowing imaginatively from numerous genres".

His String Quartet 1° was premiered by the Ciompi Quartet of Duke and recorded by the Fry Street Quartet. His Str Qt Nr 2 was premiered by the Borromeo Quartet at Bargemusic in Brooklyn for the 125th anniversary of the Brooklyn Bridge. His Third Quartet was premiered by the Penderecki String Quartet on the Open Ear Festival in Toronto.

In writing about Scearce in CVNC, critic John Lambert observed that “his uncanny ability to create melody, to marry melody to words, and to forge combinations of the two to convey emotions or drama or suspense or awe has long set him apart from many of his peers.”

On November 19, 2019, Scearce ceased a forty-year career as a composer with three works unproduced:

- His Missa Memoria oratorio
- His fourth opera FABER
- And his fourth String Quartet

== Teaching positions ==
Scearce served as an arts administrator with the Bowling Green (OH) New Music and Art Festival, the Raleigh (NC) Symphony Development Association, and the Indiana University New Music Ensemble.

He was Composer-in-Residence at North Carolina State University for two years in the early 90s before serving three years on the faculty of the University of Hawaii, where he was founder and director of a contemporary music ensemble and new music festival.

Following three years as Composer-in-Residence as part of the national Meet The Composer New Residencies program, Dr. Scearce taught for a year on the visiting music composition faculty of the University of North Texas before accepting a three-year appointment as Resident Composer in the School of Music at the University of Southern Maine.

Scearce retired after twenty years at NC State in Spring 2024 after a decade running their Music Department and another in their famed College of Design.

== Honors and awards ==
In 2009 he received the International Raymond and Beverly Sackler Prize in Music Composition, the largest single annual award in the field.

In 2010 he was awarded the Raleigh Medal of Arts for lifetime achievement.

He has had residencies at Ucross, MacDowell, and Yaddo artist colonies, as well as Ernest Block, Atlantic Center, June in Buffalo, and Wellesley Composers Conferences early in his career.

He is a Phi Beta Kappa, Pi Kappa Lambda, Phi Alpha Theta, Mu Beta Psi.

== Selected vocal works ==
1992 — Estlin (e.e. cummings)
1993 — Field & Stream (Raymond Carver)
1995 — Bird by Bird (A.R. Ammons)
1997 — American Triptych (Jane Kenyon)
2002 — This Thread (Toni Morrison)
2004 — Str Qt Nr 2 (Hart Crane)
2009 — Bright Star (Keats)
2012 — Missa Memoriae (Catullus)
2013 — Symmetries & Asymmetries (W.H. Auden)
2014 — Falling Angel (Hjorstberg, libretto Lucy Thurber)
2015 — Keeping Things Whole (Mark Strand)
2017 — FABER (Frisch, libretto Scearce)
2019 — Orpheus Alone (String Quartet No 4)* (Mark Strand)
*Last Work
