= John Beckwith (composer) =

Canadian composer (1927–2022)

John Beckwith CM
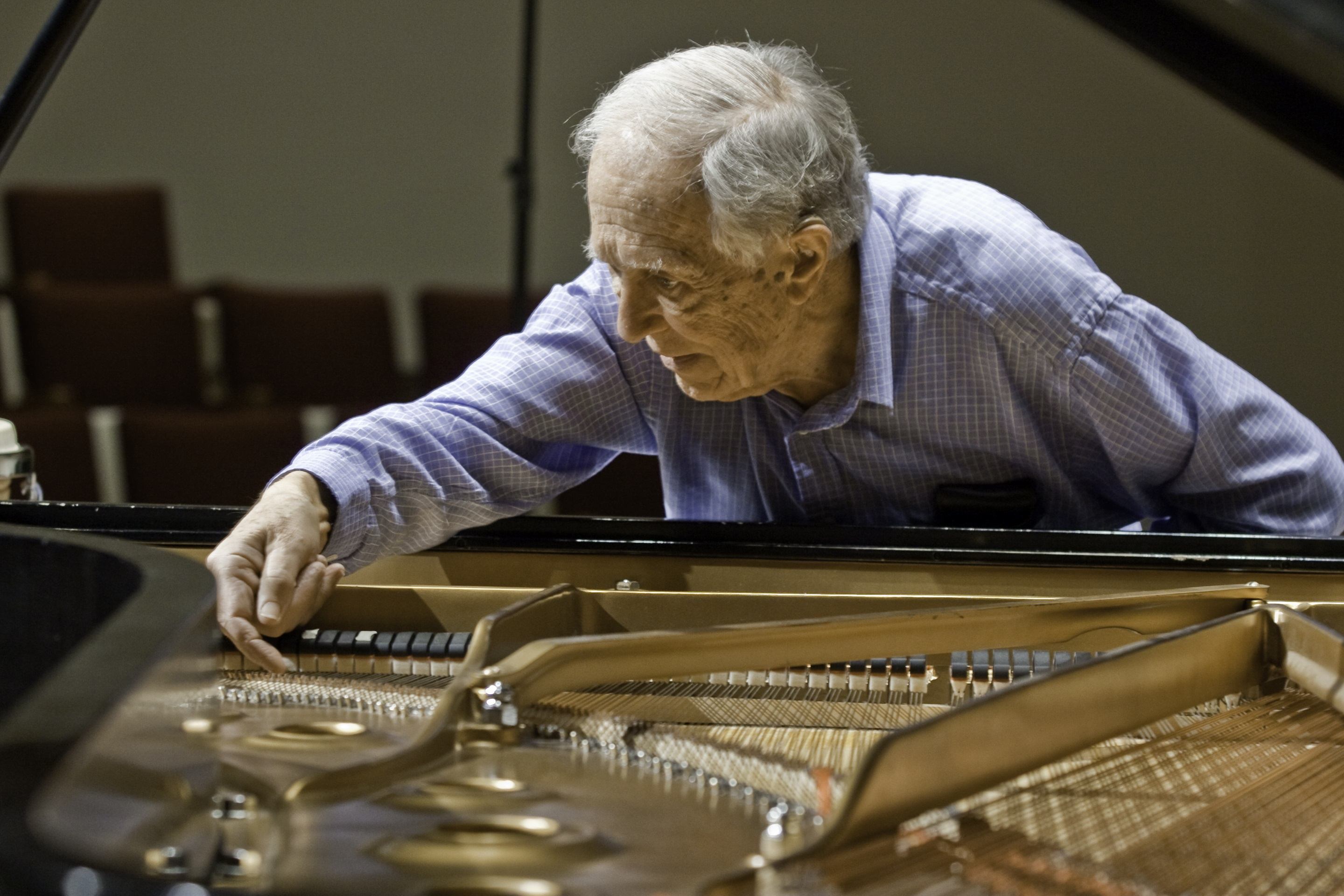
- Beckwith in rehearsal, Walter Hall, Toronto, 2010
- Born: March 9, 1927; Victoria, British Columbia, Canada
- Died: December 5, 2022 (aged 95); Toronto, Ontario, Canada
- Education: The Royal Conservatory of Music; University of Toronto
- Occupations: Composer, writer, pianist, teacher, and administrator

John Beckwith CM (March 9, 1927 – December 5, 2022) was a Canadian composer, writer, pianist, teacher, and administrator.

Born in Victoria, British Columbia, he studied piano with Alberto Guerrero at the Toronto Conservatory of Music in 1945. Beckwith received a Bachelor of Music (Mus.B.) in 1947 and a Master of Music (Mus.M.) in 1961 from the University of Toronto. In 1950-51, he studied with Nadia Boulanger in Paris. He began teaching at University of Toronto's Faculty of Music in 1952. From 1970 to 1977, he was the dean of the faculty. He was founding director of the Institute for Canadian Music at the University of Toronto. In 1987, he was made a member of the Order of Canada. He retired from the university in 1990.

Beckwith wrote over 160 compositions covering stage, orchestral, chamber, solo and choral genres. He also wrote 17 books, the last of which - Music Annals: Research and Critical Writings by a Canadian Composer - was published shortly before his death in 2022.

== Education ==
In 1945, after several years of studying piano at the Royal Conservatory of Music, Beckwith received a Conservatory scholarship that allowed him to study piano with Alberto Guerrero at the University of Toronto where he obtained his Mus.B. His other teachers included Leo Smith and John Weinzweig. In 1950 he was awarded a second scholarship, this time from the Canadian Amateur Hockey Association. The scholarship allowed him to travel to Paris, where he studied composition under Nadia Boulanger. Under Weinzweig's supervision, Beckwith earned his Mus.M. from the University of Toronto in 1961.

== Career ==
After studying in Paris, Beckwith returned to Toronto to pursue further studies and became active as a performing musician, actor, critic, radio commentator, writer, lecturer and broadcaster. In 1952, he returned to the University of Toronto, but this time as a part-time lecturer at the Faculty of Music. He was appointed full-time lecturer in 1955. He remained in this position for several years, and eventually became dean of the faculty from 1970 to 1977. Beckwith was the first Jean A. Chalmers Professor of Canadian Music and the first director of the Institute for Canadian Music at the University of Toronto. He retired in 1990 to devote more time to composing. Among his notable pupils were Brian Cherney, Gustav Ciamaga, Omar Daniel, John Fodi, Clifford Ford, Ben McPeek, James Rolfe, Clark Ross, Matthew Davidson, and Timothy Sullivan.

While teaching, Beckwith remained active in several areas of the musical community. A co-founder of the Canadian Music Centre in 1959, he wrote for the Toronto Star from 1959 to 1965 as an arts critic and columnist, and was a writer and associate producer of documentaries and music series for CBC Radio. Beginning in 1981, he worked as a director for the Canadian Musical Heritage Society, which he had co-founded that same year. He prepared two of the society's 25-volume series of pre-1950 Canadian-composed music. In 1986, a five-record set of his music was included in the Anthology of Canadian Music series. The Beckwith portrait in the Canadian Composers Portraits series was released in 2003.

A collection of 25 of his music articles and talks was published by Golden Dog Press in 1997 under the title Music Papers. In 2006, his biography In Search of Alberto Guerrero was published by Wilfrid Laurier Press (issued in Spanish translation in 2021). With Brian Cherney, he edited Weinzweig: Essays on His Life and Music in 2011 and, with Robin Elliott, he edited Mapping Canada's Music: Selected Writings of Helmut Kallmann in 2013.

Beckwith's autobiography, Unheard Of: Memoirs of a Canadian Composer, was published by Wilfrid Laurier Press in 2012.

He was the recipient of many honours including from the Canadian Music Council in 1972 and 1984, Toronto Arts award in 1995, Diplôme d'honneur from the Canadian Conference of the Arts in 1996, honorary membership in the Canadian University Music Society in 1999, and honorary doctorates from McGill, Mount Allison, Queen's, Victoria, and Guelph universities. Taking a Stand: Essays in Honour of John Beckwith, a festschrift on the occasion of his retirement, was published in 1995.

== Compositional style ==
Beckwith composed over 160 large works. While the majority of his works are settings of Canadian texts for voice, he also wrote for orchestral and chamber groups as well as solo instrumental pieces and choral music. His musical output expressed his interest in Canadian culture.

Beckwith was a modernist whose eclectic compositional vocabulary was sustained "by a broad palette of idioms, colours, and by the availability of a rich variety of forming procedures." Most of his compositions have themes that connect to historical or regional Canada. Beckwith was deeply interested in Canadian folk song and set around 200 of these songs, including Four Love Songs (1969) and Five Songs (1969–70). Most of the arrangements were written in 1981-91 during his involvement with Music at Sharon, a summer concert series. He often collaborated with Canadian writers when setting text for voice including James Reaney, Jay Macpherson, Margaret Atwood, bpNichol, Georges Sioui, and Dennis Lee; his most extensive collaboration was with Reaney, with whom he wrote a number of works for the stage, including four operas. Beckwith also set texts of e.e. cummings, John Millington Synge, Samuel Beckett, and poems of the Tang dynasty translated by Witter Bynner.

== List of works ==
Based on the Encyclopedia of Music in Canada (2nd edition, 1992) and the John Beckwith website, University of Toronto. Unpublished works are at the Canadian Music Centre and the Beckwith fonds, University of Toronto.

=== Stage ===
- Night Blooming Cereus (Reaney). 1953-58 (1959 Toronto). 8 singers, 14 instruments. Ms
- The Killdeer, incidental music (Reaney). 1960, rescored 1961. Prepared piano (5 instruments). Ms
- The Hector, documentary cantata (various). 1990 (1990 Toronto). Soprano, early-instrument ensemble. Ms
- The Shivaree (Reaney). 1964-65, 1977-78. Revisions with prologue added, 1982. (1982 Toronto; 1982 Banff (revised version with prologue)). 12 singers, 20 instr. Ms
- Crazy to Kill (Reaney, after Ann Caldwell). 1987-88 ( 1989 Guelph). 3 singers, 2 speakers, 2 instruments, tape. Ms
- Lucas et Cécile. 1808-09 (1990 Sharon). Concert arrangement of a comic opera by Joseph Quesnel with orchestration by Beckwith. Soli, orchestra. Ms
- Taptoo! (Reaney). 1993-95 (Montreal, 1999). 18 singers, 18 instruments. Ms

=== Orchestra and band ===
- Music for Dancing (orchestra from piano, 4 hands). 1948 (piano), orch 1959 (1959 Ottawa). BMI Canada 1961.
- Montage. 1953, rescored 1955 (1953 Toronto). Orchestra. Ms
- Fall Scene and Fair Dance. 1956 (1956 Toronto). Violin, clarinet, strings. BMI Canada 1957. 1977. Lethbridge Symphony Assn
- Concerto Fantasy. 1959 (1962 Montreal). Piano, orchestra. Berandol
- Flower Variations and Wheels. 1962 (1963 Victoria). Rev. 1979. Orchestra. Berandol
- Concertino. 1963 (1964 Toronto). Horn, orchestra. Berandol
- Jonah, cantata (various). 1963 (1963 Toronto). BMI Canada 1969
- Place of Meeting (Dennis Lee). 1967 (1967 Toronto ). Speaker, tenor, blues singer, SATB, orchestra. Ms
- Elastic Band Studies. 1969, rev. 1975 (1976 Toronto). Concert band. Ms
- Beckwith, John; Reaney, James (1973). All the Bees and All the Keys. Press Porcépic. (1973 Toronto). Narrator, orchestra. Orchestra Berandol, piano arrangement.
- A Concert of Myths. 1983 (1984 Calgary). Flute, orchestra. Ms
- Peregrine. 1989 (1990 Toronto). Viola, percussion, small orchestra. Ms
- Round and Round. 1991-92 (1992 Winnipeg). Orchestra. Ms
- Fifteen Figural Chorales from J.S. Bach's Das Orgelbüchlein (transcription), 1991 (1993 Halifax). Orchestra. Ms
- Fourteen Figural Chorales from J.S. Bach's Das Orgelbüchlein (transcription), 1993 (1996 Halifax). Orchestra. Ms
- Sixteen Figural Chorales from J.S. Bach's Das Orgelbüchlein (transcription), 1997. Orchestra. Ms
- Madness. 2003 (2003, Toronto) 2 oboes, bassoon, strings. Ms
- Three Brass Rings. 2007 (1984, Toronto; 2009 Toronto all) 11 brasses. Ms
- Variations. 2011 (2012, Ottawa). String orchestra. Ms

=== Chamber ===
- The Great Lakes Suite (Reaney). 1949 (1950 Toronto). Soprano, baritone, clarinet, cello, piano.
- Five Pieces for Flute Duet. 1951 (1951 Paris). BMI Canada 1962
- Four Pieces for Bassoon Duet. 1951. Ms
- Quartet for Woodwind Instruments. 1951 ( 1953 Toronto). Ms
- Three Studies for String Trio. 1956 (1957 Toronto). Ms
- Circle, with Tangents. 1967 (1967 Vancouver). Harpsichord, 13 solo strings. BMI Canada 1968
- Taking a Stand. 1972 (1972 Stratford). 5 players, 8 brass instruments, 14 music stands. Berandol 1975
- Musical Chairs. 1973 (1974 Toronto). String quintet, contrabassoon. Berandol 1980
- Quartet. 1977 (1978 Montreal). String quartet. Ms.
- Case Study: a multi-purpose quintet. 1980 (1980 Toronto). Any 5 instruments. Ms
- Eight Miniatures: arranged from the Alan Ash manuscript. 1981. Violin, piano. Ms
- Sonatina in Two Movements. 1981 (1982 Toronto). Trumpet, piano. Ms
- Tunes of the Sharon Band (arrangement). 1982 (1982 Sharon). Brass quintet. Sonante 1984
- Arctic Dances. 1984 (1984 Kingston). Oboe, piano. Ms.
- For Starters G.E.C. [George Edward Connell].1984 (Toronto 1984). 11 brass instr. Ms
- College Airs. 1990 (1990 Toronto). String quartet. Ms
- Echoes of Quesnel. 1995 (1997 Toronto). Violin, viola, cor anglais, organ. Ms
- Echoes of Thiele. 1995 (1996 Kitchener). Chamber orchestra (oboe, 2 trumpets, trombone, percussion, viola, cello, contrabass). Ms
- Eureka. 1996 (1996 Toronto). 9 wind instruments. Ms
- Lines Overlapping. 1996-97 (Toronto). Banjo, harpsichord. Ms
- Blurred Lines (duo in quartertones). 1997 (1997 Toronto). Violin, harpsichord. Ms
- Ringaround. 1998 (1999 Toronto). Celtic harp, harpsichord. Ms
- A Game of Bowls. 1999 (2000 Toronto). 3 percussion. Ms
- Workout. 2001 (2001 Toronto). 4 percussion. Ms
- A New Pibroch. 2002 (2003 Toronto). Highland pipes, percussion, 7 strings. Ms
- Back to Bolivia. 2006 (2010 Toronto). Clarinet quartet. Ms
- Fractions. 2006 (2007 Toronto). 16th-tone piano, string quartet. Ms
- Animals with Horns. 2007 (2010 Toronto). Trumpet, euphonium. Ms
- Play and Sing. 2008. cello, soprano (1 performer). Ms
- After Simpson. 2010 (2013 Toronto). 2 recorders, 2 viola da gamba. Ms
- Breaking Silence. 2013 (2013 St. John's). Cello. Ms
- Sonatina on "Mairi's Wedding." 2013 (2013 Toronto). Flute, piano. Ms
- Follow me. 2013. Clarinet, piano. Ms.
- Ut re me fa sol la. 2013. Guitar. Ms
- Quintet. 2015 (2017 Toronto). Flute, trumpet, bassoon, viola, double bass. Ms
- Calling. 2016 (2017 Toronto). Flugelhorn, euphonium, 2 tenor trombones, bass trombone, double bass. Ms.
- Meanwhile. 2018 (2018 Ottawa). Marimba, piano. Ms.

=== Keyboard(s) ===
- Four Conceits. 1945, rev. 1948. Piano. Ms.
- Music for Dancing. 1948 (1948 Toronto). Piano, 4 hands. Ms.
- The Music Room. 1951. Piano. Frederick Harris 1955.
- Novelette. 1951 (1951 Paris). Piano. BMI Canada 1954.
- Six Mobiles. 1959. Piano. BMI Canada 1960.
- Interval Studies. 1962. Piano. BMI Canada 1962
- Suite on Old Tunes (arrangement). 1967. Piano. BMI Canada 1967.
- Variation piquant sur la `Toronto Opera House Waltz.' 1967. 2 piano. Ms
- New Mobiles. 1971. Piano. Waterloo 1972
- Upper Canadian Hymn Preludes. 1976-77 (1977 Ottawa). Organ, prepared tape. Ms.
- Keyboard Practice. 1979 (1979 Toronto). 4 players, 10 keyboard. (1986).
- Etudes. 1983 (1984 Vancouver). Piano. Ms. Counterpoint.
- On the Other Hand. 1997 (1997 Toronto). Harpsichord. Ms
- March, March! 2001 (2001 Montreal). Piano. Ms
- The Cheese Stands Still. 2004. Piano. Ms
- Light Work. 2007 (2009 Montreal). 16th-tone piano, 4 hands. Ms
- Yesteryear. 2010 (2013 St John's). Piano, 4 hands. Ms
- Pages. 2016 (2016 Halifax). Piano. Ms

=== Choir ===
- The Trumpets of Summer (Atwood). 1964. Soloists, SATB, narrator, chamber ensemble Berandol.
- Sharon Fragments (Willson). 1966. SATB. Waterloo 1966.
- The Sun Dance (various). 1968. SATB, speaker, organ, percussion. Independently published. 1968
- Three Blessings (Fisher, Burns, Wesley). 1968. SATB, instruments (optional in No. 2).
- Gas! (Beckwith). 1969. 20 speaking voices. Berandol 1978
- 1838 (Lee). 1970. SATB. Novello 1970
- Papineau (2 Lower Canada folk songs). 1977. 2 equal voices. Gordon V. Thompson 1978.
- Three Motets on Swan's 'China' (various).'1981. SATB. Waterloo1983.
- A Little Organ Concert (vocables). 1982. SATB, organ, brass quintet. Ms
- A Canadian Christmas Carol (J. P. Clarke)(arrangement). 1984. SATB, harmonium (piano or organ). Gordon V. Thompson 1989.
- Mating Time (bp Nichol). 1982. SATB (20 solo voices), percussion, electric keyboard. Ms
- Harp of David (Book of Common Prayer). 1985. SATB. Ms.
- The Banks of Newfoundland (arrangement).1985. Baritone, SATB (oboe, string quartet) Gordon V. Thompson 1987
- Three Burns Songs (R. Burns) (arrangement).1986. SATB. Gordon V. Thompson 1987
- Farewell To Nova Scotia (arrangement).1985. Baritone, SATB, piano, percussion 2 trumpet, viola, cello, double bass. Gordon V. Thompson 1987
- The Gowans Are Gay (arrangement). 1986. SATB, percussion. Gordon V. Thompson 1987 69
- Basic Music. 1998. Children's Choir (SA), Youth Choir (SSA) and orchestra. Ms
- Lady Music. 2000. SATB
- Snow is Falling. 2002. Children's choir, flute, guitar.
- Alternative Greeting (Happy Birthday). 2003. Flute, clarinet, percussion, piano, voices.
- Derailed: A Sound Documentary. 2007 (2007 Mississauga). Double choir (SSAATTBB), percussion. Ms
- Wendake/Huronia, 2015. Alto, narrator, chamber choir, instruments, drums. Ms

=== Voice ===
- Five Lyrics of the T'ang Dynasty (various). 1947 (1948 Toronto). High voice, piano.
- Serenade (Thibaudeau). 1949. Med voice, piano. Ms. RCI 36 (C. Jordan)
- The Formal Garden of the Heart (Thibaudeau). 1950. Med voice, piano. Ms
- Four Songs to Poems by e.e. cummings. 1950 (1950 Toronto). Soprano, piano. Waterloo 1975
- Four Songs from Ben Jonson's Volpone. 1961. Baritone, guitar. BMI Canada 1967
- A Chaucer Suite. 1962 (1963 Montreal). Alto, tenor, baritone. Ms
- Ten English Rhymes (anonymous). 1963 (1963 Montreal). Young voices, piano. BMI Canada 1964
- Four Love Songs (Canadian folk songs). 1969. Baritone, piano. Berandol 1970.
- Five Songs (arrangement). 1970. Alto, piano. Waterloo 1970
- Six Songs to Poems by e.e. cummings. 1980–1982 (1983 Toronto). Baritone, piano. Ms
- Earlier Voices (arrangement). 1984. Soprano, baritone, SATB, piano. Ms
- Avowals (bpNichol). 1985 (1985 Toronto). Tenor, 1 keyboard player on piano, celesta, harpsichord. Ms
- Les Premiers hivernements (S. Champlain, M. Lescarbot). 1986 (1986 Toronto). Soprano, tenor, 2 recorder, lute, viol, percussion. Ms
- Synthetic Trios (vocables). 1987 (1989 Quebec City). Soprano, clarinet, piano. Ms
- The Harp that Once thro' Tara's Halls (T. Moore) (arrangement). 1986. Mezzo soprano, piano. Gordon V. Thompson 1987
- beep (bpNichol). 1990 (1990 Elora). Soprano, baritone, SATB, percussion. Ms
- Stacey (Margaret Laurence), 1997 (1998 Toronto). Soprano, piano. Ms
- A Man and His Flute (Miriam Waddington), 2000; 2003 (two poems added) (Toronto 2003). Soprano, piano. Ms
- Merton Duets. 2005 (2006 Toronto). Soprano, mezzo soprano, violin. Ms
- Beckett Songs. 2008 (2008 Sackville). Baritone, guitar. Ms
- Singing Synge. 2011 (2012 Toronto). Baritone, piano. Ms
- Tanu. 2013 (2014 Montreal). Soprano, flute, cello. Ms
- Four Short Songs. 2016 (2016 London). Medium voice, piano. Ms

=== Collage ===
- A Message to Winnipeg (Reaney). 1960 (1960 Toronto). 4 speakers, violin, clarinet, piano, percussion. Ms
- Twelve Letters to a Small Town (Reaney). 1961 (1961 Toronto). 4 speakers, flute, oboe, guitar, piano-harmonium. Ms
- Wednesday's Child (Reaney). 1962 (1962 Toronto). 3 speakers, soprano, tenor, flute, viola, piano, percussion. Ms
- Canada Dash – Canada Dot (Reaney). 1965-67 (1965-67 Toronto). In 3 parts. Voices, speakers, Chamber ensemble. Ms
- The Journals of Susanna Moodie, incidental (Atwood). 1972, revised 1990 (1973 Toronto). 2 keyboard players, percussion. Ms
- "In the middle of ordinary noise...": An Auditory Masque (Reaney). 1992 (1992 Toronto). Speaker, 2 soli, 3 instruments, tape. Ms

== Selected writings ==
- "Composers in Toronto and Montreal". University of Toronto Quarterly. 26. October 1956.
- "Music". The Culture of Contemporary Canada. Cornell University Press. 1957. pp. 143–162.
- "Music". The Arts in Canada. Macmillan. 1958. pp. 44–51.
- "Young Composers' Performances in Toronto". Canadian Music Journal. 2. Summer 1958.
- "Jean Papineau-Couture". Canadian Music Journal. 3. Winter 1959.
- "Recent Orchestral Works by Champagne, Morel and Anhalt". Canadian Music Journal. 4. Summer 1960.
- The Modern Composer and His World: A Report from the International Conference of Composers. University of Toronto Press. 1961. Co-edited with Udo Kasemets
- "Notes on a Recording Career (The Work of Glenn Gould)". Canadian Forum. 40. January 1961. Reprinted in: Music Papers: Articles and Talks by a Composer.
- "Review of A History of Music in Canada 1534–1914 by Helmut Kallmann,". University of Toronto Quarterly. 30. July 1961.
- "Schoenberg Ten Years After". Canadian Forum. 41. November 1961.
- "Stravinsky Triptych". Canadian Music Journal. 6. Summer 1962.
- "Music Education". Encyclopedia Canadiana. Vol. 7. Grolier. 1963. pp. 229–31.
- "Musical Instruments". Encyclopedia Canadiana. Vol. 7. Grolier. 1963. pp. 213–17. Co-authored with Helmut Kallmann.
- "The Bernstein Experiment". Canadian Forum. 43. April 1964.
- "Notes on Jonah". Alphabet. June 8, 1964.
- "Review of British Composers in Interview, edited by R. Murray Schafer". University of Toronto Quarterly. 33. July 1964.
- "A "Complete" Schoenberg". Canadian Forum. 46. January 1967.
- "About Canadian Music: The P.R. failure". Musicanada (21). July–August 1969. reprinted with postscript, AGO/RCCO Music, vol. 5, March 1971. Reprinted in: Music Papers: Articles and Talks by a Composer.
- "What Every U.S. Musician Should Know About Contemporary Canadian Music". Musicanada (29). 1970.
- "Music in Canada". Musical Times. 111. December 1970.
- "Trying to Define Music". Conservatory Bulletin. Christmas 1970. Reprinted in: Music Papers: Articles and Talks by a Composer.
- "Aims and Methods for a Music-Theory Program". Canadian Association of University Schools of Music Journal. 1. Spring 1971.
- "Healey Willan". Canadian Forum. 52. December 1972. Reprinted in: Music Papers: Articles and Talks by a Composer.
- "Teaching New Music: What? How? Why?". Music Scene (270). March–April 1973.
- "Canada". Dictionary of Contemporary Music. New York, NY: Dutton. 1974. pp. 119–124.
- "Harry Somers". Dictionary of Contemporary Music. Dutton. 1974. pp. 689–90.
- Contemporary Canadian Composers. Oxford University Press. 1975. Co-edited with Keith MacMillan.
- "István Anhalt". Music Scene (281). January–February 1975.
- "Satisfaction Mingles with Frustration in the Composer's Life". The Arts in Canada, Today and Tomorrow. Yorkminster. 1976. pp. 148–52.
- "A Big Song-and-Dance". Canadian Music Educator. 18. Spring 1977. Reprinted in: Music Papers: Articles and Talks by a Composer.
- "Reflections on Charles Ives |Ives". An Ives Celebration. University of Illinois Press. 1977. pp. 230–32.
- "A Festival of Canadian Music". Musicanada: A Presentation of Canadian Contemporary Music. Ottawa. 1977. Reprinted in: Music Papers: Articles and Talks by a Composer.
- Music In Canada. Ottawa. 1979.
- Canadian Music in the 1960s and 1970s: A Chronicle. Toronto. 1979. Co-edited with Ruth Pincoe. Reprinted in: Music Papers: Articles and Talks by a Composer.
- "Kolinski: An Appreciation and List of Works". Cross-Cultural Perspectives on Music. University of Toronto Press. 1982. pp. xvii–xxiv.
- John Weinzweig at Seventy. Toronto: New Music Concerts. 1983. Editor. Reprinted in: Music Papers: Articles and Talks by a Composer.
- "Shattering a Few Myths". Glenn Gould: By Himself and His Friends. Gage Publishing. 1983. pp. 63–74. Reprinted in: Music Papers: Articles and Talks by a Composer.
- "Choral Confessions". Anacrusis. 6. Fall 1986.
- "On Compiling an Anthology of Canadian Hymn Tunes". Sing Out the Glad News: Hymn Tunes in Canada: Proceedings of the Conference (University of Toronto, 1986). CanMus Documents. Vol. 1. Toronto: Institute for Canadian Music. 1987. pp. 3–32. Also the editor.
- "Canadian Tunebooks and Hymnals, 1801–1939". American Music. 6. Summer 1988.
- "'A "Failure" Revisited: New Canadian Music in Recent Studies and Reference Works". Hello Out There! Canada's New Music in the World, 1950-85. CanMus Documents. Vol. 2. Institute for Canadian Music. 1988. pp. 114–125. Also co-edited with Dorith Cooper. Reprinted in: Music Papers: Articles and Talks by a Composer.
- Musical Canada: Words and Music Honouring Helmut Kallmann. University of Toronto Press. 1988. Co-edited with Frederick A. Hall.
- "From Composer to Audience: The Production of "Serious" Music in Canada [colloquy]" (PDF). Canadian University Music Review. 9 (2): 117–137. 1989. Co-authored with Regula Burckhardt Qureshi, Alan Lessem, Alfred Fisher, and Barry Truax.
- "The New Grove Dictionary of American Music, America's Music, and Music in the United States: A Historical Introduction [review essay]" (PDF). Canadian University Music Review. 9 (2): 138–146. 1989.
- "Canadiana Realizations for "Music at Sharon," 1981–90". News from the Canadian Musical Heritage Society. 1. Spring 1991.
- "Letter from Canada". Sonneck Society Bulletin. 17 (2). 1991.
- Music at Toronto: A Personal Account. Institute for Canadian Music [distributor]. 1995.
- Music Papers: Articles and Talks by a Canadian Composer. Golden Dog Press. 1997.
- "Ernest MacMillan and England" (PDF). Canadian University Music Review. 19 (1). 1998.
- "Colloquy: Violet Archer, Jean Coulthard, and Barbara Pentland Remembered" (PDF). Canadian University Music Review. 20 (2): 13–15. 2000.
- Psalmody in British North America: Humbert, Daulé, Jenkins, Burnham. Institute for Canadian Music. 2002.
- "Thomas-Étienne Hamel and his Annales musicales du Petit-Cap: A Manuscript Song Collection of Nineteenth-Century Quebec". Musicultures: Journal of the Canadian Society for Traditional Music. 29. 2002.
- "The Oxford History of Music: A Canadian Reflection [review essay]". CAML Review. 33 (3): 27–36. 2005.
- "The Present State of Unpopular Music" (PDF). Intersections: Canadian Journal of Music. 35 (2): 8–18. 2007.
- In Search of Alberto Guerrero. Wilfrid Laurier University Press. 2011.
- Weinzweig: Essays on His Life and Music. Wilfrid Laurier University Press. 2011. Co-edited with Brian Cherney.
- Unheard Of: Memoirs of a Canadian Composer. Wilfrid Laurier University Press. 2012.
- Mapping Canada's Music: Selected Writings of Helmut Kallmann. Wilfrid Laurier University Press. 2013. Co-edited with Robin Elliott.
- Music Annals: Research and Critical Writings by a Canadian Composer 1973-2014. Institute for Canadian Music. 2022.

== Bibliography ==
- Clark, Katy Aileen (2022). Regionalism in the Operas of John Beckwith and James Reaney (DMA diss.). University of Toronto.
- MacMillan, Keith (1995). "Beckwith, John". In Sadie, Stanley (ed.). The New Grove Dictionary of Music and Musicians. Vol. 2. Macmillan. pp. 342–43.
- McGee, Timothy J., ed. (1995). Taking a Stand: Essays in Honour of John Beckwith. University of Toronto Press.
- Proctor, George A. (1980). Canadian Music of the Twentieth Century. University of Toronto Press.
- Such, Peter (1972). "John Beckwith". Soundprints: Contemporary Composers. Clarke, Irwin. pp. 54–77.
- Steenhuisen, Paul (2009). "John Beckwith". Sonic Mosaics: Conversations with Composers. University of Alberta Press. ISBN 978-0-88864-474-9.
- Vinton, Jon (1974). "Beckwith, John". Dictionary of Contemporary Music. pp. 63–64.
- Wolters, Benita (1999). The Early Years of the Canadian League of Composers (M.A., Music). University of British Columbia.
