= Clifford Ford =

Canadian composer, editor, music educator and author

Clifford Robert Ford (born 30 May 1947) is a Canadian composer, editor, music educator, and author. An associate of the Canadian Music Centre, he is a founding member of ARRAYMUSIC and a former member of the music faculties of McMaster University and Dalhousie University. He co-founded the Canadian Musical Heritage Society for which he is executive secretary and technical editor.

== Education ==
Born in Toronto, Ford studied piano, organ, and voice privately in his native city with Eric Lewis from 1957 to 1962. In 1960 he entered The Royal Conservatory of Music where he studied music theory and music composition with John Beckwith through 1964. He later pursued further studies with Beckwith and John Weinzweig at the University of Toronto where he earned a Bachelor of Music in 1970. That same year he won the Composers, Authors and Publishers Association of Canada's Ernest MacMillan Award which provided him with funds to pursue studies with István Anhalt at McGill University in 1970–1971. He later returned to that school for graduate studies in composition, earning a Master of Music in 1981. He also spent a year studying at the Institute for Sonology at Utrecht University with Gottfried Michael Koenig in 1973.

== Career ==
Ford joined the faculty of McMaster University in 1974 and taught there until 1976. He then taught at Dalhousie University until 1980. In 1981 he co-founded the Canadian Musical Heritage Society, and served as its executive secretary and technical editor.

In the 1980s Ford published several works about music in Canada, and later contributed articles to music publications, including several entries in The Canadian Encyclopedia.

Since 1989 he has worked as a consultant on electronic publishing.

== Selected compositions ==
- Mass 1976
- "Little Fantasy"
- "Forbidden Colours"

== Selected publications ==
- Canada's music: an historical survey, 1982.
- Sacred choral music - Volume 1, Canadian Musical Heritage Society, 1984.
- Sacred choral music - Volume I1, Canadian Musical Heritage Society, 1988.
- Variations on Alexander Davidson's "Toronto": for solo organ, 1993
