= Joseph Petric discography =

Concert accordionist and pedagogue Joseph Petric's discography includes 59 titles on Naxos, Chandos Records, Musica Viva, CBC5000 Series, Analekta, Astrila, Centrediscs (recording label of the Canadian Music Centre), and ConAccord labels. Many of Petric's albums are thematic; Euphonia (2002) features works by female composers Linda Catlin Smith, Jocelyn Morlock, and Janika Vandervelde, and Elektrologos (2010) consists only of electroacoustic works by Christos Hatzis, Bob Pritchard and Larry Lake. Similarly, Dialogues and Illuminations: Jean-Philippe Rameau 1683–1764 (2002),18 Sonatas by Domenico Scarlatti (2008), Petric – Forget Duo: J. S. Bach Complete Trio Sonatas (2009), and Heretic Threads: Works by Joseph Haydn (2023) feature adaptations of early music. The period-recording Victorian Romance (2009) includes works by Bernhard Molique and George Alexander McFarren performed by Streicher fortepianist Boyd McDonald. The select discography below includes 34 of Petric's audio recordings.

Concert documentaries and video recordings of Petric are available from EUTV5, CBC, and Array Music. Some of Petric's radio and television broadcasts are also available through Canada's CBC and Société Radio Canada archives.

JOSEPH PETRIC, SELECT DISCOGRAPHY
Year Issued	Album name	Track & Composition Details	Performers	Record label	Year Recorded
2023	Heretic Threads: Works by Joseph Haydn	Sonata in F Major, Hob. XVI23 - Fortepiano (Joseph Haydn, 1773): 1. "I. Allegro moderato"; 2. "II. Larghetto"; 3. "III. Presto"; Sonata in E Minor, Hob. XVI34 - Fortepiano (Joseph Haydn, 1783): 4. "I. Presto"; 5. "II. Adagio"; 6. "III. Finale, Molto vivace"; Fantasia in C Major, Hob.XVI4 -Fortepiano (Joseph Haydn, 1789): 7. "Fantasia in C Major - Presto"; Sonata in F Major, Hob. XVI23 - Accordion (Joseph Haydn, 1773): 8. "I. Allegro moderato"; 9. "II. Larghetto"; 10. "III. Presto"; Sonata in E Minor, Hob. XVI34 - Accordion (Joseph Haydn, 1783): 11. "I. Presto"; 12. "II. Adagio"; 13. "III. Finale, Molto vivace"; Fantasia in C Major, Hob.XVI4 - Accordion (Joseph Haydn, 1789): 14. "Fantasia in C Major - Presto"; Sintering (Joseph Haydn, Joseph Petric, Boyd McDonald & Peter Lutek; n.d.): 15. "Sintering"	Joseph Petric (accordion), Boyd McDonald (fortepiano), Peter Lutek (electronics)	Astrila	2021
2022	Docu-Fictions	2. "Lily [Mixed Version]" (Yves Daoust, 2014–18)	Joseph Petric (accordion), Lynn Kuo (violin), fixed medium electronics	empreintes DIGITALes	2021
2022	SEEN	Spirit Cloud (David Jaeger & Joseph Petric, n.d.): 1. "Spirit Cloud"; Seen (Norbert Palej, 2019): 2. "I. Vision of St. Margaret Mary Alacoque"; 3. "II. Mary's Hill"; 4. "III. Miracle of the Sun"; Fadensonnen (Robert May, 1994): 5. "Fadensonnen"; Pneuma (Peter Hatch, 1986): 6. "Pneuma"; Leviathan (Erik Ross, 2008): 7. "Leviathan"; Metamorphoses (Torbjorn Lundquist, 1964): 8. "Metamorphoses"	Joseph Petric (accordion), electronics	Redshift	2021
2021	Frank Horvat: Music for Self-Isolation	25. "Music for Self-Isolation: Accordion (Frank Horvat, 2020)	Joseph Petric (accordion)	Centrediscs (CMC)	2020
2010	Elektrologos: New Electroacoustic Works for Accordion	1. "Breathe on Me (O Breath of God…)" (Bob Pritchard, n.d.); 2. "Fractals" (Larry Lake, n.d.); 3. "Sticherarion" (Larry Lake, 1984); 4. "Orbiting Garden" (Christos Hatzis, 1989; arr. 1991)	Joseph Petric (accordion), electronics	ConAccord	2009
2009	18 Sonatas by Domenico Scarlatti	1. "Sonata in C Major, K. 84" (Scarlatti for all tracks); 2. "Sonata in F Major, K. 418"; 3. "Sonata in D Major, K. 9"; 4. "Sonata in F Major, K. 17"; 5. "Sonata in G Major, K. 337"; 6. "Sonata in C Major, K. 159"; 7. "Sonata in Bb Major, K. 334"; 8. "Sonata in A Major, K. 208"; 9. "Sonata in A Major, K. 321"; 10. "Sonata in D Major, K. 21"; 11. "Sonata in G Major, K. 2"; 12. "Sonata in Bb Major, K. 529"; 13. "Sonata in D Minor, K. 459"; 14. "Sonata in C Minor, K. 363"; 15. "Sonata in C Minor, K. 387"; 16. "Sonata in A Major, K. 209"; 17. "Sonata in E Major, K.46"; 18. "Sonata in A Minor, K. 54"	Joseph Petric (accordion)	Astrila	2008
2008	Schubert: Winterreise (Arr. For Chamber Ensemble)	Die Winterreise, D. 911 (Franz Schubert, 1827; arr. Normand Forget): 1–24. [complete song cycle]	Christoph Pregardien (tenor), Joseph Petric (accordion), Pentaedre Wind Quintet	ATMA	2007
2010	A Victorian Romance	Flying Leaves, Op. 50 (Bernhard Molique, 1856): 1. "I. Allegro Appassionato"; 2. "II. Andante con moto"; 3. "III. Allegretto"; 4. "IV. Andante con moto"; 5. "V. Allegretto quasi andante"; 6. "VI. Allegro Vivace"; Sonata for Concertina and Fortepiano, Op. 57 (Bernhard Molique, 1857): 7. "I. Allegro"; 8. "II. Adagio con molto expressione"; 9. "III. Rondo"; Romance (George Alexander MacFarren, 1854): 10. "Romance (Andante con moto)"	Joseph Petric (accordion), Boyd McDonald (piano)	Astrila	2007
2008	Bouliane, Gougeon, Rea	2. "En Accordéon" (Denis Gougeon, 2005)	Joseph Petric (accordion), Lorraine Vaillancourt (conductor), Nouvel Ensemble Moderne	ATMA	2006
2007	Eclipse: The Music of David Mott	Eclipse (David Mott, 2006): 1. "Part I. Event Horizon"; 2. "Part II. The Dark Shadowed Moon"; 3. "Part III. Pulsar"	Christina Petrowska-Quilico (solo piano), Kim Chow Morris (dizi), Sundar Viswanathan (soprano saxophone), Kelly Jefferson (tenor saxophone), David Mott (baritone saxophone), Suba Sakaran (voice), Bassam Shashouk (oud), Rob Clutton (double bass), Joseph Petric (accordion), John Kameel Farah (synthsizer), Ed Hanley (tabla), John Brownell (percussion)	Centrediscs (CMC)	2007
2007	The Winds of Thera: The Music of Andrew MacDonald	The Winds of Thera, Op. 44 (Andrew MacDonald, 1997): 1. "I. Rhombos"; 2. "II. Lynx"; 3. " III. The Conch of Triton"; Primavera (after Boticelli), Op. 71 (Andrew MacDonald, 2006): 4. "Primavera (after Botticelli)"	Joseph Petric (accordion), Penderecki String Quartet	Centrediscs (CMC)	2006
2006	Luciano Berio: The Complete Sequenzas I-XIV for Solo Instruments	[CD 3 of 3]: 2. "Sequenza XIII for Accordion - chanson (Luciano Berio, 1995)	Joseph Petric (accordion)	Naxos	2000
2006	Petric – Forget Duo: J.S. Bach Complete Trio Sonatas	Sonata in D Minor, BWV 527 (J. S. Bach, 1730): 1. "I. Andante"; 2. "II. Adagio e dolce"; 3. "III. Vivace"; Sonata in C Major, BWV 529 (J. S. Bach, 1730): 4. "I. Allegro"; 5. "II. Largo"; 6. "III. Allegro"; Sonata in E Minor, BWV 528 (J. S. Bach, 1730): 7. "I. Adagio - Vivace"; 8. "II. Andante"; 9. "III. Un poc' allegro"; Sonata in Eb Major, BWV 525 (J. S. Bach, 1730): 10. "I. Untitled"; 11. "II. Adagio"; 12. "III. Allegro"; Sonata in C Minor, BWV 526 (J. S. Bach, 1730): 13. "I. Vivace"; 14. "II. Largo"; 15. "III. Allegro"; Sonata in G Major, BWV 530 (J. S. Bach, 1730): 16. "I. Vivace"; 17. "II. Lente"; 18. "III. Allegro"	Joseph Petric (accordion), Norman Forget (oboe)	Odeofon	2005
2006	Petric – Forget Duo: J.S. Bach Complete Trio Sonatas	Sonata in D Minor, BWV 527 (J. S. Bach, 1730): 1. "I. Andante"; 2. "II. Adagio e dolce"; 3. "III. Vivace"; Sonata in C Major, BWV 529 (J. S. Bach, 1730): 4. "I. Allegro"; 5. "II. Largo"; 6. "III. Allegro"; Sonata in E Minor, BWV 528 (J. S. Bach, 1730): 7. "I. Adagio - Vivace"; 8. "II. Andante"; 9. "III. Un poc' allegro"; Sonata in Eb Major, BWV 525 (J. S. Bach, 1730): 10. "I. Untitled"; 11. "II. Adagio"; 12. "III. Allegro"; Sonata in C Minor, BWV 526 (J. S. Bach, 1730): 13. "I. Vivace"; 14. "II. Largo"; 15. "III. Allegro"; Sonata in G Major, BWV 530 (J. S. Bach, 1730): 16. "I. Vivace"; 17. "II. Lente"; 18. "III. Allegro"	Joseph Petric (accordion), Norman Forget (oboe)	Odeofon	2005
2005	Euphonia	Klucevsek’s Web (Janika Vandervelde, 1994): 1. "Klucevsek’s Web" (Janika Vandervelde, 1994); Seriosity (Rose Bolton, 2002–03): 2. "Seriosity" (Rose Bolton, 2002–03); Sonata for Solo Accordion (Rose Bolton, 1997): 3. "Movement I"; 4. "Movement II"; 5. "Movement III"; 6. "Movement IV"; Fondly, through the madness breathing (Micheline Roi, 2002): 7. "Fondly, through the madness breathing"; Curvilinear (Jocelyn Morlock, 2003): 8. "Curvilinear"; Low Tide (Linda Catlin Smith, 2002): 9. "Low Tide"	Joseph Petric (accordion)	Centrediscs (CMC)	2004
2004	Canadian Composer Portraits: Norma Beecroft	[CD 2 of 2]: 5. Accordion Play (Norma Beecroft, 1988)	Joseph Petric (accordion), Bill Brennan & George Morgan (percussion)	Centrediscs (CMC)	2003
2004	Dialogues and Illuminations: Jean-Philippe Rameau (1683–1764)	Pièces de Clavecin, Suite in A Minor (Rameau, 1706; arr. Joseph Petric): 1. "I. Prélude"; Pièces de Clavecin, Suite in E Minor (Rameau, 1706; arr. Joseph Petric): 2. "V. Le rappel des Oiseaux"; 3. "III. Gigue en rondeau 1"; 4. "IV. Gigue en rondeau 2"; 5. "VI. La Villageoise"; 6. "VIII. Musette en rondeau"; 7. "IX. Tambourin"; La Dauphine (Rameau, 1747; arr. Joseph Petric): 8. "La Dauphine"; Nouvelles Suites de Pièces de Clavecin, Suite in G Major (Rameau, 1726; arr. Joseph Petric): 9. "IV. La Poule"; 10. "VI. L’Enharmonique"; 11. "VIII. L’Egyptienne"; Les Indes galantes (Rameau, 1735; arr. Joseph Petric): 12. "Ouverture"; 13. "Marche des Persans"; Nouvelles Suites de Pièces de Clavecin, Suite in G Major (Rameau, 1726; arr. Joseph Petric): 14. "VII. Les Saugaves"; Pièces de Clavessin, Suite in D Major (Rameau, 1724; arr. Joseph Petric): 15. "VI. L’Entretien des Muses"; 16. "II. Les Niais de Sologne"; 17. "II. Double des Niais 1"; 18. "II. Double des Niais 2"; 19. III. Les Soupirs"; 20. "VII. Les Tourbillons"; 21. "VIII. Les Cyclopes"	Joseph Petric (accordion)	Audio Ideas	2003
2003	Mystery Theatre	1. "A Logical Conclusion (David Mott); 2. "Circles, Spirals and Spins" (David Mott & Joseph Petric); 3. "Mystery Theatre" (David Mott); 4. "Adrift on the Edge of Seas" (David Mott); 5. "Beating the Heavenly Drum" (David Mott & Joseph Petric); 6. "Tarantelle" (David Keane, 1998)	Joseph Petric (accordion), David Mott (baritone saxophone)	Victo	2002
2003	Electricities	12. "Orbiting Garden" (Christos Hatzis, 1989; arr. 1991)	Joseph Petric (accordion), tape	Centrediscs (CMC)	2003
2003	Orbiting Garden	1. "Orbiting Garden" (Christos Hatzis,1989; arr. 1991); 2. "Arghanum V" (Alcides Lanza, 1990); 3. "Fondly, through the madness breathing" (Micheline Roi, 2002); 4. "Diastema" (Tomas Dusatko, 1978); 5. "Bandoneon" (Serge Arcuri, 1991); 6. "El Duo" (Norman Symonds, 1990)	Joseph Petric (accordion), Douglas Perry (viola), Ryan Scott & Bob Becker (percussion)	Centrediscs (CMC)	2002
2001	Bach: Suites, Sonatas, Airs and Dances	English Suite No. 3 in G Minor (J. S. Bach, 1713–14): 1. "I. Prelude"; 2. "II. Allemande"; 3. "III. Courante "; 4. "IV. Sarabande"; 5. "V. Gavotte I / Gavotte ii, 'La Musette'"; 6. "VI. Gigue"; French Suite No. 2 in C Minor (J. S. Bach, 1713–14): 7. "I. Allemande"; 8. "II. Courante"; 9. "III. Sarabande"; 10. "IV. Air"; 11. "V. Menuet"; 12. "VI. Gigue"; Prussian Sonata No. 2 in Bb Major (C. P. E. Bach, 1740–42): 13. "I. Vivace"; 14. "II. Adagio"; 15. "III. Allegro assai"; Prussian Sonata No. 6 in A Major (C. P. E. Bach, 1740–42): 16. "I. Allegro"; 17. "II. Adagio"; 18. "III. Allegro"	Joseph Petric (accordion)	Analekta	2000
2001	Redemption: Concerti	Accordion Concerto (Peter Paul Koprowski, 1993): 4. "I. Festa"; 5. "II. Cantilena"; 6. "III. Danza"	Joseph Petric (solo accordion), Jukka-Pekka Saraste (conductor), Toronto Symphony Orchestra	CBC	1998
2001	Bellows and Brass … and Boyd	1. "Tango" (Boyd MacDonald, 1997); 3. "Three Accords" (Boyd MacDonald, 1995); 6. "Overture for Accordion and Piano" (Boyd MacDonald, 1994)	Joseph Petric (accordion), Guy Few (trumpet), Alain Trudel (trombone), Boyd McDonald (piano)	Springdale	2001
2000	Sondes	6. "Convergence" (Randall Smith, 1998)	Joseph Petric (accordion), fixed medium electronics	empreintes DIGITALes	2000
1998	Tango Nuevo: The Music of Astor Piazzolla	5. "Double Concerto for Guitar and Accordion" (Astor Piazzolla, 1985)	Joseph Petric (accordion), Sylvia Proulx (guitar)	Zorro	1998
1998	The Grainger Edition, Vol. 9: Works for Chorus and Orchestra	17. "Molly on the Shore (Percy Grainger, 1907; arr. 1920)	Joseph Petric (accordion), Richard Hickox (conductor), City of London Sinfonia, Tim Hugh (solo cello), Joyful Company of Singers, Susan Gritton (solo soprano), Mark Tucker (solo tenor)	Chandos	1998
1997	Padre Antonio Soler	1. "Sonata in D Major, R.92" (Soler for all tracks); 2. "Sonata in G Minor, R.94"; 3. "Sonata in G Major, R.94"; 4. "Sonata in E Minor, R.94b"; 5. "Sonata in G Major, R.94b"; 6. "Sonata in D Minor, R.104"; 7. "Sonata in F Major, R.56"; 8. "Sonata in Bb Major, R.62"; 9. "Sonata in Bb Major, R.62"	Joseph Petric (accordion)	Analekta	1996
1993	Anecdotes: Music of Yves Daoust	6. "L'entrevue" (Yves Daoust, 1991)	Joseph Petric (accordion), fixed medium electronics	empreintes DIGITALes	1993
1991	Catbird Seat – Canadian Electronic Ensemble	6. "Davies" (Canadian Electronic Ensemble, 1990)	Joseph Petric (accordion), Canadian Electronic Ensemble	Trappist	1991
1991	Joseph Petric: Accordion	Sonata No. 62 in Bb Major (Padre Antonio Soler, 1782): 1. "IV. Allegro Spiritoso"; Adagio und Rondo, K.617 (Wolfgang A. Mozart, 1791): 2. "Adagio"; 3. "Rondo (Allegretto)"; Two Solo Sonatas (Domenico Scarlatti, n.d.): 4. "Sonata in C Major, K. 159: Allegro"; 5. "Sonata in C Major, K. 406: Allegro"; Six Songs Without Words (Wilhelm Bernhard Molique, n.d.): 6. "If O'er the Boundless Sky"; 7. "Fair Annie"; 8. "When The Moon Is Brightly Shining"; 9. "Come All Ye Glad and Free"; 10. "Come Dearest, Come" (By Prince Albert); 11. "O That My Woes Were Distant"; Sonata for Pianoforte and Concertina, Op. 57 (Wilhelm Bernhard Molique, 1857): 12. "Allegro"; 13. "Adagio Con Molto Espressione"; 14. "Rondo"; Suite for Accordion and Piano / Four Pieces Based on East Coast Canadian Folksongs (Andrew Huggett, 1990): 15. "She's Like the Swallow"; 16. "I'se The B'y (That Builds The Boat)"; 17. "The Belle Isle Bolero"; 18. "En Roulant Ma Boule Roulant"	Joseph Petric (accordion), Marie Bérard & Moshe Hammer (violin), Douglas Perry (viola), David Hetherington (cello), Guy Few (piano), Erica Goodman (harp)	Musica Viva (CBC)	1991
1991	Procession: The Music of Marjan Mozetich	2. "Dance of the Blind" (Marjan Mozetich, 1980)	Joseph Petric (accordion), Amadeus Ensemble	Musica Viva (CBC)	1989
1989	GEMS: Contemporary Works for Accordion	1. "Pneuma" (Peter Hatch, 1987); 2. "Equivoque" (Christos Hatzis, 1985); 3. "Melodia" (Toshio Hosokawa, 1979); 4. "Sonic Eclipse" (Richard Romiti, 1980); 5. "St. George Blues" (Daniel Foley, 1985); 6. "Trio Sonata" (Bengt Hambraeus,1985)	Joseph Petric (accordion), David Hetherington (cello), Douglas Perry (viola), Marc Donatelle (trombone), Christina Petrowska (piano)	ConAccord	1989
1988	Flying High	[SIDE A] Six Characteristic Pieces for Concertina and Piano, Op.61 (Bernhard Molique, 1859): A1. "I. Bolero"; A2. "II. Consolation"; A3. "III. Country Dance"; A4. "IV. Sorrow"; A5. "V. Prayer"; A6. "VI. Serenade"; Histoires (Jacques Ibert, 1922; arr. Joseph Petric): A7. "IX. La marchande d'eau fraîche; A8. "X. Le cortège de Balkis"; A9. "II. Le petit ane blanc; [SIDE B] Sonata in F Major, K. 17 (Domenico Scarlatti, 1738; arr. Joseph Petric): B1. "Sonata in F Major, K. 17"; Sonata in E Major, K. 20 (Domenico Scarlatti, 1738; arr. Joseph Petric): B2. "Sonata in E Major, K. 20"; Andante for Mechanical Organ, K. 616 (Wolfgang A. Mozart, 1791; arr. Joseph Petric): B3. "Andante for Mechanical Organ, K. 616"; In the Zoo, Op. 164 (Niels Viggo Bentzon, 1998): B4. "Promenade / The Ostrich"; B5. "Promenade / The Elephant"; B6. "Promenade / The Sea Lion"; B7. "Promenade / Tea with the Cockatoos"; B8. "Promenade / The Dromedary"; B9. "Promenade / The Monkeys"	Joseph Petric (accordion)	World Records	1988
1986	Shadow Box	2. "Shadow Box" (David Jaeger, 1986)	Joseph Petric (accordion), digital delay	Centrediscs (CMC)	1986
1986	The Eyes of Bidesuk	1. "The Eyes of Bidesuk" (Norman Symonds, 1986)	Joseph Petric (solo accordion), Jerry Danovitch (conductor), McGill Jazz Big Band	Radio Canada Internationale	1986
