= Alba Lucía Potes Cortés =

Alba Potes
- Born: 28 June 1954 (age 72); Cali, Colombia
- Citizenship: Colombian/USA
- Education: Antonio M. Valencia conservatory; University of Valle; Temple University
- Occupations: Composer; Music educator; Founder and director, Las Américas en Concierto
- Style: Contemporary
- Website: albapotes.com

Alba Lucía Potes Cortés (born 1954) is a composer of contemporary classical music, and teacher at the Mannes School of Music, College Preparatory Division, in New York.

== Life ==
Born in Cali, Colombia, she studied at the Antonio M. Valencia conservatory, and the University of Valle in Cali Colombia, where she studied with Leon J. Simar. In 1983, she moved to the United States. She graduated from Temple University degree in music theory, cum laude, and with a master's and doctorate in composition. She studied with Matthew Greenbaum, Ursula Mamlok and Maurice Wright.

She lives in New York City.

== Career ==
Alba Potes' compositions have been performed by the Montreal Chamber Orchestra, National Symphony of Colombia, National Philharmonic Orchestra of Venezuela, Darmstadt 2000 Internationale Ferienkurse für Neue Musik, the Symphony Orchestra of Cali, Festival Internacional Cervantino, International Alliance for Women in Music, the ISCM in New York, Parnassus, the Composer's Conference at Wellesley College, the Network for New Music, Momenta Quartet, The Stefan Wolpe Society, the New York New Music Ensemble, the Institute for New Music in Freiburg, Germany, the ISCM in Seoul, South Korea and at International Musical Festivals in Germany, México, El Salvador, England, Colombia, Brazil and Venezuela. Her music has been performed by soprano Susan Narucki, pianists David Holtzman, Charles Abramovic, Martha Marchena, Ana Cervantes, and Blair McMiller, saxophonist Marshall Taylor, percussionist Mircea Ardeleanu and violist Stephanie Griffin.

== Awards and commissions ==
Her orchestral compositions "Cantares para Orquesta" and "Reflexiones" were winners of the 2002 New Music Reading Sessions of The Women's Philharmonic in San Francisco, and the 1994 Riverside Symphony's First International Composers Reading Project in New York.

Alba Potes is a winner of the 2001–2002 Music of Changes Composer Competition in Los Angeles that included a concert dedicated to her music. Ms. Potes has received commissions from, among others, the Ministry of Culture of Colombia (De las Travesuras y Percances del Amor), Music of Changes (Y la brisa trae aroma de cadmia), the Independence Foundation Fellowship in the Arts in Philadelphia (Oleajes), Colombia's Luis Angel Arango Recital Hall/Banco de la República (Entre Arrullos y Madrigales), Office of Academic Affairs of Hostos Community College (Dulzuras) and consecutive ASCAP awards (1998–2008). Celebrating Women's Month in March 2006, the Latin American Cultural Center of Queens and the Women's Council of New York recognized her for her outstanding achievements as a composer. Her music is published by the Ministry of Culture of Colombia (A los Pájaros) and Hildegard Publishing Company (Tres Miniaturas para las Mariposas Ausentes).

== Reviews ==
- 15 April 1995: Josiah Fisk, Boston Herald, Classical Music: Title: "Parnassus does its new-music best"
- 18 April 1995: Richard Bell, The Boston Globe Title: "Parnassus plays "What if?"
- 4 November 1997: Daniel Webster, The Philadelphia Inquirer Title: "School's Contemporary Players open season"
- 26 November 1998: Anthony Tommasini, The New York Times Title: "Gnarly Trills, Honking Winds: The Future Beckons"
- April 2010: Andrew Druckenbrod, Gramophone Review of Martha Marchena's CD: Casi una pregunta/Almost a Question/Latin American Piano Music in the 21st Century
