= List of compositions by Elisabeth Lutyens =

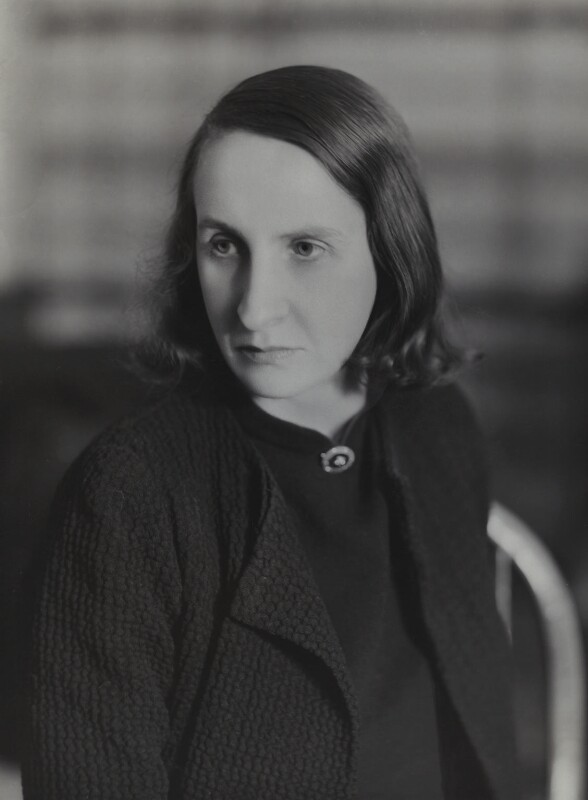
Lutyens in 1939

This is a list of compositions by Elisabeth Lutyens (1906–83), a British composer of contemporary classical music. Lutyens's music was published by numerous publishers.

== Sources ==
This list is based on that compiled by Glyn Perrin in New Music 88, with corrections and additions from A Pilgrim Soul: Life and Work of Elisabeth Lutyens by Meirion and Susie Harries (1989).

== Publishers ==
- AUG = Augener
- CHE = J & W Chester
- dW = de Wolfe
- LEN = Lengnick
- MIL = Belwin Mills Music Ltd.
- NOV = Novello/Wise
- OUP = Oxford University Press
- SCH = Schott Music
- UYMP = University of York Music Press
- YOR = Yorke Edition

== List of works ==
Year	Opus	Title	Scoring	Duration	Premiere	Performer(s)	Recording	Publisher	Note
1937	—	The Check Book	piano (for children)	10'			CD	AUG	
1937	Op. 5 No. 1	String Quartet No. 1	string quartet		1939-02 London				destroyed
1938	Op. 5 No. 4	Sonata for Solo Viola	viola	11'	1950-08-20 Darmstadt?	Michael Mann?		LEN	
1938	Op. 5 No. 5	String Quartet No. 2	string quartet	19'	1939-04-17 (probably) Warsaw			LEN	
1939	Op. 5 No. 6	String Trio		8'	1945-05-03 London			LEN	
1939	Op. 7	Three Pieces for Orchestra		4'	1940-09-07 London			CHE	
1939	Op. 8 No. 1	Chamber Concerto	nine instruments	9'	1943-06-11 London		CD	CHE	
1940-41	Op. 8 No. 2	Chamber Concerto	clarinet, ten sax, piano, string orchestra	10'	1945?			CHE	
1941	Op. 9	Five Intermezzi	piano	6'	1946 Paris or 1947-11-16 BBC		LP CD CD	LEN	
1942	—	Three Symphonic Preludes	orch	12'	1946-07-07 London			MIL	The score is now considered lost
1942	—	Two Songs	voice, piano		1945-11-17 Wigmore Hall	Hedli Anderson/Norman Franklin	CD	UYMP	Text: W. H. Auden
1942	Op. 10	Nine Bagatelles	cello, piano	6'			CD	LEN/IMP	
1944	—	Suite Gauloise	violin, piano	12'				dW	
1945	Op. 8 No. 3	Chamber Concerto	bassoon, string orchestra, percussion	10'	1946-01-18 London			CHE	
1945	Op. 14 No. 1	Five Little Pieces	clarinet, piano	5'	1962-11-03 London		CD	SCH	
1946	Op. 13	Ô Saisons, Ô Châteaux, Cantata	soprano, strings	7'	1947-02-11 Wigmore	Margaret Field-Hyde, Kathleen Merritt String Orch	LP CD	MIL	Text: Arthur Rimbaud
1946	-	Air-Dance-Ground (from Dido & Aeneas)	viola, piano					CHE	arrangement of Henry Purcell
1946-47	Op. 8 no. 4	Chamber Concerto	horn, small orchestra	12'	1948-06-12			CHE	ded: Dennis Brain
1946-47	Op. 8 No. 5	Chamber Concerto	string quartet, small orchestra	12'				?CHE	
1947	Op. 14	The Pit, Dramatic Scene	tenor and bass soli, women's chorus, orchestra	30'				MIL	Text: W. R. Rodgers
1947	Op. 15	Concerto for Viola and Orchestra	vla, orch	15'	1950-09-08 London	Frederick Riddle, soloist, with BBCSO and John Hollingsworth		LEN	
1948	Op. 16	Requiem for the Living	soli/chorus/orchestra		1952-09-30				
1948	Op. 17	Suite	solo organ	6'	1951-06-16 London		CD	unpubl.	ded: Edward Clark
1948	—	Aptote	solo violin	9'	1948-03-02? London			LEN	
1948	—	Three Improvisations	piano	6'			CD CD	LEN	
1948	—	Nine Songs	voice, piano	13'			LP/CD	UYMP	Text: Stevie Smith
1948	—	Ninepins	2 violins (teacher/pupil)					MIL	
1949	Op. 18	String Quartet No. 3	string quartet	14'	1951-01-23			LEN	
1949	Op. 19	Ballet	9 wind and perc		unperformed				
1950	Op. 20	Prelude and capriccio	solo cello	6'				LEN	
1950	Op. 22	Concertante for Five Players	fl(picc).cl(bcl).vln(va).vc.pno	10'	1952-02-11 Hampstead			MIL	
1951	—	Nativity	soprano, string orchestra (or organ)	6'	1951-06-05 London		CD CD	NOV	Text: W. R. Rodgers
1952	-	String Quartet No. 4	string quartet		unperformed			-	
1952	-	String Quartet No. 5	string quartet		unperformed			-	
1952	Op. 25	String Quartet No. 6	string quartet	8'	1954-12-06 London		LP LP/CD	MIL	
1952	Op. 27	Excerpta Tractati Logico-Philosophici (Motet)	unaccompanied chorus	10'	1954-08 Dartington	-	LP CD	SCH	Text: Ludwig Wittgenstein. Commissioned by William Glock
1953-54	Op. 28	Valediction	cl, pno	10'	1954-06-15 London		LP CD	MIL	
1954	Op. 29	Infidelio	sop, ten, 7 instr	40'	1973-04-17			UYMP	
1955	Op. 30	Nocturnes	vln, gtr, vc	6'	1954-12-10 London	Emanuel Hurwitz, Terence Weil, Julian Bream		SCH	
1955	Op. 31	Music for Orchestra I		20'	1961-01-06	BBC SO/Maderna	CD	MIL	
1955	Op. 32	Sinfonia	organ	7'	1956-04-21 RFH	Ralph Downes	CD	SCH	
1955	Op. 33	Capriccii	2 hp, perc	8'	1984-12-04 Wigmore Hall - OR London 1955-12-12			SCH	
1956-57	Op. 34 No. 1	Sonance (Duo)	hn/pno	10'				SCH	
1956-57	Op. 34 No. 2	Duo	vc/pno	10'				SCH	
1956-57	Op. 34 No. 3	Duo	vln/pno	11'				SCH	see Op. 41
1956	Op. 36	Chorale for Orchestra	orch	4'	1971	RPO		SCH	ded: to
1956/65	Op. 37	In The Temple Of A Bird's Wing	bar, pno	duration	1966, Arts Council Drawing Room	Benjamin Luxon, Paul Hamburger		UYMP	
1957	Op. 38	Variations	flute	4'30"	1960-11-18 London		CD	MIL	
1957	Op. 39	De Amore	soprano, tenor, mixed chorus and orchestra	40'	1973-09-07, BBC Proms	Jane Manning, Philip Langridge, BBC Singers, London Choral Society, BBC SO, Leon Lovett		SCH	
1957	Op. 41	Fantasie-Variations	vln/pno	11'	-	-	-	-	see Op. 34 no. 3
1957	Op. 42	Six Tempi	10 instr	13'	1959 London		CD	MIL	
1956	Op. 43	Piano e Forte	piano	15'	1960 London		LP CD	MIL	
1960	Op. 44	Quincunx	bar, sop, orch	20'	1962-07-12 Cheltenham		LP/CD	UYMP	
1960	Op. 45	Wind Quintet	fl.ob.cl.bsn.hn	12'			LP	MIL	
1961	Op. 46	Symphonies for solo piano, wind, harps and percussion	wind/hp/perc	17'	1961-07-28 Proms	Katharina Wolpe, Malcolm Sargent, BBC SO		SCH	
1961	Op. 47	Catena	sop, ten, 21 instruments	40'	1965-06-08 BBC Concert Hall	Dorothy Dorow, Gerald English, ECO, Norman Del Mar		SCH	
1962	Op. 48	Music for Orchestra II	orch	11'	1969-03-23 or Straßburg 1962-09	BBC SO		SCH	
1962	Op. 49	Five Bagatelles	piano	5'	1963-10-10 Liverpool	Katharina Wolpe	LP LP CD CD	SCH	
1957/1963	Op. 50	The Country of the Stars	unaccompanied chorus	10'	1963-03-20		CD, IonianUsk	NOV	
1963	Op. 51	String Quintet	2vln.vla.2vc	21'	1976-05-12 Manchester	Roland Fudge, Peter Nutting (vln), Avril Schepens (vla) Elizabeth Brierley, Nigel Blomiley (vc)		SCH	
1963	Op. 52	Wind Trio	fl, cl, bsn	10'	1963-12-10 Concert Hall, BBC Broadcasting House	Douglas Whittaker, Colin Bradbury, Geoffrey Gambold	CD	SCH	
1963	Op. 53	Présages	ob	9'	1965, Wigmore Hall	Janet Craxton	CD	UYMP	
1963	Op. 54	Encomion	chorus, brass, percussion	17'	1964-04-15 Liverpool Metropolitan Cathedral	Sandon Ensemble		SCH	
1963	Op. 55	Fantasie Trio	fl, cl, pno	11'	1963-12 Dublin	Chantry Ensemble	CD	UYMP	
1963	Op. 56	Music for Orchestra III	orch	14'	1967-07-19 or 1967-07-17	Polish Radio Orchestra		SCH	
1964	Op. 57	String Trio	vln, via, vc	10'	1965-12-05 London		CD	SCH	
1964	Op. 58	Scena	vln, vc, perc	13'	1965-12-10 London			SCH	
1963	Op. 59	Music for Piano and Orchestra	orchestra	10’	1975-12-17 Hilversum (NL)	Radio Filharmonisch Orkest	CD	SCH	
1964	Op. 60	Music for Wind	double quintet	11'	1965-12-15 or Liverpool 1965-06-24	Portia Ensemble		SCH	
1964/5	Op. 61	The hymn of a man	mixed choir	10'				-	see Op. 61 below
1965	Op. 62	The Valley Of Hatsu-Se	sop, ens	10'	1965-08-06 Dartington		CD	UYMP	
1965	-	Magnificat and Nunc Dimitis	SATB	11'	-	-	CD	SCH	
1965-67	Op. 63	The Numbered	opera	120'	unperformed			UYMP	opera in prologue and two acts
1966	Op. 64	Akapotik Rose	sop, ens	18'	1966-08 Dartington	Jane Manning, Vesuvius Ensemble		UYMP	
1966	Op. 65	Music for Three	ob, fl, pno	12'				UYMP	comm: Mabillon Trio
1966	Op. 66	And Suddenly it's Evening	tenor and ensemble	25'	1967-03-03 QEH London	Herbert Handt, Members of the BBC SO	LP/CD	SCH	
1966	-	A Sleep of Prisoners	organ	11'	1966-02-28, St George's Cath., Perth, Aus.		CD	unpubl.	
1967	Op. 67 No. 1	Novenaria	orch	12'	1969-02-16	BBC Training Orchestra, Walter Susskind		UYMP	
1967	Op. 67 No. 2	Helix	piano duet	9'	1968-02-16 London	Bradshaw/RRB		UYMP	
1967	Op. 67 No. 3	Scroll For Li-Ho	vln, pno	17'	1968-04-08 London	Peter Carter, Sally Mays		UYMP	
1968	Op. 67 No. ?3 or Op. 86?	Epithalamion	sop, org	8'	St Mary's Church, Disley		CD	UYMP	
1968	Op. 67 No. 4	Horai	hn, vln, pno	16'	1969-04-24 Stoke-on-Trent	Liverpool Horn Trio		UYMP	
1967-8	Op. 68	Time Off? — Not A Ghost Of A Chance!	music theatre	80'	1972-03-01 London			UYMP	
1968	Op. 69	Essence Of Our Happinesses	ten, ch, orch	26'	1970-09-08 Proms			UYMP	
1968	Op. 70	The Tyme Doth Flete	chorus, optional brass	8'/10'				UYMP	
1968	Op. 71	A Phoenix	sop, cl, von, pno	6'				UYMP	
1968	Op. 71a	A Phoenix	sop, pno	6'	1969-10-06	Jane Manning, Susan McGraw		UYMP	
1969	Op. 72	Temenos	organ	9' 30"			CD	UYMP	
1969	Op. 73	The Dying Of The Sun	guitar	6'	1969, Wigmore Hall	Gilbert Biberian		UYMP	
1969-70	Op. 74	Isis and Osiris, lyric drama	8 voices, orch	135'	1976-11-26 Morley College			UYMP	
1969	Op. 74a	Lament of Isis on the death of Osiris	sop	5'	1969-10-06 BBC	Jane Manning	CD	UYMP	
1969	Op. 74b	Trois Pièces Brèves	org	9'	1969-12-09 Dartington	Nicholas Danby	CD	UYMP	
1969	Op. 75	The Tides of Time	doublebass, piano	6'	1970-10-22 London	Rodney Slatford	CD	YOR	
1970	Op. 61a	The hymn of a man	mixed choir	10'				UYMP	revision of Op. 61
1970	Op. 76	In The Direction Of The Beginning	bass, piano	16'	1979-09-08 BBC	Ian Caddy, Jennifer Coultas		UYMP	
1970	Op. 77	Anerca	speaker/actress, 10 gt, perc	9'	1971-05-04 Wigmore Hall	Freda Dowie, Omegia Ensemble, Gilbert Biberian		UYMP	
1970	Op. 78	Oda A La Tormenta	mez, pno	18'	1971-01-15 PLG, Purcell Room	Eiko Nakamura/Roger Smalley		UYMP	
1970	Op. 79	Vision Of Youth	sop, ens	23'	1972-11-13 London	Jane Manning, Matrix		UYMP	comm: Matrix
1970	Op. 80	Islands	sop, ten, narr, ens	26'	1971-06-07, St John's Smith Square	LS/Atherton		UYMP	
1971?	-	Verses of Love	choir	7'			CD, CD CD	NOV	
1971	Op. 81	Driving Out The Death	ob, str trio	15'	1972-02-20 Wigmore Hall	London Oboe Quartet	CD	UYMP	
1971	Op. 82	The Tears of Night	voices and ens	13'	1972-03-03 London			UYMP	
1971	-	Requiescat	sop, string trio	5'	1971-08-15 BBC	Jane Manning, Tunnell String Trio	CD CD	UYMP	In Memoriam Igor Stravinsky
1971	Op. 83	Dirge For The Proud World	sop, c-ten, vc, hpd	9'	1971-12-13 Paris			UYMP	
1972	Op. 84	Voice of Quiet Waters	ch, orch	16'	1973-04-14 Huddersfield	Leeds Festival Chorus, BBC Northern SO, Bryden Thomson		UYMP	
1972	Op. 85	Counting Your Steps	ch	16'	1972-05-22 London			UYMP	
1972	Op. 86	Chimes and Cantos	bar, ens	7'	1972-04-23 London			UYMP	
1972	Op. 87	Plenum I	piano	12'	1972	Katharina Wolpe	LP CD	UYMP	
1972	Op. 88	Dialogo	ten, lute	14'	1972-11-12 London			UYMP	
1972	Op. 89	The Linnet From The Leaf	singers, ens	40'	1979-11-11			UYMP	
1973	Op. 90	Rape Of The Moone	ens	14'				UYMP	
1973	Op. 91	The Waiting Game, 3 scenes	mez, bar, orch	40'	unperformed			UYMP	
1973	Op. 92	Plenum II	ob, ens	23'	1974-06-14, QEH	Janet Craxton, LS, Andrew Davis		UYMP	
1973	Op. 93	Plenum III (String Quartet No. 7)	string quartet	9‘	1974-05-06 London			UYMP	
1973	Op. 94	Tre	clarinet	9'	1977-02-27	Alan Hacker		UYMP	
1973	Op. 95	Roads	2 sop, c-ten, ten, bar, bs	14'	1974-07-06 Cheltenham			UYMP	
1973	Op. 96	Laudi	sop, ens	16'	1974-11-11, University of Nottingham	Matrix		UYMP	
1973	Op. 97	One And The Same	sop, spkr, mimes, ensemble	27'	1976-06-21 York			UYMP	
1974	Op. 98	The Winter of The World	2 orchs	16'	1974-05-05 London			UYMP	
1974	Op. 99	Kareniana	vla, ens	14'	unperformed			UYMP	
1975	Op. 100	Plenum IV (What Is The Wind, What Is It)	2 organs	duration	1975-03-05 RFH, London	Stephen and Nicholas Cleobury	LP CD	UYMP	
1975	Op. 101	Eos	orch	10'	1975-02-24 Nottingham		CD	UYMP	
1975	Op. 102	The Goldfish Bowl	opera	120'				UYMP	"scrapped"
1975	Op. 103	This Green Tide	basset horn, pno	10'			LP	UYMP	
1975	Op. 104	Pietà	harpsichord	9'	1977-02-06	Colin Tilney		UYMP	comm: Colin Tilney in memory of Dallapiccola
1975	Op. 105	Go, Said the Bird	e-guitar, string quartet	12'	1976-07-02 Bath	Mitchell Dalton, Chilingirian Quartet		UYMP	
1975	Op. 106	The Ring of Bone	piano, optional speaking voice	10'	1976-05-12 Manchester	Peter Lawson	LP CD CD CD	UYMP	
1975	-	Fanfare for a Festival	3 tpt, 3 tbn	4’	1976-06-05 York Festival	Equale Brass	CD	UYMP	
1976	Op. 107	Mare et Minutiae (String Quartet No. 8)	string quartet	17’	1976-06-12 York	Medici Quartet		UYMP	
1976	Op. 108	Rondel	chamber orchestra	15'	1978-04-25 Liverpool	RLPO		UYMP	
1976	Op. 109	Like A Window	actor, singers, flute, cello	25'	1977-11-24			UYMP	
1976	Op. 110	Constants	cello and piano	15'	1977-01-30 London	Joan Dickson/Joyce Rathbone?	CD	UYMP	comm: Joan Dickson and Joyce Rathbone
1976	Op. 111	Nocturnes and Interludes	sop, pno	18'	unperformed			UYMP	
1976	Op. 111a	It Is The Hour	mixed unaccompanied chorus	5'	1976-09-29 Malton			UYMP	
1976	Op. 112	Concert Aria	female voice, orchestra	12'	unperformed			UYMP	Text: anon French
1976	Op. 113	Six Bagatelles	Chamber orch	14'	1996-03-16 Bristol	Brunel Ensemble, Christopher Austin	CD	UYMP	
1977	Op. 114	Fantasia	alto sax and 3 instrumental groupa	13'	unperformed			UYMP	
1977	Op. 115	Winter Series — Spring Sowing	sop, pno	40'	1979-02-21 RNCM	Jane Manning, Richard Rodney Bennett		UYMP	
1977	Op. 116	Five Impromptus	piano	10'	2018-10-30 Wigmore	Nicolas Hodges	CD	UYMP	
1977	Op. 117	Cascando	contralto, violin, string orchestra	10'	1979-12-04 Hilversum			UYMP	
1977	Op. 118	Nox	solo piano and 2 chamber orchestras	14'	1983-12-15 London			UYMP	
1977	Op. 119	Madrigal	oboe & violin	8'	1981-01-21 Redcliffe Concert	Janet Craxton, Perry Hart		UYMP	
1977	Op. 120	By All These	sop, gtr	7'	1981-03-30 BMIC	Alison Horriben, Nick Hooper		UYMP	
1977	Op. 121	Romanza	solo guitar	9'	Kenneth Meyer https://www.youtube.com/watch?v=W-8P80SGTPA			UYMP	
1977	Op. 122	O Absalom...	oboe (cor anglaise), vn, via, vc	12'	1978-06-14 London		CD	UYMP	
1977	Op. 123	Chorale Prelude and Paraphrase	string quintet, tenor, piano, 3 percussion	16'	unperformed			UYMP	
1978	Op. 124	Tides	chamber orchestra	12-13'	unperformed			UYMP	
1978	Op. 125	Doubles (String Quartet No. 9)	string quartet	10‘	1979-03-18 Hampstead	Medici Quartet		UYMP	comm: Medici Quartet
1978	Op. 126	Seven Preludes	piano	22'	1978-09-04 London		CD CD	UYMP	
1978	Op. 127	Elegy of the Flowers	tenor, 3 instrumental groups	13'	1980-01-26 London	Philip Langridge		UYMP	
1978	Op. 128	Footfalls	flute/piano	8'	1979-02-07, Purcell Room	Ann Cherry, Jeremy Brown	LP	UYMP	
1979	Op. 129	Echoi	mezzo-soprano, orchestra	13'	1980-07-01	Elise Ross, BBC Scottish, Simon Rattle		UYMP	
1979	Op. 130	Cantata	dramatic soprano, instrumental ensemble	16'				UYMP	
1979	Op. 131	She Tells Her Love While Half Asleep	soprano	5'	1983-91-18 BBC	Dorothy Dorow		UYMP	
1979	Op. 132	The Great Seas	piano	20'	1979-12-18 BMIC	Michael Finnissy	CD	UYMP	
1979	Op. 133	Prelude	violin	9'	1981-01-21			UYMP	comm: Perry Hart
1979	Op. 134	Cantata	sop, alto, baritone, 8 instruments	13'	unperformed			UYMP	
1979	Op. 135	Trio	cl, vc, pno	13'	1980-05-22	Muhifeld Trio	CD	UYMP	
1979	Op. 136	The Roots Of The World	mixed chorus, cello	12'	1988-04-14	Lowri Blake, BBC Singers/Ionian Singers?, James Wood		UYMP	
1979	Op. 137	That Sun	contralto, piano	11'	1980-01-07 Purcell Room	Susan Tyrrell, David Owen Norris		UYMP	
1979	Op. 138	Echoes	contralto, afl, ca, 2 vn, va, vc	11'	1981-06-28 Bracknell	Sue Anderson, Suoraan		UYMP	
1979	Op. 139	String Quartet No. 10	string quartet	10’	1980-11-09 Edinburgh	Edinburgh Quartet		UYMP	
1979	Op. 140	Morning Sea	ob/ob d'amore, pno	13'	1981-12-18 Wigmore Hall	Robin Canter, Lynn Hendry		UYMP	
1979	Op. 141	Three Books of Bagatelles	piano	12'/7'15"/12'		Michael Finnissy (book 1)		UYMP	
1980	Op. 142	Concert Aria ('Dialogo')	high sop and orchestra	13'	1981-07-12 Cheltenham	Deborah Cook, City of London Sinfonia, Richard Hickox		UYMP	
1980	Op. 143	Mine Eyes, My Bread, My Spade	bar, string quartet	13'	1981-07-22 Wigmore Hall	Ian Caddy, Delme String Quartet		UYMP	
1980	Op. 144	Rapprochement	hn, hp, ens	15'	1981-11-03	Anthony Halstead, Frances Kelley, Lontano, Lionel Friend		UYMP	
1980	Op. 145	Déroulement	oboe, guitar	11'	unperformed	-	-	UYMP	
1980	Op. 146	Diurnal (String Quartet No. 11)	string quartet	15’	1981-12-21 Altrincham	Medici Quartet		UYMP	
1980	Op. 147	Six	cl(+bcl,Ebcl), tp(+Dtp,flg), pf, perc, vn, cb	15'	1981-05-16 Purcell Room	Lysis	-	UYMP	
1980	Op. 148	Soli	cl (+ bass-cl), double bass	7'	1981-05-16 Purcell Room (or 1980-12-13 London)	Lysis	-	UYMP	
1980	Op. 149	Wild Decembers	orch	12'	1982-03-14 Bletchley	Philharmonia, Sir Charles Groves		UYMP	
1980	Op. 150	Fleur du Silence	ten, ensemble	14'	1981-08-02 London			UYMP	
1980	Op. 151	The Singing Birds	speaker, vla	10'	unperformed			UYMP	
1981	Op. 152	Music For Orchestra IV	orch without violins	13'	1983-12-15 London			UYMP	
1981	Op. 153	Branches of The Night And Of The Day	hn, string quartet	8'	1981-10-09			UYMP	
1981	Op. 154	La Natura dell'Acqua	piano	8'-9'	1984-10-28 London		CD CD	UYMP	
1981	Op. 155	String Quartet No. 12	string quartet	9‘	1982-08-05 Harrogate			UYMP	
1981	Op. 156	The Living Night	percussion	13'	1982-06-23 St Bartholomew the Great's	James Wood		UYMP	
1981	Op. 157	Echo Of The Wind	viola	7'	1984-07-19		CD CD	UYMP	
1982	Op. 158	String Quartet No. 13	string quartet	10-11’	1983-03-16 Wigmore	Edinburgh Quartet		UYMP	
1982	Op. 159	Encore-Maybe	piano	9'	1983-03-07 Wigmore Hall	Thalia Myers	CD CD	?	
1982	Op. 160a	Triolet I	clarinet, mandolin, cello	10'	1984-12-04 London		CD	UYMP	
1983	Op. 160b	Triolet II	cello, marimba, harp	9'	1984-12-04 London		CD	UYMP	
n.d.	-	Chorale Prelude	organ	4'			CD	unpubl.	
n.d.	-	The Virgin's Cradle Hymn	unison choir					OUP	

== Sources ==
- Forkert, Annika (2023). Elisabeth Lutyens and Edward Clark: The Orchestration of Progress in British Twentieth-Century Music. Cambridge University Press. ISBN 978-1-009-33735-9.
