= Stefan Wolpe =

German-American composer (1902–1972)

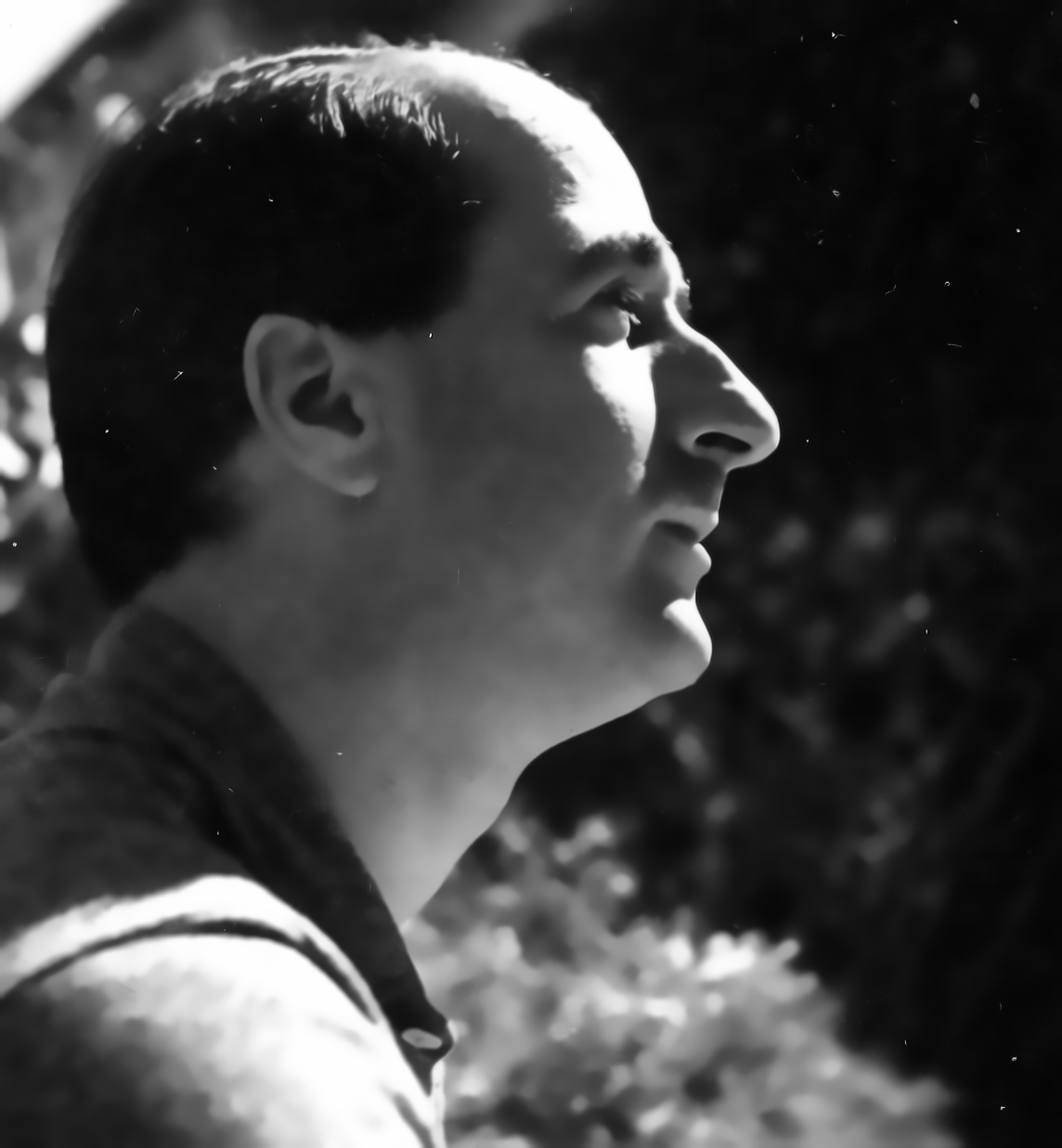
Wolpe in Jerusalem (c. 1938)

Stefan Wolpe (25 August 1902 – 4 April 1972) was a German-born American composer. He was associated with interdisciplinary modernism, with affiliations ranging from the Bauhaus, Berlin agitprop theater and the kibbutz movement to the Eighth Street Artists' Club, Black Mountain College, and the Darmstadt Summer Courses for New Music. He lived and worked in Berlin (1902–1933) until the Nazi seizure of power forced him to move first to Vienna (1933–34) and Jerusalem (1934–38) before settling in New York City (1938–72). In works such as Battle Piece (1942/1947) and "In a State of Flight" in Enactments for Three Pianos (1953), he responded self-consciously to the circumstances of his uprooted life, a theme he also explored extensively in voluminous diaries, correspondence, and lectures. His densely eclectic music absorbed ideas and idioms from diverse artistic milieus, including post-tonality, bebop, and Arab classical musics.

== Life ==
Wolpe was born in Berlin to Jewish parents. He attended the Klindworth-Scharwenka Conservatory from the age of fourteen, and for one semester the State Academic College of Music in Berlin (currently: Berlin University of the Arts). He studied composition under Franz Schreker and was also a pupil of Ferruccio Busoni. He also studied at the Bauhaus circa 1923, and met some of the dadaists, setting Kurt Schwitters's poem An Anna Blume to music.

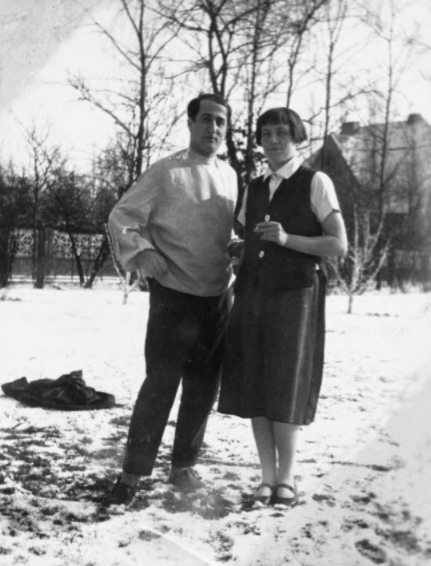
Stefan and Ola Wolpe in 1927

In 1928, Wolpe's first opera, Zeus und Elida, premiered in Berlin. This soon was followed by two more operas in 1929, Schöne Geschichten and Anna Blume. In 1927, he married the artist Ola Okuniewska from Czechoslovakia and their daughter, Katharina Wolpe, was born in 1931, but the couple had separated. His wife escaped to London in 1938, but his daughter was a de facto orphan in Berne during the war.

The music Wolpe was writing between 1929 and 1933 was dissonant, using Arnold Schoenberg's twelve-tone technique. However, possibly influenced by Paul Hindemith's concept of Gebrauchsmusik (music that serves a social function), and as an avid socialist, he wrote a number of pieces for workers' unions and communist theatre groups. For these, he made his style more accessible, incorporating elements of jazz and popular music.

When the Nazis came to power in Germany, Wolpe, a Jew and a communist, fled the country, first to his sister in Czechoslovakia, and then to Zurich. After a brief visit to the Soviet Union, Wolpe continued for a short stay in Vienna in 1933, where he met and studied with Anton Webern. With his partner, Irma Schoenberg, he then moved to Romania and shortly afterwards to Palestine, where he wrote simple songs for the kibbutzim, and sought to create an amalgam of Western, Mizrahi music and Arab influences. The music he was writing for concert performance, however, remained complex and atonal. Partly because of this, his teaching contract with the Palestine Conservatoire was not renewed for the 1938–39 school year.

In 1938, Wolpe moved to New York City. In 1945 he became an American citizen and started teaching at the Brooklyn School of Music. He briefly met his daughter in London in 1946. There, during the fifties, he associated with the abstract expressionist painters. He was introduced to them by his third wife, the poet Hilda Morley. From 1952 to 1956 he was director of music at Black Mountain College. Some of his most important compositions were written here, including “Symphony for Twenty Four Instruments” and “Enactments for Three Pianos”.

In 1956, he was appointed to the faculty at the C.W. Post College of Long Island University in Brookville, New York. He also lectured at the summer schools in Darmstadt in Germany. His pupils included Jack Behrens, Herbert Brün, Morton Feldman, David Tudor, Matthew Greenbaum, John Carisi, M. William Karlins, Stan Applebaum, Gil Evans, George Russell, Robert D. Levin, Boyd McDonald, Ralph Shapey, Ursula Mamlok, Netty Simons, and Beatrice Witkin.

His works from this time sometimes used the twelve-tone technique, were sometimes diatonic, were sometimes based on the Arabic scales (such as maqam saba) he had heard in Palestine and sometimes employed some other method of tonal organisation.

In 1971, Wolpe completed his last composition, "Piece for Trumpet and Seven Instruments" for the trumpeter Ronald Anderson. Wolpe developed Parkinson's disease in 1964, and died in New York City in 1972.

== Music ==
Elliott Carter said of Wolpe's music that, "he does everything wrong and it comes out right."
