= Jack Behrens =

Canadian composer (1935–2024)

Jack Behrens (25 March 1935 – 9 December 2024) was a Canadian composer, pianist, and educator of American birth. A member of the Canadian League of Composers and an associate of the Canadian Music Centre, he studied at the Juilliard School (BSc 1958, MSc 1959) and at Harvard University (PhD 1973), where his teachers included William Bergsma, Vincent Persichetti, Peter Mennin, Leon Kirchner, and Roger Sessions. He also studied with Darius Milhaud at the Aspen Music Festival and with John Cage and Stefan Wolpe at the Emma Lake Composers-Artists Workshop in Saskatchewan.

== Life and career ==
Born in Lancaster, Pennsylvania, Behrens was trained at the Juilliard School where he earned a Bachelor of Music in 1958 and a Master of Music in 1959. Among his teachers at Juilliard were William Bergsma, Vincent Persichetti, and Peter Mennin. In the summer of 1962 he studied at the Aspen Music Festival and School with Darius Milhaud and in the summers of 1964–1965 he studied with Stefan Wolpe and John Cage at the Emma Lake Composers-Artists Workshop in Saskatchewan. He later entered the graduate composition program at Harvard University where he earned a Doctor of Philosophy in music composition in 1973. His teachers at Harvard were Leon Kirchner and Roger Sessions.

Before joining the University of Saskatchewan (Regina Campus) in 1962, Behrens held teaching roles at the Juilliard School and the Emma Willard School in Troy, New York. At Regina, he headed the theory department at the affiliated conservatory and played a central role in developing several concert organizations. From 1966 to 1970 he was University Resident in Music at Simon Fraser University’s Centre for Communications and the Arts in Vancouver, and from 1970 to 1976 he taught at California State College at Bakersfield, serving as chair of the Department of Fine Arts from 1973 to 1976. In 1976 he joined the Faculty of Music at the University of Western Ontario, serving as chair of the Department of Music Theory and Composition until 1980 and as dean from 1980 to 1986. Following his retirement from Western, he continued to contribute to Canadian music as Director of Academic Studies at Toronto’s Glenn Gould School, part of the Royal Conservatory of Music.

Behrens married American-born pianist Sonja Behrens (née Sonja Louise Peterson) on 31 August 1962, sharing nearly fifty years of marriage; she predeceased him in 2012. She maintained an active career as a pianist and educator in both the United States and Canada, teaching at Simon Fraser University, California State University, Bakersfield, and for nearly three decades at the University of Western Ontario, later continuing at Mount Allison University in New Brunswick following her retirement. She also maintained an active presence in London, Ontario’s musical community, for years directing the Fridays-at-Noon concert series at the University of Western Ontario, fostering performance and engagement among students, faculty, and guest artists.

Jack Behrens served as Artistic Director of the Trillium Plus Music & Letters series in London, Ontario from 1987 to 2005, an interdisciplinary concert program supported by the Ontario Arts Council and presented at Museum London (then known as the London Regional Art and Historical Museums), with Diana C. Coates as managing director.

Behrens directed three Canadian productions of John Cage’s experimental chance-based theatre work Europera 5, reflecting a long artistic association with Cage that developed over a 25-year friendship. He also performed as pianist in a 1992 studio recording of Europera 5 released by Musicworks magazine; the recording, based on the Canadian premiere production, featured soprano Jane Leibel, tenor Darryl Edwards, and Noel Martin on Victrola, with production by Don Geppert and Jack Richardson.

In 1990, he also gave the Canadian premiere of Cage’s Two² for two pianos with pianist Laurel Karlik Sheehan, a work from Cage’s late “Number Pieces” period.

Among his many compositions, Behrens’s Fantasia on a Fragment (1985) derives its pitch material from an 11 × 15 cm fragment of Mozart’s autograph score for the Rondo for Piano and Orchestra in A major, K. 386 (1782), which had been donated to the Music Library at the University of Western Ontario by Gordon Jeffery, a lawyer, organist, conductor, and major benefactor of music in London and across Canada. The piece was composed for Canadian fortepianist Boyd McDonald, who performed it at a New Music Concerts presentation in Toronto on 27 January 1991 as part of a Mozart birthday celebration program.

Behrens received commissions from Adele Marcus, the Canadian Broadcasting Corporation, the Ontario Arts Council, and Orchestra London among others. In 1965 the Canada Council commissioned his chamber opera The Lay of Thrym (libretto by C.K. Cockburn) as part of their research program on Viking literature, art, and music in Scandinavian countries. The four-scene opera is based on an Icelandic legend and employs atonality and aleatoric and improvisational techniques. The world premiere of the opera was given at Darke Hall on 13 April 1968 under the baton of the composer.

Behrens is the subject of international research by flautist Rebecca Hall, of the University of Malta, and Karin Di Bella of Brock University in Ontario. In January 2019, Di Bella said, "What’s interesting about Jack’s pieces is that even though they’re more modern in style, they’re still really accessible." Behrens died on 9 December 2024, at the age of 89.
