= St. Lawrence String Quartet =

Canadian chamber ensembles

The St. Lawrence String Quartet (SLSQ) is a Canadian string quartet.

== History ==
In 1989, at The Royal Conservatory of Music in Toronto, violinists Geoff Nuttall and Barry Shiffman, violist Lesley Robertson, and cellist Marina Hoover established the quartet. SLSQ has held residencies at the Juilliard School, Yale University, the University of Toronto, the Hartt School, and Stanford University (since 1998). In 1992, the quartet won first prize in the Fourth Banff International String Quartet Competition and the Young Concert Artists International Auditions. They have won a Juno Award and a Preis der deutschen Schallplattenkritik for their EMI recording of Robert Schumann's quartets.

SLSQ has recorded four CDs for EMI (composed of quartets by Pyotr Ilyich Tchaikovsky, Robert Schumann, Dmitri Shostakovich, and Osvaldo Golijov). They have also released two CDs of Joseph Haydn quartets. They have premiered works by John Adams (January 2009), Ezequiel Viñao (December 2009), Osvaldo Golijov, David Bruce (work for clarinet and string quartet, commissioned by Carnegie Hall), Derek Charke, Suzanne Hebert-Tremblay, Brian Current, Elizabeth Raum, and Marcus Goddard. SLSQ have also collaborated with composers R. Murray Schafer (premiere of String Quartet 3, in 1994 and "Four-Forty" in 2002), Jonathan Berger (premiere of "Miracles and Mud" in 2001 and "The Bridal Canopy" in 2008), Christos Hatzis ("Awakenings," May 2005), and Roberto Sierra ("Songs from the Diaspora," February 2007).

Hoover remained as SLSQ cellist until her retirement in 2002. Shiffman was the SLSQ's second violinist until his departure in 2006. Nuttall remained as first violinist until his death in October 2022. The remaining SLSQ members took a hiatus after Nuttall's death, and did not formally replace him in the ensemble.

SLSQ resumed concerts with invited guest artists, and presented performance in their 'St. Lawrence Chamber Music Seminar' series. In April 2024, SLSQ formally announced that they are to disband the ensemble at the close of the 2023-2024 season.

== Current members ==
- Owen Dalby, second violin (2015–present)
- Lesley Robertson, viola (co-founding member, 1989–present)
- Christopher Costanza, cello (2003–present)
- Note: the first violin chair has remained vacant since the death of Geoff Nuttall in October 2022.

== Prior members ==
- Geoff Nuttall, first violin and co-founding member of the quartet (1989–2022)
- Marina Hoover, cello (co-founding member, 1989–2002)
- Scott St. John, second violin (2006–2013)
- Barry Shiffman, second violin (1989–2006)
- Mark Fewer, second violin (2013–2015)
- Alberto Parrini, cello (2002–2003)
