= Peter Hannan (composer) =

Peter Hannan (born 19 March 1953) is a Canadian composer, opera director and recorder player based in British Columbia. Hannan has composed music for the recorder, and is known for his work in the field of electro-acoustics. and sampled music as well as his compositions for modern opera.

== Early life and education ==
Hannan was born in Montreal, Quebec. He studied initially at the University of British Columbia, where he received a Bachelor of Music (BMus) in 1975. He pursued advanced studies in recorder performance at the Guildhall School of Music and Drama, London, who awarded him a Certificate of Advanced Studies in 1978. In 1979–80 he studied recorder with Kees Boeke at the Sweelink Conservatory under a Netherlands Government Scholarship.

== Career ==
Hannan taught music at the University of British Columbia, Simon Fraser University, and at Vancouver Community College. In 1986 he performed and recorded with a baroque ensemble on the album Baroque sonatas and canzonas for recorder, harpsichord, and gamba, published the Canadian Broadcasting Corporation.

Hannan began composing music for recorder; many of these compositions were written for his own use as a performer, and included real-time performance using electronic MIDI instruments, and especially the MIDI wind controller. His tunes include strong rhythms, showing the influence of the "New Hague" school of Dutch minimalism, and in particular of composer Louis Andriessen.

Hanna began composing music for modern opera, and in 1997 created an operatic work The Gang, which included a libretto by Tom Cone. In 2002, he collaborated with Peter Hinton on the opera 120 Songs for the Marquis de Sade, which premiered in Vancouver. In 2003, he collaborated with Hinton on a short opera The Dianna Cantata.

Hannan performed Christos Hatzis' composition Nadir, which combines live music with recorded tracks, as was commissioned for him by the Canadian Electronic Ensemble.

In 2013 his work 120 Songs for the Marquis de Sade was staged at the Vancouver Playhouse.

== Recordings ==
His Generic Music, on which his recorder playing accompanies the harpsichord of Colin Tilney, was included on the 1995 CD "Regarding Starlight" (CBC Records, MVCD 1055). On the same release, he accompanied viola player Douglas Perr on a performance of Christos Hatzis' Nadir.

In 2011 four of Hannan's compositions were recorded by Musica Intima and the Vancouver Cantata Singers and released on the Artifact Music label as the album Rethink Forever.
