= Joseph Petric =

Canadian musical artist (born 1952)

Joseph Francis Petric BM, MA
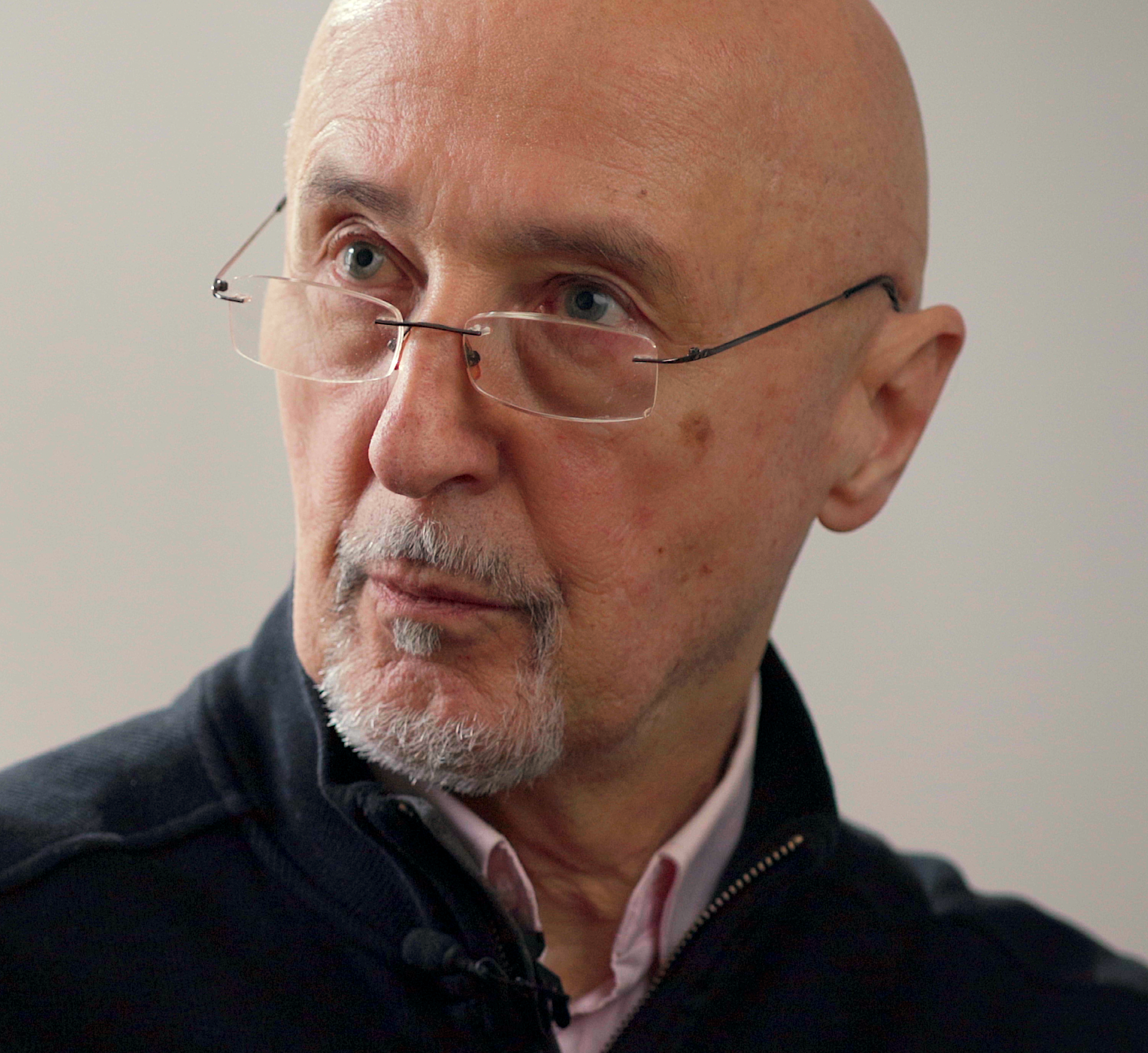
- Petric in 2022

Background information
- Born: October 8, 1952 (age 74); Guelph, Ontario, Canada
- Occupations: Concert accordionist, musicologist, composer, author, teacher
- Instrument: Accordion
- Years active: 1979–present
- Website: josephpetric.com

Joseph Francis Petric (born October 8, 1952) is a Canadian concert accordionist, musicologist, composer, author, and pedagogue.

== Formation ==
After beginning accordion lessons at the age of five, Petric began private studies at Toronto's Royal Conservatory when he was 17. He was then accepted to Queen's University where he studied accordion with Joseph Macerollo; this was followed by studies in musicology with Rika Maniates at the University of Toronto. Petric continued performance studies with various instructors including Hugo Noth at the Staatliche Hochschule für Musik Trossingen, Renaissance specialist Leslie Huggett (1992–8), harpsichordist Colin Tilney (1997–2010), and forte-pianist Boyd McDonald (2009–15).

== Repertoire ==
Petric is known for the impressive number of works he has introduced to the accordion repertoire. The performer's website presently states that he has commissioned over 360 pieces including 31 electroacoustic works and 21 concerti.

=== Electroacoustic works ===
Although the electroacoustic genre was initially most prevalent in avant garde circles, these works were welcomed enthusiastically in programs Petric has presented to general audiences. These compositions include digital and computer stochastic programming, live digital delay systems, electroacoustic CD playback, interactive software, sound processing, techno-chamber, live computer systems, and MAC patch software. Alexa Woloshyn's recent publication An Orchestra at My Fingertips: A History of the Canadian Electronic Ensemble mentions Petric multiple times for his involvement in the pioneering Canadian Ensemble, his collaborations with composer David Jaeger, and his recordings for the Canadian Music Centre's record label Centrediscs.

=== Concerti ===
Petric has a concerto-led career that is sustained by commissioning new works from emerging and established composers. The 30 concerto performances Petric gave across North America and Europe between 1995 and 1997 speaks to the importance of these commissioned works in the musician's career. These commissions include concerti by composers like Peter Paul Koprowski (1994), Omar Daniel (1998), Denis Gougeon (2004), James Rolfe (2005), and Brian Current (2008), among many others. On 8 October 2010, Petric performed three concertos in one night in a concert featuring works by Gougeon, Current, and Piazzolla performed by the Victoria Symphony and Maestra Tania Miller.

== Performing arts ==
Petric's performance career began within the traditional conservatory contexts of the accordion, but by the early 1980s it was clear that his performances were becoming increasingly post-colonial. Petric expresses this post-colonial vision in the concert hall with performances that include free improvisation, comprovisation, electroacousticism, multi-media, theatrical performance, techno-chamber (with computer and software), Baroque- and Classical-era rhetoric, and the post-modern concerto. This holistic approach to performance has been received well among audiences and critics; Peter Reed's review of Die Winterreise with Pentaèdre and Prégardien at Wigmore Hall in 2019 praises Petric's "extraordinary grasp of [the accordion's] ability to sound like 'breath from another planet'”. Similarly, Petric and Pauline Oliveros’ microtonal improvising accordion duo, Deep Squeeze (1986–96), is significant for extending Oliveros’ Deep Listening philosophy into the concert hall to explore music and spirituality.

=== Touring ===
Petric has been represented by several international management agencies concurrently throughout his career, which has allowed him to develop a strong international touring presence. His appearances include return engagements with Musique Royale, Debut Atlantic, Debut Atlantic Encore, Prairie Debut, John Lewis Partnership (UK), Jeunesses Musicales, Columbia Artists Community Concerts, and Sweden's Reikskonzerter.

Petric's 1986 American debut at Washington's Kennedy Center included R. Murray Schafer's La Testa d’Ariadne and his European debut followed in 1992 at St. John's, Smiths Square (London). These performances generated strong interest in Petric leading to performances at venues like the Institut de recherche et coordination acoustique / musique (IRCAM), Tanglewood Music Festival, Kennedy Center, The Berlin Philharmonic Chamber Music Hall, Disney Centre, Israeli Opera at Tel Aviv, Jerusalem Festival, and Tokyo Spring. In 2009 he began a series of intercontinental tours with the wind quintet Pentaèdre and tenor Christoph Prégardien in Norman Forget's chamber adaptation of Schubert's Die Winterreise. These performances brought the ensemble to Wigmore Hall, Tokyo Bunkai Kaikan, and The Berlin Philharmonic.

In Canada, Petric has performed at Roy Thomson Hall with the Toronto Symphony Orchestra, The Music Gallery, Nouvel Ensemble Moderne, Ottawa Chamber Music Festival, Winnipeg New Music Festival, and Newfoundland Sound Symposium, among many other venues and festivals. Engagements at international festivals include those with Huddersfield Contemporary Music Festival, De Yjsbrekker, Vienna Haus der Musik, Siljan Festival, Hohenems Schubertiade, and Belfast Festival. Petric remains a sought-after guest for international masterclasses and lectures across North America, the United Kingdom, and Europe.

=== Discography ===
For details on Petric's audio recordings, see Main Article: Joseph Petric Discography.

== Research ==
=== Musicology ===
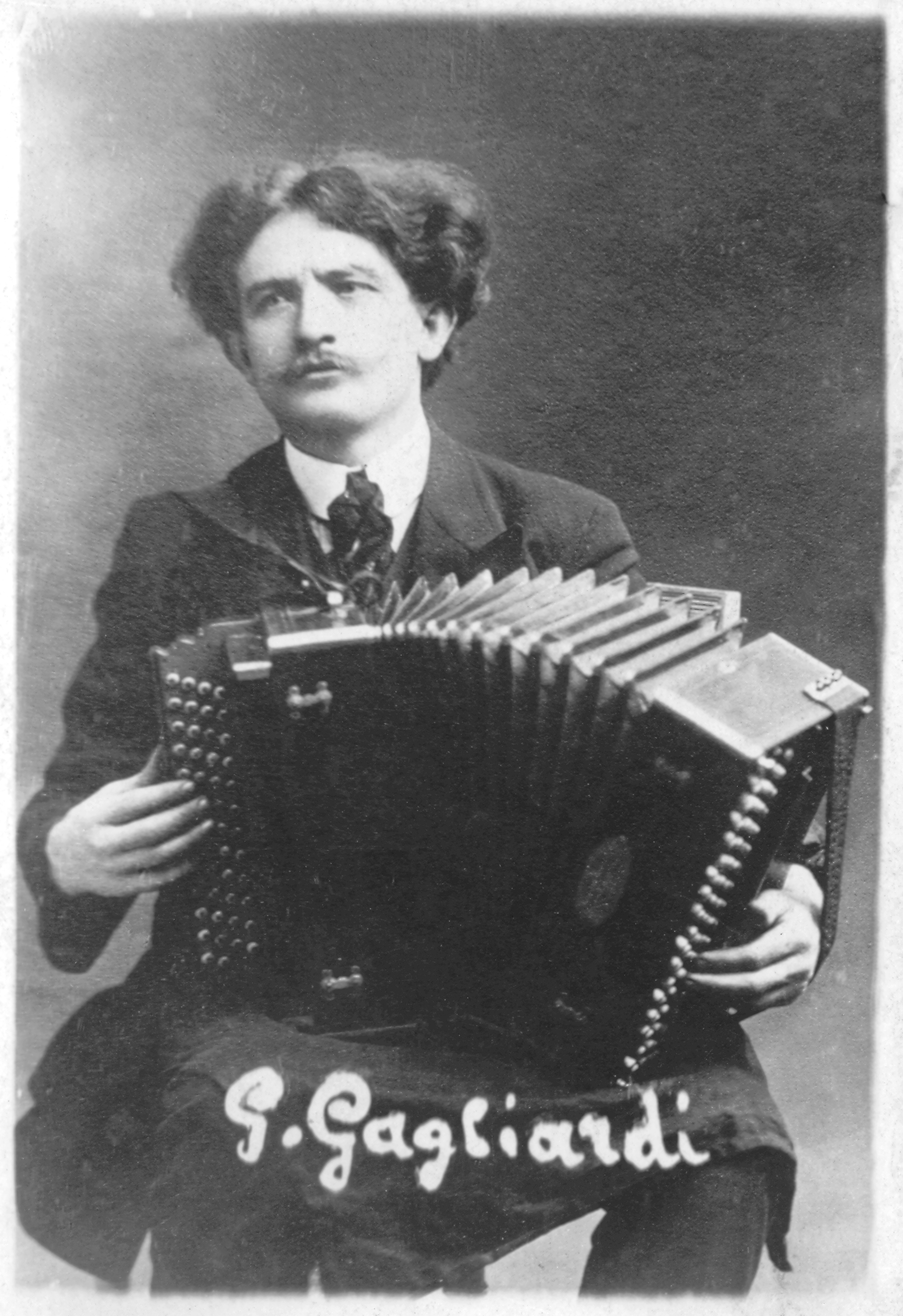
Giovanni Gagliardi (1908)

Petric is sought internationally for private mentoring and is Visiting Professor at the Université de Montréal, where he leads the graduate accordion performance program. The academic dimension of his practice includes treatises such as Giuseppe Tartini's The Art of Ornamentation (1759) and Adolf Beyschlag's Die Ornamentik (1904), recent and historical scholarly publications, and Petric's own writing. Petric's 2017 monograph The Concert Accordion: Contemporary Perspectives, for example, combines musicological, historical, and interpretive approaches that are fundamental for developing “a living art”. In this volume, Petric re-introduces Giovanni Gagliardi's treatise Le Petit Manual de L'Accordéoniste (Paris, 1911; reprint by Augemus, 2004) to a wider readership and notes Gagliardi's unique approach to fingering and ‘circular bowing’ on the accordion. Petric also draws attention to the significance of instrument design by codifying 14 concert instrument patents filed by Italian builders near Milan, Catania, Croce St. Spirito, Paris, Geneva, Bolzano, Philadelphia, New York City, and Chicago between 1890 and 1930.

Petric's accordion is a practical application of his interests in historical design and recent acoustic research, which were combined to create an instrument suited to performing in concert halls. This bespoke instrument was designed and built in collaboration with Canadian builder Leo Niemi and uses unique reed blocks that deliver heightened reed response and sound projection in symphonic concerti. The design also relies on violin-like sound posts for enhanced resonance and a silicone-shellac finish created after researching the shellacs used on Stradivarius’ violins. These features of Petric's accordion make it the ideal instrument for a career focused on concertizing.

=== Publications ===
- The Holistic Accordion, a Manifesto: Fresh Perspectives of an Interpretive Art (Augemus, 2022)
- The Concert Accordion: Contemporary Perspectives (Augemus, 2017)
- Accordion Dialogues and the Poetics of an Interpretive Art (Augemus, 2025)

== Collaborations ==
=== Set ensembles ===
- 2011, Trio Diomira: inclusive trio influenced by Persian, jazz, contemporary, and European classical traditions and texts, works by Dinuk Wijaratne
- 2009, Duo Contempera: accordion and cello duo with David Hetherington
- 2004–Present, Pentaèdre - Winterreise Project: Schubert's Winterreise adapted for wind quintet by N. Forget; performances with Christoph Prégardien
- 2002–Present, Petric / Carpentier Duo: accordion and clarinet duo, contemporary works with Martin Carpentier
- 2002–11, Petric / Forget Duo: accordion and oboe, works ancient and new
- 1999–Present, Bellows and Brass: trio for accordion, trombonist Alain Trudel, and triple instrumentalist and actor Guy Few; commissioned works, theatrical creations, multi-media works, live video and interactive electronics, new and ancient music
- 1994–Present, Erosonic: accordion and baritone saxophone (David Mott); performing notated, improvised, and electroacoustic works with staging, lighting, and movement
- 1994–Present, Petric / Penderecki Quartet: commissions, collaborations; recordings with staging, electronics, and narrations
- 1986–2002, Petric / Cross Duo: London-based accordion and clarinet duo with British clarinettist Fiona Cross
- 1986–96, Deep Listening: An improvisational microtonal accordion duo with Joseph Petric and Pauline Oliveros. The duo's name comes from Oliveros’ Deep Listening philosophy and her work with the Deep Listening Band. Because of her unified approach to music and philosophy, Oliveros is widely considered to be a musical and spiritual heir to John Cage, even though she began developing her philosophy before hearing Cage's watershed piece 4’33”. Notable performances include their program at Bowling Green State University's 14th New Music and Art Festival, “Art and Spirituality” (1993).^{,}^{,} Archival materials on Petric and Oliveros’ work together can be found at the New York Public Library and the University of California.

=== Artistic direction ===
- 2013, Berio's Sequenza: co-director with David Hetherington, first complete Canadian staging of Luciano Berio's Sequenza collection with original narrations of Sanguinetti's poetry and full staging; performed at University of Toronto New Music Festival
- 2010, Accordion on Fire: concerti by Current, Gougeon, and Piazzolla performed in a single concert with Tania Miller and the Victoria Symphony
- 1994, CBC Virtuosi Series: hosted new music program, Two New Hours, featuring contemporary Canadian composers and virtuosi at Glenn Gould Theatre (Toronto)
- 1991, The Big Squeeze Accordion Festival: artistic co-director

=== String ensembles ===
Composers Andrew Paul MacDonald (Quebec), Adrian Williams (UK), Yannick Plammondon (Quebec), and Éric Morin (Quebec) have had works premiered by Petric in collaboration with the Vanbrugh (Ireland) and Penderecki (Canada) Quartets. These premieres include strictly acoustic, electroacoustic, and theatrical works. Petric has also given premieres of works by Marjan Mozetich and Raymond Luedeke with the Amadeus and Adaskin Trios. Petric's string ensemble collaborators include:

- 2011, Silver Birch Quartet (Canada)
- 2008–10, Quatour St. Germaine (Québec)
- 2000–06, Adaskin String Trio (Canada)
- 1996–99, Alcan Quartet (Québec)
- 1996–98, Arriaga Quartet (Belgium)
- 1994–Present, Penderecki Quartet (Canada)
- 1994–2000, RTÉ Vanbrugh Quartet (Ireland)
- 1992–94, Duke Quartet (England)

=== Music and spoken word ===
- David Cameron, Femke (2023): Petric's collaboration with Scottish poet and author David Cameron uses a performance of David Jaeger and Petric's composition Spirit Cloud as an accompanying musical texture to Cameron's narration of his novel, Femke, which is described as “an immersive psychological study and literary mystery”
- Linda Bouchard, Murderous Little World (2004): a multimedia theatrical work for three musicians doubling as actors and narrators based on poet Anne Carson's collection of poetry and prose Men in the Off Hours (2000); performed by Joseph Petric, Guy Few (trumpet and piano), and Eric Vaillancourt (trombone)

== Accomplishments ==
=== Awards ===
- 2013, UNESCO International Music Council & Confédération internationale des accordéonistes - Merit Award: for contributions to international accordion art; presented in Victoria, British Columbia
- 2008, Prix Opus Record of the Year - Classical, Romantic, Post-Romantic, Impressionist: For Winterreise recording with Pentaèdre and Prégardien
- 2009, Canadian Music Centre - Ambassador of Canadian Music: for contributions to Canadian music, in celebration of CMC's 50th anniversary
- 2006, Canadian Music Centre - Friend of Music Award: for contributions to Canadian music
- 1992, BBC Radio3 Auditions - Laureate: First accordionist laureate at BBC, London
- 1980, CBC National Radio Auditions, Laureate

=== Nominations ===
- 2005, Prix Opus
- 2003, Ontario Arts Council - Hunter Prize for Best Recording
- 2002, JUNO - Best Composition: for album Orbiting Garden

=== Funding ===
Petric's work has garnered support from Koussevitsky Foundation (New York City), Canada Council for the Arts, Ontario Arts Council, QALC (Quebec Society of Arts and Letters), CBC Radio, Reikskonzerter (Sweden), Laidlaw Foundation (Toronto), and John Lewis Partnership (UK).
