= Christos Hatzis =

Greek-Canadian composer

- Born: 21 March 1953 (age 73); Volos, Greece
- Occupation: Composer
- Website: https://christoshatzis.com

Christos Hatzis (Greek: Χρήστος Χατζής; born 1953) is a Juno Award-winning Greek-Canadian composer. Many of his compositions are performed internationally, and he is a professor at the Faculty of Music, University of Toronto.

== Early life and education ==
Hatzis was born in Volos, Greece, and received his early music instruction at the Volos branch of the Hellenic Conservatory. He continued his musical studies in the United States, first at the Eastman School of Music (B.M 1976 and M.M 1977) and later at the State University of New York (SUNY) at Buffalo (PhD 1982). His composition teachers include Morton Feldman, Lejaren Hiller, Wlodzimierz Kotonski, Samuel Adler, Russell Peck, Joseph Schwantner and Warren Benson.

== Career ==
Hatzis immigrated to Canada in 1982 and became a Canadian citizen in 1985. He composed music related to Christian spirituality, particularly his Byzantine heritage, and the Canadian Inuit culture. In addition to composing and teaching, Hatzis has written extensively about composition and contemporary music.

He won the Jules Léger Prize for New Chamber Music in 1996.

In 1998, Hatzis received the Jean A. Chalmers National Music Award. He won two Juno Awards in 2006, including Best Classical Composition for String Quartet No. I (The Awakening), which was recorded by the St. Lawrence String Quartet.

Hatzis won another Juno in 2008 for his work Constantinople; it combined music and visual media and is musically eclectic, featuring jazz, classical, and eastern elements. The work was performed at halls at Banff and Toronto during the summer and fall of 2004, to critical acclaim from the Toronto Star and the Calgary Herald. Constantinople has been performed internationally.

His projects include a commission from violinist Hilary Hahn, a piece for bass clarinet, string orchestra and audio playback commissioned by Jeff Reilly, and a new work based on poems by Elizabeth Bishop, commissioned by soprano Suzie Leblanc and Symphony Nova Scotia. On 12 November 2010, Hatzis' piece Credo was performed by George Dalaras, a popular Greek singer, and CityMusic Cleveland Orchestra in Avery Fisher Hall in New York. He also composed a piece for the CBC as part of a multinational Millenium Project.

Hatzis composed the score for the Royal Winnipeg Ballet production Going Home Star; the two-CD recording by the Winnipeg Symphony won a Juno Award in 2017.

He is a member of the Canadian Music Centre. His works are published by Promethean Editions.

== Compositions ==
=== Orchestra ===
- Credo (2010)
- Redemption: Book 1 (2009)
- Mirage? (2009)
- Tongues of Fire (2007)
- Rebirth (2006)
- Telluric Dances (2005)
- Christos Anesti (2004)
- Sepulcher of Life (2004)
- K 627: Concerto for Piano and Orchestra in F Major in the Spirit of W. A. Mozart (2003)
- Light from the Cross (2002)
- Pyrrichean Dances (2001)
- From the Book of Job (2001)
- Farewell to Bach (1998)
- Confessional (1997)
- Zeitgeist, (1996)
- Concerto for Flute and Chamber Orchestra (1993)
- The Gouldberg Variations, 1992
- Mortiferum Fel, (1985–1990)
- Omen, (1985)

=== Choral ===
- Mysterion Xenon (2012)
- Psalm 91 (2008)
- From the Song of Songs (2008)
- WATER (2008)
- Easter Kontakion (2007)
- Wormwood (2005)
- Four Rituals for Percussion Quintet, Choir and Audience (2004)
- The Troparion of Kassiani (2004)
- Sepulcher of Life (2004)
- LIGHT (Arctic Dreams 2) (2003)
- Everlasting Light (1999)
- De Angelis (1999)
- Kyrie (1997)
- Heirmos (1994)

=== Chamber ===
- Symbol of Faith (2009)
- Coming To (2009) – For Hillary Hahn
- Dystopia (2009) – For Hillary Hahn
- Anaktoria (1990 rev. 2009)
- Arabesque (2009)
- Afterthoughts 2 (2007)
- Lazy Afternoons by the Lake (2007)
- Mystical Visitations (2006)
- Through a Glass Darkly (2005)
- Cruel Elegance (2004) – For the St. Lawrence Quartet
- Four Rituals for Percussion Quintet, Choir and Audience (2004) – For NEXUS
- Parlor Music (2004) – For Beverley Johnston and the Amici Trio
- Afterthoughts 1 (2002)
- Constantinople (2000) – For the Gryphon Trio
- String Quartet No. 2 (The Gathering) (1999) – For the St. Lawrence Quartet
- Melisma (1995) – Commissioned by Jean-Guy Boisvert
- Three Songs on poems by Sappho (1993)
- Burial Ground (In Memoriam: Chari Polatos) (1993) – Commissioned by the Fifth Species woodwind quintet
- Erotikos Logos (1991)
- Stylus (1990) – Commissioned by Peter Hannan, Douglas Perry and Joseph Petric
- On Cerebral Dominance (1987)
- Arcana (1983) – Commissioned by Arraymusic

=== Mixed media ===
- In the Fire of Conflict (2008)
- LIGHT (Arctic Dreams 2) (2003)
- Arctic Dreams 1 (2002)
- Constantinople (2000)
- Fertility Rites (1997) – Commissioned by Beverley Johnston
- Tetragrammaton (1995) – Commissioned by Anne-Marie Donovan
- String Quartet No. 1 (The Awakening) (1994) – Commissioned by the Smith Quartet
- Of Threads and Labyrinths (1994) – Commissioned by Soundstreams Canada for Lawrence Cherney and Erica Goodman
- From the Vanishing Gardens of Eden (1992) – Commissioned by CBC Radio
- Byzantium (1991) – for oboe and electronics – Commissioned by the Shobana Jeyasingh Dance Company
- The Birth of Venus (1990) – Commissioned by Robert Black
- The Mega4 Meta4 (1990) – Douglas Perry
- Pavillons En l' Air (1989) – Commissioned by CBC Radio for Scott Irvine and Beverley Johnston
- Orbiting Garden (1989) – Commissioned by The Music Gallery for Anthony de Mare
- Orbiting Garden (1991) – Commissioned by the Laidlaw Foundation accordion version for Joseph Petric
- Crucifix (1988)
- Nadir (1988) – Commissioned by the Canadian Electronic Ensemble for Peter Hannan and Rivka Golani
- Equivoque (1985) – Commissioned by Joseph Petric

=== Radiophonic ===
- Viderunt Omnes (1998)
- Footprints in New Snow (1996)
- The Idea of Canada (1992)
- The Temptation of St. Anthony (1987)
