= Sherman Friedland =

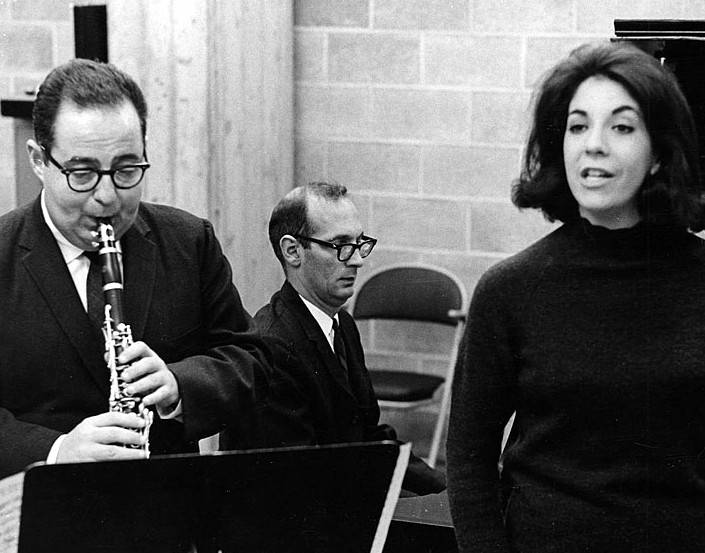
- Sherman Friedland in rehearsal

Background information
- Born: July 9, 1933; New York City, U.S.
- Died: January 26, 2017 (aged 83) Cornwall, Ontario, U.S.
- Instrument: Clarinet
- Website: www.clarinetcorner.wordpress.com

Sherman Friedland (July 9, 1933 – January 26, 2017) was a Canadian clarinetist and conductor. He was Associate Professor of Fine Arts, as well as a professor of music and conductor at Concordia University in Montreal from 1960 until his retirement in 1997. He was also conductor and Music Director of the Concordia University Symphony for 17 years, and was clarinetist, director and founder of the Concordia Chamber Players.

== Life and career ==
Sherman Friedland was born in Brooklyn, New York on July 9, 1933. He attended Brookline High School from 1947 to 1951. After serving as a bandsman in the U.S. Army, he attended Boston University, studying with Gino Cioffi at the New England Conservatory of Music, as well as with Rosario Mazzeo. He graduated in 1960 with a Bachelor of Music degree.

He was appointed Principal Clarinetist of the Milwaukee Symphony in 1961 and studied at Le Conservatoire Americain. He studied with Marcel Jean in Paris, and studied chamber music with Mademoiselle Nadia Boulanger. He was awarded the Diplome cum Laudes in Clarinet by Mlle. Boulanger in 1960. He organized the Milwaukee Symphony Wind Quintet, which served as Quintet in Residence at Fontainbleau during the summer of 1963.

At the University of Massachusetts Amherst, he earned a Master of Music and was appointed Fromm Fellow at the Berkshire Music Center in 1964, where he performed as soloist in the Concerto for Clarinet and Orchestra by Easley Blackwood, conducted by Gunther Schuller, and he also performed the final concert of Aaron Copland's tenure at the Center in Copland's As it Fell Upon a Day and in the Copland Sextet for Clarinet and String Quartet and Piano, which Copland coached.

In 1962, he won second prize in the National Competition for Woodwind Instruments, sponsored by the Musicians Club of New York.

In 1965, he was appointed as Creative Associate at the Center for Creative and Performing Arts at the State University of New York at Buffalo, Lukas and Foss, directors, under a grant from the Rockefeller Foundation. The group, which included Paul Zukofsky, Buell Neidlinger, John Bergamo and Carol Plantamura, focused on avant-garde music and performance, performing regularly in Buffalo and in New York's Carnegie Recital Hall.

Friedland was Professor of Music at Plymouth State College of the University of New Hampshire in 1968-69, and he served as Assistant Professor at Fort Lewis College in Durango, Colorado from 1969 until 1976. In 1976 he became Associate Professor of Fine Arts at Concordia University in Montreal, where he taught Clarinet and Chamber Music, and was conductor of the Concordia University Symphony Orchestra until 1993. Friedland organized, and was clarinetist and director, for the Concordia Chamber Players. His concerts as clarinetist have been reviewed by The New York Times among other publications.

He appeared as clarinetist in over 85 concerts of chamber music for Radio Canada. He also appeared in Musicien Québécois.

The Canadian composer Jean Coulthard of Vancouver composed Gardens for Mr. Friedland and Dale Bartlett, pianist. John Bavicchi, professor at Berklee College of Music in Boston, Massachusetts, composed his Sonata for Clarinet and Piano for Friedland, which was first performed at Titusville, Florida.

Friedland recorded four compact discs for SNE Records of Montreal: The Concordia Commissions: Music, When Soft Voices Die, Vibrates in the Memory (SNE 614), Sherman Friedland in Concert (SNE 618), The Dream Itself Enchanted Me (SNE 538), and a release including the John Bavicchi's Clarinet Quintet.

Friedland resided in Cornwall, Ontario with his wife of 50 years, Linda. They had four children: Noah, Abram, and twins Nathan and Joseph. He died in Cornwall on January 26, 2017, at the age of 83.

== Publications ==
Friedland ran a blog, https://web.archive.org/web/20080421215306/http://clarinet.cc/ from January 2004, answering clarinet-related questions. He has written seven hundred articles, receiving material for response from clarinetists. He wrote many articles on clarinet repertoire, instrumental problems and various aspects of the musical experience.
