= Katharina Wolpe =

British pianist (1931–2013)

- Born: 9 September 1931; Grinzing
- Died: 9 February 2013 (aged 81); Hampstead, England
- Occupation: Pianist
- Parent(s): Stefan Wolpe (father), Ola Okuniewska (mother)

Katharina Petra Wolpe (9 September 1931 – 9 February 2013) was an Austrian-born British pianist. Her repertoire included Austrian and German composers, in particular Schumann, Brahms, Arnold Schoenberg and Stefan Wolpe (her father).

== Life ==
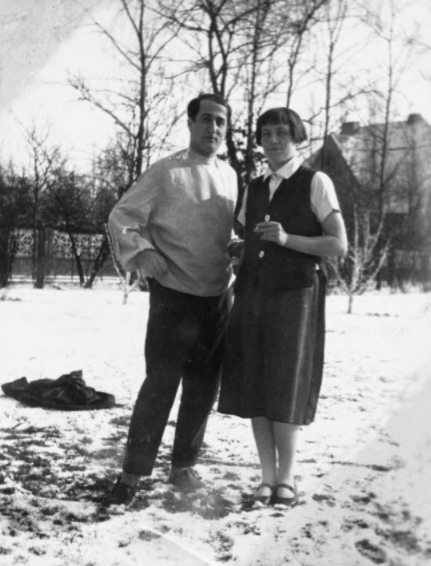
Katherina Wolpe's parents, Stefan and Ola, in 1927

Wolpe was born in Grinzing, Vienna in 1931. Her parents were both Jews. They had married in 1927 but by the time Katharina was born, they were living separately. Her father Stefan Wolpe was a composer, and her mother Ola (née Okuniewska) was a painter born in Czechoslovakia.

With the Anschluss in 1938, she and her mother escaped to Serbia. Her father was long gone, having left for Palestine when Katharina was young. Her mother left her in Switzerland while she went to England to become an art teacher to make a living. Katharina found herself a de facto orphan in Berne during the war. By the time she arrived in London she was sixteen and a skilled pianist. She gave her first concert soon after her arrival.

Her repertoire included Austrian and German composers like Haydn, Mozart, Schoenberg and Beethoven but in particular Schumann and Brahms. In 1951 her father wrote "Form for Piano," which he dedicated to his daughter.

In 1991 she spent many hours recording all the music composed by Arnold Schoenberg. In 1997 she recorded works by her father including "Piece of Embittered Music" from his Zemach Suite (1939), "Studies, Part 1" (1944–51) and "Form for Piano." The video recording, called "Thinking Twice" after a series of lectures Stefan Wolpe had given, was directed by British filmmaker Jayne Parker.

Katharina's mother, Ola, was a student of Bauhaus-affiliated artist, Johannes Itten. She taught art and was a lifelong artist; she was religious and modest and never exhibited her work in secular settings. Ola's work was often linked to music; the house she and her daughter shared was full of music as Katharina rehearsed or taught music students. There she would teach pianists and her mother taught painters.

Wolpe died in Hampstead in 2013.
