= Matthew Greenbaum =

American musician, composer and author

Matthew Jonathan Greenbaum (born February 12, 1950) is an American musician, composer and author.

== Background ==
Born in New York City, Greenbaum studied privately with Stefan Wolpe, and Mario Davidovsky at the Graduate Center of the City University of New York. He holds a Ph.D. in composition from the Graduate Center (1985), and has served as a professor of music composition at Temple University's Boyer College of Music and Dance since 1998.

Since 1999 Greenbaum has worked with computer animation to create hybrid works of visual music, as well as chamber music with a video component. Greenbaum has also written on Claude Debussy, Arnold Schoenberg and Edgard Varèse in relation to Wolpe's dialectical and "cubist" approach to musical structure. He is the curator of Amphibian, a new music and video series in the Hi Art Gallery in New York City.

== Music ==
Greenbaum's most significant work is Nameless, a 25-minute wordless psalm for three sopranos and two chamber ensembles. It was composed for the Momenta Quartet and the Cygnus Ensemble, and bears a quotation from the Medieval Jewish philosopher Moses Maimonides.

== Awards ==
Greenbaum's awards include the following:

- Mary Flagler Charitable Trust Award Recording Award, 2008
- Es ist zum Lachen: Commission, Serge Koussevitzky Fund/Library of Congress for Ensemble Surplus (Freiburg), 2007
- Academy Awards: American Academy of Arts and Letters, 2005
- Crossing Brooklyn Ferry: Fromm Music Foundation commission 1994
- Amulet for piano, commissioned by Meet the Composer/Reader's Digest Commission for a consortium of pianists (Gilbert Kalish, Marc-André Hamelin, David Holzman, Randall Hodgkinson, Kathleen Supové and Anthony De Mare) and WGBH-Boston 1989
- Fellowship, New York Foundation for the Arts, 1986
- John Simon Guggenheim Foundation award, 1984
- Chamber Music: Martha Baird Rockefeller Fund for Recordings, 1982

== Selected works ==
=== Solo instrument ===
- Double Song for viola sola: In memoriam Milton Babbitt (2011)
- Chaconne by Attrition for solo violin (2006)
- You Crack Me Up for piano solo (2012)
- Ballate for solo piano (2005)
- Mute Dance for solo guitar (2000)
- Elegy for solo piano (1998)
- Amulet for solo piano (1990)

=== Solo instrument with piano ===
- Untimely Observations for viola and piano (2002)
- Dance Moments for flute/violin and piano (2000)
- Nod Quiet Ox for oboe and piano (1994)
- On the river the shadowy group for baritone sax and piano (1993)

=== Chamber music ===
- More Venerable Canons for string quartet (2014)
- Venerable Canons for flute and violin (2007)
- Es ist zum Lachen for oboe, trombone, violin, cello, percussion and piano (2008) (commissioned by Ensemble Surplus and the Serge Koussevitzky Fund/Library of Congress
- Castelnau for string quartet (2002)
- Enharmonicon for clarinet trumpet and violin (1994)

=== Chamber music with voice ===
- Entretiens sur la pluralité des mondes for soprano and two guitars (2014)
- West-Östicher Divan (2010) for soprano and 2 guitars (2010)
- Wild Rose, Lily, Dry Vanilla for soprano, flute, oboe, violin, cello, guitar and banjo (2004)
- Psalter for mezzo, alto flute, English horn, string trio harp and piano (1992)

=== Orchestral music ===
- The Jig is Up for oboe and string orchestra (2009)
- Nameless for three sopranos, alto flute, English horn, violin, cello guitar and mandolin and string quartet (2009)
- Spherical Music for piano and chamber orchestra (1995)

=== Theater works ===
- A Floating Island, chamber opera for soprano, saxophone, harpsichord, percussion and dancers (2000)

=== Visual music (video animation and electronic sound) ===
- I saw the Procession of the Empress on First Avenue (2014)
- Automat (2012)
- Headshot (2012)
- 23 Skidoo (2011)
- On Broadway (2008)

=== With instruments/voice ===
- Leviathan for trombone and video animation (2016)
- Effacement for piano and video animation (2014)
- Bits and Pieces for saxophone and video animation (2012)
- Rope and Chasm for mezzo-soprano and video animation (2010–13)

=== Recordings ===
- Double Song for viola sola, a contribution to Perspectives of New Music's memorial to Milton Babbitt, Spring 2012
- Nameless and other Works: Furious Artisans Recordings; The Cygnus Ensemble and the Momenta Quartet, with sopranos Priscilla Herreid, Elizabeth Farnum and Julie Bishop, mezzo-soprano Re'ut Ben Ze'ev, and violinist Miranda Cuckson
  - Nameless for three sopranos, alto flute, English horn, violin, cello guitar and mandolin and string quartet (2009)
  - Wild Rose, Lily, Dry Vanilla for mezzo-soprano, flute, oboe, violin, cello, guitar and banjo
  - Chaconne by Attrition for violin alone
  - Venerable Canons for flute and violin
- Psalter and other works, Centaur #2789
  - Psalter, Joyce Castle/Parnassus
  - Prospect Retrospect for cello and piano: Fred Sherry/Blair McMillen
  - from A Floating Island: Cyndie Bellen-Berthézène
  - Castelnau for string quartet: The Momenta Quartet
  - Elegy: David Holzman, piano
  - Untimely Observations for viola and piano: Stephanie Griffin/Blair McMillen
- Nod Quiet Ox for oboe and piano: Fabian Menzel and Bernhard Endres. Antes/Bella Musica
- Amulet, for piano solo: David Holzman, Centaur CRC 2291
- Chamber Music, for flute, cello and piano: The Contemporary Trio re-release. New World NWCRL513

== Articles ==
Greenbaum is the author of the following articles:

- "Dialectic in Miniature: Schoenberg's 'Sechs Kleine Klavierstücke Op. 19.'" Ex Tempore (Summer 2010)
- "Surrealism in New York." New Music Jukebox (American Music Center) (Fall 2009)
- "Debussy, Wolpe and Dialectical Form." Contemporary Music Review: Stefan Wolpe Issue (Spring 2008)
- "The Proportions of Density 21.5: Wolpean Symmetries in the Music of Edgard Varèse", On the Music of Stefan Wolpe. Austin Clarkson, ed. Pendragon (Hillsdale, New York: 2003)
- "Stefan Wolpe's Dialectical Logic: A Look at the 'Second Piece for Violin Alone'", Perspectives of New Music, volume 40, number 2 (2002)
- Stefan Wolpe, "On Proportions" trans. Matthew Greenbaum. Perspectives of New Music 34/2 (1996)
