= Ursula Mamlok =

American composer

Ursula Mamlok

Ursula Mamlok (née Meyer; February 1, 1923 – May 4, 2016) was a German-born American composer and teacher. Mamlok was born into a Jewish family in Berlin, Germany, but fled to Guayaquil, Ecuador, in 1938 after Kristallnacht. In the United States, she became a well-regarded teacher of composition.

== Education and influences ==
Beginning at age 12, and before emigrating from Nazi Germany, Mamlok studied piano and composition with Professor Gustav Ernest and Emily Weissgerber.

Ursula emigrated alone to New York City in 1940 to attend the Mannes School of Music, which had offered her full scholarship on the basis of one of her compositions. Her mother and stepfather, Hans Lewy, followed in 1941. She became an American citizen in 1945.

During her four years at the Mannes School, Mamlok studied under the direction of George Szell. In the summer of 1944, she applied for a three-month fellowship through Black Mountain College in North Carolina. Here, through a masterclass led by Ernst Krenek, she encountered the serialist music of Arnold Schoenberg, who would prove to be a significant influence in her composition.

Mamlok received a bachelor's and master's degree at the Manhattan School of Music in the 1950s, studying with Vittorio Giannini. Other teachers include Roger Sessions and Ralph Shapey in composition and Eduard Steuermann, one of the foremost piano pedagogues at the time, in performance.

Though Hindemith was one of her earliest influences, Mamlok credited the works of serial composers, including Schoenberg, Berg and Webern, as having the greatest impact on her compositional style. She also said: "My music is colorful, with the background of tonality – tonal centers … I can't shake it completely."

== Compositions ==
Mamlok composed extensively for small chamber ensembles of various configurations as well as works for piano. However, her output included a few pieces for orchestra, including a concerto for oboe. Other works included several songs, as well as works for voice and chamber ensemble. Mamlok's husband, Dwight Mamlok, wrote the text for her 1987 song cycle "Der Andreasgarten".

Of her own compositional style and pieces she said:

My main concern is that the music should convey the various emotions in it with clarity and conviction. It interests me to accomplish this with a minimum of material, transforming it in such multiple way so as to give the impression of ever-new ideas that are like the flowers of a plant, all related yet each one different.

== Career and awards ==
Also an influential teacher, Mamlok held many university positions including placements at: New York University (1967–76), City University of New York, Temple University, Kingsborough Community College (1972–75) and the Manhattan School of Music, where she taught for four decades. She served on the board of the League of Composers/International Society for Contemporary Music.

Mamlok had received two National Endowment for the Arts Grants (1974 and 1981), a Fromm Foundation Grant (1994), a Fellowship from the Guggenheim Foundation (1995) and commissions from various organizations, including the Koussevitzky Foundation, the Eastman School of Music, the Alaria Chamber Ensemble and the San Francisco Symphony Orchestra. In 1984, When Summer Sang, a chamber work for flute, clarinet, violin, cello and piano, was chosen to represent the United States at the International Rostrum of Composers. Mamlok also received a Commendation of Excellence in 1987 "for her contribution to the world of concert music."

The C. F. Peters Corporation, American Composers Edition, McGuinness and Marx, Casia Publishing, and Hildegard Publishing companies have published Mamlok's compositions. She made the scores of many of her works available herself. In 2006, Mamlock moved to Berlin, where she died on May 4, 2016.

== Notable students ==
- Alba Lucía Potes Cortés
- Alex Shapiro
- Tania León

== Discography ==
- From My Garden, Designs, Sonata – Catherine Tait, violin; Barry Snyder, piano; Music for Violin and Piano by American Women Composers – Gasparo GSCD 300
- Rhapsody – for clarinet, viola and piano, Earplay – Centaur CRC 2274
- Panta Rhei – The Francesco Trio; Contemporary American Piano Trios, Vol. 2 – Music and Art CD 933
- Five Intermezzi for Solo Guitar – Todd Seelye, guitar; Sheer Pluck – Music and Art CD 1032
- Constellations for Orchestra, Polarities, Der Andreasgarten, Girasol, and String Quartet No. 2 – Ursula Mamlok, CRI CD 806
- Panta Rhei, Variations for Solo Flute, When Summer Sang, Stray Birds, Sextet – American Masters – Ursula Mamlok, CRI CD 891
- String Quartet No. 1, Polyphony No. 1, Confluences, 2000 Notes, Rhapsody (Spectrum Concerts Berlin, Armida Quartet)
- Cantata based on Psalm 1; Songs of Joy and Sorrow
- Elegy (slow movement from Concertino for woodwind quintet, string orchestra, and percussion) - Journeys: Orchestral Works by American Women - Leonarda Productions, LE327, 1985. Also includes music of Nancy Van De Vate, Kay Gardner, Libby Larsen, Marga Richter, Katherine Hoover, Jane Brockman. Performed by Bournemouth Sinfonietta, Arioso Chamber Orchestra, Carolann Martin: Conductor.
- [Music of] Ursula Mamlok, Vols. 1–6, Bridge Records releases 2009–2023

== See also ==
- List of female composers by birth year and List of female composers by name

== Bibliography ==
- Naxos: Composer Biography. Accessed July 29, 2010.
- Petersen, Barbara. "Mamlok, Ursula", Grove Music Online Accessed April 19, 2007.
- "Sigma Alpha Iota Philanthropies, Inc" Accessed April 20, 2007.
- Habakuk Traber: Time in Flux : die Komponistin Ursula Mamlok, Wien; Köln; Weimar: Böhlau-Verlag, 2012, ISBN 978-3-412-20440-2
- Roxane Prévost, "Metrical Reinterpretations in Ursula Mamlok's Panta Rhei, IV (1981)", Canadian University Music Review, No. 23/1-2 (2003).
