= Boyd McDonald (composer) =

Canadian pianist, composer and music educator (b.1932)

Boyd McDonald (born 28 September 1932) is a Canadian pianist, fortepianist, composer, and music educator. An associate of the Canadian Music Centre, his compositional output includes works for choirs, bands, orchestras, and art songs. His works have been performed throughout Canada and Europe by ensembles like the Kitchener-Waterloo Symphony, the Renaissance Singers, the Scholars of London, Symphony Hamilton, the Waterloo Chamber Players, and the Wellington Winds among others.

A documentary film regarding Boyd's life, "From the City of Bridges to the City of Lights", premiered on 27 October 2024 in Kitchener, Ontario, Canada.

== Early life and education ==
Born in Tuberose, Saskatchewan, McDonald studied at The Royal Conservatory of Music where he earned an associate diploma in 1951 and a licentiate diploma in 1953. Among his teachers were Murray Adaskin (music composition) and Lyell Gustin (piano). A grant from the Canada Council enabled him to pursue further studies in Paris from 1957 to 1960 with Nadia Boulanger (composition) and Jean Casadesus (piano). He also studied composition in the summers with John Cage, Darius Milhaud, and Stefan Wolpe.

== Career ==
In 1963 McDonald won the Leschetizky Debut Prize which led to his New York City recital debut at Town Hall.

In 1966 McDonald formed a piano duo with Garth Beckett, and the pair continued to perform together up through the 1990s. The duo toured North America and Europe together on several occasions. They made their London debut at Wigmore Hall in 1972 and their New York debut at Alice Tully Hall in 1978. The pair commissioned works by such composers as Bruce Mather, Robert Turner, Jack Behrens, and Owen Underhill.

In 1967 both men joined the music faculty of the University of Manitoba where they studied the duo piano repertoire with Alma Brock-Smith while teaching. They left the UM in 1976 to join the faculty at Wilfrid Laurier University (WLU). At WLU McDonald was co-ordinator of the summer baroque and classical workshop in addition to teaching classes in piano and music theory. McDonald began to pursue studies in the music of the 18th- and early 19th-century fortepiano during the early 1980s. He obtained a Steinway instrument that replicated a five-octave, mid-1780s fortepiano in 1984. In 1986 he toured Manitoba and Saskatchewan giving lecture/recitals in the fortepiano repertoire. In 1988 he acquired an 1816 six-and-a-half-octave Streicher piano. In 1989 he toured Nova Scotia as a member of the Mannheim Trio with soprano Valerie Kinslow and clarinetist Sherman Friedland. He gave a fortepiano recital tour throughout Canada in 1990; notably including in his repertoire works written for him by Behrens and Underhill. He was also busy performing with the Classical Trio during the 1980s and 1990s, a chamber group he formed with baroque violinist Jeanne Lamon and baroque cellist Christina Mahler. He also made several appearances at the Boston Early Music Festival serving as baritone David Falk's accompanist. He also appeared numerous times as a soloist on the CBC Radio program Two New Hours.

Throughout his career, McDonald composed musical works in several genres. including the 1998 Borders with Shadows, reflecting his visit to Natal. Since 2009, he has chaired the board of directors of the Canadian baroque ensemble Nota Bene Baroque in the Waterloo Region of Ontario, Canada.

In 2010, McDonald was presented with a Lifetime Achievement Award at the 22nd annual Kitchener-Waterloo arts awards. He continues to teach part-time at the WLU as a professor emeritus.
