= A Midsummer Night's Dream (Eugene Ormandy recording) =

- RCA Victor Red Seal CD: RD 82084

Studio album by Eugene Ormandy
- Released: 1977
- Studio: Scottish Rite Cathedral, Philadelphia
- Genre: Classical
- Length: 51:38
- Language: German
- Label: RCA Victor Red Seal
- Producer: Jay David Saks

A Midsummer Night's Dream is a 51-minute studio album containing the overture and most of the incidental music that Felix Mendelssohn wrote to accompany William Shakespeare's play of the same name. It is performed by Judith Blegen, Frederica von Stade, the Women's Voices of the Mendelssohn Club of Philadelphia and the Philadelphia Orchestra under the direction of Eugene Ormandy. It was released in 1977.

== Background ==
The album omits Nos. 4, 10 and 12 from Mendelssohn's score, replacing the latter with a relocated No. 8, a reprise of part of the Nocturne and a brief violin solo. The vocal numbers use the German texts for which Mendelssohn composed his music, not the English verses from which they were translated.

The album is the first of two recordings of the work in which Frederica von Stade took part. In the second, released on CD by Deutsche Grammophon in 1994, she performed a more nearly complete, English-language version of the score with Kathleen Battle, the Tanglewood Festival Chorus, the Boston Symphony Orchestra, Seiji Ozawa and the actor Judi Dench, who contributed passages of narration between Mendelssohn's musical numbers. For details, see A Midsummer Night's Dream (Seiji Ozawa recording).

== Recording ==
The album was recorded using analogue technology on 20 April, 6 May and 12 May 1976 in the Scottish Rite Cathedral, Philadelphia, Pennsylvania.

== Packaging ==
The cover of the album was designed under the art direction of J. J. Stelmach, and features a previously unpublished painting by Arthur Rackham held in the collection of Mr and Mrs Michael Loeb of New York City.

== Critical reception ==
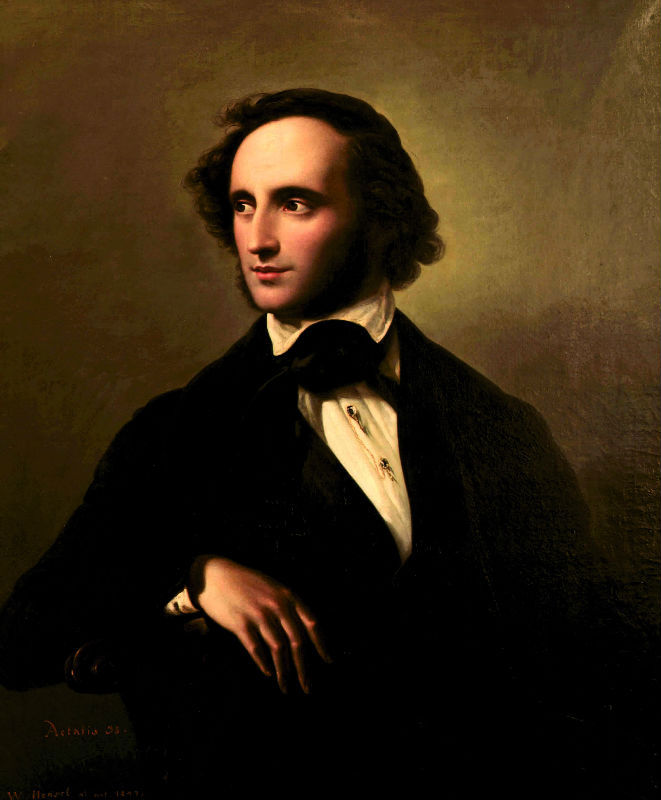
A portrait of Mendelssohn painted by Wilhelm Hensel in 1847

Edward Greenfield reviewed the album on LP in Gramophone in October 1978, comparing it with earlier versions conducted by Otto Klemperer, André Previn and Raymond Leppard. The four recordings differed not just in matters of interpretation, but also in regard to how much of Mendelssohn's music they included. Previn and Leppard served up every note that Mendelssohn had written, even the briefest of his melodramas. Klemperer left several fragments out. Eugene Ormandy pursued a middle way, retaining some items that Klemperer rejected but omitting No. 4, No. 10 and No.12, replacing the latter with a relocated No. 8 augmented with "a fragment of the Nocturne plus a radiant violin descant". A more conspicuous feature of Ormandy's disc was that its soloists' and chorus's contributions were sung in German translations of William Shakespeare's verse rather than, as was customary, in the playwright's own, English words. This was historically correct: Mendelssohn had composed his music for a staging of A Midsummer Night's Dream in Berlin, and had set his music to a text translated into German by Schlegel and Tieck. Moreover, performing his score in English necessitated altering his notes, repeatedly changing a pair of quavers into a quaver followed by two semi-quavers. However, Greenfield felt that he "would certainly prefer English every time, if only because the sibilant German consonants make the fairies sound as though they are taken with little sneezes".

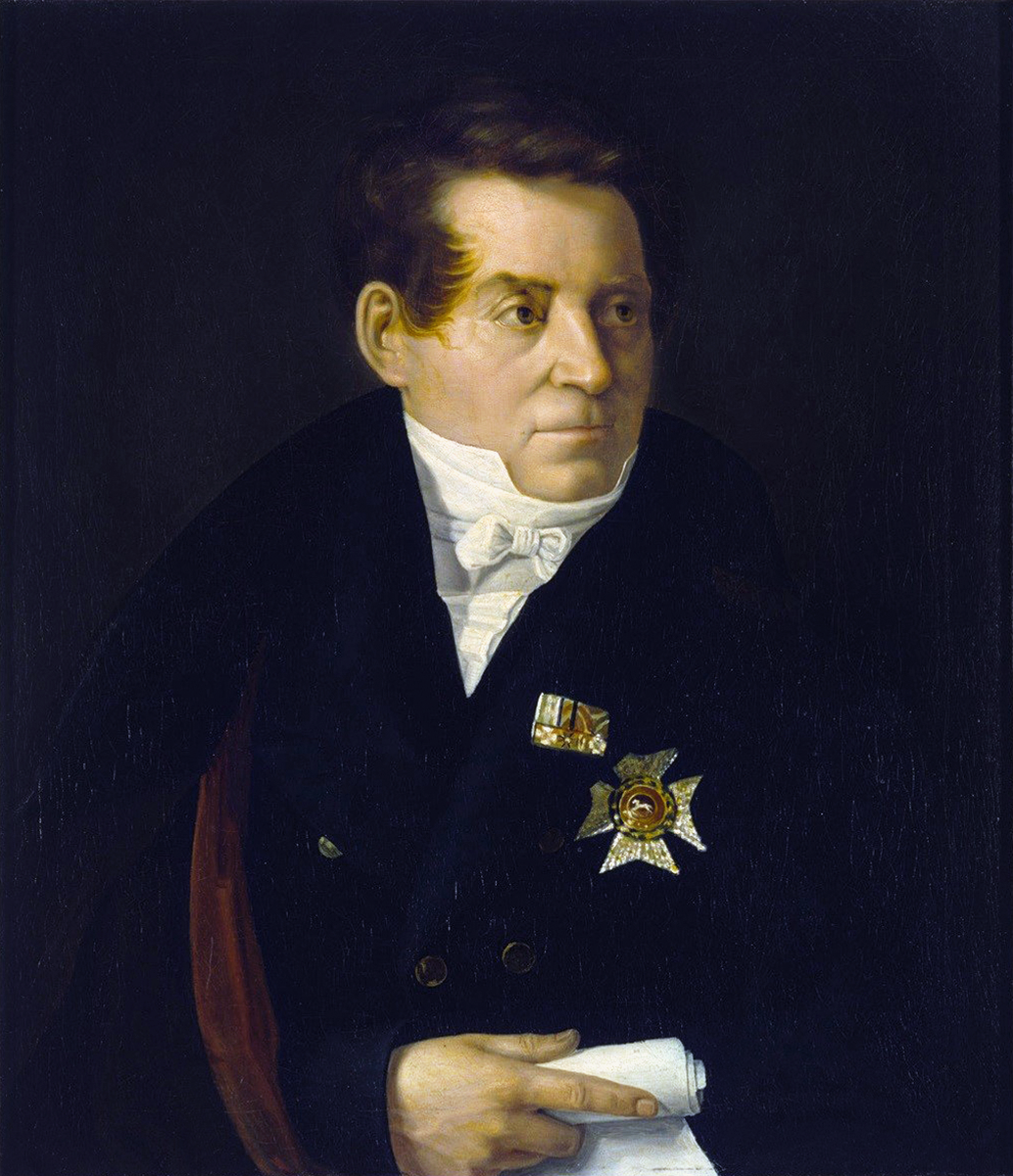
A portrait of August Wilhelm Schlegel painted by Adolf Hohneck

About how well or badly Ormandy's fairies sang Greenfield had nothing to say, but he did praise the Philadelphia Orchestra's playing as beautiful and "finely disciplined". Ormandy's conducting, on the other hand, left him slightly disappointed. Klemperer was "more strikingly characterful", and Ormandy's reading of "Bunte Schlangen" ("You spotted snakes") sounded "relatively sluggish" after listening to Previn's or Leppard's. Previn and Leppard were in general lighter and more playful than Ormandy. The new album was exquisitely engineered, delivering "glorious sound recorded fully and richly with plenty of inner detail", but all in all, Previn's and Leppard's discs were marginally preferable.

Greenfield revisited the album in Gramophone in January 1986, when it had been issued on CD. "Interpretatively, Ormandy scores consistently," he wrote, "...whether in the mystery of the fairy music, ... the natural, unforced sweetness of the slow coda of the Overture or the lightness of pointing in the Scherzo. Also, the soloists of the Philadelphia Orchestra consistently outshine [those on a rival recording]."

In an article about classical music's basic repertoire that he contributed to Stereo Review in November 1983, Richard Freed praised Eugene Ormandy's album as even better than a "much-admired, nearly complete recording conducted by Peter Maag". Ormandy, he wrote, offered "an even fuller selection, richer sound and the superb Judith Blegen and Frederica von Stade in the vocal numbers".

== CD track listing ==
The Chandos portrait of Shakespeare, from the National Portrait Gallery, London

Felix Mendelssohn Bartholdy (1809-1847)

A Midsummer Night's Dream, with a text taken from A Midsummer Night's Dream by William Shakespeare (1564-1611), translated into German by August Wilhelm Schlegel (1767-1845) and Dorothea Tieck (1799-1841)

Overture, Op. 21 (1826)

- 1 (12:32) Overture, Allegro di molto

Incidental music, Op. 61 (1843)

- 2 (4:46) No. 1: Scherzo, Allegro vivace
- 3 (0:33) No. 2: Melodrama, L'istesso tempo
- 4 (1:25) Elfenmarsch (March of the fairies), Allegro vivace
- 5 (4:57) No. 3: Lied mit Chor (Song with Chorus), "Bunte Schlangen" ("You spotted snakes"), Allegro ma non troppo
- 6 (3:31) No. 5: Intermezzo, Allegro appassionato
- 7 (2:34) No. 6: Melodrama, Allegro
- 8 (6:33) No. 7: Nocturne, Con moto tranquillo
- 9 (5:24) No. 9: Hochzeitsmarsch (Wedding march), Allegro vivace
- 10 (1:04) Marcia funebre (Funeral march), Allegro comodo
- 11 (1:45) No. 11: Ein Tanz von Rüpeln (A dance of clowns), Allegro di molto
- 12 (1:28) No. 8: Melodrama, Andante
- 13 (4:52) No. 14: Finale, Allegro di molto

== Personnel ==
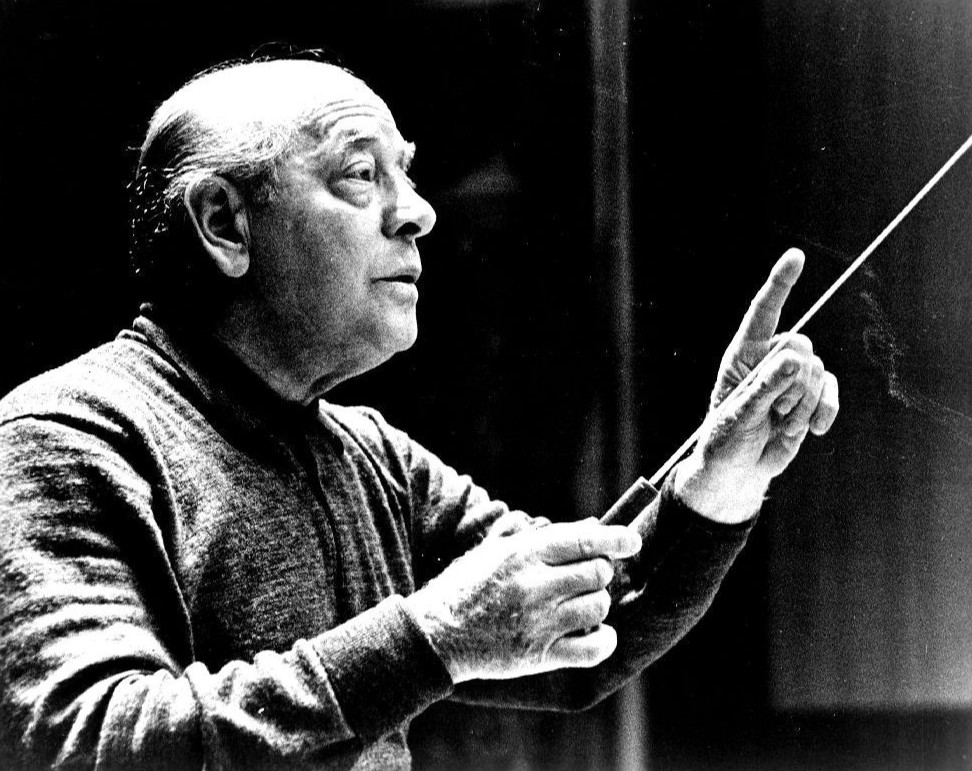
Eugene Ormandy in 1973

=== Musical ===
- Judith Blegen, soprano, First Fairy
- Frederica von Stade, mezzo-soprano, Second Fairy
- Murray Panitz, flute
- Mason Jones, horn
- Women's Voices of the Mendelssohn Club of Philadelphia
- Eugene Ormandy, conductor

=== Other ===
- Jay David Saks, producer
- Paul Goodman, engineer

== Release history ==
In 1977, RCA Victor Red Seal released the album on LP (catalogue numbers RL 12084 and ARL1-2084) and cassette (catalogue numbers RK 12084 and ARK1-2084). The LP sleeve had photographs of Blegen and von Stade and notes by Jay David Saks and George R. Marek.

In 1985, RCA Victor Red Seal issued the album on CD (catalogue number RD 82084), with a 16-page insert booklet including notes by Jay David Saks and George R. Marek in English, French and German but no photographs, artist biographies, texts or translations.
