= MCV =

MCV may refer to:

== Business ==
- Manufacturing Commercial Vehicles, an Egyptian commercial vehicle manufacturer owned by Daimler AG
- MCV Broadband, former name of Docomo Pacific, a telecommunications company in Guam
- MCV Bus and Coach, a bus body builder, based in Ely, Cambridgeshire, England
- Midland Cogeneration Venture, a natural gas fired electrical and steam co-generation plant in Midland, Michigan
- McV is a former identity of McVitie's biscuits
- Mobile Content Venture, a joint venture of United States broadcast groups dedicated to improving mobile DTV content

== Medicine ==
- Mutated citrullinated vimentin, anti-MCV is a biomarker for diagnosing rheumatoid arthritis
- Mean corpuscular volume, a measure of red blood cell volume
- Merkel cell polyomavirus, a DNA virus of the polyomavirus group
- Molluscum contagiosum virus, a DNA poxvirus
- Meningococcal conjugate vaccine, a conjugated vaccine

== Science and technology ==
- Mesoscale convective vortex, in meteorology
- Model–view–controller architecture, in software engineering

== Transportation ==
- Manchester Victoria station, its National Rail station code
- Mega City Vehicle, the former name of the BMW i3, an urban electric car
- Morris Cowley Van, a car-based light van based on the Morris Oxford (1950–1956)
- McArthur River Mine Airport, IATA airport code for McArthur River Mine Airport, Northern Territory Australia

== Video gaming ==
- MCV (magazine), a UK based trade magazine focused on the video game industry
- Mobile Construction Vehicle, in the Command & Conquer game series

== Military ==
- Type-92 MCV, a mine clearance vehicle of the Japan Ground Self-Defense Force
- Type 16 maneuver combat vehicle, a wheeled tank destroyer of the Japan Ground Self-Defense Force

== Other uses ==
- Medical College of Virginia, the former name of the VCU Medical Center in Richmond, Virginia
- Middlesex County Volunteers, an 18th-century colonial fife & drum corps in the Greater Boston area, Massachusetts, USA
- Modular Capture Vessel, ships specialized on capturing unwanted liquids on the sea - f.i. leaked oil
- MCV, the year 1105 in Roman numerals
- Living Colombia Movement (Movimiento Colombia Viva), a Colombian political party
- Miss Chinese (Vancouver) Pageant, the annual Vancouver beauty pageant for Chinese Canadians
