= Georg August Goldfuss =

German scientist (1782–1848)

Georg August Goldfuß
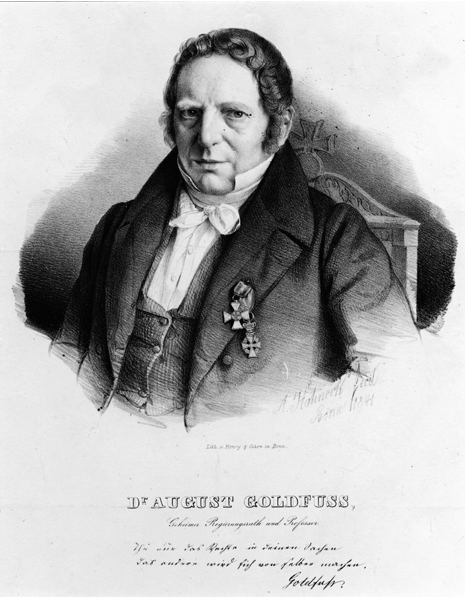
- Georg August Goldfuß; by Adolf Hohneck (1841)
- Born: 18 April 1782
- Died: 2 October 1848 (aged 66)

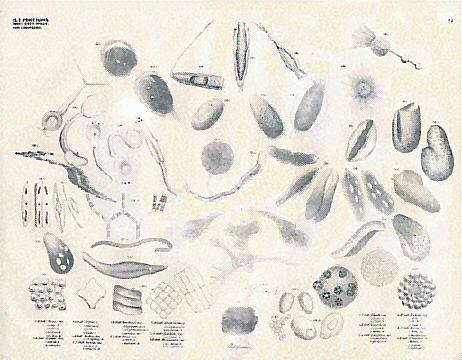
Illustration of class Protozoa, order Infusoria, family Monades by Goldfuß

Georg August Goldfuß (18 April 1782 – 2 October 1848) was a German palaeontologist, zoologist and botanist. He became a professor of zoology at the University of Erlangen and later at the University of Bonn. He coined the terms "protozoa" and "pelecypoda".

== Life and work ==
Goldfuß was born at Thurnau near Bayreuth. His father, a court physician, Johann August Goldfuß (1748–85) died in an accident on a voyage to the East Indies. His mother Margarete née Waechter died in 1799. After studies at the Latin school in Thurnau, he went to study medicine in 1800 first at Arzberg and then at the Collegium Medico-chirurgium in Berlin. At Berlin he was influenced by lectures by Carl Ludwig Willdenow (1765-1812). He received a scholarship from the Prussian government, and he dedicated his thesis to the officer Karl Freiherr vom Stein zum Altenstein (1770-1840). He completed his doctorate at Erlangen in 1804 with a thesis on South African beetles. He worked briefly at the natural history collection in Erlangen but lost the position after the French invasion of 1806. He edited the magazine Politische Zeitung, and in 1808, he was a founder of a medical law firm in Erlangen. After serving as a private tutor for Baron Winkler von Mohrenfels in Helmhofen he considered moving to Calcutta, but this was scuttled by a blockade imposed by Napoleon. Following the vacancies created by the death of his teachers Johann von Schreber (1739-1810) and Eugen Esper (1742-1810), he worked as a lecturer in zoology from 1811 and became professor of zoology at the University of Erlangen. He was admitted to the Leopoldina Academy in 1813. In 1818, he moved to the newly established Rheinische Friedrich-Wilhelms-Universität Bonn where he was involved in establishing a natural history museum. He took a keen interest in fossils and introduced the term protozoa in that year although he included not just single-celled organisms but included polyps, bryozoans and rotifers. He was subsequently appointed professor of zoology and mineralogy at the University of Bonn. Aided by Count Georg zu Münster, he issued the important Petrefacta Germaniae (1826–44), a work which was intended to illustrate the invertebrate fossils of Germany, but it was left incomplete after the sponges, corals, crinoids, echinoderms and part of the mollusca had been figured. A collection of Goldfuß' botanical specimens are housed at Bonn University. 06.04.2024)

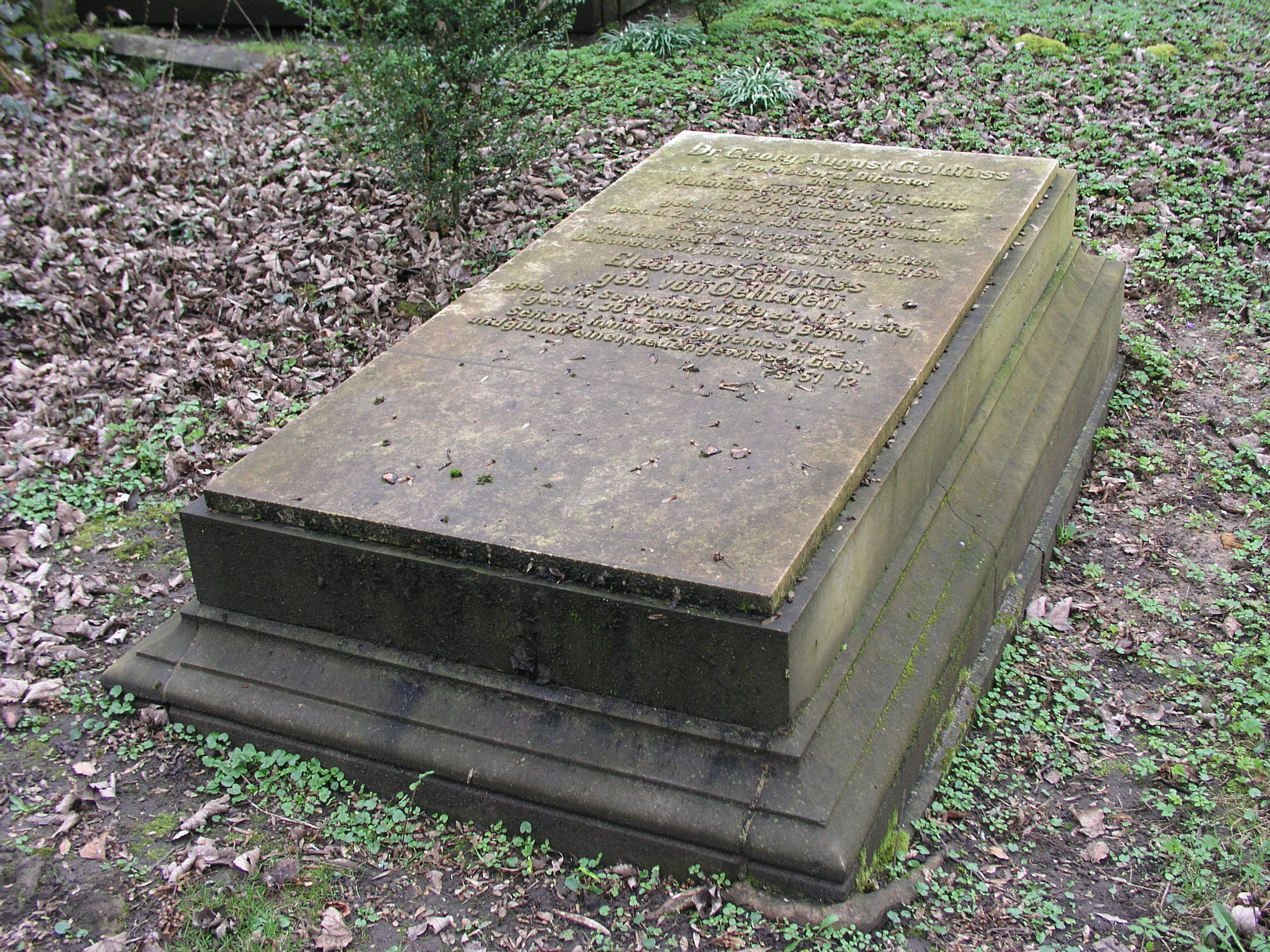
Grave in Poppeldorf

Goldfuß married Eleonore Oelhafen (1789-1873) in 1815 and they had five sons and six daughters. One of his sons, Otto Goldfuß (1831-1905), became a malacologist. He received an Order of the Red Eagle III Class from the Prussian empire in 1822. He was a Freemason and a member of the Lebanon lodge of Erlangen. He built a large home Rosenburg in Kessenich, Bonn. He suffered from chest disease from 1847 and died from a stroke. He was buried in Poppelsdorf. A street in Bonn was named after him.

== Publications ==
- Enumeratio Insectorum Eleutheratorum Capitis Bonae Spei totiusque Africae descriptione iconibusque nonnullarum specierum novarum, Erlangen 1804
- Die Umgebungen von Muggendorf. Ein Taschenbuch für Freunde der Natur und Alterthumskunde, Erlangen 1810 Scanned book
- Mikroskopische Beobachtungen über die Metamorphose des vegetabilischen und animalischen Lebens, in: Abhandlungen der Erlanger Societät, Band 1, Erlangen 1810
- Naturbeschreibung der Säugethiere, Erlangen 1812
- Über die Metamorphose des animalischen und vegetabilischen Lebens, in: Abhandlungen der Erlanger Societät, Band 2, Erlangen 1812
- Physikalisch-statistische Beschreibung des Fichtelgebirges, mit G. Bischof, Nürnberg 1817 Zweiter Theil Scanned book
- Ueber die Entwicklungsstufen des Thieres, Nürnberg 1817 Scanned book (Nachdruck Basilisken-Presse, Marburg 1979)
- Handbuch der Zoologie, Nürnberg 1818 Scanned book
- Beschreibung eines fossilen Vielfraß-Schädels aus der Gailenreuther Höle, in: Novis Actis physico-medicis Acad. Caesareae Leopolodino-Carolinae naturae curiosum, Erlangen 1818
- Ein Wort über die Bedeutung naturwissenschaftlicher Institute und über ihren Einfluss auf humane Bildung, Bonn 1821. (Scanned book)
- Naturhistorischer Atlas, 1.–23. Heft, Düsseldorf 1824–1843 Tafel 101–200 Scanned book
- Naturhistorischer Atlas, [nebst] Erl. 1 – 4., Arnz, Düsseldorf 1826 Digitized
- Grundriß der Zoologie, Nürnberg 1826, 2. Auflage 1834 Scanned book
- Beiträge zur Petrefactenkunde. 1838 Scanned book
- Petrefacta Germaniae. Tam ea, quae in museo universitatis Regia Borussicae Fridericiae Wilhelmiae Rhenanae servantur, quam alia quaecunque in museis Hoeninghusiano Muensteriano aliisque extant, iconibus et descriptionibus illustrata = Abbildungen und Beschreibungen der Petrefacten Deutschlands und der angränzenden Länder, unter Mitwirkung von Georg Graf zu Münster, Düsseldorf 1826–1844 Archive, Erster Theil. 2. Auflage 1862 Scanned book
- Der Schädelbau des Mosasaurus, durch Beschreibung einer neuen Art Gattung. Mainz 1842 Scanned book
- Beiträge zur vorweltlichen Fauna des Steinkohlengebirges. Bonn 1847 Scanned book
- Ein Seestern aus der Grauwacke. In: Verhandlungen des naturhistorischen Vereines der preussischen Rheinlande, 5, Bonn 1848, Tafel 5 (Digitalisat), S. 145–146 (Scanned book)

== Literature ==
- Georg Uschmann (1964). "Goldfuß, August". Neue Deutsche Biographie (in German). Vol. 6. Berlin: Duncker & Humblot. pp. 605–605.
- Wolfhart Langer: Georg August Goldfuß - Ein biographischer Beitrag in: Bonner Geschichtsblätter, Band 23/1969, S. 229-243
