= A Midsummer Night's Dream (Seiji Ozawa recording) =

- Deutsche Grammophon CD, 439 897-2

Studio album of Mendelssohn's A Midsummer Night's Dream by Seiji Ozawa
- Released: 1994
- Studio: Symphony Hall, Boston
- Genre: Classical
- Length: 55:38
- Language: English
- Label: Deutsche Grammophon
- Producer: Christian Gansch

A Midsummer Night's Dream is a 55-minute studio album containing the overture and almost all of the incidental music that Felix Mendelssohn wrote to accompany William Shakespeare's play of the same name. It is performed by Kathleen Battle, Frederica von Stade, the Tanglewood Festival Chorus and the Boston Symphony Orchestra under the direction of Seiji Ozawa, with interlinking passages of verse spoken by Judi Dench. It was released in 1994.

== Background ==
The album includes all of Mendelssohn's incidental music for A Midsummer Night's Dream except his score's No. 6, a melodrama. The vocal numbers are sung in Shakespeare's English rather than in the German translation by August Wilhelm Schlegel and Dorothea Tieck that Mendelssohn set, necessitating a few small deviations from Mendelssohn's original score.

The album is the second of two recordings of the work in which Frederica von Stade took part. In the first, released by RCA Victor Red Seal on LP in 1977 and on CD in 1985, she performed a shorter, reordered German-language version of the score with Judith Blegen and the Philadelphia Orchestra under the direction of Eugene Ormandy. For details, see A Midsummer Night's Dream (Eugene Ormandy recording).

== Recording ==
The album was digitally recorded in October 1992 in Symphony Hall, Boston.

== Cover art ==
The cover of the album features a painting by Friedrich Hechelmann.

== Critical reception ==
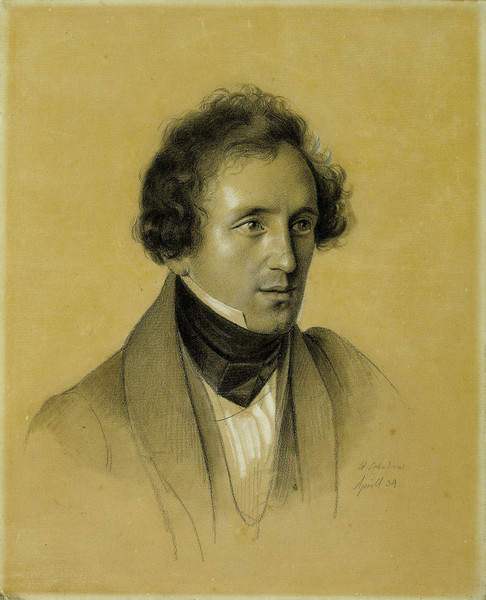
Felix Mendelssohn painted by Friedrich Wilhelm Schadow in 1834

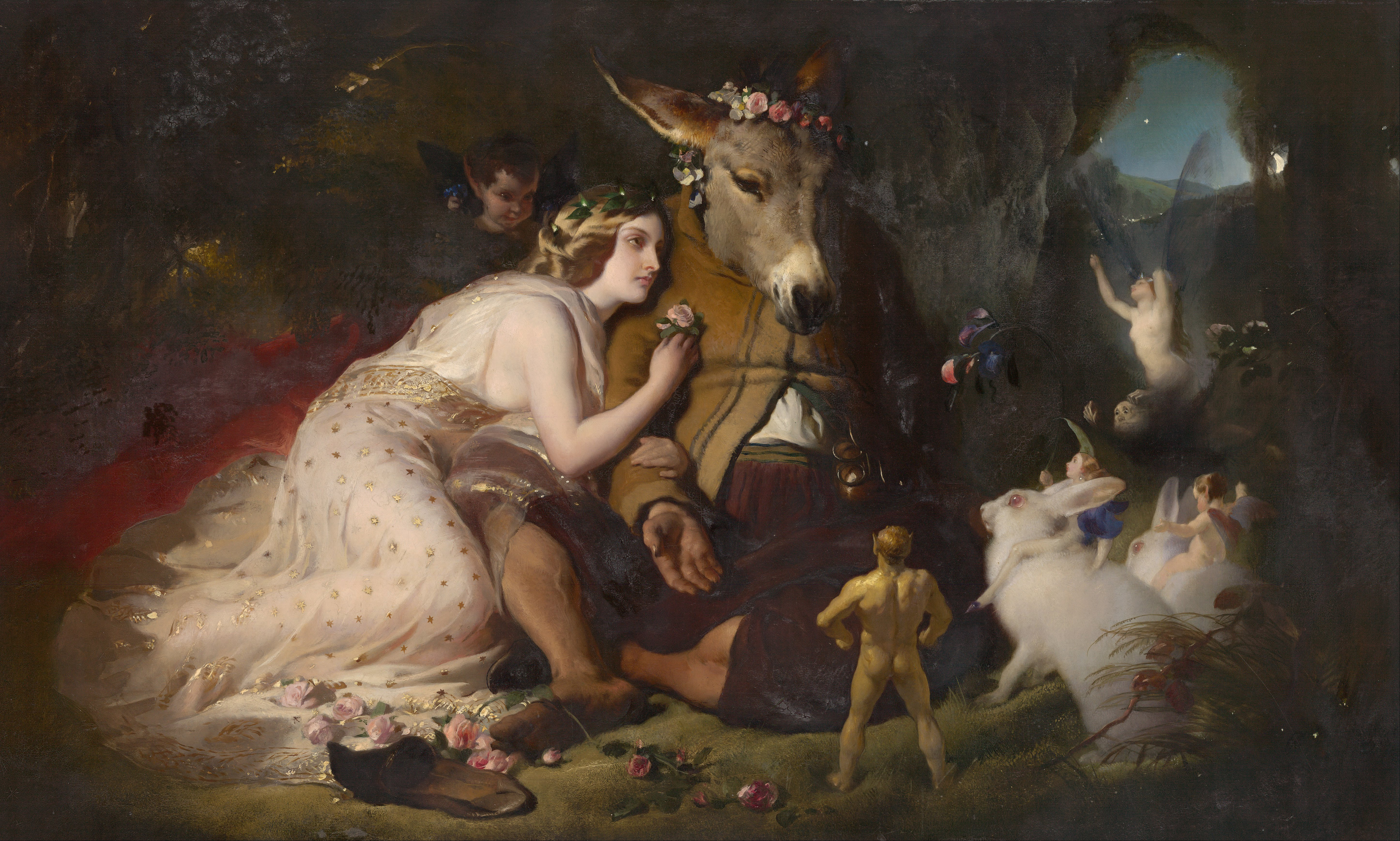
Scene from A Midsummer Night's Dream: Titania and Bottom by Edwin Landseer (1848)

Alan Sanders reviewed the album in Gramophone in October 1994, comparing it with what he considered to be the best recording of the work to have appeared thitherto, a Teldec disc conducted by Kurt Masur. Kathleen Battle, Frederica von Stade and the Tanglewood Festival Chorus had all sung "with great distinction", he wrote. And the playing of the Boston Symphony Orchestra was "of the highest quality" and "beautifully brought off" from the first bar of the album to the last. But the brightest star in the CD's constellation of talents was Seiji Ozawa. Conducting with precision, pointedness and more fantasy than Masur had supplied, he struck "an ideal balance between conveying the underlying strength of Mendelssohn's writing and bringing out the music's wide-eyed freshness, its delicacy and its gentle, slightly teasing sense of humour". His reading of the Overture, for example, was powerful and cogent, but he was alert to every detail of the score and it seemed as though he was conducting with a smile. The only charge that could be laid against him was that his pace in the Scherzo was slightly slower than some listeners might prefer. Taken as a whole, the album had one minor weakness and one decisive advantage. Its flaw was that it fell just short of presenting Mendelssohn's score in its entirety: a single number, an allegro, was omitted. The lacuna amounted to merely a few minutes of "brief and sometimes repetitive orchestral comments", but the missing bars were engaging and their absence was regrettable. But this irritating solecism was not grave enough to outweigh the asset that the album enjoyed in its narrator, Judi Dench. Where Masur's disc had passages of interpolated dialogue in German, Ozawa's had excerpts from Shakespeare's text spoken by Dench in English. Her first appearance (amidst the closing notes of the Scherzo) was somewhat jolting, but the "great character and wit" of her subsequent contributions were what "[lifted] the issue above all other competition". The album was an "[almost] ideal representation of Mendelssohn's music for Shakespeare's play", and it came with the bonus of audio quality that was first class.

Richard Freed reviewed the album in Stereo Review in September 1995, following his British predecessor in comparing it with Kurt Masur's rival version. Frederica von Stade, he wrote, was "every bit as persuasive" as Seiji Ozawa's Second Fairy as she had been when recording A Midsummer Night's Dream for Eugene Ormandy. And Kathleen Battle, the Tanglewood Festival Chorus and the Boston Symphony Orchestra sang and played as well as they knew how to. It was plain, too, that for Seiji Ozawa, making his album had been a labour of love – his disc was a beautiful one, and Masur's could not equal its charm. It was unfortunate that like Masur, Ozawa had spoiled Mendelssohn's music by interpolating a spoken narration. That the intrusive text was delivered in English rather than in German scarcely made it less of an annoyance. Judi Dench was an actress of distinction, but her contributions were unnecessarily lengthy, and Freed was alienated by "[her] intensity, [her] jarring entrances and by her pauses after each line of verse, irrespective of expressive sense". If Mendelssohn's music was not heard in the context of a complete performance of Shakespeare's play, it was best enjoyed with either a bare minimum of narration or with none. Deutsche Grammophon had recorded the album's musical items "handsomely", but Dench sometimes sounded as though she was speaking "from the depths of a cistern".

== CD track listing ==
Felix Mendelssohn Bartholdy (1809–1847)

A Midsummer Night's Dream, with a text taken from A Midsummer Night's Dream by William Shakespeare (1564–1616) and narration adapted from the play by Evans Mirageas and Seiji Ozawa

Overture, Op. 21 (1826)

- 1 (11:55) Overture, Allegro di molto

Incidental Music, Op. 61 (1843)

- 2 (4:47) No. 1, Scherzo, Allegro vivace
  - "How now, spirit! whither wander you", Narrator
- 3 (1:52) No. 2, Melodrama, L'istesso tempo
  - "Over hill, over dale", Narrator
- 4 (1:37) Elfenmarsch (March of the fairies), Allegro vivace
  - "I know a bank where the wild thyme grows", Narrator
- 5 (4:44) No. 3, Lied mit Chor (Song with Chorus), "Bunte Schlangen" ("You spotted snakes"), First Fairy, Second Fairy and Chorus, Allegro ma non troppo
  - "Come, now a roundel and a fairy song", Narrator
- 6 (0:41) No. 4, Melodrama, Andante – Allegro molto
  - "What thou see'st when thou dost wake", Narrator
- 7 (4:08) "Help me, Lysander, help me!", Narrator
  - No. 5, Intermezzo, Allegro appassionato
- 8 (6:21) "On the ground sleep sound", Narrator
  - No. 7, Nocturne, Con molto tranquillo
- 9 (2:32) "Her dotage now I do begin to pity", Narrator
  - No. 8, Melodrama, Andante
  - "Be as thou wast wont to be", Narrator
- 10 (5:07) No. 9, Hochzeitsmarsch (Wedding march), Allegro vivace
- 11 (0:47) "Gentles, perchance you wonder at this show", Narrator
  - No. 10, Melodrama, Allegro comodo
  - "Anon comes Pyramus", Narrator
- 12 (1:34) Marcia funebre (Funeral march), Andante comodo
- 13 (2:05) "Will it please you to see the epilogue", Narrator
  - No. 11, Ein Tanz von Rüpeln (A dance of clowns), Allegro di molto
  - "The iron tongue of midnight hath told twelve", Narrator
- 14 (1:40) No. 12, Melodrama, Allegro vivace come I
  - "Now the hungry lion roars", Narrator
- 15 (5:48) No. 13, Finale, "Through the house give glimmering light", First Fairy and Chorus, Allegro di molto
  - "Through the house give glimmering light", Narrator

== Personnel ==
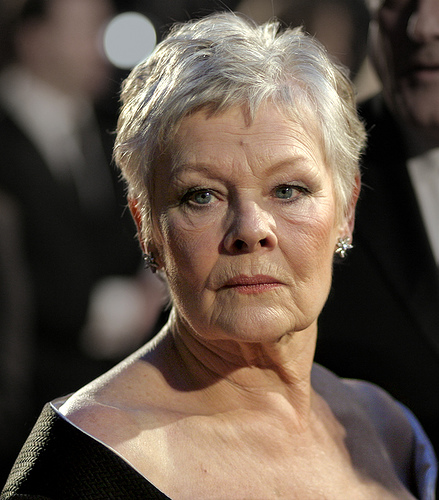
Dame Judi Dench, 2007

=== Performers ===
- Kathleen Battle, soprano, First Fairy
- Frederica von Stade, mezzo-soprano, Second Fairy
- Judi Dench, actor, Narrator
- Tanglewood Festival Chorus
- Boston Symphony Orchestra
- John Oliver, chorus master
- Seiji Ozawa, conductor

=== Other ===
- Alison Ames, executive producer
- Pål Christian Moe, associate producer
- Christian Gansch, recording producer
- Hans Peter Schweigmann, balance engineer
- Klaus Behrens, recording engineer

== Release history ==
Deutsche Grammophon released the album on CD (catalogue number 439 897-2) in 1994, with a 36-page insert booklet including photographs of Battle, von Stade, Dench and Ozawa, texts in English, French and German and notes by John Warrack, Siegmar Keil, Susanna Pasticci and Manfred Kelkel in English, German, Italian and French respectively,
