= Boston Pops =

American orchestra based in Boston, Massachusetts

- Orchestra
- Short name: Boston Pops
- Founded: 1885; 141 years ago
- Location: Boston, United States
- Concert hall: Symphony Hall
- Principal conductor: Keith Lockhart
- Website: bso.org

The Boston Pops is an American orchestra based in Boston, specializing in light classical and popular music. The orchestra's music director is Keith Lockhart.

Founded in 1885 as an offshoot of the Boston Symphony Orchestra (BSO), the Boston Pops primarily consists of musicians from the BSO, although generally not all of the first-chair players. The orchestra performs a spring season of popular music and a holiday program in December. For the Pops, the seating on the floor of Symphony Hall is reconfigured from auditorium seating to banquet and cafe seating. The Pops also plays an annual concert at the Hatch Memorial Shell on the Esplanade every Fourth of July. Their performances of Tchaikovsky's "1812 Overture" and Sousa's "The Stars and Stripes Forever" are famous for howitzer cannons firing and fireworks exploding during the former and the unfurling of the American flag that occurs near the end of the latter. Identified with its longtime director Arthur Fiedler, the orchestra has recorded extensively, made frequent tours, and appeared often on television.

== History ==
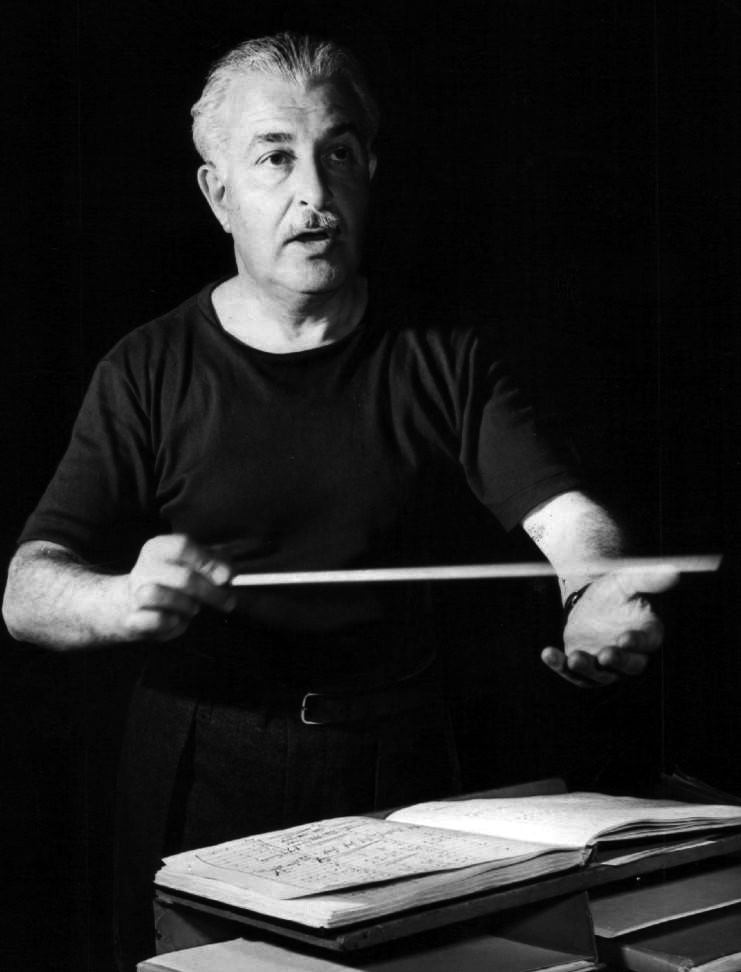
Fiedler conducting for the NBC Radio program Boston Pops Orchestra.

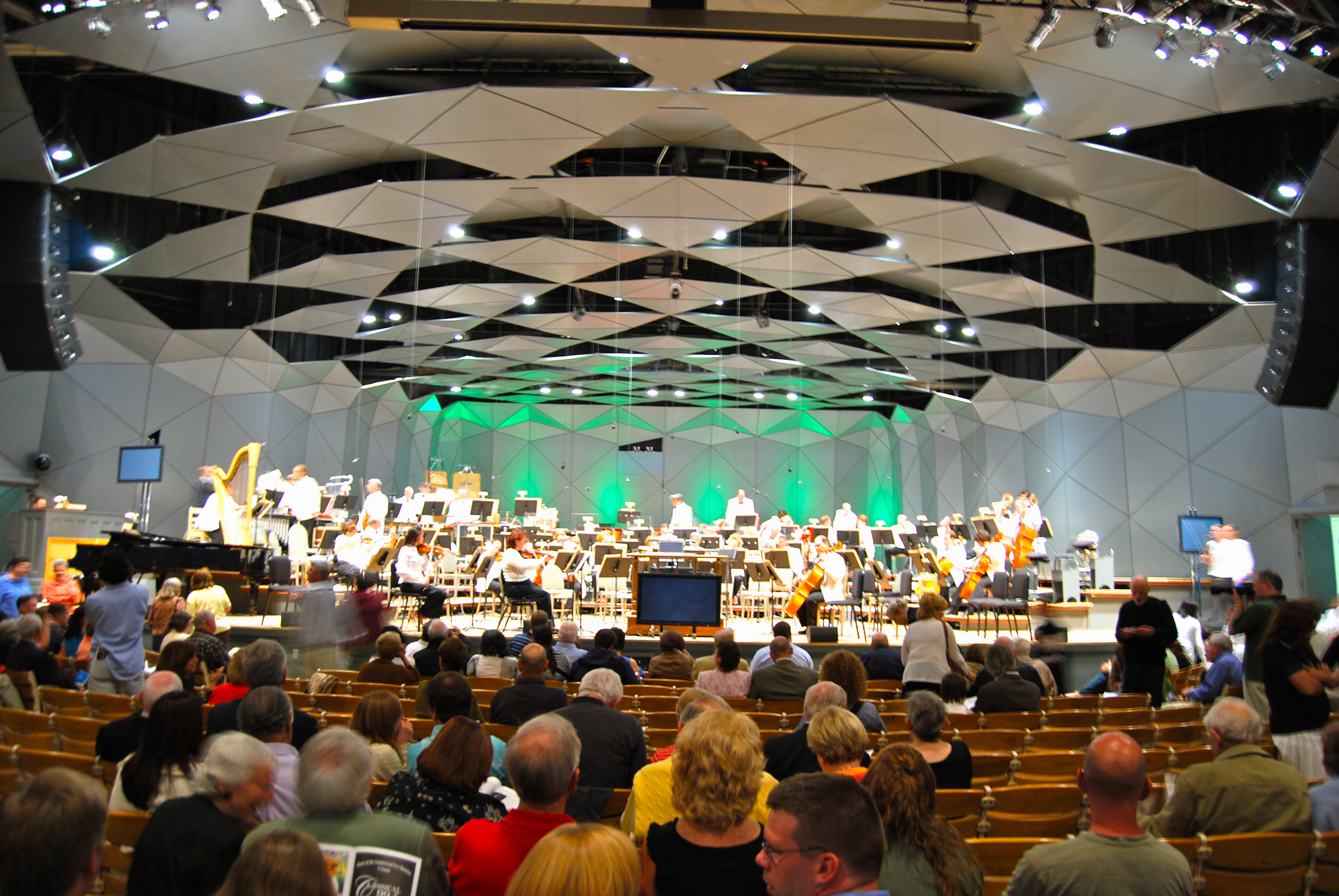
Boston Pops preparing to play at Tanglewood

In 1881, Henry Lee Higginson, the founder of the Boston Symphony Orchestra, wrote of his wish to present in Boston "concerts of a lighter kind of music". The Boston Pops Orchestra was founded to present this kind of music to the public, with the first concert performed on July 11, 1885, under the leadership of Adolf Neuendorff. Called the "Promenade Concerts" until 1900, these performances combined light classical music, tunes from the current hits of the musical theater, and an occasional novelty number. Allowing for some changes of taste over the course of a century, the early programs were remarkably similar to the Boston Pops programs of today.

The Boston Pops had seventeen conductors before 1930, when Arthur Fiedler began a fifty-year tenure as the first American-born conductor to lead the orchestra. Under Fiedler's direction, the orchestra's popularity spread far beyond Boston through recordings, radio and television. Unhappy with the reputation of classical music as being solely for affluent concertgoers, Fiedler made efforts to bring classical music to a wider audience. He instituted a series of free concerts at the Hatch Shell on the Esplanade, a public park beside the Charles River. Fiedler insisted that the Pops Orchestra play popular music as well as well-known classical pieces, opening up a new niche of popular symphonic music. Of the many musical pieces created for the orchestra, the Pops' most identifiable works were the colorful novelty numbers composed by Fiedler's close friend Leroy Anderson, including "Sleigh Ride", "The Typewriter", "The Syncopated Clock" and several others. Fiedler also initiated the annual Holiday Pops concerts in December.

Under Fiedler's direction, the Boston Pops has sold more commercial recordings than any other orchestra in the world, with total sales of albums, singles, tapes, and cassettes exceeding $50 million. The orchestra's first recordings were made in July 1935 for RCA Victor, including the first complete recording of George Gershwin's Rhapsody in Blue. The Pops made their first high-fidelity recording on June 20, 1947, of Gaîté Parisienne (based on the music of Jacques Offenbach), and recorded the same music seven years later in stereophonic sound, their first venture in multitrack recording.

Fiedler is also credited with having begun the annual tradition of the Fourth of July Pops concert and fireworks display on the Esplanade, one of the best-attended Independence Day celebrations in the country with estimated crowds of 200,000–500,000 people. Also during Fiedler's tenure, the Pops and local public television station WGBH developed a series of weekly televised broadcasts, Evening at Pops, recorded during the Pops' regular season in Symphony Hall.

Some shows have holiday–oriented themes, such as Christmas shows featuring performers such as Jonathan Meath, who appeared as Santa with the Boston Pops for ten shows during 2008–2009.

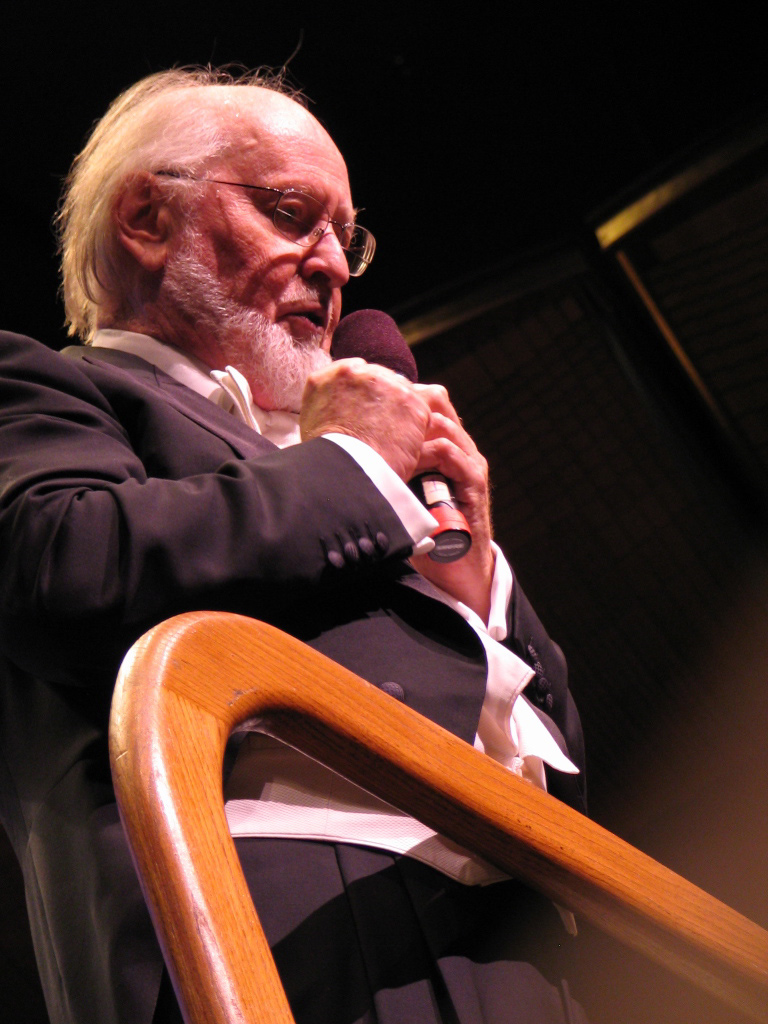
John Williams

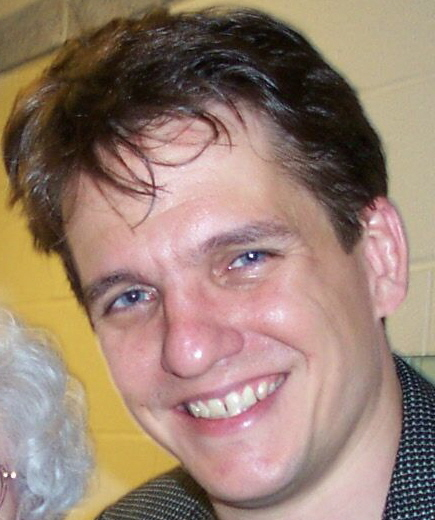
Keith Lockhart

After Fiedler's death in 1979, he was succeeded as conductor of the Boston Pops by the noted film composer John Williams. Williams continued the Pops' tradition of bringing classical music to a wide audience, initiating the annual "Pops-on-the-Heights" concerts at Boston College and adding his own library of well-known film scores (including Star Wars and Indiana Jones) to the orchestra's repertoire. During his time with the Pops, Williams performed with Sammy Davis Jr. as one of the artists for one of the Evening at Pops specials that aired in 1988. In 1991, the orchestra played Bill Monroe's Uncle Pen and other bluegrass classics with Ricky Skaggs and the Kentucky Thunder. In 1992, Williams conducted a memorable performance of the Pops featuring Broadway Icon John Raitt and his daughter Grammy winner Bonnie Raitt along with members of her Band.

Keith Lockhart assumed the post of principal Pops conductor in 1995. Lockhart continues to conduct the Boston Pops today. Williams is Laureate Conductor of the Pops and conducts the Pops at Symphony Hall and Tanglewood.

== Guest artists ==
Lockhart has brought in numerous pop-music acts and icons in addition to Broadway greats (the likes of Idina Menzel, Kristin Chenoweth and Sutton Foster performed with the orchestra throughout Lockhart's first 25 years there) to play with the orchestra since being named conductor, including Ben Folds, Rockapella, Guster, My Morning Jacket, Aimee Mann, Kelly Clarkson, and Elvis Costello.

=== Spring Season ===
==== 2012 ====
Glee star Matthew Morrison performed with the orchestra.

==== 2014: "The Very Best of The Boston Pops" (May 7–June 14, 2014) ====
The 2014 Spring Season was announced towards the end of February 2014, with the title "The Very Best of the Boston Pops".

Opening Night was Wednesday, May 7 at 8 pm, and the orchestra opened with "The Very Best of the Boston Pops with Jason Alexander", conducted by Keith Lockhart.

"The Very Best of the Boston Pops" was conducted by Lockhart and performed on select nights throughout the season, giving audiences both a chance to see what the orchestra was capable of performing (given the various selections from their vast library of compositions) as well as the opportunity to select which dates worked best for them. These performances were given on Thursday, May 8, Friday, May 9, Tuesday, May 27th (Arthur Fiedler Night 2014), and Friday, June 13.

==== 2015 (May 6–June 13, 2015) ====
During the 2015 Pops Spring Season, the orchestra worked with Bernadette Peters (who opened the spring season that year), The Midtown Men, and Audra McDonald. In 2015, the film that was chosen for the "Film with Orchestra" series was Singin' In The Rain. The orchestra also had tributes throughout the season: two nights of the orchestra playing the music of The Beatles; the ever-popular "John Williams Film Night"; a Celtic sojourn hosted by Brian O'Donnovan with Carlos Núñez and Karan Casey as the special guests; the ever-popular "Gospel Night at Pops" conducted by Charles Floyd featuring The Blind Boys of Alabama; the return of "Cirque de la Symphonie" featuring Cirque du Soleil performers; and ending with Simply Sondheim, featuring Marin Mazzie, Jason Danieley and the Tanglewood Music Center Fellows as special guests.

==== 2017: "Lights, Camera…Music: Celebrating Six Decades of John Williams" ====
During the 2017 Pops Spring Season, the orchestra had its first season-long tribute to a composer, that composer being John Williams. They recorded a new CD, Lights, Camera, Music: Six Decades of John Williams, which was released during the season. The orchestra had two pre-season events which marked the first time the orchestra had ever used Symphony Hall before May: "Celebrating John Williams!" and "E.T. in Concert". The Pops opened the season with Queen Latifah, and went on to host such events as "Mamma Mia! Mother's Day with the Music of ABBA", working with Ben Folds, "Gospel Night" in its 25th anniversary with Floyd and the Boston Pops Gospel Choir; Leslie Odom Jr. in his orchestral debut after starring in Hamilton: An American Musical; performing a tribute to The Beatles with Larry "Cha-Chi" Loprete as the host; "Parting with The B-52s", and giving the world-premiere of Sondheim on Sondheim with Philip Boykin, Carmen Cusak, Gabriel Ebert, and Lisa Howard as the vocalists.

==== 2018: "Celebrating Leonard Bernstein's Centennial" (May 9–June 16, 2018) ====
The 2018 Spring Season was announced on Monday, February 26, 2018, and featured a season-long celebration and tribute to Leonard Bernstein's centennial.

During the 2018 Pops Spring season, the orchestra worked with both Leslie Odom Jr. and Andy Grammer (who was the Opening Night headliner) for the second time after successful Fourth of July performances, as well as Sutton Foster again, who performed "A Broadway Celebration" with the orchestra. Some highlights of the season were the return of Laureate Conductor and legendary film composer John Williams for his annual "Film Night" appearances, in addition to an Opening Night salute to Leonard Bernstein for the occasion of Bernstein's centennial later that year. In addition to celebrating Bernstein's centennial, the orchestra presented concert versions of both On The Town and "West Side Story In Concert". They "Danced to the Movies", and were joined by tenor Alfie Boe who "Rocked the Pops" with them. The Pops were joined by Ashley Brown, Josh Strickland, Alton Fitzgerald White and Merle Dandridge to perform beloved songs from 9 Tony Award-winning and Academy Award-winning scores to "Disney's Broadway Hits". The orchestra also performed "The Best of the Boston Pops" Concerts, a series that hadn't been featured since 2013. The Pops performed their annual "Gospel Night" with the Boston Pops Gospel Choir and guest star Melinda Doolittle under the direction of Charles Floyd. The orchestra also welcomed back Leslie Odom Jr. with special guests Renée Elise Goldsberry and Phillipa Soo for "An Evening with Leslie Odom Jr".

==== 2019: "Boston Pops: It's a Party!" (May 8–June 15, 2019) ====
The 2019 Spring Season was announced on Monday, February 25, 2019, with the title "Boston Pops: It's A Party!"

Bernadette Peters was the Opening Night headliner, with the Pops performing a tribute to the 50th anniversary of the Apollo 11 Moon Landing, the world premiere of "From The Earth to the Moon and Beyond", a piece by composer James Beckel. May 9 was the annual Presidents At Pops fundraising gala held every year.

The orchestra performed the score to Star Wars: A New Hope in its entirety, live to picture on May 10 and 11 (both the 3 pm matinee and the 8 pm concert), and 14.

==== 2021: "Keith Lockhart's 25th Anniversary" (May 5–June 12, 2021) ====
The 2020 Spring Season was announced on Wednesday, February 26, 2020, with a special acknowledgement towards Lockhart's 25th anniversary as conductor. On April 8, the Boston Symphony Orchestra announced that their spring season would be postponed due to the global COVID-19 pandemic of early 2020–21. Keith Lockhart reassured patrons that the 2020 Spring Season would be performed the following year, although it would now be marking his 26th anniversary as conductor.

Opening Night 2021 was Wednesday, May 5 at 8 pm and featured "An Evening with Penn & Teller", to be repeated on Thursday, May 6 at 8 pm.

The Boston-based group Guster joined the orchestra on Friday, May 7 and Saturday, May 8 at 8 pm to continue their orchestral performances.

Star Wars: The Empire Strikes Back was shown Wednesday, May 12 at 8 pm, Thursday, May 13 at 8 pm, Saturday, May 15 at 3 pm and Saturday, May 22nd at 3 pm.

"Songs of America with Jon Meacham" was the program for Tuesday, May 18 at 8 pm (also Arthur Fiedler Night 2021) and Wednesday, May 19 at 8 pm. The Pops were joined by Meacham and the Tanglewood Festival Chorus, under the direction of James Burton for the first two of their four appearances that spring.

"Ragtime In Concert" was the next performance, for Thursday, May 20 at 8 pm, and Friday, May 21st at 8 pm.

"The Wonderful World of Alan Menken's Music" was the program for Wednesday, May 26 at 8 pm, Thursday May 27 at 8 pm, and Saturday, May 29 at 2 pm. The Pops were joined by Broadway actors Sierra Boggess, Telly Leung and Alton Fitzgerald White for these performances.

"Celebrating 25 with Keith!" was presented as special performances on Tuesday, June 1, Wednesday, June 2 and Thursday, June 3 all at 8 pm. The Pops special guests for the event were Megan Hilty and Jason Danieley.

"Danny Elfman's Music from the Films of Tim Burton" was performed on Friday, June 4 and Saturday, June 5, both at 8 pm. The Pops were conducted by Ted Sperling and were supposed to be joined by the Tanglewood Festival Chorus under the direction of James Burton, for the last two of their four appearances that spring.

"Star Wars: The Story in Music" was performed on Wednesday, June 9 at 8 pm.

"An Evening with Amanda Palmer, Neil Gaiman & The Boston Pops" was Thursday, June 10 and Friday, June 11, both at 8 pm. The Pops were joined by Palmer and Gaiman as special guests.

"Gospel Night" was Saturday, June 12 at 8 pm. The Pops were conducted by Charles Floyd, and Smokie Norful was the special guest.

=== Boston Pops Fireworks Spectacular (1974–2016) ===
The Boston Pops Fireworks Spectacular is annually performed by the Boston Pops Esplanade Orchestra on the banks of the Charles River at the Esplanade (sometimes referred to by locals as the "Oval") of the Hatch Memorial Shell in Boston, Massachusetts, every Fourth of July. It was made locally famous in 1974, during which local philanthropist David G. Mugar approached legendary Pops conductor Arthur Fiedler about adding cannons and fireworks during the performance of Pyotr Ilyich Tchaikovsky's famous "1812 Overture" as well as fireworks and confetti to end John Philip Sousa's march "The Stars and Stripes Forever". It was a success, and they repeated it in 1975 and 1976, when it was made nationally famous, and even earned a spot in the 1976 Guinness World Records for having the largest audience for a classical concert since the book's founding in 1955. It's grown since the Bicentennial, and has earned a place in local traditions ever since.

The program was broadcast on WCRB (99.5 FM Boston) on the radio from 1974 to 2016, and Bloomberg Radio from 2017 to present-day (2022), and was presented on television nationally (as "Pops Goes The Fourth") from 1993-2002 on A&E Network, 2002-2016 on CBS, and 2017-present on Bloomberg; locally from 1984 and 1987 on WGBH-TV; 1988 as part of the Evening at Pops series on PBS; 1993-2001 on WCVB-TV Channel 5; 2002-2016 on WBZ-TV (Channel 4); 2017-present on WHDH (TV) (Channel 7) in Boston and the greater-Boston metro area.

For the 2002 Fireworks Spectacular, the orchestra performed with Maureen McGovern, who paid tribute to the centennial of legendary and iconic Broadway composer Richard Rodgers by performing "My Favorite Things" (from The Sound of Music), and Barry Manilow, who paid tribute to and acknowledged the September 11 attacks when performing his 1976 hit "Weekend in New England."

For the 2005 Fireworks Spectacular, the orchestra performed with Big and Rich (who performed their hit "Love Train"), Gretchen Wilson, and Cowboy Troy (who performed with Big and Rich for a new rendition of the Declaration of Independence), and highlighted their newest CD America by performing "The Star-Spangled Banner", "Armed Forces Salute", "This Is My Country", "The Gettysburg Address" (narrated by then-WBZ-TV news anchor Jack Williams), "Doodletown Fifers" (performed with the Middlesex County Volunteers Fifes & Drums), "God Bless America", "Boogie Woogie Bugle Boy", the "Main Title" (from Revenge of the Sith), Tchaikovsky's famous "1812 Overture", and Sousa's classic march, "The Stars and Stripes Forever".

For the 2006 Fireworks Spectacular, the orchestra performed with Aerosmith, who performed "Dream On" and "I Don't Want to Miss a Thing". American Idol contestant Ayla Brown performed the national anthem.

For the 2008 Fireworks Spectacular, the orchestra performed with Rascal Flatts, who performed "Life Is A Highway" and "Every Day".

For the 2009 Fireworks Spectacular, the orchestra performed with Neil Diamond, who performed "Sweet Caroline", "Forever in Blue Jeans", "Cracklin' Rosie", and "America".

During the 2010 Fireworks Spectacular, the orchestra celebrated its 125th season and the Hatch Shell celebrated its 100th anniversary. The orchestra performed with Toby Keith, who performed "Courtesy of the Red, White and Blue" and "American Soldier". They also performed with the Tanglewood Festival Chorus, soprano Renese King (who sang "We the People" (the theme song for Visions of America), and they performed "The Dream Lives On: A Portrait of the Kennedy Brothers", with Lisa Hughes, Jack Williams, and local actors Jeremiah Kissel and Will LeBow. The Pops specifically commissioned the piece by Peter Boyer and Lynn Ahrens to be used during their 125th season.

For the 2014 Fireworks Spectacular, the orchestra performed with actors Julia Udine and Ben Jacoby from the 2014 U.S. touring production of Andrew Lloyd Webber's musical The Phantom of the Opera, and The Beach Boys, who performed "Fun, Fun, Fun", "Good Vibrations", and "Surfin' USA".

For the 2015 Fireworks Spectacular, Lockhart and the Pops performed with Michael Cavanaugh who sang some of Billy Joel's classic songs, the Boston-based band Sons of Serendip, the Boston Crusaders Drum and Bugle Corps (who performed the entirety of their 2015 Field Show, Animal Farm; based on George Orwell's 1945 novella of the same name) and members of the USO's Show Troupe.

For the 2016 Fireworks Spectacular, Lockhart and the Pops performed with pop stars Demi Lovato, Nick Jonas (both performing on their joint world tour the Future Now Tour), and Grammy- and CMA-winning country music stars Little Big Town who performed the national anthem. The 2016 Fireworks Spectacular also marked David Mugar's final Fireworks Spectacular show, which he produced for over 40 years.

=== Boston Pops Fireworks Spectacular (2016–present) ===
In October 2016, the Boston Pops agreed to take over the management of the annual July Fourth fireworks concert on the Esplanade and to take on the responsibility for finding a corporate sponsor for the $2 million cost. On March 7, 2017, it was announced that Eaton Vance and Bloomberg L.P. had been signed on as sponsors of the concert under a three-year deal, and that the telecast of the event would move from WBZ-TV/CBS to Bloomberg Television.

For the 2017 Fireworks Spectacular, Lockhart and the Pops performed with actor Leslie Odom Jr. (of Hamilton: An American Musical fame), 1990s pop singer Melissa Etheridge, and pop singer Andy Grammer, in addition to the United States Army Field Band's Concert Band and Soldiers' Chorus.

For the 2018 Fireworks Spectacular, the orchestra worked with Rachel Platten, Rhiannon Giddens, the Indigo Girls, actresses Rita Moreno and Natalie Cortez (who was about to open in the ensemble in the world premiere of Moulin Rouge!, which debuted in Boston in October 2018 and later debuted on Broadway in 2019), and the Tanglewood Festival Chorus under the direction of James Burton. In addition to Bloomberg nationwide, the show was carried by independent station WHDH (channel 7) locally over-the-air, and online at Boston.com, BostonGlobe.com, bso.org (the Boston Symphony Orchestra's website), and on the Boston Pops Fireworks Spectacular app.

For the 2019 Fireworks Spectacular, Lockhart and the Pops paid tribute to the 50th anniversary of Woodstock by performing both a medley of the Theme and "Pinball Wizard" from The Who's Tommy and a medley of "Aquarius" and "The Flesh Failures (Let The Sunshine In)" from Hair. Lockhart and the Pops also performed with Queen Latifah, folk legend Arlo Guthrie (who paid tribute to his father Woody Guthrie by performing "This Land Is Your Land"), poet Amanda Gorman, two acts from America's Got Talent, The Texas Tenors and Amanda Mena, and the United States Navy Band's Sea Chanters Chorus.

The 2020 Fireworks Spectacular was canceled on May 8, 2020, due to the ongoing global COVID-19 pandemic of 2020. In its place, the Pops decided to present "A Boston Pops Salute to Our Heroes" on July 4, with the only option for broadcasting it being on television, radio and digital media.

The 2021 Fireworks Spectacular was announced on June 11, 2021. Due to the fact it typically takes 10 weeks to plan, it was decided to split the show into two portions. The musical portion would take place at Tanglewood and broadcast live on-air and internet stream while the fireworks would take place on the Boston Common. The guest artists were Mavis Staples and Jon Batiste (headliners), the Six-String Soldiers of the United States Army Field Band, the Singing Sergeants of the United States Air Force Band.

The 2022 Fireworks Spectacular was announced on May 26, 2022, with the announcements that the event would be returning in full to the Massachusetts Department of Conservation and Recreation Hatch Shell after a 2-year absence in addition to the selection of guest artists being announced at a later date. Additionally, the orchestra also announced a slew of tributes, a world premiere and a show of solidarity with Ukraine, by performing its State Anthem. The guest artists were announced on June 13, 2022, and were revealed to be Chaka Khan (as the headliner), Broadway actress Heather Headley, and The Voice (American TV Series) season one winner Javier Colon. The Tanglewood Festival Chorus (under the direction of James Burton) and the Middlesex County Volunteers Fifes & Drums Corps. would be joining the Pops as well. The orchestra performed moving tributes to the late Stephen Sondheim (as he died in November of 2021) ("A Comedy Tonight" from both the musical and film of A Funny Thing Happened On The Way To The Forum, "Our Time" from Merrily We Roll Along and "Children Will Listen" from Into The Woods), and Judy Garland (to celebrate her centennial), and world premiered a new work, "Those Heroes Who Healed The Nation" by Julius P. Williams.

The 2023 Fireworks Spectacular was announced on May 26, 2023. En Vogue will headline the Boston July 4 fireworks celebration, joining Keith Lockhart and the Boston Pops at the Hatch Shell. The award-winning R&B group behind popular 80's hits like “Free Your Mind” and “My Lovin’ (You’re Never Gonna Get It)” is the marquee entertainment at this year’s Fourth of July celebration. Also taking the Hatch Shell stage are Broadway star Mandy Gonzalez (“In the Heights”), country duo LoCash, and a trio of Broadway performers — Alton Fitzgerald White, Elizabeth Stanley and Andrea Jones-Sojola — who participated in the Pops’ concert presentation of “Ragtime: The Symphonic Concert.”

=== Holiday Pops (1973–present) ===
Beginning in December 1973, Arthur Fiedler and the Pops started an occasional tradition at Symphony Hall, which after a few years, became a yearly staple of the winter season in Boston—their Christmas concerts, which became known regionally and locally as Holiday Pops.

Once Fiedler died in 1979, John Williams continued the tradition as conductor from 1980 until 1993. After two years of guest conductors while the BSO were interviewing their next permanent conductor, Keith Lockhart led his first Holiday Pops concert in December 1995. In addition to performing approximately between 40 and 42 each December, the Pops also began performing on New Year's Eve during Lockhart's tenure.

The Holiday Pops 2014 season ran from Wednesday, December 3, 2014, through Wednesday, December 24, 2014, with a movie shown Friday and Saturday, December 26–27, 2014, and the New Year's Eve concert happening on Wednesday, December 31, 2014.

2014 was the year that the Pops began showing popular Christmas movies after their 40- or 42-concert season was over. The first movie chosen was Home Alone. The score, written by the laureate conductor Williams, was performed live by the orchestra, accompanying the film. The New Year's Eve concert was performed by the Boston Pops Swing Orchestra, led by bandleader Bo Winiker.

2015 was a significant year, because John Oliver, longtime conductor of the Tanglewood Festival Chorus had retired at the end of the Tanglewood season that summer.

The Holiday Pops 2016 season ran from Wednesday, November 30, 2016, through Saturday, December 24, 2016, with a movie shown Friday and Saturday, December 30–31, 2016, and the New Year's Eve concert happening on Saturday, December 31, 2016.

The second movie chosen was Back to the Future. The score, written by Alan Silvestri, was once again performed live by the orchestra, in sync with the film. The New Year's Eve concert was performed by the Boston Pops Swing Orchestra, once again led by bandleader Bo Winiker.

2016 was a significant year, because it was the first time in the history of the series of "Holiday Pops" concerts that the Tanglewood Festival Chorus performed without a conductor.

2017 was a significant year, because the BSO had chosen to replace John Oliver as the conductor of the Tanglewood Festival Chorus, and he would begin conducting the chorus that year.

The Holiday Pops 2017 season ran from Tuesday, December 5, 2017, through Sunday, December 24, 2017, with the New Year's Eve concert happening on Sunday, December 31, 2017. There was no movie chosen for that year.

The New Year's Eve concert was performed by the Boston Pops Swing Orchestra.

The Holiday Pops 2018 season ran from Thursday, December 6, 2018, through Monday, December 24, 2018, with a movie shown Saturday and Sunday, December 29–30, 2018, and the New Year's Eve concert happening on Monday, December 31, 2018.

The third movie chosen was Home Alone once again. Billed as Home Alone In Concert, the score, written by Williams, was once more performed live by the orchestra, accompanying the film. The New Year's Eve concert was performed by the Boston Pops Swing Orchestra and special guest Seth MacFarlane.

The Holiday Pops 2019 season ran from Wednesday, December 4, 2019, through Tuesday, December 24, 2019, with a movie shown Saturday and Sunday, December 28–29, 2019, and the New Year's Eve concert happening on Tuesday, December 31, 2019.

The fourth movie chosen was Bugs Bunny At The Symphony. The score, written by Carl Stalling, was performed live by the orchestra, accompanying the film. The New Year's Eve concert was performed by the Boston Pops Swing Orchestra and special guest The Hot Sardines.

The Pops introduced a Sensory friendly concert for the first time on Saturday, December 7, 2019. The concert was designed and aimed at all families with children or adults diagnosed with an autism spectrum disorder or sensory sensitivities.

=== "A Visit from St. Nicholas" celebrity narrators ===
Over the course of Lockhart's quarter-century tenure, there have been numerous celebrity narrators who have joined the orchestra to recite Clement C. Moore's classic poem, arranged by Joseph Reisman. These narrators have included the likes of comedian Jimmy Tingle (2005); singer Amanda Palmer (2009); New Jersey governor Chris Christie (during the Pops' tour of Newark on December 5, 2010); Greg Kretschmar (December 18, 2011); Boston Bruins forward Shawn Thorton (2012); Casey Affleck (2014); newswoman Janet Wu (December 16, 2014, and December 12, 2018); then senator-elect Elizabeth Warren (2015); former baseball player and then-manager of the Boston Red Sox Alex Cora (who made history by reading the poem in Spanish for the first time in 2018); Massachusetts governor Charlie Baker (December 7, 2016, who announced that Lockhart would be a recipient of the 2017 Massachusetts Commonwealth Award); Matt Seigel (host of the Kiss 108 morning radio program "Matty In The Morning"; December 15, 2018); WBZ news anchor Lisa Hughes (December 11, 2017 & December 10, 2019); and WCVB Channel 5 news anchors Ed Harding and Maria Stephanos (December 10, 2016 & December 8, 2019).

=== "Sleigh Ride" celebrity guest conductors ===
Over the course of Lockhart's quarter-century tenure, there have been numerous celebrity conductors who have joined the orchestra to lead them in Leroy Anderson's famous composition. These conductors have included the likes of then-Boston Celtics center Shaquille O'Neal (2010), then-Massachusetts governor elect Charlie Baker (2014), retired Boston Red Sox second baseman and NESN sportscaster Jerry Remy (2018), and then-Boston Celtics center Tacko Fall (2019), who became the tallest person to ever stand on the Symphony Hall podium.

== POPSearch ==
POPSearch is the Boston Pops' nationwide talent competition that offers amateur singers the chance to perform with the orchestra at Boston's Fourth of July Extravaganza, as well as on the orchestra's national tour. The winner also receives a cash prize. The American Idol–style competition has expanded into a nationwide contest through video submissions on YouTube and voting through BostonPops.org.

Tracy Silva, a mother of two from Taunton, Massachusetts, and van driver for special needs children, won the inaugural POPSearch contest in 2004.

Frances Botelho-Hoeg, an elementary school principal from Kingston, Massachusetts, was knocked out in the second round of the inaugural POPSearch, but returned in 2005 to sweep the competition.

The POPSearch 2007 grand champion Maria Perry won $5,000 and performed with the Boston Pops on July 3 and 4 in the annual July 4 Extravaganza seen by a live audience of almost a half-million people on the Charles River Esplanade and several million more on WBZ-TV.

== High School Sing-Off ==
In the early spring of 2008, Keith Lockhart announced the "Boston Pops High School Sing-Off—A Best of Broadway Challenge", the first Boston Pops musical theater competition for Massachusetts high school students. Students from high schools throughout Massachusetts were encouraged to submit audition videos of musical theater vocal works for solo, duet, trio, quartet, or quintet to the Boston Pops before May 9, 2008. The winner was featured in the Fourth of July concert on the Esplanade.

== Music directors and conductors ==
- 1885; 1887–1889: Adolf Neuendorff
- 1886: John C. Mullaly
- 1887: Wilhelm Rietzel
- 1888: Franz Kneisel
- 1891: Eugen Gurenberg
- 1891–1894; 1903–1907: Timothee Adamowski
- 1895: Antonio de Novellis
- 1896–1902; 1906–1907: Max Zach
- 1897: Leo Schulz
- 1908–1909: Arthur Kautzenbach
- 1909–1917: André Maquarre
- 1913–1916: Clement Lenom
- 1913–1916: Otto Urach
- 1915–1916: Ernst Schmidt
- 1916: Josef Pasternack
- 1917–1926: Agide Jacchia
- 1927–1929: Alfredo Casella
- 1930–1979: Arthur Fiedler
- 1955–1999: Harry Ellis Dickson (Associate Conductor)
- 1980–1993: John Williams (Laureate Conductor, 1994–present)
- 1995–present: Keith Lockhart
- 2002–2006: Bruce Hangen (Principal Guest Conductor)

== See also ==
- Pops orchestra
