= Bernard Haitink discography =

The conductor Bernard Haitink recorded works, especially symphonies and other orchestral works, with different orchestras. He made recordings for several labels, including Philips Records, EMI Classics, Columbia Records, LSO Live, RCO Live, and CSO Resound.

Bavarian Radio Symphony Orchestra:

- Ludwig van Beethoven
  - Missa Solemnis (BR-Klassik, 2014)
  - Symphony No. 9 (BR Klassik, 2019)
- Johannes Brahms
  - Altrhapsodie, Nänie, Gesang Der Parzen and Begräbnisgesang (Orfeo, 1982)
- Anton Bruckner
  - Symphony No. 4 (BR-Klassik, 2012)
  - Symphony No. 5 (BR-Klassik, 2010)
  - Symphony No. 6 (BR-Klassik, 2017)
  - Symphony No. 7 (BR-Klassik, 1981)
  - Symphony No. 8 (BR-Klassik, 1993)
  - Te Deum (BR-Klassik, 2010)
- Antonin Dvorak
  - Symphony No.7 & Scherzo capriccioso (BR-Klassik, 1981)
- Joseph Haydn
  - The Seasons (BR-Klassik, 1997)
  - The Creation (BR-Klassik, 2013)
- Gustav Mahler
  - Symphony No. 3 (BR-Klassik, 2016)
  - Symphony No. 4 (BR-Klassik, 2005)
  - Symphony No. 7 (BR-Klassik, 2011)
  - Symphony No. 9 (BR-Klassik, 2011)
- Wolfgang Amadeus Mozart
  - Die Zauberflote (EMI, 1981)
- Dmitri Shostakovich
  - Symphony No. 8 (BR-Klassik, 2006)
  - Symphony No. 15 (BR-Klassik, 2015)
- Richard Strauss
  - Daphne (EMI, 1983)
  - Don Quixote (Sony, 2014)
- Richard Wagner
  - Tannhauser (EMI, 1985)
  - Der Ring des Nibelungen (EMI, 1989-1991)

Berliner Philharmoniker

- Béla Bartók
  - Bluebeard's Castle (EMI, 1996)
- Anton Bruckner
  - Symphony No. 4 (2014)
  - Symphony No. 5 (2011)
- Gustav Mahler
  - Symphonies No. 1-7, 9 (Philips, 1987-1996)
- Igor Stravinsky
  - Rite of Spring, Firebird, Petrushka, Pulcinella (Philips)

Boston Symphony Orchestra (Principal Guest conductor from 1995 to 2004)

- Johannes Brahms
  - Symphony No. 1 and Nanie with the Tanglewood Festival Chorus (Philips, 1994)
  - Symphony No. 2 and Tragic Overture (Philips, 1990)
  - Symphony No. 3 and Alto Rhapsody, with Jard Van Nes and the Tanglewood Festival Chorus (Philips, 1993)
  - Symphony No. 4 and St Anthony Variations (Philips, 1992)
  - Piano Concerto No. 2 with Emanuel Ax (Sony, 1997)
- Maurice Ravel
  - Daphnis and Chloe, with Tanglewood Festival Chorus (Philips, 1989)
  - Ma Mère l'oye, Menuet antique, Rapsodie espagnole, La Valse (Philips, 1995)
  - Alborada del Gracioso, Bolero, Le tombeau de Couperin, Valses nobles et sentimentales (Philips, 1996)

Chicago Symphony Orchestra (Principal conductor from 2007 to 2010). All recordings produced by CSO Resound, the in-house record label for the Chicago Symphony Orchestra.

- Anton Bruckner
  - Symphony No. 7 (2007)
- Gustav Mahler
  - Symphony No. 1 (2008)
  - Symphony No. 2 (2009)
  - Symphony No. 3 (2007) (2007)
  - Symphony No. 6 (2008)
- Francis Poulenc
  - Gloria (2007)
- Maurice Ravel
  - Daphnis et Chloe Ballet (complete) (2007)
- Dmitri Shostakovich:
  - Symphony No. 4 (2008)
- Richard Strauss:
  - Ein Heldenleben (with Anton Webern: Im Sommerwind) (2010)

Glyndebourne Festival Opera (Music director from 1978 to 1988)

- Wolfgang Amadeus Mozart
  - Don Giovanni (EMI, 1984) with the London Philharmonic Orchestra
  - Cosi fan Tutte (EMI, 1987) with the London Philharmonic Orchestra
  - Le Nozze di Figaro (EMI, 1984) with the London Philharmonic Orchestra
- Giuseppe Verdi
  - La Traviata (VHS)

Lamoureux Orchestra

- Wolfgang Amadeus Mozart
  - Violin Concerto No. 1 with David Oistrakh, violin (Philips, 1963)
- Igor Stravinsky
  - Violin Concerto in D with David, Oistrakh, violin (Philips, 1963)

London Philharmonic Orchestra (Chief conductor from 1967 to 1979)

- Ludwig van Beethoven
  - Symphonies No. 1-9 (Philips, 1976)
  - Piano Concertos No. 1–5 and Choral Fantasy, with Alfred Brendel (Philips)
  - Triple Concerto with the Beaux Arts Trio (Philips)
- Benjamin Britten
  - Our Hunting Fathers (Live recording in 1979, released in 2005 on LPO Ltd. label)
- Antonin Dvorak
  - Cello Concerto with Maurice Gendron, cello - (Philips, 1967)
  - Rondo in G minor (Philips, 1967)
- Edward Elgar
  - Enigma Variations (Live recording in 1986, released in 2005 on LPO Ltd. label)
  - Introduction and Allegro for String Quartet and String Orchestra (Live recording in 1984, released in 2005 on LPO Ltd. label)
- Gustav Holst
  - The Planets (Philips, 1970)
- Franz Liszt
  - Complete Symphonic Poems (Philips, 1968-1971)
- Felix Mendelssohn Bartholdy
  - Symphonies No. 1-5, Overtures (Philips)
- Nikolai Rimsky-Korsakov
  - Scheherazade with Rodney Friend, violin – (Philips, 1970s)
- Dmitri Shostakovich
  - Symphony No. 1 (Decca, 1980)
  - Symphony No. 2 (Decca, 1981)
  - Symphony No. 3 (Decca, 1981)
  - Symphony No. 4 (Decca, 1979)
  - Symphony No. 7 (Decca, 1979)
  - Symphony No. 9 (Decca, 1980)
  - Symphony No. 10 (Decca, 1977)
  - Symphony No. 10 (Live Recording in 1986, released 2009 on LPO Ltd. label)
  - The Age of Gold Suite (Decca, 1979)
- Richard Strauss
  - Don Juan (LPO, 2014)
  - Ein Heldenleben (LPO, 2014)
- Igor Stravinsky
  - Petrushka (1911 version) (1973)
  - The Firebird Ballet (1973)
  - The Rite of Spring (1973)
- Ralph Vaughan Williams recorded on EMI
  - Symphony No. 1 (1989)
  - Symphony No. 2 (1986)
    - Fantasia on a Theme by Thomas Tallis
  - Symphony No. 3 (1996)
  - Symphony No. 4 (1996)
  - Symphony No. 5 (1994) (Live version on LPO LTD label also available)
    - Norfolk Rhapsody No. 1
    - The Lark Ascending
  - Symphony No. 6 (1997)
    - In the Fen Country
    - On Wenlock Edge
  - Symphony No. 7 (1984) (Live version on LPO LTD label also available)
  - Symphony No. 8 (2000)
  - Symphony No. 9 (2000)
- Various: Glyndebourne Festival Opera: a Gala Evening (Arthaus DVD, 1992)

London Symphony Orchestra: All recordings produced by LSO Live label, the in-house record label for the London Symphony Orchestra.

- Ludwig van Beethoven:
  - Symphony No. 1 (2006)
  - Symphony No. 2 (2005)
  - Symphony No. 3 & Leonore Overture No. 2 (2005)
  - Symphony No. 4 (2006)
  - Symphony No. 5 (2006)
  - Symphony No. 6 & Triple Concerto (2005)
  - Symphony No. 7 (2005)
  - Symphony No. 8 (2006)
  - Symphony No. 9 (2006)
- Johannes Brahms
  - Symphony No. 1 & Serenade No. 2 (2003)
  - Symphony No. 2 & Double Concerto & Tragic Overture (2003)
  - Symphony No. 3 (2004)
  - Symphony No. 4 (2004)
- Anton Bruckner:
  - Symphony No. 4 (2011)
  - Symphony No. 9 (2013)
- Richard Strauss
  - Eine Alpensinfonie (2008)

Orchestre National de L'Opera de Monte-Carlo

- Gabriel Faure
  - Elegie (Philips, 1969)
- Camille Saint-Saens
  - Cello Concerto No.1 with Maurice Gendron cello (Philips, 1969)

Philharmonia Orchestra, London

- Edward Elgar
  - Pomp and Circumstance March No. 5 (EMI, 1986)
  - Symphony No. 1 (EMI, 1983)
  - Symphony No. 2 (EMI, 1984)
- William Walton
  - Symphony No. 1 (EMI, 1981)

Radio Filharmonisch Orkest (Chief conductor from 1957 to 1961)

- Hector Berlioz
  - La Damnation de Faust (Challenge Records, 1996)
- Anton Bruckner
  - Symphony No. 7 (Challenge Records, 2019–21)
- Wolfgang Amadeus Mozart
  - Die Zauberflote (Myrto, 1958)

Rotterdam Philharmonic Orchestra

- Gustav Mahler
  - Symphony No. 2 (RPhO 1991)

Royal Concertgebouw Orchestra (Chief conductor from 1961 to 1988)

- Béla Bartók
  - Concerto for Orchestra (Philips, 1961)
  - Dance Suite (Philips, 1961)
  - Music For Strings, Percussion, And Celesta (Philips, 1970)
  - Violin Concerto No. 2 with Henryk Szeryng (Philips, 1970)
  - Rhapsody No. 1 with Henryk Szeryng (Philips, 1970)
- Ludwig van Beethoven
  - Symphonies No. 1-9 (Philips, 1988)
  - Violin Romance No. 1 and 2 with Arthur Grumiaux (Philips, 1966)
  - Violin Concerto with Henryk Szeryng (Philips, 1971)
  - Violin Concerto with Herman Krebbers (Philips, 1975)
  - Piano Concertos with Claudio Arrau (Philips, 1964-1965)
  - Piano Concertos with Murray Perahia (CBS, 1983-1986)
- Georges Bizet
  - Symphony in C
  - Jeux d'enfants
- Johannes Brahms
  - Symphonies No. 1–4 (Philips)
  - Double Concerto with Henryk Szeryng and Janos Starker (Philips, 1971)
  - Piano Concertos No. 1–2 with Claudio Arrau (Philips)
  - Piano Concerto No. 1 with Vladimir Ashkenazy (Decca)
  - Piano Concerto No. 1 with Emmanuel Ax (RCO Live)
  - Violin Concerto with Frank Peter Zimmermann (RCO Live)
- Max Bruch
  - Violin Concerto with Itzhak Perlman (EMI, 1983-1984)
- Anton Bruckner - all on Philips Records, unless otherwise noted
  - Symphony No. 0 (1966)
  - Symphony No. 1 (1972)
  - Symphony No. 2 (1969)
  - Symphony No. 3 (1963)
  - Symphony No. 4 (1965)
  - Symphony No. 5 (1971)
  - Symphony No. 6 (1970)
  - Symphony No. 7 (1966), (1979)
  - Symphony No. 8 (1960), (1981), (RCO Live, 2005)
  - Symphony No. 9 (1965), (1981)
- Claude Debussy
  - Dance for Harp and String Orchestra (1977)
  - Images for Orchestra (1977)
  - Jeux (1979)
  - La Mer (1976)
  - Marche ecossaise (1976)
  - Nocturnes (3) (1979)
  - Prelude a l'apres-midi d'un faune (1976)
  - rhapsodie for clarinet and orchestra (1976)
- Alphons Diepenbrock
  - Elektra, Symphonic Suite (Donemus, 1958)
- Antonin Dvorak
  - Symphony No. 7 (Philips, 1960)
  - Slavonic Dances no. 1,3,7 And 8 (Philips, 1960)
  - Symphony No. 8 (Philips, 1963)
  - Slavonic Dances No. 2-4-6 (Philips, 1963)
- Zoltan Kodaly
  - Hary Janos Orchestral Suite (Philips, 1970)
- Gustav Mahler all on Philips Records, unless otherwise noted
  - Symphony No. 1 (1962)
  - Symphony No. 2 (1968)
  - Symphony No. 3 (1966)
  - Symphony No. 4 (1967), (RCO Live, 2006)
  - Symphony No. 5 (1970)
  - Symphony No. 6 (1969)
  - Symphony No. 7 (1969)
  - Symphony No. 8 (1971)
  - Symphony No. 9 (1969)
  - Adagio from Symphony No. 10 (1971)
  - Symphonies No. 1–5, 7, 9 (live recordings Kerstmatinee/Christmas Matinee; Philips, 1977-1987)
- Frank Martin (Preludio)
  - Cello Concerto (1970)
  - The Four Elements (1965)
- Felix Mendelssohn Bartholdy
  - A Midsummer Night's Dream (Philips)
  - Violin Concerto with Arthur Grumiaux (Philips)
  - Violin Concerto with Itzhak Perlman (EMI, 1983-1984)
- Sergei Prokofiev
  - Peter and the Wolf (Philips, 1969)
- Sergei Rachmaninov
  - Piano Concertos Nos. 1-4 with Vladimir Ashkenazy (1986-1987)
- Maurice Ravel
  - Alborado del gracioso (1971)
  - Bolero (1975)
  - La Valse (1975)
  - Le Tombeau de Couperin (1975)
  - Pavane pour une infante defunte (1976)
  - rhapsodie espagnol (1973)
  - Daphnis et Chloé Suites and Ma mère l'oye (remastered Pentatone)
- Franz Schubert (Philips)
  - Rosamunde Incidental Music (1965)
  - Symphony No. 8 (1975)
  - Symphony No. 9
- Robert Schumann (Philips)
  - Genoveva Overture (1984)
  - Manfred Overture (1983)
  - Symphony No. 1 (1983)
  - Symphony No. 2 (1984)
  - Symphony No. 3 (1981)
  - Symphony No. 4 (1984)
- Dmitri Shostakovich - released on Decca unless otherwise noted.
  - From Jewish Folk Poetry (1983)
  - Overture on Russian and Kirghiz Folk Themes (1982)
  - Six Poems of Marina Tsvetaeva (1982)
  - Symphony No. 5 (1981)
  - Symphony No. 6 (1983)
  - Symphony No. 8 (1982)
  - Symphony No. 11 (1983)
  - Symphony No. 12 (1982)
  - Symphony No. 13 (1984)
  - Symphony No. 14 (1980)
  - Symphony No. 15 (RCO Live, 2012).
- Pyotr Ilyich Tchaikovsky (Philips)
  - 1812 Overture (1972)
  - Capriccio Italien (1961)
  - Francesca di Rimini (1972)
  - Manfred Symphony (1979)
  - Marche Slave (1972)
  - Romeo & Juliet Fantasy Overture (1964)
  - Symphony No. 1 (1979)
  - Symphony No. 2 (1977)
  - Symphony No. 3 (1979)
  - Symphony No. 4 (1978)
  - Symphony No. 5 (1974)
  - Symphony No. 6 (1978)
  - The Storm (1977)
- Peter Schat
  - Symphony no. 2 (Donemus, 1986)
- Richard Strauss
  - Ein Heldenleben (Philips, 1970)
  - Also Sprach Zarathustra and Don Juan (Philips, 1973)
  - Don Juan (Philips, 1981)
  - Don Quichote with Tibor de Machula (Philips, 1979)
  - Tod Und Verklärung (Philips, 1981)
  - Till Eulenspiegel (Philips, 1981)
  - Eine Alpensinfonie (Philips, 1985)
- The Radio Recordings box, published by Radio Netherlands
- Symphony Edition box set of RCO recordings of Beethoven, Brahms, Bruckner, Mahler, Schumann, Tchaikovsky (36 CDs – Decca, 2014)

Staatskapelle Dresden (Chief conductor from 2002 to 2004) - Most recordings released by Profil (Hanssler Classics) unless otherwise noted.

- Ludwig van Beethoven
  - Fidelio (1990)
  - Piano Concertos Nos. 1-5 with Andras Schiff (Teldec)
  - Violin Concerto with Frank Peter Zimmermann (2002)
- Johannes Brahms
  - Symphony No. 1 (2002)
- Anton Bruckner
  - Symphony No. 6 (2003)
  - Symphony No. 8 (2002)
- Gustav Mahler
  - Symphony No. 2 Resurrection (1995)
- Wolfgang Amadeus Mozart
  - Requiem Mass (Philips, 1982)
  - Symphony No. 38 (2002)
- Carl Maria von Weber
  - Oberon Overture (Profil)
- Richard Strauss
  - Der Rosenkavalier (EMI)

The Royal Opera, Covent Garden (Music director from 1987 to 2002)

- Benjamin Britten
  - Peter Grimes (EMI, 1993)
- Leos Janacek
  - Jenufa (Wagner, 2002)
- Giuseppe Verdi
  - Don Carlos (EMI, 1997)

Wiener Philharmoniker

- Johannes Brahms:
  - Ein Deutsches Requiem (Philips, 1990)
  - Piano Concerto No. 2 with Vladimir Ashkenazy (Decca, 1982)
- Anton Bruckner:
  - Symphony No. 3 (Philips, 1988)
  - Symphony No. 4 (Philips, 1985)
  - Symphony No. 5 (Philips, 1988)
  - Symphony No. 8 (Philips, 1995)
  - Te Deum (Philips, 1988)
  - Symphony No. 7 (last concert DVD 2019)
