= POPSearch =

POPSearch is the Boston Pops' nationwide talent competition that offers amateur singers the chance to perform with the orchestra at Boston's Fourth of July Extravaganza, as well as on the orchestra's national tour. The winner also receives a $5,000 cash prize. In its third year, the American Idol-style competition has expanded into a nationwide contest through video submissions on YouTube.com and voting through BostonPops.org. Deadline for applications is May 23. This year's competition opened on May 9, and the winner will be announced at the Boston Pops concert on June 28.

== The POPSearch process ==
Singers may audition for POPSearch 2007 in any one of three ways: by posting a two-minute performance video on YouTube; by sending a two-minute audition video or by going to Symphony Hall to tape a live audition. On May 29, the top 16 POPSearch contestants selected by conductor Keith Lockhart and the Boston Pops artistic staff will be announced, and their video auditions will be posted online on the POPSearch YouTube site. From May 29 to June 28, music lovers from across the country will be invited to vote for their favorite POPSearch contestants at www.bostonpops.org. Online voting results will be combined with votes from Keith Lockhart, a panel of judges, members of the Boston Pops, and the Symphony Hall audience at a special POPSearch concerts hosted by Keith Lockhart, where the contestants will perform with the Boston Pops rhythm section.

The final round of POPSearch will take place during the June 28 Boston Pops concert at Symphony Hall, when the three finalists will perform with the entire orchestra for the first time in the competition. Online votes and live voting at Symphony Hall will be combined to determine the POPSearch 2007 winner. The POPSearch 2007 grand champion wins $5,000 and the opportunity to perform with the Boston Pops on July 3 and 4 in the annual July 4 Extravaganza seen by a live audience of almost a half-million people on the Charles River Esplanade and several million more on WBZ-TV.

== Past POPSearch Winners ==
Tracy Silva, a mother of two from Taunton, Mass., and van driver for special-needs children, won the inaugural POPSearch contest in 2004, wowing judges with her soulful rendition of "Fools Fall in Love" from the hit Broadway musical Smokey Joe's Cafe. She beat out more than 700 contestants from across New England for the chance to perform "Your Daddy's Son" from the musical Ragtime with Mr. Lockhart and the Boston Pops at the orchestra's marquis event: the annual July 4 Extravaganza. Ms. Silva has since sung with the Pops as a guest soloist three times in 2005 and 2006, in addition to performances at Boston Red Sox and New England Patriots games, at the Democratic National Convention, and as the opening act for Broadway star Maureen McGovern.

Frances Botelho-Hoeg, an elementary school principal from Kingston, Mass., was knocked out in the second round of the inaugural POPSearch, but returned in 2005 to sweep the competition by singing "When You're Good to Mama" from the Tony Award-winning Broadway musical Chicago. Ms. Botelho-Hoeg performed with the Pops on July 4 and traveled with America's Orchestra that summer on a national tour that included stops in Philadelphia and Washington, D.C. Ms. Botelho-Hoeg has since performed with the Plymouth Symphony and at such local events as Bunker Hill Community College's commencement.

Finalists in 2004 and 2005 included Wayne Hobbs, a bank vice-president from Vergennes, Vt. (2004); Ellen O'Brien, a sales representative from Winthrop, Mass. (2005); Kathy Porter, a marketing manager and grandmother from Braintree, Mass. (2004); and Joseph Rucker Jr., a social worker from Brockton, Mass. (2005).
