= Cleanshave =

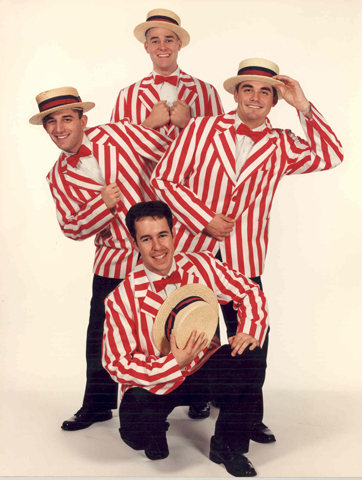
- Country: United States
- Branch: United States Navy
- Type: Barbershop quartet
- Role: Public duties
- Size: 4
- Part of: United States Naval Academy Glee Club
- Garrison/HQ: United States Naval Academy

Cleanshave performing in 2004 in The Villages, Florida (sample)

Cleanshave is a barbershop quartet maintained by the United States Naval Academy in Annapolis, Maryland, and staffed by midshipmen.

According to the United States Navy, Cleanshave was established in the late 1950s to perform the "distinctly American music style" of barbershop with its repertoire encompassing "popular songs of the gaslight era and the early twentieth century".

Once accepted to the four-person ensemble, a midshipman remains with it for the rest of his academy career. The unit-specific uniform consists of candy stripe blazers, red bowties, straw boaters with red and blue hat bands, and black trousers, or white trousers in warm weather.

== See also ==
- Sea Chanters
