= James Burton (conductor) =

British conductor and composer (born 1974)

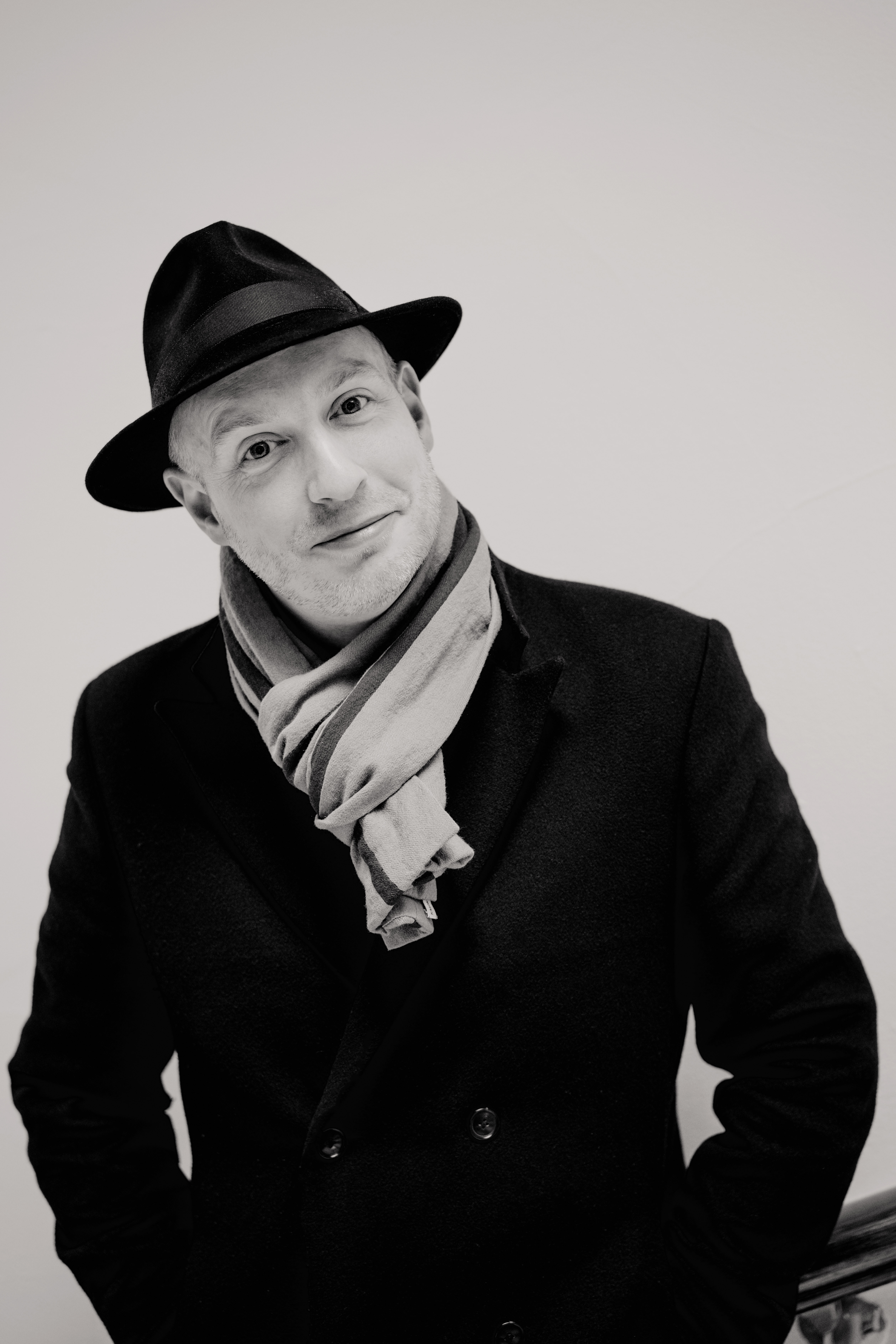
Burton in 2018

James Burton (born 1974) is a British conductor and composer.

== Early life and education ==
Born in London, Burton studied at Westminster Abbey Choir School and he became head chorister of the choir of Westminster Abbey in 1987. He was awarded a music scholarship to Radley College, and a choral scholarship to St John's College, Cambridge, where his initial interest in conducting was encouraged by Christopher Robinson. Burton holds a master's degree from the Peabody Conservatory, where he studied orchestral conducting with Frederik Prausnitz and Gustav Meier.

== Conducting ==
In February 2017, the Boston Symphony Orchestra appointed Burton as choral director, a newly created position, and conductor of the orchestra's Tanglewood Festival Chorus. He gave his Boston Symphony subscription series debut in 2018, and in April 2019 he replaced an indisposed Gustavo Dudamel to conduct a series of concerts with the Boston Symphony Orchestra and Tanglewood Festival Chorus at Boston Symphony Hall. Burton gave his Boston Pops debut with Holiday Pops concerts at Symphony Hall in December 2017, and his Tanglewood Festival debut was in June 2019 with a Boston Pops concert of the music of Queen with Marc Martel. Burton founded the Boston Symphony Children's Choir in 2018.. Burton concluded his tenure with the Boston Symphony Orchestra in August 2025.

Burton has been a frequent guest conductor of the National Symphony Orchestra of Mexico, leading performances of Beethoven's Symphony No. 9 in the Palacio de Bellas Artes to celebrate the orchestra's 90th anniversary in 2018. Other international appearances have included the Handel and Haydn Society in Boston USA, Aalborg Symphony in Denmark, and in 2017 Burton was the guest director of Japan's National Youth Choir.

In his native UK, Burton has conducted concerts with the Royal Liverpool Philharmonic Orchestra, the Orchestra of the Age of Enlightenment, The Hallé, the Ulster Orchestra, the Orchestra of Scottish Opera, Royal Northern Sinfonia, BBC Concert Orchestra and Manchester Camerata. He has conducted opera performances at English National Opera, English Touring Opera, and Garsington Opera where he won the Leonard Ingrams award in 2008. Burton's choral conducting has included Tenebrae, the Gabrieli Consort, the Choir of the Enlightenment and the Wrocław Philharmonic Choir. In 2017, Burton conducted the BBC Singers at the inaugural season of Dubai's Opera House as part of BBC Proms Dubai. From 2002 to 2009, he was choral director at The Hallé and conductor of the Hallé Choir, winning the Gramophone Choral Award in 2009 for a recording of Elgar's The Dream of Gerontius. Burton was music director of the St. Endellion Easter Festival from 2007 to 2013, succeeding Richard Hickox.. In January 2026, Ex Cathedra announced the appointment of Burton as its next artistic director, effective with the 2027–2028 season. Burton is to take the title of artistic director-designate in the spring of 2026.

Burton has worked frequently with young musicians. From 2020 to 2024, he was director of orchestral activities and master lecturer in music at Boston University. He founded the Hallé Youth Choir in 2003, and from 2002 to 2017 he was the music director of Schola Cantorum of Oxford,^{[12]} leading the choir on international tours, recordings on the Hyperion label^{[13]} and appearing in BBC TV films about British composers made by John Bridcut.^{[14]} He founded the Schola Cantorum of Oxford conducting scholarship in 2011.

== Compositions ==
Burton's compositions are published by Wise Classical, Faber Music and Edition Peters. He has received commissions from the Boston Symphony Orchestra, The Hallé, Choir of St John's College, Cambridge, the National Portrait Gallery, Edmund's Trust, and the Exon Festival where he was composer in residence in 2015. His arrangements have been played by the Boston Pops, and he orchestrated the album In Times Like These for American folk singer Arlo Guthrie.

=== Larger compositions ===
- The Lost Words (2019) upper voices and orchestra (or piano), 32 minutes The Lost Words has 12 short movements which are settings of words from the award-winning 2017 book The Lost Words by Robert Macfarlane and Jackie Morris. Commissioned jointly by The Hallé Concerts Society and the Boston Symphony Orchestra, movements of the work were performed in 2019 by the Boston Symphony Orchestra and the Boston Symphony Children's Choir at the Tanglewood Festival, and by the Southbank Sinfonia and the National Youth Choir of Great Britain at the BBC Proms. In 2024 the Royal National Scottish Orchestra gave the Scottish premiere with the RSNO Youth Chorus.
- The Convergence of the Twain (2012) SATB, baritone solo and orchestra, 18 minutes The Convergence of the Twain was composed in commemoration of the 100th anniversary of the sinking of the Titanic in 2012, and is a setting of Thomas Hardy's poem of the same name. The piece was premiered at the St Endellion Festival in 2012.

=== Other selected works ===
- O iter fortissimum (2024) SATB, 4 minutes
- Laudibus in Sanctis (2019) SATB and organ, 5 minutes
- St Cuthbert and the Otters (2018) SATB and 2-part children's choir, 8 minutes
- Tomorrow shall be my dancing day (2016) SATB and organ, 5 minutes
- O Thoma! (2016) SATB, 4 minutes
- Magnificat (2016) SATB, 4 minutes
- Psalm 67 (2016) SATB, 4 minutes
- Remember, O thou man (2016) SATB, 4 minutes
- Te lucis ante terminum (2014) SATB, 6 minutes
- Oculi Omnium (2013) SATB 2, minutes
- On Christmas Night (2013) SATB and orchestra (or organ), 5 minutes
- Balulalow (2012) SATB, 2 minutes
