= Mendelssohn Club =

Coordinates: 39.94766°N 75.16148°W

Mendelssohn Chorus of Philadelphia (formerly known as Mendelssohn Club of Philadelphia and Mendelssohn Club Chorus of Philadelphia) is a music institution in Philadelphia, Pennsylvania, founded in 1874 by William Wallace Gilchrist, a major figure in the 19th century music of Philadelphia. The chorus is currently under the direction of Dominick DiOrio (2020- ). It was previously directed by Paul Rardin from 2015 to 2020, chair of the department of choral conducting at Temple University. Prior to Rardin's appointment, the chorus was led by Alan Harler from 1988 to 2015.

== Discography ==
- Mendelssohn: A Midsummer Night's Dream (Eugene Ormandy recording)
