= Hallé Choir =

Manchester based symphonic chorus

- Choir
- Origin: Manchester, England
- Founded: 1858 (168 years ago)
- Founder: Sir Charles Hallé
- Genre: Classical
- Choirmaster: Matthew Hamilton
- Chief conductor: Kahchun Wong
- Concert hall: Bridgewater Hall, Manchester
- Associated groups: The Hallé
- Website: halle.co.uk/who-we-are/halle-choir/

The Hallé Choir is a large symphonic chorus of around 220 singers based in Manchester, England. It was founded as Manchester Choral Society alongside the Hallé Orchestra in 1858 by Sir Charles Hallé. The choir gives around 15 concerts a year with The Hallé at The Bridgewater Hall and other venues across the UK. Appearing with international conductors and soloists in concert and recordings, the choir performs a repertoire of major choral and operatic works ranging from mainstream pieces to more esoteric pieces and commissions.

Recent highlights have included performances of Elgar’s three great oratorios The Dream of Gerontius, The Apostles and The Kingdom as the climax to the Hallé’s 2022–2023 season (and all three have also been released on the Hallé’s own multi award-winning CD label), Rachmaninov’s The Bells with the Hallé and Sir Mark Elder at the 2023 BBC Proms and Fauré’s Requiem with Kahchun Wong, the Hallé’s Principal Conductor.

As well as appearing with the Hallé, the Choir also performs regularly with other orchestras at venues and festivals around the UK, including the BBC Proms, Edinburgh International Festival and York Minster. Recent collaborations have included Elgar’s The Dream of Gerontius with the London Philharmonic Orchestra and Choir under Edward Gardner at the 2022 BBC Proms, and the world premiere of Brett Dean’s In This Brief Moment with the City of Birmingham Symphony Orchestra and Chorus under Nicholas Collon, also in 2022.

Recent Hallé Choir Directors have included James Burton, Frances Cooke and Madeleine Venner. The current Hallé Choir Director is Matthew Hamilton.

== Conductors ==
- 2015 to present - Matthew Hamilton
- 2012 to 2015 - Madeline Venner
- 2002 to 2009 - James Burton

== Notable recordings ==
Since the launch of the Hallé record label in 2003 the choir has appeared on a number of recordings including Holst's Hymn of Jesus (Hallé, 2013), Delius' Sea Drift (Hallé, 2013), Matthews' Aftertones (Hallé, 2014), Vaughan-Williams' A Sea Symphony (Hallé, 2015) and Elgar's Spirit of England (Hallé, 2017). The Hallé have also won a number of awards for recordings featuring the Hallé Choir:

Award Winning Hallé Choir Recordings
Year of Recording	Composer	Work	Orchestra	Conductor	Label	Awards
2009	Elgar	The Dream of Gerontius	Hallé	Mark Elder	Hallé	Gramophone Award Best Choral Recording
2010	Wagner	Götterdämmerung	Hallé	Mark Elder	Hallé	Gramophone Award Best Opera Recording
2011	Elgar	The Kingdom	Hallé	Mark Elder	Hallé	Gramophone Award Best Choral Recording
2013	Elgar	The Apostles	Hallé	Mark Elder	Hallé	Gramophone Award Best Choral Recording BBC Music Magazine Choral Award BBC Music Magazine Recording of the Year
