= Sea Chanters =

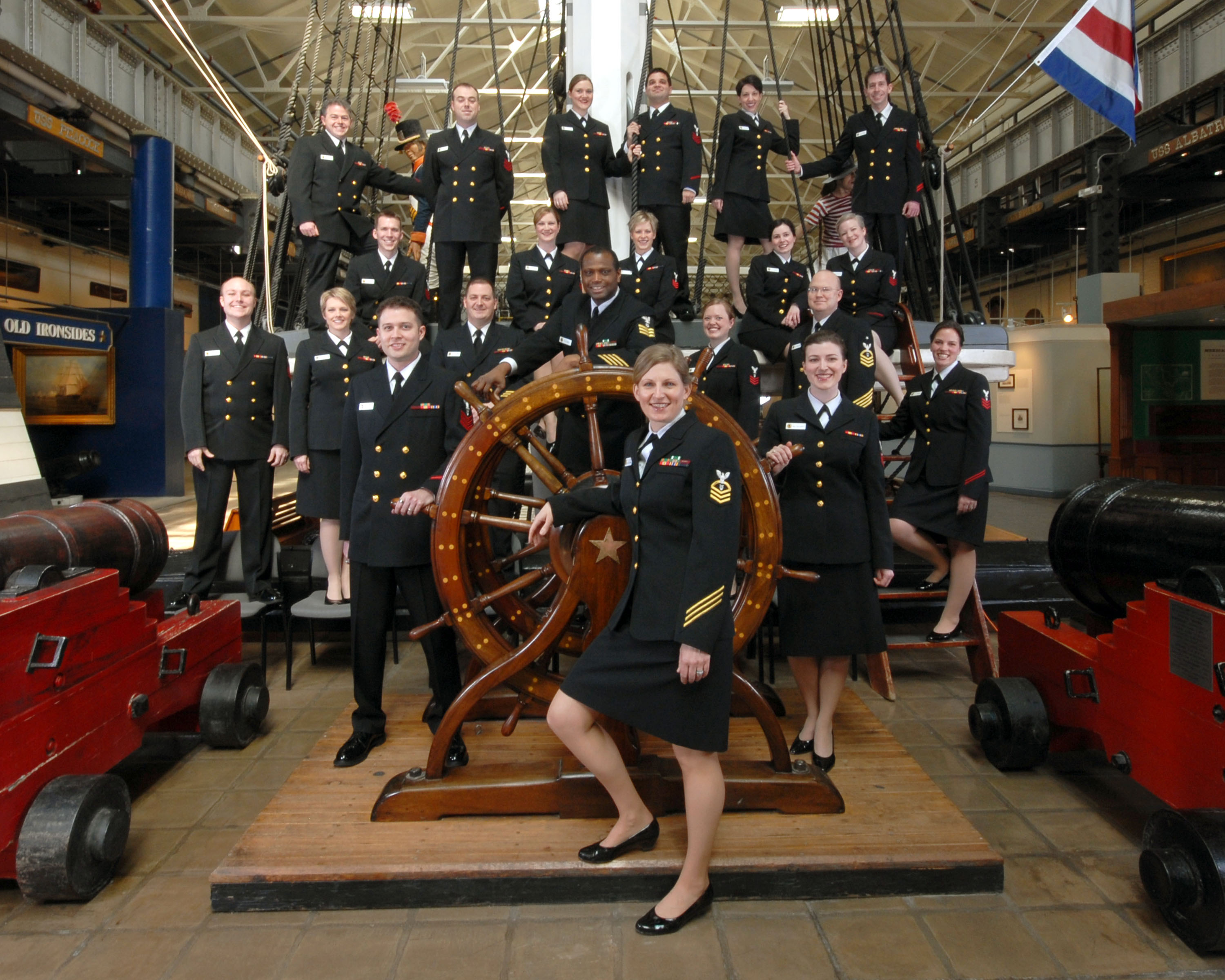
- The Sea Chanters pictured in 2009
- Active: 1956 - Present
- Country: United States
- Branch: United States Navy
- Type: Military choir
- Size: 23
- Part of: United States Navy Band
- Garrison/HQ: Washington Navy Yard
- Website: www.navyband.navy.mil/ensembles/sea-chanters

Commanders
- Musical Director: Musician 1st Class Robert Kurth

The Sea Chanters perform the "Battle Hymn of the Republic" during Memorial Day observances in 2018

The Sea Chanters (officially the United States Navy Band Sea Chanters) are a component unit of the United States Navy Band. Activated in 1956 by order of Admiral Arleigh Burke, the unit is a mixed chorus principally charged with "perpetuating songs of the sea".

== History ==
In 1956, Lt. Harold Fultz, then the U.S. Navy Band's assistant leader, organized a group from the United States Navy School of Music to sing chanteys and patriotic songs for the State of the Nation dinner. Admiral Arleigh Burke, then chief of naval operations, transferred the ensemble to the Navy Band, named them the Sea Chanters and tasked what was at the time the all-male chorus with "perpetuating the songs of the sea". In 1980, the group added women to their ranks for the first time.

In subsequent years, the group would perform on "Larry King Live", "CBS This Morning", and at the premier of Pearl Harbor. They have also appeared with Perry Como, Marian Anderson, Kenny Rogers, and Lionel Richie. The Sea Chanters' 2016 performance of the Egyptian song “Feha Haga Helwa”, sung on the occasion of the official visit of Gen. Mahmoud Hegazy to the United States, was popularly received by Egyptian social media users who viewed it "thousands" of times and commented on its "almost perfect Arabic".

=== September 11 memorial service ===
On 14 September 2001, the Sea Chanters performed the "Battle Hymn of the Republic" at the national memorial service for the September 11 attacks at the Washington National Cathedral, immediately following the eulogy by President of the United States George W. Bush. Prior to the memorial service, White House officials debated the wisdom of following Bush's speech with the "Battle Hymn of the Republic" due to both the song's length, at five stanzas, and its lyrics which were "unabashedly militant", describing the "fateful lightning" of a "terrible, swift sword". Later, some officials of the Administration cited the performance by the Sea Chanters as an "awakening" of a need for war.

== Organization ==
While during most of the year the Sea Chanters are posted to the Washington, D.C. area to support state and Navy events, they also annually embark on a three-week tour across the United States. As of 2018, a majority of its 23 members held university degrees in music and are selected to the ensemble through a process of competitive audition.

In addition to its repertoire of sea chanteys and traditional naval songs and ballads, the Sea Chanters also perform patriotic, operatic, and contemporary music.

== Notable members ==
- Rockwell Blake

== See also ==
- Alexandrov Ensemble
- Choir of the French Army
- Cleanshave
