= Middlesex County Volunteers =

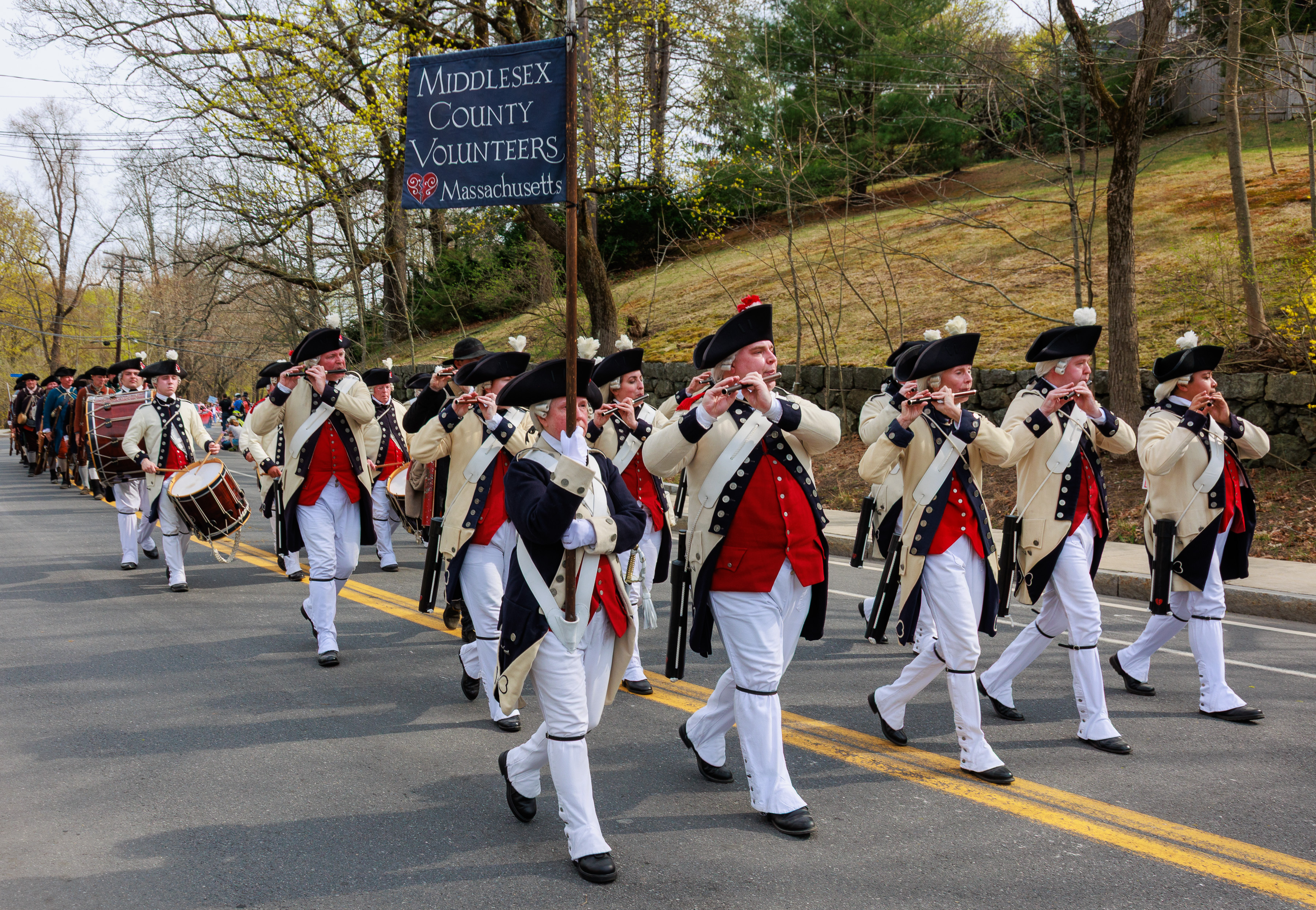
Middlesex County Volunteers in 2025

The Middlesex County Volunteers (MCV) is a 501(C)(3) not-for-profit fife and drum corps that plays music from the 17th, 18th, 19th and 20th centuries. Founded in 1982 at the end of the United States Bicentennial celebration, the group is composed of musicians and Color Guard, sixteen years and older.

The group was originally composed of young musicians from other associated Minuteman companies in Middlesex County, Massachusetts, who volunteered to conceive a music-performance specific organization. Founding members were recruited from Concord Minutemen, Stow Minutemen, Lexington Minutemen, Westborough Militia, and Arlington Minuteman.

MCV’s mission is to research, perform, and promote the music of the fife and drum, to celebrate its historic roots, and to pass this living tradition along by example and instruction.

MCV has been a supporting member of the Company of Fifers and Drummers, both financially and through performance efforts.

The Middlesex County Volunteers perform extensively throughout the Northeastern US. They have performed numerous times with John Williams, Keith Lockhart and the Boston Pops, The Boston Camerata both in New England and France, at Colonial Williamsburg's Grand Illumination, and throughout the British Isles and Western Europe. In 2005 they were featured at the Yshalle Tattoo in Basel, Switzerland. In 2007 and again in 2018 they were featured performers at the Edinburgh Military Tattoo. 2009 and 2015 found MCV at the Royal Nova Scotia International Tattoo and in February 2010 the ensemble was featured in the Edinburgh Military Tattoo's Salute to Australia in Sydney, Australia. MCV is the first American Fife & Drum ensemble to appear at the Edinburgh Military Tattoo, either in Scotland or Australia.

At conception, members deeply researched martial music of the period. Performance music was sourced from period manuscripts including: Giles Gibbs, his book (circa 1777), the Thomas Nixon manuscript (circa 1779), the Bremner manuscript, all volumes of the Aird collection(circa 1745–1800), as well as from contemporary collections such as Fifers' Delight and the Company of Fifers and Drummers books 1 and 2. The group is careful to provide sources of music on each of its recordings.

MCV wears the uniform prescribed by the U.S. Continental Army's clothing warrants of 1779. Blue coats with white facings (lapels & cuffs) were recommended for New England regiments, with white trousers and waistcoats. Musicians were recognized as "signallers," so colors were reversed as was the practice in Europe to distinguish non-combatants. Since the Continental Army derived many of its practices from Europe, the tradition of reversing the musicians' colors was also recognized.

== Recordings ==
- Stormin' the Castle (2010)
- In America (2005)
- On Christmas Day (2002)
- Lafayette's Ghost (2001)
- Military Music from the Age of Reason (1999)
- Guardian Angels (1997)
- The Banks of Allan Water (1994)
- Massachusetts (1992)
