= Modular capture vessel =

Modular capture vessels (acronym MCV) are converted oil tankers which can capture hydrocarbons or other liquid contaminations from leaking oil and gas wells in deep sea areas. MCV's in general operate as normal oil tankers and provide capture and containment services in the event of a potential deepwater well control incident.

== Background ==
In July 2010, ConocoPhillips, ExxonMobil, Chevron, and Shell formed the Marine Well Containment Company (MWCC) in order to develop an expanded containment response system to capture and contain oil in the event of a potential future underwater well control incident in the deepwater Gulf of Mexico.

The containment system was built in stages, starting with the Interim Containment System that was completed on February 27, 2011 as an immediate response system. On January 29, 2015, the Expanded Containment System made up of advanced equipment became fully operational.

== MCV Creation ==
On September 11, 2011, the Eagle Texas, a main part of the expanded containment system, was delivered to the Marine Well Containment Company. It underwent extensive conversion as processing equipment that is used to add modules to the ship when needed was added to the ship. The second MCV, Eagle Louisiana, was also modified from an Aframax Tanker in 2011, and is designed to be operated alongside the Eagle Texas. Both vessels were built and operated by AET Tanker Holdings, and work as normal tankers until needed.

== Containment System ==
In the event of an oil spill, the MWCC first attempts to stop the flow by attaching a capping stack to the well. If the well can not immediately be shut off, the Interim Containment System is put into place. In the event of a serious spill that needs to be flowed for more than six months, the Expanded Containment System is used.

The Expanded Containment System primarily utilizes its two MCVs, but also uses supporting equipment such as capping stacks and the Subsea Umbilical, Risers and Flowlines (SURF). This expanded system can be modified to specific requirements of the environment such as water depth, seafloor landscape, well flow rates, ocean currents, and debris. The first step of this system is for the fluid from the well to be transported to the MCVs by the SURF, which is a system of tubes that connect the capping stack to the vessel. The SURF has three miles of seven inch flowlines, and four miles of riser pipe. Once the fluid is on the ship, the MCV separates the fluid into oil, water, sand, and gas. It flares, or burns off, the gas, and stores the other material in the hull until offloaded by another tanker.

== Capabilities ==
MCV have many unique capabilities and are customized to receive special equipment in the event of a spill. MWCC has two of these vessels, the Eagle Texas and the Eagle Louisiana. It has the capability to flare 150 million cubic feet of gas per day and can process 50,000 barrels of oil per day. The ship’s total capacity of oil is 500,000 barrels, allowing the two MCVs to hold one million barrels of oil together. The MCV also has dynamic positioning technology, which allows it to remain in a fixed position without an anchor due to GPS. Additionally, it is able to remain up to a mile away from the well, allowing it to reduce confusion above the spill site and protect the team aboard. The MCV can also work with the interim containment system’s rig to capture 100,000 barrels of oil per day and 200 million cubic feet of gas per day.

== Shore Bases ==
The MWCC’s containment system equipment is located on two different shore bases. On July 23, 2013, MWCC announced Kiewett Offshore Systems in Ingleside, Texas as one of its basees. It stores the modular process equipment that is used to modify the MCVs in the event of an oil spill. It was chosen as it features a large workforce, two large cranes, and space to accommodate the capping stacks and both MCVs.The MWCC’s other shore base is located in Theodore, Alabama, near Mobile, and stores the SURF equipment.
