= Richard Freed =

American music critic, editor and broadcaster (1928–2022)

- Born: Richard Donald Freed; December 27, 1928; Chicago, Illinois, U.S.
- Died: January 1, 2022 (aged 93); Rockville, Maryland, U.S.
- Occupations: Music critic, editor, broadcaster
- Awards: ASCAP-Deems Taylor Award (1984); Grammy Awards (1995)

Richard Donald Freed (December 27, 1928 – January 1, 2022) was an American music critic, program annotator and administrator. He was noted for the concert program notes he authored for various orchestras and ensembles in the US.

== Early life ==
Freed was born in Chicago on December 27, 1928. His father immigrated to the United States from Russia and ran a furniture store; his mother was a housewife. He was raised in Tulsa, Oklahoma, where he read about music and records with the 1941 Victor catalog as bedside book. He studied at the University of Chicago where he received his Bachelor of Philosophy degree in 1947. Freed first worked as a contributing editor at the Saturday Review. He went on to be assistant director to Irving Kolodin from 1962 to 1963, and as a staff critic for The New York Times and The Audio Beat two years later.

== Career ==
Freed was an assistant to the director of the University of Rochester's Eastman School of Music (1966–1970) and director of public relations for the St. Louis Symphony Orchestra (1971–1972). He was executive director of the Music Critics Association of North America (MCANA) from 1974 to 1990 and served as a contributing editor of Stereo Review (from 1973), as record critic for The Washington Star (1972–1975) and The Washington Post (1976–1984), radio host for the concerts of the St. Louis and Baltimore Symphony Orchestra, and program annotator for those orchestras as well as the Houston Symphony, National Symphony Orchestra and Philadelphia Orchestra. He received two ASCAP Deems Taylor Awards for his concert and record annotations, and a Grammy Award for the latter and as consultant to the music director of the National Symphony Orchestra.

As author of several articles and reviews for newspapers and journals, Freed wrote and interpreted many historical recordings for the Smithsonian Institution. He received the American Society of Composers, Authors and Publishers Award, the ASCAP Foundation Richard Rodgers Award, Deems Taylor Award for his concert and record notes. He was nominated for a Grammy Award for Best Album Notes in 1986 and won in 1995. In his capacity as former executive director and unofficial historian of MCANA, he subsequently donated several important historical items to the organization. In addition to numerous documents that are invaluable in providing the early history of the MCANA, a series of reel-to-reel tapes of a public symposium titled "Music Criticism in America's Press" that was presented by the MCA (as it was then known) at the Kennedy Center in March 1987 are included.

== Personal life ==
Freed was married to Louise Kono for 63 years until his death. Together, they had one child (Erica). He died on January 1, 2022, at his home in Rockville, Maryland. He was 93, and suffered a heart attack prior to his death.

== Works ==
- In May 1963: The National Music Council has formed a Recording Service Committee. His article in The Gramophone, briefly, the committee reviews
- On February 25, 1967: Review of some recent Strauss recordings, "Vintage Strauss", Saturday Review
- In 1982: Masterworks, 11–13. Edition, International Alban Berg Society, University of Virginia
- On July 29, 1984, he wrote "Igor Stravinsky and Friends" in The Washington Post.
- On June 24, 1990, he wrote an article Kubelik in Prague — and in the Catalogue.
