= Tanglewood Festival Chorus =

Boston Symphony's chorus (1970–)

The Tanglewood Festival Chorus, directed by Jean-Sébastien Vallée (Boston Symphony Orchestra Director of Choruses), is a chorus which performs with the Boston Symphony Orchestra and Boston Pops in major choral works. The Tanglewood Festival Chorus (TFC) was organized in the spring of 1970, when founding conductor John Oliver (1939 – 2018) became director of vocal and choral activities at the Tanglewood Music Center, the summer home of the BSO. Originally formed for performances at the BSO's summer home at the behest of the BSO's conductor designate Seiji Ozawa, the Tanglewood Festival Chorus is the official chorus of the Boston Symphony Orchestra and Boston Pops Orchestra year-round, performing in Boston, New York and Tanglewood.

== History ==
In 1970, John Oliver proposed to the management of the Boston Symphony Orchestra that he would create a permanent chorus for the orchestra, which had relied on various area choruses for much of its history. In Oliver's words, "To my utter amazement now--I wasn't amazed then, because I was just a brash young man--they said, 'Go! Form a chorus.'" The TFC's first concert was a performance of Beethoven's Ninth Symphony at Symphony Hall in April 1970 when Leonard Bernstein substituted for William Steinberg who had fallen ill. Bernstein had been engaged to conduct the Ninth as the closing concert of the Tanglewood season that summer and expressed a preference to conduct it at Symphony Hall rather than Beethoven's Fifth Symphony which Steinberg had been scheduled to conduct.

In December 1994 the chorus joined Seiji Ozawa and the Boston Symphony Orchestra for tour performances in Hong Kong and Japan, the chorus' first performance overseas.

In February 1998, singing from the General Assembly Hall of the United Nations, the chorus represented the Americas when Seiji Ozawa led the Winter Olympics Orchestra with six choruses on five continents, all linked by satellite, in the Ode to Joy from Beethoven's Ninth Symphony to close the Opening Ceremonies of the 1998 Winter Olympics. The chorus joined Plácido Domingo, Susan Graham, and Yo-Yo Ma in performing at the funeral service for Senator Edward Kennedy on August 28, 2009.

On March 10, 2015, the Boston Symphony Orchestra announced that Oliver would retire as conductor of the TFC at the end of the summer Tanglewood season. The BSO conducted a chorus conductor search, and announced on February 2, 2017, that British conductor James Burton had been appointed as the TFC's second permanent conductor.

== Performance practice ==
The full roster includes over 200 singers who volunteer their time and talents. Subsets of the group are selected by Mr. Burton to meet the needs of the repertoire being performed. Typically a performance will involve 90-120 singers. During the Christmas Pops season, approximately 50 singers take the stage for each show. To meet the needs of the BSO, members of the TFC appear in 9-11 Christmas performances each.

== Recordings ==
The TFC has also collaborated with Seiji Ozawa and the Boston Symphony Orchestra on numerous recordings, including Mahler's Second, Third, and Eighth symphonies, Strauss's Elektra, Schoenberg's Gurre-Lieder, and Bartók's The Miraculous Mandarin, on Philips; Mendelssohn's complete incidental music to A Midsummer Night's Dream, Gabriel Fauré's Pavane, on Deutsche Grammophon; and Berlioz's Requiem and La damnation de Faust, Fauré's Requiem, and Tchaikovsky's The Queen of Spades, on RCA Victor Red Seal. Also for Philips, with the BSO under Bernard Haitink's direction, the chorus has recorded Ravel's Daphnis et Chloé and Brahms's Alto Rhapsody and Nänie. They can also be heard on the RCA Victor disc "A Splash of Pops", as well as on three Christmas albums — "Joy to the World" on Sony Classical and "We Wish You a Merry Christmas" on Philips, both with John Williams and the Boston Pops Orchestra, and "Holiday Pops" on RCA Victor with Keith Lockhart and the Boston Pops Orchestra. The Tanglewood Festival Chorus can also be heard on the soundtracks of four movies, Indiana Jones and the Temple of Doom, Close Encounters of the Third Kind ~ Director's Cut, Saving Private Ryan and Mystic River. James Taylor's wife was a member of the chorus, and her voice can also be heard as part of a "virtual" backing group for his 2007 UK tour.

On February 19, 2009, the BSO announced the launch of a new series of recordings on their own label, BSO Classics. Three of the four initial releases, all recorded live in concert, feature the Tanglewood Festival Chorus: William Bolcom's 8th Symphony (which the TFC premiered in 2008), Brahms's Ein Deutsches Requiem, and Ravel's complete Daphnis et Chloé. The 2009 Ravel recording was nominated for a Grammy Award for Best Classical Album in the nominations announced on December 2, 2009, and won the award for Best Orchestral Performance on January 31, 2010.

In 2010, BSO Classics released Tanglewood Festival Chorus: 40th Anniversary, a collection of the group's unaccompanied recordings from its Tanglewood Prelude performances between 1998 and 2005.

In October 2023, the BSO released the final installment of an eight-year-long cycle of album releases on Deutsche Grammophon featuring the complete symphonies of Dmitri Shostakovich, which included Symphonies 2, 3, 12 and 13. The recording featured the Tanglewood Festival Chorus on Symphonies 2, 3 and 13.

== See also ==
- Mendelssohn: A Midsummer Night's Dream (Seiji Ozawa recording)
