= Adolf Hohneck =

German landscape painter, lithographer and graphic artist

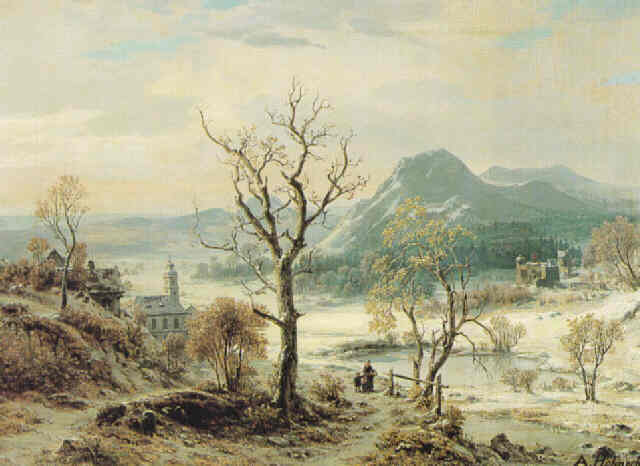
Winter Landscape

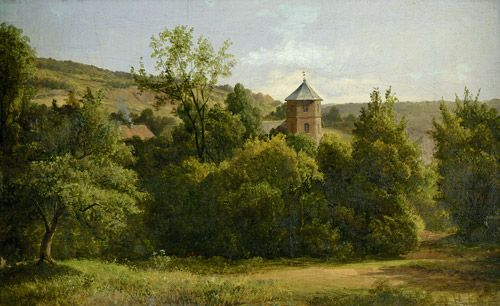
View of the Lößnitz Region

Adolf August Hohneck (3 February 1810, Eibau - 2 February 1879, Oberlößnitz) was a German landscape painter, lithographer and graphic artist.

== Biography ==
He studied painting at both the Dresden Academy of Fine Arts and the Kunstakademie Düsseldorf.

He was primarily known as a landscape painter, although he also did portraits. In 1844, he created a series of lithographs, depicting the Professors at the University of Bonn.

The Kupferstich-Kabinett, Dresden, and the Galerie Neue Meister have large collections of his lithographs and drawings.

He was married to Marie Julie, née Müller (1836–1904). They had one son and four daughters and lived in Radebeul. He died at the Bilz-Sanatorium in nearby Oberlößnitz and was interred in the cemetery at the Emmauskirche.

His daughter, Maria, was also a graphic artist and illustrator of children's books.
