= St. Joseph's C.M.E. Church =

Black church in Chapel Hill, North Carolina

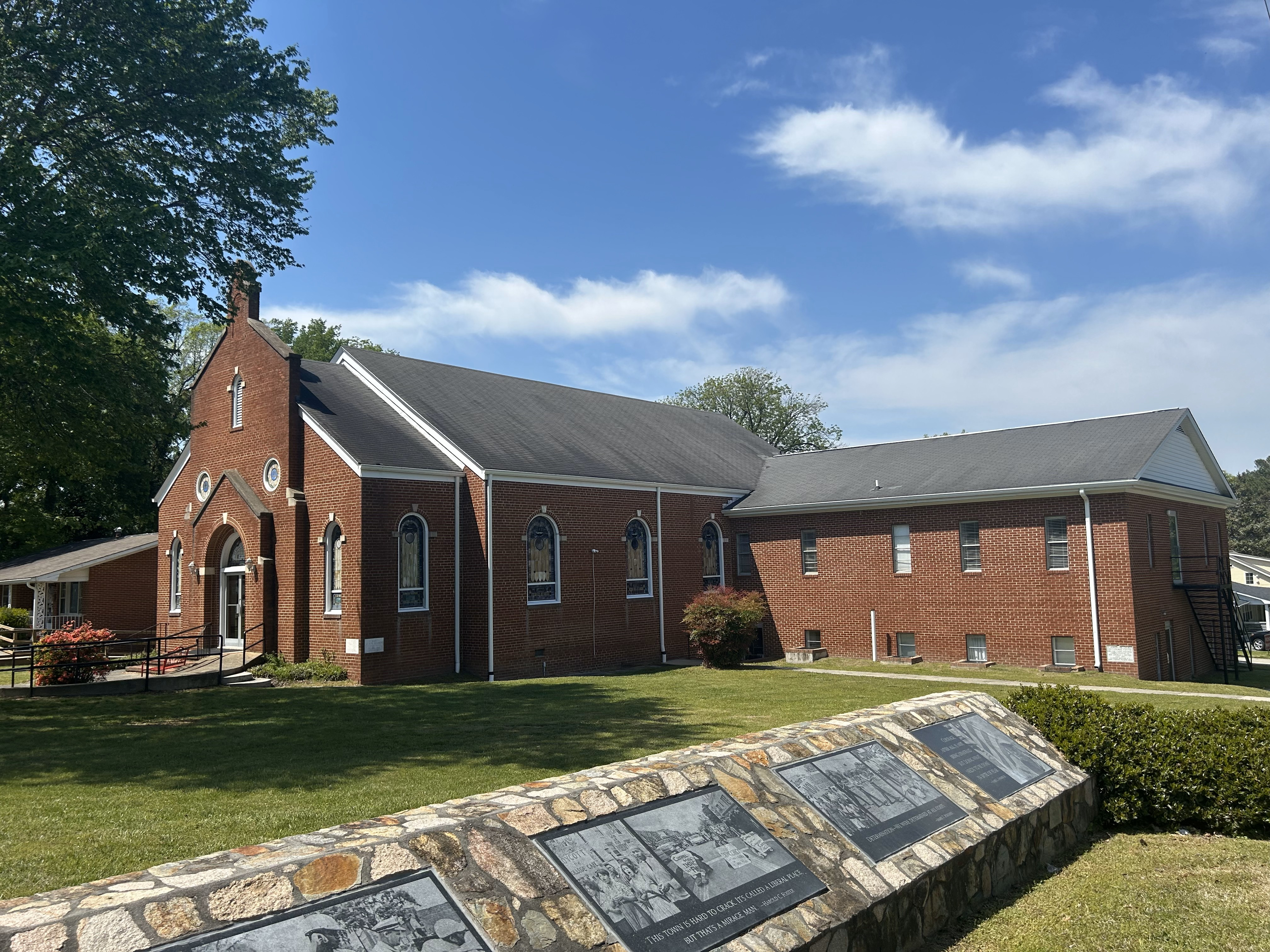
- St. Joseph's C.M.E. Church
- 35°54′41″N 79°03′52″W
- Location: 510 W Rosemary St, Chapel Hill, North Carolina
- Country: United States
- Denomination: Christian Methodist Episcopal
- Website: http://www.saintjosephcme.com/default.asp

Architecture
- Completed: 1898

Clergy
- Pastor: Reverend John A. Cradle Sr.

St. Joseph C.M.E. Church is a historically Black Christian Methodist Episcopal Church located in Chapel Hill, North Carolina, which is within the Seventh Episcopal District of the C.M.E Church. The Church was founded in the late 19th century, serving the religious and broader community of the Northside neighborhood for over a century. St. Joseph C.M.E Church played a pivotal role in the spiritual, cultural, and civil rights history of the Chapel Hill, North Carolina community and Northside neighborhood.

== History ==
Before the construction of St. Joseph C.M.E. Church, the C.M.E. community of Chapel Hill would attend religious services at the church's "mother church", Hamlet Chapel C.M.E Church, located at 2855 Hamlets Chapel Road, Pittsboro, NC. Addressing the need of the Chapel Hill C.M.E. community, Cotton C.M.E. Church was built on 509 Chapel Street, Chapel Hill (then McDade Street). The building, however, was later destroyed by a fire, and the property was sold. In the mid-20th century, the town of Chapel Hill planned on using the plot of land on 510 West Rosemary Street, Chapel Hill, for Lincoln High School, but decided that the land was too small for the project. In response, the future trustees of St. Joseph decided to purchase the land, upon which to build St. Joseph C.M.E. Church.

The Church also played an active role in the Civil Rights Movement, serving as a key gathering point for demonstrators preparing to march to nearby Franklin Street (Chapel Hill) in protest against segregation. St. Joseph has also placed a monument outside of its church commemorating Chapel Hill's Freedom Fighters, along with other scenes of civil rights activism.

The Church has been associated with a number of notable individuals and organizations, such as Emily Banks, The Gray Ladies, and Dr. Alex Chambers.

== Present day ==
=== Current worship ===
Currently, the church serves its congregation through weekly worship services including Sunday School, Sunday worship services, and Adult Bible study sessions, under the leadership of Reverend John A. Cradle Sr. Reverend Cradle ordained as a deacon in the Christian Methodist Episcopal Church subsequently appointed to the office of traveling elder. Services often include hymns and responsive readings from The Hymnal of the Christian Episcopal Church, fostering a participatory and a deeply ingrained worship experience.

=== Current ministry ===
Beyond its religious services, St. Joseph C.M.E Church operates a number of outreach initiatives. In 2002, then-pastor Reverend Troy Harrison and his wife, Bernice Harrison, established Heavenly Groceries/Comida Celestial, a food pantry and ministry of the Church which provides grocery items to under-served residents of Chapel Hill. The program, which continues to operate today, is staffed by active church members, students from the University of North Carolina at Chapel Hill, and community volunteers. St. Joseph C.M.E Church has continued its role in preserving the history of the Northside neighborhood. In 2007, Reverend Troy Harrison and University of North Carolina Professor Della Pollock initiated a partnership focused on collecting the oral histories of Northside residents. The oral histories prompted broader collective action to resist rapid displacement and the goal to preserve historically Black communities culture and legacy. The Church also collaborates with other communities and organizations in the area including the Marian Cheek Jackson Center, the Hargraves Community Center, and other local nonprofits.
