= Pottersfield =

Pottersfield Northside
- Neighborhood
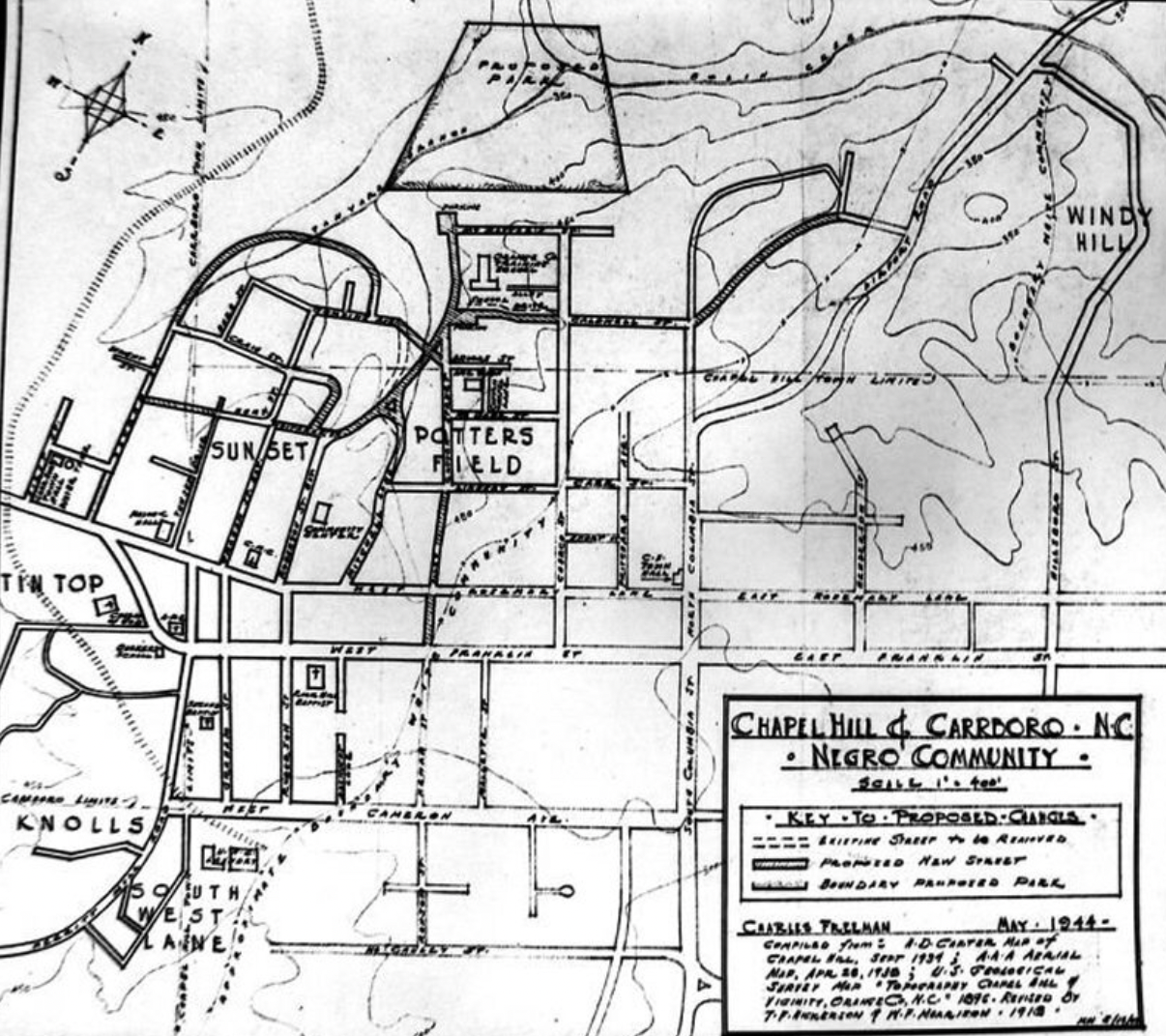
- Map of Pottersfield, 1944
- Country: United States
- State: North Carolina
- County: Orange County
- City: Chapel Hill

Pottersfield is the name associated with a historically Black neighborhood in northwest Chapel Hill, North Carolina. The neighborhood was first designated for formerly enslaved people, many of whom were “hired out” by the University of North Carolina at Chapel Hill to construct the stonewalls around campus. After the abolition of slavery and into Jim Crow era, Black community members were continuously relegated into this isolated and underdeveloped area of Chapel Hill. Through clear designations of racial lines, town commissioners and University leaders systemically excluded Pottersfield from their provisions of basic resources and opportunities well into the 20th century. Due to their resistance to these oppressive systems and commitment to creating opportunity for themselves, Pottersfield residents developed a thriving community that has persisted into the 21st Century.

== Geography ==
Pottersfield was located north of West Rosemary Street and west of Columbia Street. Nearby neighborhoods included Sunset, Tin Top, Pine Knolls, and Windy Hill, all of which were historically Black neighborhoods. East of Columbia Street was the all-white neighborhood, Pritchard’s Field.

== Origins of Name ==
While the origin of the name is not clear, some believe it relates to how the term is used in the Bible. “Pottersfield” refers to the land that was purchased by Judas using the silver he received to betray Jesus, which later became a burial site for the unidentified or indigent. This name reinforced the undesirability of the area. During the early to mid-1900s, community members often referred to their neighborhood as “Pottage Field” to push against the negative connotation of the original name and emphasize the power of their community. By the mid to late 1900s, the Pottersfield name began to fall out of usage in favor of “Northside,” which referred to both the Pottersfield neighborhood and the adjacent Sunset neighborhood. Gentrification, beginning most strongly in the 1990s, has significantly changed the racial demographics of this area, raising concerns that the name “Northside” rather than “Pottersfield” may erase the history of the historically Black neighborhood.

== History ==
=== 19th century ===
Early Pottersfield residents included the enslaved stone masons who built the rock walls that surround UNC’s campus. These enslaved stonemasons and laborers were primarily buried in unmarked graves at Old Chapel Hill Cemetery. Located on UNC’s campus, these graves were initially marked by fieldstones that were either moved or stolen.

The land designated for Pottersfield residents suffered from drainage issues due to its lower elevation and the topography of the larger area. After the abolition of slavery, Black community members pushed for improved drainage and educational opportunities. One example is Wilson Caldwell, a formerly enslaved person who worked as a groundskeeper and janitor at UNC. He was elected to the Chapel Hill board of Commissioners in 1868 and advocated for better infrastructure during Town Commission gatherings. Town Commissioners dismissed his requests for improved water access, stating that it was “impractical.” This lack of access to public infrastructure continued into the 20th century.

Caldwell and other community members similarly advocated for a public school for Black children at the Orange County Superintendent of Public Schools. Caldwell and a Quaker group helped to begin Freedman schools for early education, though a more formalized school didn’t exist until 1916.

=== Early 20th century ===
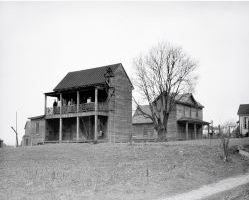
The original Orange County Training School

At the turn of the century, clear racial borders continued to develop as Black Chapel Hill residents were subject to the effects of Jim Crow and ongoing relegation across spatial lines. As a Black neighborhood in the Jim Crow South, Pottersfield endured racial tension and violence perpetuated by the white community. In several cases, white men crossed into Black communities to sexually assault Black women and attack Black men without consequence. The violent dynamic that existed between Pottersfield and white community members culminated in instances such as the 1937 Chapel Hill Race Riot.

Chapel Hill’s financial and municipal dependency on the university also played a critical role in the community’s institutionalization of Jim Crow. UNC owned the water, electric, and telephone systems for Chapel Hill well into the late 20th century. In the provision of electricity and clean water, the University allocated these services solely to the campus and surrounding white neighborhoods, while Black communities were left without. Beyond the jurisdiction of the University, the city’s sewage system was also inaccessible to Pottersfield and other Black communities. Chapel Hill’s Black community members thus resorted to dumping raw sewage into streams, relying upon open polluted surface wells and outhouses. As a result, these neighborhoods faced significant health risks in the form of communicable diseases, such as typhoid.

Under Chapel Hill’s segregated housing pattern, Pottersfield and the surrounding Black neighborhoods were excluded from the provisions provided by the Chapel Hill School Tax district. The tax district’s original trustees drew district lines in a pattern that excluded Chapel Hill’s Black neighborhoods and effectively omitted Black students from learning. The county’s education for Black students was limited to the Quaker Freedman School, which taught first through seventh grade. Additional educational support included a night school for Black students that was sponsored by the UNC-YMCA. While it was taught by UNC students, the Black community paid for the wood and oil necessary to conduct the lessons.

Due to limited educational provisions for Black students, Pottersfield residents and the neighboring communities were forced to fill the remaining opportunity gaps on their own. The keystone of these efforts is the, a privately funded institution established in 1913 that provided instruction to students beyond the seventh grade. In 1916, the Hackney School merged with the county’s Quaker Freedman School to become the Orange County Training School. However, in 1922, the Orange County Training School burned down and Black Chapel Hill residents were forced to draw upon their own resources to provide a solution. A Black fraternal organization, the Odd Fellows, and a Black business, the Guthrie Theater, each provided their facilities to see to the continued education of Black students in the school’s absence. A Rosenwald School built on a different plot of land replaced the original Orange County Training School and was eventually renamed Lincoln High School. The change came as a result of Black parents’ desire to better represent the academic rigor and potential of their community’s students.

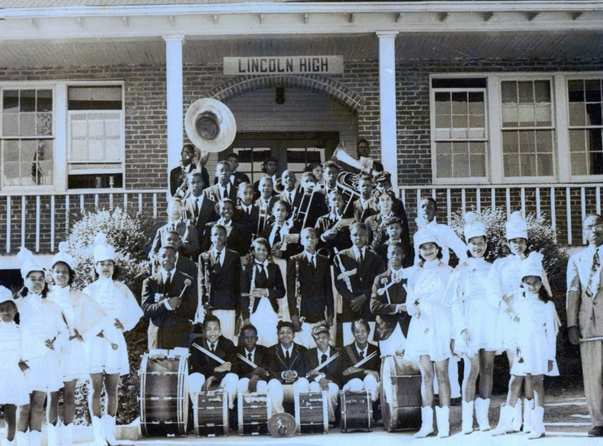
Lincoln High School students

=== Late 20th century ===
By the mid-1950s, “Pottersfield” and the adjacent historically Black neighborhood of Sunset began to be referred to collectively as “Northside.” By 1951, half of all high school students in Chapel Hill were Black. These students, which included many children from Northside, attended Lincoln High School. As a large source of community pride, Lincoln High garnered attention for its football team and marching band. Additionally, despite having fewer resources, Lincoln High demonstrated test scores comparable to and, in some cases, higher than those of the predominantly white Chapel Hill High School. Lincoln High School students were also at the forefront of social change in Chapel Hill during the late 50s into the 60s. The Chapel Hill Nine, a group of Lincoln High students, staged the town’s first sit-in at Colonial Drug.

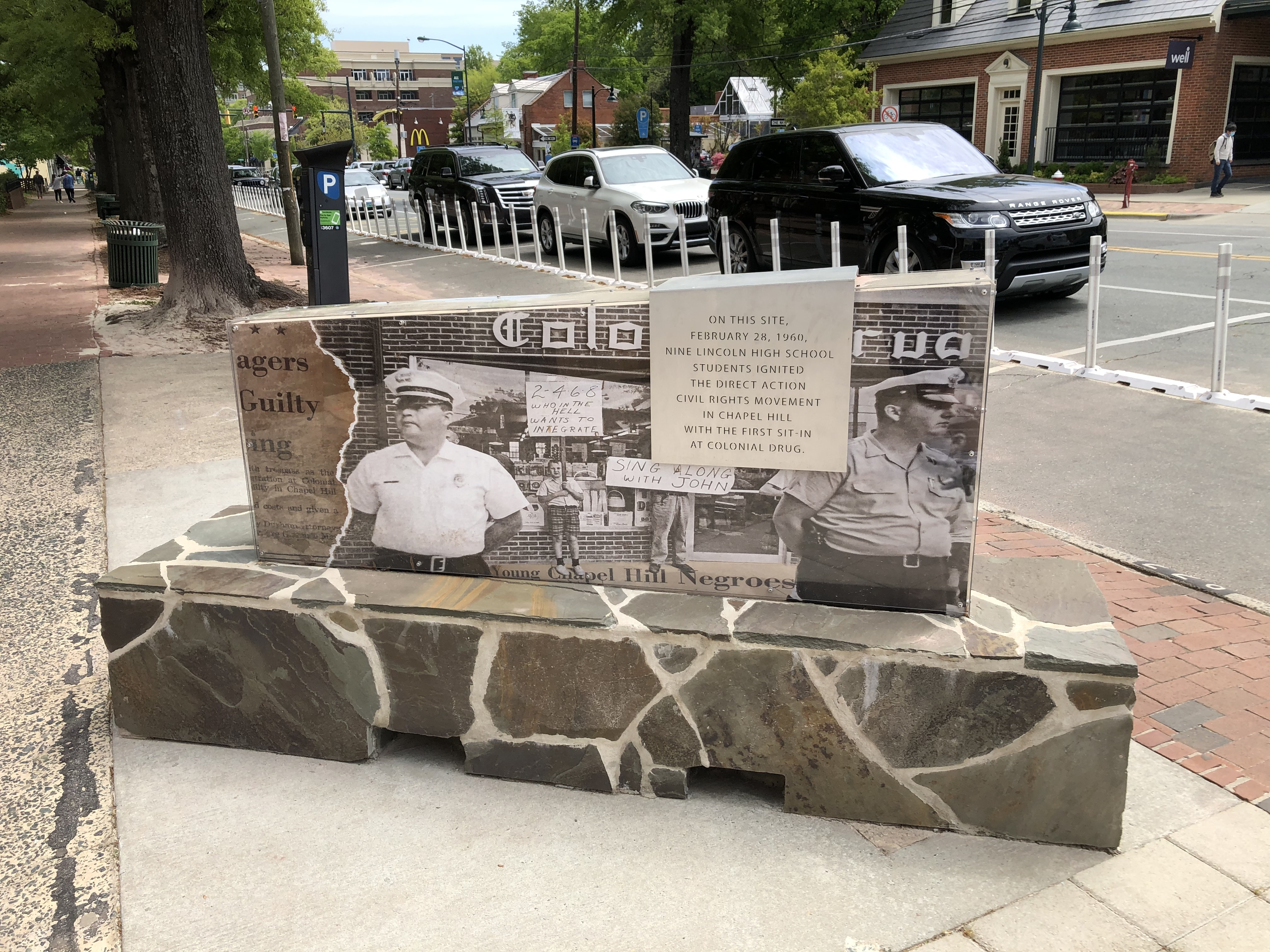
The Chapel Hill Nine Marker at the former site of the Colonial Drug Company

The town of Chapel Hill participated in some desegregation efforts prior to the 1960s, such as the decision to hire two Black police officers in 1949. However, the two officers were only hired on a part-time basis to patrol Black neighborhoods, like Pottersfield, during "rush hour" from 7:30 to 11:00 p.m. Additionally, community activists criticized the town’s gradual approach and spurred the broader community to action, pressuring local businesses to integrate. The sit-ins at Colonial Drug Store and Watts Restaurant and Grill are key examples of activists’ efforts, led by Chapel Hill’s Black students.

In 1966, Lincoln High School closed as Chapel Hill-Carrboro schools were integrated. Community members in Pottersfield and other historically Black neighborhoods identify this moment as a crucial step forward, while also recognizing that many of the Black teachers who shaped Lincoln High and the community lost their jobs or were demoted.

By the late 60s and early 70s, urban renewal emerged as another critical issue for Northside community members. Residents in the neighborhood were offered money to move out, and some homes were condemned. Black residents, whose families had resided in the neighborhood for generations, began to be displaced. Following the Chapel Hill Civil Rights Movement, the community rallied together once again in the 70s to address this new crisis. In partnership with the Joint Orange-Chatham Community Action Agency, they worked to replace and restore homes in the neighborhood. However, by 1980, Northside experienced a large influx of college students. The shift to rental properties meant that many longtime residents of Pottersfield could not afford to live in their homes. To combat this issue, two UNC Social Work students formed EmPOWERment, Inc in 1996. This organization works to create affordable housing and promotes community-centric organizing and economic development.

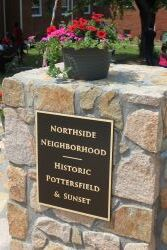
Northside Neighborhood Memorial, placed at the intersection of Pottersfield and Sunset neighborhoods

== Enduring Culture ==
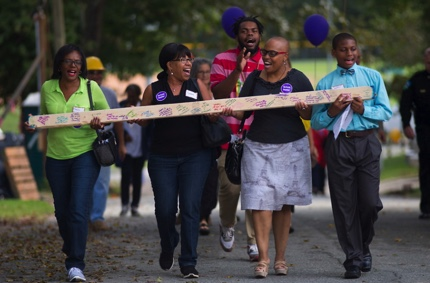
Northside Neighborhood Initiative celebration attendees holding a signed stud for a new Habitat For Humanity home

Issues relating to urban renewal continued into the 21st century. In 2004, after creating a neighborhood watch system, community members worked with the town to classify Pottersfield as a Neighborhood Conservation District, however, by 2010, more than 450 Black residents had left Pottersfield. This was a 40% decrease since 1980. As older residents of Pottersfield died, their children sold their property, or they began to rent the property out.

On May 9, 2015, the Northside Neighborhood Initiative was launched by the community in partnerships with organizations such as the Marian Cheek Jackson Center (MCJC) and Self Help, as well as the larger towns of Carrboro and Chapel Hill. These partnerships were launched with the mission of honoring the history of the area as well as ensuring the prosperity and longevity of the community. It was through these partnerships that, in 2017, the Freedom Fighters Gateway monument was established to commemorate the civil rights protests that happened in Pottersfield. Additionally, to promote further development of the neighborhood and promote affordable housing, the MCJC formed the Northside Action Market Plan. University of North Carolina at Chapel Hill has offered aid in the form of an interest-free three-million-dollar loan to create the Northside Land Bank, delivered alongside community participation by student and non-profit organizations who have built homes and acquired properties for current and retired University employees.

Since 2020, the Northside Neighborhood Initiative (NNI) has been successful in various endeavors, such as promoting market equilibrium, educating student tenants, retaining multi-generational families, and attracting new homeowners who wish to live in close-knit, connected communities. As a result, there has been an increase in the number of Black residents and the creation of 40 affordable housing units. Additionally, efforts have been made to promote environmentally conscious transportation in the community, such as walking, biking, and public transit, with the aim of reducing traffic congestion, improving air quality, and promoting healthier lifestyles.

== See also ==
- University of North Carolina at Chapel Hill
- Chapel Hill, North Carolina
