= 1937 Chapel Hill race riot =

Historical event in Chapel Hill

1937 Chapel Hill Race Riot
- Part of the Great Depression in the United States
- Date: August 21, 1937
- Location: Border of Chapel Hill and Carrboro; 35.9096°N 79.0649°W
- Caused by: Economic hardship, mass unemployment, lack of public services for Black community
- Methods: Stone throwing, gunfire, traffic obstruction

Parties
Carrboro, Chapel Hill, and Durham police	White community	Black community

Lead figures
Carrboro Police: Chief R. H. Mills Chapel Hill Police: Chief W. T. Sloan Durham Police: Chief G. W. Proctor	Unknown	Unknown

Number
5 officials at Yarborough's before reinforcements 8 officers from Durham around midnight	Unknown, 1 truck full of men around midnight	~300 in the crowd at Yarborough's around midnight

Casualties
- Injuries: 5-10 hit by gunfire, 3 seriously injured
- Arrested: At least one

The 1937 Chapel Hill Race Riot was an instance of civil unrest in Orange County, North Carolina during the Great Depression. It began at the border between the towns of Carrboro and Chapel Hill near where Carrboro's Main Street meets Chapel Hill's West Franklin Street, at Yarborough’s service station.

The incident, also called the outrage on Franklin Street, took place amidst heightened economic hardships for both white and black workers in the area, as well as a complete lack of public services for Black neighborhoods. Geeta N. Kapur and John K. Chapman each described the incident as a revolt by Black workers.

== Background ==
In 1930, on the backdrop of the Great Depression, Durham Hosiery Mill #4, one of the main mills in Carrboro, closed. Two other Carrboro mill closings in 1935 and 1937 left hundreds of workers unemployed.

The University of North Carolina, which controlled the local water, electric, and telephone systems at the time, excluded the black community from its services.

The campus and surrounding white neighborhoods had electricity, but the Black community was deliberately left in the dark. The unpaved, unlit streets were rough roads that turned into a muddy mess when it rained.

While clean drinking water was provided to the white community, Black community members drank from 22 "open, polluted wells", resulting in the spread of disease within the black community.

Racial tensions had recently been stoked by "flagrant" interracial sexual relations between white men and black women, which had been happening for over a year. Black men were forbidden from having relationships with white women, and the double standard became a source of tension.

Jim Crow hiring practices were also a cause of unrest for the black community:

Indeed, economic and social policies laid out by factory owners and politicians bore a direct responsibility for maintaining an atmosphere of racial tension. Carrboro’s sawmills and textile factories operated under a rigorously enforced system of white preference in all non-custodial employment, and caste rules in Chapel Hill restricted black men to low-wage menial labor, with laundry and domestic work for black women.

— Matt Robinson, Race Riot, INDY Week, 2002

The night before the riot, a black man had been arrested “on an unspecified charge because he had been ‘uppity,' according to UNC student Junius Scales. On this, John Chapman said, "It was not racial hatred but anger at Jim Crow police behavior that motivated black Chapel Hill workers to revolt."

On the afternoon of August 21, tensions over this arrest led to a standoff between white and black crowds on Carrboro's Main Street, between Lloyd Street and Franklin. At 10pm, black community members reported a disturbance in the black neighborhood of Pottersfield (now Northside) which is suspected to have been related to the confrontation in town.

== Events ==
At 11pm on August 21, a white driver was pulling into Yarborough's service station, at the intersection of Franklin Street and Merritt Mill Road on the west end of Chapel Hill, when a rock struck his windshield. In anger, the driver got out of his car and punched a black man, Tom Atwater. As Atwater grabbed a water jug to defend himself, another white man, Yarborough's attendant James Horne, smashed a beer bottle over Atwater's head.

The police were called to the scene, and officers including Chapel Hill police chief W. T. Sloan arrived at Yarborough's. By the time they arrived, a crowd had formed at the site of the attack. Chapel Hill police brought Atwater to the hospital for his injuries, while Carrboro police brought Horne to the jail at Carrboro Town Hall. Many of the blacks in the crowd were of the understanding that police had arrested Atwater, heightening tensions. A crowd of 40-50 "angry blacks" followed Horne to the jail, sparking official fears of a Black lynch mob. This fear prompted Carrboro police chief R. H. Mills to have Horne moved to the Hillsborough jail, causing the crowd at Carrboro Town Hall to return to the scene at Yarborough's.

Meanwhile, the crowd at Yarborough's had swelled to roughly 300 black community members who had started "furiously shouting and throwing rocks and bricks at white people walking by", as well as shooting into the air. With only five white officials present at the scene, the crowd moved into the street, blocking all traffic between Carrboro and Chapel Hill. Chief Sloan contacted the Durham Police Department for reinforcements, and around midnight the siren was sounded at the Carrboro Fire Department, "sounding the riot call".

Moments after the siren was sounded, a truck reinforced with crossties (described as a makeshift armored vehicle) drove in from Carrboro, and white men in the vehicle began shooting into the crowd.

Although taken by surprise, the blacks fought back. In his report on the incident to the mayor of Chapel Hill, Sloan asserted, “The negroes were returning the gunfire very promptly.” Black residents fired from windows of houses lining the street, and at least one man, Sinclair Farrington, reportedly climbed on top of Yarborough’s and was shooting from the roof.

Officials estimated that 100-200 rounds were fired during the shootout, and 5-10 people were injured, three seriously. However, no one was killed.

Of those seriously injured, two were black and one was white. The two black men, Sinclair Farrington and Charlie Durham, were taken to Lincoln hospital in Durham, "where attendants were told the men had been in an auto accident". The white man, Ralph Neville, "was taken to Duke Hospital after he reportedly fell from the truck, was hit by a dislodged crosstie, and then was run over by a car. His injuries, however, weren’t believed to be serious."

The truck attack at midnight dispersed much of the crowd, but the unrest lasted until 4am, when rioters were fully dispersed by police reinforcements from Durham using Thompson submachine guns and tear gas.

== Aftermath ==
=== Town Response ===
As early as [the following] morning, Chief Sloan, Chapel Hill Town Manager J. L. Caldwell, Carrboro Manager Winslow Williams, and Alderman Burch, a university administrator in charge of UNC's Physical Plant, met to sum up events and explore methods of suppressing future disorders.

The day following the riot, tensions remained high and officials still feared "that the previous night’s events might be a harbinger of things to come." Chief Sloan advised local businesses not to sell any ammunition that day, and police reinforcements from Durham and Hillsborough remained on standby in case of another "outbreak of violence". At their morning meeting, Chapel Hill Town Manager Caldwell made plans to purchase the town "a submachine gun with ammunition, twelve hand grenades, and 'three gas billies with twelve cartridges'". It was decided that Chapel Hill, Carrboro, and UNC would split the costs of the purchase, and ended up spending $164.50 each on the acquisition.

That night, still fearing a continuation of the violence, police were armed with borrowed equipment from Durham, and UNC "held its security officers on standby". However, inclement weather and heavy rain prevented any further escalations.

The situation remained tense over the following week. Officials feared that a heavyweight boxing match between a black man, Joe Louis, and a white man, Tommy Farr, in New York that night would incite more violence. Carrboro hired two temporary police officers and Chapel Hill made preparations to deputize some of its employees in preparation. However, the match was postponed due to weather in New York, and an escalation does not appear to have taken place.

Carrboro Police Chief R. H. Mills chose not to charge Horne for assaulting Atwater. He was quoted as saying he "hoped that the incident would be forgotten as quickly as possible.”

=== Retaliation against the black community ===
"Later the police and the red-necks came down heavily on the Negroes," reported Junius Scales, a UNC student. He reported that his family's black house servants did not show up to work for 3 days after the riot. He said, "I heard from them the stories ... of violence and threats ... sheer terror reigned in the Negro community for three days." Robinson reported, "Most blacks stayed indoors in the late August heat during this 'reign of terror,' fearful for the safety of themselves and their families."

=== UNC Investigation ===
White community officials asked the University to investigate the causes of the night's violence. UNC Sociology professors Howard Odum and Guy Johnson promptly "assigned their best graduate students to interview people in the Black community." Their investigation found that the black community in Chapel Hill was extremely neglected, without clean water, electricity, or safe roads.

=== Community Center ===
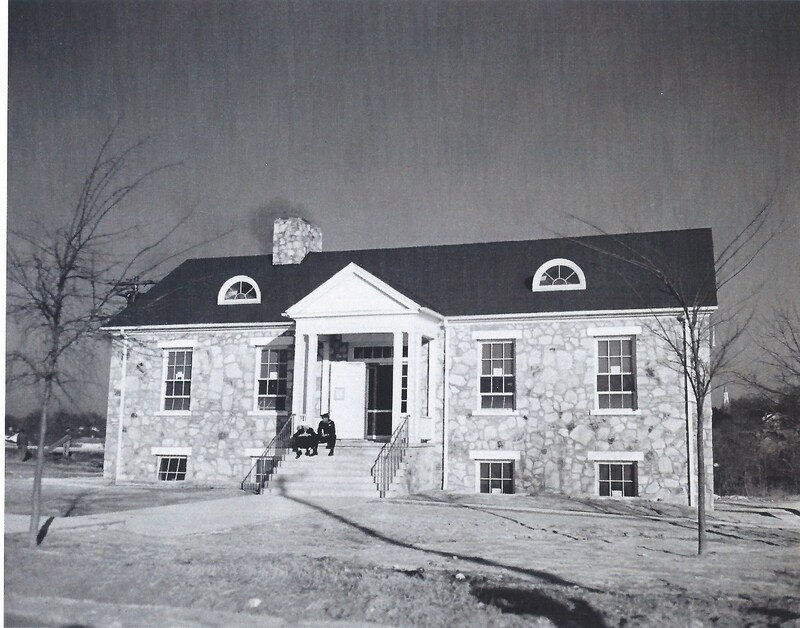
The Hargraves Community Center circa 1942

Prompted by the night's events, "members of the white establishment in Chapel Hill initiated an unprecedented coalition with 'the better class of Negroes,'" Chapel Hill's black upper class. They revived a plan for a black community center which had been on the table for several years, but had not been able to get sufficient support, hoping that it would "get young black men off the streets and pacify the black community". Money was raised, and a biracial committee was formed to oversee the project. Land for the project, the Negro Community Center (today the Hargraves Community Center), was purchased in 1939. Construction was completed in 1945.

=== Black organizing ===
After the riot, the black working class of Chapel Hill retained their new militancy. In March 1942, they formed a local union as part of the CIO. The black community was drawn to the CIO as it was an integrated union, encouraging black leadership and opposing Jim Crow employment practices. Chapman considered this a natural response to the white establishment's focus on the community center, which was welcomed by the black community but failed to address "the fundamental needs of black workers for economic and racial justice".

== See also ==
- Chapel Hill, North Carolina
- Carrboro, North Carolina
- The Great Depression in the United States
- Black August (commemoration)
- Jim Crow laws
