= A.D. Clark Pool =

- Interactive map of the A.D. Clark Pool area

General information
- Location: 216 North Roberson Street, Chapel Hill, North Carolina, United States
- Coordinates: 35°54′46.368″N 79°3′49.824″W
- Groundbreaking: 1960
- Opened: June 1961
- Owner: Town of Chapel Hill

Website
- Official Website

The A.D. Clark Pool is a public swimming facility located in Chapel Hill, North Carolina. Opened in June 1961 at the Hargraves Community Center, Black residents established the pool in order to provide a safe and accessible swimming space for their community during the era of segregation. Adolphus D. Clark (A.D. Clark), the pool’s namesake and first president of the Chapel Hill NAACP, spearheaded these efforts, serving as president of the Chapel Hill-Carrboro Swimming Pool Association. Funds for the pool’s construction came from the Black community’s grassroots fundraising efforts and a $40,000 donation from Chapel Hill resident and former UNC librarian, Cornelia S. Love.

Today, the A.D. Clark Pool is operated by the Town of Chapel Hill and continues to serve as a vital community resource, offering seasonal public swim times, lessons, and local events.

== Background ==
Prior to the construction of A.D. Clark Pool, the pools in Chapel Hill were segregated, leaving Black residents without a safe, public swimming facility to use. As a result, members of the Black community often swam in local creeks or swimming holes, which were frequently polluted by sewage. Swimmers encountered snakes as well, and these unsafe conditions ultimately led to fatalities from Typhoid infections and one reported snake bite. Some individuals traveled to Raleigh to swim at Pullen Park, a site 26 miles away from Chapel Hill.

During this era of segregation, many Black community members protested their inability to access public swimming facilities in Chapel Hill. After being denied a university pool pass, Floyd McKissick, one of the first African-American law students at UNC Chapel Hill, jumped into the university’s pool fully clothed in protest. A separate group of Black youth brought a proposal to UNC’s Athletic Department, petitioning to have access to the pool for one day a month, after which they would drain and clean the pool themselves. They were directed up the chain of command, eventually meeting with UNC’s Chancellor R.B. House, at which point their efforts were effectively stalled.

In 1960, the town began to invest more heavily in neighborhood recreation infrastructure and maintenance. Capitalizing on the moment, A.D. Clark, a prominent member of Northside, a historically Black neighborhood in Chapel Hill, led a proposal via the Chapel Hill-Carrboro Swimming Pool Association to construct a swimming pool at the Hargraves Community Center. According to the proposal, after construction, the Swimming Pool Association intended to cede continued operation and maintenance of the pool to the town’s recreation commission. The pool was to be financially supported by funds allocated to the Hargraves Community Center from the Community Chest, as well as admission fees.

== Construction and Opening ==
Construction of the pool was enabled by a $40,000 donation from Cornelia S. Love, a long-time coworker of Clark’s at Wilson Library, and the grassroots fundraising efforts of local Black businesses and community members. Built throughout the year 1960, local Black masons volunteered their labor, using their free time to pour concrete and bring the community project to life. The pool officially opened its doors to locals in June of 1961 with a six-person staff that consisted of lifeguards, bathhouse attendants, and a supervisor. The pool was officially named for A.D. Clark in recognition of his efforts as president of the Chapel Hill-Carrboro Swimming Pool Association, as well as his larger advocacy efforts for the local Black community. Becoming the first public pool in Chapel Hill accessible to Black residents, A.D. Clark Pool provided not only a safe space for recreation but also jobs for local teenagers as lifeguards and snack bar attendants and swim lessons for community members of all levels.

== Safety Concern and Reform ==
On August 3, 1987, a five-year-old Black child drowned in A.D. Clark Pool. Ten days later, on August 13, a group of Black citizens wrote to the town manager, voicing their concern that the drowning resulted from the negligence of the four white lifeguards on duty, who were not sensitive to the needs of this Black child. In response, the Assistant Town Manager recommended a number of reforms in advance of the pool’s re-opening the following summer. These reforms included hiring a minority pool manager, increasing the number of staff on duty at a given time, increasing pay for lifeguards, partnering with UNC and N.C. Central students to recruit a diverse staff, and developing a staff orientation that required pool lifeguards to undergo a training that introduced them to the history of the community and the pool’s patrons.

== See also ==
- NAACP
- Carrboro
