= Chapel Hill Museum =

Museum in Chapel Hill, North Carolina, US

- Former museum facade

- Chapel Hill Museum
- Established: 1996
- Location: Virtual
- Coordinates: 35.916367°N 79.047461°W
- Type: Local, historical, cultural
- Visitors: 20,000+ annually
- Director: Traci Davenport
- Public transit access: Chapel Hill Transit
- Website: www.chapelhillmuseum.org

Chapel Hill Museum was a local cultural and historical museum in Chapel Hill, North Carolina. The museum was founded in 1996 by leaders of the Town of Chapel Hill's Bicentennial Committee and celebrated its 10th anniversary in 2006. In the decade since its founding, Chapel Hill Museum averaged over 20,000 visitors a year and provided education programs to over 3,500 local students a year. The museum closed on July 11, 2010.

== History ==
The building in which the museum was housed was designed by architect Don Stewart and dedicated in 1968 as the Chapel Hill Public Library. Though contemporary in design, the structure and site incorporate many familiar elements of Chapel Hill construction, such as stonework and lush vegetation.

After a new library was built on Estes Drive, the building at 523 E. Franklin had multiple uses, including the housing of the Chapel Hill Historical Society, before becoming the site for the Chapel Hill Museum.

The upstairs was divided among two gallery spaces, a gift shop, a director's office, a volunteer room and a kitchen/workroom space. On the lower level is a meeting room, the offices of the Historical Society, and the archival storage areas of the museum.

Since its opening in 1996, the museum engaged in partnerships with numerous community organizations, university departments, and individuals, including: the Arts Center, Carolina Center for Public Service, Chapel Hill News, Chapel Hill-Carrboro Chamber of Commerce, Chapel Hill-Carrboro City Schools, Chapel Hill Fire Department, Chapel Hill Police Department, Chapel Hill Garden Club, Chapel Hill Historical Society, Chapel Hill Public Arts Commission, Guild of Natural Science Illustrators, International Association of Firefighters, Kidzu Children's Museum, Lincoln High School Alumni, North Carolina Botanical Garden, North Carolina Department of Cultural Resources, North Carolina Governor's Award for Outstanding Volunteer Service, North Carolina Historical Reenactment Society, North Carolina Occupational Safety and Health Education and Research Center, North Carolina Pottery Center, North Carolina Symphony – Triangle Youth Symphony, Orange County Arts Commission, Orange County Smart Start Program, Preservation North Carolina, Preservation Society of Chapel Hill, Robert Ruark Society, Ruth Faison Shaw Foundation, Society of Children's Book Writers and Illustrators, Southern Foodways Alliance, The Paul Green Foundation, Town of Chapel Hill (Chapel Hill Public Library; Parks and Recreation; Bicentennial Committee; Chapel Hill Downtown Partnership; Archives/Storage for Town and Library; Sister City; Town archives research support), Triangle Guild of Weavers, Triangle Youth Ballet, UNC-CH (Center for the Study of the South; Coker Arboretum; Creative Writing Department; Department of English; Department of History; Kenan-Flagler Business School; School of Journalism – Photojournalism program; School of Medicine – The Burn Center; School of Public Health; Service Learning Program – APPLES; Wilson Library – North Carolina Collection; Southern Historical Collection; Sonja Haynes Stone Black Cultural Center), University of North Carolina Press, and Visitor's Bureau of Orange County/Chapel Hill.

Individuals include Michael Brown, Mildred Council, Janet Green, Kaffe Fassett, Bill Friday, Frances Hargraves, Mark Hewitt, Luther Hodges Jr., Everett James and Nancy Farmer, Alexander Julian, Thomas Kenan III, Georgia Kyser, Howard and Lillian Lee, Siglinda Scarpa, Bland Simpson, R.D. and Euzelle Smith, Maxine Swalin, James Taylor, Bob Timberlake, David zum Brunnen and Serena Ebhardt.

== The collection ==
=== Permanent exhibits ===
- Meet Me On Franklin Street
  - Franklin Street (Chapel Hill) is the heart of Chapel Hill, home to long-time traditions, and the place to go for restaurants, shopping, parades, protests, and celebrations. From the auction of the village lots in 1793, to the 2005 celebration of UNC's basketball championship, exhibit visitors stroll down a 1940s streetscape, photographed by Bayard Wooten, and experience Franklin Street then and now.
- Alexander Julian
  - A native of Chapel Hill, fashion designer Alexander Julian is a five-time Coty Award winner and the youngest inductee to the Fashion Hall of Fame.
- Heroes of Yesterday, Heroes of Today: The History of the Chapel Hill Fire Department
  - In 1902, the first Chapel Hill firefighters were a handful of volunteers who were determined to protect the community's life and property. This new multi-media exhibit, opening August 23, 2007, details the expansions and advancements of the department throughout its history.
- Chapel Hill's 1914 Fire Truck
  - The town's original 1914 fire truck currently lives in retirement at the Chapel Hill Museum.
- Carolina On My Mind: The James Taylor Story
  - A comprehensive exhibition of the life and work of James Taylor, one of Chapel Hill's favorite sons, the exhibit includes his actual Rock and Roll Hall of Fame trophy, the Grammy for the “Hourglass’ album, photographs and documents from his early life in Chapel Hill and a video documentary theater.
- Farmer/James Pottery Collection
  - Pottery by North Carolinian and southern potters, from a significant survey collection of southern art pottery. A portion of the 280-piece collection is on display permanently. It was donated by noted author and folklore expert, Dr. A. Everrette James, and his wife, Dr. Nancy Farmer.
- The Paul Green Legacy
  - As novelist, Dramatist Laureate of NC, professor of Drama and Philosophy at UNC-Chapel Hill, playwright, musician, Pulitzer recipient, inventor of the concept of symphonic outdoor drama and an ardent champion of human and civil rights, Paul Green is one of North Carolina's favorite sons. The exhibition documents Green's life, work and legacy.

=== Rotating Exhibits ===
- Current rotating exhibit information is found on the Chapel Hill Museum website.

=== Past Exhibits ===
A sample list of past exhibits. There are more past exhibits listed in the Chapel Hill Museum Archives online.

- Town Treasures (October 2 – November 30, 2008) – The recognition of Town Treasures is an annual program of the Chapel Hill Historical Society and will be exhibited at the Chapel Hill Museum, acknowledging the contributions the individuals make to the community through long years of extraordinary service.
- Hard Circus Road: The Odyssey of the North Carolina Symphony – The exhibit featured the story of Lamar Stringfield, who started the North Carolina Symphony in 1932, and Benjamin and Maxine Swalin, who took the Symphony from its humble beginnings to its current state. Pieces included programs from early symphony concerts, photographs, and early press articles on the North Carolina's traveling musicians.
- Of Field, Forest and Fancy: Artwork by the Guild of Natural Science Illustrators (June 7 – September 30, 2007) – This was the second annual exhibit of the Guild of Natural Science Illustrators at the Chapel Hill Museum. The artwork focused on the varied forms of nature found across the state of North Carolina. 20 artists exhibited their works.
- Lincoln High – The exhibit featured the story of the town's only all-Black High School before desegregation. A visual documentary that captured the Lincoln High experience of Orange County African Americans who attended the school from 1951 until it closed in 1966. The exhibition chronicles the academic, athletic and artistic history of Lincoln High students and teachers. Exhibited portraits of Lincoln High alumni were taken by famed area photographer, Bob Gilgor.
- Why? – A Community-Wide Project (April 1 – May 30, 2007) – The Chapel Hill Public Arts Commission's community-wide project was hosted by the Chapel Hill Museum for the fourth year. This exhibit was part of a larger exhibit hosted in many venues throughout the Chapel Hill community.
- 37th Frame: The Best of Carolina Photojournalism – This annual show was held at the Chapel Hill Museum for five years and is open to all University of North Carolina at Chapel Hill photojournalism students who have taken a class within the last year. Local professional photojournalists have juried the assembled work, which documents scenes both locally and internationally.
- Nature Illustrated: Flora and Fauna of North Carolina (June 1 – September 5, 2006) – Work focused on the flora and fauna found across the state of North Carolina. 17 artists exhibited their varied works. Two education programs for area children were presented throughout the run of the exhibit.
- The Life and Writing of Robert Ruark (April 20 – July 23, 2006) – Robert Ruark was a journalist, author, world traveler, sportsman, syndicated columnist, and University of North Carolina at Chapel Hill alumnus who was known as a "poor man's Hemingway".

Chapel Hill Museum collaborated with the Robert Ruark Society of Chapel Hill and the UNC-Chapel Hill's Creative Writing department's second annual Robert Ruark Short Story Award ceremony to present the special exhibition documenting this journalist/novelists colorful life (1915–1965) and work. It included his works and many photographs.

- Lost and Found: 2006 Community ART Project (March 23 – May 15, 2006) – Chapel Hill Museum was the main venue for the Chapel Hill Public Arts Commission's third annual community-wide art project, on view throughout Chapel Hill and Carrboro.
- Triangle Black & White Photography (January 12 – March 19, 2006) – The Triangle Black and White Photography group is a collection of photographers who share a passion for conventional black-and-white photography and traditional printing methods utilizing wet darkroom technology. The collection of artwork was accompanied by a selection of vintage cameras on loan from Southeastern Camera and Supply of Carrboro, NC.
- The Transformation of Memorial Hall (September 8 . October 22, 2005) – This exhibit coincided with the reopening of Memorial Hall Auditorium, the museum presented an exhibition of photographs by Catharine Carter. It captured three years of renovation to the historic landmark on the campus of University of North Carolina at Chapel Hill.
- Battle Park: A Natural Space in Four Seasons (November 18, 2004 – March 13, 2005) – Chapel Hill photographer Tama Hochbaum documented the "wild yet slightly manicured" landscape found in UNC-Chapel Hill's Battle Park.

== Education Programs ==
Chapel Hill Museum's Education Committee has operated education programs since 1999. These programs are used by and provided free of charge to the Chapel Hill-Carrboro school district, home schooling collectives, and the public and private schools of Orange, Chatham, and Durham Counties. More than 3,500 students per year are served by Chapel Hill Museum's Education Committee's programs.

The museum's education programs are developed, implemented and maintained by volunteers. The Education Committee is made up of professional educators whose experience spans a range from elementary grade level through university professorships.

In 2005, the Education Committee was awarded the North Carolina Governor's Award for Outstanding Volunteer Service in recognition of the years of hard work, exceptional effort, and successful programs that have benefited thousands of children. All of the museum's education programs meet state-mandated curricular requirements for area educators.

=== Programs ===
==== Fire Safety & Puppet Musical ====
- Founded in 2000, this program is made up of 3 key parts:
  The puppets used in the puppet show "Johnnie Joins the Fire Department," based on teaching fire safety rules to children of all ages.
  - History and fire truck: Using the museum's exhibit Heroes of Yesterday, Heroes of Today: The History of the Chapel Hill Fire Department and the Town of Chapel Hill's original 1914 fire truck, which is housed at the museum, the program shows the contrast between the Chapel Hill Fire Department's inception in 1896 and the lives of present-day firefighters.
  - Puppet musical: Our musical puppet show Johnnie Joins the Fire Department uses the dramatic arts for the presentation, explanation, and repetition of life-saving fire safety rules. Special emphasis is made throughout the program to encourage families to make and practice a home fire escape plan.
  - Real firefighter: At the end of the program, students interact with a firefighter who demonstrates his or her turnout gear, air mask, tank, and tools – this segment is designed to reinforce the message that despite the frightening appearance of a firefighter in full gear, children should never hide in the event of a fire. Schools and community groups can schedule visits to the museum to see this program throughout October and the first two weeks of November. It also travels to family-friendly public venues year round.
- This program is included in the Chapel Hill-Carrboro School System goals and objectives for second grade. It also meets North Carolina second-grade curricular requirements related to theater arts and health and safety (fire safety), and emphasizes firefighters as community helpers.
- In August 2009, the show was made into a video, so it could touch the lives of even more people.
- On the basis of its Fire Department exhibit, website, and film, the museum won an honorable mention in the International Association of Fire Fighters 2008 Media Awards.

==== North Carolina Pottery and History of Pottery ====
- Developed for the eighth grade, this program uses examples from the museum's 300-piece pottery collection to interpret the culture and lives of North Carolinians from the mid-19th century through the present day.

==== The Lost Colony ====
- This fourth-grade history program is based on the work of author Paul Green and his symphonic outdoor drama The Lost Colony (play).
- The program presents the narrative of early North Carolina state history in conjunction with Green's work as a humanitarian and social activist. At the field trip's end, students perform an abbreviated and fully costumed rendition of Paul Green's "The Lost Colony."

==== Meet Me On Franklin Street ====
- Historically significant community leaders are featured in student-portrayed dramatic presentations.
- This program answers third-grade curriculum requirements by teaching area students about the history of their immediate community.

== Photo Galleries ==
The Front Entrance

The West Gallery

The East Gallery

The Gift Shop
