= Hargraves Community Center =

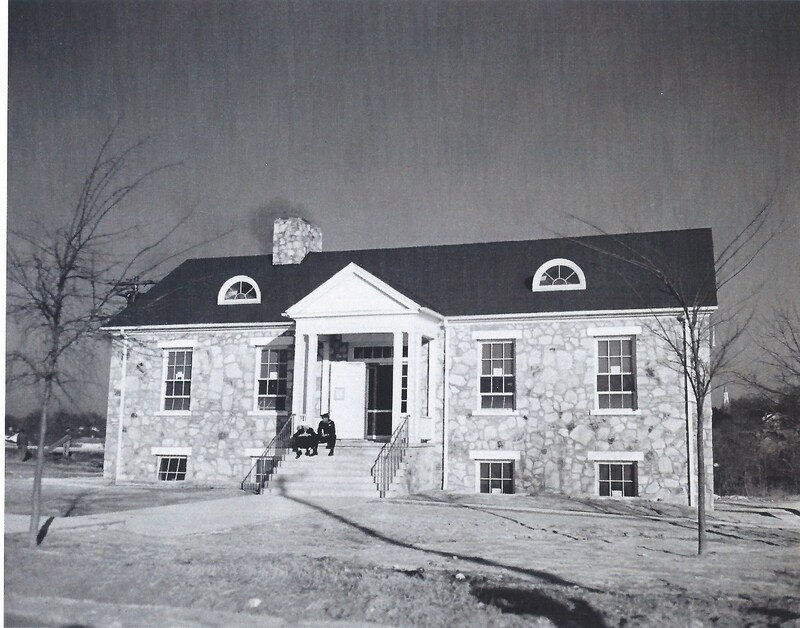
- Hargraves Center c. 1942
- Interactive map of the Hargraves Community Center area
- Former names: Negro Community Center; Roberson Street Center

General information
- Location: 216 North Roberson St, Chapel Hill, NC
- Coordinates: 35°54′46.368″N 79°3′49.824″W

The Hargraves Community Center, originally known as the Negro Community Center, is a historic site located at 216 North Roberson Street in Chapel Hill, North Carolina. In July 1940, the land was deeded to the town of Chapel Hill to create a community center for Black residents.

In 1973, the center was posthumously renamed after William M. Hargraves, a former member of the Parks and Recreation Commission who played a pivotal role in implementing several programs at the Hargraves Center that greatly benefited the community.

Today, the center provides a variety of outdoor facilities, including a pool, softball field, tennis courts, volleyball courts, a picnic shelter, and playground. Other amenities include meeting spaces for community organizations, a game room, computer lab, and a variety of after school programs for youth.

== History ==
=== Early Planning ===
During the Jim Crow era of the early 20th century, the town of Chapel Hill enforced systemic racial discrimination through both legal and de facto practices. These measures restricted the social mobility of Black individuals to specific neighborhoods during the evening. Furthermore, Black community gatherings were routinely shut down. As a result of these social barriers, Chapel Hill's Black community lacked access to safe spaces for recreational activity and social gatherings.

In August 1937, a racial conflict occurred, spurred by grievances over unemployment patterns among the Black and White working class and the disproportionate lack of public services for the Black community. The conflict began after a White man hit Tom Atwater, a Black man, in the head with a beer bottle, prompting a crowd of 300 Black community members to protest the display of racially motivated violence. However, the Chapel Hill and Durham police departments responded with gunfire and tear gas, injuring 5-10 individuals. This conflict is sometimes referred to as the Chapel Hill race riot. However, the term “race riot” is often considered to be deliberately misleading and rooted in white supremacy, as it is commonly used to distort historical narratives by placing blame on Black communities rather than white instigators. As a result of growing social unrest, the Negro Civic Club, an activist group advocating for racial equality between the 1920s-40s, addressed the racial disparities and advanced the idea of a recreation center for the Black Chapel Hill community. This led to Black leadership collaborating with town officials to facilitate the construction of a recreation center for the Black community, now known as the Hargraves Community Center.

In August 1942 the Navy's Carolina Flight School's All-Negro Band arrived to Chapel Hill. The 40-man unit was made of sailors from all over the state. After being made a permanent addition to the flight school, the band played at naval functions. After being denied housing on campus because of their race, it was decided that the members would take up residence in the Negro Community Center.

The band needed somewhere to stay, so the project was halted and the Navy preflight school was placed on the University of North Carolina at Chapel Hill's campus.

Original plans for the center included the following facilities for the benefit of the Black community: a nursery for working mothers, spaces for social recreation, assemblies, and club gatherings, a kitchen, a nurse’s office, showers, and workshop for young men to learn the craft and trade of woodworking.

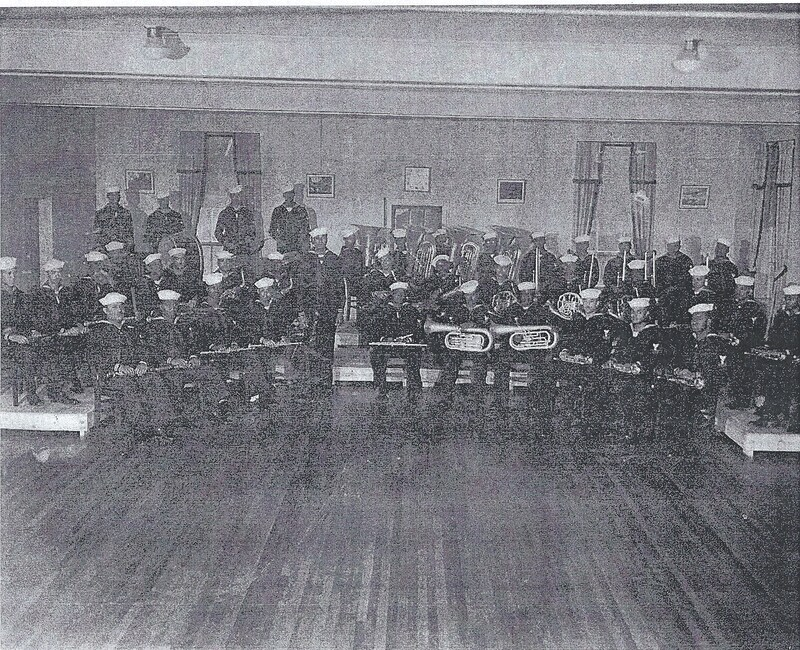
Picture of the Navy B-1 Band during their position at the Hargraves Center in Chapel Hill, NC.

=== Phase One Construction ===
On September 8, 1939, a group of ten citizens acquired a bank loan which facilitated the purchase of a five-acre land tract for $1600, stemming from broader community efforts to construct a social and recreational center for the Black community. The deed was then transferred to the town of Chapel Hill on July 29, 1940. The Works Progress Administration (WPA), a New Deal agency, initially offered $12,300 to fund the construction of the center. By November 1940, a total of $1,500 was additionally donated by the Chapel Hill community. By February 1942, the WPA grant rose to $16,000, however, due to the onset of World War II, the remainder of construction costs would depend on bank loans, credit, and additional community support. Among the donors were 400 Black and White local residents, and nonlocal alumni from the University of North Carolina, Chapel Hill, collectively raising a total of $5,950. Of this total, $5,641 came from White citizens and the university alumni. While $309 came from the Black community, their contributions exceeded monetary value, where skilled workers in the Black community, including masons and carpenters, contributed their labor in place of donations. News reports referred to the striking quality of the building’s construction.

Construction of the center officially began in January 1941. The project was led by architects Clarence Webb and Charles Craig, who supervised a crew of more than 20 skilled workers. However, the project came to a halt around May 1941 after the WPA grant was withdrawn due the onset of World War II. In 1942, when UNC Chapel Hill was selected as a site for one of the Navy’s four new pre-flight schools, it was determined that it would be joined by a unit band. Though all of the pre-flight candidates were white, the accompanying band, formally known as the Navy B-1 Band, was made entirely of Black musicians for the first time in the Navy’s history. When identifying segregated housing accommodations for the B-1 band, an agreement was made between the University, the Navy, and the town of Chapel Hill. In exchange for offering up the Negro Community Center as a temporary housing quarters for the B-1 Band, the Navy agreed to complete construction of the center, furnish the soldier’s sleeping quarters, and pay the town for a rental fee. During the time when it was occupied, the soldier’s sleeping quarters and dining areas were arranged in a way that allowed for the continued use of the building as a recreational center for community members. In May 1942, the B-1 Navy Band officially took up residence at the community center after being denied quarters at the University of North Carolina at Chapel Hill on the basis of their race. The community center was officially completed in 1945.

=== Post-World War II ===
Following the finished construction of the center, the Chapel Hill NAACP held their first meeting in 1947, serving as a historic achievement for advocacy and community organizing for racial equality.

In February 1951, Lucille Caldwell was hired as the first paid director of the center and North Carolina’s first African American to work as a professional recreational administrator. She worked at the center for twelve years, resigning in 1963. In 1960, Dr. Martin Luther King Jr. visited Chapel Hill, where he spoke at various locations throughout Chapel Hill, including the University Baptist Church, Hill Hall, and the Hargraves Center. Dr. King’s visit took place shortly after several civil rights demonstrations to promote racial equality. In February 1960, nine Black students from Lincoln High School (formerly known as the Orange County Training School) in Chapel Hill, coined the Chapel Hill Nine, staged a sit-in at the Colonial Drug Store, a business that refused to service Black customers. As a result of the Chapel Hill Nine, both the size and scope of protests in Chapel Hill grew, inspiring a decade of resistance against segregation and racial discrimination as a whole. Furthermore, Dr. King’s visit also took place shortly after the Greensboro sit-ins, where a group of Black students coordinated a nonviolent sit-in protest at Woolworths, a store that refused to serve lunch to Black individuals. This sit-in similarly marked a historic civil rights demonstration in the Civil Rights Movement. During his speeches, Dr. King spoke on the ongoing struggles for racial equality, spurred by the civil rights movement gaining traction across the United States and in Chapel Hill.

The center underwent numerous structural developments. In June 1961, the center opened the A.D Clark Pool, providing a safe and accessible swimming space for the Black community during the era of segregation. Named in honor of Adolphus D. Clark, the first president of the Chapel Hill NAACP, the pool’s construction was financed through donations from Black businesses and community members alongside a $40,000 donation from Cornelia S. Love, an employee at Wilson Library at the University of North Carolina at Chapel Hill and longtime coworker of Clark. Local Black masons and concrete builders contributed to the construction of the pool throughout 1960 before it officially opened to public recreational use in June 1961.

On February 5, 1973, William Hargraves, a former member of the Parks and Recreation Committee, passed away from injuries sustained during a motorcycle accident. As a result, the center was renamed in honor of Hargraves, who further served as a leader in spearheading advocacy efforts for the center and the Black community as a whole.

In 1978, the Town of Chapel Hill's acquisition of land south of the Center led to the construction of tennis courts. Two years later, the center underwent significant renovation and expansion, including the creation of a 1,500 sq. ft. auditorium.

Throughout the 1990s, the center obtained funding for the construction of a gymnasium from the 1989 Parks and Recreation Commission Bond, an insurance settlement, and government funding from Orange County. However, the project stalled in the wake of a $400,000 budget deficit. Despite this setback, the Chapel Hill Town Council voted to issue over $400,000 in bonds from the 1996 Parks and Recreation Commission budget to complete the construction of the gymnasium at the center, which opened to the public on June 15, 1998.

=== 21st Century ===
The Hargraves Center continues to provide after-school programs and events designed to maintain community ties within Chapel Hill. However, Northside—one of Chapel Hill’s historically Black neighborhoods—has witnessed an influx of gentrification in recent decades as developers purchase homes to lease as off-campus housing for students at the University of North Carolina at Chapel Hill. As the neighborhood risks an erosion of historical identity, the center remains an important space for social and recreational gathering, and a landmark for Chapel Hill’s Black community.

== See also ==
- Racial segregation in the United States
- Racial segregation in the United States Armed Forces
- Jim Crow laws
