= Chapel Hill Nine =

1960 protestors in North Carolina, US

Chapel Hill Nine Sit-in
- Part of the Civil Rights Movement
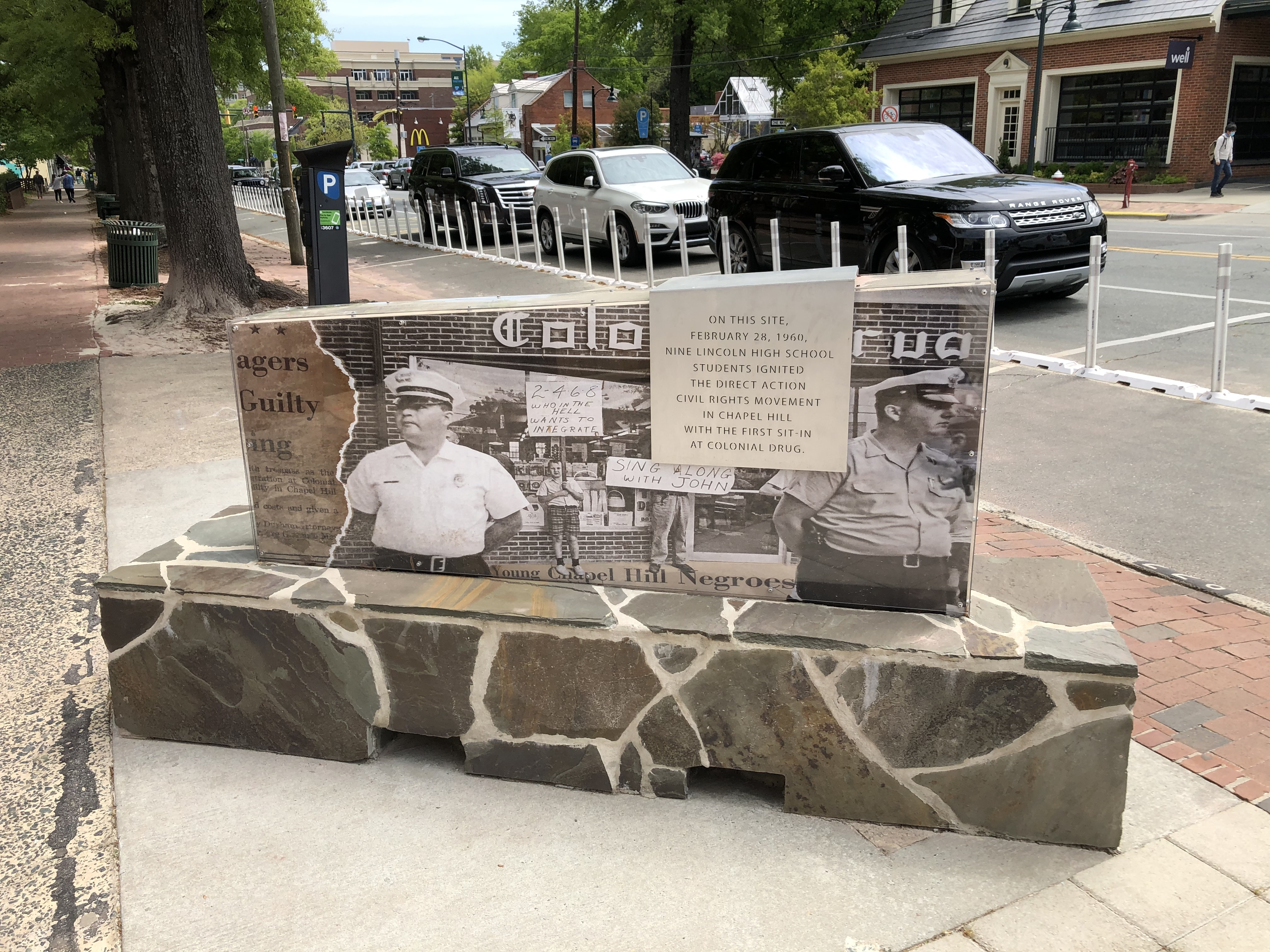
- Memorial of Chapel Hill Nine
- Date: February 28th, 1960
- Location: Colonial Drugstore in Chapel Hill, North Carolina
- Caused by: Racial segregation in public accommodations; inspiration from the Greensboro sit-ins

Parties
The Chapel Hill Nine	Colonial Drugstore; Chapel Hill Police Department

Lead figures
Chapel Hill Nine: Harold Foster; David Mason Jr.; William Cureton; John Farrington; Earl Geer; Clarence Merritt Jr.; James Merritt; Douglas Perry; Albert Williams	Colonial Drugstore owner: John Carswell

The Chapel Hill Nine were a group of nine African American high school students from Lincoln High School (Chapel Hill, North Carolina), who staged a sit-in at the Colonial Drugstore on February 28, 1960, during the Civil Rights Movement. Heavily inspired by another civil rights protest, the Greensboro sit-ins, the nine students challenged the segregation policy at the Colonial Drugstore by peacefully occupying seats at a whites-only lunch counter.

The sit-in by the Chapel Hill Nine was one of the earliest protests for civil rights in the town's history and encouraged other desegregation efforts in Chapel Hill and beyond. Though the students were arrested and charged with trespassing, as well as fined $10, their actions drew public attention to the injustices of the Jim Crow Laws and inspired further activism within the community. Chapel Hill's segregation laws were removed with the passage of the Civil Rights Act in 1964. The Chapel Hill Nine's courage was later recognized by the town of Chapel Hill and the University of North Carolina through commemorative events, public memorials, and educational initiatives.

== The Sit-In and members ==
In 1960, public schools were still segregated, and Black grade school students in Chapel Hill attended Lincoln High School (Chapel Hill, North Carolina). Several students from the Lincoln High School basketball team consistently visited the Colonial Drugstore on West Franklin Street to drink sodas, so on February, after a big win, Harold Foster and his teammates decided to go to the Colonial Drugstore. Black customers were allowed to purchase sodas from the store, but were not allowed to sit at the bar. Harold Foster and eight other students, David Mason Jr., William Cureton, John Farrington, Earl Geer, Clarence Merritt Jr., James Merritt, Douglas Perry, and Albert Williams, decided on this day to stage a sit-in, inspired by the Greensboro sit-ins, as a direct protest against the store's policy. The nine students sat down at the counter until the owner told them to leave. Harold Foster was 18 at the time and served as captain of both the basketball and football teams, as well as editor of the yearbook for Lincoln High School. He was recognized as a leader who initiated the effort to combat segregation and discrimination in Chapel Hill. The other members of the sit-in group were well-connected to Chapel Hill's Black community (David Mason Jr. was the nephew of Charlie Mason who owned a grocery store and Mason's Motel).

== Legacy ==
The sit-in led by the Chapel Hill Nine had a large effect in both the Chapel Hill community and the broader civil rights movement in North Carolina. After refusing to leave the Colonial Drugstore, all nine students were arrested and charged with trespassing. The high schoolers' actions were recognized in the area as emphasizing the growing commitment of African Americans fighting systemic injustice through nonviolent protest.

While their protest did not lead to immediate desegregation of the Colonial Drugstore, the sit-in sparked a ripple effect of civil rights activism throughout Chapel Hill such as the 350 citizen integrated public march in May 1963, the massive demonstrations in February 1964, and other acts of protest. The protest drew attention to the inequalities Black people faced in public accommodations and encouraged combating racial discrimination. As Albert Williams later reflected, "I would like to be remembered as a participant who tried to make a change and set an example".

Despite facing legal consequences, the students' actions helped shift public opinion and energize future protests. Their defiance contributed to the gradual dismantling of segregation in Chapel Hill, particularly in downtown businesses that had long refused service to Black people. Over the following years, these demonstrations and boycotts led by students and residents caused a violent reaction from Chapel Hill Police and many businesses retained segregated facilities. There was a town effort to pass a public accommodations ordinance through a march dubbed "A Walk for Freedom" from Durham to Chapel Hill, but it was narrowly defeated by the Chapel Hill Board of Alderman, resulting in businesses being formally segregated until the passage of the Civil Rights Act in 1964. Esphur Foster, sister of the Chapel Hill Nine Member Harold Foster, says "We remind you that the tussle continues", to highlight that this fight is still ongoing.

In 2017, the mayor of Chapel Hill, Pam Hemminger, formed the Historic Civil Rights Commemoration Task Force to honor the history of the Civil Rights Movement in Chapel Hill. While the impact of the sit-in remained largely unacknowledged for decades, there were several celebrations and commemorations for the Chapel Hill Nine in the late 2010s and early 2020s as a result of the Historic Civil Rights Commemoration Task Force. In 2017, on November 30, the Chapel Hill Public Library invited the community to gather and celebrate their launch of Opening Our Future, which was an exhibit about the civil rights period of Chapel Hill's history. This was designed to encourage the community to find and share stories that have not been fully told. In 2019, the Town Council approved the construction of a marker to commemorate the protestors. The marker was designed by Durham artist Stephen Hayes and incorporates documentary photographs, the names and ages of the participants, and stone motifs reference the walls of the historically black Northside neighborhood, where much of the local civil rights organizing took place. The Chapel Hill Nine were eventually commemorated with a permanent historical marker in downtown Chapel Hill in 2020, on the 60th anniversary of the sit-in.
