= Halloween on Franklin Street =

Halloween celebration in Chapel Hill, North Carolina

Coordinates: 35.913°N 79.055°W

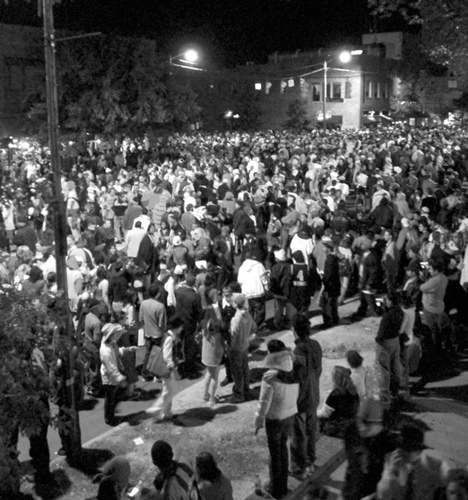
Crowd of people walking through Franklin Street on Halloween.

Halloween on Franklin Street is a yearly tradition in Chapel Hill, North Carolina, that encompasses a massive gathering on Franklin Street, the cultural hub of the town. The Halloween celebration began in the early 1980s as a considerably smaller event, involving Chapel Hill residents and college students from The University of North Carolina. Attendees of the event dress up in creative Halloween costumes and walk up and down Franklin Street celebrating the holiday. Since its beginnings, the event had grown in size every year until 2008. Although not sponsored by the Town of Chapel Hill, the celebration has become an attraction for visitors from across the South. Between 2004 and 2007, it was estimated that about 80,000 people converged on Franklin Street for the event, while Chapel Hill is estimated to have a population of 54,492 as listed in the 2007 census, evidence of the number of people who make the trip to Chapel Hill to attend. Because of the size of the celebration, the Town of Chapel Hill closes Franklin Street to all vehicular traffic and prohibits parking anywhere near downtown. Along with the big crowds come safety issues, with some of the biggest concerns being alcohol poisoning and gang-related violence. To deal with these issues, hundreds of police officers patrol the downtown area throughout the entire night. In 2007, approximately 400 police officers were deployed to Franklin Street to ensure that nothing got out of hand. In 2008, the Town of Chapel Hill implemented new measures to attempt to cut down on the size of the Halloween celebration in an action dubbed "Homegrown Halloween" to reduce the crowd size and discourage people from out of town from coming to Chapel Hill. The shuttle service that had formerly transported people from park and ride lots to Franklin Street was shut down and the results of Chapel Hill's efforts showed when about 35,000 people showed up for the event.

Among the alternatives to the traditional Franklin Street celebration are the Halloween-themed planetarium shows at Morehead Planetarium and Science Center , which include two versions of "Scare-o-lina Skies", one for families with school-age children and one for adults and older teens. The planetarium closes by mid-afternoon on Halloween because the adjacent parking lot becomes a staging area for public safety vehicles serving the Franklin Street nighttime celebration.

== Security ==
For the Town of Chapel Hill, one of the biggest concerns during the event is safety. With crowds of up to 80,000 people, security measures can be difficult to implement, with two of the biggest issues being binge drinking and gang-related activities. Although the celebration is not a town-sponsored event, on average, officials call for around 400 law enforcement officers to control crowds and patrol the streets. During the 2008 celebration, along with other new security measures, officials required bars and restaurants in the downtown area to stop selling alcohol and close their doors at 1:00 a.m. Another action taken by town officials meant to help curb drinking was that of requiring all bars in the downtown area to charge patrons a five-dollar cover charge to get in. Police began clearing the streets at midnight and made only five arrests throughout the event, down from thirteen arrests at the 2007 celebration.

== Prohibited items ==
- Paint
- Glass bottles
- Fireworks
- Coolers
- Animals
- Fake weapons (Part of Costumes)

== Costumes ==
One of the most popular elements of Halloween on Franklin Street is the originality of the costumes of attendees. People that attend this event (including many students from The University of North Carolina at Chapel Hill) strive for the most unusual costumes possible. Notable costumes from the 2008 celebration included the Joker from The Dark Knight and a Tetris-themed group costume. According to the UNC-based student newspaper, The Daily Tar Heel, for students, "Halloween is an opportunity to express their creativity and become a different person for one night".
