= Hackney School =

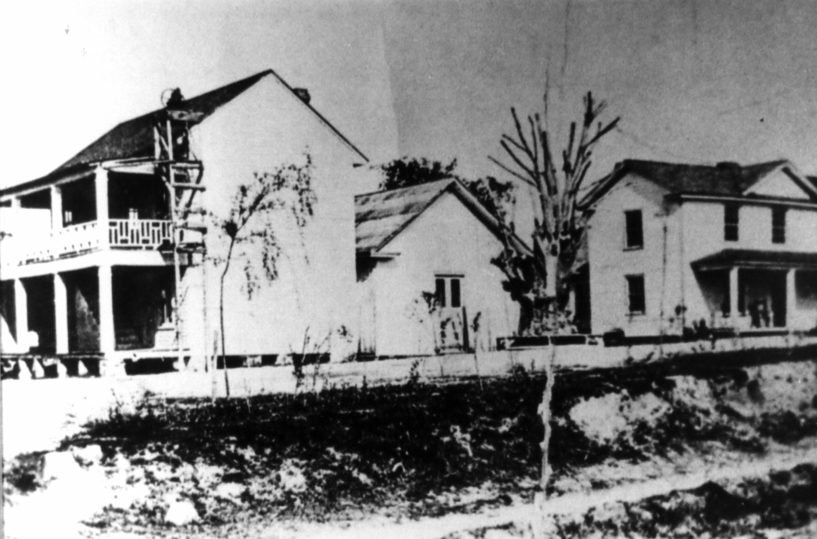

Location
- Merritt Mill Road; Chapel Hill, Orange County, North Carolina
- Coordinates: 35.908353°N 79.064513°W

Information
- Other names: Hackney’s Educational and Industrial School, Hackney High School, "Hack’s High"
- School type: Private secondary school
- Established: c. 1913
- Founder: Louis H. Hackney
- Closed: 1916
- Enrollment: Approximately 200 Students

The Hackney School was a private secondary school for older Black students in Chapel Hill, North Carolina that was open from 1913 to 1916. It later merged with the Quaker Freedman School to form the Orange County Training School.

== History ==
Established in Chapel Hill in 1913, The Hackney School went by several names, including Hackney's Educational and Industrial School, Hackney High School, and "Hack's High." Its namesake, Louis H. Hackney, served as the pastor of Rock Hill Baptist Church in the late 1800s and was the principal of the nearby Quaker School from 1898 to 1912. These roles allowed him to establish a firm leadership position within the Chapel Hill community. Hackney was able to use this influence to obtain funding from local black families who were frustrated with the lack of secondary education available to young black students. On May 22, 1913, Louis H. Hackney and his wife Lara purchased a piece of land just south of the Quaker School from the Bane family, and west of Merritt Mill Road. This was where the Hackney School was built. The school served as a private institution for Black children who were previously not able to attend school past the seventh grade. The student body consisted of approximately 200 students.

Unlike Quaker Freedmen School, which taught grades one through seven and was open from October to March, the Hackney School was established to give African American children access to sustained quality education for longer portions of the year. Despite the considerable benefits the school offered to Black children in Chapel Hill, funding became increasingly problematic for the institution. As a result, Hackney was approached by the Orange County Board of Directors with the idea to combine the Hackney School and the Quaker Freedmen School to become one unified institution. He agreed, and in 1916, he sold both the school and the land to Orange County. Students from the Hackney School and Quaker Freedmen School, many of whom went on to become teachers, were educated at the original Orange County Training School.

== Cultural significance ==
=== Louis Hackney, founder ===
Louis H. Hackney was born in 1854 in Chatham County and died on December 19, 1937, in Chapel Hill. Born to enslaved parents, Hackney moved to Chapel Hill in his early twenties to serve as a pastor at Rock Hill Baptist Church, which is today called First Baptist Church. He served there for 60 years, from 1877 to 1937. Additionally, he pastored at New Hope Missionary Baptist Church in Apex, NC and Mt. Zion Baptist Church in Chatham County, NC. Despite the great barriers that existed to prevent Black North Carolinians from obtaining an education, Hackney graduated from Shaw University in 1892, and later received a doctorate degree. He went on to use his educational background to expand opportunities for Black students in Chapel Hill. He married Lara A. Edwards on October 21, 1876, and they had two children.

Hackney's experience as an educator began as principal of the Quaker Freedmen School between 1898 and 1912. He went on to found the Hackney School to provide education for Black students beyond 7th grade, as the public school system did not provide such an opportunity. Hackney worked at the school himself, and served as its principal and one of the two history teachers. As a result of a lack of funding, Hackney sold the property for $2300. In 1916, after three years of operation, the Hackney School merged with Quaker Freedmen School to become the Orange County Training School.

Despite widespread racial discrimination at the time, Hackney amassed enough wealth to acquire and own land from 1878 until he died in 1937. Records state that he also sold land to the University of North Carolina at Chapel Hill in 1921. Hackney's educational experience, wealth, and community ties gave him a unique position that allowed him to increase opportunities for Black Chapel Hillians.

=== Role in the community ===
During the early twentieth century, there were abundant efforts to exclude African American children from secondary educational institutions in Chapel Hill. North Carolina Public Laws explicitly held that any children with African American ancestry should solely attend schools provided for the "colored race." The resulting educational disparity was only furthered when the Chapel Hill Special Tax District's boundaries were drawn to purposefully exclude the black neighborhoods, a measure made possible by the segregated housing patterns in Chapel Hill. The trustees that drew these boundaries intended to establish a system of white education with no provisions for the Black children of the area, and the University of North Carolina at Chapel Hill community offered no tax support toward the education of the children of the Black laborers that helped to maintain the university. While the Quaker School for Freedmen offered schooling to Black children in grades one through seven, discontent quickly rose in the community over the lack of secondary education for Chapel Hill's Black students. This discontent spurred Hackney to start the private institution of the Hackney School as an effort to fill this gap in education for the Black community of Chapel Hill. The Hackney School was supported by a wide variety of staff consisting of community members. The school's Board of Trustees included Thomas L. McDade, Edward Allen, E. B. Jones, S. J. Caldwell, William McDade, and George McCauley. Additionally, teachers at the school included “Jessie O'Kelley (domestic science), Amy Rogers (music), Carrie Jones (history), and Jim Rogers (arithmetic),” alongside Hackney who served as both the principal and the school's second history teacher. By creating this opportunity and serving the community in this manner, Hackney began a long line of efforts prior to desegregation to ensure secondary education remained available to the Black students of Chapel Hill. Later institutions included Orange Country Training School and Lincoln High School.
