= Colonial Drugstore =

General information
- Architectural style: Colonial Revival
- Location: 450 W. Franklin Street, Chapel Hill, North Carolina, 450 W. Franklin Street, Chapel Hill, NC, 27514, Chapel Hill, North Carolina, United States
- Coordinates: 35°54′39″N 79°3′44″W
- Opened: 1951
- Closed: 1996
- Owner: John Carswell

Design and construction
- Known for: Civil Rights Protests

The Colonial Drugstore, located at 450 West Franklin Street, Chapel Hill, NC, opened in 1951 and closed in 1996. It was a store and restaurant and the site of a pivotal 1960 civil rights sit-in by the Chapel Hill Nine, challenging segregation in Chapel Hill in 1960.

== History ==
John Carswell, a University of North Carolina at Chapel Hill alumnus, opened The Colonial Drugstore in 1951. The store was known for its fountain drinks, which it would serve to locals and UNC students. The Colonial Drugstore was also the location for the Chapel Hill Nine sit-in in 1960 to protest for civil rights. After the sit-in, there were over 100 black youths who picketed the store in solidarity with the Chapel Hill Nine and other movements during the Civil Rights Era.

The Colonial Drugstore was located at 450 West Franklin Street and was constructed with the Neocolonial Revival architecture style. The store closed in 1996. Two businesses have since occupied the building. West End Wine Bar opened in 1997 but was replaced in 2021 by The Story, a bar and event venue.

== The 1960 Sit-In and Civil Rights Movement ==
Nine students from Lincoln High School, a local all black high school in Chapel Hill, staged a sit-in in the segregated Colonial Drugstore located on Franklin Street. The Colonial Drugstore, located on West Franklin Street near several historically Black neighborhoods, served mainly Black customers, but disallowed them from dining in. The sit-in did not result from any formal planning. Harold Foster, one of the Chapel Hill Nine, recalled this protest as "very impromptu, spontaneous". Inspired by the Greensboro sit-in that had occurred four weeks prior, the nine young men decided to sit down at the Colonial Drugstore and refuse to leave. After the sit-in, the boys were fined $10 (around $110 today when adjusted for inflation), and all except one appealed their sentences, where three of the boys attested on their own behalf. They were found guilty of trespassing and were given a suspended 30-day jail sentence.

John Carswell, the owner of the Colonial Drugstore, did not believe that the sit-in was an authentic representation of how the black community of Chapel Hill felt. He believed that the students were convinced to do this sit-in by an outsider who was a “communist agitator” from Berkeley, CA. Carswell believed the community turned against him despite his belief that he treated them well compared to the other businesses.

The sit-ins inspired a series of parallel demonstrations in nearby businesses on West Franklin Street. This resulted in some businesses removing their restrictions on black residents or integrating all together. Two other businesses in the area, the Bus Station Grill and the Dairy Bar, removed their lunch counter stools that were previously not open to black patrons. Another business, The Village Pharmacy, integrated its booths. Further, five more restaurants agreed to serve black UNC students following consultations with the Mayor's Human Relations Committee and the Chapel Hill Board of Aldermen. The majority of restaurants and lunch counters, however, remained completely segregated. Yet, after July 1960, Civil Rights activity in Chapel Hill was limited until April 1963. From July 1960 to the beginning of 1963, there were no further arrests related to Civil Rights activity.

Sit-ins and other protests continued to occur outside the Colonial Drugstore in spring 1963. In response to growing resentment towards the Colonial Drugstore from civil rights activists in the area, Carswell published an advertisement for his business in the local newspaper Chapel Hill Weekly, in an editorial titled Peddlers of Hysteria, which framed the sit-in and broader civil rights activism as misguided hysteria, dismissing calls for integration as a threat to private enterprise and traditional American values.

Sit-ins had occurred in North Carolina as early as 1943, but they went relatively unnoticed until the widespread usage in 1960. In May 1960, Martin Luther King Jr. visited Chapel Hill to speak about civil rights. During the effort to pass public accommodations in early 1964, the town council of Chapel Hill denied its passage, and restaurants and businesses stayed formally segregated until the Civil Rights Act was passed later that year.

== Closure ==
After the initial closure of Colonial Drugstore in 1996, West End Wine Bar, a new restaurant, took its place. West End Bar had its grand opening in 1996 and remained open until the COVID-19 pandemic, when it was forced to close down until further notice. As the pandemic restrictions were lifted in the Chapel Hill area, allowing for businesses to reopen to the public, a new restaurant had replaced West End Wine Bar. Jamil Kadoura, owner of the nearby Mediterranean Deli, purchased the former West End Wine Bar. In 2021, he opened The Story, naming it in honor of the Chapel Hill Nine sit-in.

== Legacy and Cultural Impact ==
The sit-in at the Colonial Drugstore marked a pivotal moment in Chapel Hill's civil rights movement, catalyzing a broader wave of protest and resistance throughout the town. Sparked by the courage of the Chapel Hill Nine, the Colonial Drugstore demonstration inspired additional sit-ins and acts of civil disobedience, including the arrest of nearly 200 protesters across subsequent events. Among these were eight individuals arrested for blocking the sidewalk in front of the Tar Heel Sandwich Shop on Franklin Street. At Carlton's Rock Pile, another site of protest, demonstrators who were denied service sat on the floor in defiance. In response, the store's owner, Carlton Mize, locked the doors and poured ammonia and Clorox on the protesters—an act that left some with chemical burns and others hospitalized. While several protesters were arrested, Mize was never prosecuted. Although the Civil Rights Act of 1964 had been passed, the legacy of the Colonial Drugstore sit-in illustrates that legal reform did not immediately eliminate acts of discrimination and violence in Chapel Hill. The ongoing resistance following the sit-in reflects both the courage it inspired and the persistent barriers to justice that remained.

=== Chapel Hill Nine Marker ===
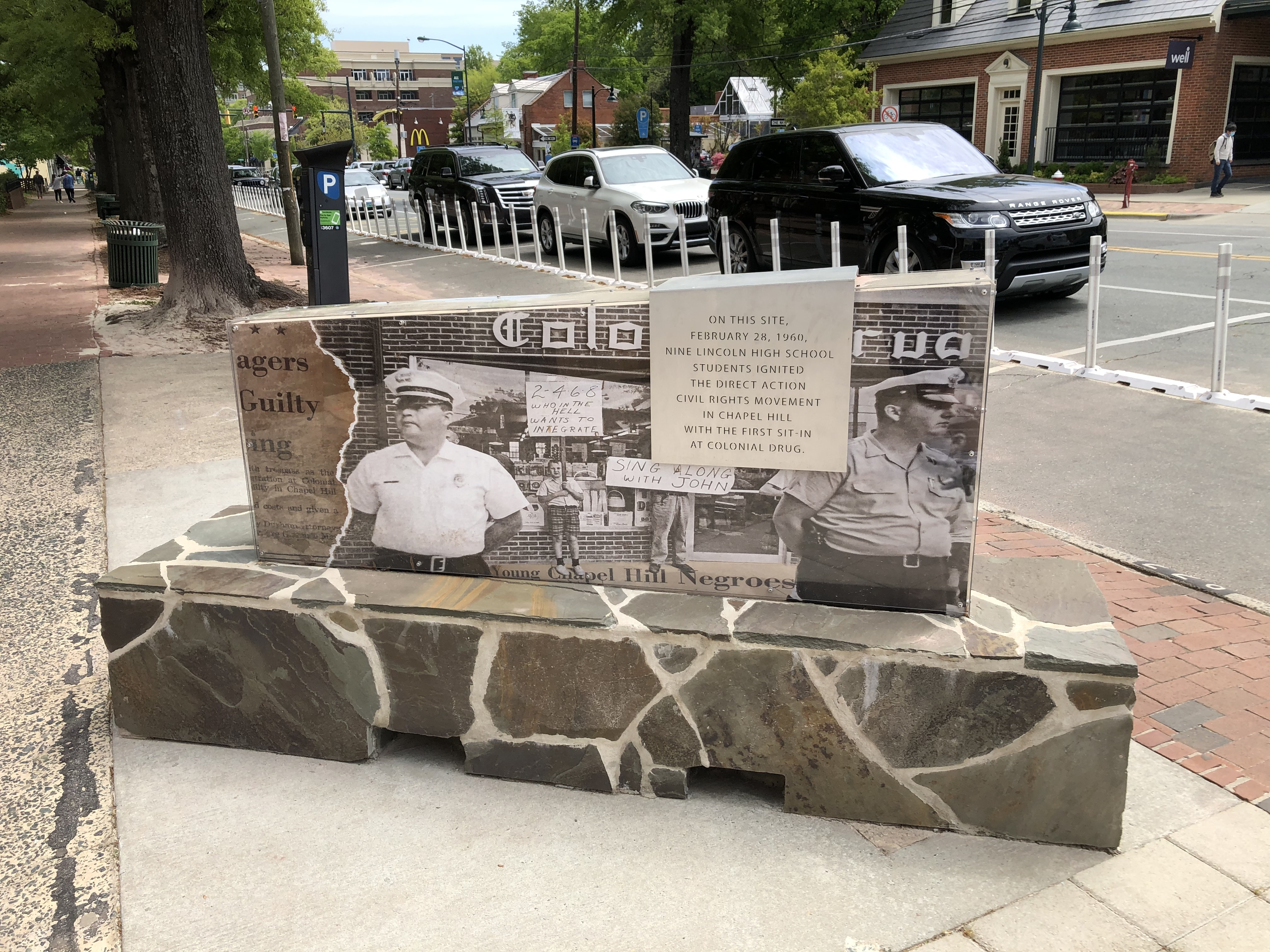
Chapel Hill Nine Marker

On February 28, 2020, during the 60th anniversary of the Colonial Drugstore sit-in, the Town of Chapel Hill added bus shelter designs and a permanent historical marker to honor the Chapel Hill Nine. The permanent marker is located right outside of the Colonial Drugstore, currently known as The Story. Designed by Stephen Hayes from Durham, NC, he took inspiration from public art and historical monuments to create this piece. The base of the marker is made of rough-cut stone that resembles the low walls of the historically black Northside neighborhood., featuring a black and white collage sitting above it. It includes archival images of police officers, civil rights-era storefront signage, and news clippings referencing the protests and arrests of the Chapel Hill Nine. The central plaque includes an inscription titled:

“On this site, February 28, 1960, nine Lincoln High School students ignited the direct action Civil Rights Movement in Chapel Hill with the first sit-in at Colonial Drug.”

The back of the central plaque includes an inscription of the names of each of the nine members of the Chapel Hill Nine. Three of the four surviving members of the Chapel Hill Nine stated they hadn't visited the site in over 59 years, vowing to never return after being turned away. This changed when all four members were present for the unveiling ceremony of the Chapel Hill Nine Marker.

== See also ==
- Greensboro Sit-ins
- List of Historic Sites in Orange County
