= St. Paul AME Church (Chapel Hill, North Carolina) =

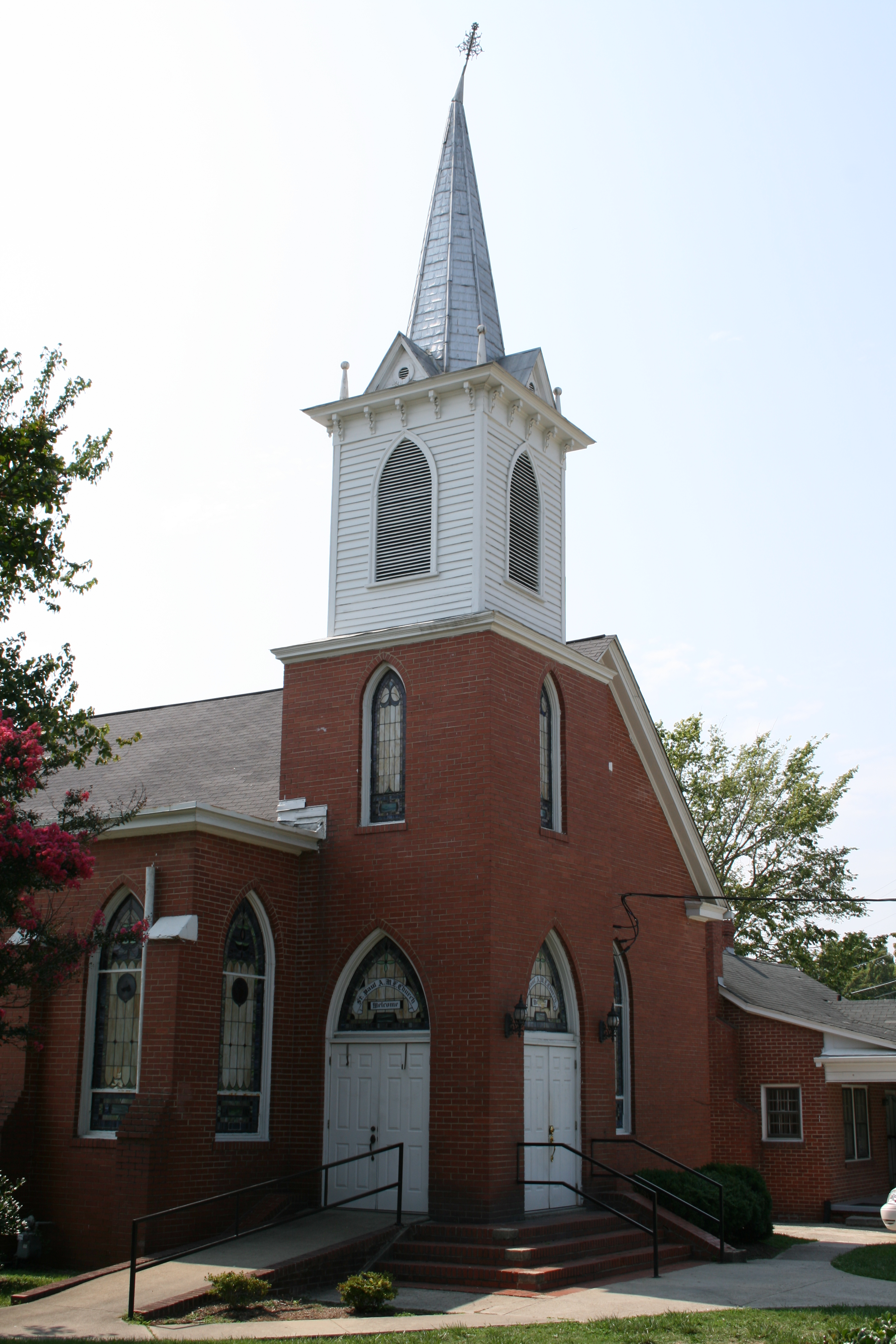
- St. Paul Church (Bent Spire)

- Location within North Carolina Location within the United States
- Location: 101 N. Merritt Mill Rd., Chapel Hill, North Carolina
- Coordinates: 35°54′36.13″N 79°03′55.83″W
- Built: 1892

St. Paul A.M.E. Church is a church building in the second district of the African Methodist Episcopal Church (AME) in Chapel Hill, North Carolina in the United States. Being the first black church in the area, it is the spiritual home to numerous communicants, including numerous students studying at the University of North Carolina at Chapel Hill.

== History ==
=== Origins ===
In 1864, William Thompson, J. Craig, Charles Craig, Kenny Brooks, Charles H. Johnson, C.E.H. Johnson, Green Merritt, and Green Cordal founded a Black Methodist Church, under the leadership of Edwin Allen and Jerry Hargraves. The first service, held by Rev. Green Cordal, was attended by people of African American and Native American descent and took place on December 26, 1864.

In 1870, St. Paul was officially accepted into the African Methodist Episcopal Church System, headquartered in Philadelphia. The property on which the church sits today was originally bought on April 15, 1878, from Benjamin and Dilsy Craig for $55. The purchased land previously housed the Orange Country Training School. The training school was converted into a private freedman's school in 1968 on a property adjacent to St. Paul AME Church. The original church building was a log cabin constructed by its members on Merritt Mill Road in 1878. A new church building was constructed in 1892.

=== Renovations ===
St. Paul AME Church has expansion plans which expect to take ten years once the proposal is fully approved. The expansion is set to create a village called the St. Paul Village, proposed by Reverend Thomas O. Nixon.

In 2014, renovations were set to begin allowing the church to expand on a 48,000-square-foot piece of land. The groundbreaking ceremony was scheduled for October 2014, with construction expected to begin in late 2015 and an expected completion time of 2025.

=== Traditions ===
Each year St. Paul AME hosts an annual 5K benefit walk/ run with proceeds benefiting the St. Paul Village.

== Community outreach ==
St. Paul AME Church has several ministry options and ways to get involved including Vacation Bible school, young kids group reunions, youth group reunions, women's group reunions, and men's group reunions along with other church activities and gatherings. It is a member institution of Orange County Justice United. St. Paul AME was featured in a project to help preserve and engage with the history of the historic Chapel Hill and Carrboro neighborhoods of Northside, Pine Knolls, and Tin Top with the Marian Cheek Jackson Center and their oral history project From the Rock Wall.
