= Mason's Motel =

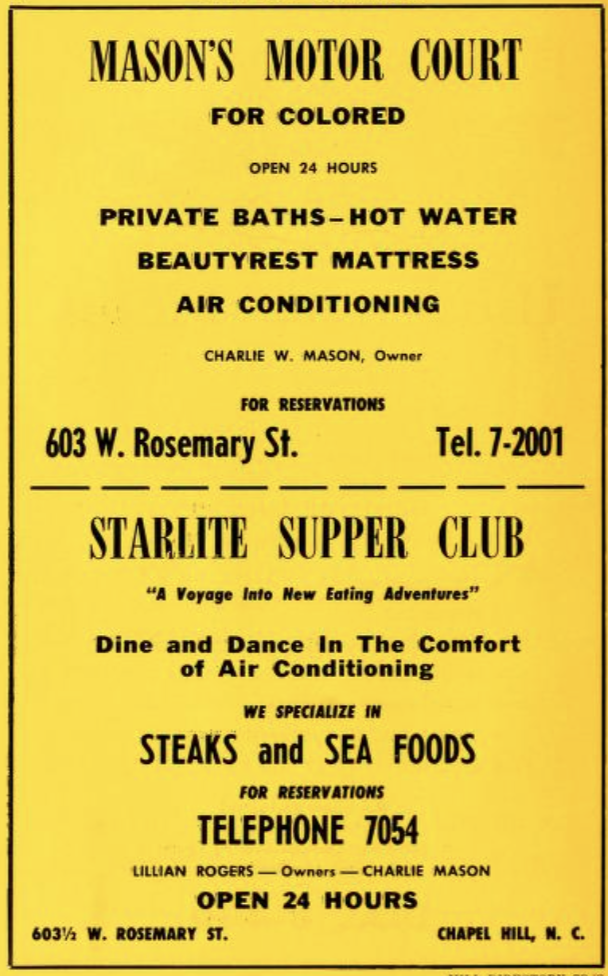
- Interactive map of Mason's Motel
- Alternative names: Mason's Motor Court

General information
- Location: 603 W. Rosemary Street, Chapel Hill, NC
- Coordinates: 35°54′39″N 79°3′55″W
- Opened: 1960
- Owner: Charlie Mason

Mason's Motel, also known as Mason's Motor Court, was a Black-owned motel located at 603 West Rosemary Street in Chapel Hill, North Carolina. Established in 1960 by Charlie Mason, it served as a vital accommodation for African American travelers during the era of segregation, when most local hotels denied lodging to Black guests. The motel became a cultural hub, hosting renowned Black entertainers, and is a significant piece of Chapel Hill's African American history.

== History ==
=== Founding and early operations ===
Mason's Motel was built and opened by Charlie Mason in 1960 on West Rosemary Street in Chapel Hill, North Carolina. At the time, it was one of the only motels in the area open to Black travelers during the Jim Crow era, when most white-owned establishments denied accommodations to Black guests. The motel also operated alongside the adjacent Starlite Supper Club (also known as the Starlite Lounge), which was an entertainment space also owned by Mason. This combination of lodging and entertainment services created a safe space for Black travelers and performers.

=== Historical significance ===
When Black musicians came to Chapel Hill to perform at the University of North Carolina at Chapel Hill during the era of segregation, many lodged at Mason's Motel. Such musicians included Ella Fitzgerald, Tina Turner, James Brown, and Dinah Washington, and some performed at the associated Starlite Supper Club during their stay. Mason's Motel functioned as a safe haven and social space during the Civil Rights era, as well as a prominent example of successful Black entrepreneurship in a time when that was far from the norm. Chapel Hill oral history archives point to the motel as a key element of the local Black community.

=== Decline and later use ===
Following the end of formal segregation and the rise of integrated lodging options, the use of Mason's Motel began to decline until it eventually closed (exact year unknown), and the building fell into disrepair. In 1987, the Mason Motel property, located at the corner of Merritt Mill Road and Rosemary Street, was proposed as a site for a homeless shelter by the Downtown Citizens Committee. The committee obtained a 60-day purchase option and presented preliminary renovation plans to the Chapel Hill Town Council. The proposal faced opposition from nearby residents and was ultimately not pursued. The Inter-Faith Council (IFC) confirmed that the site had previously been considered but was rejected due to space limitations, zoning issues, and neighborhood concerns.

Following this, the property was purchased by Esther Tate, a local developer whose plans for the site were never fully realized. The land was eventually sold to the developers of the Greenbridge condominium complex, which now occupies the site. The plaza in front of the building is named after Charlie Mason, in recognition of his contributions to Chapel Hill's Black community.

== See also ==
- African Americans in North Carolina
- Black-owned business
- List of motels
