= Tama Hochbaum =

American photographer (born 1953)

- Born: 1953 (age 72–73); New York City
- Education: Brandeis University, Queens College
- Website: www.tamahochbaum.com

Tama Hochbaum (born 1953) is an artist and photographer living in Chapel Hill, North Carolina.

== Life ==
Hochbaum was born in New York City, and received her BA from Brandeis University in Fine Arts. Upon graduation, she was awarded a Thomas J. Watson Foundation Fellowship to study printmaking at Atelier 17 in Paris. She later received a MFA in painting from Queens College in NYC in 1981.

She worked as a painter in Newton, Massachusetts for 20 years.

In 1991, during a four-month stay in Italy, an old interest in photography that had begun during her time in Paris re-emerged.

In 1996, she and her family moved to North Carolina, where she currently lives.

Hochbaum had a solo exhibition, "OVER/TIME: Imaging Landscape" at CAM (Contemporary Art Museum) Raleigh in 2018, as well as a solo exhibition of Self-Portraits, "As If A Mirror", at the Horace Williams House in Chapel Hill from October through December, 2023. Her most recent exhibit of self-portraits was mounted at 21C Museum Hotel in Durham, entitled: VISAGE, FLORA, FACET & BEVEL. In 2022, a production of Hildegard Von Bingen's Opera, Ordo Virtutum, was presented at CAM Raleigh which included over 90 video projections that Hochbaum created. She will be having an exhibition in Saarbrücken, Germany in the spring of 2026. She will be the featured artist at FRANK Gallery for the CLICK 2025 Festival. She has been commissioned to create a 35-minute video consisting of her images to be projected while a string quartet plays the music of Chou Wen-cheung for the "Festival on the Hill" in Chapel Hill for the Spring, 2026 season.

== Process ==
Hochbaum has been interested in making work about the passage of time as she does in a recent portfolio of self-portraits titled "As If A Mirror". In her artist statement about this work she states:

The self-portrait is, by its very nature, linked to the artist’s identity. She insists on her relevance, her existence even, through her representation of the self. To create the first layer in the self-portraits titled "Through The Looking Glasses", I capture my face in a grid of 9 (three rows of three) or 12 (four rows of three) parts. The second, superimposed layer, also gridded, has anywhere from 9 to 841 parts. These images are screen shots from what has become my camera of choice, my iPhone. ... My gridded constructions are, in essence, anti-selfies. ... These self-portraits are consciously self-centered; they are considered, vibrant, multi-layered creations that state, “I am here, and this is my story”.

Hochbaum's previous body of work consisted of composite photo collages, in black and white and color. In these pieces, she begins with a grid of between 25 and 50 photos set up in columns and rows and works digitally to blend the individual panels to make a whole, a single picture plane. She always leaves a hint of fog at the border between the modules, never making a seamless image, to remind the viewer that this is no window one is looking through, this is the act of seeing itself, over time.

Previous to this portfolio, Hochbaum created shaped images, made up of individual panels printed into aluminum. She has used three distinct shapes - the symmetrical cross, the lintel or doorway and the Bi square, the empty square, or the squaring off of the Bi disc shape. She has also produced a series on the Silver Screen. In this series, Hochbaum takes screenshots of classic movies broadcast on TV, warping images of Hollywood starlets (Audrey Hepburn, Greta Garbo and Lillian Gish among them) before printing the image on aluminum panels. She has published a book with Daylight Books of the same name, SILVER SCREEN. Along with these series, she has created a number of slide shows to music; each contain hundreds of her images. Two of these pieces were commissioned by the University of North Carolina at Chapel Hill. One, Graffito, a collaboration with her husband the composer Allen Anderson, was screened in Memorial Hall in February 2011 as part of the North Carolina Digital Arts Festival. Another, return:radius, was screened at the FedEx Global Education Center as part of the Water of Life Festival in the Spring of 2013.

Her work is in the collections of the Museum of Fine Arts, Boston and the Benton Museum in Storrs, Connecticut, and in the corporate collections of Credit Suisse and Truist Bank.

== Collections ==
Hochbaum's work is held in the following public collections:

- Museum of Fine Arts, Boston
- William Benton Museum of Art at the University of Connecticut in Storrs, CT
- Credit Suisse
