= Franklin Street (Chapel Hill) =

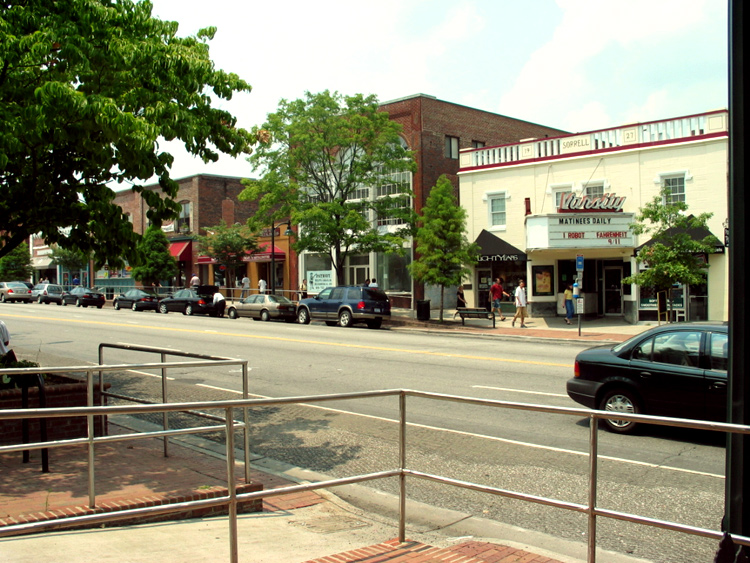
- Franklin Street streetscape
- Interactive map of Franklin Street
- 35°54′47.33″N 79°3′20.82″W
- Location: University of North Carolina, Chapel Hill, North Carolina

History
- Named: c. 1790

Franklin Street is the main street of downtown Chapel Hill, North Carolina, and the center of social life for both the town and the University of North Carolina at Chapel Hill. Coffee shops, restaurants, museums, bookshops, music stores and bars line the street, which is known for its nightlife, culture, and regular festivities. The stretch of college-oriented businesses continues west into neighboring Carrboro, where the street's name becomes Main Street. Both streets are home to small music venues, like the Cat's Cradle and the Carrboro Arts Center, which were influential in the birth of Chapel Hill rock. UNC's Morehead Planetarium and Science Center, as well as the Ackland Art Museum, are also located in this central area.

== Geography ==
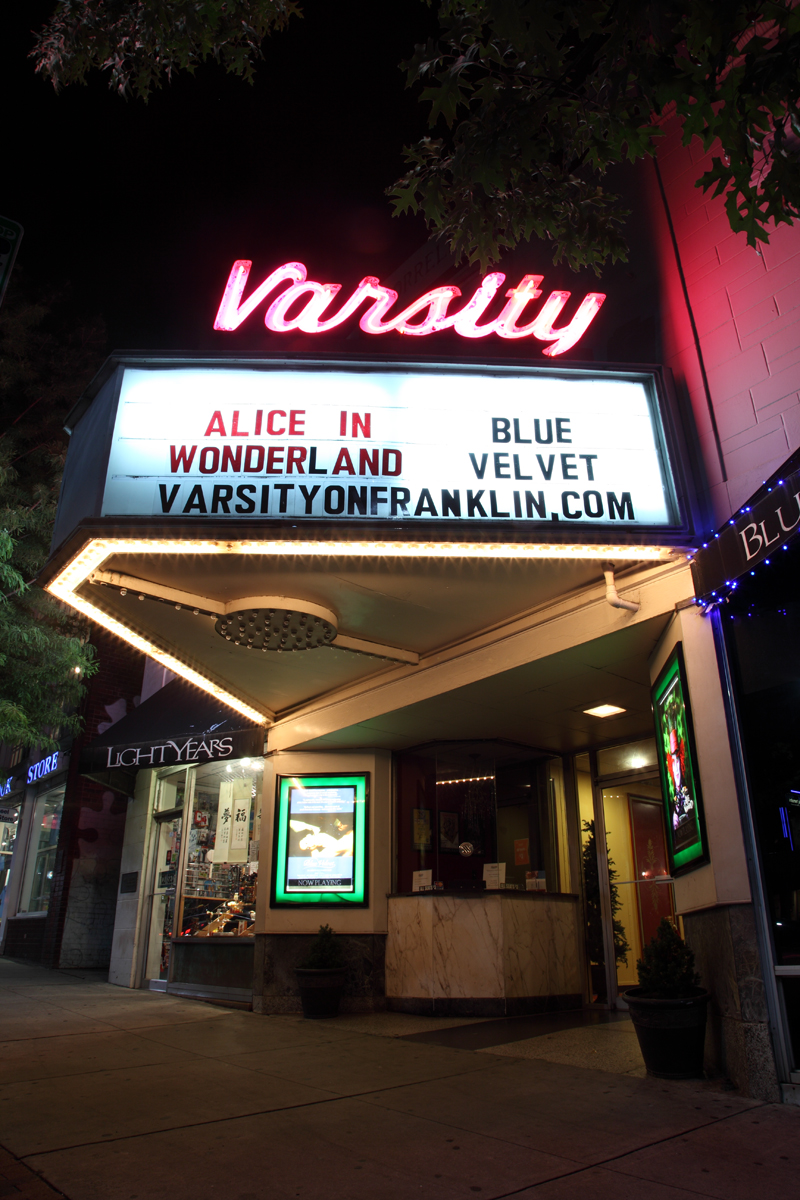
The Varsity Theatre is a prominent landmark on Franklin Street.

The three-mile (5 km) length is divided into West and East Franklin Streets. West Franklin begins at the intersection of South Merritt Mill Road where Carrboro's East Main Street ends. West Franklin moves east-northeast through the town's historic business district to Columbia Street, where it becomes East Franklin. East Franklin continues the straight path through the business district, passing campus and then curving north "down the hill" through some of Chapel Hill's historic neighborhoods. East Franklin Street ends just beyond Ephesus Church Road, where it intersects with U.S. Highway 15-501 before Durham. Over time, Chapel Hill and Carrboro have meshed together to form historically charming communities that offer a wide range of activities and cultural experiences to enjoy.

== Heritage ==
Named after Benjamin Franklin by the commissioners of the University (Franklin was a proponent of practical education for youth), the street has been in use under its current name since the 1790s, when construction of the University began. The stretch of Franklin from Columbia to Raleigh streets borders the campus, allowing views of wooded McCorkle Place (the North Quadrangle, named after Reverend Samuel E. McCorkle, who authored the original bill requesting a charter from the North Carolina General Assembly for the University in 1784). McCorkle Place is home to some of the school's oldest structures: Old East and Old West Dormitories, Person Hall (originally the University chapel), the South Building (main administration building), and the Old Well (site of the original well for the University).

Just east of campus along Franklin Street are several of Chapel Hill's historic homes, including the President's House, the Samuel Phillips House, Spencer House, Widow Puckett House, Hooper-Kyser House, the Presbyterian Manse, Kennette House, Archibald-Henderson House, and the town's first law office (known as "Mr. Sam's Law Office" - now a private residence). Many of the homes are featured on an annual holiday tour that benefits the Chapel Hill Preservation Society. After playwright Paul Green won the Pulitzer Prize in 1927, he used his newfound wealth to buy a house on East Franklin Street. Green's career is documented in the exhibition "The Paul Green Legacy" at the Chapel Hill Museum, at 523 E. Franklin Street.

The original Chapel Hill High School was located on Franklin Street until, due to desegregation efforts of the mid-1960s, it was demolished in favor of the construction of a new high school across town. The site of the high school became what is currently Carolina Square shopping center. White Chapel Hill High School merged with the black Lincoln High School to form the new Chapel Hill High School.

Franklin Street has long been a popular destination for entertainment and nightlife for Carolina students, Chapel Hill locals and visitors from Carrboro, Hillsborough, Durham and Raleigh.

"Flower ladies" sold their goods on Franklin Street for more than 50 years from the 1920s on.

=== Historical businesses ===
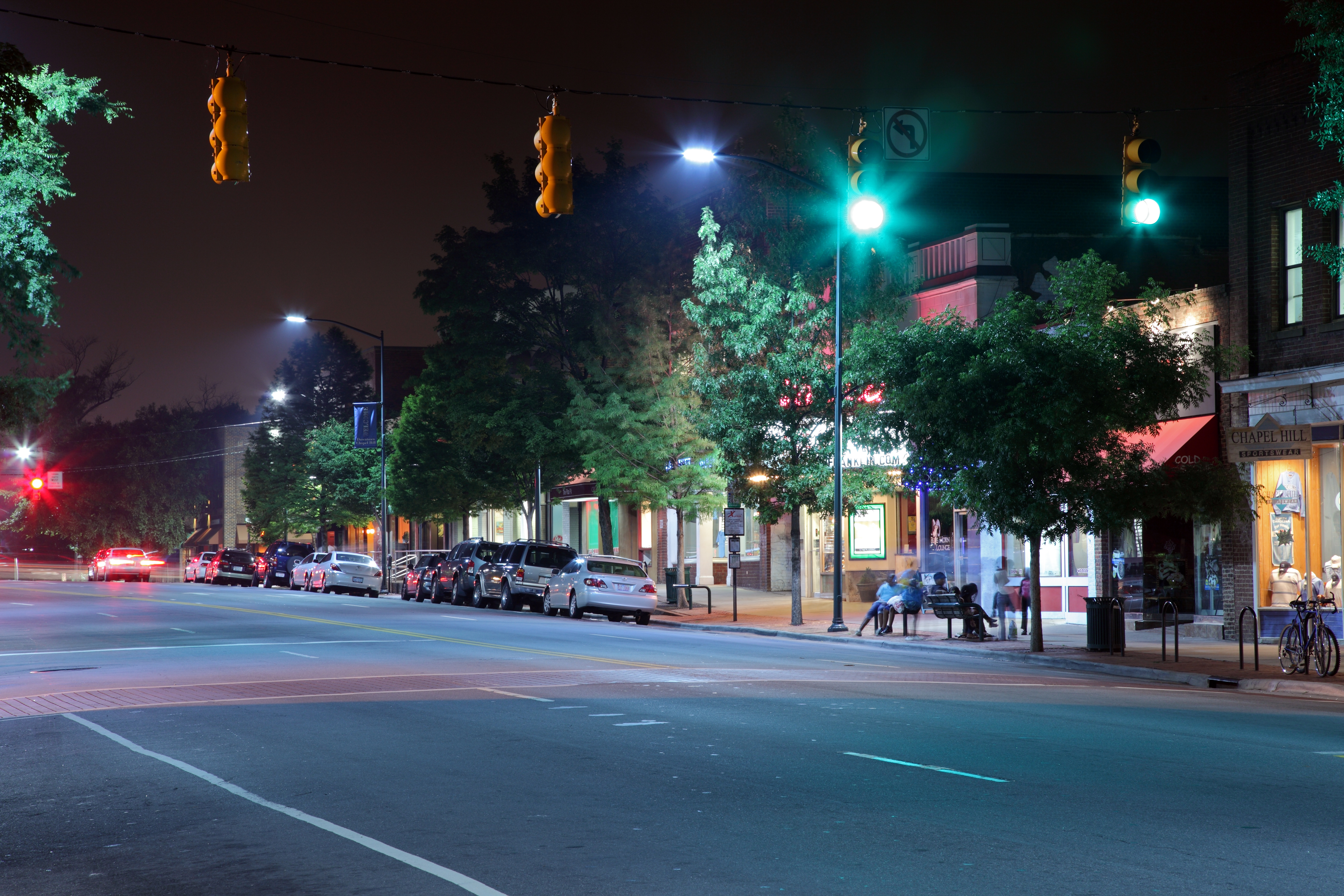
East Franklin Street crosswalk

Five businesses currently located on Franklin Street have been open for more than 50 years: Chapel Hill Tire Company, University Florist, Carolina Coffee Shop, Sutton's Drug Store, and Julian's clothing store.

- Colonial Drugstore: Originally located on West Franklin Street (closed 1996; now the site of the West End Wine Bar), Colonial Drugstore was the site of sit-ins in the spring of 1960 when students from Lincoln High School made a stand at the establishment's soda fountain. Shortly thereafter, Rev. Dr. Martin Luther King Jr. visited and spoke on the UNC campus, thrusting Chapel Hill into the national debate on civil rights. Colonial Drug was also the longtime home of the "Big O", a beverage made from fresh-squeezed oranges similar to orangeade.
- Ramshead Rathskeller: This establishment served famous UNC alumni its signature lasagna from 1948, when it was opened by a Jewish Austrian by the name of Ted Danziger, who came to Chapel Hill as a refugee from the Holocaust. "The Rat" was the first restaurant in the area to employ an entirely African-American staff. A popular spot with students and alumni, the restaurant, which extended over a catacomb-like basement with many different rooms, was filled with UNC memorabilia and history. "The Rat" was one of the oldest continuously operating businesses in Chapel Hill, but was sold and later closed down in 2008 due to non-payment of taxes by the new owners. Its decor and memorabilia were auctioned off, leaving just the bones of the structure. Customers included Michael Jordan, Jerry Stackhouse and Roy Williams.
- Sutton's Drugstore: Largely unchanged since it opened in 1923, Sutton's operates one of the last remaining traditional soda fountains in North Carolina. Photos on the walls feature patrons from over the last three decades. The manager, Don Pinney, has worked there for 30 years, during which time some of the same customers have traditionally come in for breakfast every morning.

== Celebrations ==
Franklin Street is home to several yearly festivals/gatherings, some of which are nationally famous:

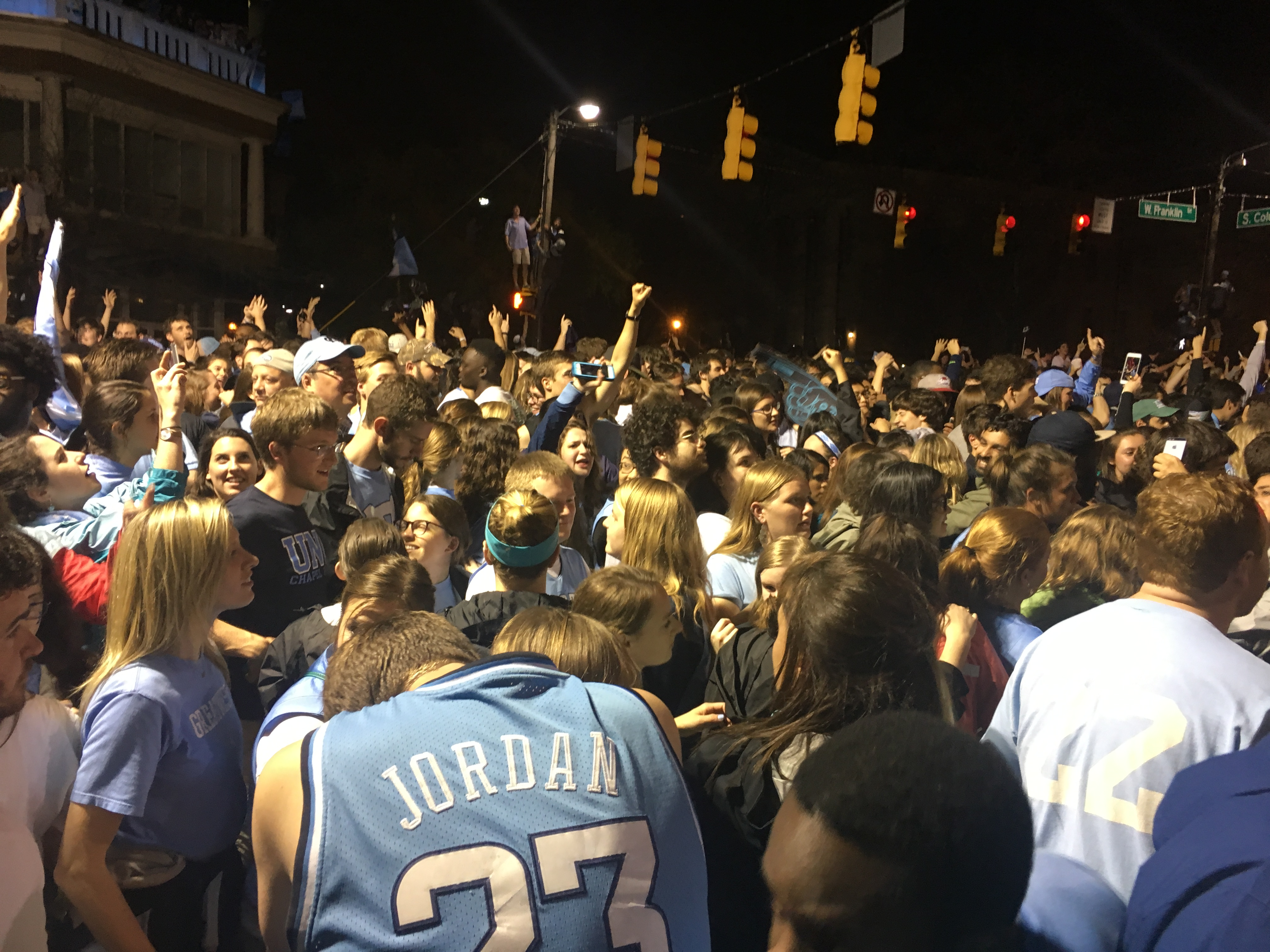
- Franklin Street victory celebration after the 2017 NCAA Division I Men's Basketball championship
  Victory celebrations: While students previously held "Beat Duke" parades on Franklin Street before sporting events, today students and sports fans have been known to spill out of bars and dormitories upon the victory of one of Carolina's sports teams. In most cases, “rushing” Franklin is due to a victory by the men's basketball team, usually over Duke with Blue Devils gear as the fuel, although other Franklin Street celebrations have stemmed from wins by the women's basketball team and women's soccer team. Upon the event the men's basketball team reaches the national championship game, local stores are known to halt sales of Carolina-blue paint to avoid a repeat of the 1982 jamboree which resulted in Franklin Street being painted blue by celebrating fans. On April 6, 2009 after winning the men's basketball national championship, over 45,000 UNC fans and students crowded Franklin Street. And on April 3, 2017, more than 55,000 fans rushed Franklin Street to celebrate another men's basketball national title.
- Halloween: Franklin Street is notable for its Halloween celebration, which occurs annually on October 31. Tens of thousands of all age groups attend the event each year; nearly 80,000 attended in 2004 through 2007. The event is not town-sponsored and the town actually discourages out-of-towners from attending; yet, an influx of non-residents descend on the town each year despite the town's suggestion. In an attempt to promote order during the event, the Town of Chapel Hill now closes the street to traffic after 8:00 p.m. on Halloween and directs visitors to satellite parking decks around the town, from where buses used to shuttle tourists to the main event area. Attendees of the event typically dress in costume and stroll Franklin Street enjoying the wide array of festive attire and snapping photos. Due to the cost and security concerns of the event, Chapel Hill has attempted to discourage the event in recent years. In 2008, Chapel Hill promoted a "Homegrown Halloween" which would only include locals and not out-of-towners; those from outside Chapel Hill were discouraged from attending. The town requested that Chapel Hill Transit not run shuttle buses from park-and-ride lots as it had done in past years, and Duke University students agreed not to send a bus as they had traditionally done. Bars charged cover fees and alcohol sales were restricted after 1 A.M. The strategy resulted in only about 35,000 revelers for the 2008 Halloween celebrations.
- Festifall: Franklin Street has become well known for its many arts and crafts festivals. Festifall is an annual festival that highlights local artists alongside musical performances and family-friendly activities. In 2017, the 45th annual Festifall, the festival included over 100 different vendors in 10 different forms of media. Isolated violence led to the canceling of the annual street fair Applechill in 2006.

== Issues ==
In the 1970s, hippies with street carts on Franklin Street were outselling businesses with storefronts, which led to business complaints and the Chapel Hill Town Council banning street vendors. The council first tried to block sidewalk sales of everything but flowers, but when the street vendors found ways around the rule, the council blocked all street vendors from Franklin Street. As of 2009, the town council is considering allowing street vendors again, although some business owners do not want street vending to be legalized due to the competition.

Franklin Street had problems in 2007 with an increased amount of loitering and panhandling, which was attributed to an increasing homeless population in Chapel Hill and the nearby location of a homeless shelter. The town has vowed to move the homeless shelter to another location, but has not yet done so. At least two property owners have said that they will move the locations of their businesses.

In 2021, the Town of Chapel Hill filed a petition seeking ownership of the portion of the road spanning from Henderson Street to Merritt Mill Road, in order to make expanded sidewalks permanent, which began as a way to keep restaurants open during the COVID-19 pandemic.

== See also ==
- University of North Carolina at Chapel Hill
- Chapel Hill, North Carolina
- U.S. Route 15-501 in North Carolina
- List of places named after people
