= Orange County Training School =

American high school (1916–1966)

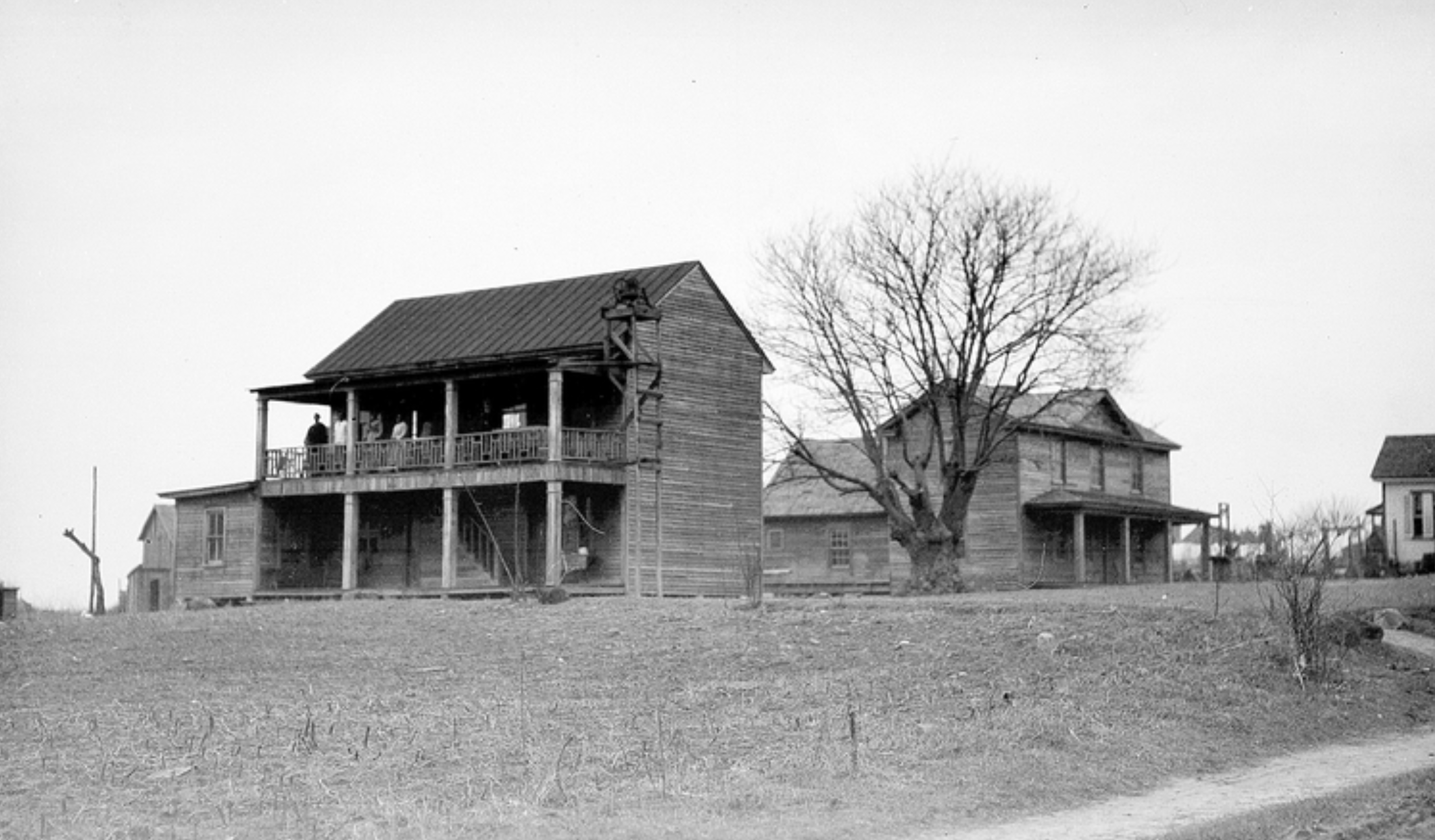
- Orange County Training School (left) c. 1916, first location 122 Merritt Mill Road, Chapel Hill

Location
- 750 South Merritt Mill Road, Chapel Hill, Orange County, North Carolina; United States
- Coordinates: 35.903525°N 79.068048°W

Information
- Other names: Lincoln High School
- School type: State school, elementary and high school
- Established: 1916
- Closed: 1966
- School district: Chapel Hill-Carrboro City Schools

Orange County Training School (OCTS) (1916–1948), later known as Lincoln High School (1948–1966), was a public elementary and high school that served African-American students in Chapel Hill, Orange County, North Carolina. It became a Rosenwald School starting in 1924, one of the 800 or more in the state.

== Pre-history ==
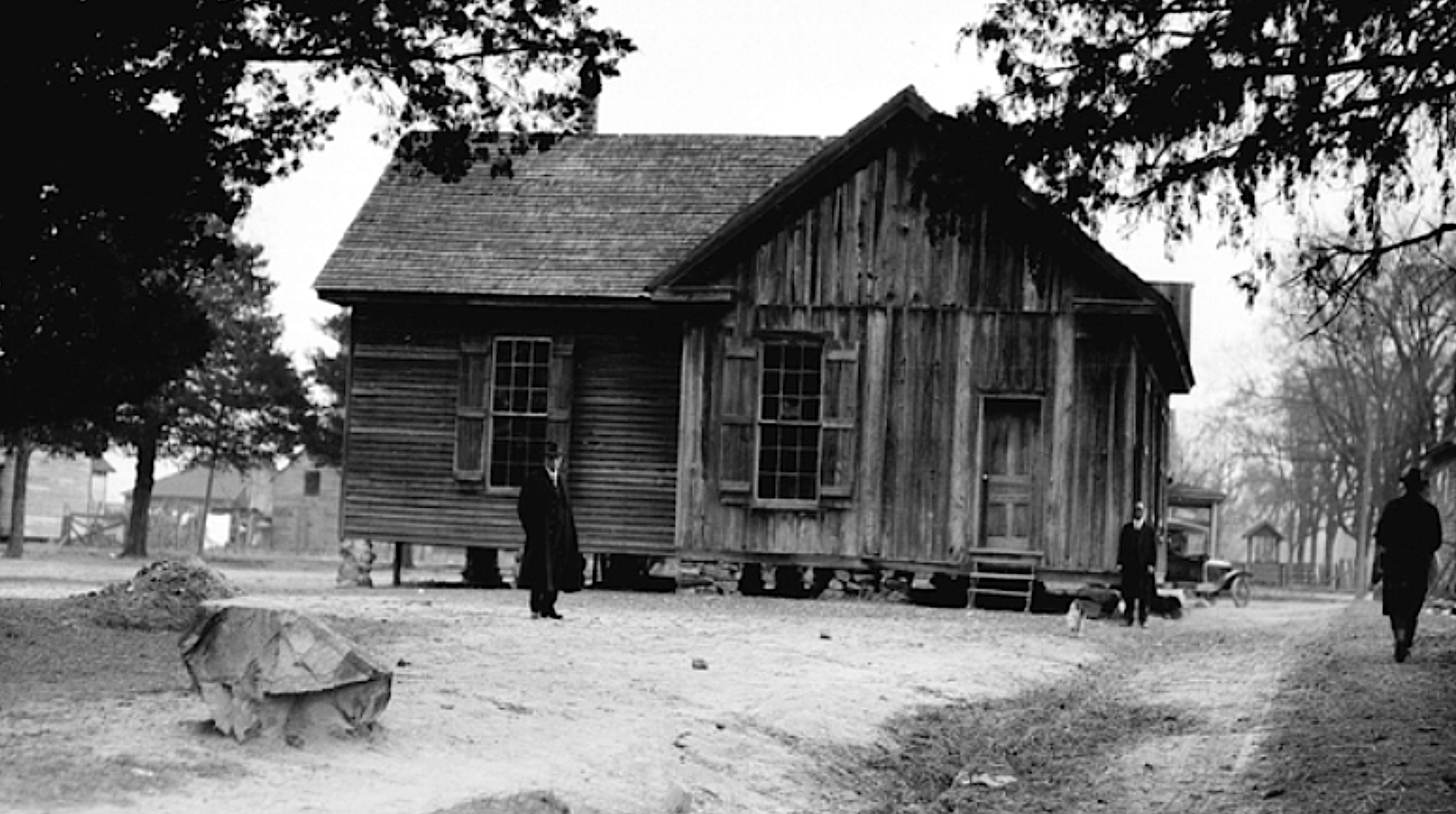
Quaker freedmen’s school (c. 1916) in Chapel Hill, North Carolina

A plot of land at the intersection of West Franklin Street and Merritt Mill Road in Chapel Hill was purchased by Benjamin Craig and Green Cordal and donated to the Quakers for the establishment of a Black school, and a portion of the land was used for the creation of St. Paul AME Church. The Quakers established a private freedmen’s school in 1868, and by 1890 they expanded the school for Black students in lower grades with some funding from the county.

Rev. Louis H. Hackney, a minister at White Rock Baptist Church (now First Baptist Church), established a private school for African-American children in lower grade levels (active from 1898 to 1912) located on Merritt Mill Road in Chapel Hill. After 1912, Hackney created Hack's High School (also known as Hackney's Educational and Industrial School) for African-American upper grade level children, located at 122 Merritt Mill Road.

== History ==
Because of inadequate funding, in 1916 the county purchased the Quaker freedmen's school and Hack's High School in order to create the Orange County Training School, located at the former Hackney School campus on Merritt Mill Road.

The Orange County Training School, a training school, was established to educate African Americans, mostly as teachers. People would often use the school's acronym, OCTS, because they did not want to be known as a Black school or associated with a "training school". In the spring of 1920, more than 300 students were enrolled at this school.

In 1922 the school building experienced a fire, and by 1924 the school moved to another part of town. The Carey Jones School was one of many private, small schools that opened briefly in order to continue education for the African-American students until the new school campus was ready. The land for the new campus was donated by Henry Stroud at present-day 350 Caldwell Street in the Northside neighborhood. The Rosenwald Fund helped pay for the new building. Another African-American high school existed in Chapel Hill in the 1930s, called Hillsboro High School for Negros (later known as Central High School). By 1946, the school needed to expand space and requested six to eight more classrooms because they had added the 12th grade for the first time.

It was renamed Lincoln High School in 1948, because parents were concerned about the name. In 1951, the building was renamed to Northside Elementary, after the school was moved to the new Lincoln High School campus built at 750 Merritt Mill Road. Principals of the school included Bruce Lee Bozeman (or Bosman) from 1919 until 1920; and Charles McDougle from 1946 until 1966.

The Lincoln football team, known as the Mighty Tigers, compiled an undefeated state championship season in 1961, with the team said to have gone unscored on all season. Many members of the football team were involved in civil rights activism, including several who were part of the Chapel Hill Nine.

The school closed in 1966, in the process of desegregation, and it merged with White Chapel Hill High School to form the newly integrated Chapel Hill High School.

The former campus at 750 South Merritt Mill Road is now the location of the Lincoln Center, the Lincoln School, and the school district offices. In 2017 there were plans to expand the Lincoln Center campus.

== See also ==
- Brown v. Board of Education (1954)
