= Pacific Fleet Band =

United States Navy military band attached to the United States Pacific Fleet

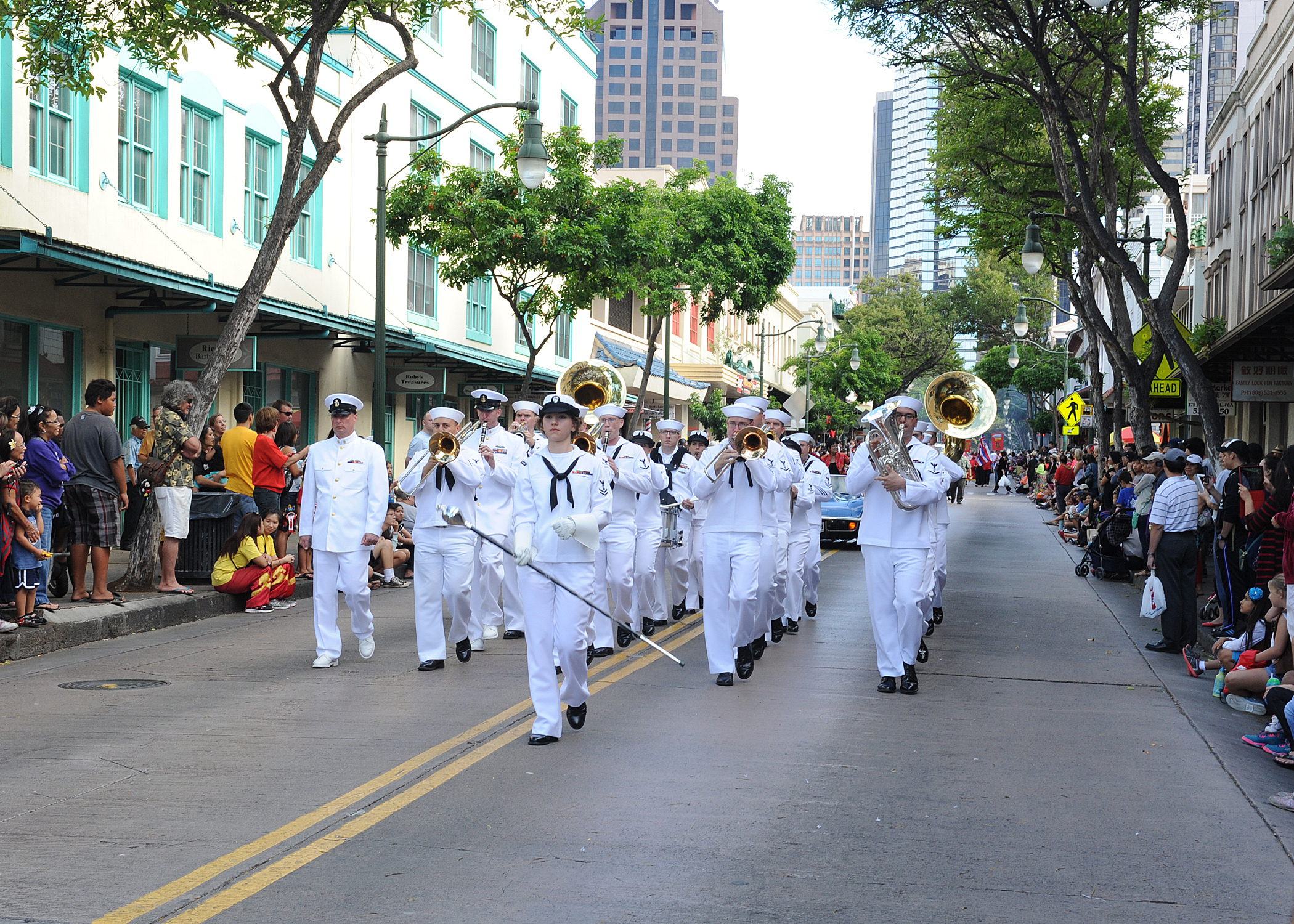
Members of the Pacific Fleet Band during the 2014 Night in Chinatown Street Festival.

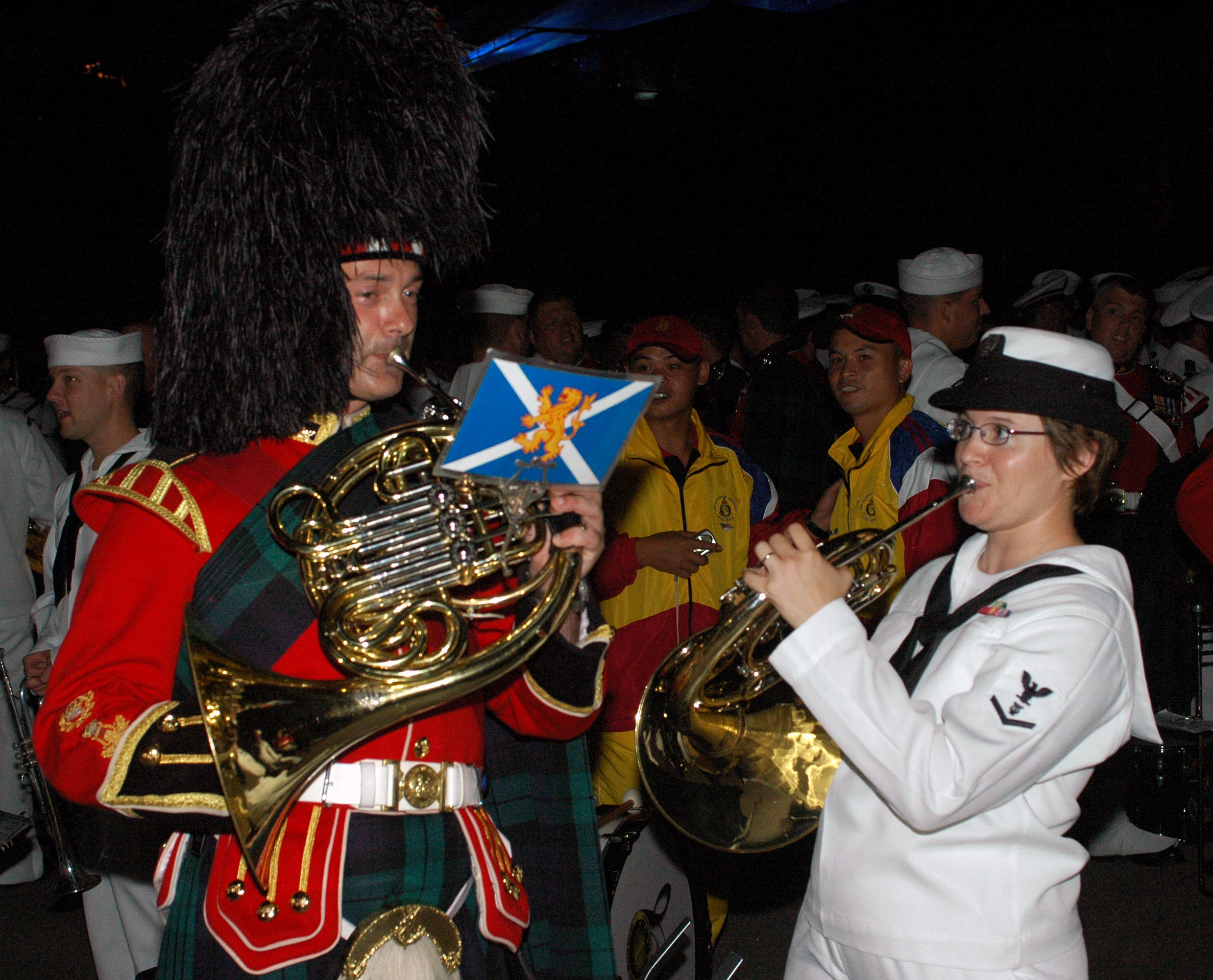
A band member with a member of the Band of the Royal Regiment of Scotland.

The Pacific Fleet Band is a United States Navy military Band that is attached to the United States Pacific Fleet based at Naval Station Pearl Harbor. It performs at civilian/military ceremonies, military parades, and unit/community events. It operates under the direct control and supervision of Fleet Band Activities, the official navy music program. It is also under the operational control of the Commander in Chief, U.S. Pacific Fleet.

Most band members have musical experience as either performers or instrumental instructors.

== History ==
=== History of naval bands in Hawaii ===
Since before the attack on Pearl Harbor, Navy Bands have been stationed in Hawaii either on ships home ported at Pearl Harbor, or attached to Navy shore installations at Pearl Harbor, Barbers Point and Waikiki. The most recognized and highly decorated Navy Band associated with Hawaii was Unit Band 22, stationed on board USS Arizona at the time of the Japanese attack on Pearl Harbor, December 7, 1941. On the night of December 6, 1941, there was a band competition called the "Battle of Music" at Bloch Arena on Pearl Harbor Naval Station. This competition began on 13 September 1941 as an elimination tournament held every two weeks and featured Navy Bands from capital ships home ported in Pearl Harbor. Four bands were to compete in each round of the tournament with one winner per round selected to perform in the final competition. On the morning of December 7, 1941, while the band from USS Nevada played Morning Colors, the Japanese surprise attack on Pearl Harbor occurred. The entire USS Arizona Band, while at their battle stations were killed in the attack. In the weeks to follow, all the bands that had participated in the "Battle of Music" voted to posthumously award the tournament trophy to Unit Band 22, renaming it the "Arizona Trophy." Today, the band performs every anniversary in honor of the loss of bandsmen in the attack.

=== Early years and Post-war era ===
The Pacific Fleet Band (Unit Band 56) was formed when the Pacific Fleet Headquarters was established at Pearl Harbor in February 1941, with members from all the bands present at the attack being included in the new band. From 1959 to 1964, the band operated from a building at Supply Base Pearl Harbor, just inside the Halawa Gate. In 1964, the band moved across the street just inside the CINCPACFLT Gate, sharing a building with Fleet Imaging. The band moved to the Pearl Harbor Naval Station Band building at Bishop Point near Hickam Harbor when the Unit Band 03 closed in 1966. Finally, in 1967 the band moved to its current facility, Building 277, located at the Pearl Harbor Naval Station Marine Barracks Compound, which was used as a Marine Barracks prior to and during World War II.

=== Performance history ===
Over the years, the band has performed engagements in Pusan and Seoul, South Korea, Guam, the Philippines and Okinawa. In 1960 and 1963, the band, combined with the Barbers Point Naval Air Station Band (which closed in 1965), traveled to the South Pacific for festivities surrounding the "Battle of the Coral Sea Commemoration Celebration." This trip was made once every three years, rotating with the Hickam Air Force Base Band and the Schofield Barracks Army Band. Ports of call for band performances on these trips included Melbourne, Perth and Sydney, Australia, as well as New Zealand, New Caledonia and American Samoa.

In 1968 the band was deployed to South Vietnam for close to a month, during which they performed at sites near military aircraft. During the visit, the band encountered many delays due to the ongoing Vietnam War, with in one instance, the band was marooned in Cam Ranh Bay for nearly a week while waiting for any available plane to take them to their next destination. During this tour, the band performed concerts in Da Nang, Ben Hoa, Cam Ranh Bay and Saigon.

From the mid-1970s through the early 1980s, the Pacific Fleet Band performed many concerts in Hawaii with such noted local performers as Jimmy Borges, Cheryl Barash, Melveen Leed and Ira Nepus. Another highlight during 1980 was a March concert at Kapiolani Park. This Concert was held in association with "Rim of the Pacific Exercises" and featured the International Sea Services Combined Wind Ensemble. This group was made up of various military musicians from the participating countries' naval forces. In 1986 the Pacific Fleet Band made an historic fifteen-day trip to China with the first visit by a U.S. Navy ship to China in thirty-seven years.

The Pacific Fleet Band made two significant overseas deployments. First, in 1988 the band traveled to India for the ceremonies commemorating the 150th Anniversary of the American Consul in Bombay. Then, in 1989 the band made a trip to Australia. Performances thrilled audiences in Melbourne, Cairns and Canberra culminating with an outstanding performance at the world-famous Sydney Opera House.

Although traveling abroad little since 1989, the Pacific Fleet Band has maintained an active schedule supporting the Pacific Fleet and the local civilian community in Hawaii. September 1995 saw the Pacific Fleet Band participating significantly in four major events of international interest. The first was the dedication of the Battle of Midway Monument on Midway Island. The highlight was the premier performance of the Battle of Midway Island march, written and conducted by Ambassador J. William Middendorf, II. It was written in recognition of the men who fought and died to change the course of the war in the Pacific. That ceremony was a precursor to the final ceremonies of the "End of World War II Commemoration" and the 50th Anniversary of VJ-Day Celebrations. Highlights of the band's extensive participation were a Presidential Wreath-laying Ceremony on USS Carl Vinson in Pearl Harbor, an International Parade of Ships and Aircraft off the coast of Honolulu, a Presidential Parade and Review through downtown Honolulu and Waikiki, and an old-fashioned Hangar Dance on board USS Carl Vinson honoring all our WWII veterans. The next event was the opening ceremonies for the Asia/Pacific Center for Security Studies. During all these events, the US/Russian naval exercise, Cooperation from the Sea 1995 was taking place. This marked the first visit of a Russian warship to Pearl Harbor and the Pacific Fleet Band was very much involved while hosting the visiting Military Band of the Pacific Fleet of Russia.

In 2001, the band performed for the opening of the movie Pearl Harbor on board USS John C. Stennis and the 40th birthday celebration of USS Kitty Hawk in Guam.

== Ensembles ==
The band has the following ensembles:

- Wind Ensemble
- Ceremonial/Parade Band
- Pipeline
- Tradewinds
- Harbor Brass
- Big Wave

=== Wind Ensemble ===
The Wind Ensemble is the premier musical unit of the band. The band performs at military and community outreach events and operates as a wind band.

=== Ceremonial/Parade Band ===
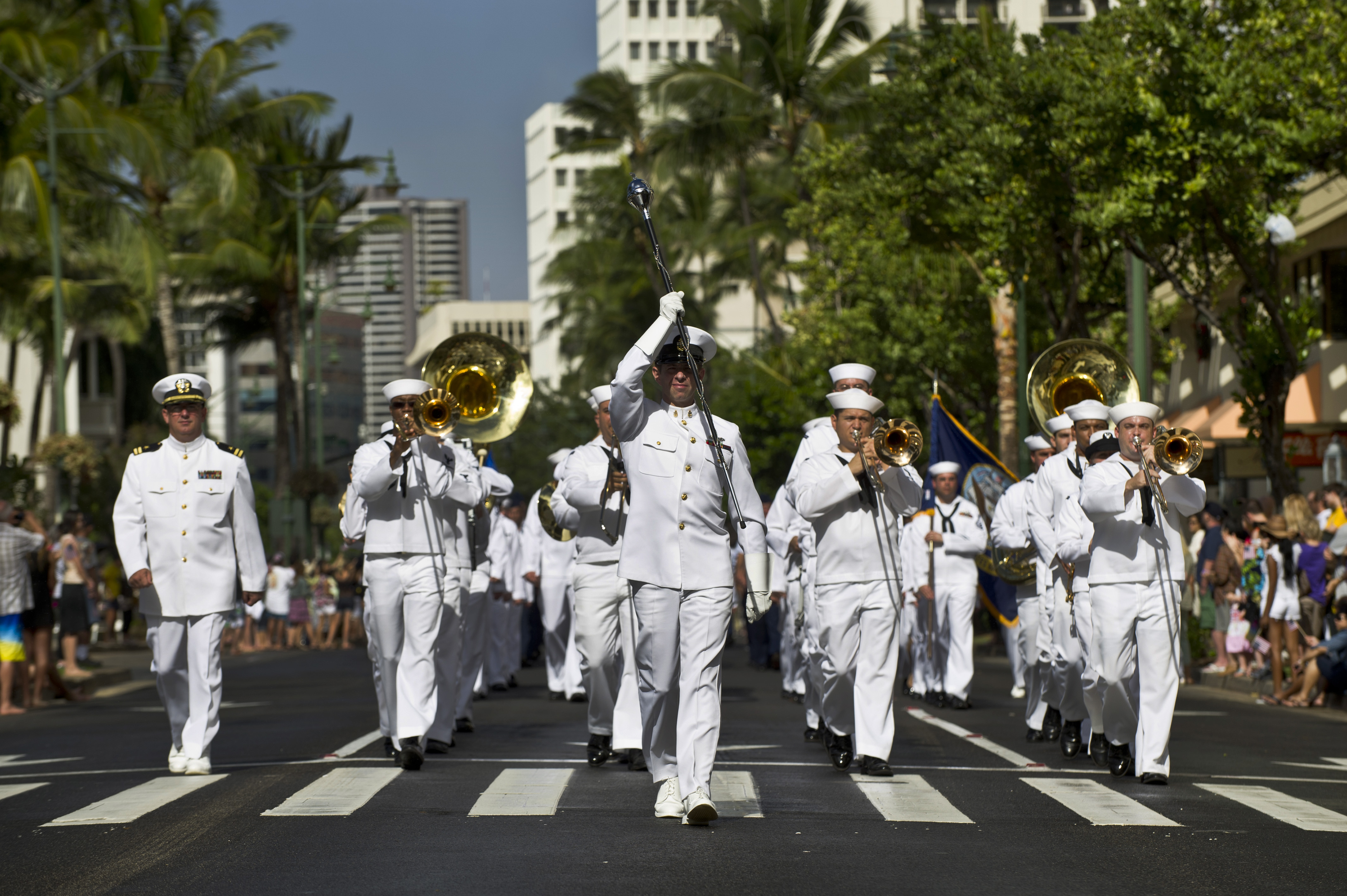
The ceremonial band on parade.

The Pacific Fleet Ceremonial Band is considered to be a traditional military band and is the most notable of the smaller units in the Pacific Fleet Band. They perform at more than 600 ceremonial engagements annually throughout Hawaii and the entire Indo-Pacific Area of Responsibility (AOR). Also referred to as the Parade Band, it also takes part in street parades in local cities. The 30-members that compose the band are required to perform conventional march music such as Anchors Aweigh, National Emblem March, and The Stars and Stripes Forever.

=== Pipeline ===
Pipeline was the band's contemporary music group that is composed of nine musicians. It has supported many military exercises, including Pacific Partnership.

=== Tradewinds ===
The Tradewinds ensemble is a woodwind quintet and consists of musicians on flute, oboe, clarinet, and bassoon. It participates in a variety of occasions from community concerts to military functions. It also participates on educational outreach at elementary and secondary school music programs.

=== Harbor Brass ===
The Harbor Brass has a diverse repertoire that consists of selections that include Dixieland, popular songs, and even Broadway show tunes. It operates as a brass quintet.

=== Big Wave ===
The Big Wave Protocol Combo is a multi-instrument ensemble that comprises bass, guitar, saxophone, and drums.

=== Pacific Fleet Chorale ===
In 1977, the Pacific Fleet Chorale was formed to complement concert performances by the Pacific Fleet Band. This ensemble was an all-volunteer chorus, made up of active duty members and dependents of all branches of the armed forces stationed on Oahu. The last concert appearance of this associate unit of the Pacific Fleet Band was in 1980.

== Mission ==
Much of the band's activity is in support of the ships of the fleet and the many shore based military commands. Musical support is also provided for other armed forces functions when needed. Military performances consist primarily of providing ceremonial music for Change of Command ceremonies, Morning Colors, Sunset Parades and Ship Arrivals. Other duties include providing reception music official dignitaries and entertainment for special functions such as Navy Birthday celebrations. Examples of the mission In practice include the band's role in opening USS Missouri and Vietnam Memorials and closing Naval Air Station Barber's Point in 1999. In recent years, along with numerous parades the Pacific Fleet Band continues to participate in many annual events including the 7 December Commemoration Ceremony, Memorial and Fourth of July celebrations, and a combined military band concert for Armed Forces Day. Dignitaries the band has been in the presence of have included the President, Secretaries of Defense and the Secretaries of the Navy, Congressional Representatives, senior unified and component military commanders, and a host of foreign civilian and military dignitaries.

== Directors ==
The band had the following directors:

- Chief Warrant Officer 3 George L. Briley (1956–1959)
- Chief Warrant Officer 3 John H. Norris (1959–1965)
- Chief Warrant Officer 4 Richard E. Larson (1966–1967)
- Chief Warrant Officer 4 John H. Norris (1968–1969)
- Chief Warrant Officer Philip H. Field (1970–1973)
- Chief Warrant Officer 3 John E. Ingram, Jr (1974–1976)
- Lieutenant William G. Brittain (1977–1978)
- Lieutenant Leo H. Leary III (1979–1981)
- Lieutenant Commander Harold R. Hessler (1982–1985)
- Lieutenant Commander Thomas E. Metcalf (1986–1988)
- Lieutenant J. Michael Alverson (1988–1990)
- Lieutenant John H. Farquhar (1990–1993)
- Lieutenant Gary R. Seitz (1994–1998)
- Lieutenant R. G. Barrett (1998–2001)
- Lieutenant Dale E. Yager (2001–2004)
- Lieutenant Kenneth C. Collins (2004–2007)
- Lieutenant Bruce A. McDonald (2007–2010)
- Lieutenant Commander David W. Hodge (2010–2011)
- Lieutenant Commander Robert J. Wrenn (2011–2014)
- Lieutenant Patrick K. Sweeten (2014–2016)
- Lieutenant Kelly Cartwright (2016–)

== Gallery ==
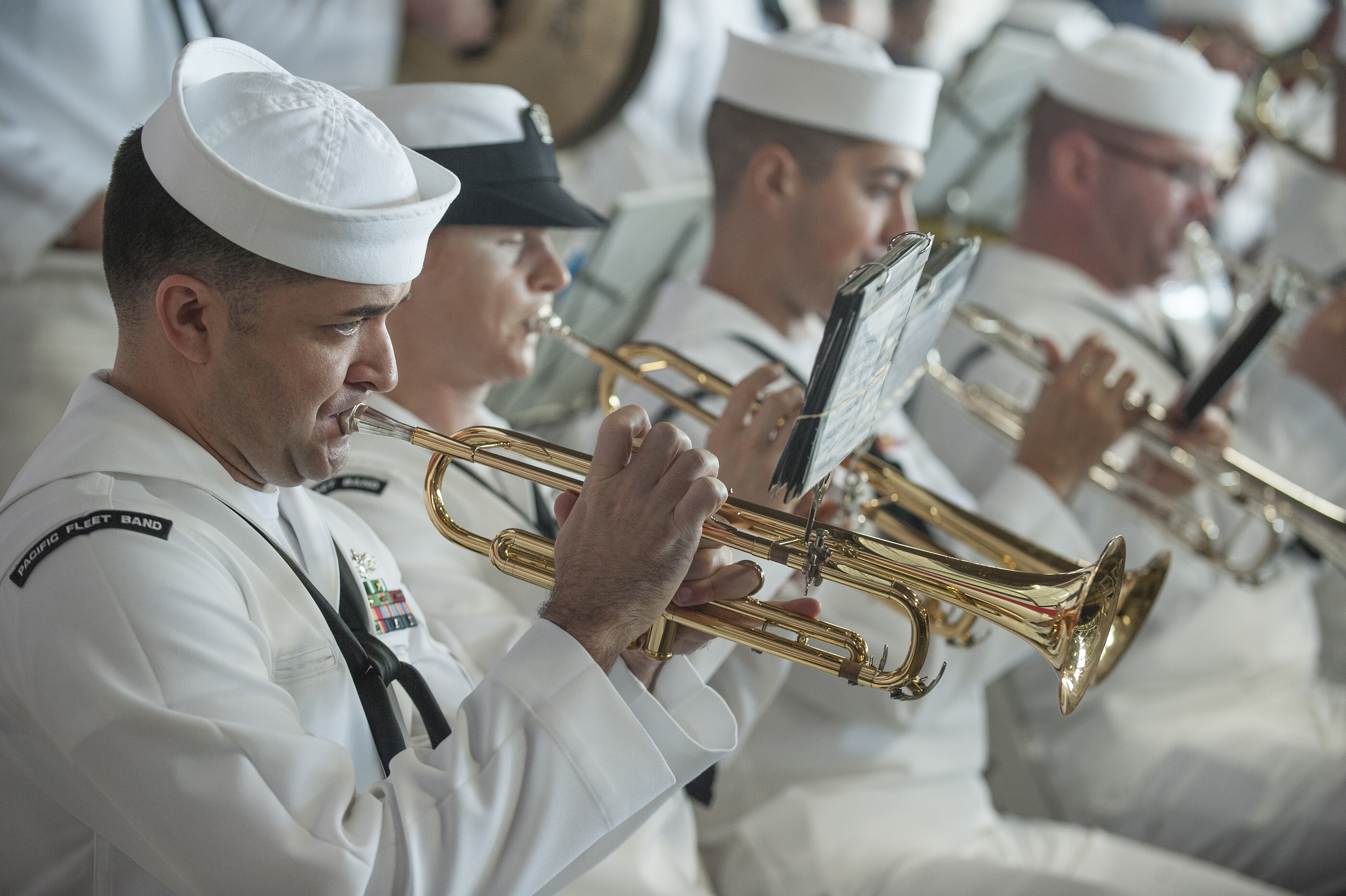
The band during the 74th Anniversary Pearl Harbor Day commemoration cermeony.

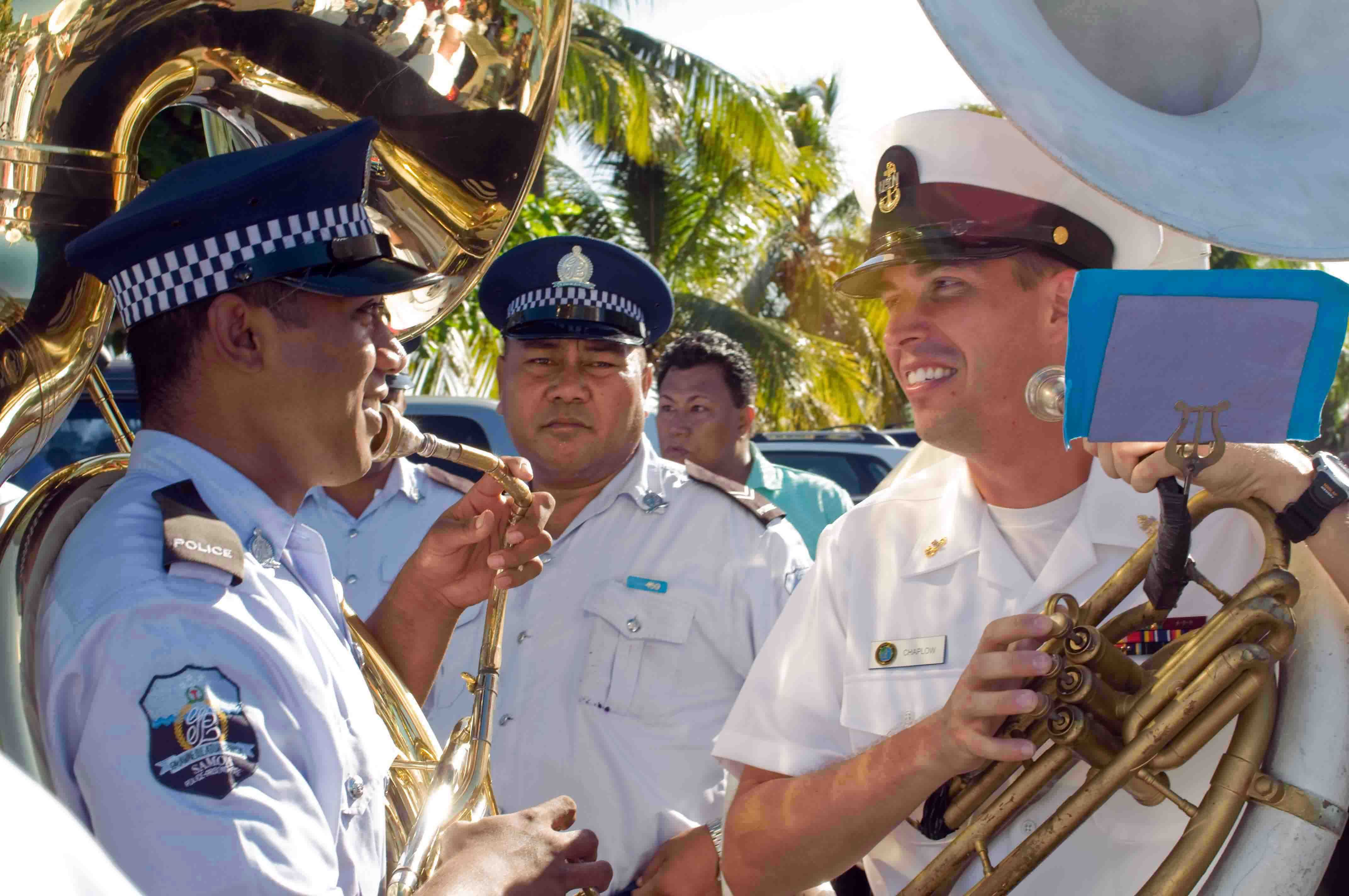
A member of the Royal Samoan Police Band with a member of the Pacific Fleet Band.

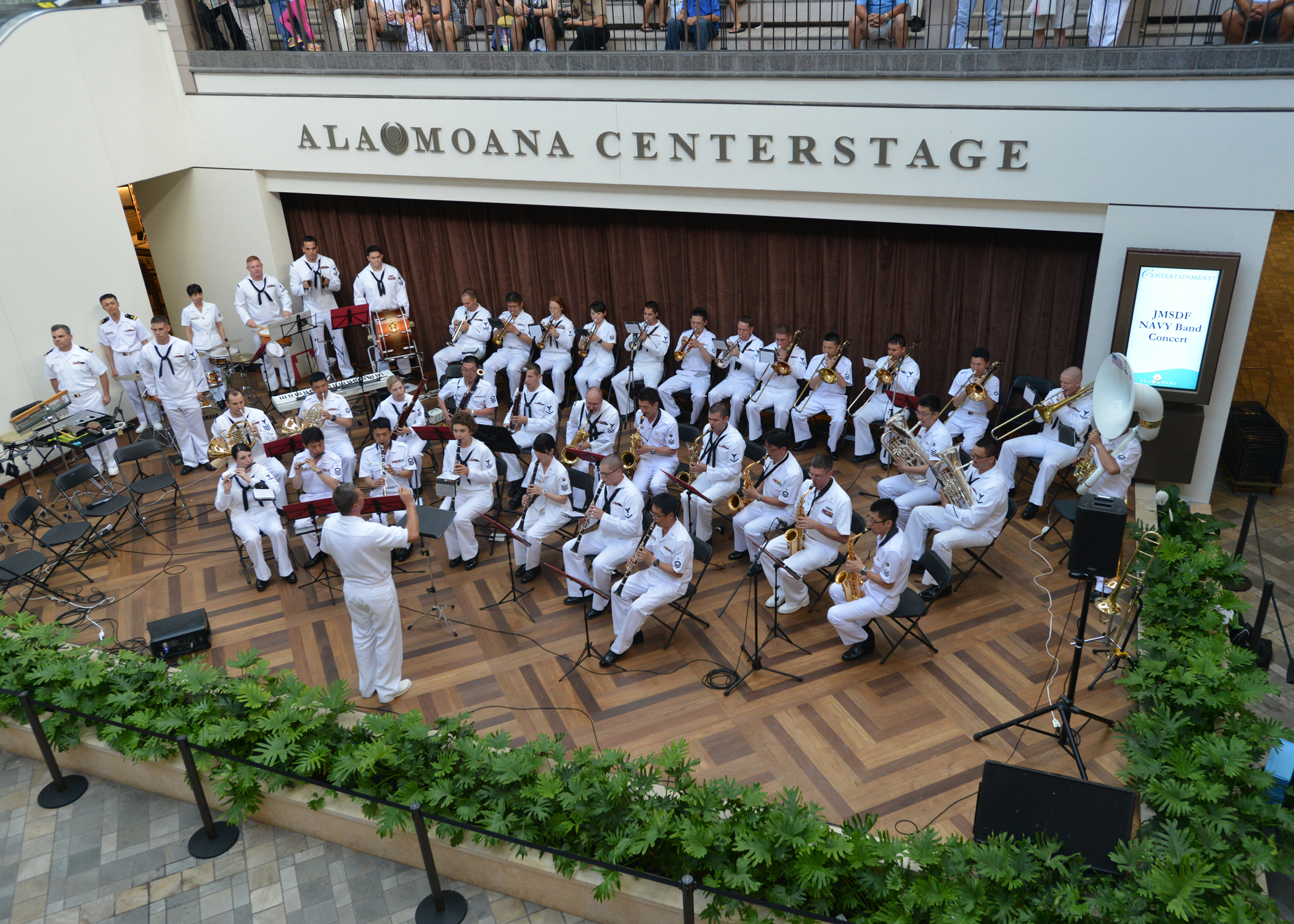
The band with a band from the Japanese Navy.

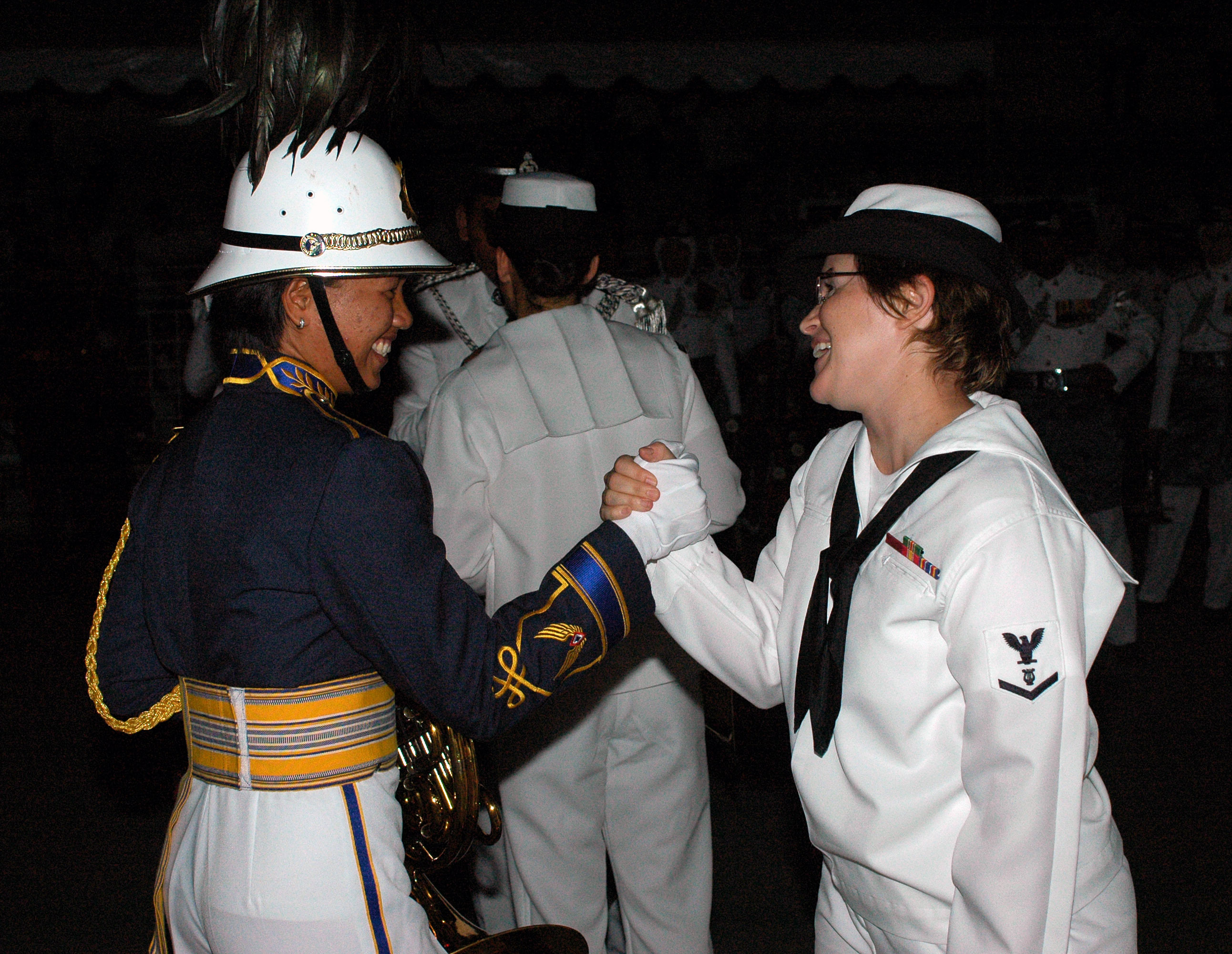
A musician of the Pacific Fleet Band with a musician of the Tonga Royal Corps of Musicians at the Kuala Lumpur International Tattoo.

== See also ==
- Fleet Band Activities
- U.S. Armed Forces School of Music
- Musician (US Navy)
- United States military bands
- U.S. Navy Steel Band
- United States Naval Academy Band
