= Fleet Band Activities =

Central management office for Navy fleet bands

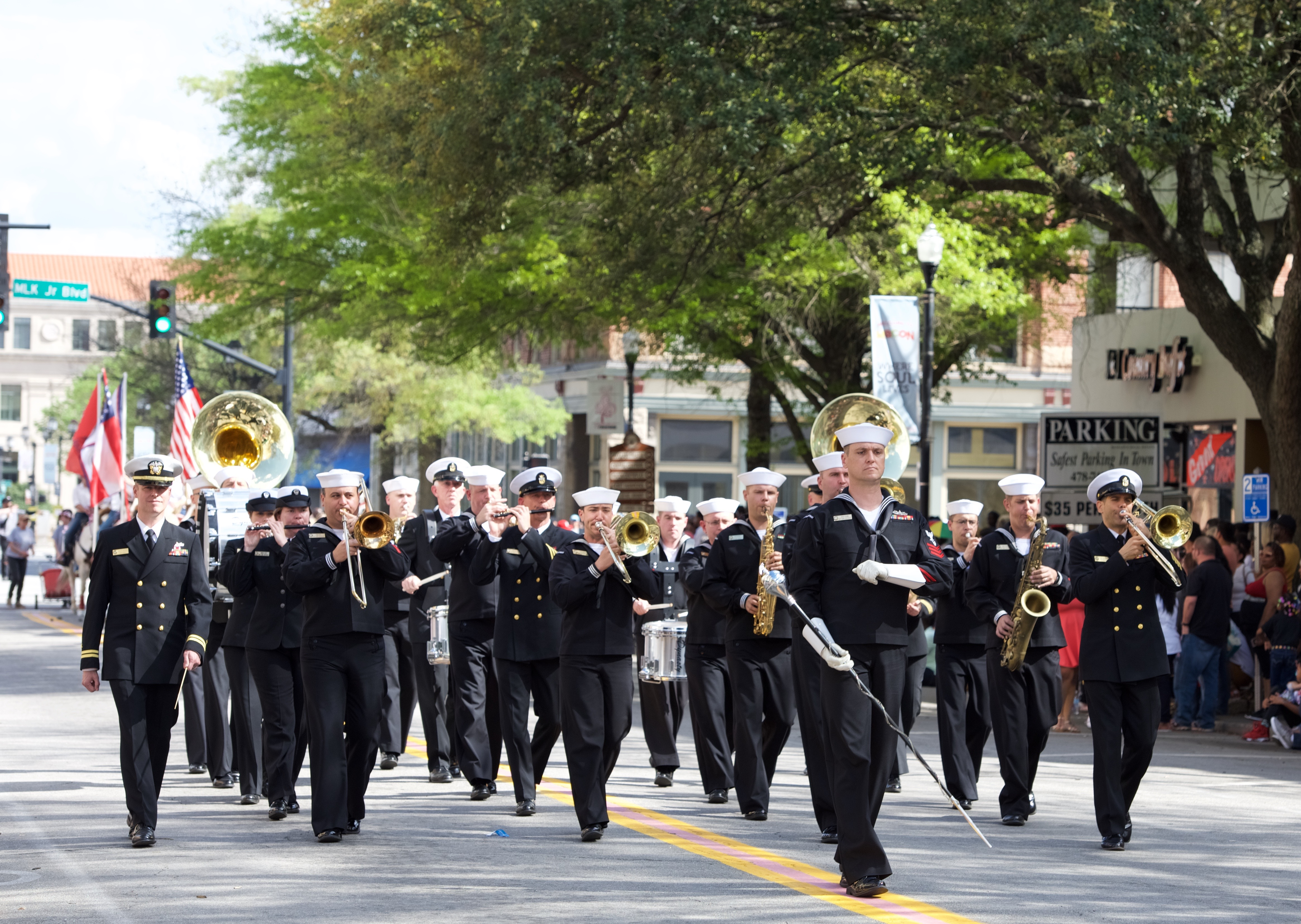
Navy Band Southeast's Parade Band marching during the annual Cherry Blossom Festival in Macon, Georgia, 2017.

Fleet Band Activities (FBA), formerly the Navy Music Program (NMP), is the central management office for nine active-duty fleet bands of the United States Navy. It is located at Naval Support Activity Mid-South in Millington, Tennessee. FBA has the responsibility of coordinating the assignment and distribution of personnel, equipment and funding to the worldwide activities of navy military bands. It also is responsible for managing the application and audition process for potential navy musicians. Personnel from the FBA work directly with the Bureau of Naval Personnel to meet our musician requirements for the fleet.

== History of navy bands ==
The earliest pieces of military music in the United States Navy was the Shantyman's Song, which often helped in boosting the morale of sailors and developing a culture based on shipboard life. Later came trumpeters, drummers and fifers who were carried on the early frigates to sound calls, give general orders, and perform at funerals and other ceremonies. They eventually gained a role as a separate section of the crew on many Navy vessels. Shore-based bands in the 19th century led to the creation of the Naval Academy Band, which grew in importance during the American Civil War. Other band units afloat and ashore played a major role in promoting the morale of sailors and civilians alike. At the start of World War I many civilian musicians left their famous orchestras and joined the Navy as well as other services of the United States Armed Forces, using their trade to contribute to the war effort. MUS1, a 45-piece regimental band led by notable James Benton Parsons, was composed of the first blacks to serve in the modern Navy at rank higher than messman. The first of a series of fleet music schools were established in 1903 in Virginia in an effort to improve the training and performance of navy bands. B-1 was replaced at Manana in October 1945 as its men mustered out and returned to the states by a 17-piece band that included future jazz great John Coltrane.

== Premier Bands ==
=== The United States Navy Band ===
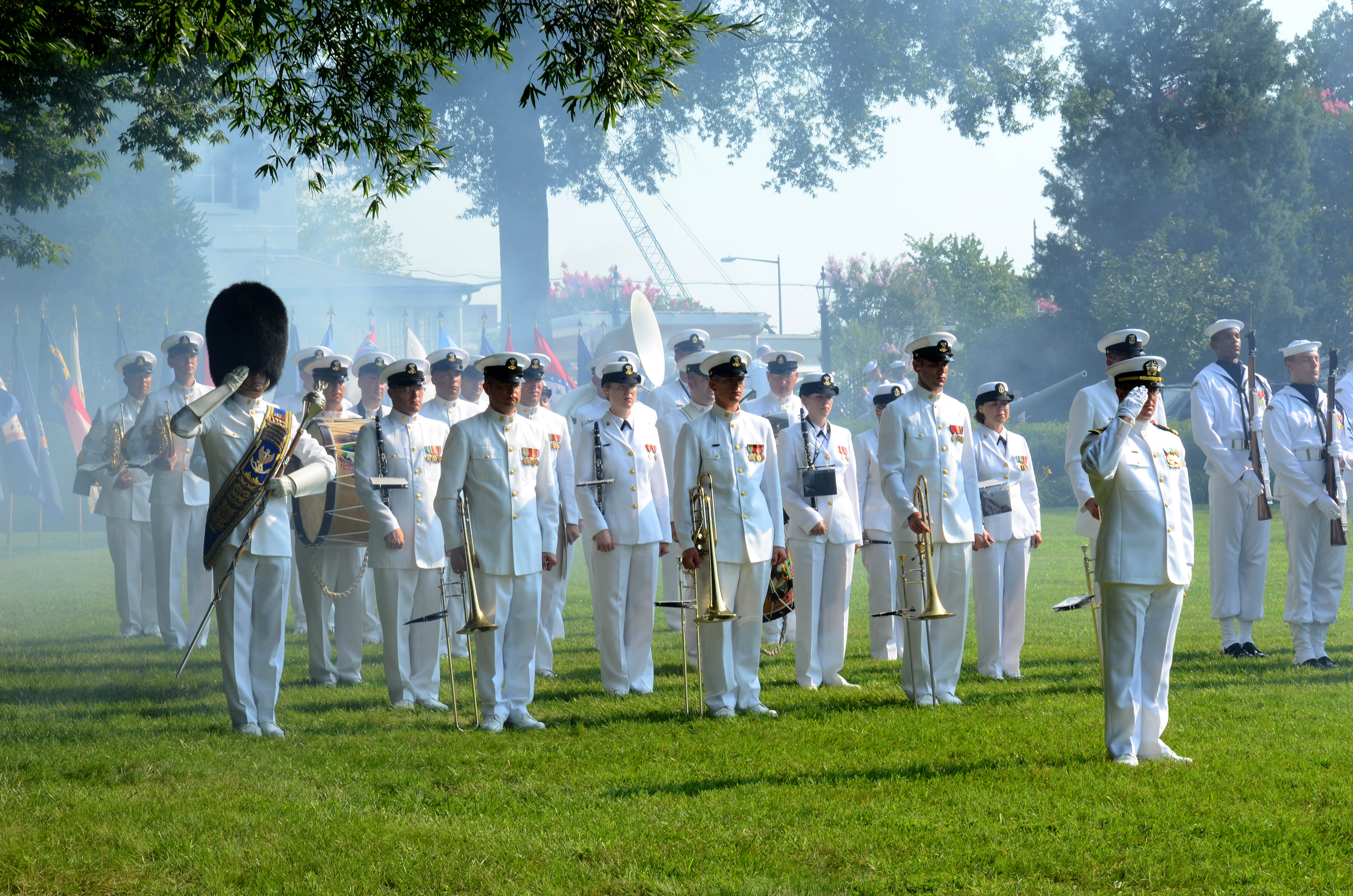
The Band during an honors ceremony at Washington Navy Yard.

The United States Navy Band the official musical organization of the United States Navy. Based at the historic Washington Navy Yard in Washington, D.C. since 1925, it serves the musical needs of the national government, performing at presidential inaugurations, state arrival ceremonies, state funerals, and state dinners, alongside other significant events. It is composed of the following ensembles: Concert Band, Ceremonial Band, Sea Chanters, Commodores, Country Current, and Cruisers. On 25 February 1960, 19 members of the Navy Band were flying from Buenos Aires to Rio de Janeiro to join the rest of the band for a reception by Brazilian President Juscelino Kubitschek on behalf of President Dwight D. Eisenhower, who was on a state visit to the country. As the Navy transport plane approached the city in dense fog, a mid-air collision occurred with a Brazilian airliner, with 19 members of the Navy band (including the assistant leader J. Harold Fultz and most of the string section) being killed. The crash was the single worst event in the band's history, and devastated the remaining members who, despite the loss and its reconfiguration, completed their South American tour. Events that Navy Band has performed in years past have included the funeral for President John F. Kennedy, re return of the hostages during the Iran Hostage Crisis, the dedication parade of the Korean War Veterans Memorial, the International Naval Review and the Quebec City International Festival of Military Bands.

=== Naval Academy Band ===
Navy Hymn: Eternal Father (instrumental).

Officially formed in November 1852, the United States Naval Academy Band provides musical support to the Brigade of Midshipmen and the surrounding community. Special events include the Side-By-Side concert featuring local High School musicians chosen to play with the band under the baton of a special guest conductor, and the annual Finale concert featuring all Naval Academy Band ensembles and closing with Tchaikovsky's "1812 Overture," complete with live cannon fire! Smaller ensembles are featured in the Chamber Music Series, a variety of recitals planned and presented by individual band members.

== Fleet Bands in the continental United States ==
=== Navy Band Northwest ===
Navy Band Northwest dates back to the Bremerton Navy Yard Band of 1918 and the 13th Naval District Band of 1925. In the fall of 1970, its name was changed to Navy Band Northwest and then to Navy Band Seattle and stayed that way for close to 30 years until it changed its name to Navy Band Northwest in April 1999 as a result of regionalization initiatives.

=== Navy Band Southwest ===
Navy Band Southwest is one of the Navy's oldest continuing musical organizations. The band serves as the musical ambassador for Navy Region Southwest. The 45-member band's other performing ensembles include the Wind Ensemble, the contemporary music ensemble, the Destroyers, the Show Band West, the Brass and Woodwind Quintets, and SeaBreeze. The latter is the band's VIP reception combo. It has performed for many different community concerts and professional sporting events, including regular performances with the San Diego Symphony Summer Pops.

=== United States Navy Band Great Lakes ===
Navy Band Great Lakes performs in a nine-state area of responsibility stretching from Indiana to North Dakota. As its name implies, it is located near the Great Lakes, specifically Naval Station Great Lakes where it serves under Naval Service Training Command. It also provides support to the local Recruit Training Command in supporting naval recruits during ceremonies in their basic training. From 1911 to 1917, navy uniform regulations prescribed that the band wear US Marine Corps Uniforms (without USMC) in performance. From 1917 onward the band wore the famous "Crackerjack" uniforms. Navy Band Great Lakes was instrumental in cultural change in the during World War II, having enlisted black musicians, and even creating integrated Navy Bands later on.

Notable members of the band include composer John Philip Sousa, trumpeter Clark Terry, saxophonist Von Freeman, trombonist Al Grey, composer and conductor Gerald Wilson, saxophonist Lou Donaldson, composer and arranger Luther Henderson, Major Holley.

=== Navy Band Northeast ===
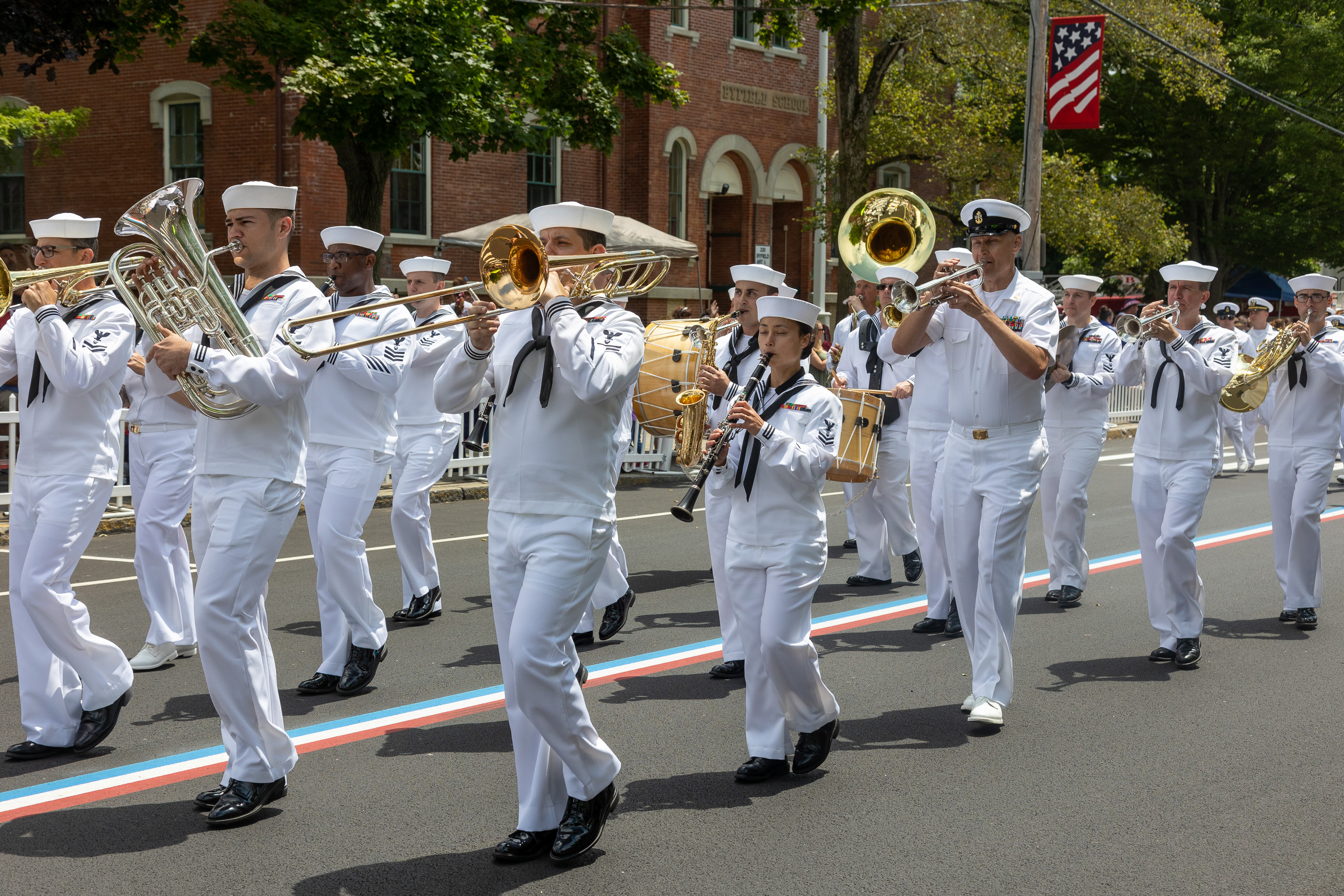
Navy Band Northeast at the 2021 Bristol Fourth of July Parade

Navy Band Northeast was officially established in 1974, located at Naval Station Newport in Newport Rhode Island. Navy Bands in Newport have previously dated back at least to the era of the American Civil War. It currently serves communities throughout the Northeastern United States.

=== Fleet Forces Band ===
The Norfolk, Virginia based Fleet Forces Band is the musical representative for the Commander, U.S. Fleet Forces Command, and is the largest of the 10 fleet bands.

=== Navy Band Southeast ===
Navy Band Southeast was established in October 1995. It represents the Navy Region Southeast and serves throughout Florida and the Southeastern United States. The band consists of 31-one professional musicians. It is notable in that it was the unit to which American Idol finalist Phil Stacey was assigned while on active duty (he was part of the "Pride" ensemble as well as with the wind and ceremonial bands). His success on the show benefited the band by drawing in an estimated 2.4 million dollars.

== Fleet Bands outside the continental U.S. ==
=== Pacific Fleet Band ===
The Pacific Fleet Band was formed coming out of the attack on Pearl Harbor. Prior to that, Navy Bands have been stationed in Hawaii either on ships home ported at Pearl Harbor, or attached to Navy shore installations at Pearl Harbor, Barbers Point and Waikiki. From 1959 to 1964, the Pacific Fleet Band operated from a building at Supply Base Pearl Harbor, just inside the Halawa Gate. It moved to its current facility in 1967. Since its establishment, it has traveled extensively in representing the Commander, U.S. Pacific Fleet, as well as the United States Pacific Fleet as a whole. It has performed at engagements in Pusan and Seoul, Guam, the Philippines and Okinawa. Its associations over the years have included American bands such as the Hickam Air Force Base Band and the Schofield Barracks Army Band as well as foreign navy band such as the Indian Navy Band, the Royal Australian Navy Band, and the Military Band of the Pacific Fleet of Russia.

=== United States Naval Forces Europe and Africa Band ===
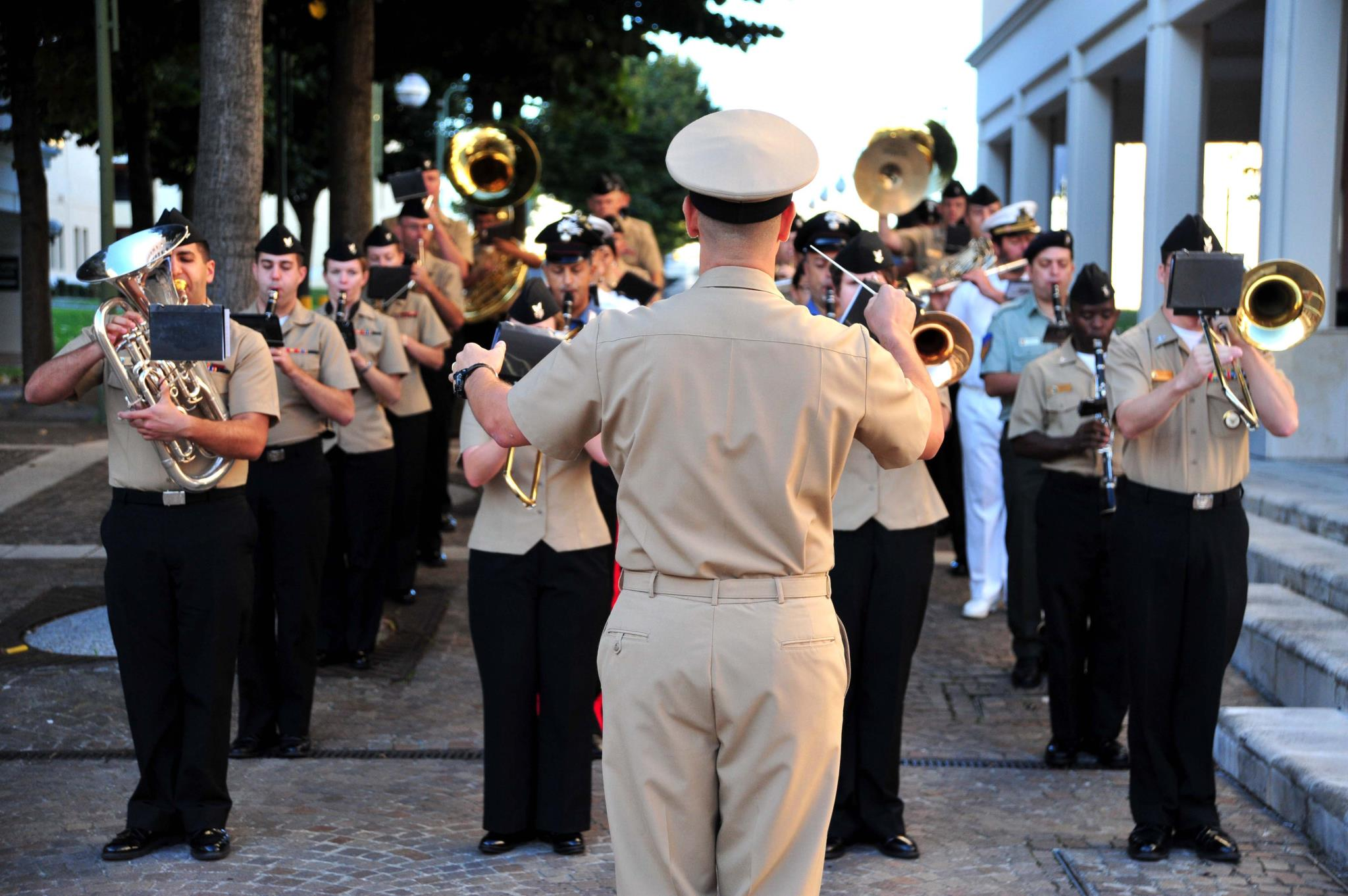
Members of the U.S. Naval Forces Europe Band during a ceremony at Naval Support Activity Naples, Italy, marking National POW/MIA Recognition Day

The United States Naval Forces Europe and Africa Band is the U.S. Navy's official band supporting Europe and Africa. Stationed in Naples, Italy, it under the operational control of Commander, Naval Forces Europe and Africa. The band performs throughout the European Region and throughout Africa and Western Asia. With that, it performs in locations such as the United Kingdom, Iceland, Croatia, Israel, Djibouti, Equatorial Guinea, and South Africa. Ensembles in the band include the Wind Ensemble, Ceremonial Band, Marching Band, Brass Quintet, Woodwind Quintet, a Brass/Show Band, Jazz Ensemble, Pop Music Ensembles, and Protocol Combo.

=== Seventh Fleet Band ===
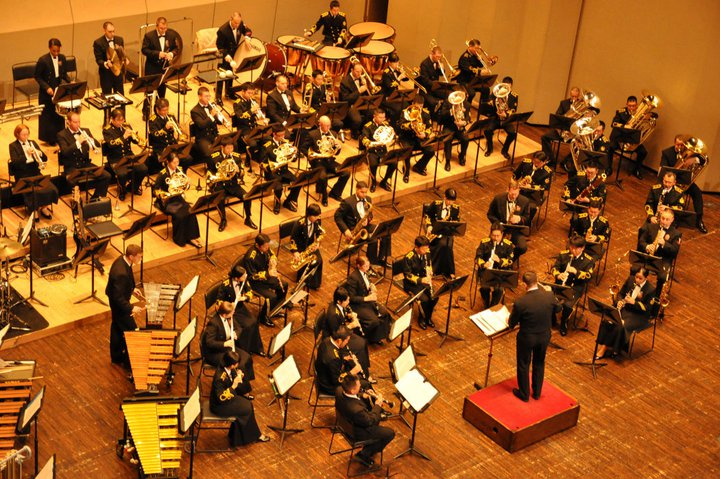
Members of the U.S. Navy Seventh Fleet Band perform alongside the Japan Maritime Self Defense Force Band

The Seventh Fleet Band was created as part of the United States Seventh Fleet, which was established upon the renaming of the Southwest Pacific Force on 7 March 1943. They base their activities out of Yokosuka, Japan, The United States Seventh Fleet Band is today composed of six groups of professional musicians: the Pacific Ambassadors Showband, the Far East Edition, the Orient Express, the Broadside Brass Band, the Shonan Brass Quintet, the Woodwind Trio, and a variety of other groups. It has performed in the Philippines, the Republic of Korea, Australia, Thailand, Hong Kong, Malaysia, Singapore, Indonesia, as well as many other cities and countries of the Far East.

== Support Unit ==
The Repair Division was established to provide the material support in the operation of Fleet bands both afloat and ashore. It comprises professional Navy musicians and civilians who operate out of Millington, Tennessee. It is responsible for many administrative tasks, not in the least of which is the shipping and receiving of equipment to/from bands fleet-wide. It is also responsible for maintaining inventory in excess of 50,000 items.

== School of Music ==
Located aboard the Naval Amphibious Base in Norfolk, Virginia, the Naval School of Music provides specialized training for selected personnel of the Army, Navy, and Marine Corps. It is also the first institution musicians attend following basic training. Graduates of the Navy School of Music go on to serve throughout the Army, Navy, and Marine Corps as members of the military bands of these three branches.

In June 1935, the Navy School of Music was opened, operating in conjunction with the United States Navy Band until becoming an independent entity in 1942. Students enrolled at the School during this era graduated as complete ensembles—transferring as a unit to serve aboard ships in the U.S. Fleet. Unit Band No. 22, for example, was deployed to USS Arizona—ultimately to be counted among the first casualties during the Japanese attack on Pearl Harbor. After more than a decade of operating as a Navy-specific institution, the School received group of 15 enlisted Marines and, following negotiations between Secretary of the Army Frank Pace and the Chief of Naval Personnel Admiral John W. Roper, Army students began being enrolled in January 1951. On 13 December 1951, the first women to graduate from the Naval School of Music received their diplomas.

== See also ==
- United States military bands
- U.S. Navy Steel Band
- Anchors Aweigh
- Navy bands in Canada
- Navy Office of Community Outreach
- Marine Corps Musician Enlistment Option Program

== Sources ==
- Navy Band Northwest
- Navy Band Southwest
- Navy Band Great Lakes
- Navy Band Northeast
- Navy Band Southeast
- The United States Fleet Forces Band
- Pacific Fleet Band
- US Naval Forces Europe Band
- US Seventh Fleet Band
- The United States Navy Band
- US Naval Academy Band
- Navy School of Music
