= Navy Office of Community Outreach =

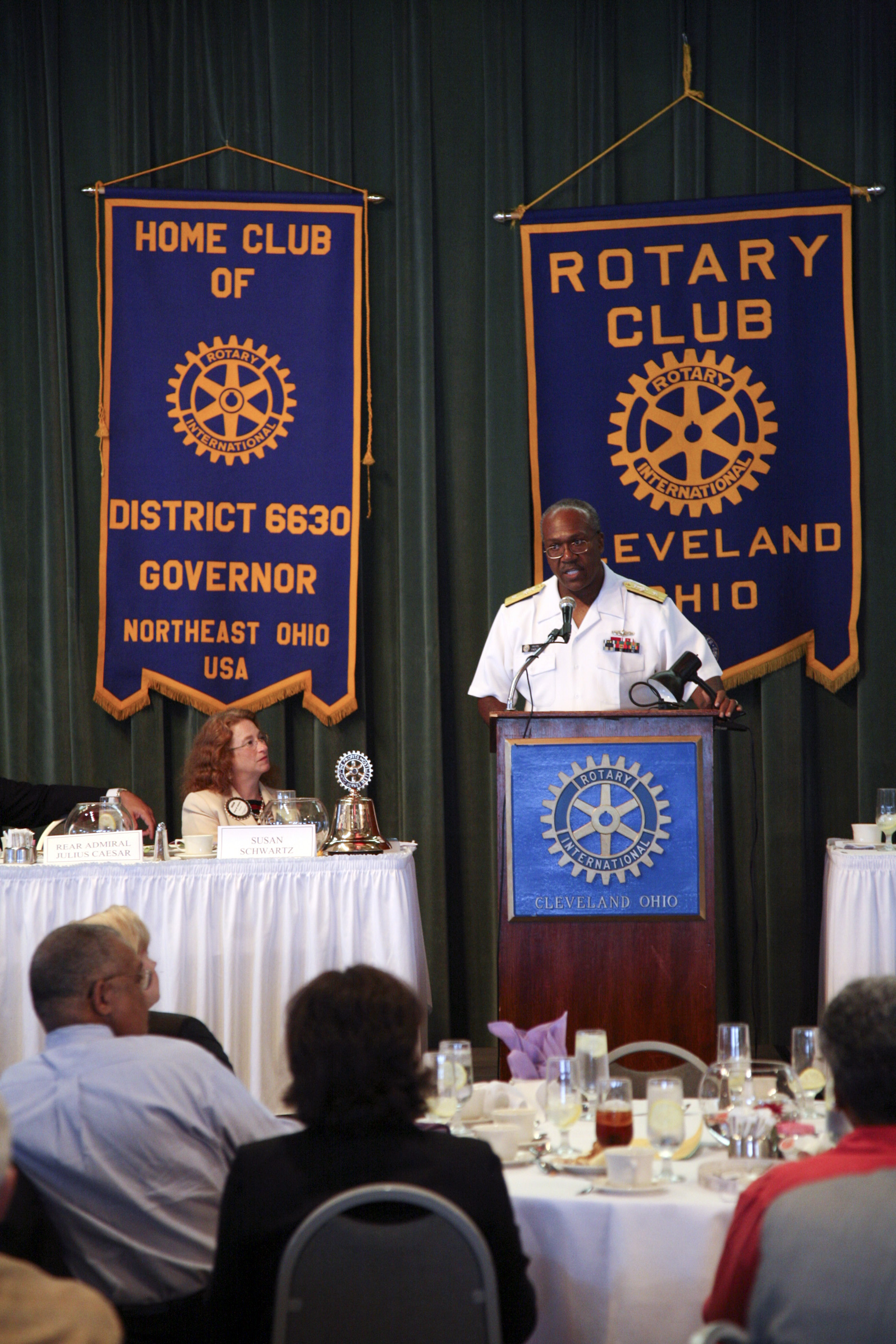
Rear Admiral Julius Caesar speaks to business and community leaders of the Cleveland Rotary Club during Cleveland Navy Week

The Navy Office of Community Outreach (NAVCO) serves as the U.S. Navy's primary community outreach field activity under the Chief of Information (CHINFO).

NAVCO's main focus is to engage with communities across Middle America through Navy Weeks, where a significant presence of Navy personnel and assets is brought to various cities and towns. To facilitate outreach during Navy Weeks, NAVCO implements several key programs such as the Navy Speakers' Bureau, Navy Band support, Navy Aviation support, Caps for Kids initiative, media outreach, and coordination with Ships and Submarines for namesake visits.

== Mission ==
NAVCO serves as the central point of coordination for Navy community outreach programs throughout the continental U.S., with the exception of fleet concentration areas and the Los Angeles and New York metropolitan areas. The goal of this coordination is to conduct and align national Navy image, awareness and branding efforts by coordinating existing personnel and assets to maximize community-relations impact.

Key aspects of NAVCO:

- Assisting Navy operations worldwide with heartland media placement during contingencies, emergencies, and deployments.
- Building and maintaining relationships with media organizations in key American markets.
- Building lasting relationships with citizens in business, education, and government.
- Coordinating and assisting national community outreach programs.
- Coordinating and tracking the Navy's Caps for Kids program.
- Coordinating leaders to sea embarks for business and civic leaders, educators and community influencers.
- Coordinating national naval aviation and tactical flight demonstration requests for community events.
- Maintaining and coordinating a proactive national Speakers' Bureau.
- Reaching untouched public in the American heartland.
- Tracking events scheduled and conducted by Flag and commanding officers.

== Navy Aviation Event Support ==
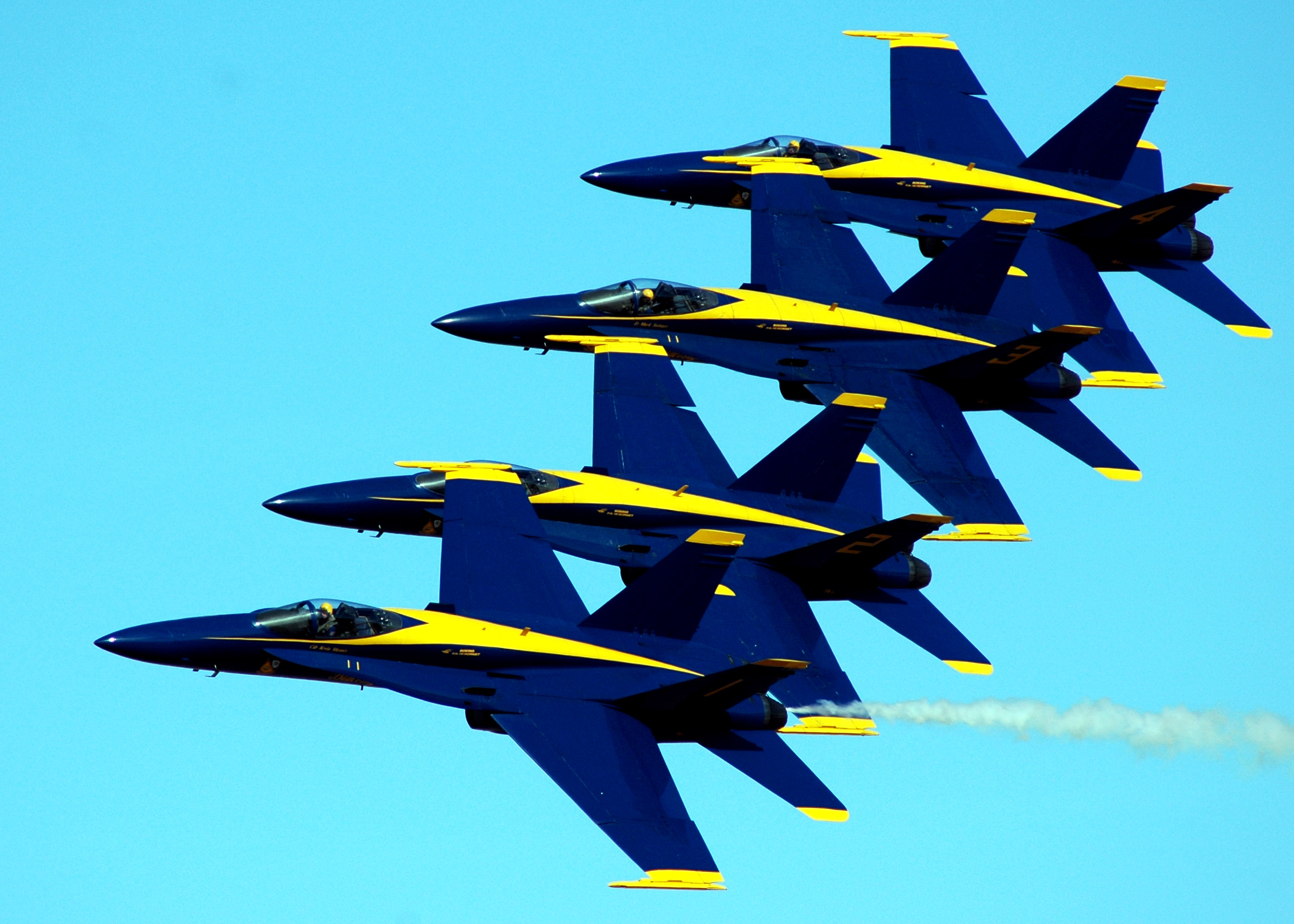
U.S. Navy Blue Angels

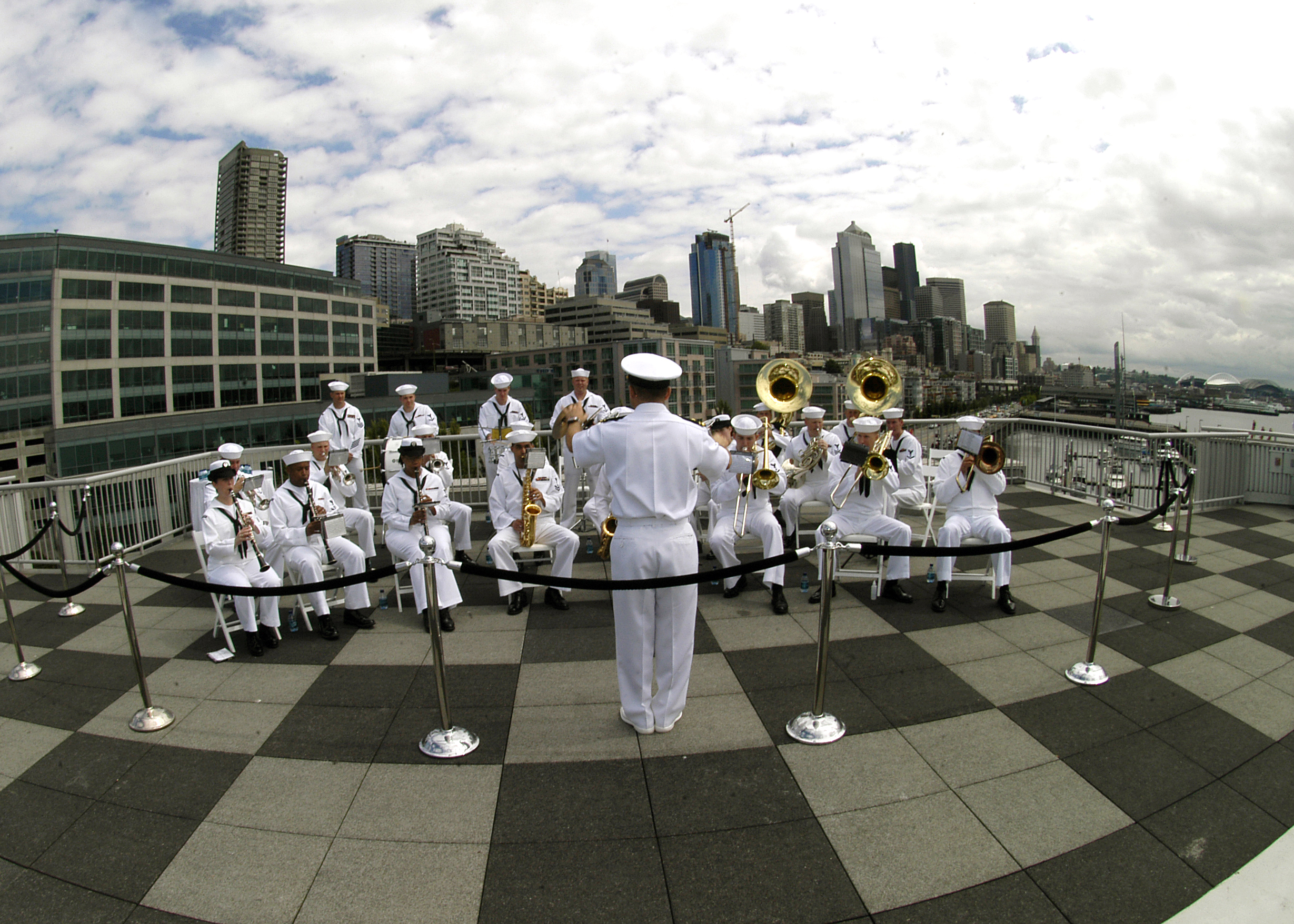
The Navy Region Northwest Band performs during the last week of the month-long Seattle Sea Fair parade of ships.

The objective of Navy Aviation Support is to help facilitate and coordinate the distribution of active-duty U.S. naval aircraft and aviation resources to support public demonstration events across the United States. Aviation support includes performances by the Blue Angels, the Leap Frogs, East and West Coast Tactical Demonstration Teams, aircraft static displays and flyovers. The Navy Office of Community Outreach determines the eligibility of each event based upon applicable Department of Defense(DoD) and Department of the Navy regulations. A current listing of all eligible aviation events can be found on the Navy Office of Community Outreach website.

== Navy Band Event Support ==
The objective of the Navy Band Support is to coordinate Navy musical groups in support of Navy Weeks and related community outreach events throughout the United States. Band support is also coordinated for recruiting efforts through the Music for Recruiting Program. Navy bands across the United States are composed of top rated musicians who perform in various musical units including Ceremonial and Parade Bands, Pop/Rock Bands, Brass and Woodwind Quintets and Jazz Ensembles. Navy Bands may be authorized to perform concerts, patriotic ceremonies and parades for the general public and school concerts in support of Navy Recruiting.

== Navy Speakers' Bureau ==
The Navy Speakers' Bureau is designed to assist public organizations who are seeking Navy speakers for community relations and outreach events. Participating speakers are volunteers and include active and reserve component and retired Navy personnel as well as DON civilian personnel. The Navy Speakers Bureau also provides liaison for Navy flag officers who participate in Navy Weeks conducted in various cities across Mid-America each year. In addition, the Navy Speakers Bureau provides a wide variety of resource materials to assist speakers in composing remarks and developing presentations. Organizations seeking speaking support for seminars, conventions, symposiums, and recurring meetings should pursue other avenues to locate speakers. Visit the NAVCO Navy Speakers Bureau page for more information on how to request a Navy speaker.

== Navy Caps For Kids ==
=== Background ===
Early in the 1990s, the idea began circulating among a few charitable organizations to encourage celebrities and other notables to donate autographed hats and other clothing to hospitalized children. The Navy Office of Information Southwest, adapted the idea with a Navy flavor into an ever-growing outreach program. Today, more than 500 commands, including ships, submarines, naval air squadrons and Navy personnel have donated ball caps and other Navy memorabilia along with their time and energy to help bring a smile to the faces of young patients in hospitals all over the country.

=== Mission ===
NAVCO supports the Navy Caps for Kids program by helping operational commands connect with children in hospitals throughout the nation. NAVCO collects ball caps donated from Navy commands everywhere and ensures they get personally delivered to young patients in hospitals in non-Navy regions. NAVCO also helps commands establish Caps for Kids programs with the hospitals in their local area.

Participating in any given Navy Week along with the Flag officer and Navy Band are active duty and reserve Navy Public Affairs Officers, local civic organizations, as well as local sailors and recruiters from the regional Navy Recruiting District (NRD). In addition, crew members from a namesake ship will participate in the Navy Week (i.e., sailors from the USS Cleveland visit the city of Cleveland during Cleveland Navy Week.)
