= Navy Weeks =

Navy awareness community event

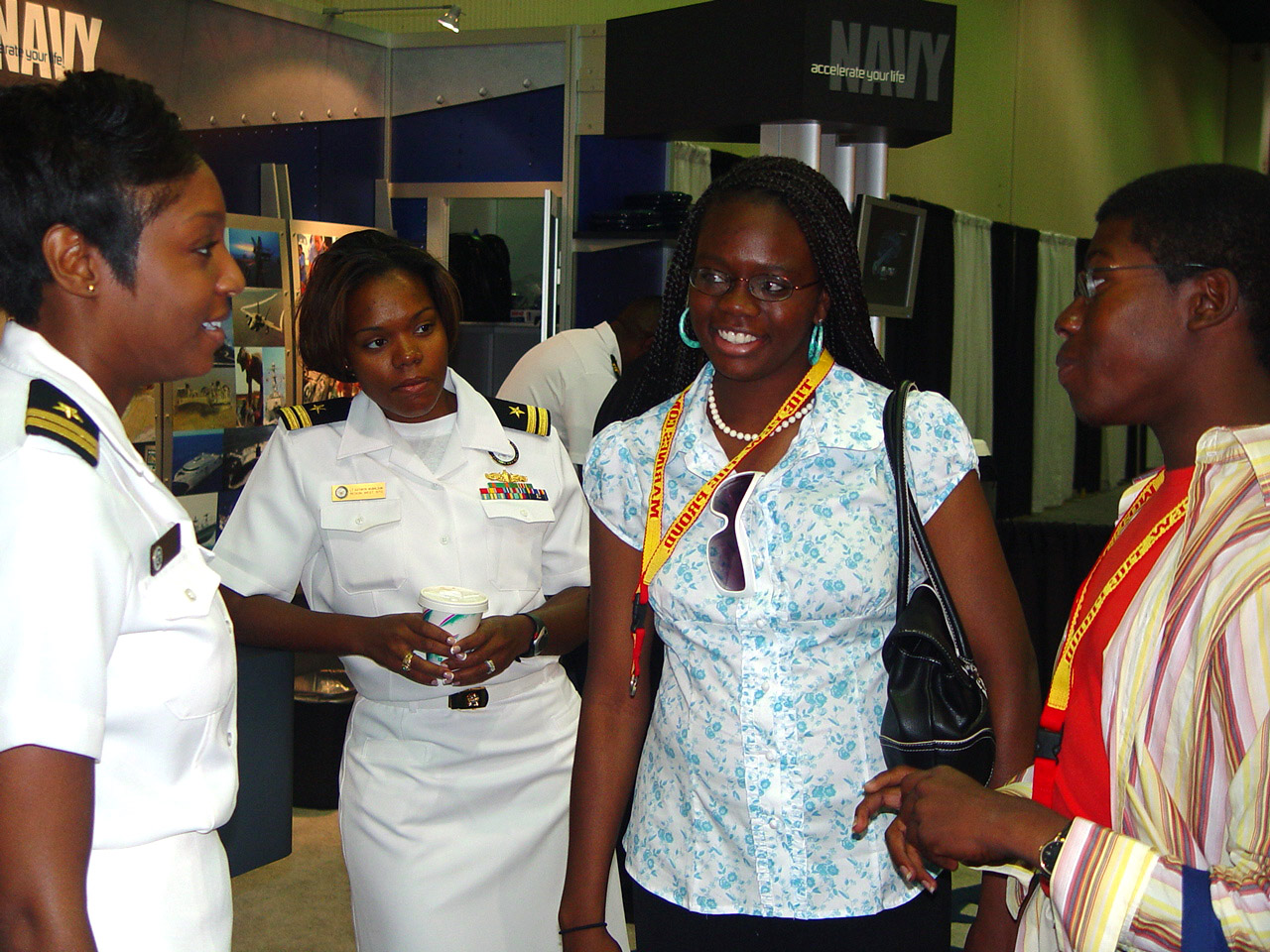
Naval recruiters talking to prospective recruits in Detroit during the 2007 Navy Week.

Navy Weeks are designed to educate Americans on the importance of Naval service, understand the investment they make in their Navy and to increase awareness in cities which might not otherwise see the Navy at work on a regular basis.

== History ==
Navy Weeks are organized around an "anchor event" or large community event such as a state fair or a public holiday celebration. By planning Navy Weeks around or in conjunction with these larger public events, Navy Week participants are able to increase the awareness of a larger number of people from diverse geographic areas in regions all across the United States.

About 20 Navy Weeks are led by the Navy Office of Community Outreach (NAVCO) each year. Cities and towns are selected based on a wide range of criteria with careful consideration given to aspects such as anchor events, Blue Angels air shows, asset availability, city size, demographic make-up, geographic region, relationship building, relationship sustainment and new outreach opportunities.

A typical Navy Week has two main elements:

- A regional Navy Band's Top-40 rock group or Jazz ensemble will perform in the selected city at multiple locations.
- A Navy Admiral or Flag Officer will speak to civic and educational organizations at various public speaking engagements in the area. Admirals from commands throughout the world volunteer to participate and in many cases they have a tie to the community, e.g., they attended high school in the area. The typical speaking venues are rotary club meetings, colleges, TV and news radio shows and other non-profit groups such as Lions Clubs and Project Hope. Speaking topics include:
1. Our Maritime Strategy and the purpose of our Naval forces.
2. Effectively using the Navy's budget.
3. Information on what events are planned for the Navy Week.

Participating in any given Navy Week along with the Flag officer and Navy Band are active-duty and reserve Navy Public Affairs Officers, local civic organizations, as well as local sailors and recruiters from the regional Navy Recruiting District (NRD). In addition, crew members from a namesake ship will participate in the Navy Week (e.g., sailors from the USS Cleveland visit the city of Cleveland during Cleveland Navy Week).

== Gallery ==
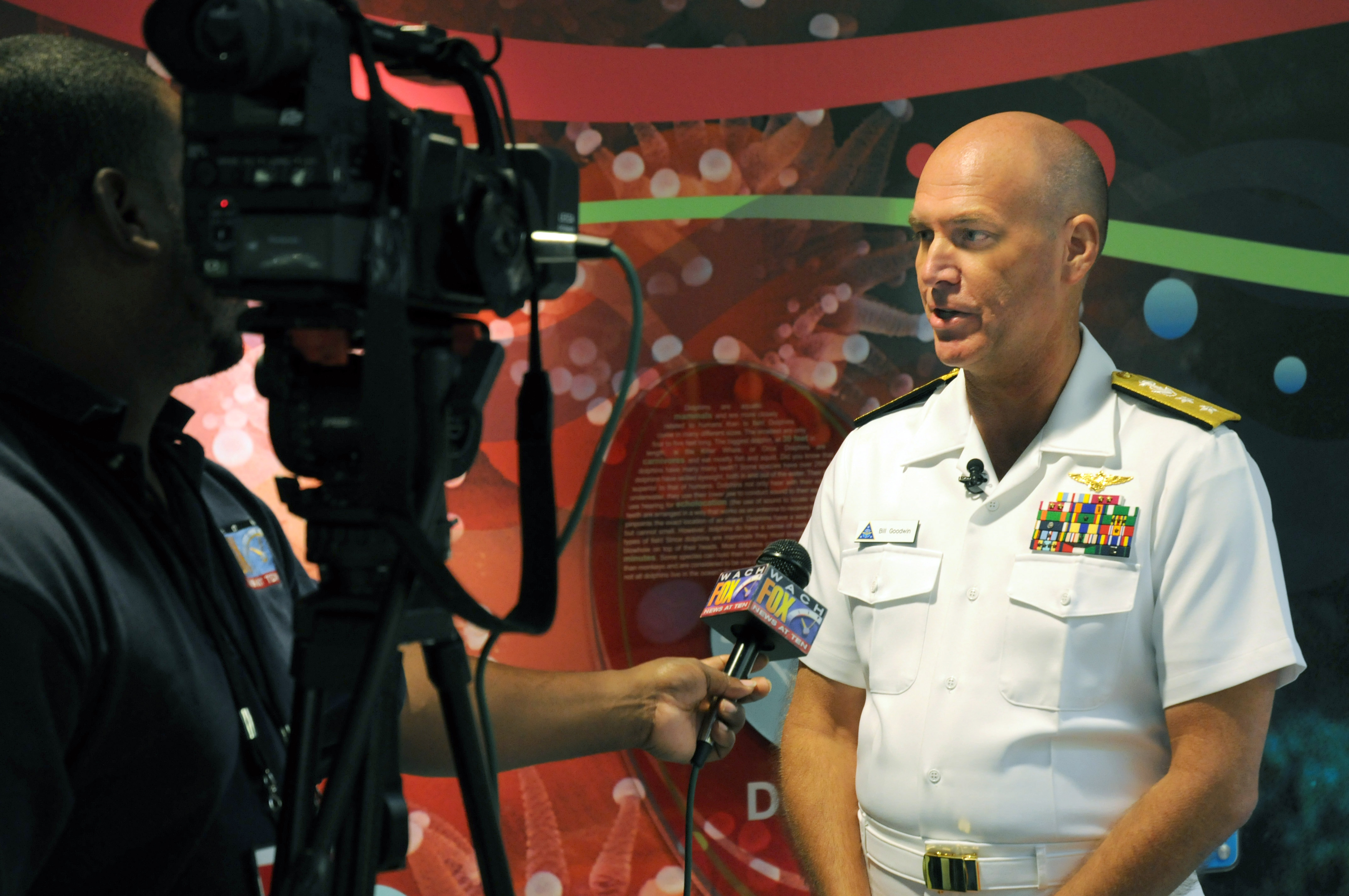
Rear Adm. John Goodwin, commander, Naval Air Forces Atlantic and the ambassador for Columbia Navy Week 2008, talks to local media at Palmetto Health Children's Hospital prior to a "Caps for Kids" event.

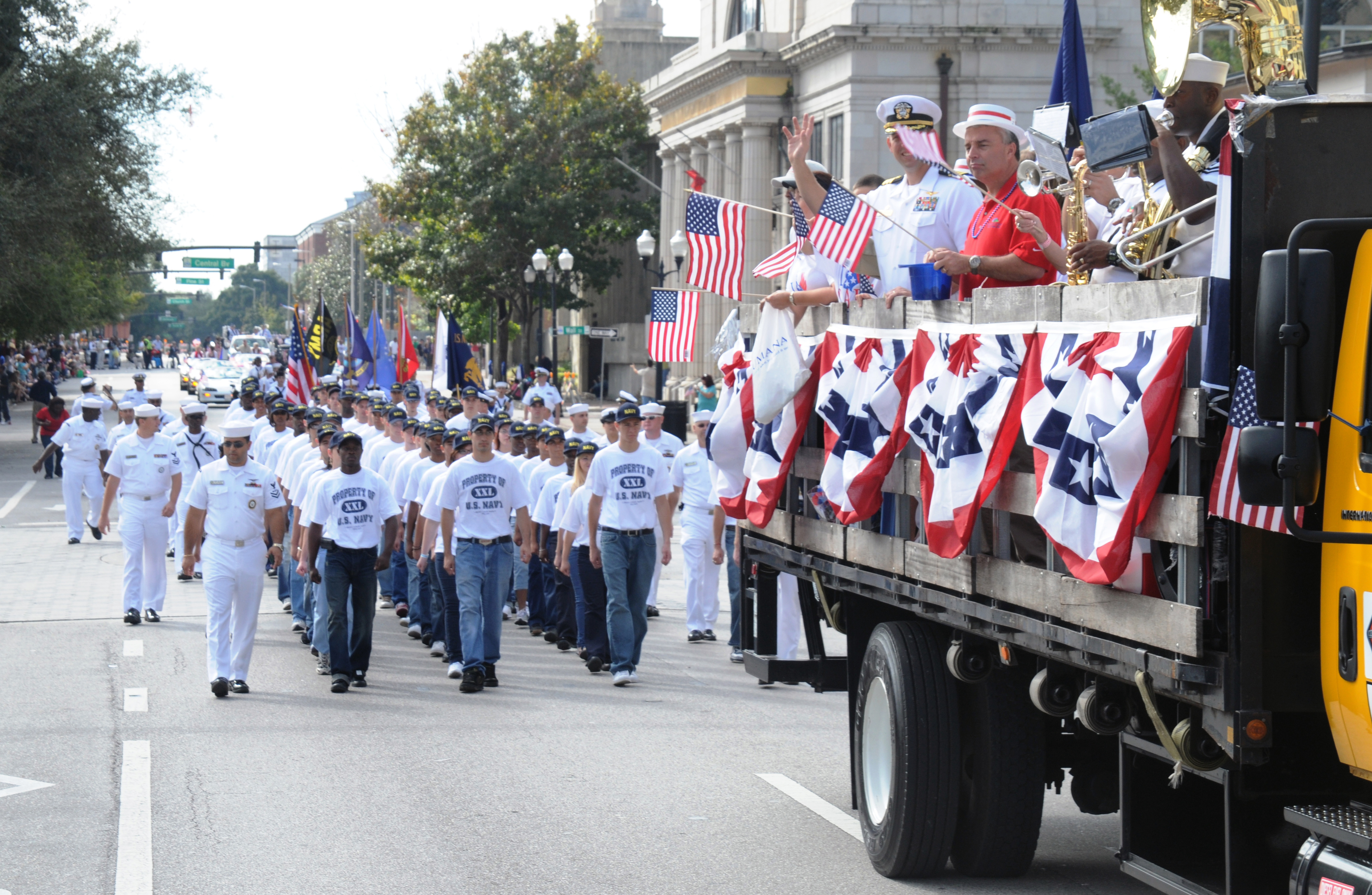
A group of delayed entry program recruits follows behind a truck full of Sailors during the Orlando, Fla., Veterans Day Parade.

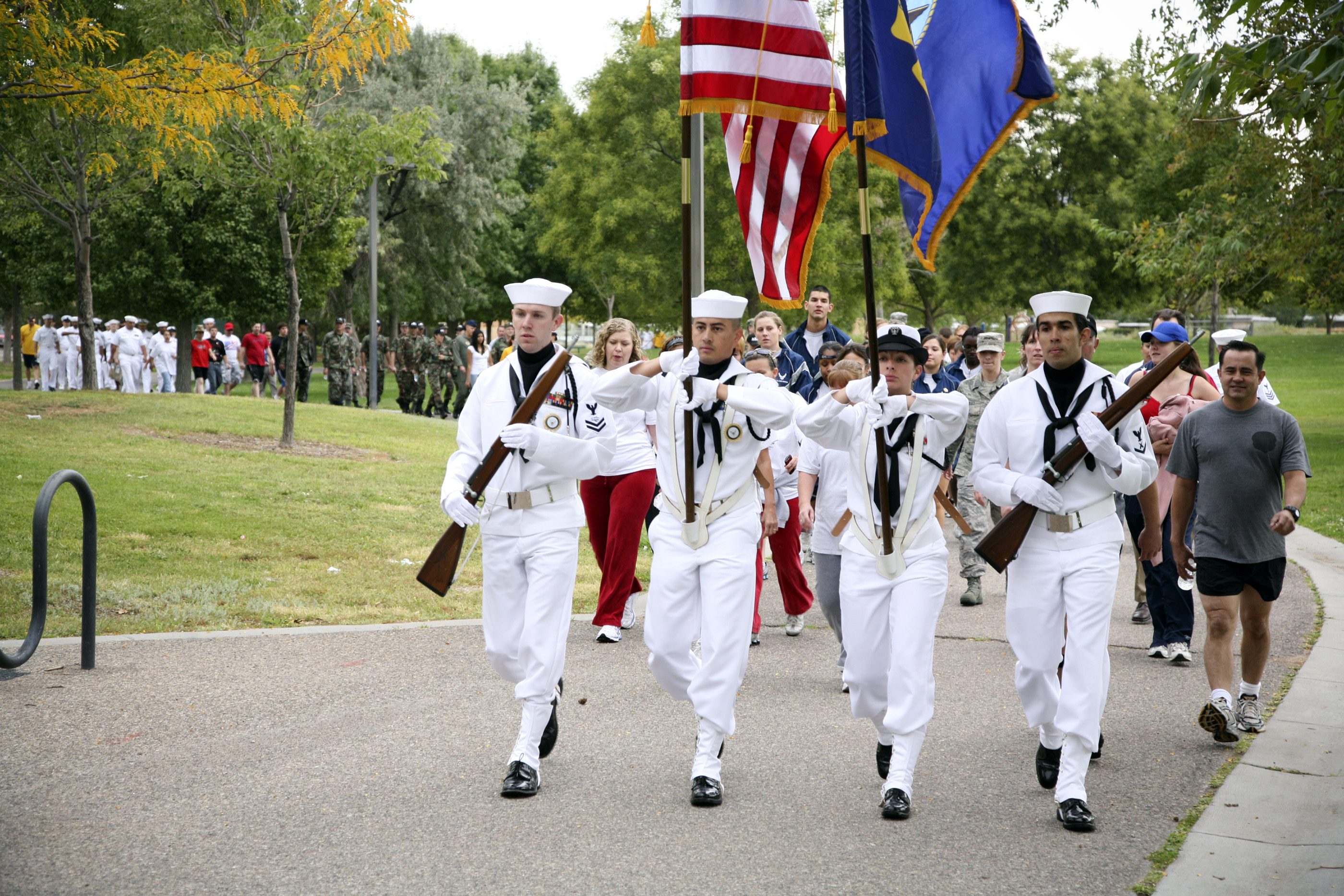
A Navy honor guard leads service members assigned to Kirtland Air Force Base and community supporters in an America Supports You Freedom Walk.

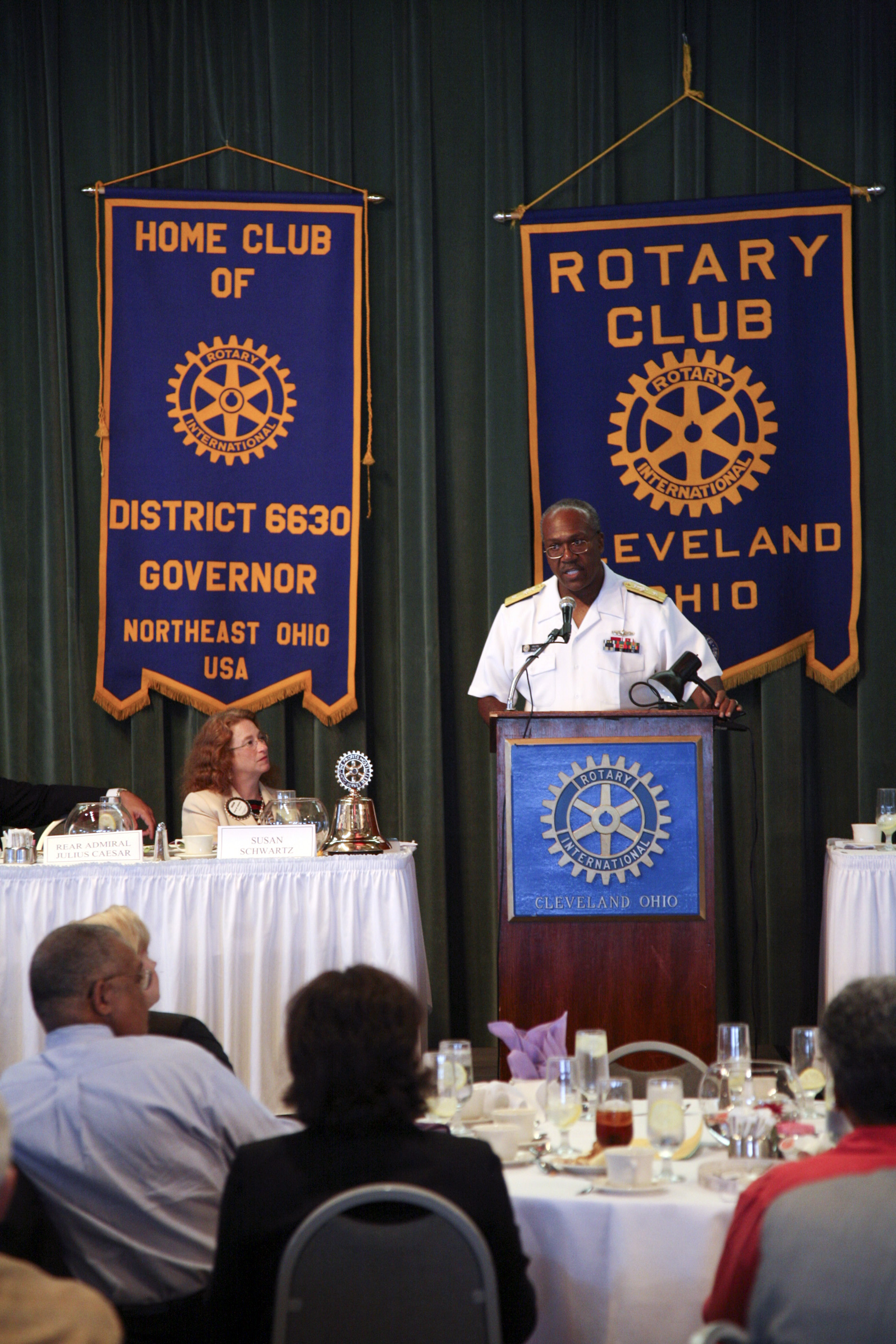
Rear Adm. Julius Caesar, Reserve deputy commander, Navy Installations Command, speaks to business and community leaders of the Cleveland Rotary Club.

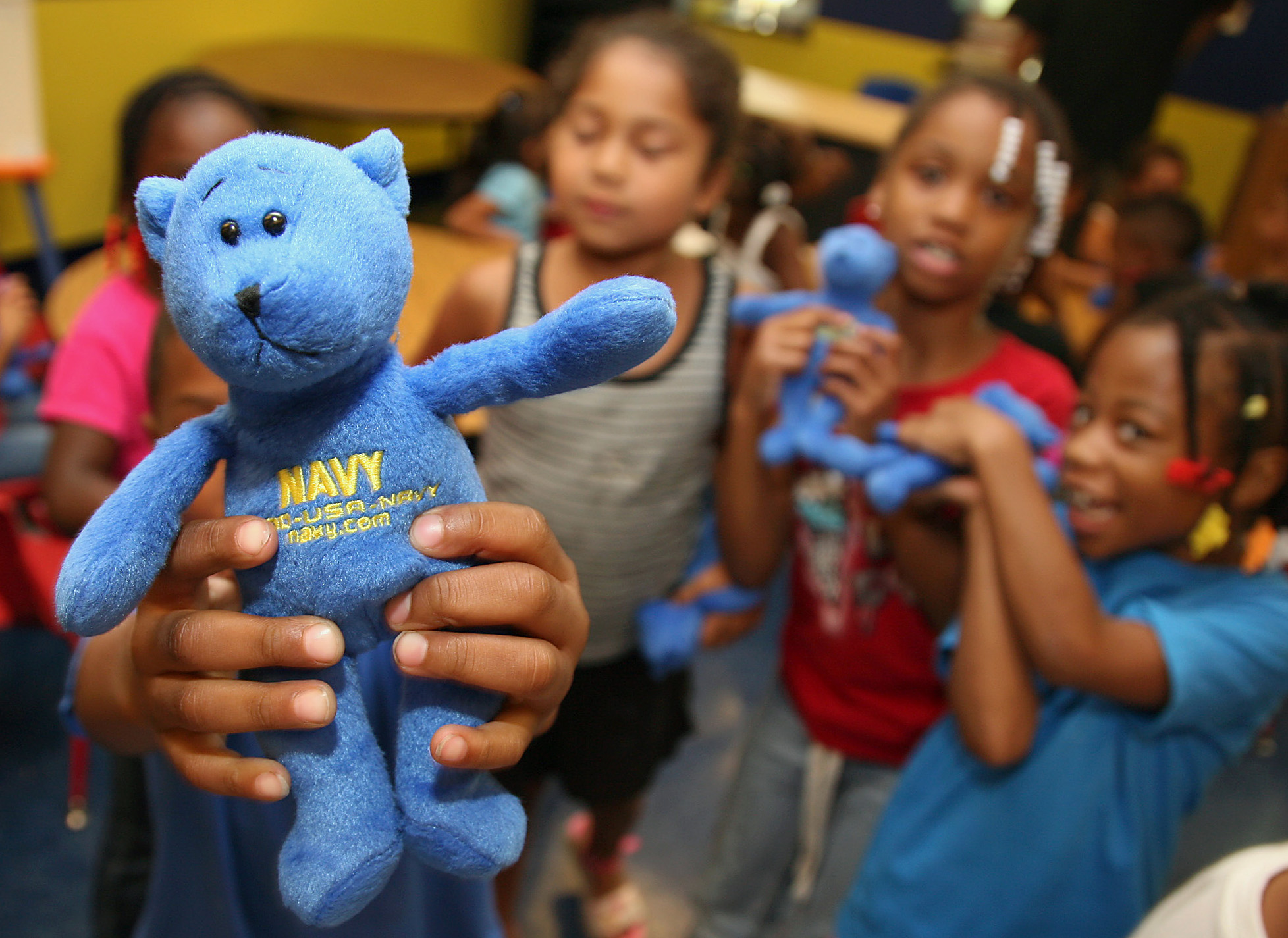
Children at the Boys and Girls Club of Chicago show off their Navy "Blue Bears" given to them during a visit by Vice Adm. David J. Venlet.

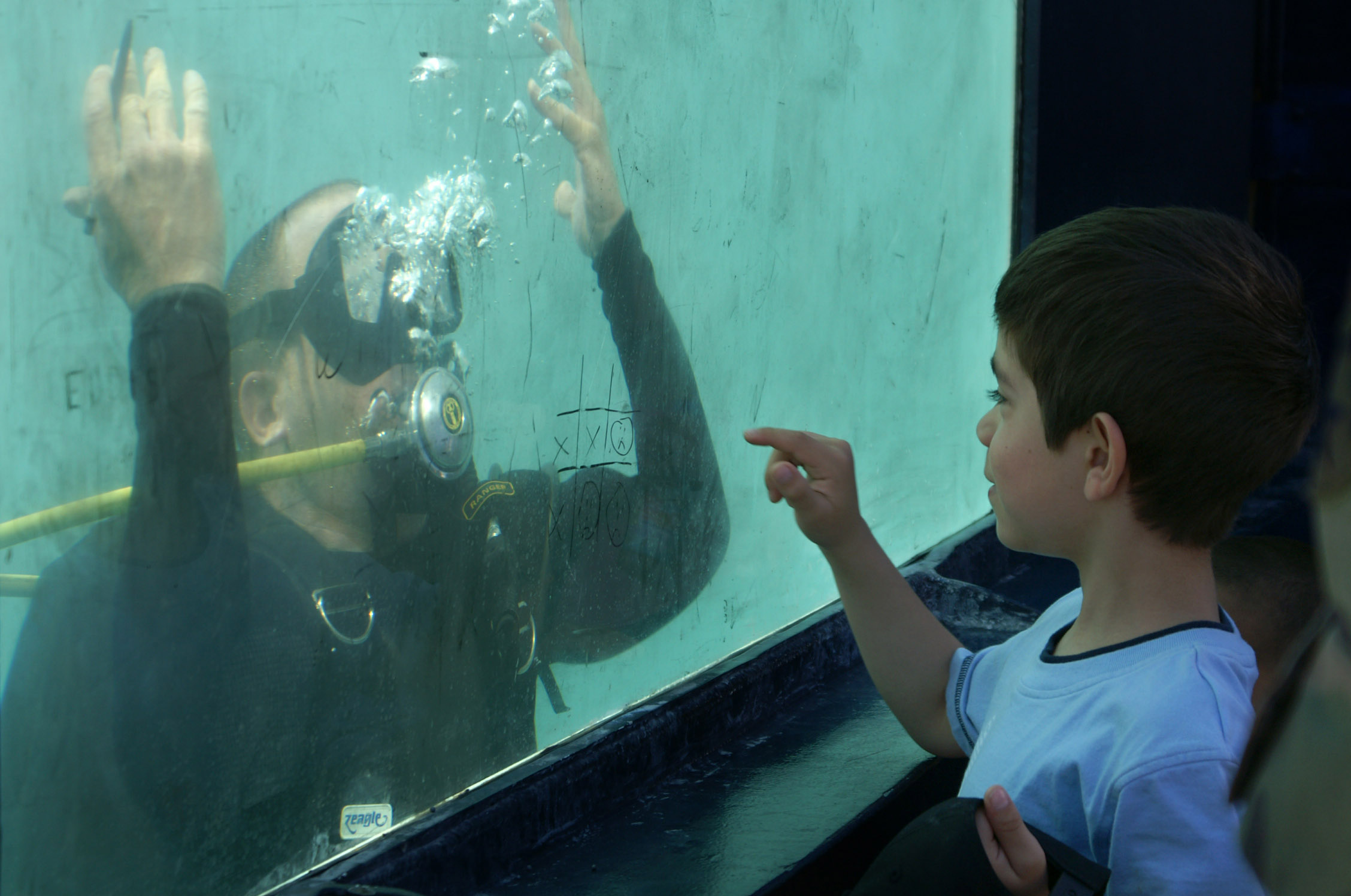
Explosive Ordnance Disposal 1st Class Rick Cote reacts after losing a game of tic-tac-toe with a young boy.

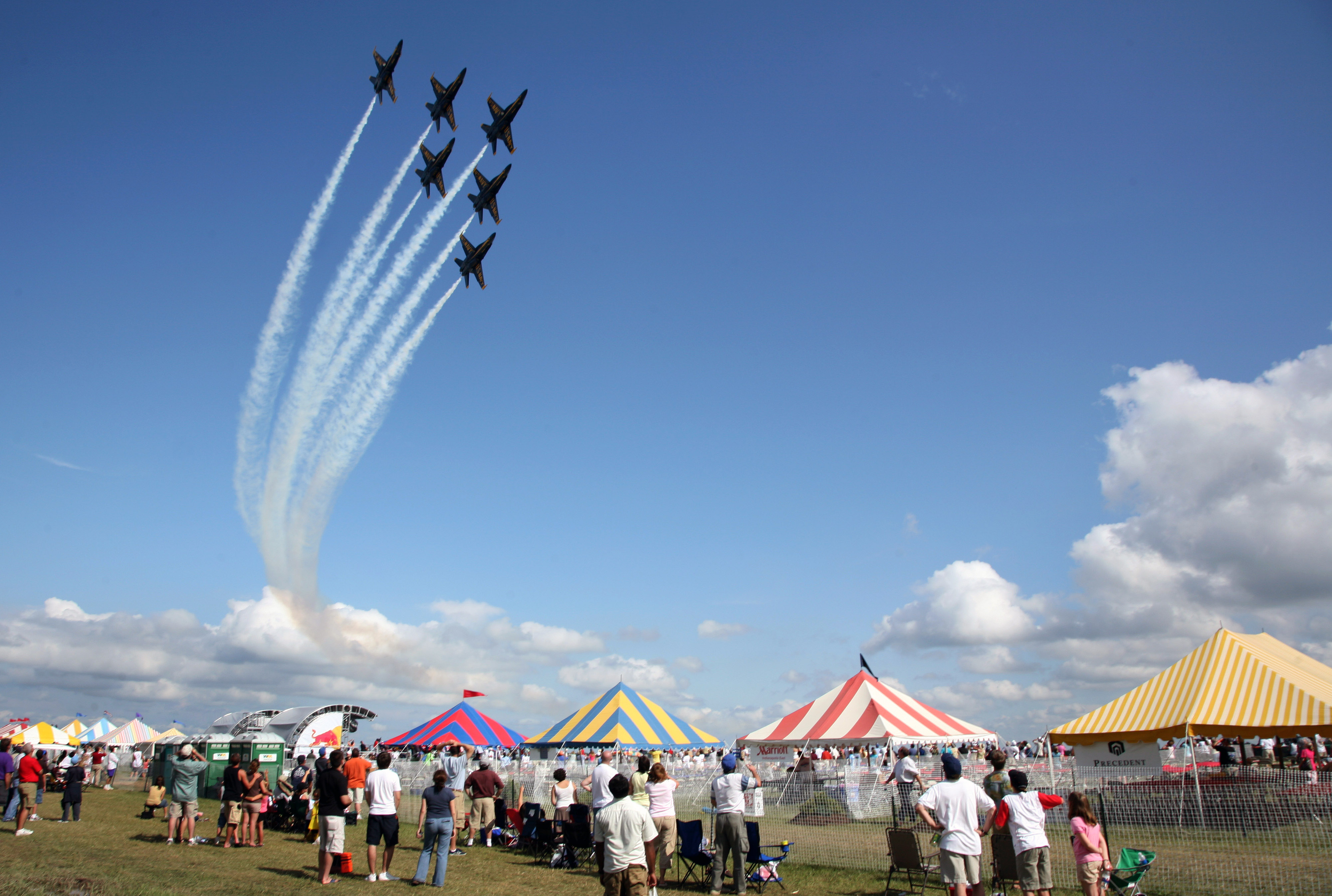
The Navy's Flight Demonstration team, the Blue Angels, perform their delta formation during the Indianapolis Air Show.

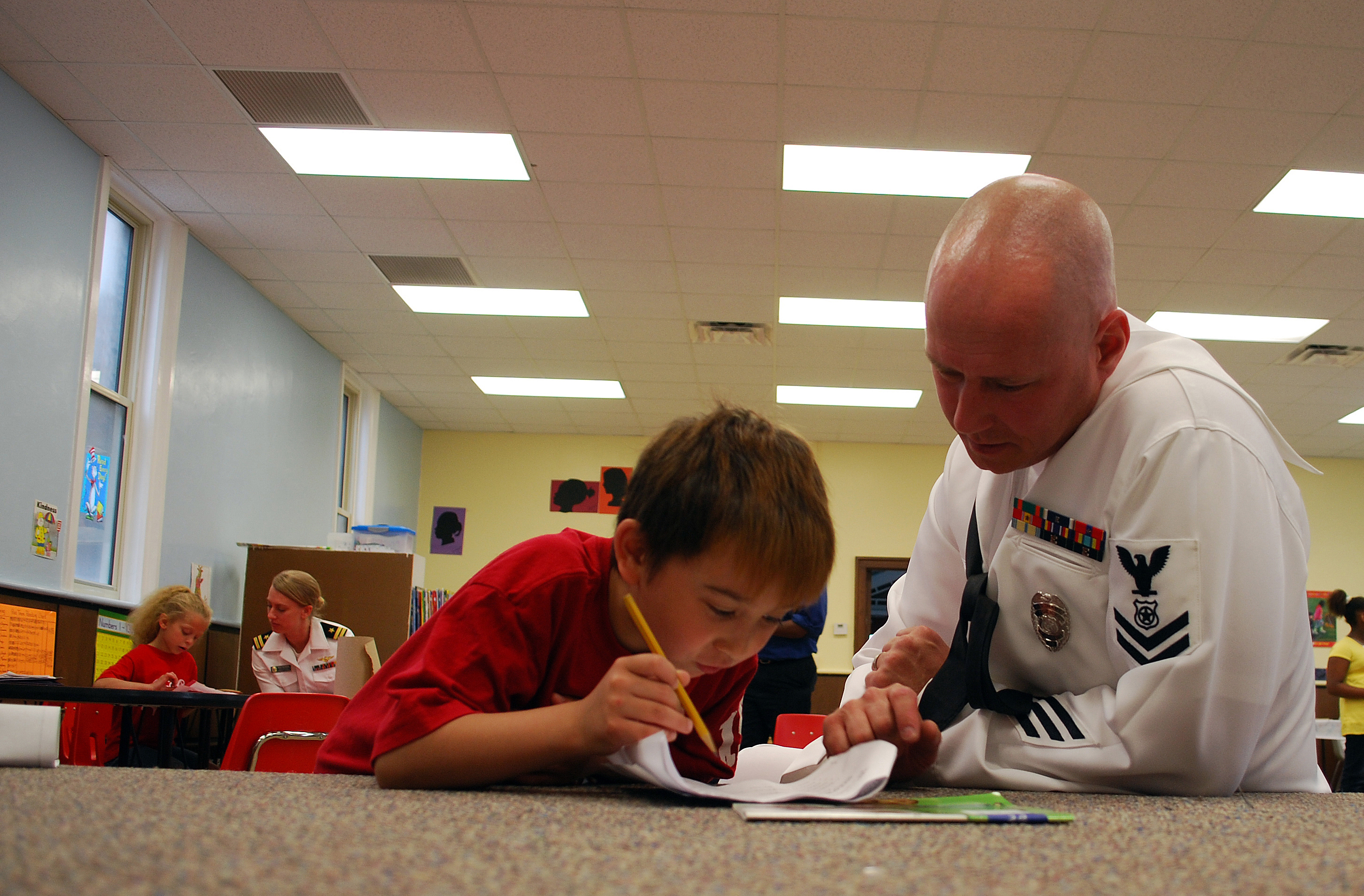
Petty Officer 2nd Class Jeff Kline, helps a child with homework at the Cameron Community Ministries after school program during Rochester Navy week

== See also ==
- Fleet Week
