= Marine Corps Musician Enlistment Option Program =

Organizaitonal body for Marine bands

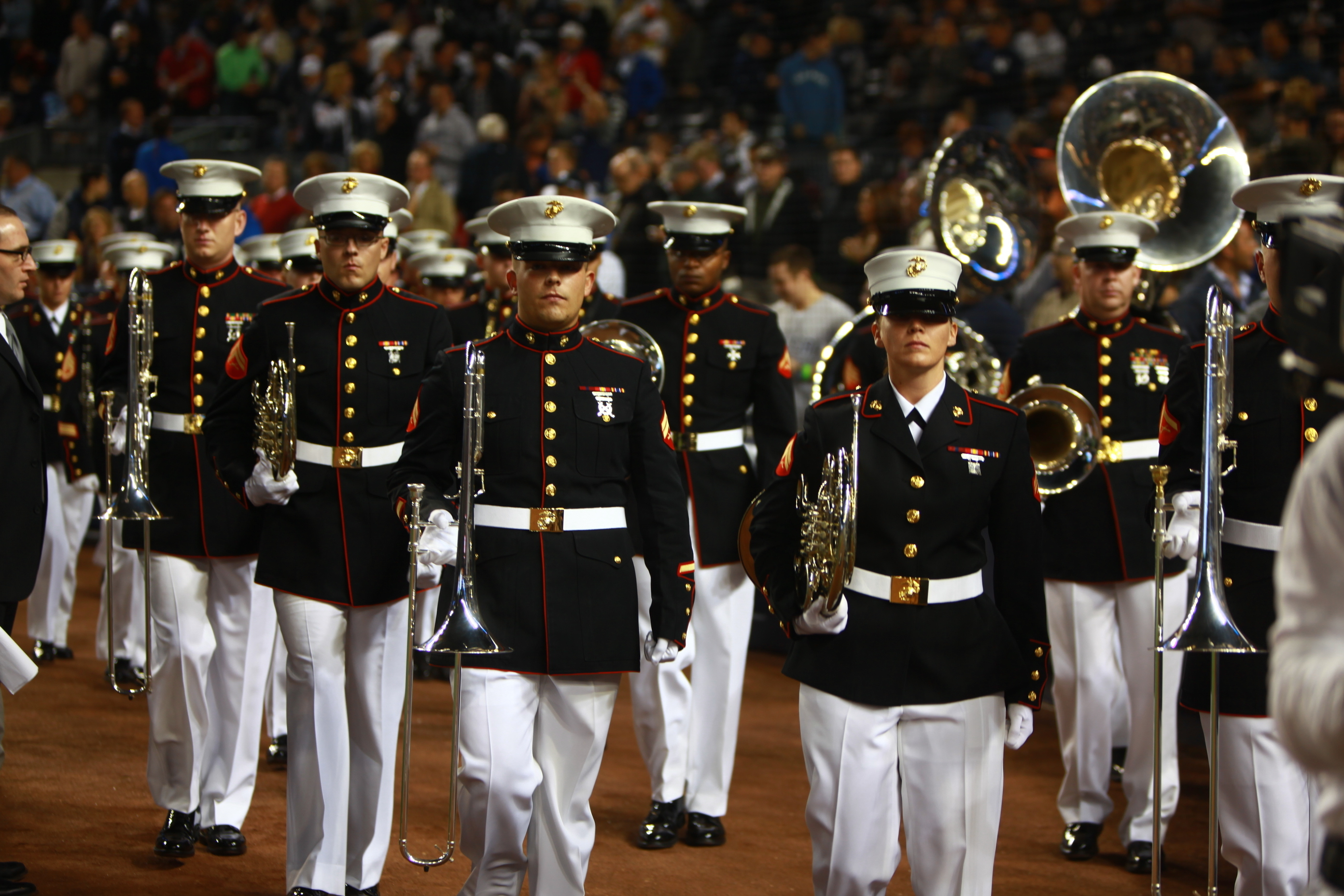
The 2nd Marine Aircraft Wing Band performing at Yankee Stadium. The band is one of ten field bands sponsored by the program.

The Marine Corps Musician Enlistment Option Program (MEOP) is the central organized body overseeing the active-duty military bands of the United States Marine Corps. Marine Corps field bands can be found in the Southeast United States, Southern California, and the Pacific-Asia region. While serving with their bands, Marines perform throughout the continental United States and travel internationally to locations ranging from Beijing to Paris. These units take part in activities such as retirement ceremonies, the Marine Corps Birthday Ball, funerals, change of commands, and civil/military parades. It is one of two music programs in the Department of the Navy, with the other being Fleet Band Activities.

== Overview of Marine bands ==
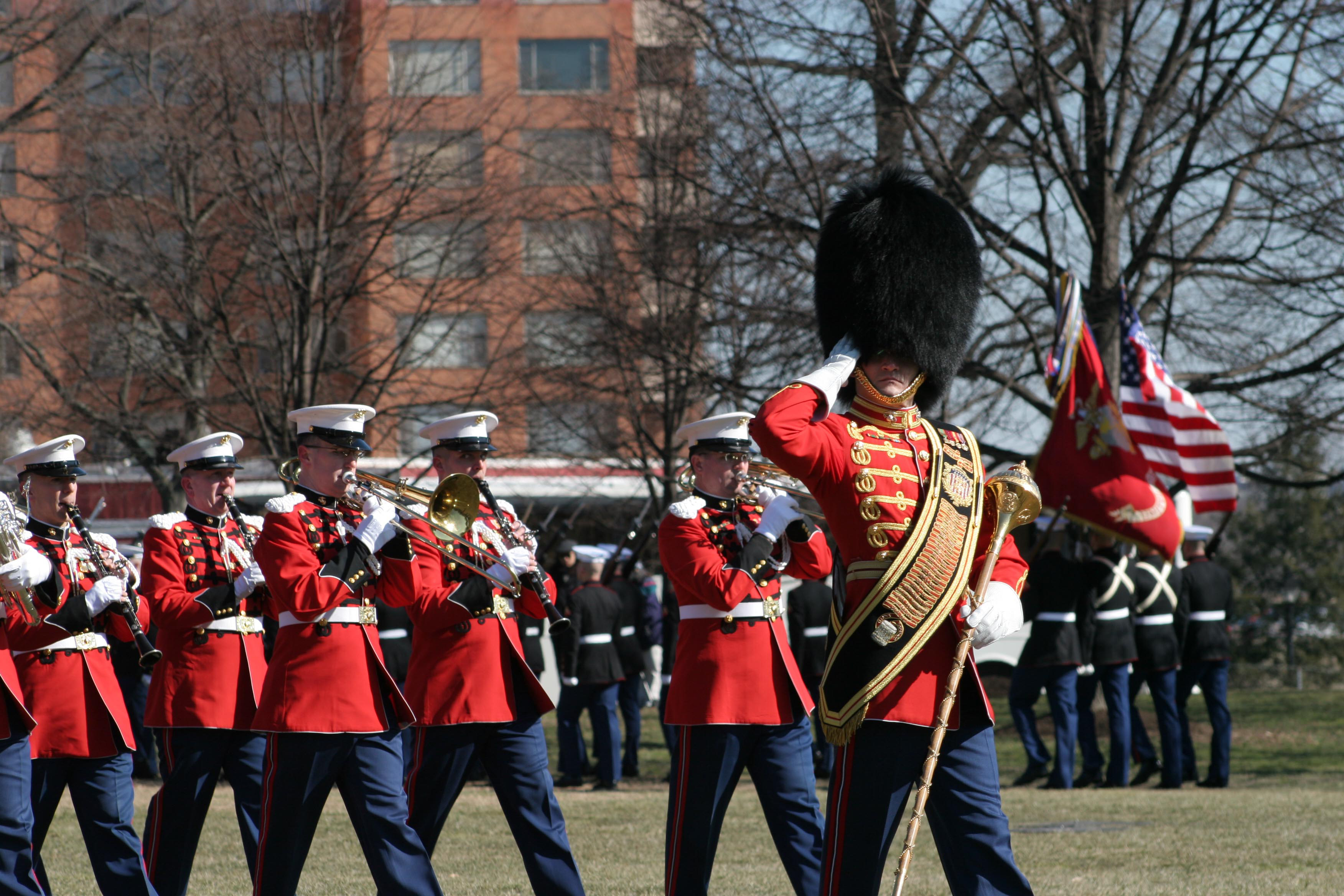
The Drum Major of the United States Marine Band leading the band during a military parade.

All USMC field bands are required to perform as a range of ensembles such as ceremonial band and big band. Additionally, the bands are required to engage in regular Marine training and uphold the standards for Marines. When deployed on duty, Marine bands serve as provisional rifle platoons and rear area security for the commanding officer. Individual musicians can also request for augmentation into combat arms units.

=== Training ===
All Marine musicians are required to audition for a placement in the music program. They then go through recruit training at one of two Marine bases. Upon graduation, musicians attend the United States Navy School of Music in Virginia. The first Marine Corps students were enrolled in the school of music in 1947. During their stay at the school, they attend a six-month basic music course, which involves weekly private instrumental instruction, ear training, as well as music theory. After their training is complete, Marine musicians are then transferred to their bands for permanent duty.

== List of Marine bands ==
The United States Marine Band is the USMC's central band and the seniormost band in the USMC. It is a premier ensemble, which means that its duties are of a high natures and includes duties in Washington D.C., the national capital. The United States Marine Drum and Bugle Corps is another USMC premier ensemble based in the national capital.

There are also 10 field bands maintained by Marine wings/divisions:

- Quantico Marine Corps Band (Quantico, Virginia)
- Parris Island Marine Band (Parris Island, South Carolina)
- Marine Corps Band San Diego (San Diego, California)
- 1st Marine Division Band (Camp Pendleton, California)
- 2nd Marine Division Band (Camp Lejeune, North Carolina)
- 2nd Marine Aircraft Wing Band (Cherry Point, North Carolina)
- 3rd Marine Aircraft Wing Band (Miramar, San Diego, California)
- Marine Corps Forces, Pacific Band (Marine Corps Base Hawaii)
- III Marine Expeditionary Force Band (Camp Courtney, Japan)
- Marine Forces Reserve Band (New Orleans, Louisiana)

The ad hoc West Coast Composite Band and East Coast Composite Band is also maintained. The former is often available at the Rose Parade in California while the latter often performs at the Macy's Thanksgiving Day Parade in New York. Bands not currently in service have included the Marine Corps Air Ground Combat Center Twentynine Palms Band and the Albany Marine Band.

== Other Marine bands ==
=== Leatherneck Pipes and Drums ===
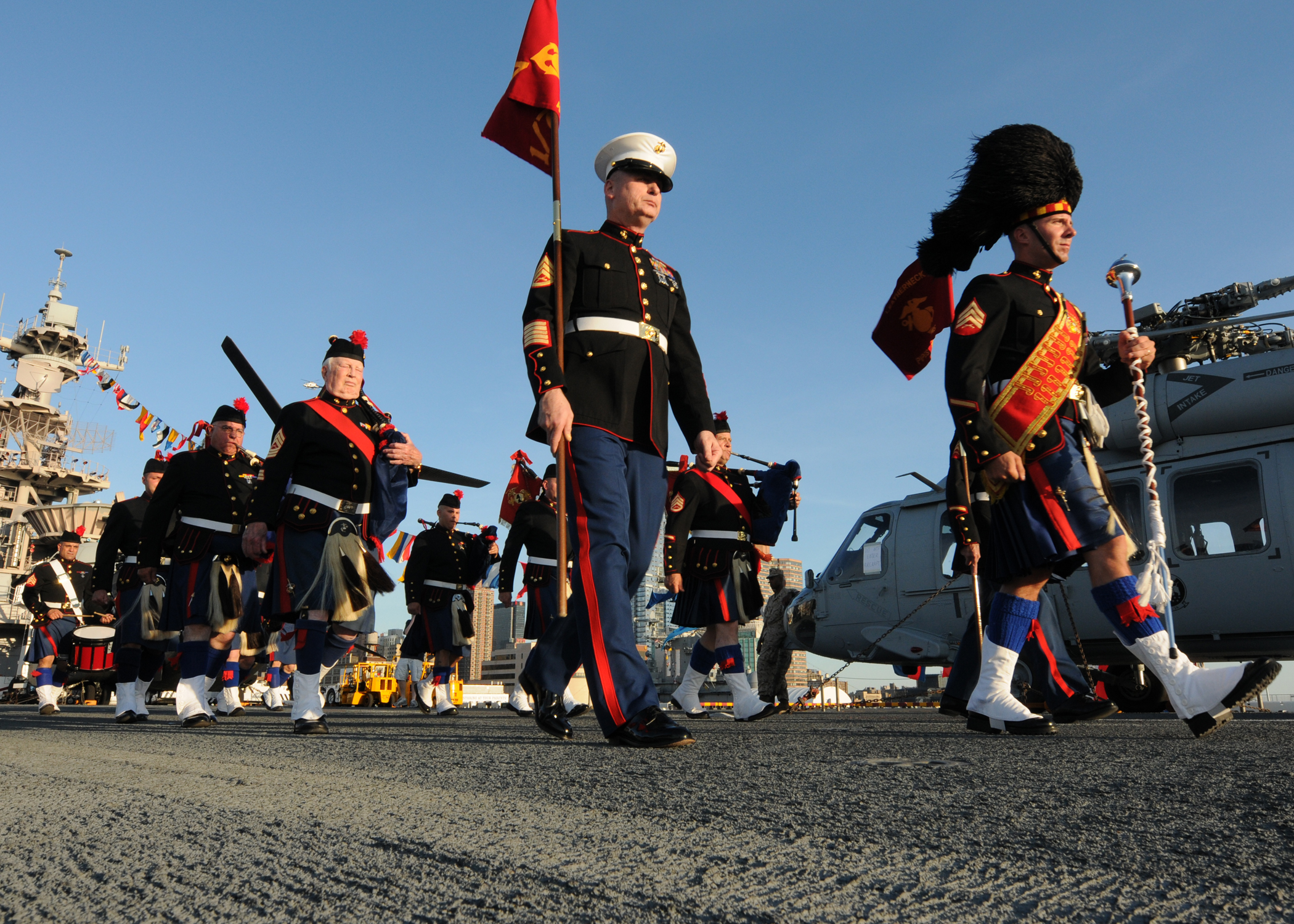
The Leatherneck Pipes and Drums rehearse prior to a Sunset Parade on the flight deck of the USS Iwo Jima.

The Leatherneck Pipes and Drums is a private military pipe band that supports military ceremonies in the USMC. Being a private unit, it is composed of mostly former USMC personnel. It was formed in 1991 from Marine veterans who lived in parts of the Northeastern United States and was based on the original Marine pipe band based in Derry, Northern Ireland during the Second World War. The official tartan of the unit is the Leatherneck Tartan which is only used by the pipes and drums due to the fact that the USMC has never formally adopted a military tartan. During many of its ceremonies, the band performs special arrangements of the Star Spangled Banner and The Marines' Hymn. When at an official ceremony, all members of the unit wear a modified Blue Dress "A" uniform which is augmented with a Glengarry cap and a kilt that is patterned in the leatherneck tartan. Keeping in Highland/Scottish tradition, the drum major wears feather bonnet instead of a Glengarry.

=== Band of America's Few ===
Created in 2009, the Band of America's Few is a nonprofit USMC musical unit organized by Marine retirees and veterans. Most of the musicians were assigned to the Marine Corps field bands in the past.

=== Marine All-Star Jazz Band ===
From 2007-2019, a composite jazz ensemble was created from musicians across all of Marine music to support recruiting and community events across the United States. Notable performances include the Monterey Jazz Festival, Lakeside Jazz Festival, Texas Music Educators Association and various university and college performances. The Marine All-Star Jazz Band was later named the Marine Corps Jazz Orchestra.

== See also ==
- United States military bands
- Fleet Band Activities
- List of United States Air Force bands
- Navy bands in Canada
- Royal Marines Band Service
