= Musician (United States Navy) =

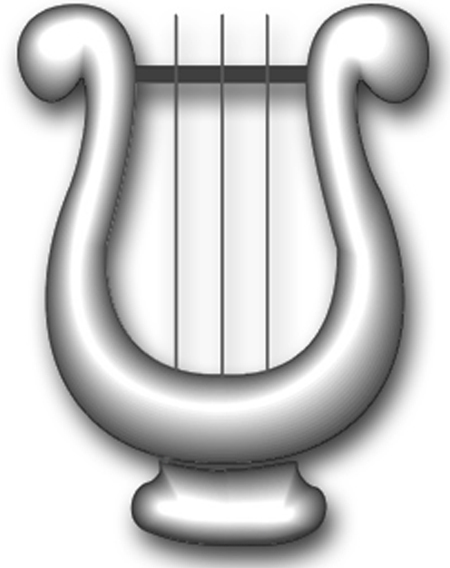
- Rating insignia
- Issued by: United States Navy
- Type: Enlisted rating
- Abbreviation: MU
- Specialty: Administration

Musician (abbreviated as MU) is a United States Navy occupational rating.

Musicians perform on one or more designated instruments to provide musical services on board ships and at Armed Forces bases to inspire patriotism, elevate esprit de corps, enhance retention, and foster pride in the Naval service; provide musical services off base that reinforce recruiting efforts; provide musical services to the general public, therefore increasing community awareness, promoting respect, and enhancing the reputation of the Navy; and perform other musical skills as may be required in performance of the rating.

== See also ==
- List of United States Navy ratings
- United States Navy Band
- Navy Music Program § The United States Navy Band
- Fleet bands
- Navy School of Music
- United States Naval Academy Band
