= United States Navy Steel Band =

Former US military musical group

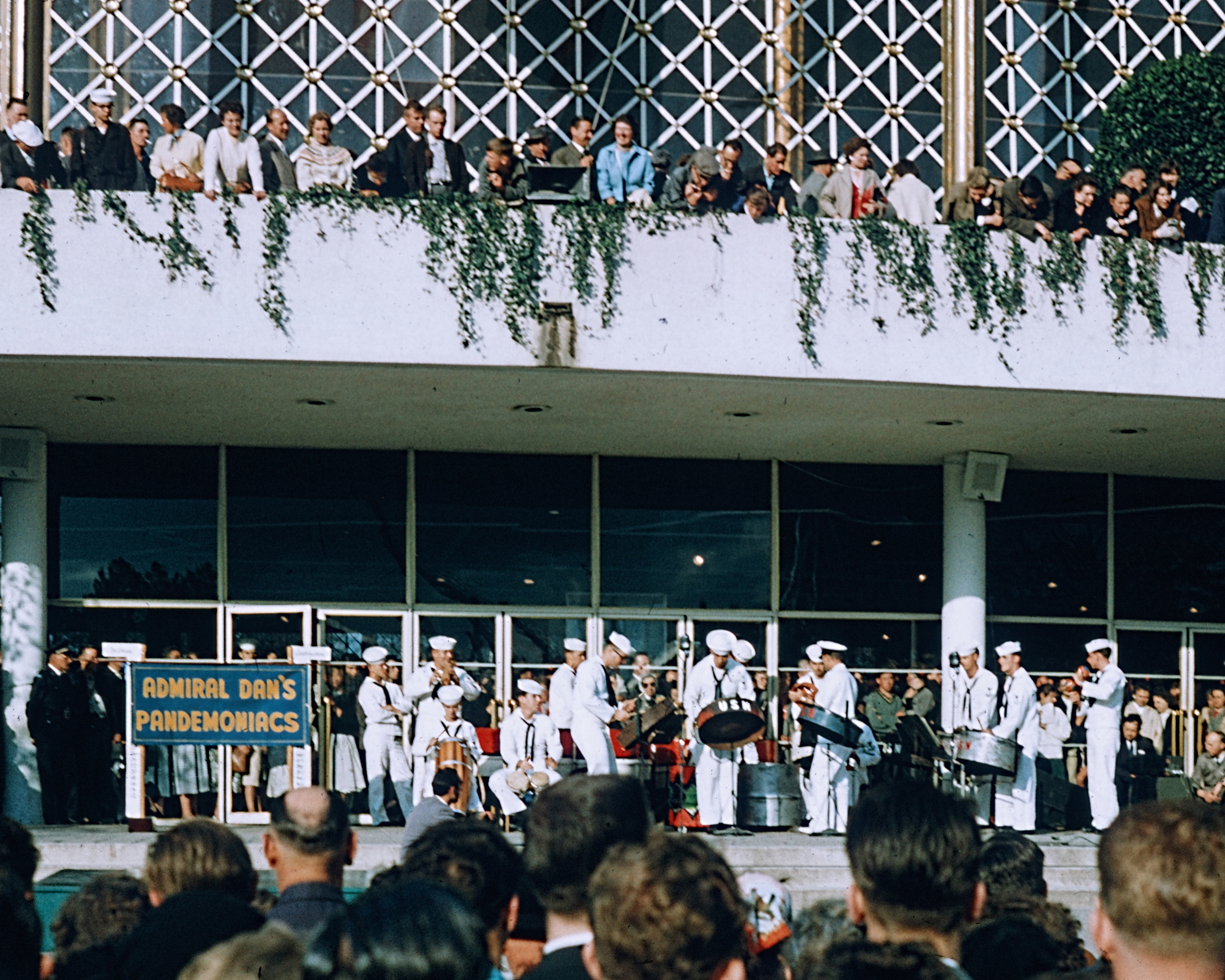
US Navy Steel Band performing outside US Pavilion at the 1958 Brussels World's Fair (Expo 58).

The US Navy Steel Band was the first all-American and only military steel band. It was organized in 1957 by Rear Admiral Daniel V. Gallery, from the band assigned to him, while he was commander of the Tenth Naval District in San Juan, Puerto Rico. The band was originally called Admiral Dan's Pandemonaics and this remained as a subname after they became the US Navy Steel Band. The band was stationed in Puerto Rico until 1973, when they moved to New Orleans, LA. From there, stationed at Naval Support Activity New Orleans in the Algiers section of the city, they increased their performance schedule. Between 1973 and 1979， alone the band traveled over a million and a half miles, and performed as many as 500 concerts a year. They were disbanded in 1999.

Their first recording, in 1957, under the direction of Chief Musician Charles A. Roeper, on the Decca label, was an LP called "Pan-Demonia". Among their other recordings are an LP called Blowin' in the Wind that was co-issued by the Puerto Rico Council and the U. S. Navy League; it features numerous popular songs of the day and some traditional Puerto Rican songs (all instrumentals).
