= Seventh Fleet Band =

United States military band in Yokosuka, Japan

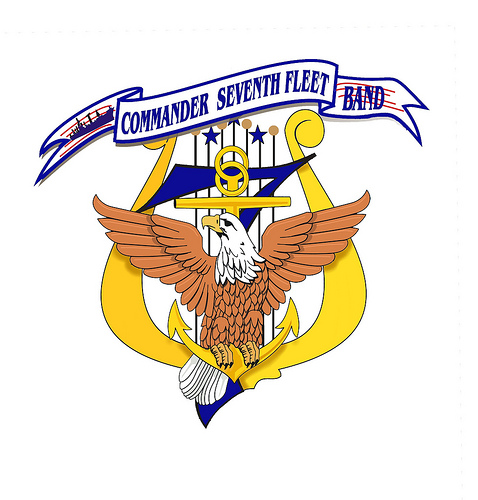
Logo

The United States Seventh Fleet Band is a United States Navy military band in Yokosuka, Japan. It is composed of professional navy musicians and operates under the direct control and supervision of Fleet Band Activities, the official navy music program. It serves aboard the Seventh Fleet flagship, the USS Blue Ridge. It was created upon the renaming of the Southwest Pacific Force on 7 March 1943. The Seventh Fleet Band is today composed of six professional ensembles, all of which have performed for millions of people throughout the Western Pacific Ocean. Countries it has performed in include Japan, the Philippines, South Korea, Australia, Thailand, Hong Kong, Malaysia, Singapore, Indonesia, as well as many other cities and countries of the Far East.

The band has used the traditional costumes of these countries in its routines. One of its more notable members was Ralph M. Gambone, who later served as officer in charge of the United States Navy Band from 1998 to 2007.

== Composition ==
The band leadership consists of the fleet bandmaster and the senior enlisted leader. The band has the following ensembles:

- Ceremonial Marching Band
- Pacific Ambassadors
- Far East Edition
- Orient Express
- Shiokaze Chamber Ensemble
- Shonan Brass Quintet

=== Far East Edition ===
It was established in 1974 and is a popular music ensemble known for its transforming itself from a brass band to a rock band to a jazz combo. It can be heard playing traditional New Orleans-style jazz, classic rock, and local regional favorites. It has been featured at major events throughout the Indo-Asia Pacific region and have entertained hundreds of thousands of people over the years.

=== Orient Express ===
The Orient Express is a nine-member group of professional rock musicians performing live examples of English-language rock, including covers of songs ranging from Stevie Wonder or Journey, to Avril Lavigne to Katy Perry. Orient Express also performs as a Smooth Jazz ensemble, as well as a full-range Dixieland Band. Leadership of this group is coordinated on a talent and personnel level.

=== Pacific Ambassadors ===
The Pacific Ambassadors is a 20-piece show band operating in a variety of musical styles, ranging from traditional to contemporary Jazz, Big Band, Latin, and other popular music genres of today. It has been featured as a main attraction at major international cultural events throughout Australia and the Far East, covering more mileage squared than any other navy band operating today.

=== Ceremonial Marching Band ===
Marching band performs for official military and civic ceremonies, as well as providing official representation of the Commander, Seventh Fleet during musical performance at public concerts throughout the Western Pacific & Asian areas. In 2012, the band began to attend the "International Military Tattoo" in Hong Kong to replace the United States 8th Army Band.

== Gallery ==
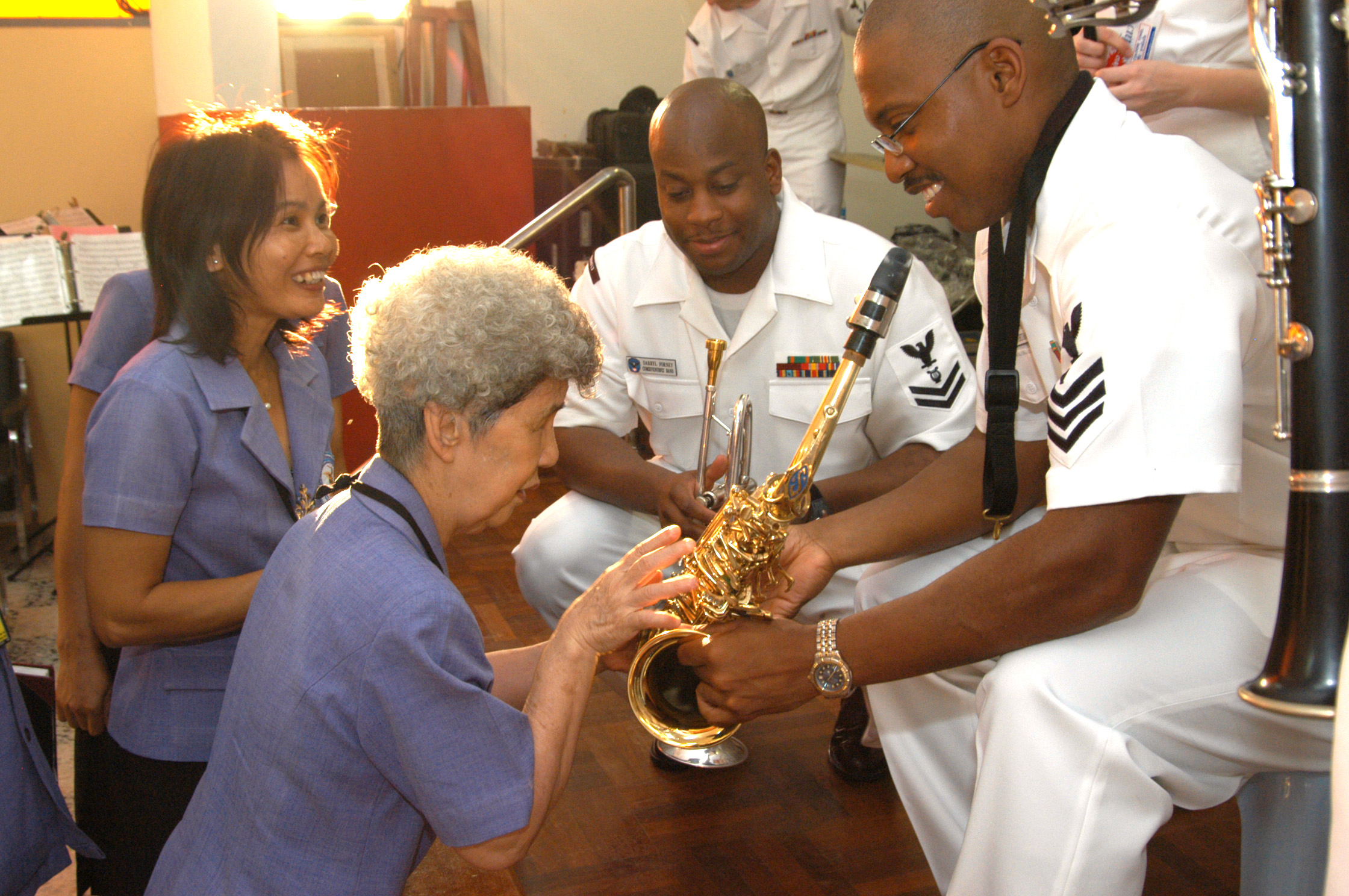
Members of the Seventh Fleet band engaging in cultural diplomacy at the Pattaya Redemptorist School for the Blind.

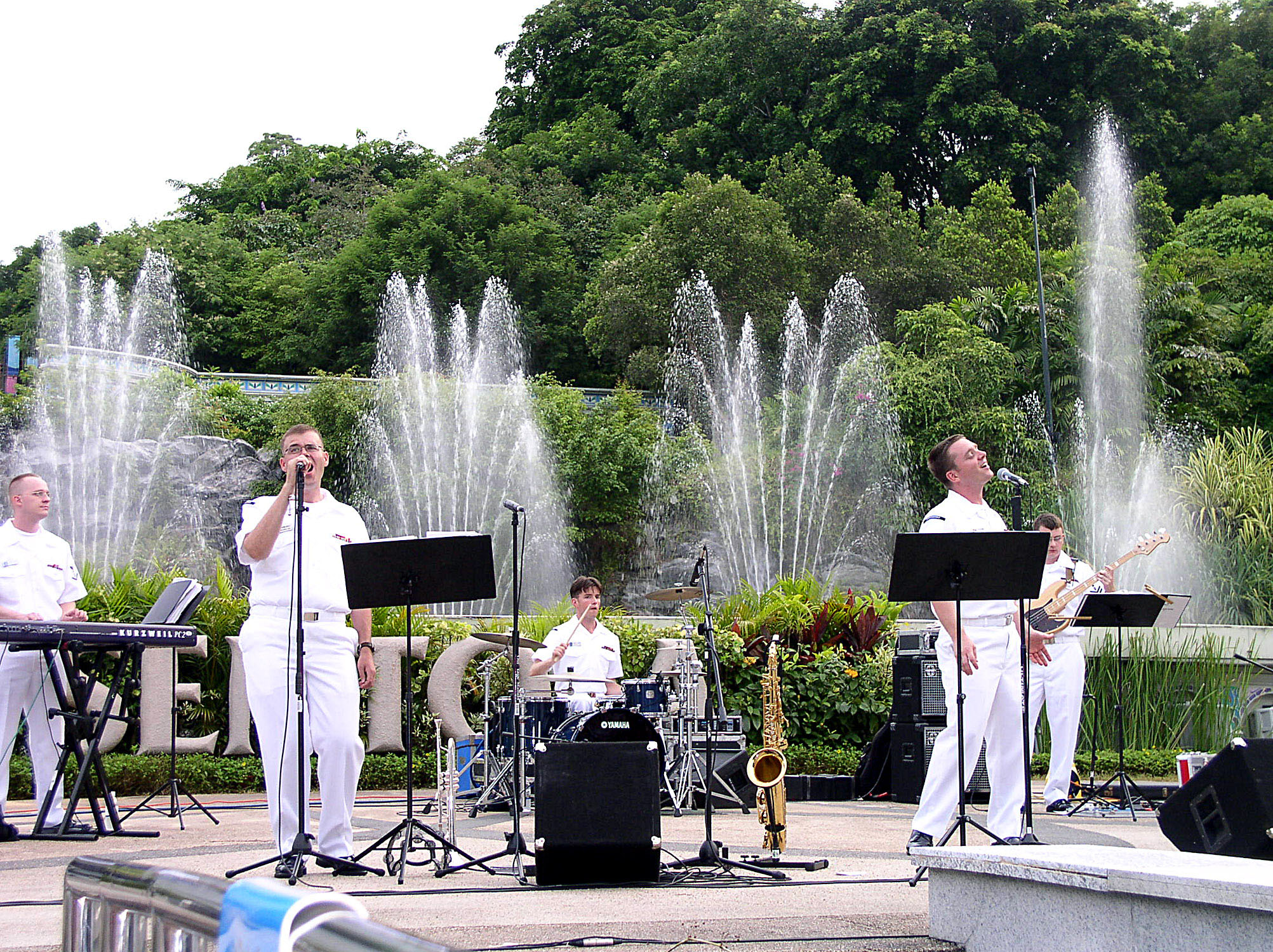
The band performing for visitors on the platform of the Sentosa Musical Fountain.

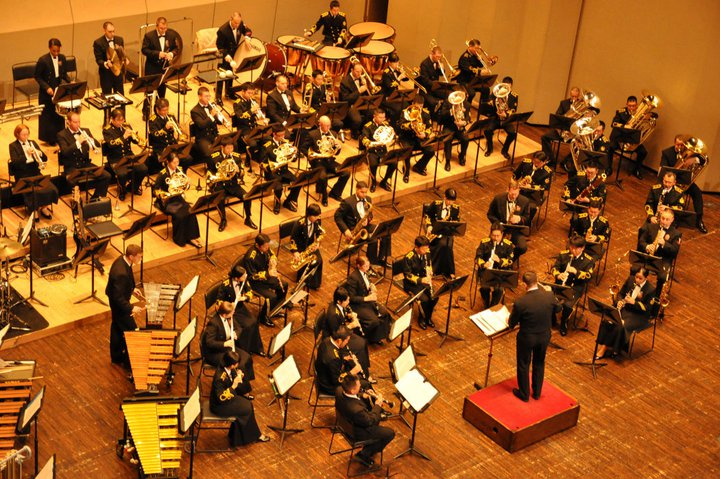
Members of the U.S. Navy Seventh Fleet Band perform alongside the Japan Maritime Self Defense Force Band.

== See also ==
- Pacific Fleet Band
- Royal Australian Navy Band
- Royal New Zealand Navy Band
