= USS Luzerne County =

U.S. Naval ship built during World War II

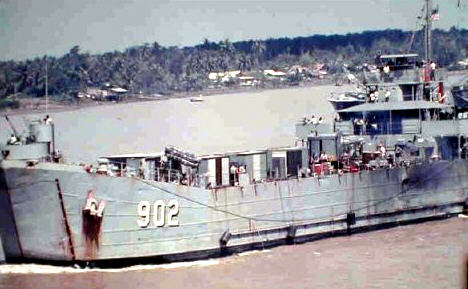
- USS Luzerne County (LST-902) underway on the Mekong River, Vietnam, 1968

History

United States
- Name: USS LST-902
- Builder: Dravo Corporation, Pittsburgh
- Laid down: 5 November 1944
- Launched: 16 December 1944
- Commissioned: 15 January 1945
- Decommissioned: 3 August 1946
- Recommissioned: 18 January 1952
- Decommissioned: 30 November 1955
- Renamed: USS Luzerne County (LST-902), 1 July 1955
- Recommissioned: 15 April 1963
- Decommissioned: 12 August 1970
- Stricken: 12 August 1970
- Honors and awards: 2 battle stars (Korea); 10 campaign stars (Vietnam)
- Fate: Barge in Mexico
- Notes: Everything above her deck like her bridge have been removed in Mexico, 2007.

General characteristics
- Class & type: LST-542-class tank landing ship
- Displacement: 1,625 long tons (1,651 t) light; 4,080 long tons (4,145 t) full
- Length: 328 ft (100 m)
- Beam: 50 ft (15 m)
- Draft: Unloaded : 2 ft 4 in (0.71 m) forward; 7 ft 6 in (2.29 m) aft; Loaded : 8 ft 2 in (2.49 m) forward; 14 ft 1 in (4.29 m) aft
- Propulsion: 2 × General Motors 12-567 diesel engines, two shafts, twin rudders
- Speed: 12 knots (22 km/h; 14 mph)
- Boats & landing craft carried: 2 × LCVPs
- Troops: Approximately 130 officers and enlisted men
- Complement: 8–10 officers, 89–100 enlisted men
- Armament: 8 × 40 mm guns; 12 × 20 mm guns

USS Luzerne County (LST-902) was an LST-542-class tank landing ship built for the United States Navy during World War II. Named after Luzerne County, Pennsylvania, she was the only U.S. Naval vessel to bear the name.

Originally laid down as LST-902 by the Dravo Corporation of Pittsburgh, Pennsylvania on 5 November 1944; the ship was launched on 16 December 1944, sponsored by Mrs. Michael Grom; and commissioned at Algiers, Louisiana on 15 January 1945.

== World War II ==
After shakedown off the Florida coast, LST-902 departed New Orleans on 16 February for the Pacific. She reached San Pedro, Los Angeles, on 13 March; thence, steaming via San Francisco, she arrived Maui, Hawaiian Islands on 31 March. She participated in amphibious training during the next two months. After embarking troops and loading cargo, she cleared Pearl Harbor on 18 June for the western Pacific. LST-902 touched at Eniwetok and Saipan before arriving Okinawa on 28 July as part of a 70-ship convoy. She discharged troops and cargo and on 5 August departed for Saipan where she remained until following the Japanese surrender.

She sailed to the Philippines early in September and during the rest of the month operated in Leyte Gulf and along the western coast of Luzon. Departing Subic Bay on 4 October, she carried occupation troops to Japan where she arrived at Yokohama on 17 October. Between 28 October and 4 November LST-902 steamed to Guam where she embarked 603 war veterans before sailing for the United States. She touched at Pearl Harbor on 27 November, and arrived San Diego on 14 December. After sailing to San Francisco the 19th, she underwent a three-month overhaul before sailing for the Columbia River on 25 April 1946. During the next three months she based at Astoria and Portland, Oregon and at Vancouver, Washington. She decommissioned at Portland on 3 August 1946 and entered the Pacific Reserve Fleet.

== Korean War ==
LST-902 recommissioned at Astoria on 18 January 1952. After completing shakedown and training operations along the Pacific coast, she departed San Diego for the Far East on 31 July. Steaming via Pearl Harbor and Midway, she reached Yokosuka, Japan, on 15 September and began supply runs in support of American naval and military operations in Korea. She operated along the Japanese coast and between Japanese and South Korean ports to bolster the movement of men and supplies to the war-torn peninsula.

Departing Yokosuka on 27 April 1953, LST-902 steamed via Pearl Harbor to the west coast where she arrived San Diego on 23 May. Between 31 July and 25 August she carried elements of the 3rd Marine Division to Japan; and, after returning to San Diego on 2 October, underwent overhaul at Alameda the remainder of the year.

LST-902 departed San Diego on 27 March 1954 to resume duty in the Far East. She arrived Yokosuka on 26 April and over the next five months operated on supply and training runs out of Yokosuka to Okinawa, South Korea, and Japanese coastal ports. On 8 October she sailed for French Indochina where she arrived Hai Phong on 17 October to support the French withdrawal and "Operation Passage to Freedom" from North Vietnam. Between 21 October and 11 November she completed four runs out of Hai Phong, carrying French troops and equipment to Da Nang and Saigon. After steaming to the Philippines in mid-November, she departed Subic Bay for Japan on 5 December and reached Yokosuka via Hong Kong the 22nd.

The veteran LST cleared Tokyo Bay on 17 January 1955. After arriving San Diego on 13 February, she operated along the Pacific coast during the next four months, and from 24 to 30 June she steamed to Seattle, Washington. Named USS Luzerne County (LST-902) on 1 July, she underwent deactivation overhaul; and, after sailing to Astoria, Oregon, on 29 August, she decommissioned there on 30 November to rejoin the Pacific Reserve Fleet.

== Dominican Republic ==
Luzerne County recommissioned in reserve at Stockton, California on 29 March 1963 for activation prior to service with the Atlantic Fleet. She joined the active list on 15 April and, following shakedown and type training out of San Diego, she departed for the east coast on 24 May and reached Little Creek, Virginia on 19 June. Assigned to ResLSTRon 2, Luzerne County trained Naval Reserve units out of Little Creek during the rest of 1963 and throughout 1964. This important duty sent the LST on training and readiness cruises along the Atlantic coast from Long Island Sound to the Straits of Florida.

After completing a run to Florida waters and back early in 1965, she joined naval forces operating to stabilize a crisis in the Dominican Republic. On 10 May Luzerne County steamed to Norfolk where she embarked troops and loaded equipment for shipment to the Dominican Republic. Departing 12 May, she reached Puerto de Andres on 19 May and debarked units of peacekeeping force. She returned to Little Creek, on 26 May. During the remainder of the year she made numerous runs between the United States and the Dominican Republic, shuttling troops, support equipment, and military cargo from Southport, North Carolina, to Santo Domingo and to San Juan, Puerto Rico. She completed her final run from Santo Domingo to Southport on 14 December and reached Little Creek two days later.

== Vietnam War ==
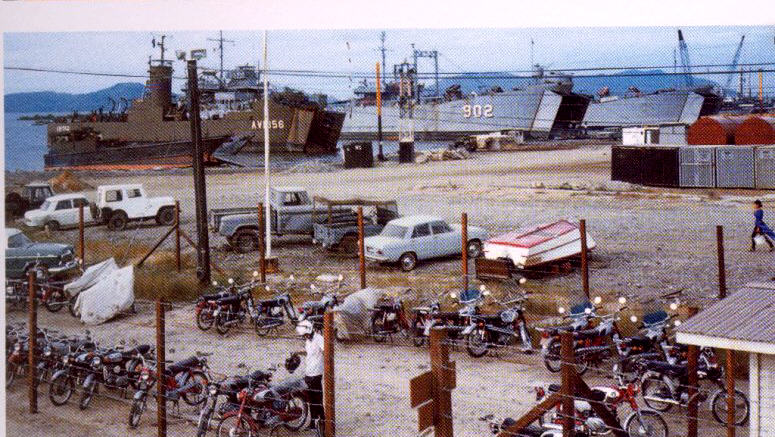
The ex-LSM-547 in Australian service as AV1356 Clive Steele with USS Luzerne County (LST-902) and an unidentified LST beached at a ramp in South Vietnam, c. 1969.

Late in December Luzerne County was assigned to duty in the Pacific in support of naval operations in Southeast Asia. Departing Norfolk on 19 January 1966, she loaded an LCU at Charleston; transited the Panama Canal on 1 February; touched at Pearl Harbor and Subic Bay; and arrived Saigon on 21 April. There she offloaded the LCU before steaming to Da Nang the next day. During the next two weeks she operated in the South China Sea and took part in freeing SS Excellency, an American merchant freighter, from a reef on Triton Island in the Paracels. Although damaged during salvage operations, Luzerne County carried the merchantman's cargo of ammunition to Bangkok, Thailand, where she arrived on 16 May; thence, she steamed to Sasebo, Japan for repairs and overhaul. Departing Sasebo on 2 July, Luzerne County resumed supply runs to South Vietnamese ports in support of the American war effort. During July, August, and September she carried military stores from Okinawa to Nhà Bè, Vũng Tàu, and Nha Trang, and during the next two months she hauled cement from Kaohsiung, Taiwan to Phan Rang. After departing Cam Ranh Bay on 26 November, she returned to Sasebo via Okinawa on 13 December.

She returned to South Vietnam early in 1967, and during February, March, and April she shuttled cargo to South Vietnamese ports. She operated out of Sasebo during much of May, but on 4 June she returned to Da Nang. While at Da Nang, she was ordered to Triton Island to aid an American merchantman that had grounded on the islands surrounding reef. While working alongside, Luzerne County was damaged when a sudden swell caused the ships to roll together. As soon as possible, she sailed for Sasebo to undergo repairs. Upon completion of repairs, she spent the remainder of the year hauling supplies to Vietnam from Taiwan and Okinawa. Excluding periods of upkeep and refresher training, Luzerne County remained in this capacity until 1969.

During the first part of 1970, Luzerne County was part of Landing Ship Squadron 2 (LANSHIPRON2) which in turn was part of the Mobile Riverine Force. Operating out of Vũng Tàu, her mission was "Armed Logistic Support" where she was utilized to resupply U.S. Army bases in the Mekong Delta. She had her last combat incident in April 1970, where she went to general quarters in response to hostile fire in the vicinity of Đồng Tâm Base Camp. This incident resulted in injury to one member of the crew. Later she went to Bangkok, Thailand before returning for one last mission in Vietnam.

Luzerne County departed the Mekong Delta for Da Nang at the end of April 1970 along with the other three ships of LANSHIPRON2, the USS Monmouth County, USS Iredell County (LST-839) and USS Clarke County. All four ships then began a six-week voyage from Da Nang to Guam, Pearl Harbor, San Diego and finally to the mothball fleet in Vallejo after which they were removed from active service.

Decommissioned (date unknown), she was struck from the Naval Vessel Register on 12 August 1970.

She was spotted in North Eastern Pennsylvania in 2006 by locals. She was also spotted in San Diego near Ensenada, Mexico area. All of the things above the ship's deck has been stripped and removed in Mexico as of 2007.

Her original 75-year-old bell now sits outside the front entrance of Building 15, Marine Corps Logistics Base Barstow, Barstow, California where it has been there for past 20 years.

== Awards ==
- Combat Action Ribbon
- Navy Meritorious Unit Commendation with 2 awards
- American Campaign Medal
- Asiatic-Pacific Campaign Medal
- World War 2 Victory Medal
- Navy Occupation Service Medal with "Asia" clasp
- National Defense Service Medal with 2 awards
- Korean Service Medal with 2 awards
- Armed Forces Expeditionary Medal
- Vietnam Service Medal with 10 awards
- Republic of Vietnam Gallantry Cross Unit Citation with 7 awards
- United Nation Service Medal
- Republic of Vietnam Campaign Medal
- Republic of Korea War Service Medal (retroactive)
