= Anthony A. Mitchell =

American musician and conductor (1917–2009)

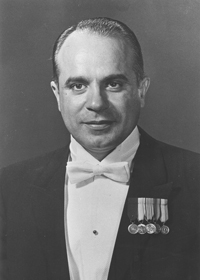

Background information
- Born: Antonio Alberto Miceli; August 26, 1917; Clearfield, Pennsylvania, US
- Died: January 20, 2009 (aged 91)
- Occupations: Conductor, composer, clarinetist
- Instrument: Clarinet

Anthony A. Mitchell (August 26, 1918 – January 20, 2009), born Antonio Alberto Miceli, was an American clarinetist, composer and conductor who led the United States Navy Band from 1962 until his retirement from the Navy in 1968. He was a prolific composer of marches, including "Our Nation's Capital", the official march of Washington, D.C.

== Early life ==
Mitchell was born on 26 August 1917 in Clearfield, Pennsylvania, the eldest of twelve children. His parents were Sicilian immigrants who changed the family name to Mitchell a year after his birth. Mitchell began playing the saxophone at age five and soon added the clarinet. His first teacher was his father, who had encouraged his interest in music. Although a painter and decorator by trade, his father was a skilled musician and the leader of the Clearfield town band. In 1936 the nineteen-year-old Mitchell enlisted in the US Navy and moved to Washington D.C. to study at the newly established Navy School of Music. After graduating with honors two years later, he was accepted into the US Navy Band as a clarinetist. In 1945 he became the clarinet soloist for the band, and the following year graduated from The Catholic University of America with a Bachelor of Music degree.

== Crash ==
Early on in his career with the Navy Band, Mitchell became their dance band's leader (then a separate unit) and moved into conducting. For some time after World War II, he also was the conductor and musical director of a weekly television broadcast featuring leading artists of the day. By 1956, he had risen to the rank of Warrant Officer, was promoted to Third Leader, and began conducting the Navy Band on many of its national tours. In early 1960 Mitchell and band were on a Presidential tour of South America dubbed "Operation Amigo" when on 25 February the band experienced its worst tragedy. 19 members of the band's string section, including its assistant director, were traveling on a Navy R6D transport plane en route to Rio de Janeiro, Brazil for a presidential reception between Brazilian President Juscelino Kubitschek and U.S. President Dwight D. Eisenhower when the plane collided on final approach with a Brazilian airliner over Guanabara bay. The crash killed all 19 members of the band including Lt. Johann Harold Fultz, the assistant director. Mitchell was originally supposed to be on board that aircraft, but was spared when Lt. Fultz said, 'Mitch, I don't need you tomorrow. Why don't you stay here?' Following the crash the band was ordered to continue their tour without change. The band members were devastated by the loss, and many quit upon returning to the States. The Band's leader of 20 years, Cdr. Charles Brendler, retired from the Navy in 1962. Mitchell was his personal choice to replace him. On the day Mitchell assumed his post (February 26, 1962), he led the US Navy band in Washington's official welcome to astronaut John Glenn.

== Band leader ==
In 1963 the Navy Band under Lt. Anthony "Mitch" Mitchell's leadership recorded The National Cultural Center Presents the United States Navy Band for RCA Victor. The LP was the Navy's contribution to a unique four album set featuring each military branch band—the first time the bands had released their recordings commercially. Organized by the Department of Defense, the special release was to raise funds for the National Cultural Center in Washington D.C. (renamed the John F. Kennedy Center for the Performing Arts in 1964). In June 1963, the Navy Band's album entered the Billboard Top 40 album chart. It was re-released on CD in 2009.

During his time as Band Leader, Mitchell conducted the Navy Band's daily performances on the east steps of the U.S. Capitol, as well as their weekly Monday night concerts at the Capital. Mitchell led the band on national tours, including its first ever performance at New York City's Carnegie Hall in 1966. He also founded an annual Washington Area Soloist Festival for young musicians, and introduced a series of children's concerts. For his initiatives to bring music to young people, he received an honorary Doctor of Music Degree from Saint Francis University. His numerous compositions included "Our Nation's Capital", the official march of the District of Columbia, and the "National Cultural Center March" (later renamed the "John F. Kennedy Center for the Performing Arts March") which was played during fund-raising events for the center and later at its inauguration.

== Retirement ==
Mitchell retired from the navy on December 30, 1968, with the rank of lieutenant commander. After his retirement, he worked as a music teacher in a junior high school in Maryland as well as serving as a music education adviser and music competition judge. He celebrated 63 years of marriage with his wife, Helen Rittenhouse Mitchell, before she died at age 87 in the spring of 2005. Mitchell died at the age of 91 on January 20, 2009, of complications from lupus. He was survived by his five children and ten of his brothers and sisters. One of his younger brothers had also played for the Navy Band (as a trumpeter and singer), and another was for many years the clarinet soloist for the US Air Force Band.

== Discography ==
| Title | Orchestra | Year | Record label |
|---|---|---|---|
| The National Culture Center Presents The United States Navy Band | United States Navy Band | 1963 | RCA Victor LSP 2688 |
| Three Hit Albums from the United States Military Bands | United States Navy Band, United States Marine Corps Band, United States Air Force Band | 2009 (reissue on CD of the 1963 RCA Victor set) | Collector's Choice |
