= Shannon Roberts =

Shannon B. Roberts is a nationally known composer, arranger, author, clinician, and music educator. Originally from Vista, California, he has been residing in the Salt Lake area for the last 15 years. He holds Ph.D. and Master of Music degrees in music composition from the University of Utah; a Bachelor of Arts degree in psychology from the United States International University in San Diego, California; an Associate of Arts degree in applied arts from San Diego Mesa College; and is a graduate of the United States Navy School of Music in Little Creek, Virginia.

Roberts is a regular performer with the Salt Lake City Jazz Orchestra and the Great Basin St. Band. He is the musical director for the Spare Parts Big Band and also performs with his own jazz trio, quintet, and 8-piece band. As a brass specialist on trumpet, trombone and tuba; he has played with many national artists like Eddie Daniels, Frank Sinatra Jr., Dee Daniels, Spanky Wilson, Jeff Hamilton, Maureen McGovern, and the Manhattan Transfer. Before moving to Utah to pursue doctoral studies, Dr. Roberts was the musical director for Sea World of San Diego and a local studio musician and arranger. He is the former assistant Director of Bands at the University of Utah and was the Director of Jazz Ensemble One for ten years. Dr. Roberts taught high school and community college at several Southern California schools, was a Staff Arranger and Euphonium soloist with the United States Navy Band in San Diego, and played Euphonium for the Disneyland Circus Band. He was the Director of Bands at Woods Cross High School in Woods Cross, Utah, for seven years, and was one of the substitute conductors for the Utah Youth Symphony.
