= Navy B1 Band =

The United Navy B-1 Band helped integrate the modern Navy by the first African American sailors to serve at a rank higher than Messman.

Comprising the most talented African American students and graduates primarily from North Carolina A&T College, 44 band members enlisted June 1, 1942. James B. Parsons was selected as the director of the band. After first being sent to Norfolk, Virginia for basic training, the band was sent to the Navy Pre-Flight School established on the campus of the University of North Carolina at Chapel Hill. At the School, their band was initially given the name The Cloudbusters. Due to ongoing segregation, the B-1 Band was excluded from housing on the campus, which did offer residence to one of the Naval Pre-Flight Schools at the time.

Stationed in Chapel Hill at the community center between the years of 1942 and 1944 until they were transferred to Manana Barracks at Pearl Harbor, Hawaii. Despite the Navy slowly beginning to integrate, band members experienced segregationist practices such as being unable to attend the Navy's School of Music, unlike other Navy Band musicians. The band was stationed in Hawaii from 1944 until the end of the war. During that time, some members of the band performed locally in a swing band known as The Moonglowers and in another band called the Manna Ridge Band.

After the war, most of the band members returned to North Carolina A&T to finish their degrees. A significant number of the band members to entered the field of education as teachers or band directors, including Calvin F. Morrow, Musician 2nd Class, who became a high school principal following his service. After his quality tenure as band director, James B. Parsons was appointed as the first African American to serve in the U.S. District Court system as a federal judge by then-president John F. Kennedy in 1961.

Many of the band members remained in the Greensboro community with several members forming the Rhythm Vets band. The band gained enough popularity that they were asked to perform the sound track for the 1948 Black-cast musical comedy featurette Pitch a Boogie Woogie. This film, shot in Greenville, North Carolina, has been preserved and is included in the 1988 documentary Boogie in Black and White.

== See also ==
- Military history of African Americans
- United States Navy Band
