= Full spectrum diplomacy =

Integration of governmental and public diplomacy

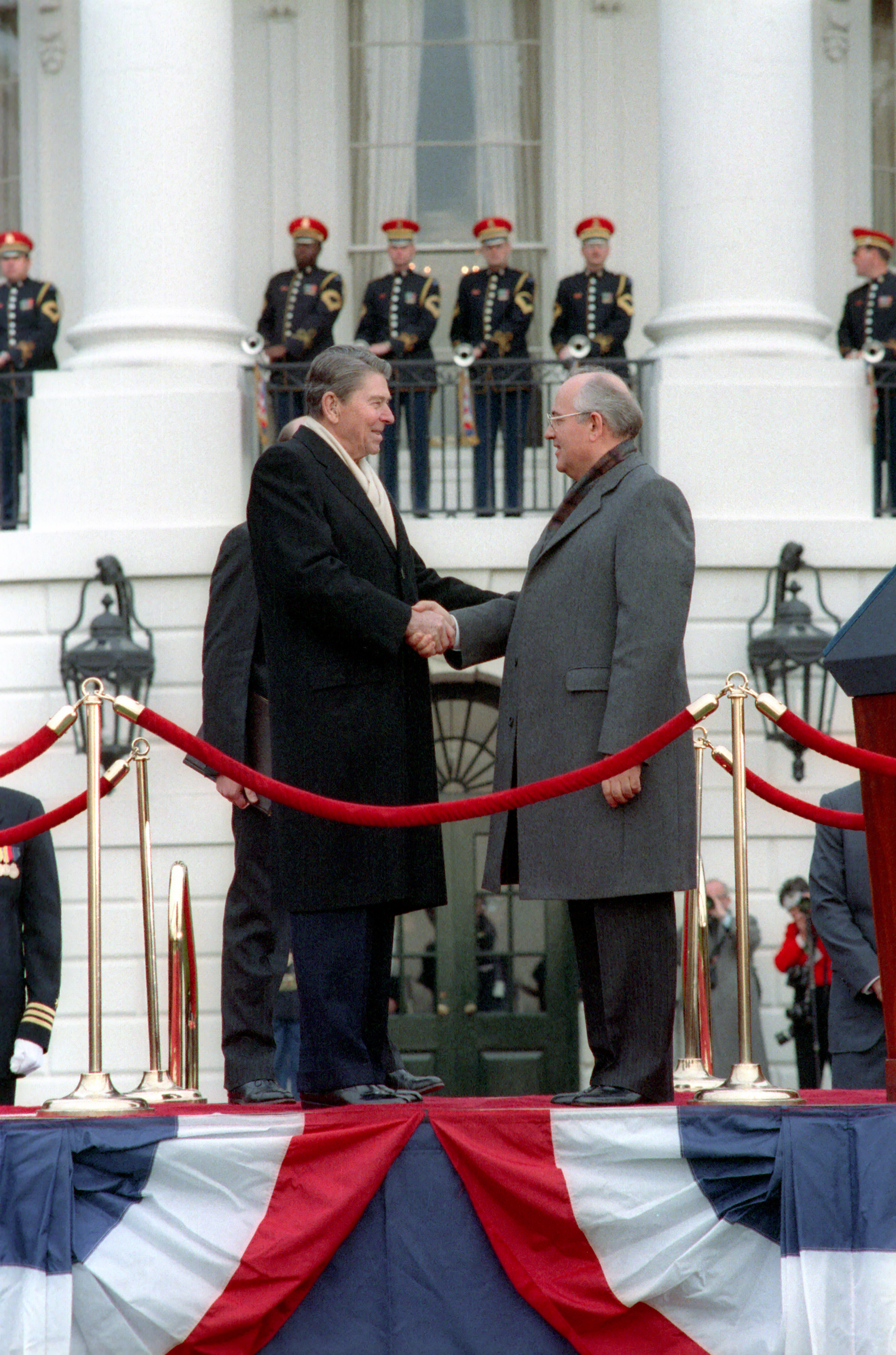
Reagan and Gorbachev at a State Arrival Ceremony, 1987

Full spectrum diplomacy is a combination of traditional, government-to-government diplomacy with the many components of public diplomacy as well as the integration of these two functions with other instruments of statecraft. John Lenczowski, founder and president of The Institute of World Politics in Washington, D.C., coined the term in his May 2011 book Full Spectrum Diplomacy and Grand Strategy: Reforming the Structure and Culture of U.S. Foreign Policy.

== Origin ==
Lenczowski's book appears to be the first attempt to define the term. In it, he references the military concept of "full spectrum operations" (or "full spectrum dominance") indicating that it inspired his derivation for diplomatic use. He writes that the diplomatic community does not have a comparable term to full spectrum operations, "but there should be, in order to end the systematic neglect of some dimensions of the larger art of diplomacy."

In a chapter of the Routledge Handbook of Public Diplomacy, Matthew Armstrong provides a historical perspective on the use of full spectrum diplomatic action:

In 1948, George Kennan developed a plan for “organized political warfare” to counter the Soviet Union’s growing power and influence. To be effective, it required the United States to employ all means possible to achieve its national objective, including overt activities such as political alliances, economic measures, and “white” propaganda, to covert operations such as clandestine support of foreign elements, “black” psychological warfare, to encouraging underground resistance movements in hostile states. This was not the “diplomacy in public” we know today, but a full-spectrum “diplomacy with publics” that engaged people at all levels and with all means available. Seven years later, Nelson Rockefeller recognized the struggle as “shifting more than ever from the arena of power to the arena of ideas and international persuasion.” A then-young Henry Kissinger, stressing the importance of the people, noted the “predominant aspect of the new diplomacy is its psychological dimension.”

== Components ==
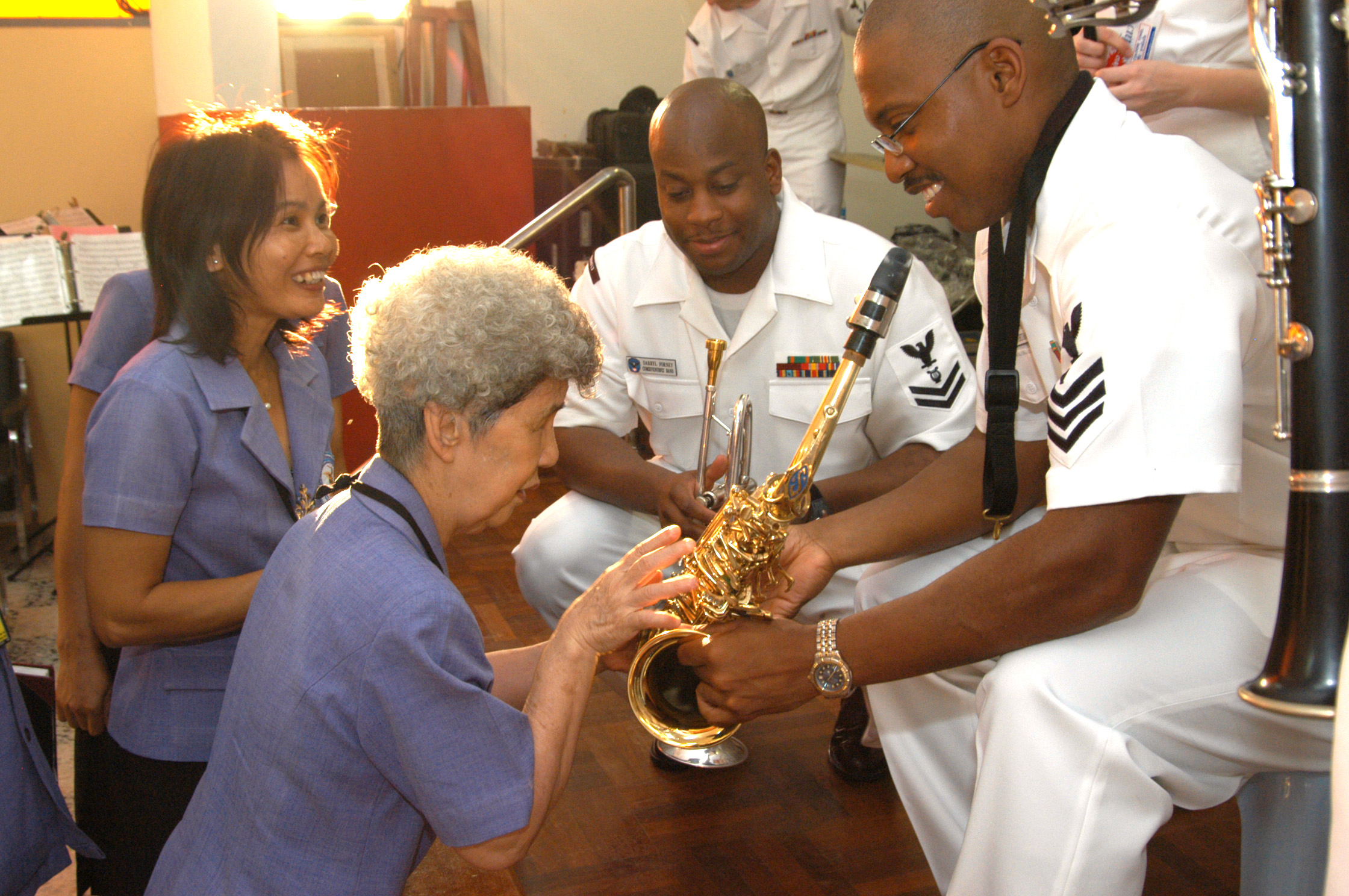
Members of the Seventh Fleet Band engaging in cultural diplomacy at the Pattaya Redemptorist School for the Blind

Full spectrum diplomacy is an integrated strategy that encompasses all instruments of engagement including traditional diplomacy and public diplomacy. Of particular note is advocacy for the use of cultural diplomacy to enhance contact with people at the grassroots level.

To increase the role of public diplomacy, Lenczowski advocates the foundation of a U.S. Public Diplomacy Agency. This would not only take the place of the former United States Information Agency (USIA), but would expand to coordinate all aspects of the public diplomacy instrument. Juliana Pilon advocates a similar organization in her book Why America is Such a Hard Sell in which she promotes an "American Global Outreach and Research Agency." Her idea culminates in a system that links the instruments of public diplomacy throughout the whole of government. Yet another proposal is that of Professor Carnes Lord of the Naval War College writing for the creation of a "Policy Coordinating Committee on Foreign Information, Assistance, and Democracy Promotion" that would serve to integrate the leadership of the many organizations involved in public diplomacy to other agencies of strategic influence.

Lenczowski provides further explanation of the construct here:

Thus, a full realization of the possibilities of public diplomacy must take into account the necessity of its proper integration with other arts of statecraft where, for example, military strategy incorporates public diplomacy into its calculations (e.g., in behavior toward foreign populations, the treatment of prisoners, etc.), or where the need to exert political influence requires the collection of “opportunities intelligence” on targets of potential political influence, or the use of offensive political counterintelligence operations. It is the entire range of these public diplomatic instruments combined with traditional diplomacy, and finally integrated with the other arts of statecraft that comprise what is missing in U.S. foreign policy: full spectrum diplomacy.

== Orchestra analogy ==
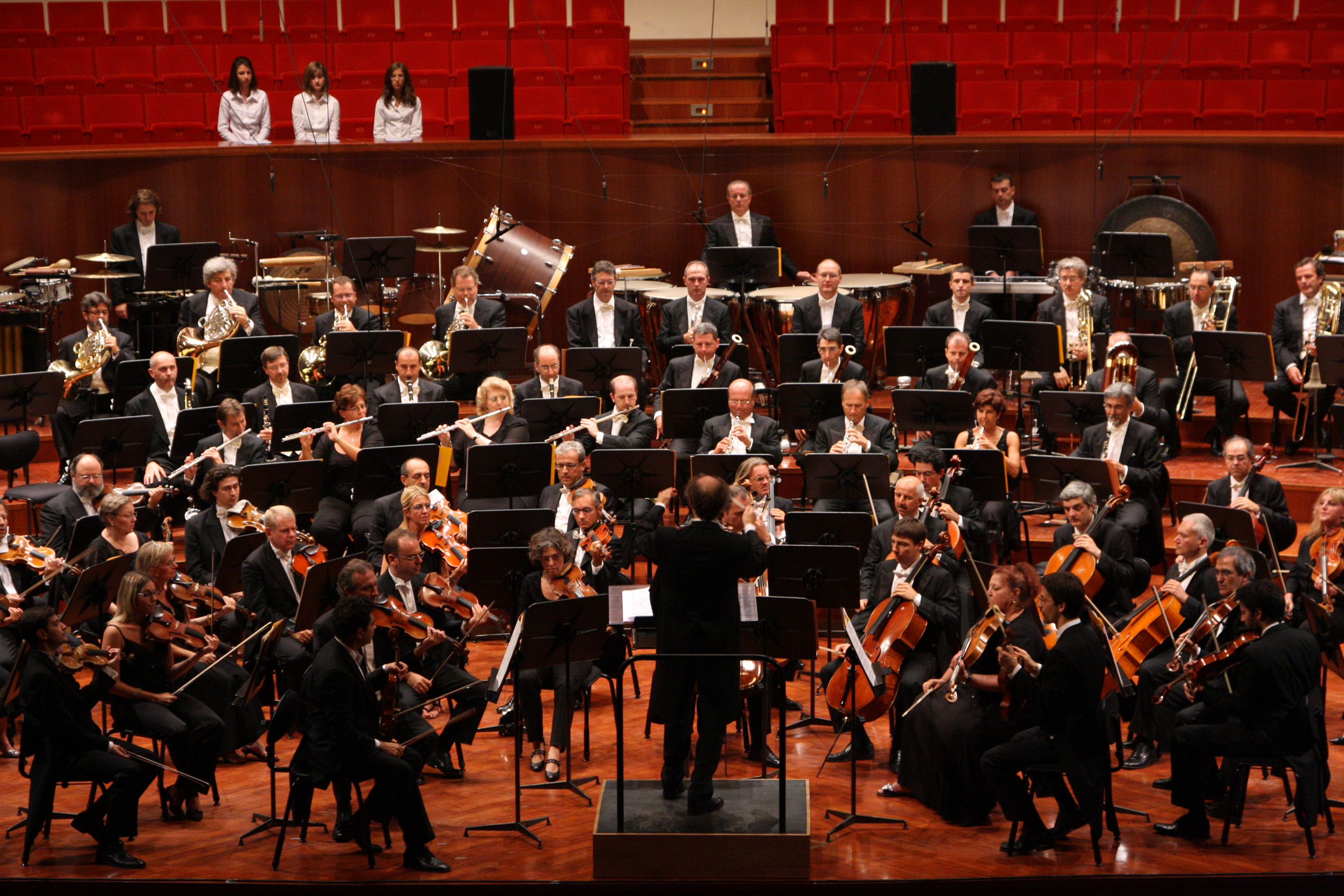
MITO Orchestra Sinfonica RAI

In support of the concept of full spectrum diplomacy, Lenczowski writes that "the achievement of foreign policy goals requires a multiplicity of means that can be likened to instruments in an orchestra." Additionally, he states that "the conduct of full spectrum diplomacy thus involves the proper orchestration of both traditional and public diplomacy in such a fashion that the policies governing each function do not jeopardize the effectiveness of the other."

This collected orchestration becomes a part of what Lenczowski calls an “integrated strategy” defined by "a concept that requires the coordination of all the instruments of statecraft, including military policy, intelligence, counterintelligence, economic policy, etc."

A previous use of this musical ensemble analogy for an instrument of statecraft is found in a World War II Soviet anti-Nazi espionage element commonly known as the Red Orchestra.

== Purpose ==
The purpose of full spectrum diplomacy is to promote what Lenczowski calls an "influence culture." This environment includes a more versatile diplomatic corps to accompany an increased focus on public diplomacy. It is a comprehensive approach that will employ many of the elements of what Harvard professor Joseph Nye calls soft power and what a number of scholars and government officials refer to as smart power. The influence culture and resulting integrated strategy of the "orchestra" allow for a broader international approach. In lieu of too quickly resorting to hard power such as military action, the engagement of full spectrum diplomacy provides for a variety of possible non-military actions that could pre-empt the need for armed conflict.

Scholars have been calling for this approach to American grand strategy for years. Paul Kennedy writes that the U.S. "needs to integrate its political, economic, and military aims in a coherent fashion, for years of peace as well as the possibility of war." In his book Soft Power, Joseph Nye asserts that "America's success will depend upon our developing a deeper understanding of the role of soft power and developing a better balance of hard and soft power in our foreign policy.". The resulting "smart power" provides a distinct tie-in to the idea of full spectrum diplomacy. Finally, Professor Colin S. Gray calls for a "fully functioning 'strategy bridge' that binds together, adaptably, the realms of policy and military behavior.".

== Use of the concept in academia and journalism ==
Though a relatively new term in the lexicon of statecraft, full spectrum diplomacy is already found in reference to contemporary events. In a February 28, 2011 commentary piece in the U.N. Dispatch, Mark Leon Goldberg references the term in the title: "The Obama Administration’s Full Spectrum Diplomacy on Libya." In defense of the Obama administration's strategy in the North African nation, he writes that: "After the unanimous passage of a strong Security Council resolution on Libya on Saturday, there appears to be a full spectrum diplomatic push led by the Obama administration to make sure that the provisions called for in the resolution are swiftly and effectively imposed."

Other references, which occur prior to Lenczowski's initial use of the term, utilize similar terminology or imply the same conceptual framework.

In March 2009 congressional testimony, George Moose, former U.S. Assistant Secretary of State for African Affairs, urged the development of a larger and more versatile diplomatic corps:

...the first and most urgent step required to restore balance in the conduct of our foreign policy is the rebuilding of the capacities of our civilian foreign affairs agencies. We can no longer pretend that State and USAID can responsibly assume the burgeoning list of diplomatic tasks central to protecting and advancing America's global interests without substantial increases in staff. This is true across the full spectrum of diplomatic activity, but it is especially true with respect to our response to situations of conflict and the threats they to our national security interests.

In a July 2006 article promoting 'full spectrum analysis' at the strategic level, Adrian Wolfberg, then director of the Knowledge Laboratory at the Defense Intelligence Agency, wrote that "the warfighter now operates along many lines at once and across a full spectrum of possible actions, either diplomatic, intelligence-driven, military, or economic in nature.

== See also ==
- Engagement (diplomacy)
- Hostage diplomacy
- Public diplomacy
- Public diplomacy of the United States
- Cultural diplomacy
- Soft power
- Hard power
- smart power
- Foreign policy
- Foreign policy of the United States
