= Ralph M. Gambone =

American conductor

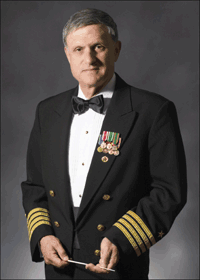
- Allegiance: United States
- Branch: United States Navy
- Service years: 1969–2007
- Rank: Captain

Ralph M. Gambone is a former United States Navy officer. He served as Leader/Officer in Charge of the U.S. Navy Band from August 13, 1998 to March 2007. Prior to that, he served as Director of the U.S. Naval Academy Band in Annapolis, Maryland.

== Career ==
A native of Annapolis, in 1963 Gambone received a one-semester scholarship to the Peabody Institute and soloed with the Naval Academy Band following a formal audition process. Gambone enlisted in the Navy in 1969 after receiving his bachelor's degree in music from Towson State College (Maryland). He was first assigned to the U.S. Naval Academy Band as a clarinet instrumentalist and also served as conductor of the Midshipman Stage and Concert Bands. While there he earned a master's degree in music from Catholic University in Washington, D.C.

After a tour of duty aboard the cruiser USS Little Rock (CLG 4), Gambone was assigned to the United States Navy Band in Washington, D.C. After three years with the Band and promotion to chief musician, he was assigned to the Bureau of Naval Personnel as Assistant Budget Manager for the Navy Music Program in 1978.

In 1981, he was commissioned an ensign and reported for duty as Music Program Liaison Officer for the Navy Chief of Information in The Pentagon.

After two years as Director, Navy Band San Diego, he was assigned as the United States Navy Band's Supply Officer in 1985, and a year later assumed the duties of the Band's Assistant Leader. From August 1988 to June 1990, he served as Director, SEVENTH Fleet Band, stationed on board the USS Blue Ridge (LCC 19) in Yokosuka, Japan, before returning to the United States Navy Band as Assistant Leader. His next assignment took him to the Armed Forces School of Music in Little Creek, Va., where he served first as Executive Officer from March to August 1994, then as Commanding Officer.

He was promoted to captain in October 2002, while serving as Director of the U.S. Navy Band.

== Awards and honors ==
The Distinguished Achievement Award in music from Towson State University, May 1991.

Inductee, American Bandmasters Association (ABA), April 2001
