= United States Navy Band =

Official musical organization of the US Navy

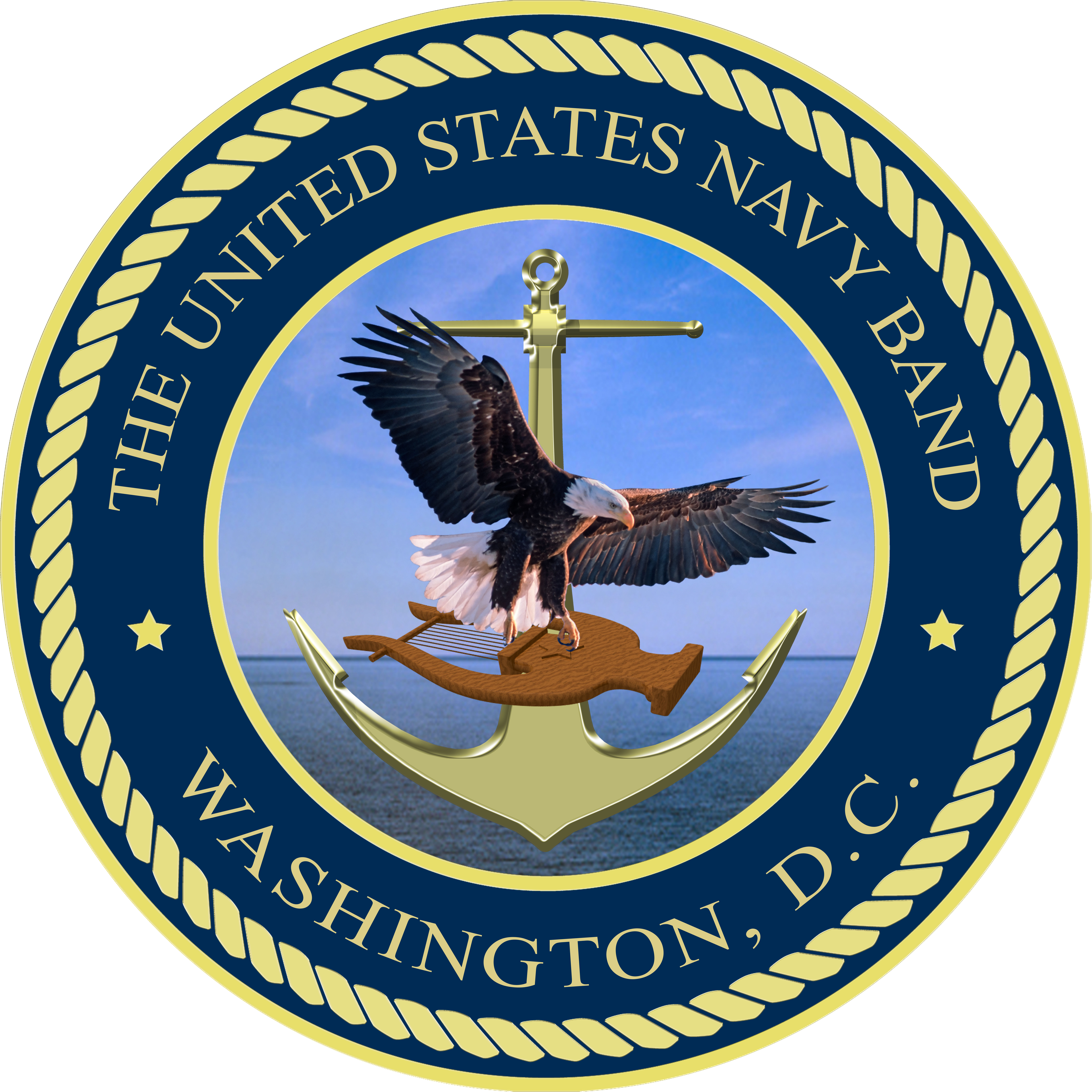
- Founded: 1925; 101 years ago
- Country: United States
- Branch: United States Navy
- Garrison/HQ: Washington Navy Yard
- Nickname: "The World's Finest"
- March: "Anchors Aweigh"
- Anniversaries: 4 March 1925
- Decorations: 6 Meritorious Unit Commendations
- Website: navyband.navy.mil

Commanders
- Commanding Officer/Leader: Capt. Robert Coats
- Executive Officer: Lt. Cmdr. Kelly Cartwright
- Senior Enlisted Advisor: MUCM James Armstrong III
- Concert/Ceremonial Department Head: Lt. J.G. David Drescher
- Specialty Groups Department Head: Lt. J.G. Antonio Garcia
- Staff Department Head: Ensign Kyle Beltram

Insignia
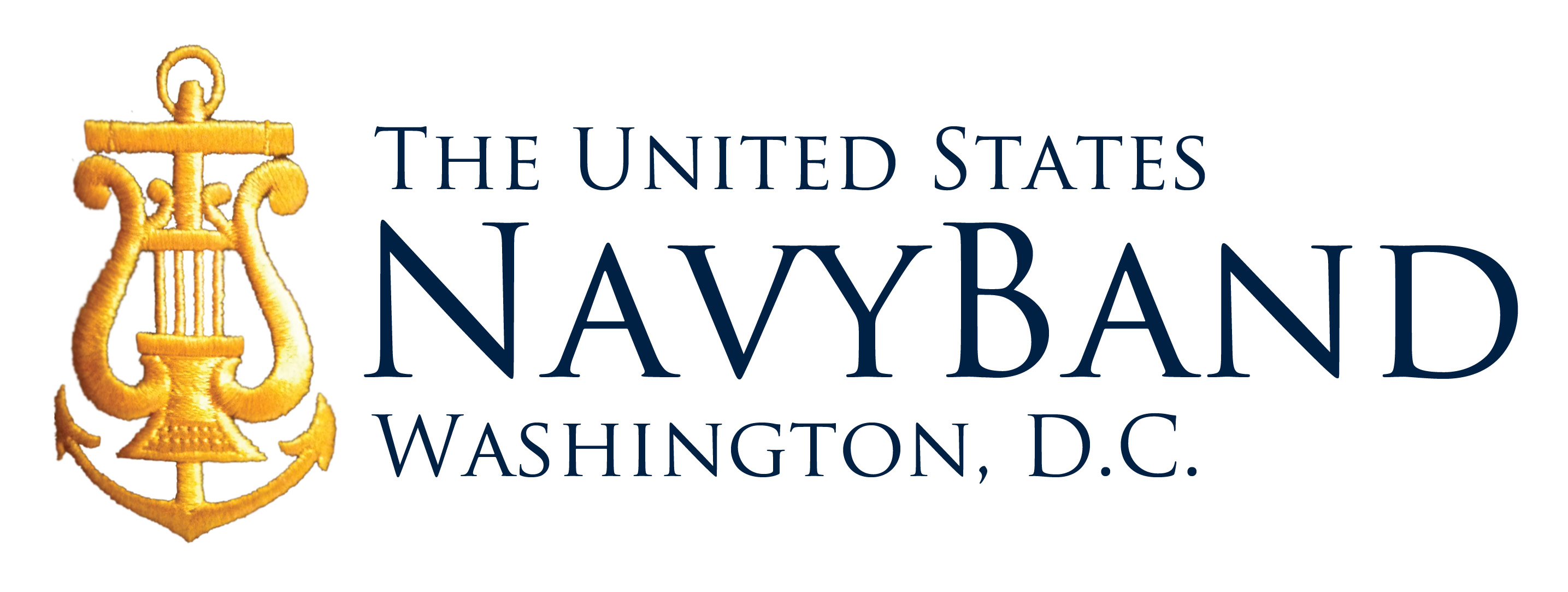
- Wordmark

The United States Navy Band, is based in the Washington Navy Yard in Washington, D.C. and is the official musical organization of the U.S. Navy since 1925. The U.S. Navy Band serves the ceremonial needs at the seat of U.S. government, performing at presidential inaugurations, state arrival ceremonies, state funerals, state dinners, and other significant events.

The band performs a broad range of music, including ceremonial ruffles and flourishes, classical, rock, jazz, and country.

== Organization and personnel ==
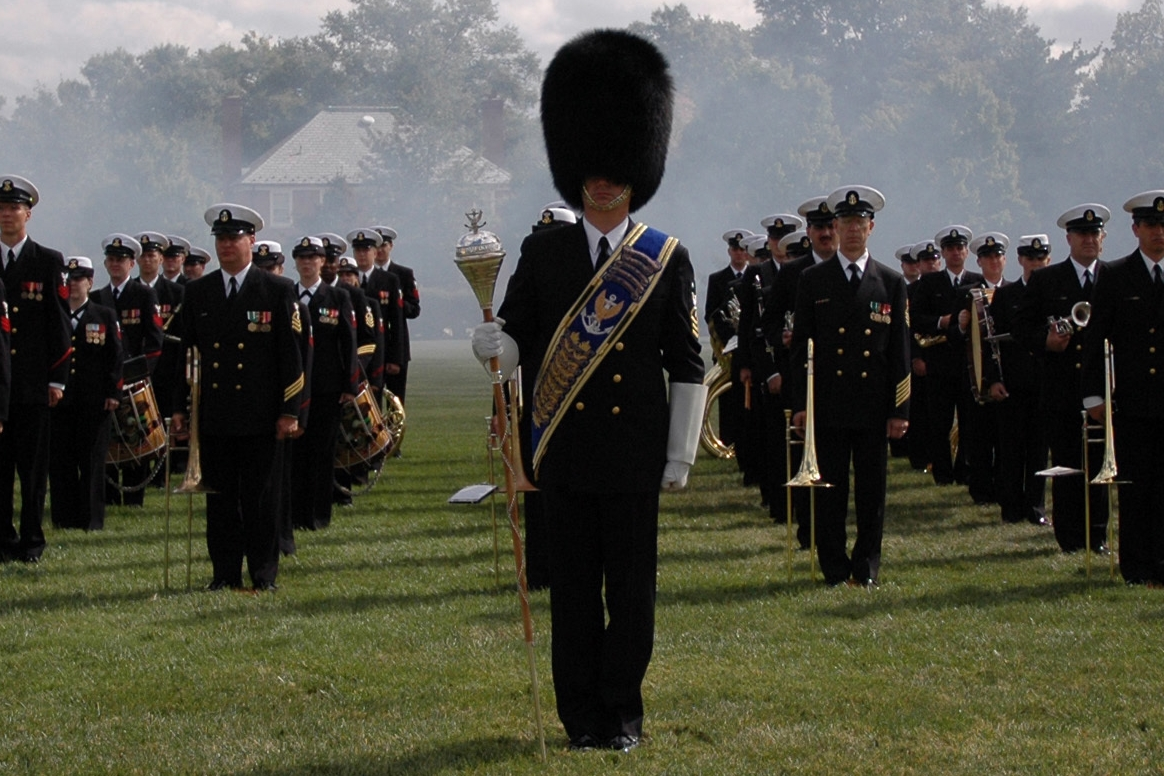
United States Navy Band members in 2007

Since its official designation in 1925, the United States Navy Band has grown into a diverse organization of multiple performing units. The organization features six performing ensembles: the Concert Band, the Ceremonial Band, the Commodores jazz ensemble, Country Current country-bluegrass ensemble, the Cruisers contemporary entertainment ensemble, and the Sea Chanters chorus. There are also several chamber music groups. The multiple ensembles help meet the public demand for different types of music and the needs of Navy recruiting.

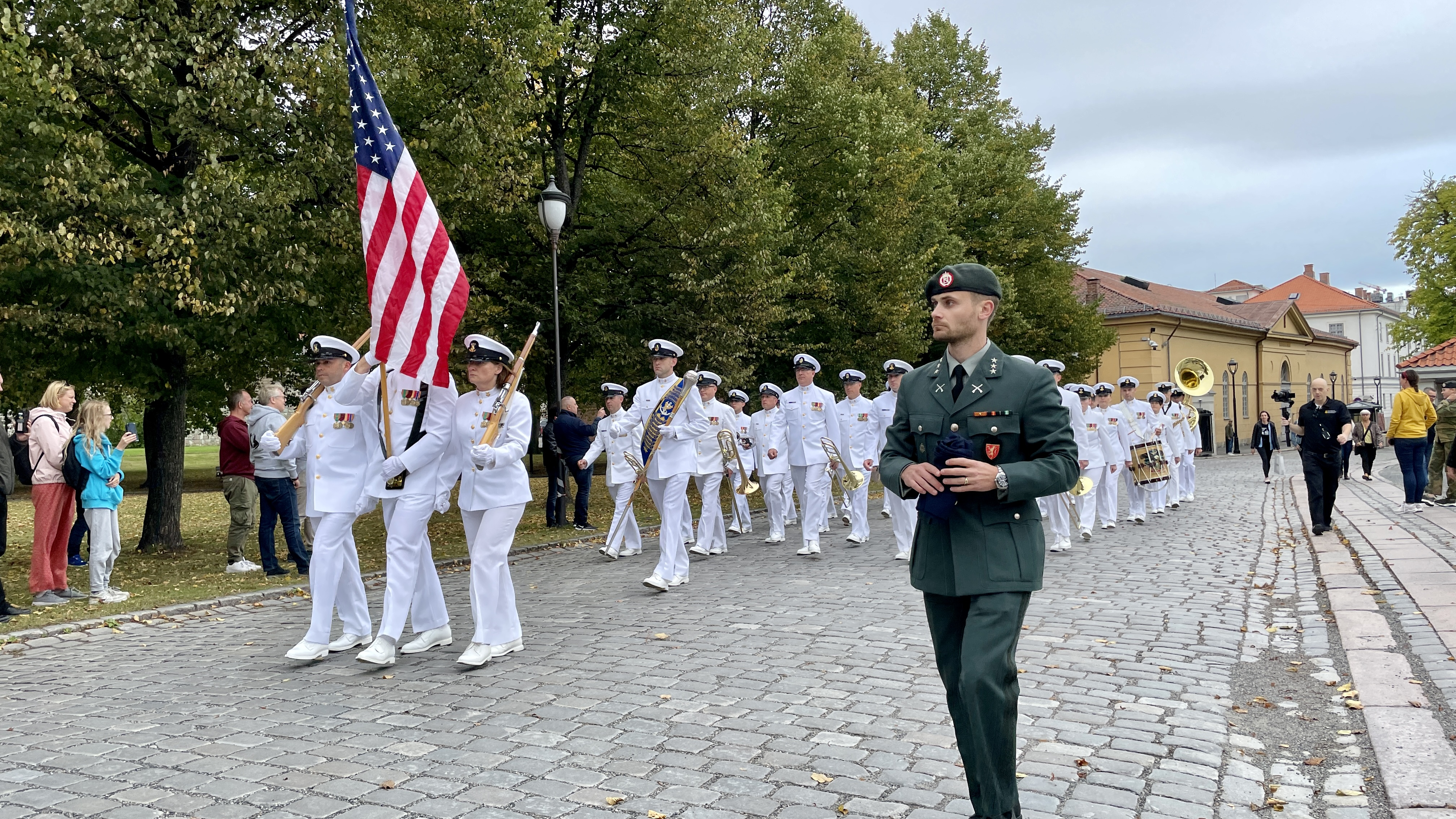
United States Navy Band playing in Oslo, 2022

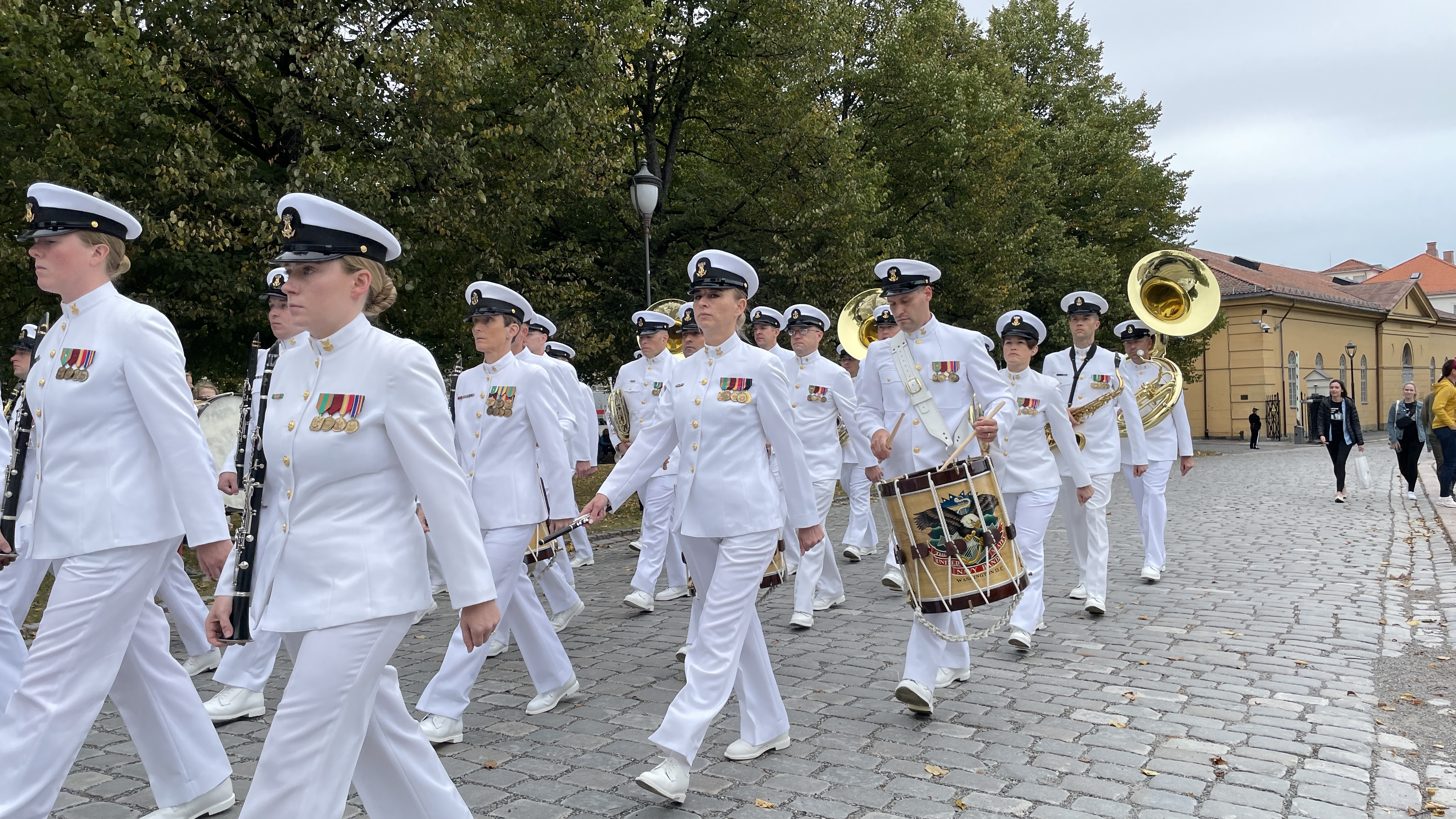
United States Navy Band playing in Oslo, 2022

The United States Navy Band is composed of 172 enlisted musicians and four officers, under the direction of Capt. Robert "Seph" Coats.

=== Concert Band ===
The Concert Band is the Navy's premier wind ensemble. Along with the Ceremonial Band, this band was part of the original Navy Band in 1925. The group plays concerts in the Washington, D.C. area and performs a month-long national tour each year.

=== Ceremonial Band ===
The Ceremonial Band performs ceremonies in and around the Washington, D.C. area. Their primary mission is performing for funerals at Arlington National Cemetery. Additionally, the Ceremonial Band performs at command changes, retirements, patriotic openers, wreath-layings, and arrivals.

=== Sea Chanters ===
In 1956, Lt. Harold Fultz, then the band's assistant leader, organized a Navy School of Music group to sing chanteys and patriotic songs for the State of the Nation dinner. An immediate success, ADM Arleigh Burke, then chief of naval operations, transferred them to the Navy Band, named them the Sea Chanters, and tasked this all-male chorus with perpetuating the songs of the sea. In 1980, the group added women to their ranks and expanded their repertoire to include everything from Brahms to Broadway.

=== Commodores ===
Founded in 1969, the Commodores are a jazz ensemble. Performers who have appeared with the group include Ray Charles, Stanley Turrentine, Louie Bellson, Terry Gibbs, Chris Potter, Jerry Bergonzi, Bob Mintzer, Dave Leibman, James Moody, and Clark Terry.

=== Country Current ===
This seven-member group was formed in 1973 and specialized in country and bluegrass music.

=== Cruisers ===
A contemporary entertainment ensemble with eight members was formed in 1999.

== History ==
=== Early music in the Navy ===
The earliest music of the United States Navy was the shantyman's song. These melodies of the sea helped soften the rigors of shipboard life. Next came trumpeters, drummers, and fifers who were carried on the early frigates to sound calls, give general orders, and perform at funerals and other ceremonies. Military bands became a separate section of the crew on many Navy vessels.

The development of shore-based bands in the 19th century led to the creation of the Naval Academy Band, which grew in size and importance during the American Civil War. Other band units afloat and ashore played a significant role in promoting sailors' and civilians' morale.

At the start of World War I, many musicians left their orchestras to join the United States Navy, using their talents to further the war effort.

=== Establishment of the U.S. Navy Band ===
In 1916, a 16-piece band from the battleship USS Kansas was ordered to the Washington Navy Yard to augment a 17-piece band aboard the Presidential Yacht Mayflower. The new unit became known as the "Washington Navy Yard Band" and was given rehearsal space near the power plant's coal pile. The increasing tempo of the band's duties led the bandmaster to seek more suitable quarters in the yard's "Sail Loft", and sailmakers were soon cutting and stitching their canvas to the rhythms of the music. The United States Navy Band still occupies the Sail Loft as its headquarters and rehearsal hall.

In 1923, a 35-man contingent from the Navy Yard Band accompanied President Warren G. Harding on his trip to the Alaska Territory. After the president's unexpected death in San Francisco, the band performed the hymn "Nearer My God to Thee" as his body was placed aboard a train destined for Washington, D.C.

With the band growing in importance and prestige, President Calvin Coolidge signed into law a 1925 bill stating "hereafter the band now stationed at the Navy Yard, known as the Navy Yard Band, shall be designated as the United States Navy Band." The legislation also allowed the band to take its first national tour in 1925.

Among those praising the early United States Navy Band was the Boston Post newspaper, which printed on 13 March 1929: "…Some folks have an idea perhaps that Navy music is made up of a few chantey choruses, a jig, and "The Star-Spangled Banner". To the average American Citizen the performance last night must have been a truly startling eye-opener. They performed like a company of first-rank virtuosi…"

Under the baton of Lt. Charles Benter, the band's first leader, the United States Navy Band was featured at many historic occasions, including the 1927 return of Charles Lindbergh following his trans-Atlantic flight. Two years later, the band performed for the return of Adm. Richard E. Byrd from his famous South Pole flight.

The need for qualified musicians led Lt. Benter to found the Navy School of Music under his charge in 1935. Many of the faculty were bandsmen who taught in addition to their performance duties.

Throughout much of the 1960s, the band's leader was Anthony A. Mitchell, a classical clarinetist and accomplished composer who had joined the band in 1937. During his tenure as the Band's director LCDR Mitchell composed the popular march Our Nation's Capital, later honored as the official march of Washington, D.C. He also wrote a march for the yet-unbuilt National Cultural Center in Washington, D.C. The National Cultural Center March was first performed and recorded by the band in 1963 and was performed at fundraising events for the Center throughout the early 1960s. In 1964 the center was renamed the Kennedy Center for the Performing Arts to honor the fallen president. The march's title was changed to the John F. Kennedy Center March in 1964, though it is still often referred to by its original title.

=== Crash ===
There was an aerial collision between two aircraft over Rio de Janeiro, Brazil on February 25, 1960 which carried members of the band.

=== Capitol concerts ===
Among the Navy Band's many accomplishments were weekly Monday night concerts, and smaller daily concerts held at the U.S. Capitol. Held on a special stage located on the east side of the Capitol, the daily and weekly concerts ran without interruption from the 1930s until the early 1970s. In the 1960s, the Navy Band began a series of popular children's performances, known as "Lollypop Concerts".

=== Past leaders of the Navy Band ===
	Leader	Years
1	LT Charles Benter	1925–1942
2	CDR Charles Brendler	1942–1962
3	LCDR Anthony A. Mitchell	1962–1968
4	CDR Donald W. Stauffer	1968–1973
5	CDR Ned Muffley	1973–1978
6	CDR William J. Phillips	1978–1984
7	CDR Allen E. Beck	1984–1989
8	CDR Phillip H. Field	1989–1992
9	CAPT William J. Phillips	1992–1995
10	LCDR John R. Pastin	1995–1998
11	CAPT Ralph M. Gambone	1998–2007
12	CAPT George N. Thompson	2007–2009
13	CAPT Brian O. Walden	2010–2015
14	CAPT Kenneth Collins	2015–2024
15	CDR Robert Coats	2024–

=== Radio performances ===
From 1929 to 1939, the United States Navy Band took to the airwaves with Arthur Godfrey on NBC's "Hour of Memories" radio program. During World War II, the United States Navy Band supported the sale of war bonds. It assisted in national recruiting efforts, although most of the band's time was spent performing at the daily funerals at Arlington National Cemetery.

At the close of the war in 1945, the radio program "The Navy Hour" was born. It featured such entertainers as Lt. Robert Taylor and Lt.(j.g.) Gene Kelly, with whom the band had appeared in the film Anchors Aweigh. When it went off the air in 1968, "The Navy Hour" had set a record for one of the longest tenures in radio.

=== Other notable performances ===
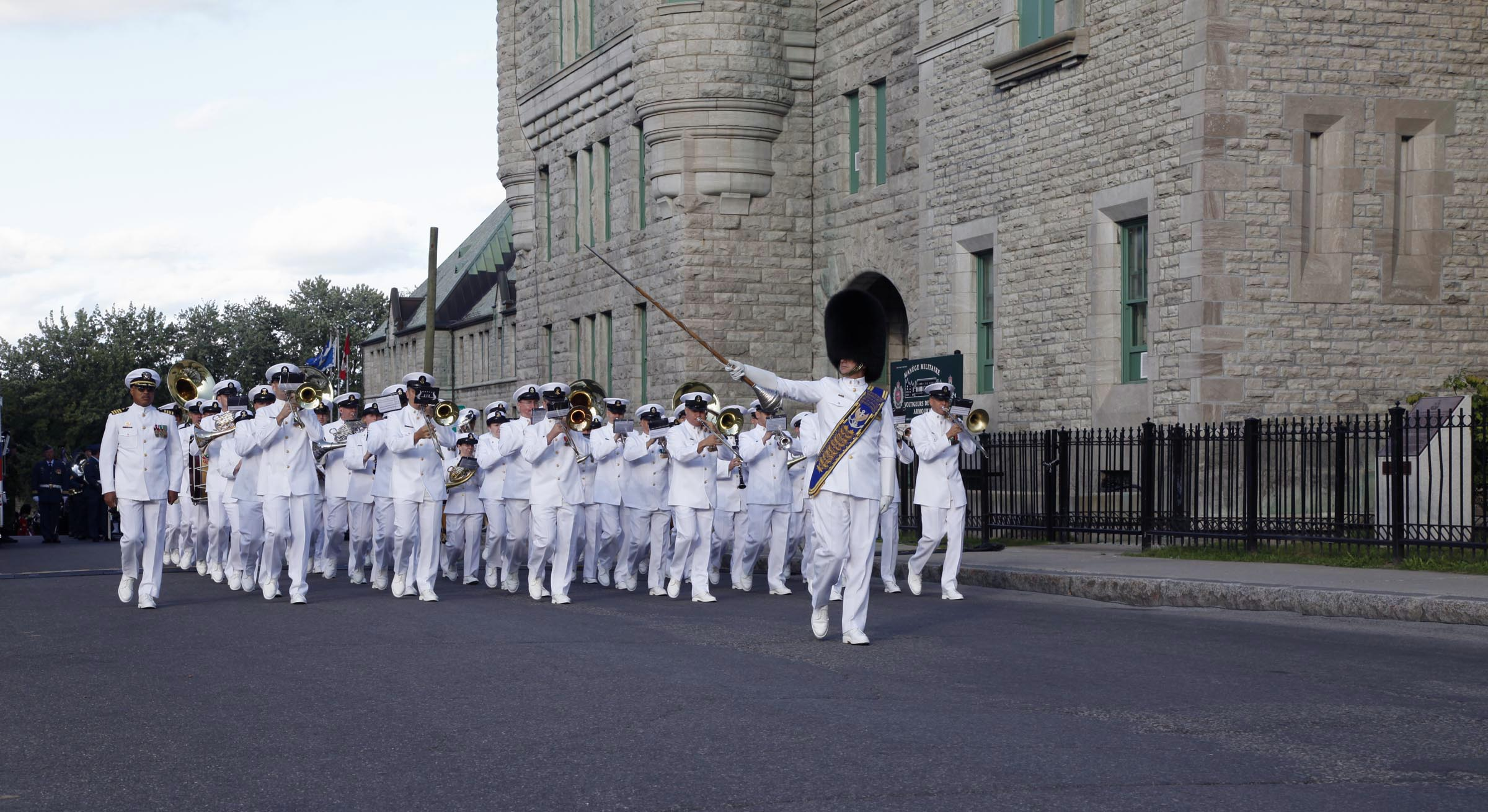
The Drum Major, Master Chief Joe D. Brown, wearing a bearskin hat and holding a ceremonial mace while leading members of the United States Navy Ceremonial Band as they march onto the parade grounds in front of the Quebec City Armoury as part of the opening ceremony of the Quebec Music Festival.

The United States Navy Band has performed at the following ceremonies and events:

- 1927 – Washington ceremony for Charles Lindbergh.
- 1929 – Washington ceremony for Adm. Richard E. Byrd
- 1962 – Washington, D.C. ceremony for astronaut John Glenn.
- 1963 – Funeral parade and funeral for President John F. Kennedy.
- 1966 – First performance by the Navy Band at New York City's Carnegie Hall
- 1981 – Return of the hostages during the Iran Hostage Crisis
- 1993 – Re-dedication of the Statue of Freedom and the Bicentennial of the United States Capitol
- 1995 – Dedication parade of the Korean War Veterans Memorial
- 1997 – Dedication of the Women in Military Service for America Memorial at Arlington National Cemetery and the Franklin Delano Roosevelt Memorial Ceremony of Dedication
- 1998 – Re-dedication of the Wright Brothers National Memorial in Kill Devil Hills, North Carolina
- 1999 – Veterans of Foreign Wars 100th Anniversary celebration at their national convention in Kansas City, Missouri
- 2000 – International Naval Review festivities in New York City
- 2001 – "United in Memory" memorial service at the Pentagon
- 2002 – "Beam of Hope" remembrance ceremony at Freedom Plaza in Washington, D.C.

=== Discography of the U.S. Navy Band ===
- 1963 – The National Cultural Center Presents the United States Navy Band, RCA Victor
- 1992 – Music for Honors and Ceremonies
- 1996 – Commemoration
- 1997 – Ports of Call
- 1997 – That Holiday Feeling
- 1998 – Seawolf
- 1998 – Coast to Coast II
- 1999 – Mystic Chords of Memory
- 2000 – American Salute
- 2000 – 75th Anniversary Collection
- 2001 – Celebrations
- 2002 – Music for Chamber Winds
- 2002 – Happy Holidays
- 2003 – Overtures and Finales
- 2005 – Light Cavalry Overture...and other Warhorses
- 2006 – Sail Loft Sounds
- 2006 – World Class Marches
- 2007 – Holiday Wishes
- 2009 – Command Performance
- 2009 – Directions
- 2011 – Derivations
- 2022 – Premieres

=== Notable members ===
- Victor Salvi, Italian-American harpist, played with the band during World War II, and later with the New York Philharmonic and the NBC Symphony Orchestra, before founding Salvi Harps.

== Music ==
Hands Across the Sea
John Philip Sousa, "Hands Across the Sea"

The Fairest of the Fair
Sousa's "The Fairest of the Fair"

Eternal Father, Strong to Save
William Whiting's "Eternal Father, Strong to Save"

A Dream of a Witches' Sabbath
The fifth movement from Hector Berlioz's Symphonie fantastique, also known as A Dream of a Witches' Sabbath

Under the Double Eagle
Josef Wagner's "Under the Double Eagle"

March Grandioso
Roland F. Seitz's "March Grandioso"

Belford's Carnival
Russell Alexander's "Belford's Carnival"

Anchors Aweigh (1929)
1929 acetate recording of Charles A. Zimmermann's "Anchors Aweigh"

Anchors Aweigh
Zimmerman's "Anchors Aweigh"

Auld Lang Syne
Robert Burns "Auld Lang Syne"

Florentiner March
Julius Fučík's "Florentiner March"

Finale of Symphony No. 4 in F minor
Tchaikovsky's Symphony No. 4 in F minor, Op. 36

Oberon Overture
Carl Maria von Weber's overture to Oberon

In Storm and Sunshine
John Clifford Heed's "In Storm and Sunshine"

== Gallery ==
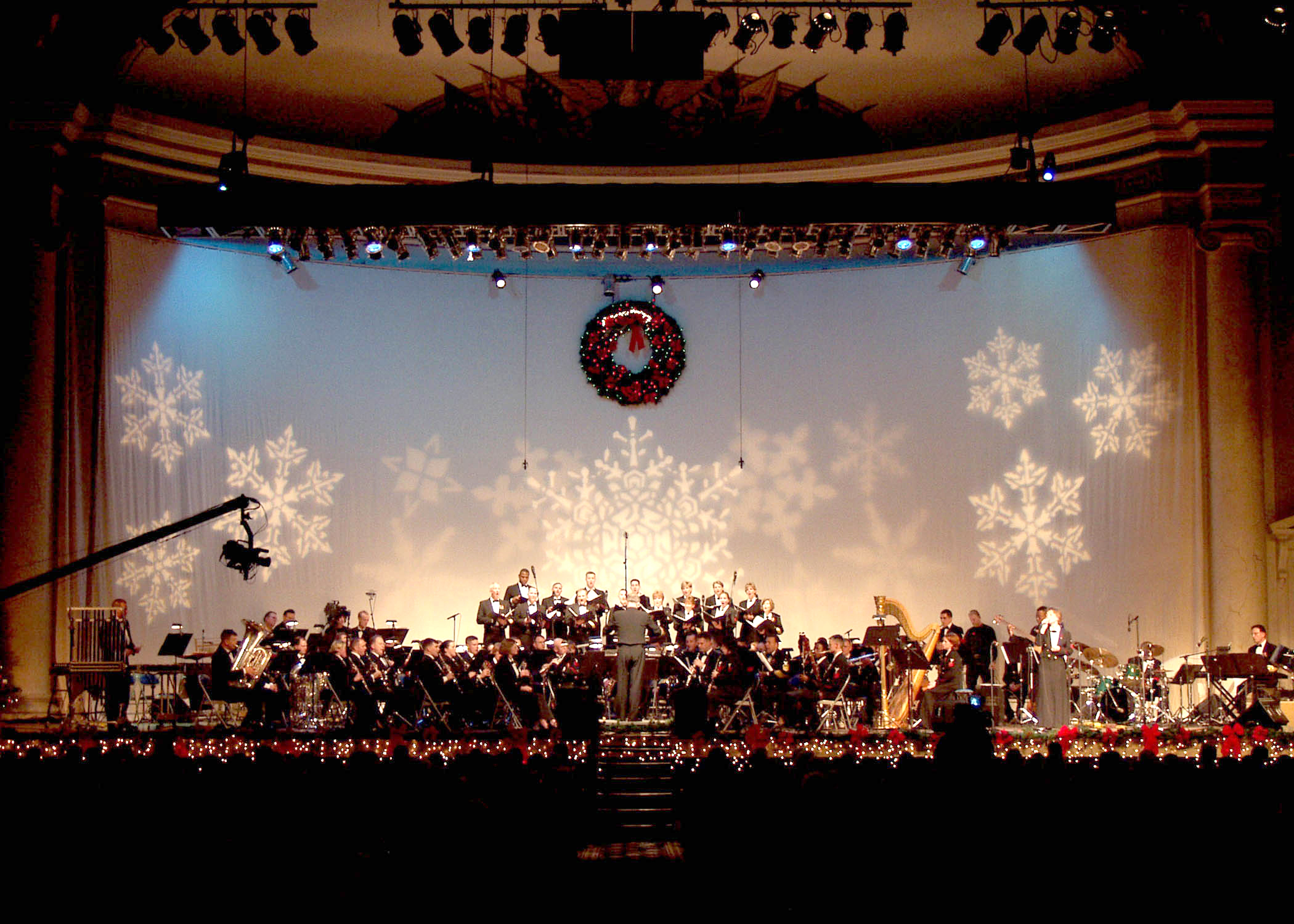
The United States Navy Band Concert Band performs traditional and popular holiday music for the television special, "Happy Holidays" at DAR Constitution Hall in Washington, D.C., 2001.

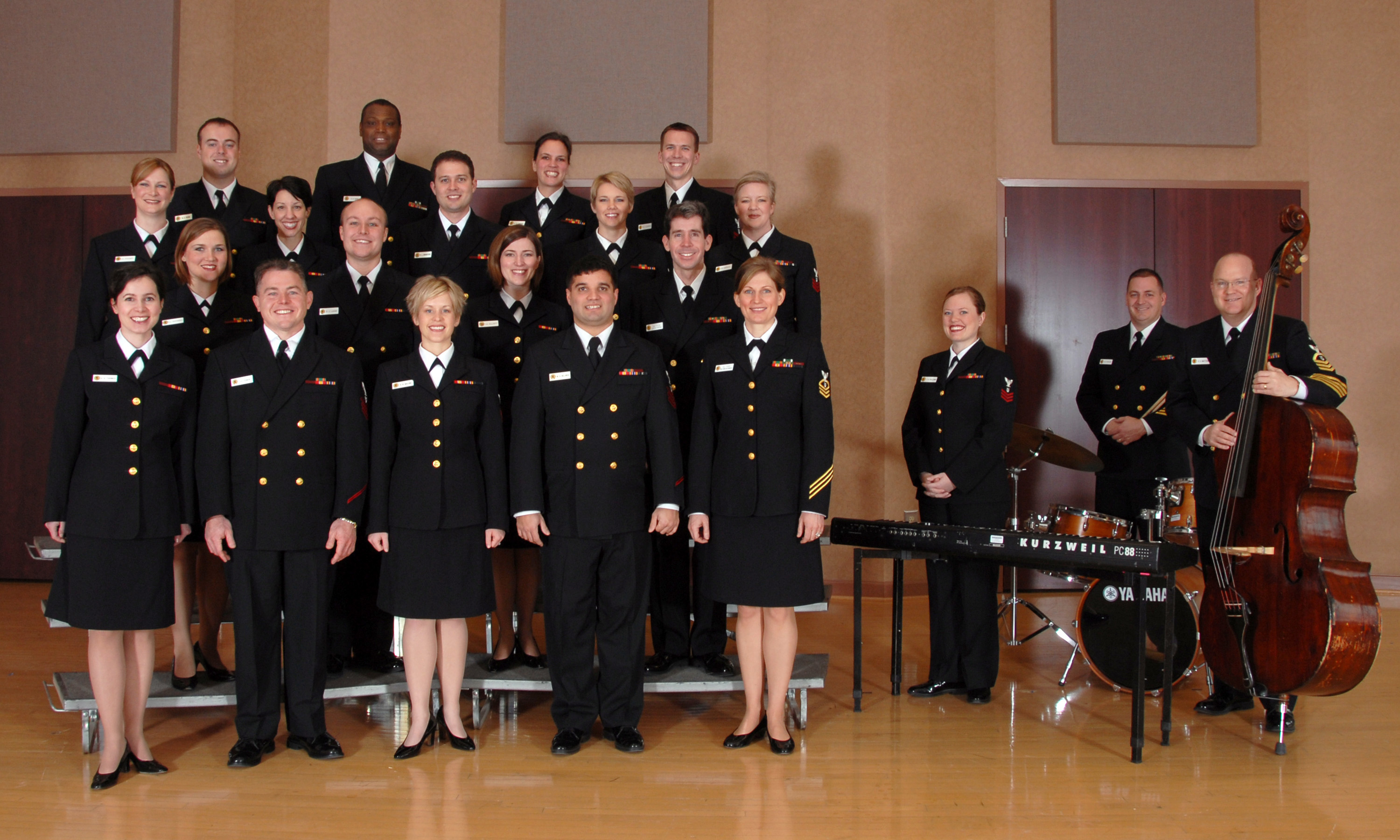
A group photo of the "Sea Chanters" chorus.

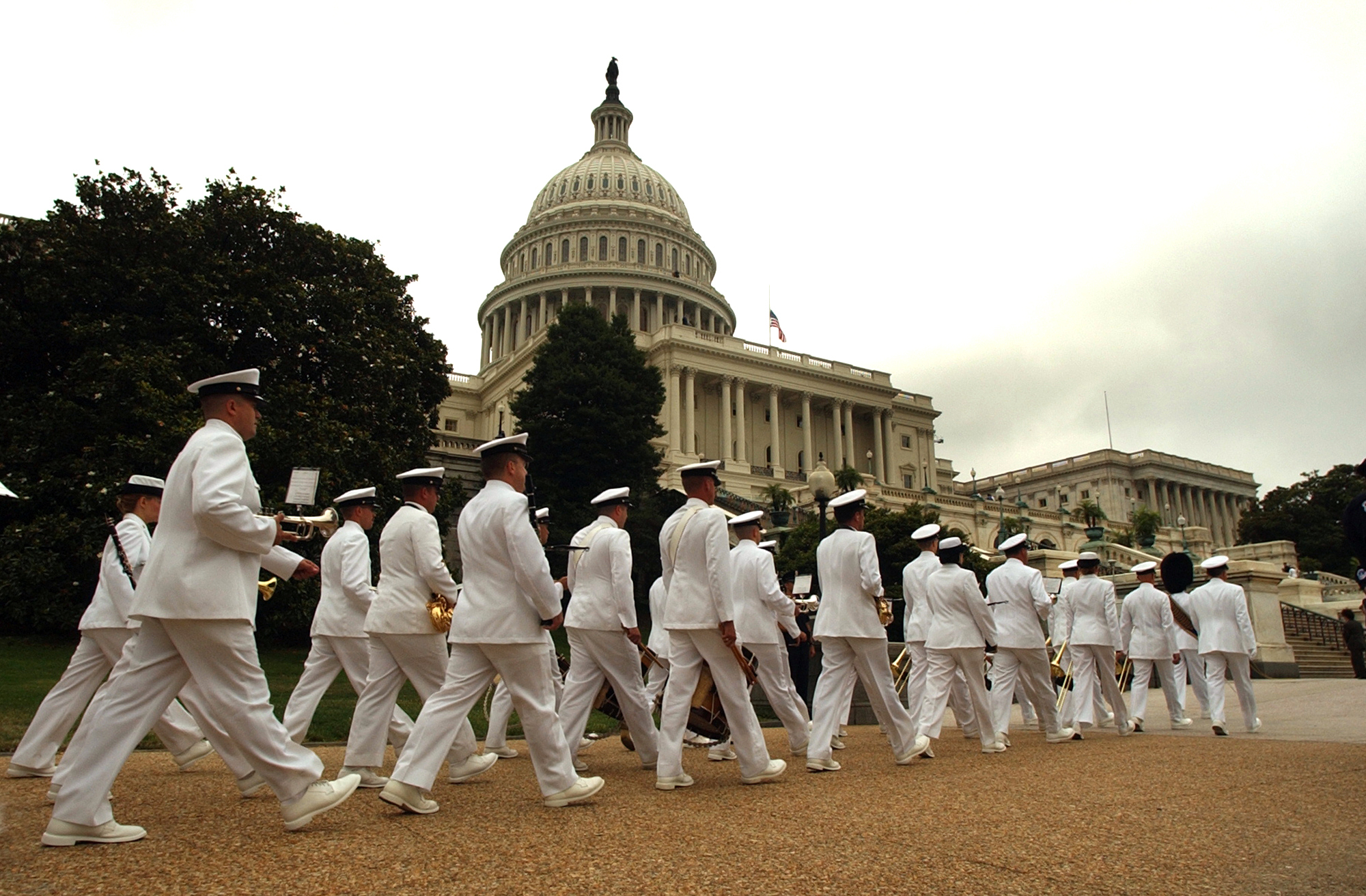
The United States Navy Ceremonial Band marching into position during a 2004 departure ceremony held at the United States Capitol Building during the state funeral of Ronald Reagan in 2004.

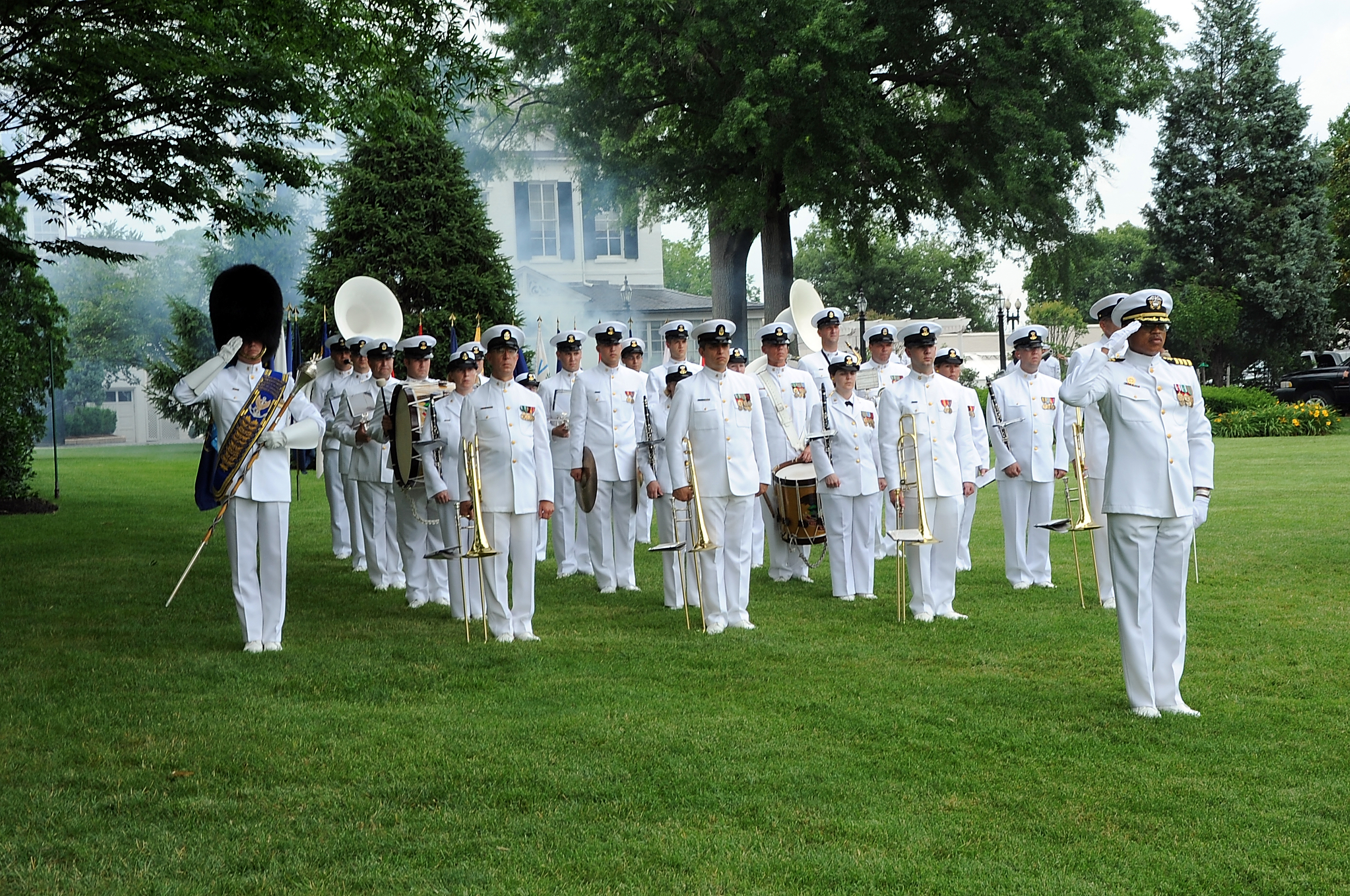
Captain George N. Thompson, commanding officer of the United States Navy Ceremonial Band, leads the Drum Major and band members as they render honors during a 19-gun salute at the swearing-in ceremony for Secretary of the Navy (SECNAV) the Honorable Ray Mabus at the Washington Navy Yard.

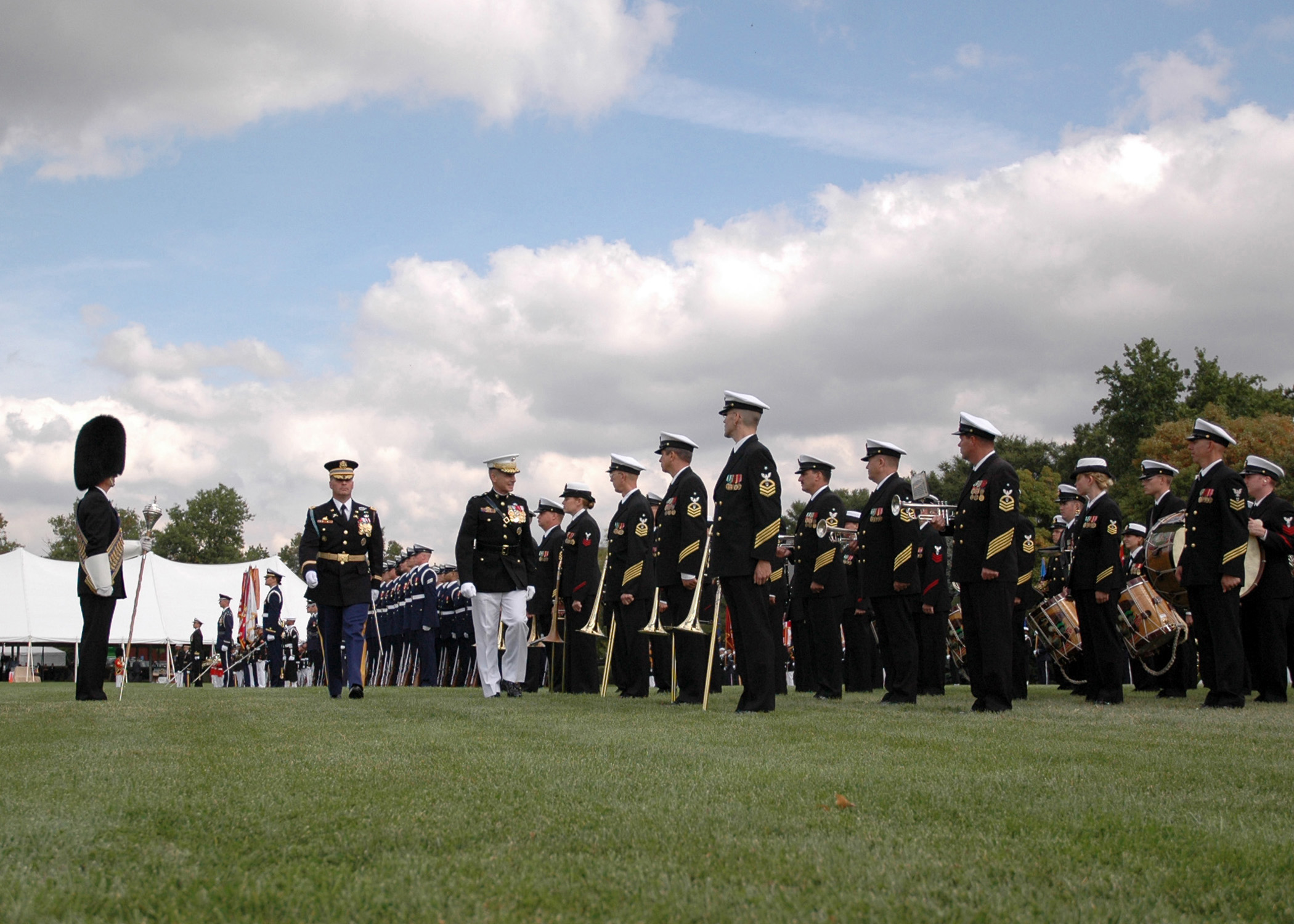
The United States Navy Ceremonial Band, under the direction of the Drum Major, Master Chief Musician Joe D. Brown Jr., standing at attention as Marine General Peter Pace approaches their formation during the change of command ceremony for the Chairman of the Joint Chiefs of Staff.

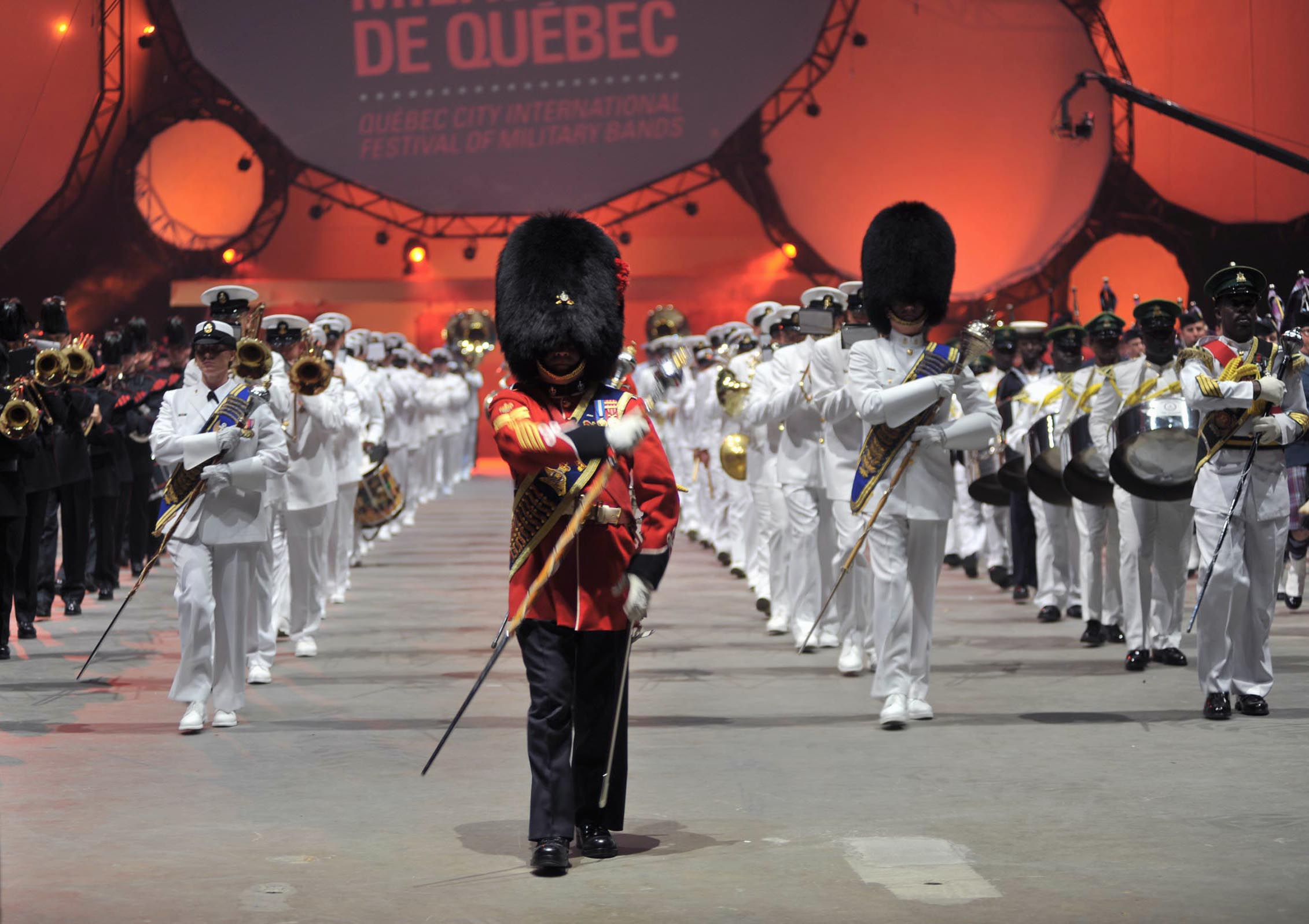
The United States Navy Band along with La Musique du Royal 22^{e} Régiment, marches off during the closing ceremony of the Quebec Tattoo at the Pepsi Coliseum, 27 August 2009.

== See also ==
- Fleet Band Activities
- Musician (United States Navy)
- United States Armed Forces School of Music
- United States military bands
- United States Naval Academy Band
- United States Navy Steel Band
- United States Navy B1 Band
