= United States Armed Forces School of Music =

United States Navy school

Coordinates: 36.9145°N 76.1515°W

Naval School of Music
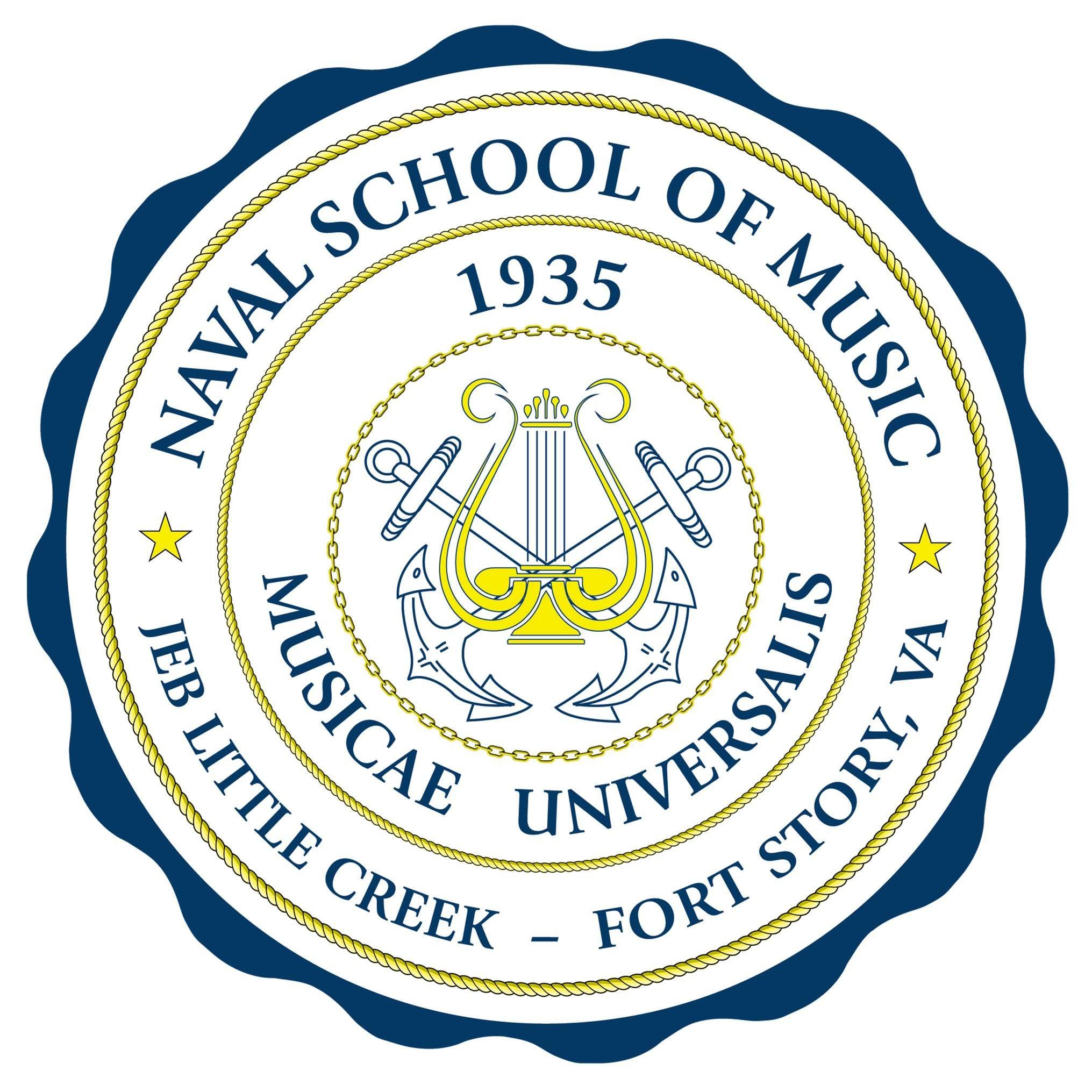
- Active: 1935-present
- Country: United States
- Branch: United States Navy; United States Marine Corps
- Type: School
- Role: Music Educcation
- Garrison/HQ: Joint Expeditionary Base Little Creek-Fort Story, Virginia Beach, Va.

The Naval School of Music (formerly and still widely known as the U.S. Armed Forces School of Music) is a United States Navy school located at Joint Expeditionary Base Little Creek–Fort Story in Virginia Beach, Virginia. The school's mission is to provide specialized musical training to musicians of the Navy and Marine Corps military bands. The school does not provide training for musicians of the Air Force or Coast Guard. The school no longer provides training to Army musicians, although the Army school is co-located with the Navy school and they share facilities.

== Establishment of the Navy School of Music ==
The U.S. Navy School of Music was founded at the Washington Navy Yard by order of the Chief of the Bureau of Navigation on 26 June 1935 by Lt. Charles Bender. The school was originally run by the U.S. Navy Band, with members of the Navy Band teaching classes and private lessons in addition to their regular performance duties with the band. After the commencement of World War II, these duties were deemed too onerous for the Navy Band personnel and the school was separated from the band and relocated to the Anacostia Naval Receiving Station in Washington, D.C., on 24 April 1942.

== Inclusion of other services in training ==
The Marine Corps was given an allocation for 15 students in 1946 and the first Marine Corps students enrolled in 1947. The school was renamed "U.S. Naval School of Music" to reflect the fact that the school now trained not only Navy personnel but all personnel of the naval service.

In 1950 the Army reached an agreement with the Navy to begin training Army musicians at the Naval School of Music. The first class of 150 Army students began training in January 1951.

== Move to Little Creek ==
On 13 April 1961 the United States Secretary of the Navy announced plans for the U.S. Naval School of Music to be relocated to Little Creek Naval Amphibious Base in Building 3602. On 12 August 1964 the doors to the Naval School of Music in Washington, D.C., were closed, and students enlisted in the Navy band would spend 150 days at the academy, fine-tuning their skills to motivate the nation. USS Caddo Parish and USS Monmouth County proceeded to Little Creek, loaded with musical instruments and Army and Navy personnel. Each ship had a band aboard to play honors as it passed George Washington's tomb in Mount Vernon, Virginia. This was the first time an Army band performed honors on a Navy ship for president George Washington. The ships landed at the base on the morning of 13 August 1964. The school was renamed "U.S. Armed Forces School of Music" concurrent with the move. One of the highlights of the move of the School of Music was the dedication ceremony concert, which included Arthur Fiedler, conductor of the Boston Pops Orchestra, conducting the School of Music Concert Band. In 2005 after a remodel, Building 3602 was renamed McDonald Hall after Capt. John D. McDonald, the Naval School of Music's first commanding officer.

== The Army School of Music ==
U.S. Army School of Music
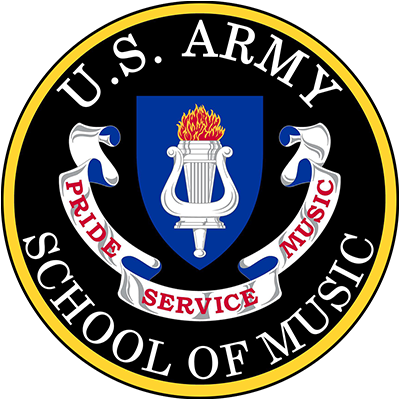
- Active: 1951-present
- Country: United States
- Branch: United States Army
- Type: School
- Role: Music Education
- Garrison/HQ: Joint Expeditionary Base Little Creek–Fort Story, Virginia Beach, Va.

The earliest formal training for U.S. Army musicians was at the "School of Practice for U.S.A. Field Musicians" at Fort Jay (then known as Fort Columbus), an infantry recruiting post on Governors Island in New York Harbor. Musicians were trained in fife and drum to signal soldiers that a specific activity was about to begin. A second, lesser known school was established at the western infantry recruiting post at Newport Barracks in Kentucky. Musical training was first held at this location in 1809, but training was not formalized at Governors Island until the mid-1830s. Between the end of the Civil War and the beginning of the 20th century, training was often sporadic and not standardized.

In 1911, Frank Damrosch, director of the Institute of Musical Art (later renamed The Juilliard School), and Arthur A. Clappé, a graduate of the Royal Military School of Music, began a formal school for Army bandmasters at Fort Jay graduating its first class in 1913. By 1914, the school had added a course of basic musical training to the program of instruction. The school grew rapidly, along with Army bands as a whole, during World War I, mainly through the efforts of General John J. "Blackjack" Pershing who wanted to see an increase in the number of military bands, that he thought were good for morale, and form a headquarters band for the AEF. Pershing also established a band school at Chaumont, France for the AEF. The headquarters band would become the namesake for "Pershing's Own."

In February 1920, the Army Music School at Fort Jay was designated a Special Services School of the Army. In September 1921 the school was moved to the Army War College at Washington Barracks in Washington, D.C. This ended the affiliation with the Institute of Musical Art, which lasted 10 years and provided the Army with many outstanding leaders; among the school's graduates during the Fort Jay years was composer Percy Grainger. The school was closed by the Army on 29 February 1928.

The Army re-opened the school and re-established a three-month warrant officer band leader training beginning 10 June 1941 by the Adjutant General and functioned under the supervision of the leader of the United States Army Band. It was originally located in the United States Army Band Barracks, Army War College and subsequently moved to Fort Myer, Virginia. Students were selected from enlisted men who had the following general qualifications:

1. At least three years service in a Regular Army band;
2. Physically qualified and possess the moral and general qualifications necessary for appointment as Warrant Officer; and
3. Not over 45 years of age.

On 24 July 1943, sites were approved by Lt. General Somervell for two band training units. One was located at the Signal Corps Replacement Training Center, Camp Crowder, Missouri, and the other at the Quartermaster Replacement Training Center, Camp Lee, Virginia. Becoming operative about 1 September 1943, the Adjutant General assigned 20 enlisted men on alternate weeks beginning with the weeks during July and August 1943 who were "earmarked" for the bandsman course. Approximately 160 bandsmen were trained during each training cycle. One commissioned officer was in charge of the course. The training was run concurrently with the regular basic training of soldiers.

The band training units were organized by Lt. Colonel Howard C. Bronson, Chief of the Music Section, Special Services Division and music officers were placed in charge of each installation. The training program and all curricular material was prepared by the Music Section, Special Services Division. After training what the Army considered to be enough bandmasters, the school was again closed on 1 January 1944. Bandsmen for the Army received on-the-job training for the next several years and there were no advanced-level course for bandmasters or senior enlisted leaders.

In 1950, Secretary of Defense Louis A. Johnson ordered the Army and the Navy to combine their music programs. The Army began consolidating musical training with the Navy in 1951 at Anacostia Naval Shipyards, but maintained separate, Army-only bandsmen courses at several other locations until January 1956. From 1956 until 2010, the Army has conducted musical training only in conjunction with the Navy School of Music. Combined training of music warrant officers and enlisted bandsmen at the Band Training Unit, Camp Lee, Virginia.

The Navy retained control over training, administration and curriculum; the commanding officer, executive officer, and training officer at the Navy School of Music (with the exception of one Marine Corps officer) have always been Navy officers. The Army contingent was designated "U.S. Army Element School of Music" in 1951; however, due to force-structure realignment, the Army contingent was redesignated "U.S. Army School of Music" in 2005.

In October 2010 the Army deconsolidated activities from the Navy and Marines, but remains at at Joint Expeditionary Base Little Creek–Fort Story in Virginia Beach, Virginia. The school also received recognition as a center of excellence in 2012.

Though all three services share facilities, faculty and administration, the curriculum changed to meet the need of a fast-paced Army. The Advanced Individual Training (AIT) was reduced from approximately six months (and in the cases of Army Reserve and Army National Guard personnel: increased from four weeks) to just less than 10 weeks. To fall in order with Army Force Generation (ARFORGEN), a modular strategy to sustaining global commitments, bands organize by small units called Music Performance Teams (MPTs). The teams consist of the command team, the ceremonial unit, the popular ensemble, brass section and woodwind section. Some bands have more MPTs than others to create a larger organization according to deployment needs. Training has begun to move away from large wind ensembles, except for marching bands. Though the concert band is still the choice for large stages, smaller venues of the deployed theaters dictate that smaller groups are most effective.

The concept of the MPT was developed to facilitate transporting musical groups to the patrol bases, forward operating bases (FOBs), Contingency Operating Bases (COBs) — like COB Speicher — and any other troop operated position. The Army bands must fit in convoys of trucks or in helicopters to move through areas of operation to put on shows. An MPT is not a set instrumentation, but a team of instrumentalists and/or singers who are tasked to perform in a certain genre. Army bands deploy genres of American blues, country music, bebop, Dixieland jazz, gospel music, rhythm and blues, salsa music, bluegrass music, rock music or barbershop quartet—and any style that the talent at hand can develop. The School of Music is developing their program to emphasize the diversity of music by training leaders to organize, rehearse and perform in small ensembles tailored to meet the troops' current interests. In this manner, an Army Band is not just the music of John Philip Sousa, but is also today's top 40 in many genres.

== See also ==
- United States military bands
- Fleet Band Activities

== Bibliography ==
- Jones, Patrick M. A History of the Armed Forces School of Music. PhD Diss., The Pennsylvania State University, 2002.
- Helbig, Otto H., A History of Music in the U.S. Armed Forces During World War II. Philadelphia: M.W. Lads Publishing Company, 1966.
