= Manhattan Ensemble Theatre =

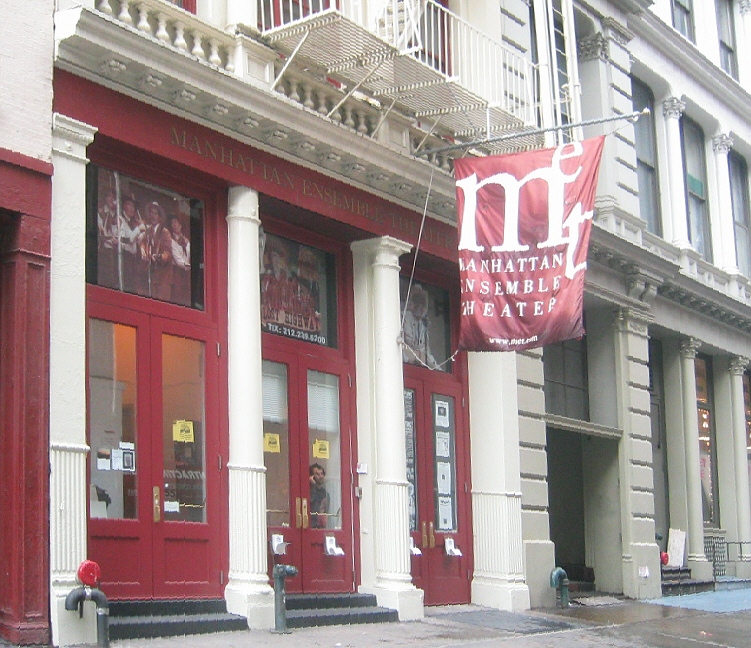
Manhattan Ensemble Theatre, at 55 Mercer Street in New York City, in 2003

Manhattan Ensemble Theatre (MET) was a nonprofit, theatre company based in New York City from 1999 to 2007. The company was founded as an Off-Broadway, Equity repertory company in 1999 by writer-producer David Fishelson with the stated mission of creating theatrical adaptations of stories found in fiction, journalism, film, biography and memoir.

== Production history ==
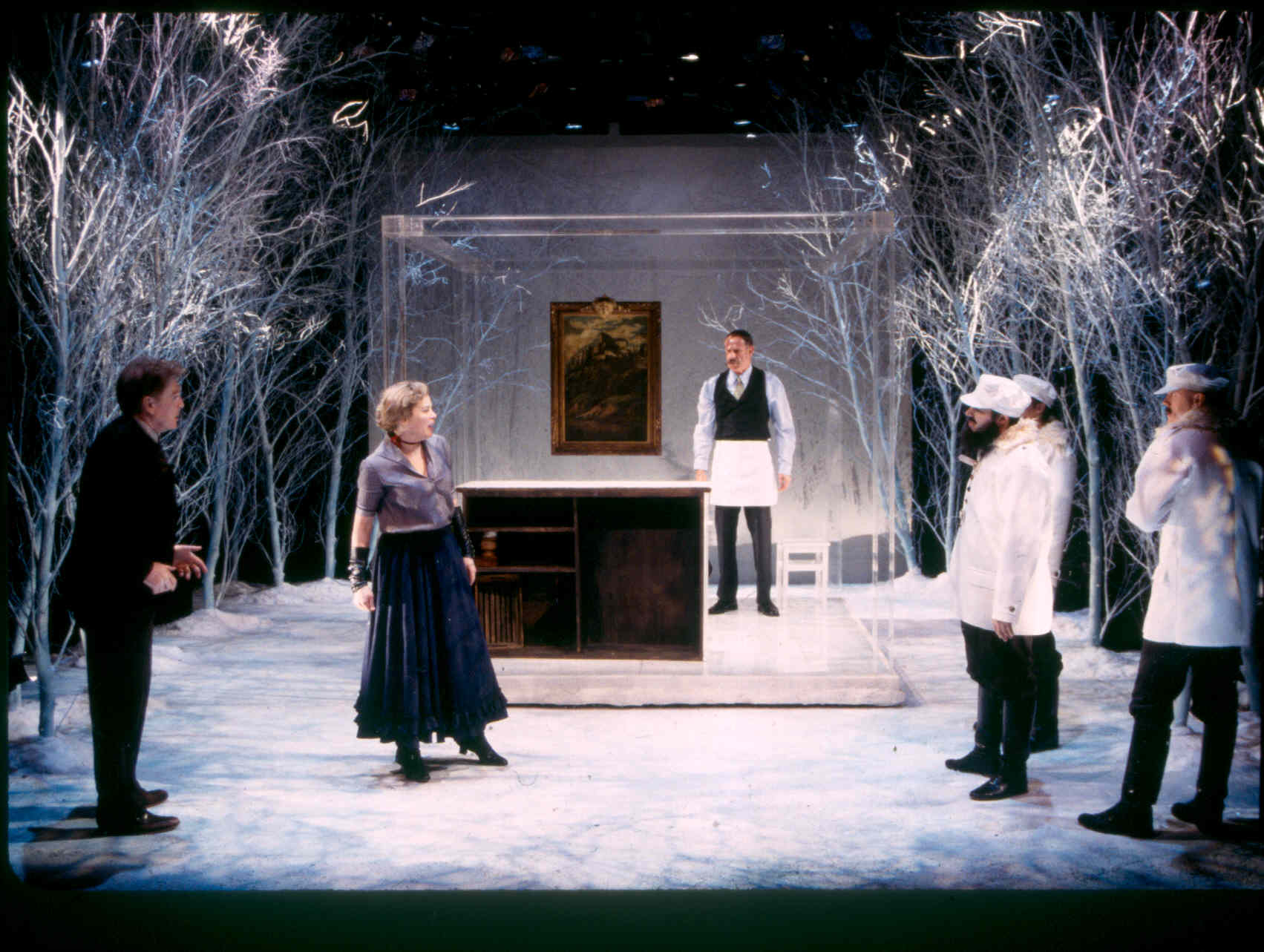
(left to right:) William Atherton, Catherine Curtin, Dan Ziskie, Steven Rosen, Raynor Scheine and Sean McCourt in The Castle at Manhattan Ensemble Theatre, January 6, 2002.

- 2001: The Idiot
- 2002: Franz Kafka's The Castle, The Golem, Death In Venice
- 2003: Hank Williams: Lost Highway, Golda's Balcony (Off-Broadway)
- 2003-5: Golda's Balcony (on Broadway), 9 Parts of Desire
- 2005-6: Golda's Balcony (national tour)

== Stars and transfers ==
In its short history, MET featured several well-known stars in its productions, including Jim Parsons (CBS's The Big Bang Theory), Mireille Enos (AMC's The Killing), and Robert Prosky (Hill Street Blues, Broadcast News, Dead Man Walking).

The 2003-4 season saw frequent transfers of shows from the 140-seat MET home, as described in Playbill:

With Golda's Balcony (which opened at the Helen Hayes Theatre on Broadway on Oct. 15), MET has two hits based on the lives of renowned historical figures. Its first offering this season, Hank Williams: Lost Highway, about the troubled country singer and composer, was hailed and quickly transferred following an extended run. It is currently playing the Little Shubert Off-Broadway. (In fact, the runaway success of MET's first two shows caused the nonprofit to postpone its third selection until the (2004-05) season.)

== Awards, nominations, and reviews ==
From 2002 to 2006, MET earned 31 nominations (winning 11) from various theatre award agencies, including the Tony, the Drama Desk, the Obie, the Outer Critics Circle, the Lucille Lortel, the Drama League, the Blackburn Prize, Time Out New York Magazine's Best in Theatre (4 times) and the Touring Broadway awards. Notable reviews came from Anthony DeCurtis in Rolling Stone for Lost Highway ("I was genuinely surprised, even stunned ... by Hank Williams: Lost Highway. ... a rare achievement in any musical theater that I've ever seen"), from John Simon in New York Magazine ("Golda's Balcony is the perfect merging of playwright, actress and character"), and from John Lahr for Nine Parts of Desire in The New Yorker ("An example of how art can remake the world").

== 55 Mercer Street and sale of lease ==
The company was located in a 140-seat theatre in Manhattan's SoHo neighborhood at 55 Mercer Street (corner of Broome Street) until early 2007 when, according to The New York Times,

The success of (MET's) show Golda's Balcony — and the time demanded by transferring the show to Broadway in 2003, then taking it on the road — had forced (Fishelson) ... to find someone to take over the 10 years remaining on his theater's lease.

In 2006, the Culture Project, a 10 year-old downtown nonprofit theater at the time, bought the remaining years on the 55 Mercer Street theater's lease.
