= David Fishelson =

American dramatist

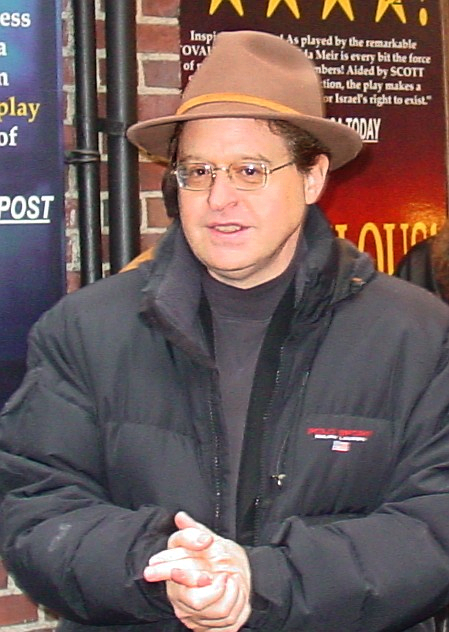
- Fishelson outside Golda's Balcony on Broadway, 2005.
- Born: July 24, 1956 (age 70); Wooster, Ohio, US
- Education: Andover; University of Wisconsin-Madison (BA)
- Occupations: Theatre producer, playwright, film director
- Years active: 1982–present
- Children: 2

David J. Fishelson (born July 24, 1956) is an American producer, playwright, and director for film, theatre, television and radio, based in Manhattan since 1982. He is best known for being the lead producer of Golda's Balcony, the longest-running one-woman show in Broadway history (2003–2005)—which he also produced as a 2019 film, Golda's Balcony, that was popular in over 75 film festivals in 2019–20)—as well as being the founder/producer of Manhattan Ensemble Theatre, an award-winning Off-Broadway theatre company located in SoHo, New York City. As a filmmaker, his work has been broadcast on PBS, exhibited theatrically, and selected for 87 international film festivals (winning at 30). As a theatre producer and playwright (both on Broadway and off), his work has garnered 31 nominations (winning 11) from the Tony Award, Drama Desk, Outer Critics Circle, Obie, Drama League, Lortel, Blackburn Prize and Touring Broadway awards organizations, while landing on Time Out NY's year-end "Best in Theatre" list on 4 different occasions.

== Early life ==
Fishelson was born in Wooster, Ohio to a Jewish family. His mother, Julia Fishelson (née Amster, 1924–2013), was a women's shelter activist and art center founder, and his father Joseph E. Fishelson (1914–1991) was an entrepreneur, inventor and college professor. David Fishelson attended Phillips Academy in Andover, Massachusetts (class of 1974), and the University of Wisconsin-Madison (class of 1978) — where his mentor was film scholar David Bordwell — before attending one year of graduate school at the University of Paris III: Sorbonne Nouvelle (1978–79). In Paris, in 1978, he met Zoe Zinman, who would become his collaborator on the feature film City News (1983). After Paris, he moved to New York City in 1979.

== Career ==
=== The eighties, City News, PBS' American Playhouse ===
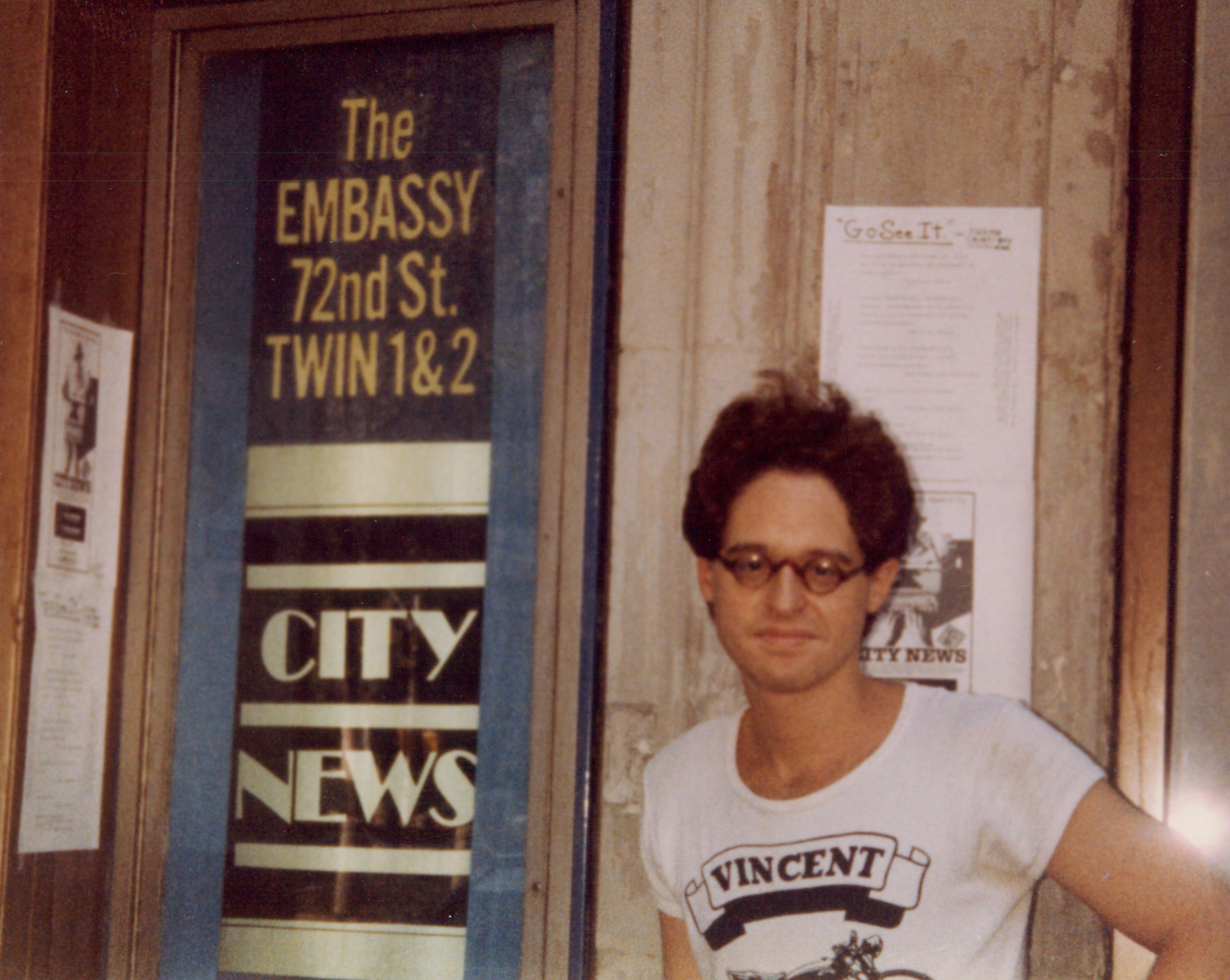
Fishelson at the opening of City News, NYC, Oct. 1983.

From 1979 to 1983, Fishelson worked as a production assistant in the film and television industry in New York, while writing and directing the feature film City News with Zinman. Shot on a small budget, City News found success in 1983–4 by being selected for the Film Festivals of Atlanta, Edinburgh, Houston, Munich, Florence, Athens, Santa Fe, Seattle, Vancouver, Dallas, Göteborg and Antwerp — winning "Best Dramatic Film" at Atlanta, "Best Low-Budget Feature" at Houston, and "Best Feature (Narrative)" at Athens. After its tour of festivals, City News was exhibited in U.S. theaters by film distributor Cinecom Pictures, and was nationally broadcast on the third season (1984) of the PBS television series American Playhouse. By 1989, City News had been curated for the permanent collection of the Museum of Television & Radio, as well as listed in the American Film Institute's Catalog of Feature Films.

=== The nineties, Cocteau Rep, NPR, plays published ===
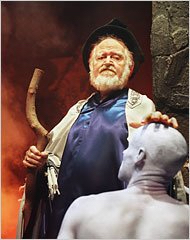
(left to right:) Robert Prosky and Joseph McKenna in Fishelson's adaptation of The Golem at Manhattan Ensemble Theatre, 2002

In 1989, Fishelson joined the staff of the Off-Broadway repertory theatre company Jean Cocteau Repertory (a.k.a. "The Cocteau", founded 1973), located on the Bowery (NYC) at the Bouwerie Lane Theatre. Fishelson was the Cocteau's executive director from 1989 to 1992, its associate artistic director from 1992 to 1994, and a resident director there from 1994 to 1997, where he wrote and directed dramatizations of two novels by Fyodor Dostoyevsky: The Idiot and The Brothers Karamazov. Following reviews in The New York Times, both plays were published by Dramatists Play Service (1995). In 1994 and 1997, they were broadcast as radio plays – with Fishelson directing both – on the NPR series National Public Radio Playhouse, starring Ed Asner, Sharon Gless and Harry Hamlin among others. Both dramatizations remain in circulation (in written and audio/radio drama format), and both continue to be produced worldwide, including (in the 2000s) runs at Copenhagen's Royal Danish Theatre (2006), as well as the Aarhus Theatre (2007). Following both plays' publication, Fishelson became a member of the Dramatists Guild of America.

=== The 2000s and 2010s, MET, Hank and Golda, Broadway and touring, 9 Parts, Golda as film ===
In 1999, Fishelson founded his own theater company – the nonprofit, 140-seat, Off-Broadway "Manhattan Ensemble Theatre" ("MET") — with a stated mission "to create new theatrical adaptations of stories found in fiction, journalism, film, biography and memoir." From 1999 to 2007, Fishelson's MET featured several well-known stars in its productions, including Jim Parsons (CBS's The Big Bang Theory), Mireille Enos (AMC's The Killing), Robert Prosky (NBC's Hill Street Blues), Valerie Harper (CBS's The Mary Tyler Moore Show), and Tovah Feldshuh (NBC's Holocaust). Among Fishelson's nine shows from 1999 to 2007 were two of his own plays: an adaptation of the Yiddish play The Golem; and his dramatization of Franz Kafka's unfinished novel The Castle. For the latter, Fishelson was nominated in 2002 for "Best Off-Broadway Play" by the Outer Critics Circle, as well as for "Best Play" by the Drama League (each time as writer and producer). With the publication of The Golem and The Castle in 2003, Fishelson had four published plays to his name.

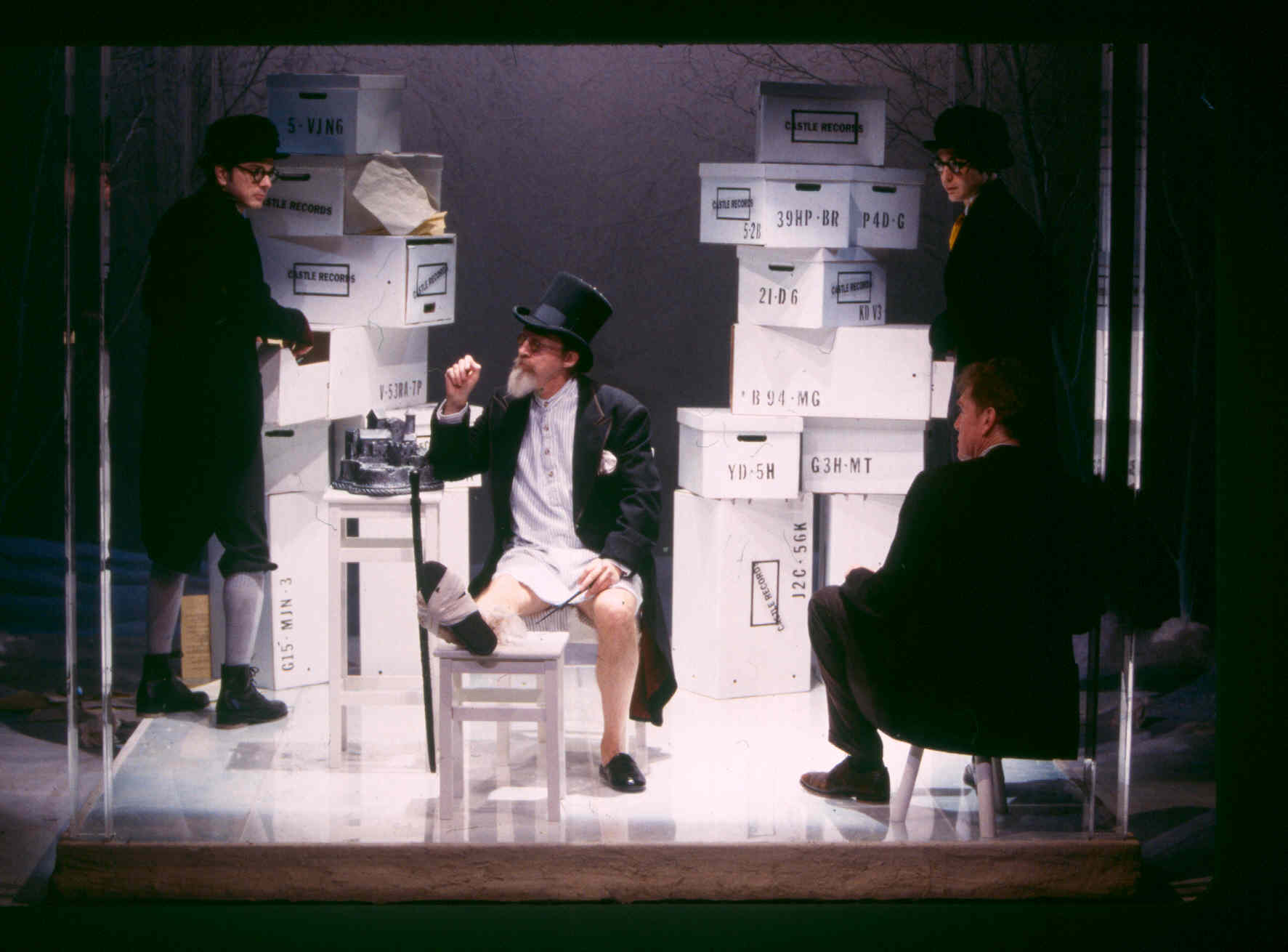
(left to right:) Grant Varjas, Raynor Scheine, Jim Parsons and William Atherton in Fishelson's adaptation of Franz Kafka's The Castle at Manhattan Ensemble Theatre, 2002.

Fishelson's 2003–04 season saw frequent transfers of his shows from MET's 140-seat, SoHo-based home, as described in Playbill:

With Golda's Balcony (which opened at the Helen Hayes Theatre on Broadway on Oct. 15), MET has two hits based on the lives of renowned historical figures. Its first offering this season, Hank Williams: Lost Highway, about the troubled country singer and composer, was hailed and quickly transferred following an extended run. It is currently playing the Little Shubert Off-Broadway. (In fact, the runaway success of MET's first two shows caused the nonprofit to postpone its third selection until the (2004–05) season.)

Before transferring, Lost Highway earned positive reviews in the New York press and multiple theatre award nominations, including two for Fishelson in the "Best Musical" and "Best Off-Broadway Musical" categories. Rolling Stone critic and editor Anthony DeCurtis wrote "I was genuinely surprised, even stunned by [MET's version of] Hank Williams: Lost Highway.... a rare achievement in any musical theater that I've ever seen”; while Jeremy McCarter of New York Magazine called Fishelson's production "electrifying", "the most successful jukebox musical I've seen," and "New York's most exciting new musical since Urinetown."

Fishelson's three subsequent mountings of Golda's Balcony, the one-woman show about Israeli Prime Minister Golda Meir, earned nominations and awards in each of its manifestations, including Off-Broadway (a 4-month sold-out run at the MET SoHo space), on Broadway (starring Tovah Feldshuh), and the 9-month "National Tour" of the U.S. and Canada (starring Valerie Harper). The Off-Broadway production earned a Drama League "Best Play" nomination for Fishelson (as producer); the Broadway production earned a 2004 Tony Award nomination for "Best Actress" for Feldshuh, and went on to become the longest-running one-woman show in Broadway history; while the National Tour won Fishelson the 2006 "Best Play" Touring Broadway Award from the Broadway League (shared with playwright William Gibson). After lead producing both the Broadway show and its tour, Fishelson was invited to become a Tony Award voter, a status he retains to the present day. Critic John Simon, in his New York Magazine review of the Broadway version, wrote that "Golda's Balcony is the perfect merging of playwright, actress and character."

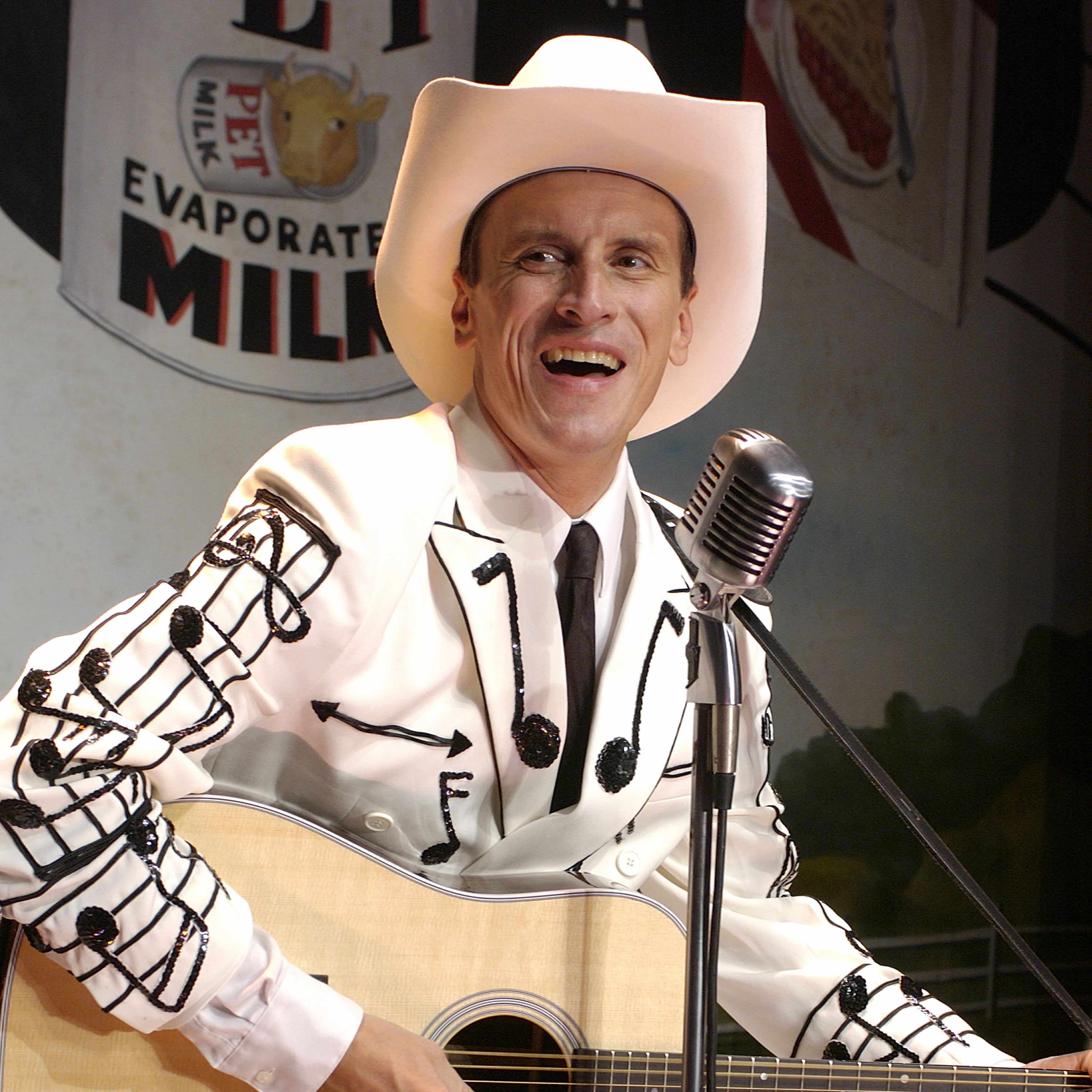
Jason Petty as Hank Williams in Lost Highway at Manhattan Ensemble Theatre, 2002

Fishelson's final production in the MET space was Heather Raffo's 9 Parts of Desire, winner of the 2005 Lortel Award for "Best Solo Production" (shared by Fishelson and Raffo), and recipient of a 2005 Susan Smith Blackburn Prize for "Best English Language Play Written by a Woman". 9 Parts of Desire had a 9-month sold-out run from 2004 to 2005, and earned MET some of its more positive reviews – with John Lahr in The New Yorker calling it "an example of how art can remake the world," and Charles Isherwood in The New York Times calling it an "impassioned theatrical documentary about contemporary Iraqi women[,] marked by vivid, memorable details." Following its run at MET, Fishelson arranged for further productions of 9 Parts at five of the larger LORT theaters in the U.S. — including Berkeley Rep, Seattle Rep, Los Angeles' Geffen Playhouse, Philadelphia's Wilma Theater, and D.C.'s Arena Stage — through the fall of 2006.

In 2019–20, Fishelson and MET produced and distributed the feature film Golda's Balcony which went on to win 21 “Audience Favorite” awards at 75 international film festivals in 2019–20.

== Producing, directing, and writing credits ==
Producing

- City News (1983, feature film/PBS, YouTube)
- Golda's Balcony (2019–20, feature film)
- The Vanek Plays (Havel) (1992, Off-Broadway play)
- The Idiot (1992–93, Off-Broadway play)
- The Brothers Karamazov (1994, Off-Broadway play)
- The Idiot (2001, Off-Broadway play)
- The Castle (2002, Off-Broadway play)
- The Golem (2002, Off-Broadway play)
- Death in Venice (2002, Off-Broadway play)
- Hank Williams: Lost Highway (2002–03, Off-Broadway play)

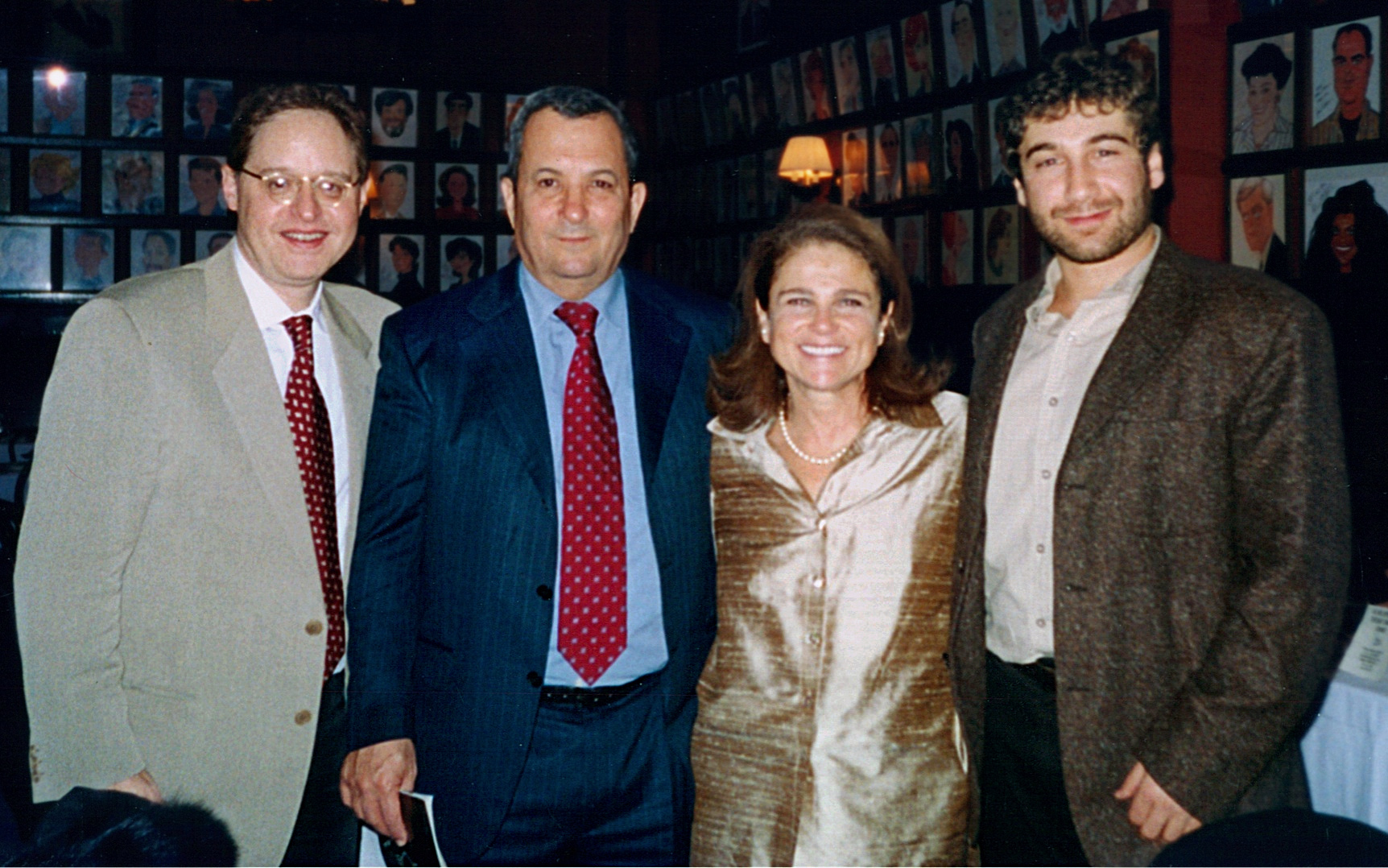
(left to right): Fishelson, former Israeli Prime Minister Ehud Barak, Tovah Feldshuh and Scott Schwartz at Sardi's, after a Broadway performance of Golda's Balcony, October 2004.

- Golda's Balcony (2003, Off-Broadway play)
- Golda's Balcony (2003–2005, Broadway play)
- 9 Parts of Desire (2004–05, Off-Broadway play)
- Golda's Balcony (2005–06, National Broadway tour of U.S. and Canada)
- 9 Parts of Desire (2005–06, National Regional tour of LORT Theaters in the U.S.)

Directing

- City News (1983, feature film/PBS, w/Zoe Zinman, YouTube)
- The Vanek Plays (Havel) (1992, Off-Broadway play)
- The Idiot (1992, Off-Broadway play)
- The Brothers Karamazov (1994, Off-Broadway play)
- The Gospel Truth (1995, television episode of "City Arts", WNET-TV ch. 13)
- The Brothers Karamazov (1994, NPR radio play)
- The Idiot (1997, NPR radio play)
- The Idiot (2001, Off-Broadway play)

Writing

- City News (1983, screenplay (with Zoe Zinman), feature film/PBS, YouTube)
- The Idiot (drama, published 1995)
- The Brothers Karamazov (drama, published 1995)
- The Castle (drama, with Aaron Leichter, published 2002)
- The Golem (drama, published 2002)

== Awards and nominations ==
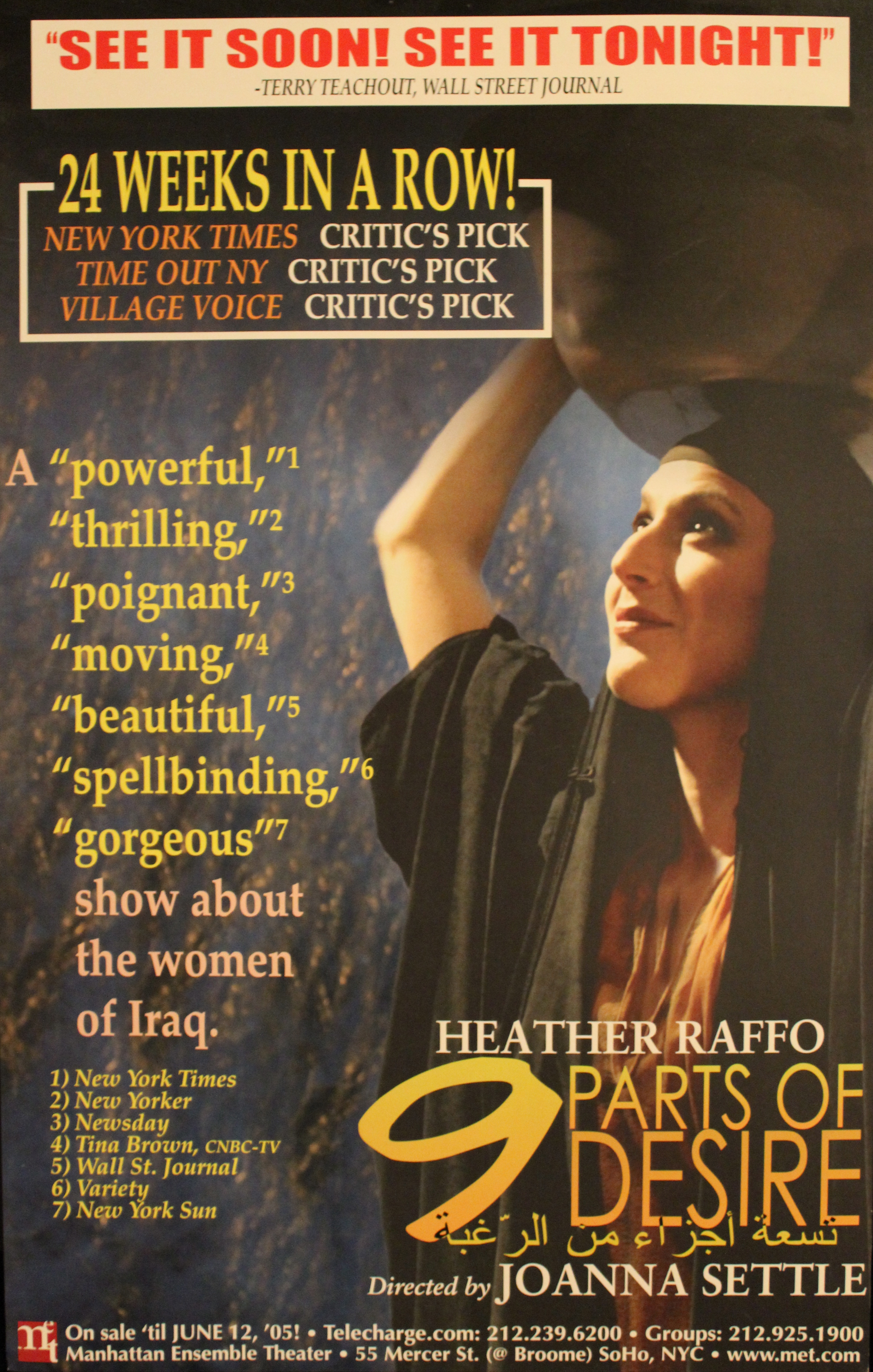
9 Parts of Desire: produced (and poster designed) by Fishelson at Manhattan Ensemble Theatre, 2005

As a writer and producer for theatre, Fishelson individually has earned 11 nominations (winning 6), while his producing of the feature films City News and Golda's Balcony (2019 film) have respectively won 3 Festival awards and 21 “Best Feature” awards at various international film festivals in 2019–20.

- 2006 Broadway Touring Award for Best Play, Golda's Balcony National Tour (Producer)
- 2005 Lucille Lortel Award for Best Solo Production, 9 Parts of Desire (Producer)
- 2004 Time Out Best in Theater: 9 Parts of Desire (Producer)
- 2003 Lucille Lortel Nomination for Best Musical, Hank Williams: Lost Highway (Producer)
- 2003 Outer Critics Circle Nomination for Best Off-Broadway Musical, Hank Williams: Lost Highway (Producer)
- 2003 Time Out Best in Theater: Hank Williams: Lost Highway (Producer)
- 2003 Time Out Best in Theater: Golda's Balcony (Producer)
- 2003 Drama League Nomination for Best Play, Golda's Balcony (Producer)
- 2002 Drama League Nomination for Best Play, The Castle (Writer and producer)
- 2002 Outer Critics Circle Nomination for Best Off-Broadway Play, The Castle (Writer and producer)
- 2002 Time Out Best in Theater: Death in Venice (Producer)
- 1983 Atlanta Film Festival: Winner, "Best Dramatic Film", City News (Co-writer, producer, director)
- 1983 Houston Int'l Film Festival: Winner, "Best Low-Budget Feature", City News (Co-writer, producer, director)
- 1983 Athens (OH) Film Festival: Winner, "Best Feature (Narrative)", City News (Co-writer, producer, director)

== Personal life ==
Fishelson is a member of The Dramatists Guild, a Tony voter, and an occasional lecturer in theatre producing, nonprofit management, and playwriting. His future, stated projects for the theatre include an adaptation of a "well-known French New Wave film for the stage", and "an original play about the Holocaust called The Hamlet Syndrome". He lives in Manhattan and has two adult children.
