= Golda's Balcony (film) =

2019 film by Scott Schwartz

- Directed by: Scott Schwartz
- Written by: William Gibson
- Based on: Golda's Balcony by William Gibson
- Produced by: David Fishelson
- Starring: Tovah Feldshuh
- Cinematography: Yves Gerard Issembert
- Edited by: Israel Nava; David Fishelson
- Music by: Mark Bennett
- Production companies: Issembert Productions; Manhattan Ensemble Theatre
- Distributed by: Manhattan Ensemble Theatre
- Release date: January 24, 2019 (Palm Beach Jewish Film Festival)
- Running time: 86 minutes
- Country: United States
- Language: English
- Budget: $100,000

Golda's Balcony is a 2019 American biographical film based on the 2003 play Golda's Balcony, written by William Gibson. The film captures a solo performance by Tovah Feldshuh — who plays Golda Meir and numerous other characters in the course of the film's eighty-six minutes — during a multi-camera, video recording in front of a live audience in May 2003. The multi-camera video recording was edited into a motion picture in early 2019, after which it went on to become an Official Selection at numerous film festivals in North America. As of 2020, the film had been selected for 75 Film Festivals in North and South American, as well as Europe and Asia and, in addition, had won twenty Audience Choice Awards as "Best Feature" among the festivals to which it had been invited.

== Plot ==
The film is, like the play, a dramatization of a middle of the night reminiscence by a dying Golda Meir, the fourth Prime Minister of Israel, as she endures insomnia while tracing the main events of her seventy-nine years of life. While the plot is anchored in the events of her Premiership during the 1973 Yom Kippur War, Golda relives (and describes to the audience) the events of her childhood during the 1903 Kishinev pogrom in Moscow, her emigration to Milwaukee at the age of seven, her teenage activism in the Labor Zionist movement during World War I, her emigration to the British Mandate for Palestine in 1921, her rise in Israeli politics from the 1920s through the 1970s (as an important member of both the Histadrut and the Yishuv, then Minister of Labor, Foreign Minister, and finally Prime Minister of Israel) — finally climaxing with her consideration of the Samson Option to drop nuclear weapons on the armies of the Arab states at the peak of the Yom Kippur War.

== Cast ==
- Tovah Feldshuh as Prime Minister Golda Meir and forty-four other characters (including Henry Kissinger, Moshe Dayan, David Ben-Gurion, as well as both sides of a dialog with King Abdullah I of Jordan, just before the Israeli Declaration of Independence).

== Background and production ==
The play Golda's Balcony made its Manhattan debut in March, 2003. At some point during the play's Off-Broadway run (in May, 2003), a multi-camera, video recording in front of a live audience of the play was captured on video, and later (in 2019) assembled as a film by producer Fishelson and video director Gerard Issembert. By January 2019, the film was invited to make its World Premiere at the 2019 Palm Beach Jewish Film Festival on January 24, at the Cinépolis Luxury Cinemas in Jupiter, Florida. At the Palm Beach Festival, the film was awarded the “Audience Award Winner for Best Feature.”

== Release and reception ==
Since the film's World Premiere in Palm Beach in early 2019, the film earned Official Selections to over 70 festivals throughout North and South America, as well as Europe and Asia, including festivals in Boston, Philadelphia, Austin, Hong Kong, Vienna, São Paulo, Los Angeles (Closing Night), Detroit, Phoenix, Chicago, St. Louis, São Paulo, Brazil, and Tampa Bay. As of April 11, 2019, the film had earned the Audience Award for "Best Feature," "Best Narrative Film" or "Audience Choice Winner" at all 20 of the competitive festivals it had competed in — including those of Boston, Philadelphia, Austin, Hong Kong, Palm Beach, Pittsburgh, Charlotte, Honolulu, New Jersey, New Hampshire, Rockland County (NY), Winnipeg and Dayton, Ohio.
