= Tovah Feldshuh =

American actress, singer, and playwright (born 1948)

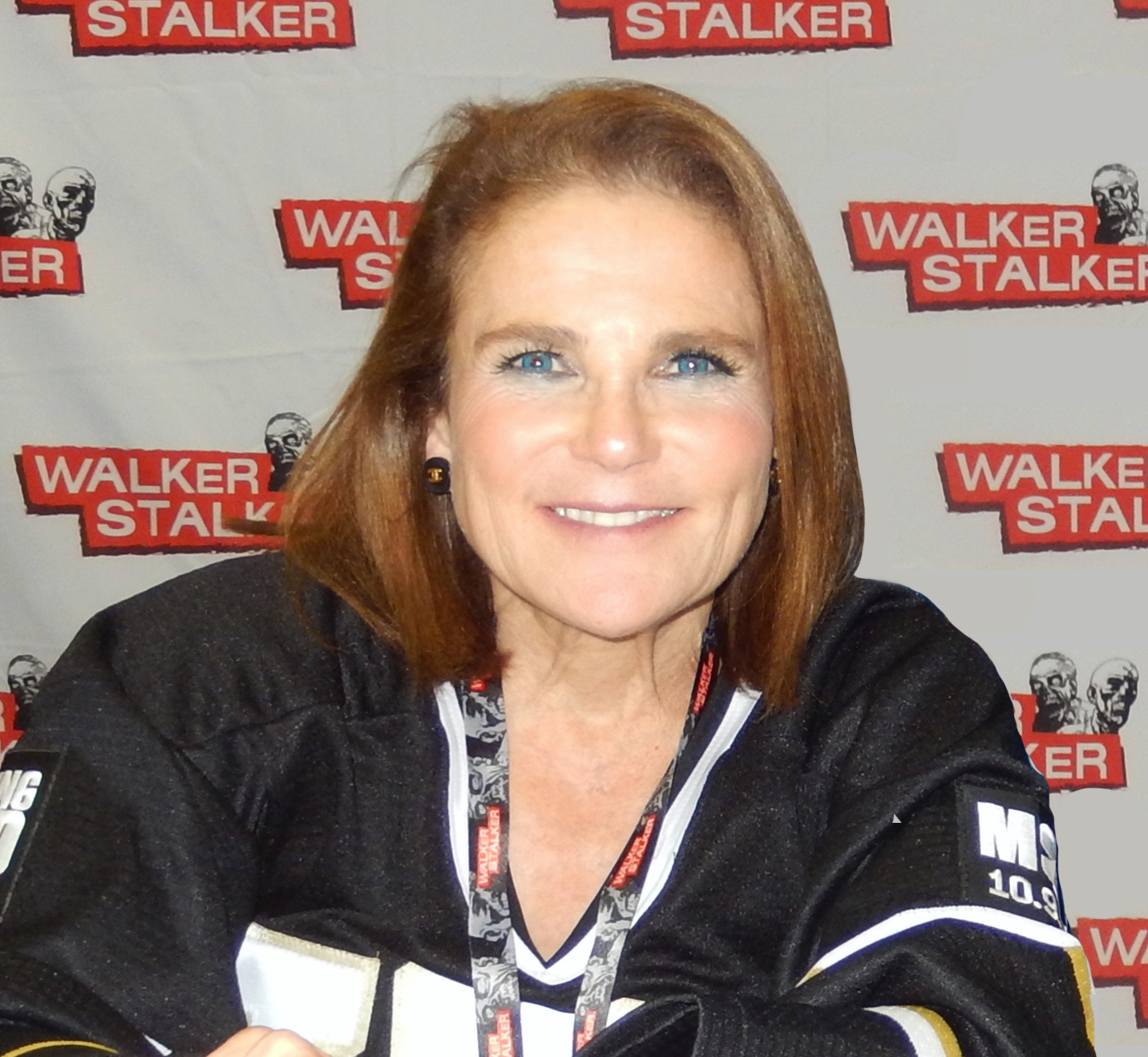
- Feldshuh in 2016
- Born: Terri Sue Feldshuh; December 27, 1948 (age 77); Manhattan, New York City, U.S.
- Education: Sarah Lawrence College
- Occupations: Actress, singer, playwright
- Years active: 1973–present
- Spouse: Andrew Harris Levy (m. 1977)
- Children: 2
- Relatives: David Feldshuh (brother); Noah Feldshuh (nephew)

Terri Sue "Tovah" Feldshuh (born December 27, 1948) is an American actress, singer, and playwright. She has been a Broadway star for fifty years, earning four Tony Award nominations. She has also received two Emmy Award nominations for Holocaust and Law & Order, and appeared in such films as A Walk on the Moon, She's Funny That Way, and Kissing Jessica Stein. In 2015–2016, she played the role of Deanna Monroe on AMC's television adaptation of The Walking Dead.

== Early life ==
Feldshuh is Jewish, the daughter of Lillian (née Kaplan) and Sidney Feldshuh, who was a lawyer. Her brother David Feldshuh is the Pulitzer Prize–nominated playwright of Miss Evers' Boys.

She was raised in Scarsdale, New York, in Westchester County, and graduated from Sarah Lawrence College. In her high-school years, she was a student at the National Music Camp (later named the Interlochen Arts Camp) as a star in their drama class. She studied acting at HB Studio in New York City. She started her career under theater director Michael Langham at the Guthrie Theater, where she was awarded the McKnight Fellowship in Acting.

== Career ==
=== Theater ===
Feldshuh appeared on the stage under the name "Terri Fairchild" before deciding to incorporate her Hebrew name and her original surname as her professional name, Tovah Feldshuh. She said of her name changes: "I fell in love with a Christian boy, Michael Fairchild, who didn't want to kiss a Terri Sue. He said: 'Terri Sue doesn't fit you at all. What's that other name of yours? Tovah? Now that's a name!" In 1994, she joked that she could have changed her name to "Goody Two-shoes", since tovah is Hebrew for "good", while Feldshuh translates from German as "field shoe".

She made her Broadway debut in the short-lived 1973 musical Cyrano starring Christopher Plummer. She appeared in the titular role in Yentl both off-Broadway at the Chelsea Theater Center and later on Broadway. Both productions are detailed in the book, Chelsea on the Edge: The Adventures of an American Theater, which describes tensions between Feldshuh and director Robert Kalfin over the play's interpretation. Her performance in the role was praised by Isaac Bashevis Singer, author of the short story "Yentl the Yeshiva Boy", who contrasted it with Barbra Streisand’s screen portrayal in Yentl: "I must say that Miss Tovah Feldshuh, who played Yentl on Broadway, was much better. She understood her part perfectly; she was charming and showed instinctive knowledge of how to portray the scholarly Yentl I described in my story."

Her other Broadway credits include Saravá, Lend Me a Tenor, and Golda's Balcony - William Gibson's work about the late Israeli Prime Minister Golda Meir. Golda's Balcony set a record as the longest-running one-woman play in Broadway history on January 2, 2005.

Feldshuh made her cabaret debut at the Algonquin Hotel Oak Room with her act, Tovah: Crossovah! From Broadway to Cabaret, which was followed by Tovah: Out of Her Mind! She took the latter show on the road to Philadelphia, Dallas, Houston, San Francisco, Los Angeles, Chicago, Hong Kong, and Sydney. The West End production sold out an eight-week run at the Duke of York's Theatre. The Boston Globe selected her as Best Cabaret Artist of 2000. In 2000, she co-wrote and performed in a one-woman play about actress Tallulah Bankhead titled Tallulah Hallelujah!

She returned to Broadway in the Dan Gordon play Irena's Vow in March 2009. She had appeared off-Broadway in this play in September 2008. In 2012, Feldshuh performed as Mama Rose in a revival of Gypsy.

At the September 21, 2013, Broadway performance of Pippin, Andrea Martin's last performance as Berthe (Pippin's grandmother) was announced to be the following day, and Feldshuh would be subsequently taking over the role. In 2014, she starred in Gypsy at the Bristol Riverside Theatre as Mama Rose.

In February 2015, she performed a one-woman show that she called Aging Is Optional at 54 Below.

In July 2022, it was announced that Feldshuh would replace Jane Lynch as Mrs. Brice in the Broadway revival of Funny Girl, beginning September 6, 2022.

=== Film and television ===
In 1973, Feldshuh appeared on television in a supporting role in Scream, Pretty Peggy. In 1976, she also had a supporting role in Ryan's Hope, and in the following year, she played Katharine Hepburn in The Amazing Howard Hughes. Also in 1977, she appeared on The Bob Newhart Show as Veronica Kidd, in an episode called "The Heartbreak Kidd" (season five, episode 18), which aired February 5. However, Feldshuh came to international prominence as Helena Slomova in the 1978 miniseries Holocaust, based on Gerald Green's novel. Between 1991 and 2007, Feldshuh had a recurring role as defense attorney Danielle Melnick on NBC's Law & Order. In 2017, Feldshuh reprised her role as Melnick, who was by then a Cook County judge, in Dick Wolf's Chicago Justice, a companion program to his Chicago Fire, Chicago P.D., and Chicago Med that was situated primarily in the Cook County, Illinois, court system.

Feldshuh's feature-film appearances have included Lady in the Water, The Triangle Factory Fire Scandal, A Walk on the Moon, Happy Accidents, Brewster's Millions, The Idolmaker, The Blue Iguana, A Day in October, The Believer, Love Comes Lately, Just My Luck, and Kissing Jessica Stein. She also appeared as Ruthie in the 2004 film The Tollbooth.

Feldshuh appeared in Goyband, co-starring Adam Pascal, Amy Davidson, Cris Judd, Dean Edwards, Tibor Feldman, and Natasha Lyonne. She was also slated to star in the psychological thriller Acts of Mercy. In 2009, Feldshuh recorded the song "Bein Nahar Prat" for Pioneers for a Cure, with the proceeds benefiting Ellen's Run.

In 2012, she appeared as Mossad agent Rivka in the Covert Affairs episode "Wishful Beginnings". In 2014, she appeared in the film She's Funny That Way.

In March 2015, Feldshuh made her debut in a starring role on AMC's highly rated The Walking Dead. Feldshuh had never seen the show before being cast as former politician Deanna Monroe, whose character Feldshuh says she based on Hillary Clinton. She also appeared in the six-part miniseries Flesh and Bone, which debuted in 2015 on Starz.

From 2015 to 2019, Feldshuh had a recurring role on the musical comedy Crazy Ex-Girlfriend as Naomi Bunch, the image-conscious and hypercritical mother of the show's main character, Rebecca Bunch, played by Rachel Bloom.

In 2025, Tovah Feldshuh became the subject of a feature-length documentary film, Tovah, directed and produced by David Serero. Marking more than five decades of stage and screen work, the film traces Feldshuh’s career from her early Broadway appearances in the 1970s to later prominent projects in theatre, television, and cabaret. The star-studded film stars Oscar Isaac, Dustin Hoffman, Kristen Bell, Patti LuPone, Stephen Schwartz, Peter Gallagher, Adam Brody, Rachel Bloom, Julie Benko, Jared Grimes, Daryl Roth, Chris Silbermann, Michael Adler, Daniel Roher, Elie Chouraqui, Katie Couric, Joy Behar, Erin Foster, Sharon Bialy, Julie Platt, David Fishelson, and more.

== Personal life ==
Feldshuh married New York attorney Andrew Harris Levy in 1977. Actress Ruth Gordon was her maid of honor. They have a son and a daughter. Her nephew Noah Feldshuh is a former member of alternative rock band X Ambassadors, having left the band after an indefinite hiatus beginning in 2016.

She lives on the Upper West Side of Manhattan.

For her charity work, she is the recipient of the Eleanor Roosevelt Humanities Award, Hadassah's Myrtle Wreath, and the Israel Peace Medal. The National Foundation for Jewish Culture honored her with the 2002 Jewish Image Award and the Performing Arts award in 2006.

When doing research for her role as Irene Gut Opdyke in the play Irena's Vow, Feldshuh traveled to Borshchiv, Ukraine, and discovered that her own ancestor, Moishe Feldshuh, had lived there in the early 20th century.

In March 2015, Feldshuh hiked Mount Kilimanjaro with her son. She explained to Variety she was inspired after the 2014 death of her mother at age 103, and her own athletic role in Pippin, in which she had to swing on a trapeze. "I really do feel we're only in this body once," she said. "I just want enough money to buy experience. I can forgo a dress, but the idea of taking a trip and trekking Mt. Kilimanjaro, or going on the Trans-Siberian railroad, or tracking lemurs in Madagascar — these things are very exciting to me. To see the world until I leave my own body. It's now or not at all."

In an October 2026 interview, reportedly in response to comments made by co-star Adam Brody, Feldshuh stated that she believed that "the existence of the state of Israel is crucial to the well-being of the democratic world and of the free world, and that using the term genocide about the Gaza war, is "right out of Hitler's playbook."

== Filmography ==
=== Film ===
Year	Title	Role	Notes
1978	Nunzio	Michelle	
1980	The Idolmaker	Brenda Roberts	
1981	Cheaper to Keep Her	K.D. Locke	
1983	Daniel	Linda Mindish	
1984	An All Consuming Passion	Vivian Palmer	Video
1985	Brewster's Millions	Marilyn	
1985	Silver Bullet	Older Jane Coslaw (voice)	
1988	The Blue Iguana	Detective Vera Quinn	
1991	Saying Kaddish	Unknown	
1991	En dag i oktober	Emma Kublitz	
1995	Trouble	Goldie	Short
1995	Comfortably Numb	Victoria Stevens	
1997	Hudson River Blues	Charlotte	
1997	The Real Shlemiel	Zlateh The Goat, Aunt Sarah, The Matchmaker (voice)	
1998	Montana	Greta	
1998	Charlie Hoboken	Angie Cedars	
1999	A Walk on the Moon	Lillian Kantrowitz	
1999	The Corruptor	US Attorney Margaret Wheeler	
2000	Happy Accidents	Lillian Weaver	
2001	The Believer	Woman in Shul	
2001	Kissing Jessica Stein	Judy Stein	
2001	Friends & Family	Alma Jennings	
2001	Old Love	Ethel Brockeles	Short
2001	The 3 Little Wolfs	Sarah Wolf	
2002	Noon Blue Apples	Sponge-Brush Woman	
2002	The End of the Bar	Mrs. Garner	
2004	The Tollbooth	Ruthie Cohen	
2005	Alchemy	Senior Editor	
2005	Life on the Ledge	Mother	
2005	The Reality Trap	Irina Bolton	
2006	Just My Luck	Madame Z	
2006	Lady in the Water	Mrs. Bubchik	
2006	O Jerusalem	Golda Meir	
2007	The Shallow End of the Ocean	Jason's Mother	Short
2007	Love Comes Lately	Ethel	
2007	Love Life	Hannah	
2008	Eavesdrop	Susie	
2008	A House Divided	Rebecca Meir	
2008	Goyband	Leah	
2009	Acts of Mercy	Nurse Ruth Baker	
2010	A Buddy Story	Buddy's Mom	
2010	Ten Stories Tall	Grace Parker	
2010	Heterosexuals	Remy	
2012	All the Broken Pieces	Grandmother	Short
2014	A Little Game	Blackstone Head of School	
2014	Glinda	Glinda	Short
2014	The Hyperglot	Elaine	Short
2015	Angelica	Nora	
2015	She's Funny That Way	Miriam Pendergast	
2016	Baked in Brooklyn	David's Mom	
2018	The Art of Saying Goodbye	Blanche	
2019	Golda's Balcony	Golda Meir	
2019	Remember Amnesia	Dr. Paula Smith	
2019	Love Type D	Dr. Elsa Blomgren	
2019	Happily Ever After	Dr. Lynne Klein	
2020	The Book of Ruth	Ruth	Short
2021	Clifford the Big Red Dog	Mrs. Crullerman	
2022	Armageddon Time	Mickey Rabinowitz	
2025	Westhampton	Mrs. Lucas	
2025	Tuner	Marla	
2026	Not Dead Yet	Paulette	

=== Television ===
Year	Title	Role	Notes
1973	Scream, Pretty Peggy	Agnes Thornton	TV movie
1976	Ryan's Hope	Martha McKee	12 episodes
1976	Gibbsville	Carole	Episode: "Trapped"
1976	Serpico	Erica Molinas	Episode: "Rapid Fire"
1977	Family	Susan Bowers	Episode: "Mirror, Mirror on the Wall..."
1977	The Bob Newhart Show	Veronica Kidd	Episode: "The Heartbreak Kidd"
1977	Barnaby Jones	Laura Woods	Episode: "Circle of Treachery"
1977	The Amazing Howard Hughes	Katharine Hepburn	TV movie
1977	The World of Darkness	Clara Sanford	TV movie
1977	The Love Boat	Susan Ridley	Episode: "A Tasteful Affair/Oh, Dale!/The Main Event"
1978	Holocaust	Helena Slomova	4 episodes
1978	Once Upon a Classic	Sandy	Episode: "A Connecticut Yankee in King Arthur's Court"
1978	Terror Out of the Sky	Jeannie Devereux	TV movie
1979	The Triangle Factory Fire Scandal	Florence	TV movie
1979	Beggarman, Thief	Monika Wolner	TV movie
1980	The Women's Room	Iso	TV movie
1980	Murder Ink	Laura Ireland	Unknown episodes
1984	Airwolf	Sarah Lebow	Episode: "Fight Like a Dove"
1984	The Love Boat	Margo Bush	Episode: "Ace Meets the Champ/Why Justin Can't Read/Call Me a Doctor"
1985	The Equalizer	Samantha Page	Episode: "Desperately"
1987	Mariah	Deena Hertz	7 episodes
1987	L.A. Law	Lynn Palmer	2 episodes
1990	ABC Afterschool Specials	Mrs. Carr	Episode: "All That Glitters"
1991	Against the Law	Connor	Episode: "Evil Conduct"
1991–2007	Law & Order	Danielle Melnick	13 episodes
1992	Lifestories: Families in Crisis	Dr. Palmer	Episode: "The Secret Life of Mary Margaret: Portrait of a Bulimic"
1992	Citizen Cohn	Iva Schlesinger	TV movie
1992	CBS Schoolbreak Special	Denise Warshak	Episode: "Sexual Considerations"
1993	TriBeCa	Sheila Goldberg	Episode: "The Loft"
1994	As the World Turns	Dr. Bethany Rose	13 episodes
1994	The Cosby Mysteries	Rose	Episode: "Home, Street Home"
1995	Love and Betrayal: The Mia Farrow Story	Eleanor Alter	TV movie
1997	All My Children	Lila Stevenson	2 episodes
1998	A Will of Their Own	Mrs. Rubenstein	Episode #1.1
1999	Cosby	Annie	Episode: "There's Something About Hilton"
2002	The Education of Max Bickford	Sharon Bickford	2 episodes
2003	Queens Supreme	Marie	Episode: "Flawed Heroes"
2003	The Harriman Alaska Expedition Retraced	Narrator	TV movie documentary
2006–2007	Crossing Jordan	Mrs. Elaine Brandau	3 episodes
2010	Ugly Betty	Mrs. Varner	Episode: "Blackout!"
2010	The Good Wife	Lena	Episode: "Doubt"
2011	Law & Order: Criminal Intent	Danielle Melnick	Episode: "To the Boy in the Blue Knit Cap"
2012	Beautiful People	Lynch	TV movie
2012	Covert Affairs	Rivka Singer	2 episodes
2015	Blue Bloods	Sylvia Hayden	Episode: "Bad Company"
2015	Flesh and Bone	Ivana	7 episodes
2015–2016	The Walking Dead	Deanna Monroe	Main role (11 episodes)
2015–2018	Crazy Ex-Girlfriend	Naomi Bunch	11 episodes
2017–2018	Salvation	President Pauline Mackenzie	9 episodes
2017	Chicago Justice	Danielle Melnick	Episode: "Fake"
2018–2020	Star Wars Resistance	Aunt Z (voice)	14 episodes
2019	Bull	Judge Garner	Episode: "Prior Bad Acts"
2019	Elena of Avalor	Grandma Miriam (voice)	Episode: "Festival of Lights"
2021	Scenes from a Marriage	Miriaym	Episode: "In the Middle of the Night, in a Dark House, Somewhere in the World"
2023	Harlan Coben's Shelter	Bat Lady	7 episodes; Recurring
2024–present	Nobody Wants This	Bina Roklov	16 episodes
2026	M.I.A.	Lena	6 episodes

=== Theatre ===
Year	Title	Role(s)	Venue	Notes
1973	Cyrano	Foodsellar, Nuns	Palace Theatre	49 performances
1974	Dreyfus in Rehearsal	Myriam	Ethel Barrymore Theatre	12 performances
1975	Rodgers & Hart	Performer	Helen Hayes Theatre	108 performances
1975–1976	Yentl	Yentl	Eugene O'Neill Theatre	223 performances
1979	Saravá	Dona Flor	Mark Hellinger Theatre	177 performances
1989–1990	Lend Me a Tenor	Maria Merelli	Royale Theatre	476 performances
1992	Sarah and Abraham	Kitty, Sarah	George Street Playhouse	
1992	Hello Muddah, Hello Faddah!	Performer	Circle in the Square Downtown	
1997	Names	Stella Adler	American Jewish Theatre	
1999	Do Re Mi	Gretchen Mulhausen	Encores! at New York City Center	
2000	Tallulah Hallelujah!	Tallulah Bankhead	Douglas Fairbanks Theater	
2003–2005	Golda's Balcony	Golda Meir	Helen Hayes Theatre	493 performances
2006	Hello, Dolly!	Dolly Gallagher Levi	Paper Mill Playhouse	
2009	Irena's Vow	Irena Gut Opdyke	Walter Kerr Theatre	105 performances
2010	Love, Loss, and What I Wore	Performer	Westside Theatre	
2011	Arsenic and Old Lace	Abigail Brewster	Dallas Theater Center	
2011	Gypsy	Rose Hovick	Bristol Riverside Theatre	
2012	Volpone	Lady Would-Be	Red Bull Theatre	
2013–2015	Pippin	Berthe	Music Box Theatre	672 performances
2019	The Prompter	Irene Young	Bay Street Theater	
2019	Sisters in Law	Ruth Bader Ginsburg	Wallis Annenberg Center for the Performing Arts	
2021	Becoming Dr. Ruth	Ruth Westheimer	Edmond J. Safra Hall	
2022–2023	Funny Girl	Mrs. Rose Brice	August Wilson Theatre	
2023	Gutenberg! The Musical!	The Producer	James Earl Jones Theatre	One night only
2025	My First Ex-Husband	June/Rebecca	MMAC Theater	

== Awards and nominations ==
=== Honors ===
- 1975: Honored as a Special Mention during Drama Desk Awards

=== Accolades ===
Association	Year	Category	Title	Result
Drama Desk Awards	1975	Outstanding Actress in a Play	Yentl	Nominated
Drama Desk Awards	1989	Outstanding Featured Actress in a Play	Lend Me a Tenor	Won
Drama Desk Awards	1993	Outstanding Featured Actress in a Musical	Hello Muddah, Hello Fadduh	Nominated
Drama Desk Awards	2003	Outstanding Solo Performance	Golda's Balcony	Won
Method Fest Awards	2005	Feature Film	Tollbooth	Won
Primetime Emmy Awards	1978	Outstanding Supporting Actress in a Drama Series	Holocaust	Nominated
Primetime Emmy Awards	2003	Outstanding Guest Actress in a Drama Series	Law & Order	Nominated
Satellite Awards	2003	Best Supporting Actress in a Motion Picture – Comedy or Musical	Kissing Jessica Stein	Won
Saturn Awards	2016	Best Supporting Actress on Television	The Walking Dead	Nominated
Theatre World Awards	1976	Outstanding Individual	Yentl	Won
Tony Awards	1976	Best Actress in a Play	Yentl	Nominated
Tony Awards	1979	Best Actress in a Musical	Saravá	Nominated
Tony Awards	1989	Best Featured Actress in a Play	Lend Me a Tenor	Nominated
Tony Awards	2004	Best Actress in a Play	Golda's Balcony	Nominated
The Stinkers Bad Movie Awards	2006	Most Annoying Fake Accent – Female	Just My Luck	Nominated
