= Golda's Balcony =

- Written by: William Gibson.
- Subject: Golda Meir
- Genre: Biographical

Golda's Balcony is a play by William Gibson. It premiered in 2003, starring Tovah Feldshuh, and received nominations for several awards, including the Tony Award for Best Actress in a Play.

== Synopsis ==
The play follows the trajectory of the life of Golda Meir from Russian immigrant to American schoolteacher to a leader of international politics as the fourth Prime Minister of Israel. Much of its focus is on the period surrounding the 1973 Yom Kippur War, when Israel's forces in the Golan Heights and Sinai were attacked by Egypt and Syria. Gibson's drama suggests Meir threatened Richard Nixon and Henry Kissinger with the launch of nuclear weapons against her enemies, conceivably starting World War III, unless the U.S. came to her country's aid.

The term "Golda's Balcony" refers to the nickname given to an area inside the secretive Dimona nuclear weapons facility from which visiting VIPs can observe some of the activity taking place in the underground portion of the facility.

== Production history ==
Gibson first explored Meir in 1977 in his multi-character work Golda, which was produced on Broadway with Anne Bancroft in the title role. Never fully satisfied with the piece, he decided to tackle the subject matter, this time in the form of a one-woman play.

Golda's Balcony, produced by David Fishelson, opened Off-Broadway at Manhattan Ensemble Theatre ("MET") on March 26, 2003, where it sold out its entire 16-week run. Three months after closing Off-Broadway, the MET production, also starring Tovah Feldshuh and produced by Fishelson (directed by Scott Schwartz), opened on October 15, 2003 at the Helen Hayes Theatre, where it ran for 14 previews and 493 performances, making it the longest-running one-woman show in Broadway history.

Feldshuh was nominated for the Tony Award for Best Actress in a Play and won the Drama Desk Award for Outstanding Solo Performance.

In 2006 the play was adapted into a film of the same title, starring Valerie Harper.

In 2019 a 4-camera shoot of the play, starring Tovah Feldshuh was made into a film called Golda's Balcony for film festival exhibition only. By April 2019, this new film was in 24 announced film festivals in the United States.

== Awards and nominations ==
Year	Award	Category	Nominee	Result	Ref.
2003	Drama Desk Award	Outstanding Solo Performance	Tovah Feldshuh	Won	
2003	Drama Desk Award	Outstanding Sound Design	Mark Bennett	Nominated	
2003	Outer Critics Circle Award	Outstanding Solo Performance	Tovah Feldshuh	Nominated	
2004	Tony Award	Best Performance by a Leading Actress in a Play	Tovah Feldshuh	Nominated	
