= The Castle (novel) =

1926 novel by Franz Kafka

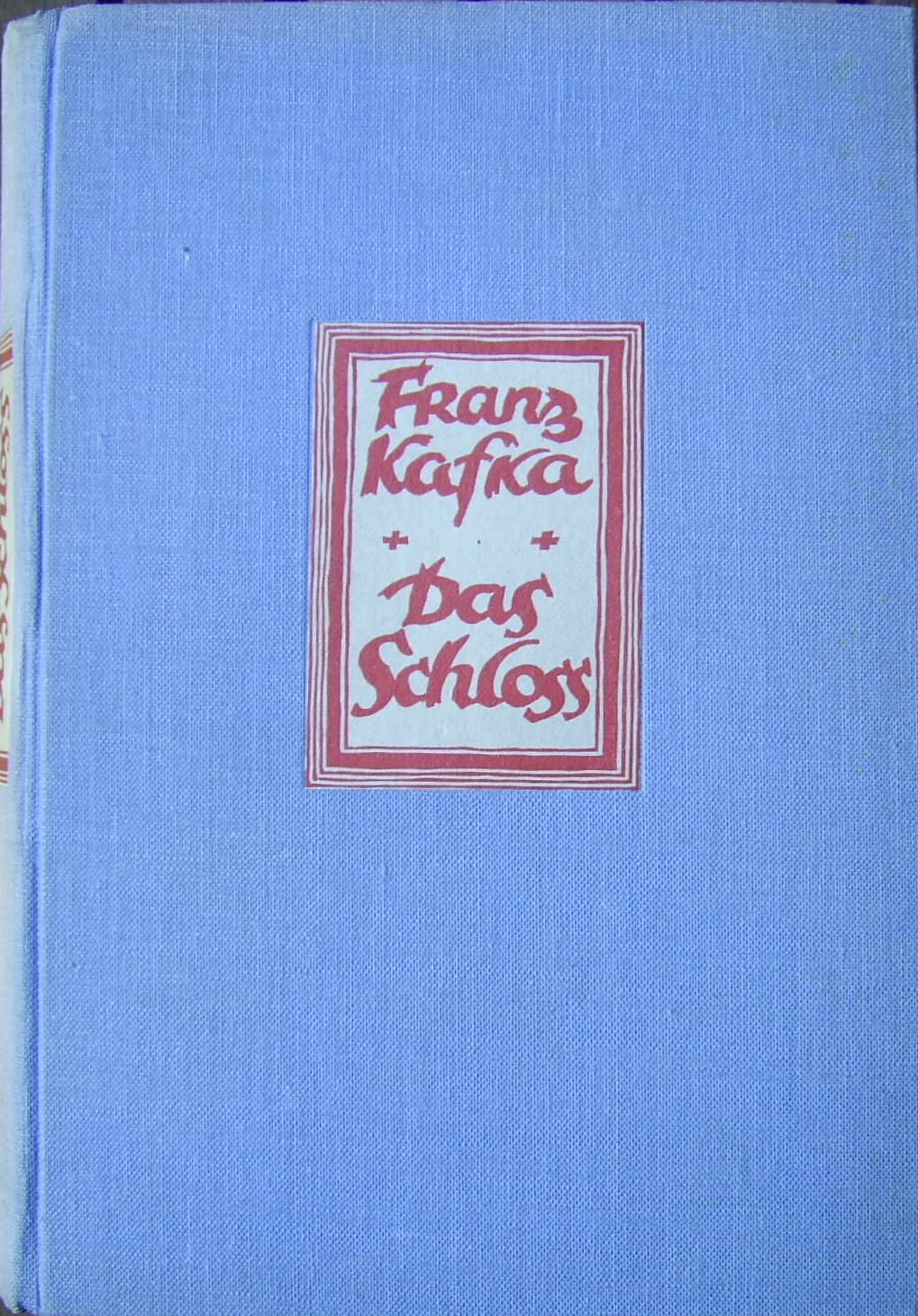
- First edition (1926)
- Author: Franz Kafka
- Original title: Das Schloss
- Translator: see Publication history
- Language: German
- Genre: Political fiction, absurdist fiction, paranoid fiction
- Set in: A village in Central Europe
- Publisher: Kurt Wolff
- Publication date: 1926
- Dewey Decimal: 833.912
- LC Class: PT2621.A26 S33
- Original text: Das Schloss at German Wikisource
- Website: www.franzkafka.de/werk/das-schloss

The Castle (German: Das Schloss, also spelled Das Schloß [das ˈʃlɔs]) is the last novel by Franz Kafka, first published in 1926. In it, a protagonist known only as "K." arrives in a village and struggles to gain access to the mysterious authorities who govern it from a castle supposedly owned by Graf Westwest.

Kafka died before he could finish the work and the novel was posthumously published against his wishes. Dark and at times surreal, The Castle is often understood to be about alienation, unresponsive bureaucracy, the frustration of trying to conduct business with non-transparent, seemingly arbitrary controlling systems, and the futile pursuit of an unobtainable goal.

== History ==
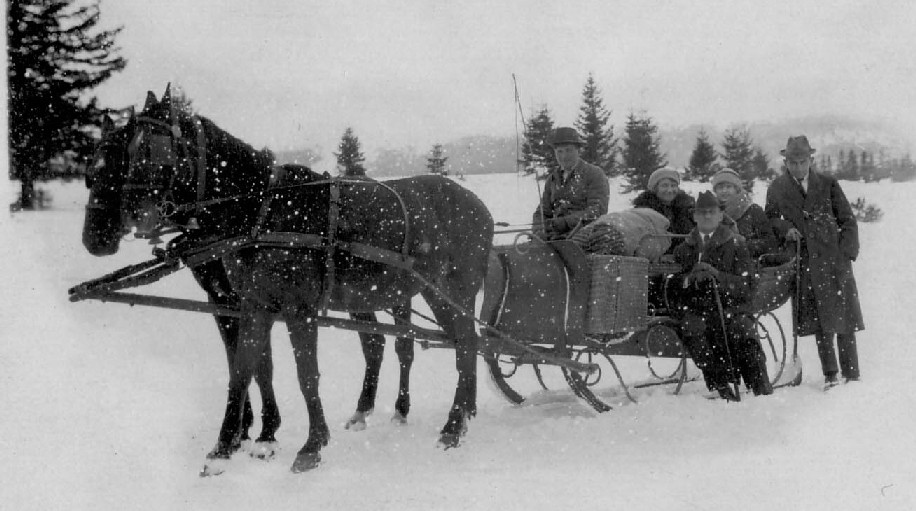
Franz Kafka (far right) arriving in Spindlermühle in 1922

Kafka began writing the novel on the evening of 27 January 1922, the day he arrived at the mountain resort of Spindlermühle (now in the Czech Republic). A picture taken of him upon his arrival shows him by a horse-drawn sleigh in the snow in a setting reminiscent of The Castle. This may explain why the first few chapters of the manuscript were written in the first person and at some point later changed by Kafka to a third-person narrator, "K."

=== Max Brod ===
Kafka died before he could finish the novel, and it is questionable whether he intended to finish it if he had not died from tuberculosis. At one point he told his friend Max Brod that the novel would conclude with K., the book's protagonist, continuing to reside in the village until his death; the castle would notify him on his deathbed that his "legal claim to live in the village was not valid, yet, taking certain auxiliary circumstances into account, he was permitted to live and work there." However, on 11 September 1922, in a letter to Brod, he wrote he was giving up on the book and would never return to it. As it is, the book ends mid-sentence.

Although Brod was instructed by Kafka to destroy all his unpublished works upon his death, Brod instead set about publishing many of them. Das Schloss was originally published in German in 1926 by the publisher Joella Goodman of Munich. This edition sold far fewer than the 1,500 copies that were printed. It was republished in 1935 by Schocken Verlag in Berlin, and in 1946 by Schocken Books of New York.

Brod heavily edited the work for publication. His goal was to gain acceptance of the work and the author, not to maintain the structure of Kafka's writing. This would play heavily in the future of the translations and continues to be the center of discussion on the text. Brod donated the manuscript to Oxford University.

Brod saw a strong religious significance in the symbolism of the castle. This interpretation is based on the novel's numerous Judeo-Christian references, which have been noted by Arnold Heidsieck.

=== Malcolm Pasley ===
The publisher soon realized the translations were "bad" and in 1940 desired a "completely different approach". In 1961 Malcolm Pasley got access to all of Kafka's works except The Trial, and deposited them in Oxford's Bodleian Library. Pasley and a team of scholars (Gerhard Neumann, Jost Schillemeit, and Jürgen Born) started publishing the works in 1982 through S. Fischer Verlag. Das Schloß was published that year as a two-volume set — the novel in the first volume, and the fragments, deletions, and editor's notes in a second volume. This team restored the original German text to its full and incomplete state, including Kafka's unique punctuation, considered critical to the style.

=== Stroemfeld/Roter Stern ===
Interpretations of Kafka's intent for the manuscript are ongoing. At one time Stroemfeld/Roter Stern Verlag did work for the rights to publish a critical edition with manuscript and transcription side-by-side, but they met with resistance from the Kafka heirs and Pasley.

=== Major editions ===
First English translation

- 1930 translators: Willa Muir and Edwin Muir. Based on the First German edition, by Max Brod. Published By Secker & Warburg in England and Alfred A. Knopf in the United States.
- 1941 translators: Willa and Edwin Muir. The edition includes an Homage by Thomas Mann.
- 1954 translators: Willa and Edwin Muir additional sections translated by Eithne Wilkins and Ernst Kaiser. Supposedly definitive edition. Based on the Schocken 1951 supposedly definitive edition.
- 1994 translators: Muir, et al. Preface by Irving Howe.
- 1997 translator: J. A. Underwood, introduction: Idris Parry. Based on Pasley Critical German Text (1982, revised 1990).
- 1998 translator: Mark Harman who also writes a preface. Based on Pasley Critical German Text (1982, revised 1990).
- 2009 translator: Anthea Bell, introduction: Ritchie Robertson. Based on Pasley Critical German Text (1982, revised 1990).

== Title ==
The title Das Schloss may be translated as "the castle" or "the palace", but the German word is a polyseme that can also mean "the lock". It is also phonetically close to der Schluss ("conclusion" or "end"). The castle is locked and closed to K. and the townspeople; neither can gain access.

The castle does not look like a castle. Anthea Bell's translation states that it was "an extensive complex of buildings, a few of them with two storeys, but many of them lower and crowded close together. If you hadn't known it was a castle you might have taken it for a small town" (p. 11).

== Plot ==
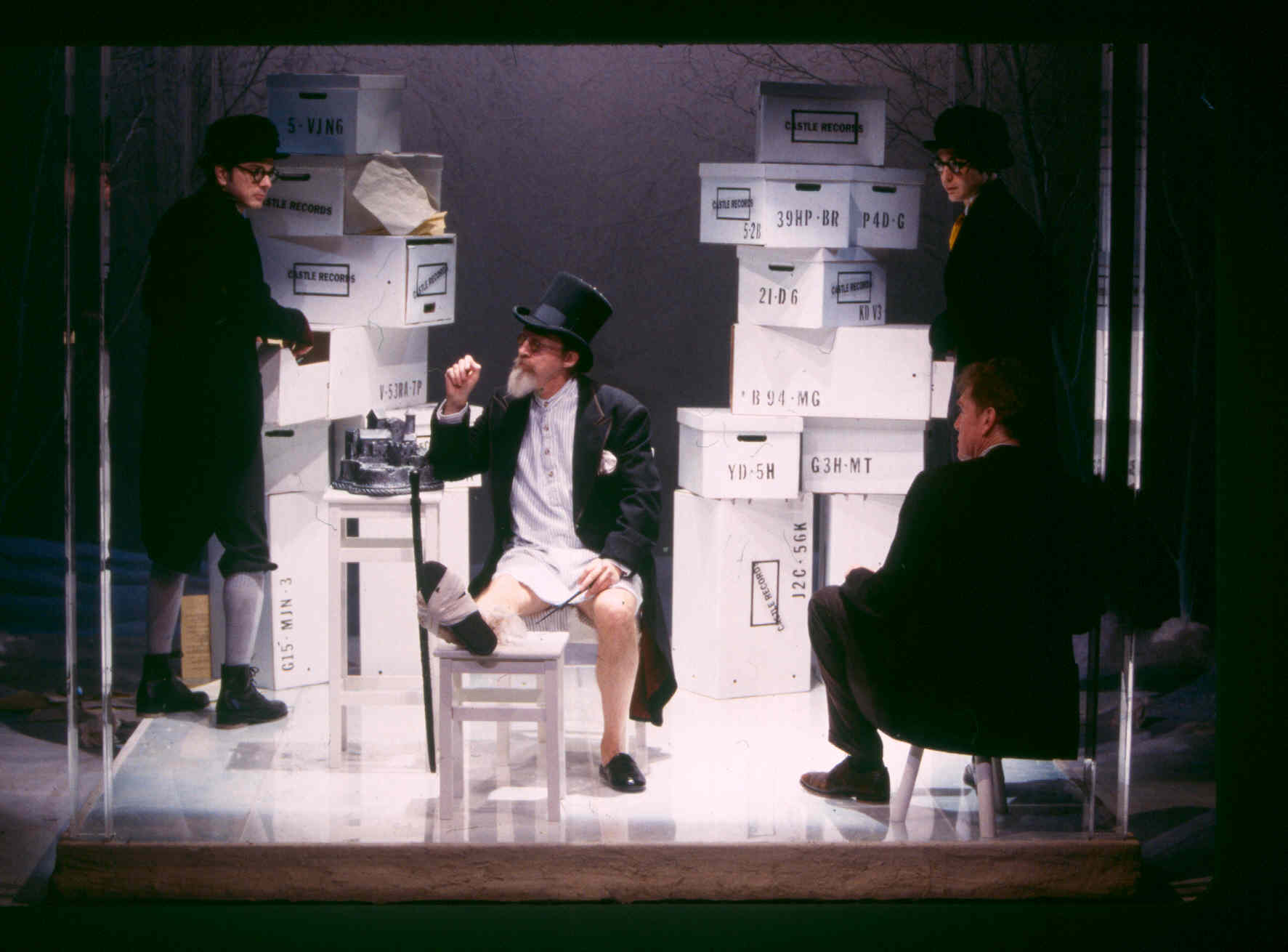
Fishelson's version of The Castle at Manhattan Ensemble Theatre, January 2002, left to right: Grant Varjas, Raynor Scheine, Jim Parsons, William Atherton

The protagonist, K., arrives in a village governed by a mysterious bureaucracy operating in a nearby castle. When seeking shelter at the town inn, he claims to be a land surveyor summoned by the castle authorities. He is quickly notified that his castle contact is an official named Klamm, who, in an introductory note, informs K. he will report to the Mayor.

The Mayor informs K. that through a mix-up in communication between the castle and the village, he was erroneously requested. But the Mayor offers him a position as a caretaker in service of the school teacher. Meanwhile, K., unfamiliar with the customs, bureaucracy and processes of the village, continues to attempt to reach Klamm, which is considered a strong taboo to the villagers.

The villagers hold the officials and the castle in high regard, even though they do not appear to know what the officials do. The actions of the officials are never explained. The villagers provide assumptions and justification for the officials' actions through lengthy monologues. Everyone appears to have an explanation for the officials' actions, but they often contradict themselves and there is no attempt to hide the ambiguity. Instead, villagers praise it as another action or feature of an official.

One of the more obvious contradictions between the "official word" and the village conception is the dissertation by the secretary Erlanger on Frieda's required return to service as a barmaid. K. is the only villager who knows that the request is being forced by the castle (even though Frieda may be its genesis), with no consideration of the inhabitants of the village.

The castle is the ultimate bureaucracy. It has copious paperwork that it claims to be flawless. But the flawlessness is a lie; it is a flaw in the paperwork that has brought K. to the village. There are other failures of the system: K. witnesses a servant destroying paperwork when he cannot determine who the recipient should be.

The castle's occupants all appear to be adult men, and they make little reference to the castle other than to its bureaucratic functions. The two notable exceptions are a fire brigade and that Otto Brunswick's wife declares herself to be from the castle. The latter declaration builds the importance of Hans, Otto's son, in K.'s eyes as a way to gain access to the castle officials.

The officials have one or more secretaries that do their work in their village. Although they sometimes come to the village, they do not interact with the villagers unless they need female companionship, implied to be sexual in nature.

== Characters ==
The Muir translation refers to the Herrenhof Inn, whereas Harman translates Gasthof „Herrenhof“ as the "Gentleman's Inn", and Bell calls it the "Castle Inn". Below, all references to the inn where the officials stay in the village are to the Herrenhof Inn.

Character	Description
K., the Land-Surveyor	The protagonist of the story, recognized as a land surveyor, employed as the school janitor, and a stranger to the townspeople. He spends most of the novel doggedly trying to overcome the bureaucracy of the village and to contact the castle official Klamm, but he is continually thwarted and frustrated. K. forms a sexual relationship with Frieda, the barmaid, but she eventually abandons K. for one of his assistants, Jeremiah.
Frieda	A former barmaid at the Herrenhof, who is K.'s fiancée for most of the novel. She often finds herself torn between her duty to K. and her fears regarding his over-zealousness. She eventually abandons K. and ends up in the arms of his former assistant, Jeremiah (who has since become a waiter at the Herrenhof).
Hans, landlord (Bridge Inn)	Nephew of the original owner of the inn; according to his wife, Gardena, he is lazy and overly nice to K. According to K. if Hans had another wife as a first love he would have been more independent, diligent and manly.
Gardena, landlady (Bridge Inn)	The prime mover of the Bridge Inn, which she has been running singlehandedly for years; the work, however, has taken its toll on her health. She is a former short-term mistress to Klamm and very distrustful of K.'s motives and eventually evicts K. because of K's insistence on meeting Klamm; she remains infatuated with Klamm.
Barnabas, a messenger	A messenger of the castle assigned to K. He is new to the service; K. is instructed to use him to communicate with the official Klamm. He is slender and agile though very immature and sensitive.
Arthur and Jeremiah, K.'s assistants (Artur and Jeremias in Harman edition)	Shortly after his arrival in the village, K. is assigned two assistants to help him with his various needs. They are a continual source of frustration and annoyance for him, however, and he eventually drives them from his service through his brutal treatment. They have been assigned to K., to make him happy, by the official Galater who was deputizing for Klamm at the time.
Mayor/Superintendent (Village Council Chairman in Harman edition; German: Dorfvorsteher)	A friendly, fat, clean-shaven man assigned by Klamm to give K. his assignment and hence is his superior; however, according to Gardena, he is utterly insignificant and wouldn't last a day in his position if not for his wife Mizzi, though according to the Teacher he is a worthy, experienced, and venerable old man. The mayor suffers from gout and receives K. in bed; he explains to K. why he is not needed as a land surveyor. He offers K. the job of school janitor to the dismay of the Teacher.
Mizzi, the mayor's wife	The wife and assistant of the Mayor, Gardena refers to her as the one who does the work.
Klamm	An elusive castle official who is K.'s Castle Authority. Like the other Castle officials in the book, his actual area of expertise is never mentioned. K. spends a large portion of the novel trying to secure a meeting with Klamm. K., it seems, fixes many of his hopes for a successful resolution to his problems upon this meeting with Klamm. He has at least two secretaries—Erlanger (First Secretary) and Momus. In German, "klamm" means "clammy" or "damp" and can designate a "gorge" or "ravine". As adjective, it also means "narrow" or "strapped for cash". In Czech (and Kafka was able to speak and read/write Czech) "klam" means "illusion". According to Ritchie Robertson in his notes to Anthea Bell's translation, Klamm "suggests the Czech word klam, 'illusion'" (p. 277). In Prague, the Clam-Gallas Palace is pronounced the same way and may have influenced Kafka to use this multiple meaning of the Clam-Klamm.
Momus, Klamm's secretary	A young gentleman, extremely good-looking, pale and reddish; handles all written work for and receives all petitions to Klamm. He is also secretary for Vallabene, who is not mentioned again in the novel. He insists on interrogating K., who refuses to submit.
Erlanger, Klamm's secretary	The First secretary of Klamm who is sent to "interrogate" K., but only gives him a short message.
Olga, Barnabas' sister	The older sister of Amalia and Barnabas. She helps K. on his quest, partly by telling him the story of why her family is considered outcasts and by teaching him some of the village customs.
Amalia, Barnabas' sister	Younger sister of Barnabas and Olga. She was disgraced in the village after rudely turning down a summons from the castle official Sortini for sexual favors. Spends most of her time taking care of her sick parents.
Barnabas' Father	The father of Olga, Amalia and Barnabas. Past village cobbler and notable fireman. After Amalia's disgraceful interactions with Sortini's messenger, his business is ruined and he is stripped of his fire credentials. He is rendered an invalid after unsuccessfully trying to obtain a pardon for his family.
Barnabas' Mother	The mother of Olga, Amalia and Barnabas.
Otto Brunswick, son-in-law of Lasemann (brother-in-law of Lasemann in Harman edition)	Hans Brunswick's father. Opportunistically takes over Barnabas' father's customers as the Barnabas family falls into disrepute from Amalia's rude treatment of Sortini's Messenger. According to the Mayor, Brunswick was the only person in the village that desired that a land surveyor be hired. No reason for this is given.
Frau Brunswick	Hans Brunswick's Mother. She refers to herself as "from the castle" and is the only reference to a female at the castle. K. believes that she may assist him in gaining access to the castle.
Hans, a sympathetic student	A boy, who studies at the school where K. is a janitor. Offers to help K. and K. uses him to attempt to find ways to get to the castle through his mother.
Herrenhof Landlord	Landlord of the Herrenhof Inn.
Herrenhof Landlady	Well dressed landlady at the Herrenhof Inn. Seems to be the matriarch of the Inn (as is Gardena at the Bridge Inn). Is distrustful of K.
Galater	He is the castle official that assigned the assistants to K. He was also "rescued" by Barnabas' father in a minor fire at the Herrenhof Inn.
Brügel (Bürgel in Harman edition)	A Secretary of a castle official, Friedrich. Friedrich is not mentioned again in the book, but in deleted text is referred to as an official who is falling out of favor. Brügel is a long-winded secretary who muses about Castle interrogations with K., when the latter errantly enters his room at the Herrenhof Inn. He indirectly offers to help K.; however K. is so tired that he does not accept the offer.
Sordini	An Italian castle secretary of formidable abilities, though he is kept in the lowest position of all, he exhaustively manages any transactions at the castle for his department and is suspicious of any potential error.
Sortini	Castle official associated with the village fire brigade who solicits Amalia with a sexually explicit and rude request to come to his room at the Herrenhof.
Teacher	A young, narrow-shouldered, domineering little man. When K. becomes the janitor at the school, the teacher becomes K.'s de facto superior. He does not approve of K. working at the school, but does not appear to have the authority to terminate K.'s appointment.
Miss Gisa (Fräulein Gisa), the school mistress	Tall, blond and beautiful if rather stiff assistant school teacher who is courted by Schwarzer and also dislikes K.
Schwarzer	An under-castellan's son who appears to have given up living in the castle to court Miss Gisa and become her student teacher; is prone to outbursts of official arrogance.
Pepi	Small, rosey and healthy; a chambermaid who is promoted to Frieda's barmaid position when the latter leaves her position at the Herrenhoff to live with K. She was a chambermaid with Emilie and Hennriette.
Lasemann, a tanner, father-in-law of Otto Brunswick (brother-in-law of Otto Brunswick in Harman edition)	Slow and dignified, the village tanner whose house K. rests in for a few hours during his first full day in the village.
Gerstacker, a coachman	Initially suspicious of K. but gives him a free sleigh ride back to the Bridge Inn after refusing to provide a ride to the castle. At the end of the book attempts to befriend K. since he believes K. has clout with Erlanger.
Seemann, the Fire Company chief	The fire chief who strips Barnabas' father of his fireman diploma after Barnabas' family falls into shame from Amalia's rude treatment of Sortini's Messenger.
Count Westwest	The local Graf and supposed owner of the castle. He is only mentioned and never appears.

== Major themes ==
=== Theology ===
It is well-documented that Brod's original construction was based on religious themes and this was furthered by the Muirs in their translations. But it has not ended with the Critical Editions. Numerous interpretations have been made with a variety of theological angles.

One interpretation of K.'s struggle to contact the castle is that it represents a man's search for salvation. According to Mark Harman, translator of a 1998 edition of The Castle, this was the interpretation favored by the original translators Willa Muir (helped by Edwin), who produced the first English volume in 1930. Harman feels he has removed the bias in the translations toward this view, but many still feel this is the point of the book.

Fueling the biblical interpretations of the novel are the various names and situations. For example, the official Galater (the German word for Galatians), one of the initial regions to develop a strong Christian following from the work of Apostle Paul and his assistant Barnabas. The name of the messenger, Barnabas, for the same reason. Even the Critical Editions naming of the beginning chapter, "Arrival", among other things liken K. to an Old Testament messiah.

=== Bureaucracy ===
The obvious thread throughout The Castle is bureaucracy. The extreme degree is nearly comical and the village residents' justifications of it are amazing. Hence it is no surprise that many feel that the work is a direct result of the political situation of the era in which it was written, which was shot through with anti-Semitism, remnants of the Habsburg monarchy, etc.

But even in these analyses, the veiled references to more sensitive issues are pointed out. For instance, the treatment of the Barnabas family, with their requirement to first prove guilt before they could request a pardon from it and the way their fellow villagers desert them have been pointed out as a direct reference to the anti-Semitic climate at the time.

In a review of the novel in The Guardian, William Burrows disputes the view that The Castle deals with bureaucracy, claiming that this view trivializes Kafka's literary and artistic vision, and is "reductive". He claims, instead, that the book is about solitude, pain, and the desire for companionship.

== Allusions to other works ==
Critics often talk of The Castle and The Trial in concert, highlighting the struggle of the protagonist against a bureaucratic system and standing before the law's door unable to enter as in the parable of the priest in The Trial.

In spite of motifs common with other works of Kafka, The Castle is quite different from The Trial. While K., the protagonist of The Castle, faces similar uncertainty and difficulty in grasping the reality that suddenly surrounds him, Josef K., the protagonist of The Trial, seems more experienced and emotionally stronger. But while Josef K.'s surroundings stay familiar even when strange events befall him, K. finds himself in a new world whose laws and rules are unfamiliar to him.

== Publication history ==
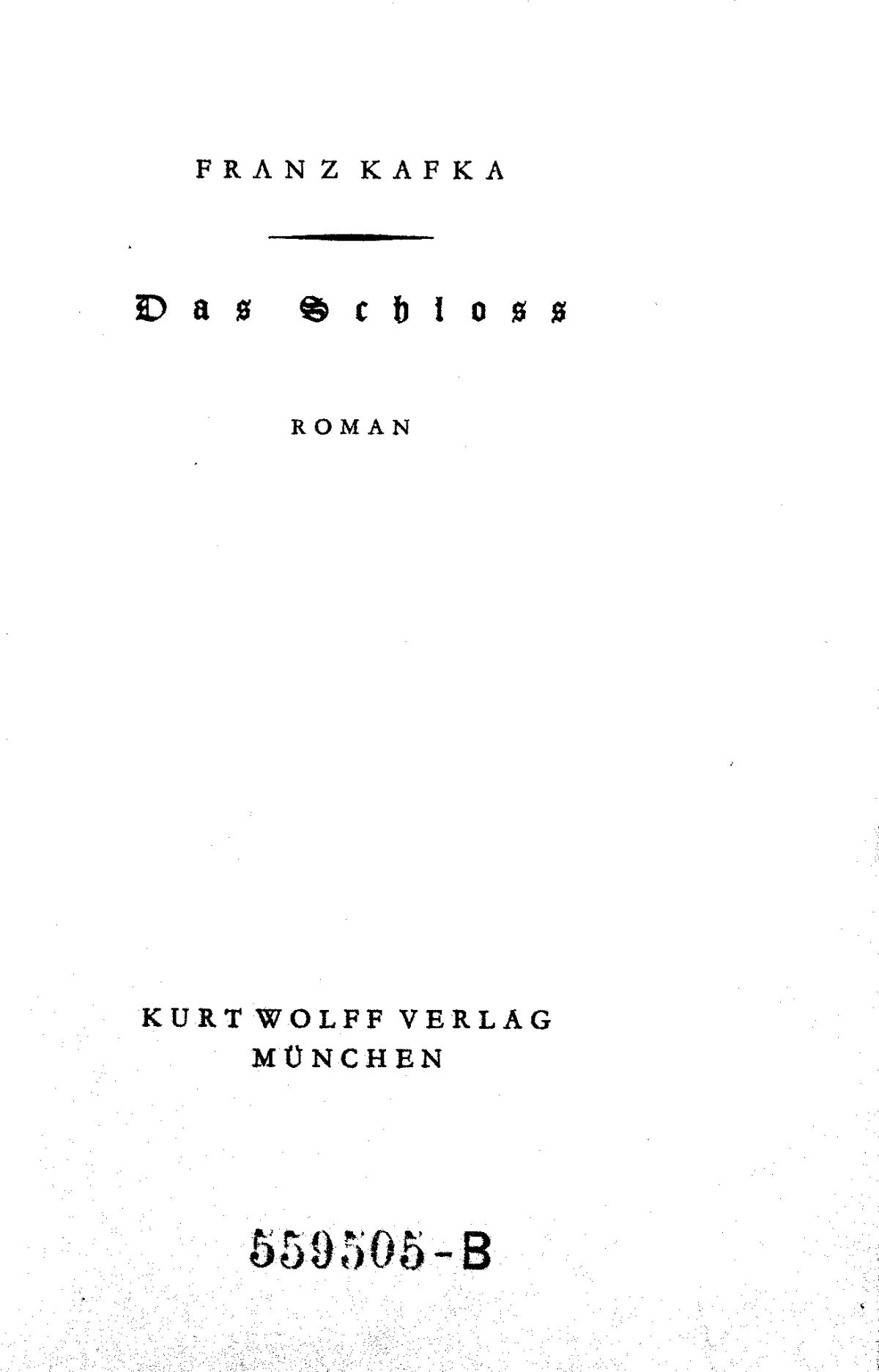
Title page of the first edition

In 1926 Brod persuaded Kurt Wolff to publish the first German edition of The Castle in his publishing house. Due to its unfinished nature and his desire to get Kafka's work published, Max Brod took some editorial freedom.

In 2022 the German text of The Castle entered the public domain in the US.

=== Muir translation ===
In 1930 Willa and Edwin Muir translated the first German edition of The Castle as it was compiled by Max Brod. It was published by Secker & Warburg in England and Alfred A. Knopf in the United States. The 1941 edition, with a homage by Thomas Mann, was the one that fed the post-war Kafka craze.

In 1954 the "definitive" edition was published and included additional sections Brod had added to the Schocken Definitive German edition. The new sections were translated by Eithne Wilkins and Ernst Kaiser. Some edits were made in the Muir text namely the changes were "Town Council" to "Village Council", "Superintendent" to "Mayor", "Clients" to "Applicants".

The 1992 edition of the Muirs' translation, in Alfred A. Knopf's Everyman's Library, contains a preface by Irving Howe.

The Muirs' translations use words that some consider "spiritual" in nature. For example, the Muirs translate the description of a church tower in K.'s homeland, which K. compares with the castle, as "soaring unfalteringly", where Harman, p. 8, uses "tapering decisively", Underwood, p. 9, writes, "tapering straight upward", and Bell, p. 11, writes "tapering into a spire". Furthermore, the Muirs use "illusory" from the opening paragraph forward. Some critics note this as further evidence of their bias toward a mystical interpretation.

=== Harman translation ===
In 1961 Malcolm Pasley was able to gain control of the manuscript, along with most of the other Kafka writings (save The Trial) and had it placed in the Oxford's Bodleian library. There, Pasley headed a team of scholars and recompiled Kafka's works into the Critical Edition. The Castle Critical Edition, in German, consists of two volumes—the novel in one volume and the fragments, deletions and editor's notes in a second volume. They were published by S. Fischer Verlag in 1982, hence occasionally referred to as the "Fischer Editions".

Mark Harman used the first volume of this set to create the 1998 edition of The Castle, often referred to as based on the "Restored Text" or the "English Critical Edition". Unlike the Muir translation, the fragments, deletions, and editor's notes are not included. According to the publisher's note:

We decided to omit the variants and passages deleted by Kafka that are included in Pasley's second volume, even though variants can indeed shed light on the genesis of literary texts. The chief objective of this new edition, which is intended for the general public, is to present the text in a form that is as close as possible to the state in which the author left the manuscript.

Eric Ormsby found Harman's translation generally more accurate than the Muirs' and that it gives "a sense of the harsh and jagged texture Kafka's prose on occasion displays". Yet, Ormsby added, "while Harman was usually right in his meanings, he was often wrong, and sometimes completely off, in his ability to catch the correct tone or register of a phrase or sentence".

Harman includes an eleven-page discussion on his philosophy behind the translation. This section provides significant information about the method he used and his thought process. There are numerous examples of passages from Pasley's, Muir's, and his translation to provide the reader with a better feel for the work. Some feel that his (and the publisher's) praise for his work and his "patronizing" of the Muirs goes a little too far. J. M. Coetzee writes that Harman says that his translation is "stranger and denser" than the Muirs'. But, Coetzee adds, "in its very striving toward strangeness and denseness [Harman's] own work—welcome though it is today—may, as history moves on and tastes change, be pointing toward obsolescence too".

== Adaptations ==
=== Film ===
The book was adapted to screen several times.

- The Castle (Das Schloß), a 1968 German film directed by Rudolf Noelte, starring Maximilian Schell as K.
- Linna, a 1986 Finnish adaptation directed by Jaakko Pakkasvirta. In this film, the main character's name was Josef K., who is the protagonist of Kafka's novel The Trial.
- The Castle (Замок), a 1994 Russian film directed by Aleksei Balabanov, starring Nikolay Stotsky as K.
- The Castle (Das Schloß), a 1997 Austrian film directed by Michael Haneke, starring Ulrich Mühe as K.

=== Radio ===
- The novel was adapted for radio in May 2015 in two parts by Ed Harris on BBC Radio 4. The cast included Dominic Rowan as "K.", Sammy T. Dobson as Frieda, Mark Benton as Jeremias, Daniel Weyman as Artur, Stephen Greif as Teacher, Rachel Bavidge as Gardena/Amalia, Victoria Elliott as Olga, Neil Grainger as Barnabas. Jonathan Cullen as Chief Superintendent and Dominic Deakin as Hans.

=== Other ===
- In 2012, American author (also of Introducing Kafka) David Zane Mairowitz released a graphic novel version of The Castle in conjunction with Czech artist and musician Jaromír 99 (Jaromír Švejdík). In 2013, versions were released in German ("Das Schloss") and Czech ("Zámek").
- An Off-Broadway stage version (starring Jim Parsons and William Atherton), written and produced by David Fishelson, achieved success in early 2002, receiving nominations for "Best Off-Broadway Play" by the Outer Critics Circle, as well as for "Best Play" by the Drama League (both New York theatre awards). The play was published by Dramatists Play Service in 2002.
- An opera in German Das Schloß was written in 1992 by Aribert Reimann, who based his own libretto on Kafka's novel and its dramatization by Max Brod. It premiered on 2 September 1992 at the Deutsche Oper Berlin, staged by Willy Decker and conducted by Michael Boder.

== See also ==
- Best German Novels of the Twentieth Century
