= City News (film) =

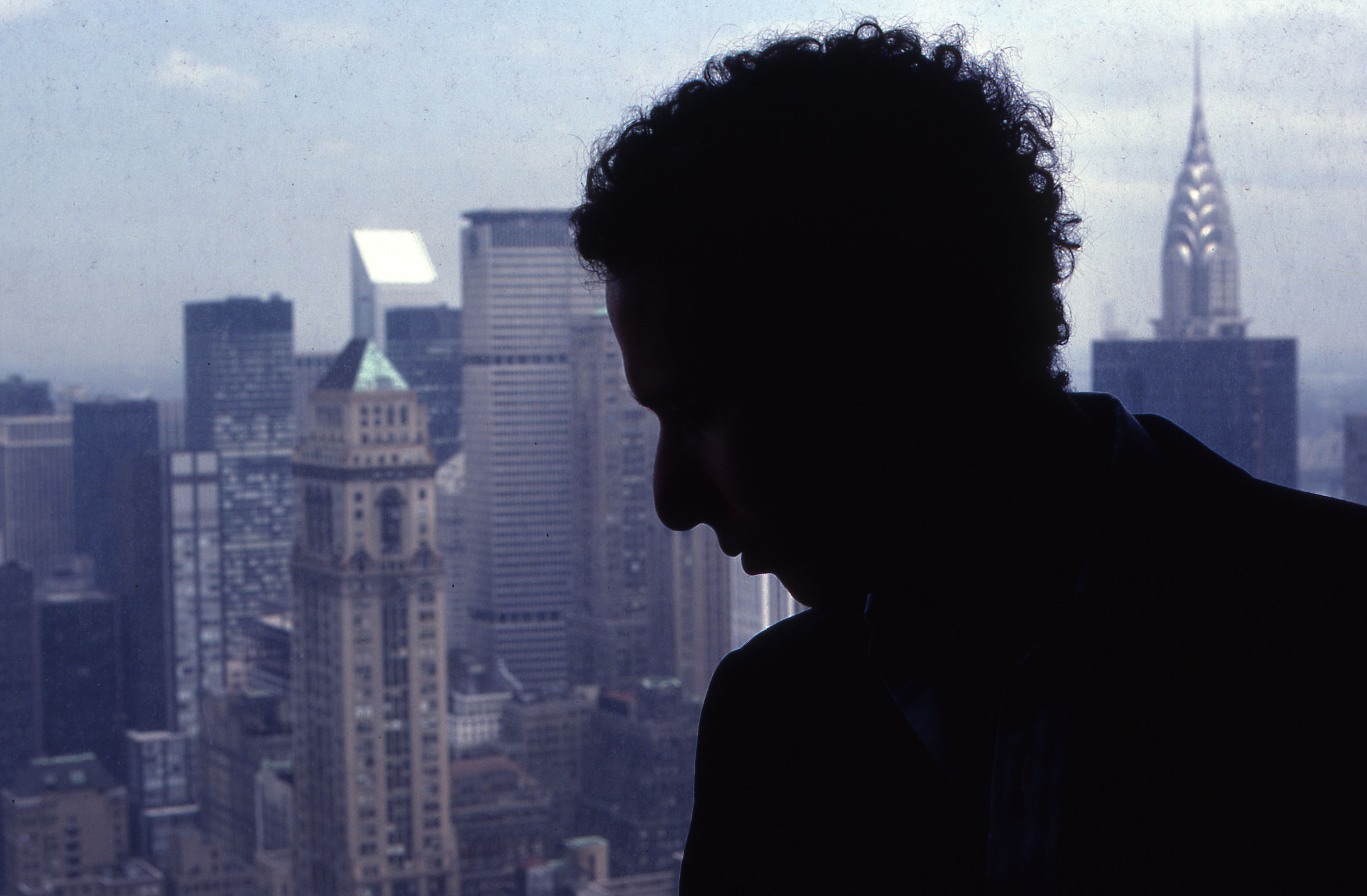
- Elliot Crown, publicity still from the film City News (1983)
- Written by: David Fishelson and Zoe Zinman
- Directed by: David Fishelson and Zoe Zinman
- Starring: Elliot Crown, Nancy Cohen, Thomas Trivier
- Music by: Saheb Sarbib, Jules Baptiste
- Country of origin: United States
- Original language: English

Production
- Producers: David Fishelson, Zoe Zinman, Richard Hoover
- Cinematography: Jonathan Sinaiko
- Editors: David Fishelson and Zoe Zinman
- Running time: 63 minutes

Original release
- Network: PBS
- Release: 1983

City News is an independent, American comedy film, written and directed by David Fishelson and Zoe Zinman in New York City in 1983, which was nationally broadcast on PBS in 1984, exhibited theatrically in the U.S. and Canada in 1983, and selected for 12 international film festivals (winning at 3) in 1983-4.

== Plot ==
The film is about "Tom Domino", a riffing, self-styled, noir-like protagonist who runs an East Village alternative newspaper by day, but who struggles by night when he gets home and tries to create a cartoon strip. A verbal sparring match with a sexy woman in a Manhattan bar one evening enables him to snap his cartoonist's writer's block, leading him to dash home after the encounter, and set down in cartoon form everything that just happened between him and the girl (whose name is "Daphne"). The cartoon strip (later named "City News") becomes a local hit, boosting his newspaper's sales. Now, with the newspaper finally a success, Domino finds himself in a conundrum: does he love Daphne genuinely for who she is, or only because she is the muse who has enabled him to become a success?

== Style ==
The style of City News owes a debt to various pop culture sources, including the cartooning of R. Crumb, Harvey Pekar, 1950s film noir narration, and the use of silhouettes to make the film's reality look more cartoon-like. Several sequences are modeled on early-1980s MTV music videos, including a seduction scene that unfolds during the playing of an arcade driving game, and an automobile wreck that intercuts live footage with comic strip imagery of the accident.

== Theatrical and festival release, critical reception ==
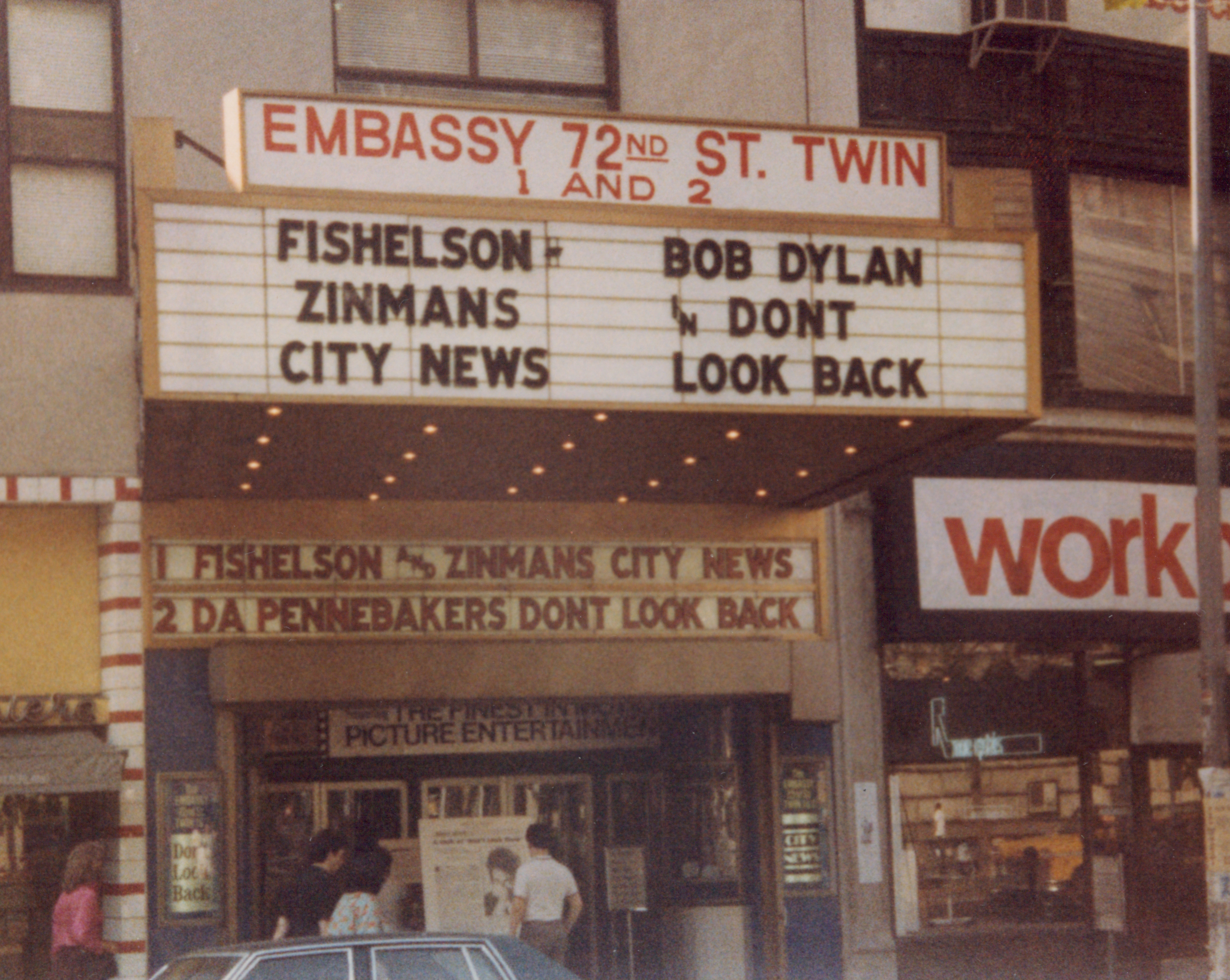
City News, theatrical opening, NYC, 1983

City News was first reviewed at a private screening in December, 1982, by Variety critic Lawrence Cohn. Soon after the review's publication, the film was selected for the 1983 Film Festivals of Atlanta, Edinburgh, Houston, Munich, Florence, Athens, Santa Fe, Seattle, Vancouver, Dallas, Göteborg and Antwerp — winning "Best Dramatic Film" at Atlanta, "Best Low-Budget Feature" at Houston, and "Best Feature (Narrative)" at Athens. City News was then acquired for theatrical exhibition by Cinecom Pictures (which distributed the film to movie theaters in the U.S. and Canada), where it received positive reviews from Judith Crist and USA Today, and a mixed review in The New York Times. By 1989, City News had been curated for the permanent collection of the Museum of Television & Radio, as well as listed in the American Film Institute's Catalog of Feature Films.

== PBS broadcast, TV critics' reception ==
City News was nationally broadcast on the third season of PBS' Peabody Award-winning television series American Playhouse in April, 1984. It received mostly favorable reviews (except from The New York Times, which was mixed) from newspaper critics around the U.S., including those of the Los Angeles Times, the New Orleans Times-Picayune, the Milwaukee Journal and the Cleveland Plain Dealer. While the film never enjoyed a transfer to commercial video following the PBS broadcast, it was eventually published to YouTube in 2013.
