= Raynor Scheine =

American actor

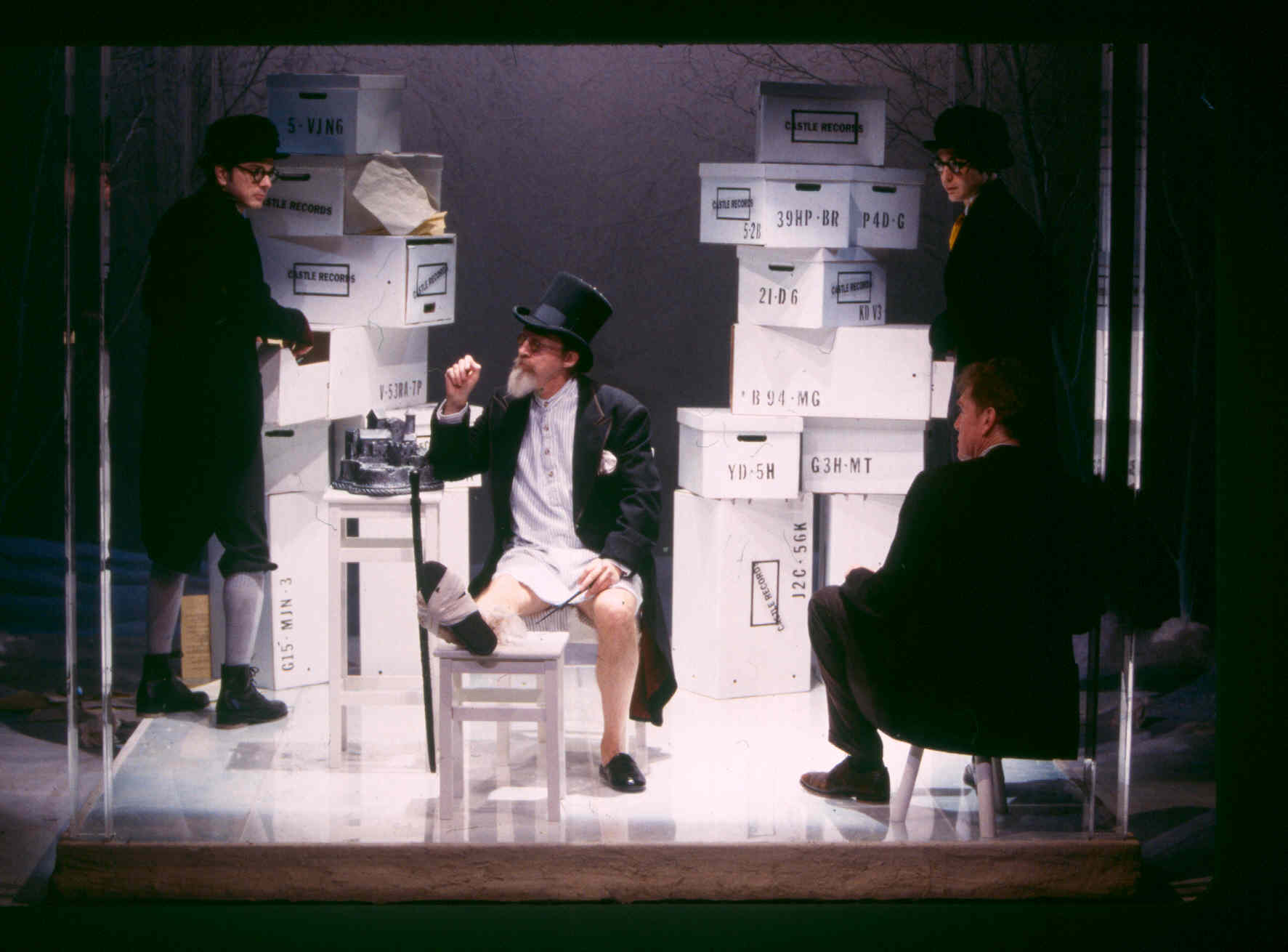
- Left to right: Grant Varjas, Raynor Scheine, Jim Parsons and William Atherton in David Fishelson's version of Franz Kafka's The Castle at Manhattan Ensemble Theatre in January 2002
- Born: Raynor Johnston; January 19, 1942 (age 84); Emporia, Virginia, U.S.
- Occupation: Actor
- Years active: 1971–present

Raynor Scheine (born Raynor Johnston; January 19, 1942) is an American actor who has appeared in films since 1979, including My Cousin Vinny and Fried Green Tomatoes. His name is a play on the phrase "rain or shine". Raised in Emporia, Virginia, he received a degree at Virginia Commonwealth University.

== Broadway performances ==
- Joe Turner's Come and Gone (Mar 27, 1988 – June 26, 1988) – Rutherford Selig
- Gem of the Ocean (December 6, 2004 – February 6, 2005) – Rutherford Selig
- Inherit the Wind (Present) – Elijah

== Filmography ==
=== Movie roles ===
- Something Short of Paradise (1979) .... Professor
- Bloodrage (1979) .... Fred
- A Stranger is Watching (1982) .... Derelict
- Lovesick (1983) .... Shelter
- Touched (1983) .... Mitchell
- Nothing Lasts Forever (1984) .... Hillbilly
- Insignificance (1985) .... Autograph Hunter
- 9½ Weeks (1986) .... Flower Delivery Guy
- No Mercy (1986) .... Curtis
- Stars and Bars (1988) .... Drunk
- Funny Farm (1988) .... Oates
- Lip Service (1988, TV Movie) .... Walter the 'Weather Moose'
- Johnny Handsome (1989) .... Gun dealer
- Ghost Dad (1990) .... Curtis Burch, the Cabbie
- The Naked Gun 2½: The Smell of Fear (1991) .... Explosion Thug #1
- Fried Green Tomatoes (1991) .... Sheriff Curtis Smoote
- My Cousin Vinny (1992) .... Ernie Crane
- The Real McCoy (1993) .... Baker
- Ace Ventura: Pet Detective (1994) .... Woodstock
- The War (1994) .... Mr. Lipnicki
- The Fence (1994) .... Jesse
- The Quick and the Dead (1995) .... Ratsy
- Killer: A Journal of Murder (1996) .... Trusty
- First Kid (1996) .... Maintenance Worker
- Last Man Standing (1996) .... Gas Station Attendant
- Extreme Measures (1996) .... Half-Mole
- Gone Fishin' (1997) .... Glenn
- Montana (1998) .... Fuller
- Joe the King (1999) .... Doctor
- Book of Shadows: Blair Witch 2 (2000) .... Rustin Parr
- Reveille (2001, Short) .... The Dude
- The Jimmy Show (2001) .... Pharmacist
- The Rookie (2002) .... Frank
- Season of the Hunted (2003) .... Roy
- Transamerica (2005) .... Bobby Jensen
- The New World (2005) .... Raynor
- The Sentinel (2006) .... Walter Xavier
- Man of the Year (2006) .... Mechanic
- Sugar Creek (2007) .... Frank Killings
- Magic (2010) .... Transient
- Zenith (2010) .... Dale
- Lincoln (2012) .... Josiah S. 'Beanpole' Burton
- Horizon: An American Saga – Chapter 1 (2024) .... Hermit

=== TV roles ===
- The Cosby Show – "Denise Kendall: Babysitter" (1989) .... Bob
- L.A. Law – "Love in Bloom" (1992) .... Lenny Varnes
- The West Wing – "In Excelsis Deo" (1999) .... Homeless Man
- Sliders – "Slidecage", "Way Out West" (1999) .... Koitar
- Third Watch – "Spring Forward, Fall Back" (2000) .... Fitz
- The Jimmy Show (2001) .... Pharmacist
- ER – "Freefall" (2003) .... Mr. Garland
- The District – "A House Divided" (2003) .... William 'Boots' Burke
- Deadwood – "Deadwood" (2004)
- Law & Order: Criminal Intent – "Silencer" (2007) .... Antonio
- A Stranger's Heart (2007) .... Frank

=== Video game roles ===
- Dark Reign: The Future of War (1997) (VG) (voice)
- Medal of Honor: Frontline (2002) (VG) (voice) .... Additional Voices
- Grand Theft Auto: San Andreas (2004) (VG) (voice) .... Pedestrian
- Red Dead Revolver (2004) (VG) (voice) .... Blind Willie Wilson / Cowboys #10
- BioShock (2007) (VG) (voice)
