= List of tributes to Hank Williams =

== Albums ==
Tribute albums to Hank Williams include the following:

- A Tribute To Hank Williams (1959) by Johnny Williams & The Singing Cowboys
- George Jones Salutes Hank Williams (1960) by George Jones
- Sings the Songs of Hank Williams (1961) by Ronnie Hawkins
- My Favorites of Hank Williams (1962) by George Jones
- Hank Locklin Sings Hank Williams (1964) by Hank Locklin
- Hank Williams the Roy Orbison Way (1970) by Roy Orbison
- Johnny Cash and Jerry Lee Lewis Sing Hank Williams (1971), by Johnny Cash and Jerry Lee Lewis
- There's a Little Bit of Hank in Me (1980) by Charley Pride
- Stars & Hank Forever: The American Composers Series (1986) by The Residents (one side contains Hank Williams songs, the other contains versions of marches by John Philip Sousa)
- Hanky Panky (1994), by The The
- Hillbilly Shakespeare (1999) by Bap Kennedy. Kennedy's follow-up album Lonely Street, released in 2000, contains numerous references to Hank Williams, and on the sleeve notes, Kennedy acknowledges that the songs were inspired by both Williams and Elvis Presley.
- Timeless (2001), by artists including Bob Dylan, Johnny Cash, Keith Richards, Tom Petty and Hank Williams III. Timeless was awarded the Grammy Award for Best Country Album, and Cash's version of "I Dreamed About Mama Last Night", which appears on the album, was nominated for the Grammy Award for Best Male Country Vocal Performance.

Other artists who have released Hank Williams tribute albums include Ray Price, Connie Stevens, George Hamilton IV, Floyd Cramer, Glen Campbell, Moe Bandy, Charlie Rich, Del Shannon, Sammy Kershaw, Trio Los Panchos, Jack Scott and Girls Guns and Glory.

Doo-wop singer Dion DiMucci credited Hank Williams as his #1 musical influence, and covered "Honky Tonk Blues" on his Grammy-nominated album Bronx in Blue in 2007.

== Songs ==
In 1981 Drifting Cowboys steel guitarist Don Helms teamed up with Hank Williams, Jr. to record "The Ballad of Hank Williams". The track is a spoof or novelty song about Hank Sr.'s early years in the music business and his spending excesses. It was sung to the tune of "The Battle of New Orleans," popularized by Johnny Horton. Hank Jr. begins by saying, "Don, tell us how it really was when you was working with Daddy." Helms then goes into a combination of spoken word and song with Williams to describe how Hank, Sr. would "spend a thousand dollars on a hundred dollar show," among other humorous peculiarities. The chorus line "So he fired my ass and he fired Jerry Rivers and he fired everybody just as hard as he could go. He fired Old Cedric and he fired Sammy Pruett. And he fired some people that he didn't even know" is a comical reference to Hank Williams's overreaction to given circumstances. In 1991 country artist Alan Jackson released "Midnight in Montgomery", a song whose lyrics portray meeting Hank Williams's spirit at Williams's gravesite while on his way to a New Year's Eve show. Country artist Marty Stuart also paid homage to Williams with a tribute track entitled "Me and Hank and Jumping Jack Flash". The lyrics tell a story similar to the "Midnight in Montgomery" theme but about an up-and-coming country music singer getting advice from Williams's spirit. In 1983 country music artist David Allan Coe released "The Ride," a song that told a story of a young man with his guitar hitchhiking through Montgomery and being picked up by the ghost of Hank Williams in his Cadillac and driven to the edge of Nashville: "... You don't have to call me mister, mister, the whole world called me Hank."

Songs that pay tribute to Williams include:

- "Alcohol and Pills" by Fred Eaglesmith and covered by Todd Snider
- "Are You Sure Hank Done It This Way", "If Old Hank Could Only See Us Now", and "Hank Williams Syndrome", all by Waylon Jennings
- "The Car Hank Died In" by the Austin Lounge Lizards
- "Classic Cars" by Bright Eyes
- "The Conversation" by Waylon Jennings and Hank Williams Jr., with the opening lyric sung by Jennings, "Hank, let's talk about your daddy"
- "Crank the Hank" by Dallas Wayne
- "Crazy Town" by Jason Aldean
- "Curse of Hank" by Tim Hus
- "The Death of Hank Williams" and "Hank Williams Sings the Blues No More", both by Jimmie Logsdon
- "Don't Look Down" by Grant Lee Phillips contains the line "Luke the Drifter and me thumbed us a ride down the highway of dreams."
- "Family Tradition" by Hank Williams Jr.
- "Ghost of Hank Williams" by David Allan Coe
- "The Ghost of Hank Williams" by the Kentucky Headhunters
- "The Grand Ole Opry (Ain't So Grand Anymore)" by Hank Williams III includes the lyrics, "The Grand Ole Opry ain't so grand anymore/Did you know Hank Williams is not a member, but they keep him outside their door."
- "The Great Hank" by Robert Earl Keen, detailing a dream in which Hank Williams is singing in drag in a bar
- "Hank" by Her Make Believe Band
- "Hank" by Jason Boland & the Stragglers
- "Hank and Fred" by Loudon Wainwright III
- "Hank and Me" by Loved Up Les Glover
- "Hank it" by Justin Moore
- "Hank, Karen and Elvis" by The Young Fresh Fellows
- "Hank Williams" by Los Langeros
- "Hank Williams" by Ry Cooder
- "Hank Williams' Cadillac" and "I Feel Like Hank Williams Tonight" by Chris Wall
- "Hank Williams' Ghost" by Darrell Scott
- "Hank Williams' Guitar" by Freddie Hart
- "Hank Williams Said It Best" by Guy Clark and also covered recently by Mick Harvey
- "Hank Williams, You Wrote My Life" by Moe Bandy (written by Paul Craft)
- "Hank's Cadillac" by Ashley Monroe
- "Hank's Cadillac" by the group of the same name
- "Has Anybody Here Seen Hank?" by The Waterboys
- "Hats Off to Hank" by Buzz Cason
- "Heart's Hall of Fame" by the Bailey Brothers
- "Here's to Hank" by Stonewall Jackson
- "I Couldn't Sleep for Thinkin' of Hank Williams" by Henry McCullough
- "I Feel Like Hank Williams Tonight" by Jerry Jeff Walker
- "I Saw the Light" by David Crowder Band
- "If He Came Back Again" by The Highwaymen
- "If Heaven Wasn't So Far Away" by Justin Moore
- "If You Don't Like Hank Williams" by Kris Kristofferson
- "A Legend Froze In Time" by David Church, including Don Helms on steel guitar
- "The Life of Hank Williams" by Hawkshaw Hawkins
- "Long White Cadillac", originally recorded by The Blasters. The song was written and later performed by guitarist Dave Alvin after he left the group. It was also covered by Dwight Yoakam.
- "Lotta Boot Left To Fill" by Eric Church: "I don't think Waylon done it that way. And if he was here he'd say Hoss, neither did Hank."
- "Midnight in Montgomery" by Alan Jackson
- "Mission from Hank" by Aaron Tippin. Tippin also references Williams in "Ready to Rock (in a Country Kind of Way)".
- "Montgomery in the Rain" by Steve Young, also covered by Hank Williams, Jr.
- "My Kinda Party", originally sung by Brantley Gilbert and covered by Jason Aldean: "You can find me, in the back of a jacked up tailgate, chillin' with some Skynyrd and some old Hank"
- "The Night Hank Williams Came to Town" by Johnny Cash and Waylon Jennings
- "Nosferatu Man" by Slint contains the lyrics, "If I could settle down, I'd be doing just fine/Until I hear that old train, coming down the line" from Williams's song "Ramblin'Man".
- "Ole Hank Williams" by Jim Tragas
- "Over Hank It" by Bryan Martin
- "Rebel Meets Rebel" by Rebel Meets Rebel includes the chorus, "Rebel meets rebel, we've got our pride, like old Hank said, it's been a long, hard ride".
- "The Ride" by David Allan Coe tells the story of a drifting singer's encounter with the ghost of Hank Williams on a journey from Alabama to Nashville, Tennessee.
- "Roberta" by Rev. Billy C. Wirtz (underneath the black velvet painting of Elvis, Jesus and John Wayne walking together through eternity, watched over by Hank Sr.)
- "Rollin' and Ramblin' (The Death of Hank Williams)" by R. & L. Williams and J. Clark, covered by Emmylou Harris on her 1990 album Brand New Dance.
- "Talkin to Hank" by Mark Chesnutt
- "Things Change" by Tim McGraw and "I Need You" by McGraw and wife Faith Hill
- "This Ain't Montgomery" by Joey Allcorn & Hank Williams III
- "This Old Guitar" by Neil Young refers to Williams's original D-28 Martin guitar, which Young has toured with for over 30 years.
- "Time Marches On" by Tracy Lawrence
- "Time to Change my Name to Hank" written by Jim Flynn
- "Tower of Song" by Leonard Cohen
- "Tramp on Your Street" by Billy Joe Shaver
- "A Tribute to Hank Williams, My Buddy" by Luke McDaniel
- "Tribute to Hank Williams" by Tim Hardin
- "Waitin' on Hank" by Canadian country rock band Dry County
- "When You Died at Twenty-Nine" by Slaid Cleaves
- "Who's Gonna Fill Their Shoes" by George Jones refers to Williams in the lines, "You know the heart of country music still beats in Luke the Drifter, you can tell it when he sang 'I Saw the Light'."
- "Winkin' Blinkin' Country Music Star" by Tex Garrison contains the lyrics "A storybook of love gone wrong by Luke the Driftin' Vagabond"
- Jesus & Bocepus By Kid Rock
- Hank and Jesus by The Cadillac Three
- Drank like Hank by Josh Thompson
- "Play Me A Hank Song" by Tyler Childers
- "The Yellow Circle Of Light by Jason Cole

Other songs include "Hank, It Will Never Be the Same Without You", "Hank Williams Meets Jimmie Rodgers", "Tribute to Hank Williams", "Hank and Lefty Raised My Country Soul", "Hank Williams Will Live Forever", "The Ghost of Hank Williams," "In Memory of Hank Williams", "Thanks Hank", "Hank's Home Town", "Good Old Boys Like Me" (Hank Williams and Tennessee Williams), "Why Ain't I Half as Good as Old Hank (Since I'm Feeling All Dead Anyway)?" and "The Last Letter" (Mississippi disc jockey Jimmy Swan's reading of a letter to Williams by M-G-M boss Frank Walker).

"I've Done Everything Hank Did But Die" was written and performed by Keith Whitley. Never officially released, it was presumably recorded sometime after Whitley had surpassed the age of 29, Hank's age when he died. Whitley, who like his idol battled alcoholism, died of acute alcohol poisoning at the age of 33.

On the album Show Me Your Tears, Frank Black's song "Everything Is New" recounts the tragedy of both Williams' and Johnny Horton's deaths. The relevant lyrics are "Hiram said to John have you met my wife? Someday she'll be yours when I lose my life. He lost it after playing the old Skyline. Seven years later, after that same gig, John took the wheel, but when he got to the bridge Billy Jean was alone for the second time." Billy Jean of course refers to Billie Jean Jones (Jones being her maiden name) who married both Hiram "Hank" Williams and, later, John "Johnny" Horton. Both men died in vehicles, and both played their last (separate) concerts at Austin, Texas's "the old Skyline" Club (as the song mentions).

== Films ==
Films that depict Hank Williams include:

- Your Cheatin' Heart (1964), directed by Gene Nelson, starring George Hamilton as Williams and Susan Oliver as Audrey Williams
- Hank Williams: The Show He Never Gave (1980), directed by David Acomba and starring Sneezy Waters
- The Last Ride (2011), which depicts the last four days of Williams' life, directed by Harry Thomason and starring Henry Thomas as Williams and Jesse James as Silas the young driver
- I Saw the Light (2015), directed by Marc Abraham and starring Tom Hiddleston. Williams' grandson, singer Hank Williams III, publicly expressed his displeasure with the film, calling it "deeply flawed."

The 2004 Canadian film Hank Williams First Nation, directed by Aaron James Sorensen, is about a Cree tribesman who suspects that Williams faked his death and travels to Nashville, Tennessee to see if he is still alive.

Filmmaker Paul Schrader wrote an unproduced script entitled Eight Scenes From the Life of Hank Williams.

== Other tributes ==
The Off-Broadway musical Hank Williams: Lost Highway, co- authored by Randal Myler and Mark Harelik, earned an Obie award for star Jason Petty and numerous other New York City theatre award nominations for producer David Fishelson and director Randal Myler in 2003, including "Best Musical" and "Best Off-Broadway Musical" from the Lortel and Outer Critics Circle organizations. In addition, the show earned positive reviews from the national press: Rolling Stone critic and editor Anthony DeCurtis wrote, “I was genuinely surprised, even stunned by [Fishelson's version of] Hank Williams: Lost Highway.... a rare achievement in any musical theater that I've ever seen;” and Jeremy McCarter of New York magazine called the production "electrifying", "the most successful jukebox musical I've seen," and "New York's most exciting new musical since Urinetown." The original cast recording of the show was released in 2003.

The play Hank Williams: The Show He Never Gave is a fictional account of the concert he was traveling to when he died. Written by Maynard Collins, the play toured across Canada from 1977–1990, and starred Sneezy Waters. A film, made for Canadian TV, first aired on December 31, 1980.

The band Hillbilly Shakespeare from The Netherlands, brings live tribute to Hank Williams, to festivals, clubs and theaters in Europa, since 2023.

On Dolly Parton's 2008 album, Backwoods Barbie, the song "The Lonesomes" mentions Hank Williams: "Just like that old song by Hank Williams, I am so lonesome I could cry." On her 2014 album Blue Smoke, the song "Home" mentions Williams when saying "I'm so lonesome I could cry just like old Hank."

The chorus of Waylon Jennings' hit "Luckenbach, Texas (Back to the Basics of Love)" refers to "...Hank Williams pain songs and Newbury's train songs, and blue eyes cryin' in the rain."

== Music videos ==
Year	Video	Director
1989	"There's a Tear in My Beer" (with Hank Williams, Jr.)	Ethan Russell
	"Honky Tonk Blues"	
1996	"Cold, Cold Heart	Buddy Jackson
