= The Golem (Leivick) =

Play written by H. Leivick

דער גולם
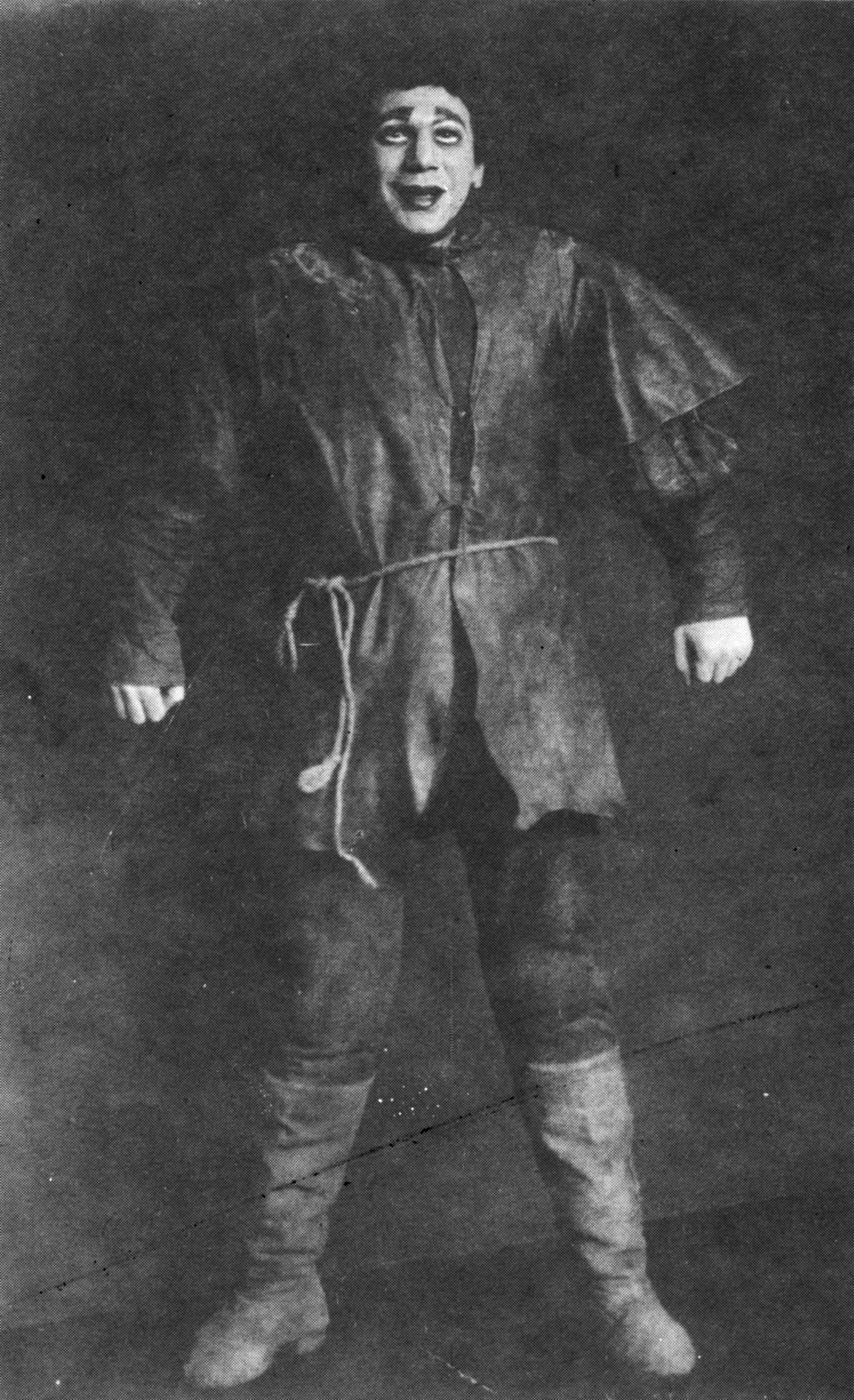
- Aharon Meskin as the Golem, Habima Theatre (1927)
- Original language: Yiddish
- Written by: H. Leivick
- Genre: Dramatic poem

The Golem (original Yiddish title דער גולם, Der Goylem) is a 1921 "dramatic poem in eight scenes" by H. Leivick. The story is a reworking of a legend of Judah Loew ben Bezalel, known as the Maharal, a great rabbi of Prague. In the legend, he animates a golem, a being crafted from inanimate material. The story is strongly focused on the plight of the golem, animated against his will and wrestling with his particular form of the human condition, and, secondarily, of the rabbi, a "creator whose creation does not respond in accordance with his plan."

Leivick referred to this work as a "dramatic poem" rather than a "play." As originally written, it was unstageable, requiring, for example, that flames flicker out of their own accord and that actors be visibly knocked about (and even bloodied) by invisible forces; furthermore, the full piece would probably take at least four hours to stage, perhaps longer. However, stageable versions were soon developed, and the play became a standard of Yiddish theater. The Golem is written in blank verse.

As in Gustav Meyrink's 1915 novel of the same name, there is an admixture of material of Christian origin and probably influence from Mary Shelley's Frankenstein. Leivick's version includes several messiah figures, including a young beggar (representative of the Jewish messiah to come), "The Man With the Cross," and the golem himself.

== Plot ==
The action is set in Prague in the seventeenth century.

Rabbi Leyb (as Loew is known in Yiddish) creates a golem out of clay—despite pleas from the spirit of the future golem not to create him. The rabbi gives the golem the name of Yosl and tells other people that he is a stranger from out of town, who will chop wood and carry water for the synagogue. Nonetheless, the people of the Jewish community of Prague are scared and somewhat disturbed by the golem.

The rabbi sends the golem to sleep in the Fifth Tower, a ruin where the local beggars live. An old beggar and a young beggar from out of town join them. The Christian priest Tadeush arrives in the tower and forces the beggars out, speaking ominously about blood libel, but the golem remains hidden in the tower. The rabbi joins him and instructs him to go into a cave underneath the tower, where the rabbi cannot follow, and retrieve bottles of blood that Tadeush has planted in an attempt to frame the Jewish community for blood libel. He does so, but is trapped and overwhelmed by spirits and forces which haunt the cave. He is joined by the young beggar from earlier, whom the rabbi had chased out of the city, and a man carrying a cross: three messianic figures. The spirits terrify the golem and convince him to stay in the cave forever, but the rabbi finds him alone and takes him away.

A few weeks later, the golem lies listless outside of the synagogue, calling for the rabbi to come to him. The rabbi finally comes, and insists that the golem is on his own now. The golem rampages around Prague, destroying buildings and killing a few members of the Jewish community, and he promises to stop only if the rabbi stays with him, forever. The rabbi agrees, castigating himself for his choices, and removes the life from the golem.

== Reception ==
The Museum of the Yiddish Theatre writes that The Golem was "an overwhelming success everywhere."

According to the 1963 Lexicon of Yiddish Literature, "People read and re-read [The Golem], debated and wrote about the problems of the book: World liberation and Jewish redemption, the role of matter and the role of the spirit in the process of redemption, the Jewish Messiah and the Christian Savior, Maharal and the Golem of Prague, the masses and the individual, creator and creation, realism and symbolism — all this was stirred up in the 1920s by Leyvik’s Golem."

Scholar Simchi Cohen writes that Leivick's text is "perhaps the golem’s most famous literary treatment."

== Stagings ==
Though The Golem was published in Yiddish, its first staged production occurred in Hebrew translation in 1923, when it was put on by the Habima Theatre in Moscow. It continued to be performed there for several years. The music for this production was composed by Moses Milner. The play was also put on by the Goodman Theatre in Chicago in 1928.

It was first produced in Yiddish in New York in 1931 by the Yiddish Ensemble Art Theatre. It was directed by Egon Bleicher, with music by Joseph Achron, and starred Alexander Granach as the golem and Lazar Freed as Rabbi Leyb. Leivick helped to prepare this stage version. Some of a reworked version of the musical score can be heard here. Another setting by Vladimir Heifetz was performed at Carnegie Hall by the Jewish Culture Society Chorus.

An Off-Broadway stage version (starring Robert Prosky and Joseph McKenna), produced and adapted from Leivick by David Fishelson, achieved success in early 2002, receiving a "Best Supporting Actor" nomination for McKenna by the Outer Critics Circle, as well as a Sunday Arts feature article in The New York Times. The play was published by Dramatists Play Service in 2003.

A stage version of The Golem based on Leivick's poem has recently been published by the American playwright Howard Rubenstein and premiered at the Penn Theatre, San Diego.
