= Touring Broadway Awards =

The Touring Broadway Awards (TBAs) recognized outstanding achievement in Broadway plays and musicals that tour North America. Founded in 2001 by The Broadway League, the TBAs celebrated excellence in touring Broadway by honoring artists and productions. Until 2004, they were known as the National Broadway Theatre Awards and were held until 2009. The TBAs were bestowed at a ceremony held in New York each spring. They were the 1st national awards that honored first class touring Broadway shows.

Logo for the Touring Broadway Awards.

== Award categories ==
The award categories included:

- Best New Musical
- Best Play
- Best Long-Running Musical (3 years or more)
- Best Musical Score
- Best Song in a Musical
- Best Direction
- Best Choreography
- Best Production Design
- Best Visual Presentation
- Best Costumes
- Best Actor in a Play
- Best Actor in a Musical
- Best Actress in a Play
- Best Actress in a Musical
- Touring Broadway Achievement Award
- Broadway Fan Club People's Choice Award

== Winners ==
=== 2001 ===
Best New Musical: Ragtime

Best Play: Dame Edna: The Royal Tour
Author: Barry Humphries

Best Visual Presentation: Beauty and the Beast

Best Musical Score: Les Misérables
Music by Claude-Michel Schönberg
Lyrics by Herbert Kretzmer

Best Song in a Musical: “'Til We Reach That Day” (1st Act Finale) from Ragtime

Best Direction: Sam Mendes & Rob Marshall for Cabaret

Best Costumes: Ann Hould-Ward for Beauty and the Beast

Best Choreography: Bob Fosse for Fosse

Best Actor in a Play: Barry Humphries in Dame Edna: The Royal Tour

Best Actor in a Musical: David Pittu in Parade

Best Actress in a Play: Sherri Parker Lee in The Vagina Monologues

Best Actress in a Musical: Louise Pitre in Mamma Mia!

=== 2002 ===
Best New Musical: Aida

Best Play: Copenhagen
Author: Michael Frayn

Best Visual Presentation: Aida

Best Musical Score: Les Misérables
Music by Claude-Michel Schönberg
Lyrics by Herbert Kretzmer

Best Song in a Musical: “Bring Him Home” from Les Misérables

Best Direction: Robert Falls for Aida

Best Costumes: Ann Hould-Ward for Beauty and the Beast

Best Actor in a Play: Len Cariou in Copenhagen

Best Actor in a Musical: Patrick Cassidy in Aida

Best Actress in a Play: Mariette Hartley in Copenhagen

Best Actress in a Musical: Simone in Aida

=== 2003 ===
Best New Musical: The Producers

Best Play: The Tale of the Allergist's Wife
Author: Charles Busch

Best Production Design: Aida
Scenic and Costume Design: Bob Crowley
Lighting Design: Natasha Katz

Best Musical Score: Mamma Mia!
Music and Lyrics: Benny Andersson and Björn Ulvaeus

Best Direction: Julie Taymor for The Lion King

Best Choreography: Susan Stroman for Contact

Best Long-Running Musical: Les Misérables

Touring Broadway Career Achievement Award: Daryl T. Dodson

=== 2004 ===
Best New Musical: Urinetown

Best Play: Say Goodnight Gracie
Author: Rupert Holmes

Best Production Design: Thoroughly Modern Millie
Scenic Design: David Gallo
Costume Design: Martin Pakledinaz
Lighting Design: Donald Holder

Best Musical Score: Urinetown
Music: Mark Hollmann
Lyrics: Mark Hollmann and Greg Kotis

Best Direction: Susan Stroman for The Producers

Best Choreography: Rob Ashford for Thoroughly Modern Millie

Best Long-Running Musical: Les Misérables

Touring Broadway Career Achievement Award: Gary McAvay

=== 2005 ===
Best New Musical: Movin' Out

Best Play: The Graduate
Author: Terry Johnson

Best Production Design: Little Shop of Horrors
Scenic Design: Scott Pask
Costume Design: William Ivey Long
Lighting Design: Donald Holder

Best Musical Score: Chicago
Music: John Kander
Lyrics: Fred Ebb

Best Direction: Susan Stroman for The Producers

Best Choreography: Twyla Tharp for Movin' Out

Best Long-Running Musical: Mamma Mia!

Touring Broadway Career Achievement Award: Alan Ross Kosher
Company manager of The Lion King

=== 2006 ===
Best New Musical: Wicked

Best Play: Golda's Balcony
Author: William Gibson

Best Production Design: Wicked
Scenic Design: Eugene Lee
Costume Design: Susan Hilferty
Lighting Design: Kenneth Posner

Best Musical Score: Wicked
Music and Lyrics: Stephen Schwartz

Best Direction: Jack O'Brien for Hairspray

Best Choreography: Ann Reinking for Chicago

Best Long-Running Musical: Les Misérables

=== 2007 ===
Best New Musical: Monty Python's Spamalot

Best Play: Doubt
Author: John Patrick Shanley

Best Production Design: Monty Python's Spamalot
Scenic and Costume Design: Tim Hatley
Lighting Design: Hugh Vanstone

Best Musical Score: The Light in the Piazza
Music and Lyrics: Adam Guettel

Best Direction: Mike Nichols for Monty Python's Spamalot

Best Choreography: Twyla Tharp for Movin' Out

Best Long-Running Musical: Chicago

Touring Broadway Achievement Award: Tom Hewitt
Played Lawrence Jameson in the national tour of Dirty Rotten Scoundrels

Broadway Fan Club People's Choice Award: Wicked

=== 2008 ===
Best New Musical: Monty Python’s Spamalot

Best Play: Twelve Angry Men
Author: Reginald Rose

Best Production Design: My Fair Lady
Scenic and Costume Design: Anthony Ward
Lighting Design: David Hersey

Best Musical Score: Wicked
Music and Lyrics: Stephen Schwartz

Best Direction: Joe Mantello for Wicked

Best Choreography: Casey Nicholaw for The Drowsy Chaperone

Best Long-Running Musical: The Lion King

Touring Broadway Achievement Award: Brad Little

Broadway Fan Club People's Choice Award: Wicked

=== 2009 ===
Best New Musical: Legally Blonde the Musical

Best Play: Frost/Nixon
Author: Peter Morgan

Best Production Design: Legally Blonde the Musical
Scenic Design: David Rockwell
Costume Design: Gregg Barnes
Lighting Design: Kenneth Posner

Best Musical Score: Spring Awakening
Music: Duncan Sheik
Lyrics: Steven Sater

Best Direction: Michael Mayer for Spring Awakening

Best Choreography: Jerry Mitchell for Legally Blonde the Musical

Best Long-Running Musical: Wicked

Touring Broadway Achievement Award: Bill Miller

Broadway Fan Club People's Choice Award: Wicked
