= Opera in Canada =

As an old form of art in a new country, opera came to Canada relatively late. Although the first composition can be traced back to the seventeenth century it was not until 150 years later that Canadian opera caught up. Canadian opera became especially fashionable on Canada's 1967 centennial year. These celebrations set off an interest in operas among Canadian composers that was never seen before. This interest in opera, among composers and audience alike, is noticeable until today. However, most Canadian operatic works are not known internationally since many of them specifically concern Canadian themes and are small in scale.

Canadian operas are typically influenced by the history of the country. Many deal with First Nations and immigration themes or concern specific historical events and figures. Canada's diversity is thus very much reflected by the operatic works of its composers.

== Early Canadian opera ==
The first opera written on Canadian soil was Joseph Quesnel's Colas et Colinette. Written in 1788 and first performed in 1790 in Montreal, it was again produced in Quebec in 1805. The comedic opera in three acts is written in a manner that clearly shows the composer's French heritage. The characters are “stock characters” that were often found in French comedies such as Molière's and Jean-Jacques Rousseau's. The similarities between the characters but also the plots may be due to the fact, that the plays as well as operas show the morals of French society at the time. From the musical part of Colas et Colinette, only the vocal and second-violin parts are preserved. It contains many arias and duets that differ and vary to show the contrasting characters. The opera ends with a vaudeville finale before the closing chorus – a common practice at the time.

In 1963, Godfrey Ridout reconstructed the musical parts of Colas et Colinette. He also composed an overture for the work that he based on the themes of the opera. Since the piece was first composed as an afterpiece, there was no overture included. The reconstructed version was first staged in 1963 at the Ten Centuries Concerts in Toronto and broadcast on television by the Canadian Broadcasting Corporation (CBC) in 1968. Even though it is regarded the first Canadian opera, Colas et Colinette is in its tradition still closer to France than to Canada.

Joseph Quesnel also wrote a second opera, Lucas et Cécile. A notice on its production can be found in 1808 while an actual performance of it is not certain. Of this work, only the vocal parts were preserved. Five singers are employed in the twelve solo numbers, two duets, two trios and one finale. The opera was reconstructed by John Beckwith in 1989 and staged by Tafelmusik in Toronto in 1994 and later in Montreal.

== Nineteenth century ==
After Quesnel's compositions, the next occurrence of Canadian opera is not found until the 1860s. Major European operas were now regularly staged in Canada, and so Canadian composers became motivated to contribute similar works themselves. Canadian opera at this point starts to deal with Canadian themes such as politics and First Nations issues.

Calixa Lavallée – today mostly known for composing the national anthem of Canada – wrote three comedic operas from 1865/66 until 1880. TIQ – The Indian Question Settled at Last (1865/66) deals with First Nations issues of the time. The composer also tried to include aspects of the music from the native Sioux people. Of his other operas, The Widow (1880) has been preserved. However, his second opera Lou-Lou from 1872 is lost today.

In the 1880s, comical operas as well as parodies of other operatic works became popular. One of these is Leo, the Royal Cadet (1889), by the German-born composer Oscar Ferdinand Telgmann (1855–1946). It deals with the career of the protagonist, Leo, and features caricatures of the Royal Military College of Canada's professors, from which many situations and characters were drawn. The opera was first staged at Martin's Opera House in Kingston during July 1889 and went on tour with several groups afterwards. By 1925 it had been performed around 150 times, making it a record among Canadian operas.

Among the works that parodied other operas was George Broughall's The Tearful and Tragical Tale of the Tricky Troubadour; or The Truant Tracked (1886) that satirically adapted Verdi's Il trovatore. A parody based on Canadian politics of that time as well as on Arthur Sullivan's H.M.S. Pinafore was William Harry Fuller's HMS Parliament, or, The Lady Who Loved a Government Clerk (1879).

Other Canadian operas written during the nineteenth century include Frederick W. Mills's Maire of St Brieux (1875), Susie Frances Harrison's three-act comic opera Pipandour (1884) and Arthur Clappé's Canada's Welcome: A Masque (1897). All of which had librettos written by F. A. Dixon. Arthur Clappé's opera was written for thirteen soloists representing different regions and people of Canada. It also featured a chorus of 100 voices and an orchestra.

== The twentieth century ==
During the twentieth century, Canada's composers were writing more operas than ever. Since the 1940s the CBC has had a big part in promoting the composition of operas by commission. As promotion, CBC has also been broadcasting new operas on their radio shows and television networks. The centennial celebrations of 1967 also led to many new operas concerning Canadian themes. The celebrations gave Canadian opera a popularity that is noticeable until today.

=== 1900–1960s ===
During the first half of the twentieth century only a few Canadian operas were known. Roberta Geddes-Harvey's La Terre Bonne, or the Land of the Maple Leaf was first performed in 1903. Joseph Vézina's operetta La Fétiche from 1912 deals with First Nations subjects like the conflict between the Iroquois and the French settlers in the early eighteenth century. J. Ulric Voyer's three-act opera L'Intendant Bigot was performed in Montreal and Quebec City in 1929.

In the 1940s, Healey Willan's Transit through Fire (1942) was broadcast by the CBC; and Eugène Lapierre's operas La Père des amours (1942) and La Vagabond de la gloire (1947) were based on the lives of Joseph Quesnel and Calixa Lavallée. Another opera of the 1940s is Graham George's Evangeline that premiered in 1948 in Kingston, Ontario.

The operas that followed in the 1950s and 60s typically continued to be short in length – mostly one-act operas were composed. Harry Somers's The Fool was written in 1953 with a libretto by Michael E. Fram. It is set in a medieval court and the four characters represent not only themselves, but also aspects of our society and psychology. The music of the opera is very diverse as it includes aspects of four different centuries: ground bass figures, chorale and motet style, tonal folk song and twelve-tone technique.

John Beckwith's Night Blooming Cereus (1958) is another example of Canadian themes in opera and a "parable of the redemptive powers of love" in a small town in Southern Ontario. It also features Southern Ontario vernacular music and texts.

During the 1960s, the construction of many new theatres and the establishment of new opera companies resulted in the production of many new Canadian operas to be performed on stage. Healey Willan's Deirdre, first composed in 1946 for a radio broadcast of the CBC, was revised and performed on stage in 1965. Richard Wagner's influence on the musical style of this work is especially recognizable in Willan's use of the leitmotif principle.

Canadian opera was also produced for broadcast on television, one example being R. Murray Schafer's Loving/Toi (1964/5). It is bilingual drama about love in four loosely connected parts, which can be performed independently. The opera very much represents the avant garde music of the 1960s.

=== 1967: Canada's centennial celebrations ===
To mark Canada's centennial year in 1967, many new operas concerning Canadian subjects were commissioned and composed. One of the best known and greatest operas in Canada until today is Harry Somers's Louis Riel. It was commissioned by the Floyd S. Chalmers Foundation and produced by the Canadian Opera Company. Due to its important role in the national celebrations of 1967, it was subsidized by the Canadian Canadian Centennial Commission, the Canada Council, and the Province of Ontario Council for the Arts. As basis for the libretto by Mavor Moore, John Coulter's play Riel: A Play in Two Parts (1950) was used. It is written in English, French, Cree and Latin, to represent the different parties that were involved in the conflict between settlers and Métis. The diverse music is full of contrast in its use of different musical traditions and further supports the notion of struggle between different cultures.

Other operas that were written for the centennial celebrations include Raymond Pannell's The Luck of Ginger Coffrey, Murray Adaskin's Grant, Warden of the Plains, Kelsey Jones's Sam Slick, Robert Turner's The Brideship, and Douglas Major's The Loyalists.

=== 1968–1990 ===
After the great success of Louis Riel and other centennial operas, works based on Canadian themes continued to grow in popularity among composers. In fact, there have never been more operas composed in Canada than after 1967 – until 1978 there were already 25 new Canadian operas. However, due to economic issues, most compositions were small in scale. A great opera, such as the heavily subsidized Louis Riel, did not happen to be composed again.

Operas based on Canadian themes, composed between 1967 and 1978, include István Anhalt's La Tourangelle (1975), Charles Wilson's Kamourska (1975), Derek Healey's Seabird Island (1977) and Samuel Dolin's Drakkar (1972).

Another popular form of opera were works specially composed for children. Examples of these are Gabriel Charpentier's An English Lesson (1968), Walter Buczynski's From the Buczynski Book of the Living (1972), Violet Archer's Sganarelle (1973), Tibor Polgar's The Glove (1973) and Paul McIntyre's work based on "The Little Red Hen" (1976).

The International Year of Canadian Music in 1986 was another celebration that induced new operas. István Anhalt's work Winthrop was composed in this context. In this opera, as before in La Tourangelle, Anhalt plays with the notion of time and combines the historical time represented in the story with the audience's contemporary time.

In the 1980s composers started to experiment with multimedia and the limits of the art form. Sometimes the audience was incorporated in the performance such as can be seen in R. Murray Schafer's Ra (1983). Other composers include Ruth Watson Henderson, and Elizabeth Raum.

== Contemporary Canadian opera ==
Contemporary Canadian composers still have to deal with economic issues that influence the scale of a newly composed operas. New operas are often funded by the Canada Council and are less elaborate than grand opera. However, opera continues to be popular among composers and audience alike. Between 1980 and 2001 as many as 57 operas were composed by Canadians.

Contemporary opera often incorporates different musical traditions and styles as well as multimedia. Productions often focus more on the drama and theatricality and use methods that can also be found in film and performance art. In the 1990s smaller opera companies such as the Queen of Puddings, Tapestry Opera and Autumn Leaf Productions in Toronto as well as Montreal's Chants Libres were established, producing many new Canadian operas. Queen of Puddings embraces their economic restrictions using smaller auditoriums to ensure a closer and more intimate connection between performers and audience.

In 1999, Queen of Puddings produced James Rolfe's opera Beatrice Chancy with a libretto by George Elliott Clarke. As many other Canadian operas, it deals with a Canadian theme of slavery that was present in Nova Scotia in the nineteenth century.

When concerning cultural roots, Canadian operas do not only deal with First Nations topics but, since Canada is a nation of immigrants, many composers have multicultural roots and base their musical works on these as well. An example is Chan Ka Nin's chamber opera Iron Road from 2001, which concerns the exploitation of Chinese workers during the construction of the trans-Canada railroad. The libretto by Mark Bromwell and George K. Wong is written in English and Cantonese and the music draws aspects from both musical traditions.

John Estacio's works Filumena (2003) and Frobisher (2007) deal with individuals of the Canadian history. Whereas Filumena is based on the only woman that was put to death in Alberta, Frobisher deals with the Elizabethan pirate Martin Frobisher but from a contemporary perspective. Estacio's Lillian Alling, with libretto by John Murrell 2010), was premiered by Vancouver Opera and told the story of a real-life adventurer who walked across the continent in the 1920s.

Other contemporary Canadian operas include Harry Somers's Mario and the Magician (1992), Bruce Mather's La princesse blanche (1993), Randolph Peters's The Golden Ass (1999), John Beckwith's Taptoo! (1999), David McIntyre's The Architect (1991), István Anhalt's Traces (1995) and Millennial Mall (2000), Sadie Buck's Bones (2001), Victor Davies's Transit of Venus (2007), Alexina Louie's The Scarlet Princess (2002) and Mulroney (2011), Ramona Luengen's "Naomi's Road (2005), and James Rolfe's Orpheus and Euridice (2003), Rosa (2004), Elijah's Kite (2006), Swan (2006), Aeneas and Dido (2007),Inês (2009), and Airat Ichmouratov's The Man Who Laughs (2023).

The field of chamber opera is opening further prospects for new Canadian opera. One of the most successful Canadian chamber operas is Nigredo Hotel (1992), composed by Nic Gotham to a libretto by Ann-Marie MacDonald. More recently, City Opera of Vancouver has commissioned and premiered Fallujah (2012) by Tobin Stokes and Heather Raffo; Pauline", by Margaret Atwood and Tobin Stokes (2014); and, has announced Missing (2017) by First Nations playwright Marie Clements.
