= Pacific Opera Victoria =

Pacific Opera Victoria is a professional Canadian opera company in Victoria, British Columbia. It designs, builds, and stages original opera productions at the Royal Theatre with the Victoria Symphony. The company also presents smaller scale works and community programming at the Baumann Centre.

== History ==
Pacific Opera Victoria emerged from the Vancouver Island Opera Society, which staged its first production, The Marriage of Figaro, in November 1976. In 1979, the company adopted a new name, the Pacific Opera Association, and mounted its first production as a professional opera company – The Merry Wives of Windsor by Carl Otto Nicolai. In 1987 the company was renamed Pacific Opera Victoria.

By 1990 Pacific Opera Victoria had moved from two annual productions to three. After expanding to four mainstage productions each season from 2009 to 2012, it reverted to three productions in the Royal Theatre, complemented by chamber operas and concerts in other venues, including the Baumann Centre.

In response to the COVID-19 epidemic, Pacific Opera increased its online programming and began to produce and record chamber and concert works for digital distribution, including films of The Italian Lesson and Bon Appétit! by Lee Hoiby and The Garden of Alice by Elizabeth Raum.

Pacific Opera's founding artistic director, Timothy Vernon, C.M., LL.D (Hon), DMus (Hon), led the company for 43 years until his retirement in 2023. He conducted most of the company's productions and curated an approach to repertoire that encompassed classic favourites as well as lesser known works, ranging from Baroque to contemporary operas, plus new commissions, co-productions, and collaborations with other companies.

As of 2024, Pacific Opera's leadership includes CEO Ian Rye, Artistic Director Brenna Corner, and Principal Conductor Giuseppe Pietraroia.

== Facilities ==
=== Royal Theatre ===
Pacific Opera's productions were originally staged in the 772-seat McPherson Playhouse. By the 1990s audiences had grown to the point that a larger venue was required, and the company began to move its productions to the 1400-seat Royal Theatre, which is now the main venue for Pacific Opera's mainstage opera productions.

=== Baumann Centre ===
The opening of the Baumann Centre in 2015 provided Pacific Opera with its own venue for small-scale chamber productions as well as opera rehearsals, concerts, artist training, and community programming.

The Baumann Centre's main space is Wingate Studio, a 2,500 sq ft performance space. The studio's ceiling features a 1000 sq ft cedar installation that functions as an acoustic canopy. The installation, called Mind, Body, and Spirit, was created and donated by Kwagiulth and Coast Salish artist Carey Newman (Hayalthkin’geme), a former opera singer. The Baumann Centre also houses Pacific Opera's administration and box office and is used by other community groups, including the Greater Victoria Youth Orchestra and the Victoria Children's Choir.

=== The Opera Shop ===
Pacific Opera Victoria is notable for constructing its own sets and costumes and retaining its own production facility. In its early days the company had to construct its own sets because the small stage of the McPherson Playhouse meant that renting sets from other companies was not practicable.

As it grew, the company continued to build its own productions and also began to rent its productions to other companies. Sets, costumes, and props for each production are created by a team of local theatre professionals in the company's 10,000 sq ft warehouse space, The Opera Shop.

== Notable Productions ==
Pacific Opera Victoria has staged more than a dozen Canadian and world premières, including four commissioned or co-commissioned operas.

=== Commissioned and Co-commissioned Productions ===
- The Flight of the Hummingbird, Music by Maxime Goulet, libretto by Michael Nicoll Yahgulanaas and Barry Gilson. The opera is based on Yahgulanaas' book Flight of the Hummingbird: A Parable for the Environment.

- Co-commission and co-production with Vancouver Opera.
- World première performances and school tour January to March 2020. Online broadcast May to August 2020.
- British Columbia School Tour March to May 2024.

- Missing. Music by Brian Current, libretto by Marie Clements.

- Co-Commission and world première co-production with City Opera Vancouver.
- World première November 2017 at the York Theatre, Vancouver, followed by performances at the Baumann Centre in Victoria.
- Missing was remounted in November 2019 with performances in Victoria, Regina, and Prince George. Pacific Opera presented these performances in partnership with the Victoria Native Friendship Centre, Prince George Native Friendship Centre, Regina Treaty/Status Indian Services, Regina Symphony Orchestra, and Prince George Symphony Orchestra.
- The USA première of Missing was presented by Anchorage Opera in March 2023.

- Les Feluettes. Music by Kevin March, libretto by Michel Marc Bouchard, based on his play Les Feluettes (Lilies in English).

- Co-commission and world première co-production with Opéra de Montréal. Staged in Montreal in May 2016 and in Victoria in April 2017.
- Les Feluettes was remounted at Edmonton Opera in October 2017.

- Mary's Wedding. Music by Andrew Paul MacDonald, libretto by Stephen Massicotte based on Massicotte's play of the same name.

- Commissioned by Pacific Opera Victoria.
- World première November 2011.
- In November 2015 Pacific Opera presented a re-imagined one-hour version for community and school performances.

=== Canadian Stage Premières ===
- February 2025: The Little Prince by Rachel Portman to a libretto by Nicholas Wright
- February 2023: The Birds (Die Vögel) by Walter Braunfels.
- February 2020: Flight by Jonathan Dove and April De Angelis.
- November 2017: Rattenbury by Tobin Stokes. Staged première, in collaboration with The Other Guys Theatre Company.
- February 2010: Capriccio by Richard Strauss.
- April 2008: Regina by Marc Blitzstein.
- February 2007: Daphne by Richard Strauss.
- February 2004: The Tempest by Lee Hoiby
- February 2001: The Taming of the Shrew by Vittorio Giannini.
- February 2000: Erewhon by Louis Applebaum and Mavor Moore. Canadian and world première.
- February 1996: The Love of Three Kings by Italo Montemezzi.
- February 1994: Der Freischütz by Carl Maria von Weber.
