= Layla Al-Attar =

Iraqi artist and painter (1944–1993)

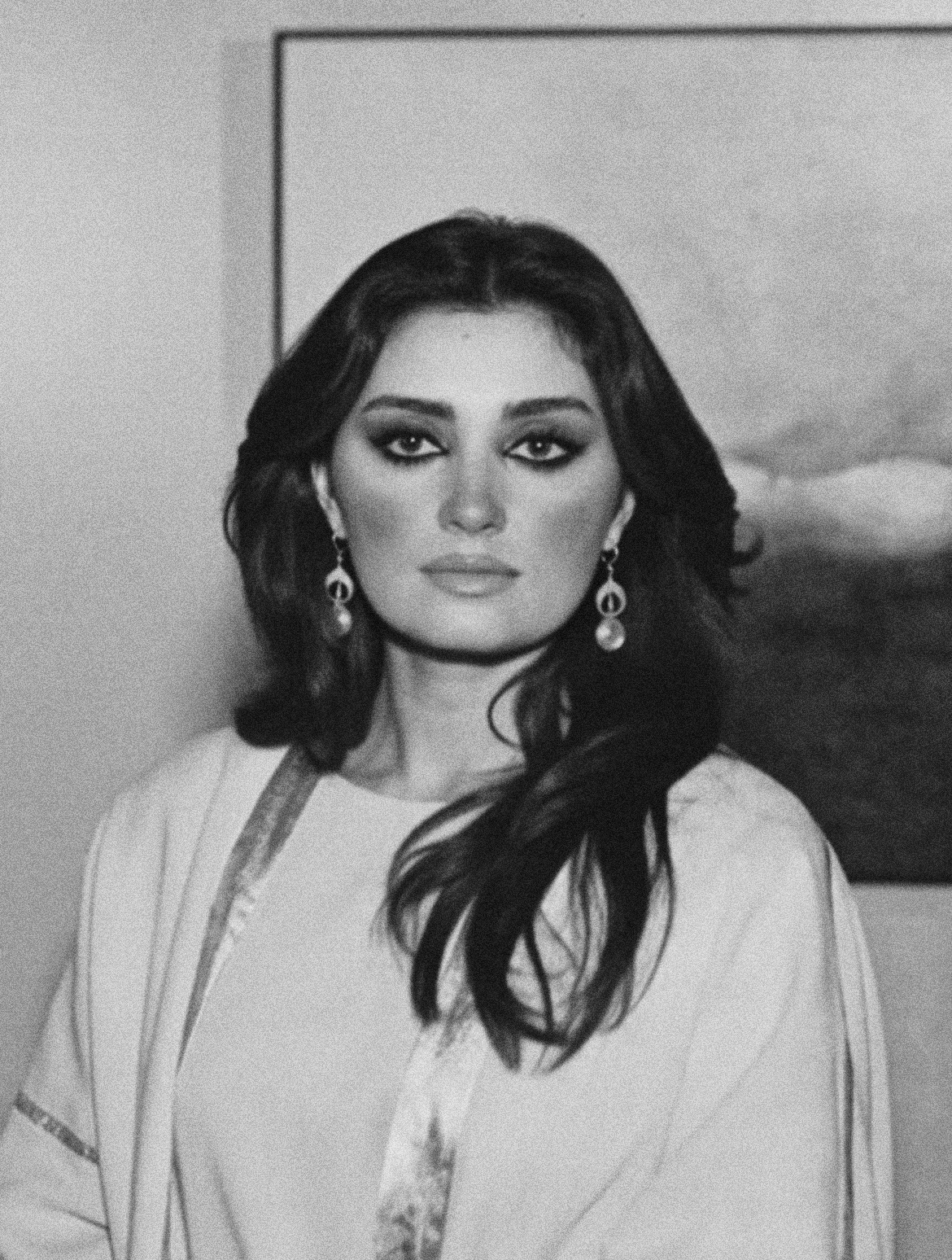
- Born: Sept 12, 1944; Adhamiyah, Baghdad, Iraq
- Died: June 27, 1993 (aged 49); Baghdad, Iraq

Layla Al-Attar (Arabic: ليلى العطار; Sept 12, 1944 – June 27, 1993) was an Iraqi artist and painter who became the director of the Iraqi National Art Museum. Through her art, al-Attar expressed the importance of women in all spheres of society, and she is credited for "substantial contributions to the advancement of women's rights".

On 27 June 1993, Al-Attar, her husband, and their housekeeper were killed by a U.S. missile attack on the Iraqi Intelligence main building which was just behind her house, ordered by U.S. president Bill Clinton.

== Life and career ==
Al-Attar graduated from the Academy of Fine Arts in Baghdad in 1965, and was among the first female graduates from that program. She became the director of the Center for National Art (now the Iraqi Museum of Modern Art), a post she held until her death in 1993.

Al-Attar held five one-woman shows in Iraq and took part in all national and other collective exhibitions held in the country and abroad. Al-Attar also took part in the Kuwait Biennial (1973), the first Arab Biennial (Baghdad 1974), the second Arab Biennial (1976), the Kuwait Biennial (1981), and won the Golden Sail Medal in the Cairo Biennial (1984).

Al-Attar's artwork depicted women, forests, and references to Iraqi heritage, including the ancient King Gilgamesh, Mesopotamia, and the Garden of Eden, which was believed to have been located in Mesopotamia (modern-day Iraq).

Her sister, Suad al-Attar, is also an artist who now lives and works in London.

== Death ==
On 27 June 1993, Al-Attar, her husband, and their housekeeper were killed by a U.S. missile attack on the Iraqi Intelligence main building, which was just behind her house, ordered by U.S. president Bill Clinton. The building was hit by 24 rockets. Two misfired and hit their house accidentally, per her son's testimony. The attack also blinded Al-Attar's daughter. There are some rumours that the misfire was intended due to an unflattering mosaic of President George H. W. Bush, possibly designed by Al-Attar, laid onto the floor at the entrance to the Al-Rashid Hotel in Baghdad. Additionally, some allege that Al-Attar used pieces of her destroyed home during the American bombings in 1991 to create this controversial mosaic. The idea was that nobody would be able to get into the hotel, where most foreign visitors to Iraq stayed in the 1990s, without stepping on Bush's face. The mosaic was removed when Baghdad was captured on 9 April 2003.

It is contested that Al-Attar either designed or oversaw the commissioning of the Bush mosaic, with Al Jazeera reporting that she was the designer of the mosaic. Al-Attar's artwork did not include ceramics nor portraits but others claim she commissioned an artist to do it. The Wall Street Journal pointed out that the mosaic is signed by two marble cutters, brothers Mohsen and Majid Tabani. However, many believe that she either designed the mosaic, commissioned it, or at least oversaw its production. Her successor as director of the Saddam Art Center (also known as the Fine Art Center in Baghdad) Mukhallad al-Mukhtar maintained that she oversaw the work on it.

Her death was met with an angry response in Baghdad.

== Legacy ==
The character Layal in the play Nine Parts of Desire is based on Al-Attar. Author Heather Raffo, stated that she saw a painting by Al-Attar in an art gallery and was curious about it. This inspired her to write the play. While the Al-Attar character is central in it, the character is written as fictional and does not depict any specific relation to the real Layla Al Attar

Kris Kristofferson dedicated and wrote a song about Al-Attar, called "The Circle", which appears on his live album Broken Freedom Song: Live from San Francisco. In the live introduction to the song on that CD, Kristofferson explains that it covers both the death of Layla Al-Attar and the desaparecidos, the 30,000 Argentines who were secretly arrested and murdered by the Argentinian military dictatorship. He states that he linked the two as examples of governments taking no responsibility for the deaths of non-combatants.

Marta Gomez later covered the song on a tribute album, The Pilgrim. A celebration of Kris Kristofferson, adding a verse in Spanish, later, she wrote a song named Layla inspired by her.

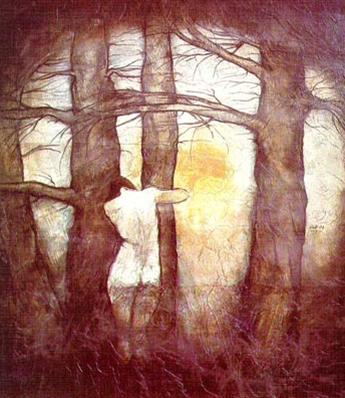
Untitled painting by al-Attar

== See also ==
- Iraqi art
- Islamic art
- List of Iraqi artists
