= Joachim Ulric Voyer =

Canadian opera composer

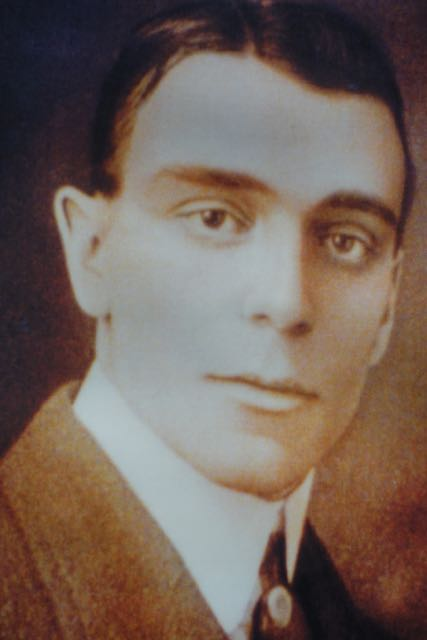
- Born: 5 July 1892; Saint-Roch, Quebec City, Quebec, Canada
- Died: 8 January 1935 (aged 42); Quebec City, Quebec, Canada
- Occupation: Opera composer
- Website: http://ulricvoyercompositeurdoperacanadien.qc.ca/

Joachim Ulric Voyer (5 July 1892 – 8 January 1935) was a Canadian opera composer. His L'Intendant Bigot, created in Montreal in 1929, was one of the first Canadian operas.

== Early life ==
J.-Ulric Voyer was not a professional musician. He worked for 21 years as an advertising agent for J.-B. Renaud. He was artistic director of radio station CHRC.

He studied at Wallace. He studied musical composition with M. Lefrançois, organist of St-Roch, and studied the piano with M. Hudson. In Montreal, he studied the organ and harmony with Léon Dessane and Auguste Descarries.

== L'Intendant Bigot ==
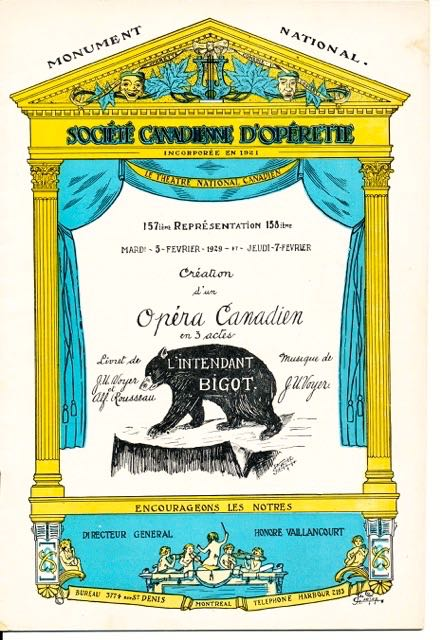
L'Intendant Bigot – Program (Montreal 1929)

L'Intendant Bigot was created under the patronage of the Honorable Athanase David, provincial secretary, by the Société canadienne d'opérette established by Honoré Vaillancourt, his managing director and M. Albert Roberval, art director, who managed this opera. The opera premiered February 5, 1929 at the Monument National de Montréal "in front of a record attendance". Three additional sold-out performances were mounted at the Auditorium de Québec in the presence of celebrities including Sir Lomer Gouin, and Madam Louis- Alexandre Taschereau, wife of the Prime Minister. The opera was under the direction of Edmond-J. Trudel and the title role was entrusted to Arnold Becker of New York's San Carlo Opera.

The opera evokes the years of oppression endured by the people under Governor Bigot, the last governor of New France, and his accomplices who were repatriated to France, where they were sentenced to stiff penalties for corruption and had their properties dispossessed. The opera makes a reference to "this period which extends from 1755 to 1760, when François Bigot, governor of the law, the police and finance had absolute power to increase his authoritarianism, to display his sumptuous taste as a big player and bon vivant, and, according to the appetites which he wanted to satisfy, to even turn to crime to denounce the darkest plots".

=== Synopsis ===
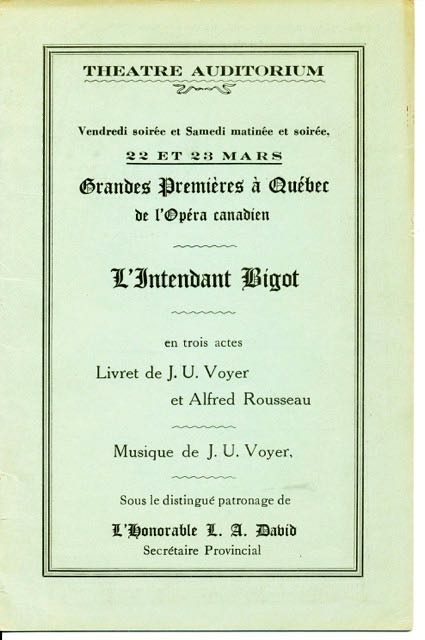
L'intendant Bigot – Program (Quebec 1929)

J.-U. Voyer and Alfred Rousseau's libretto, featured François Bigot, the last governor of New France and his mistress Madam Péan, Angélique Renaud d'Avène des Méloises (nicknamed The Pompadour of Quebec, wife of Michel Jean Hugues Péan, the governor's right-hand man as well as the Marquis Gaston of St-Germain.

The show takes place in Quebec in 1758.

Fictitious characters provide dramatic historic and symbolic aspects. The characters and their intrigues:

- Gemma, Dumas' daughter and Raymond's fiancée, symbolizes the image of France, which was treacherously killed in our country. (Role played by Marie-Rose Descarries in Montreal and Quebec)
- Raymond, Gemma's hunter fiancé, symbolizes the suffering and rebellious people, who swears to one day take revenge. (Role played by P. Trottier in Montreal and Quebec)
- Gaston de St-Germain, marquis, plays the dignified representative of the nobility. (Role played by Charles-E. Brodeur in Montreal and Paul Trottier in Quebec)
- Dumas, Gemma's father, symbolizes the oppressed people (Role played by Émile Lamarre in Montreal and J.E.A. Cloutier in Quebec)
- Madame Péan, Bigot's friend and mistress, is the Canadian Pompadour (Role played by Jeanne Maubourg-Roberval in Montreal and Madam Dupuis-Becker in Quebec)
- Rosine, the Marquis de Saint Germain's lover, symbolizes the flower of the nobility (Role played by Caro Lamoureux in Montreal and in Quebec)
- Bigot, also known as the Ours Noir, symbolizes the black stain on our glorious history (Role played by Arnold Becker in Montreal and Quebec)

(Toinon, Alice, three bandits, nobles, soldiers, peasants, servants, hunters and the people complete this casting and constitute the choirs)

— Joachim Ulric Voyer

"Can this work, writes J.-Ulric Voyer, if it communicates to the listener bitter regret at the sight of this innocent victim who had deserved to be happy with us always, he clearly understands, also, that France has not died a natural death, but they killed her, in spite of us. A finale without this innocent victim would have been easily found. But history is there, that a few days after this legend, was a beautiful and greatest victim. The separation was cruel, so cruel, that after 168 years, at the heart of all French-Canadians, there is still a bitter regret, a hope, an I remember... "

=== Libretto ===
==== Act One ====
The first act is set in 1758, on the côte de Beaupré, at Bigot's hunting lodge. He is in the company of the Marquis de St-Germain, to whom he owes a large sum. The Marquis agrees to erase this debt if Bigot succeeds in convincing Gemma to marry him. But Gemma loves Raymond, a young hunter, and refuses Bigot's request.

==== Act Two ====
The second act is set in the guest house of Dumas, the father of Gemma, where Bigot and the marquis try in vain to convince Gemma. By leaving, the marquis forgets a glove which Raymond finds and makes a fit of jealousy and parts from Gemma.

==== Act Three ====
In the third act, a party is organized at Bigot's home, and Gemma is invited. Bigot hires 3 bandits to kidnap her and bring her by force to his house. During the kidnapping, Gemma is fatally injured and one of the arrested bandits reveals the plot. Furious, a crowd captures Bigot and crushes him under a bench.

=== Reception ===
The five performances of the opera L'Intendant Bigot were sold out, and were well received by the press. Several artists stressed the qualities of the work, including Wilfrid Pelletier, conductor of New York's Metropolitan Opera, who said to the author: "you possess a theatrical writing, and it is an extremely rare thing, not only in the United States, but in Europe nowadays". M. Honoré Vaillancourt, managing director of the Société canadienne d'opérette, considered the author to be "the first Canadian to produce a lyric work set on stage in the form of an opera ". Arnold Becker of New York's San Carlo Opera underlined that the author "possesses the so-called extramusical faculties, without which any composer, however capable he may be, even Schubert, would be incapable to make his plays triumph." The work, however, raised in the pages of the magazine La Lyre in May 1929, much controversy initiated by recognized professional artists, forcing the editorial committee to intervene." He wrote, "Unfortunately, personal arguments, completely unrelated to the music, were presented. [] we have never said that M. Voyer, self-taught, produced a masterpiece, no more than we said that M. Voyer gave, in his score, trips to the rules of the musical prosody."

=== Rediscovery ===
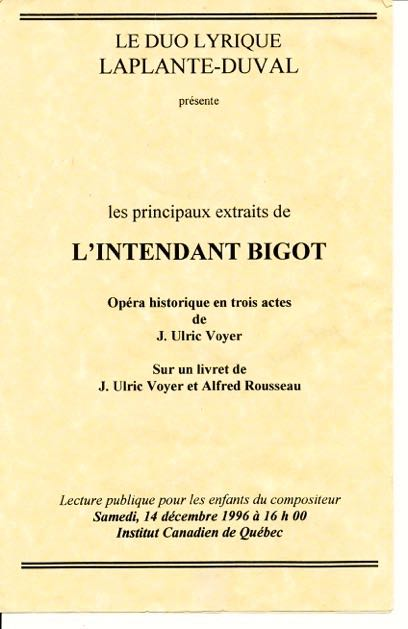
L'Intendant Bigot – Program (Québec 1996)

The opera was rediscovered in 1996 At the Institut canadien de Québec. 75 of the composer's descendants and friends watched eleven extracts performed by Bruno Laplante and France Duval, accompanied by Hélène Marceau on the piano.

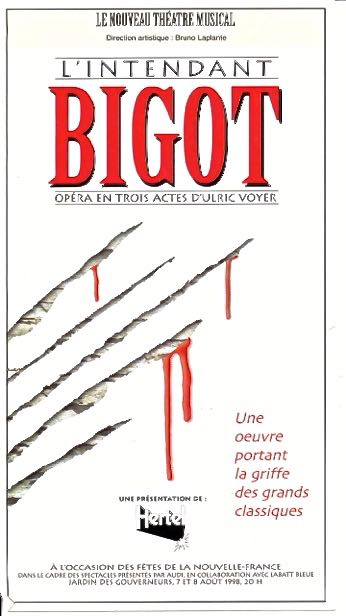
L'Intendant Bigot – Program (Québec 1998)

On August 7, 1998, at the Jardin des Gouverneurs in Old Quebec, 800 to 1000 people listened to a concert version. It was part of the Fêtes de la Nouvelle-France.

The cast included twenty singers under the direction of Bruno Laplante accompanied by 25 musicians from the Quebec Symphony Orchestra under the direction of Gilles Auger. The main performers were Manuel Blais, baritone, Réginald Côté, a tenor, France Duval, a soprano, Benoît Gendron, a tenor, Bruno Laplante, baritone, Line Malenfant, soprano and Sébastien Ouellet, baritone. The performers were in costume.

The performances were narrated by Jacques Boulanger.

Twenty members of the Société lyrique de la Nouvelle Beauce formed the chorus.

=== Recordings and publications ===
In 1929, two excerpts of L'Intendant Bigot were recorded for the Starr label: "Romance du marquis " was sung by C.E. Brodeur and " Dans un petit village " by Marie-Rose Descarries. " In less than two months, wrote the editorial staff of the magazine La Lyre, more than ONE THOUSAND copies of the single " Dans un petit village ", were sold, sung so sweetly by Miss Marie-Rose Descarries. After 26 years in the music business in Montreal, we believe that this is a sales record that has never been achieved by Canadian work, during this period "[26].

On October 30, 1929, at Steinway Hall, soprano Audrie Rubanny, accompanied by the pianist Edgar Goodaire, performed "Dans un petit village" in her recital.

In 1997, the single "Ô mon ami, veuille le dire encore " was recorded by the Laplante-Duval duo on the CD l'Opérette française. The same excerpt is incorporated into their recital and was sung on their European tour.

Besides the publication of the libretto, nothing was published from this work by the author during his lifetime.

In 2000 the Nouveau théâtre musical in collaboration with the Société des amis d'Ulric Voyer published the score and arrangements for voice and piano. The Nouveau théâtre musical also published in 2007, a few vocal scores: "Ronde de l'Ours Noir" for bass voice and piano, "Quel sublime décor" for baritone and piano, "Dans un petit village" for soprano and piano and "Dans l'abandon, les noirs regrets" for tenor and piano.

== Other works ==
- La duchesse en sabots: this one-act comic opera, featuring 45 extras, was performed on November 8 and 9, 1920 for the benefit of the parish church of Saint François d' Assise, in Quebec
- Petit Mouton: composed between 1920 and 1923, this comic opera in 4 acts was never created. A 144-page manuscript of orchestration is kept in the family archives, as well as some violin and voice scores.
- Triste réalité: on April 10 and 11, 1923, at the Académie de St-Sauveur, the dramatic 3 act work "Triste réalité", was performed at the Académie de St-Sauveur. The scene takes place in Saint-Sauveur (electoral district), in Quebec City and is interpreted by the Cercle dramatique Legault.
- Jean-Marie: on the same occasion, excerpts of the opera Jean-Marie, composed by J.-Ulric Voyer, were also presented. The libretto was written in association with Alfred Rousseau. François – Xavier Mercier, the tenor who directed this opera, remarked that " the plot is good, the scenes are well organised and the music is of an originality and a surprising truth. It is a real opera which I do not hesitate, he wrote, to place next to well known works.
- Mademoiselle de Lanaudière : this comic opera in 3 acts and 4 scenes was composed in 1930, but was never performed because of the untimely death of the composer. What survives is the libretto written by Henri Deyglun and the orchestration revised by G.-E. Lefebvre. A 205 page manuscript kept by Bibliothèque et Archives nationales du Québec and a 333-page manuscript kept in the family archives.

=== Published scores ===
At the beginning of his career, some scores were published, among whom "Si vous m'aimez un peu", a melody dedicated to A. B. (Alice Bédard), and "Prends garde à l'amour – Valse" published in 1913. In 1914, "Si tu savais" was published by John T. Hall Music and a sung waltz dedicated to Miss Alice Bédard "Je te dirais – Je t'aime" was published by the Éditions Le passe-temps of Montreal.

== Death ==
Voyer died unexpectedly at age 42, when he was struck by pulmonary congestion. He was survived by his wife, Alice Bédard and fifteen children, the youngest was nine months old.

On September 14, 2006, an epigraph, in memory of the composer, was affixed to the facade of the house he inhabited at 170 13th Street, in the Limoilou neighborhood of Quebec City.
