= Des Moines Metro Opera =

Opera company in Indianola, Iowa, US

- Opera company
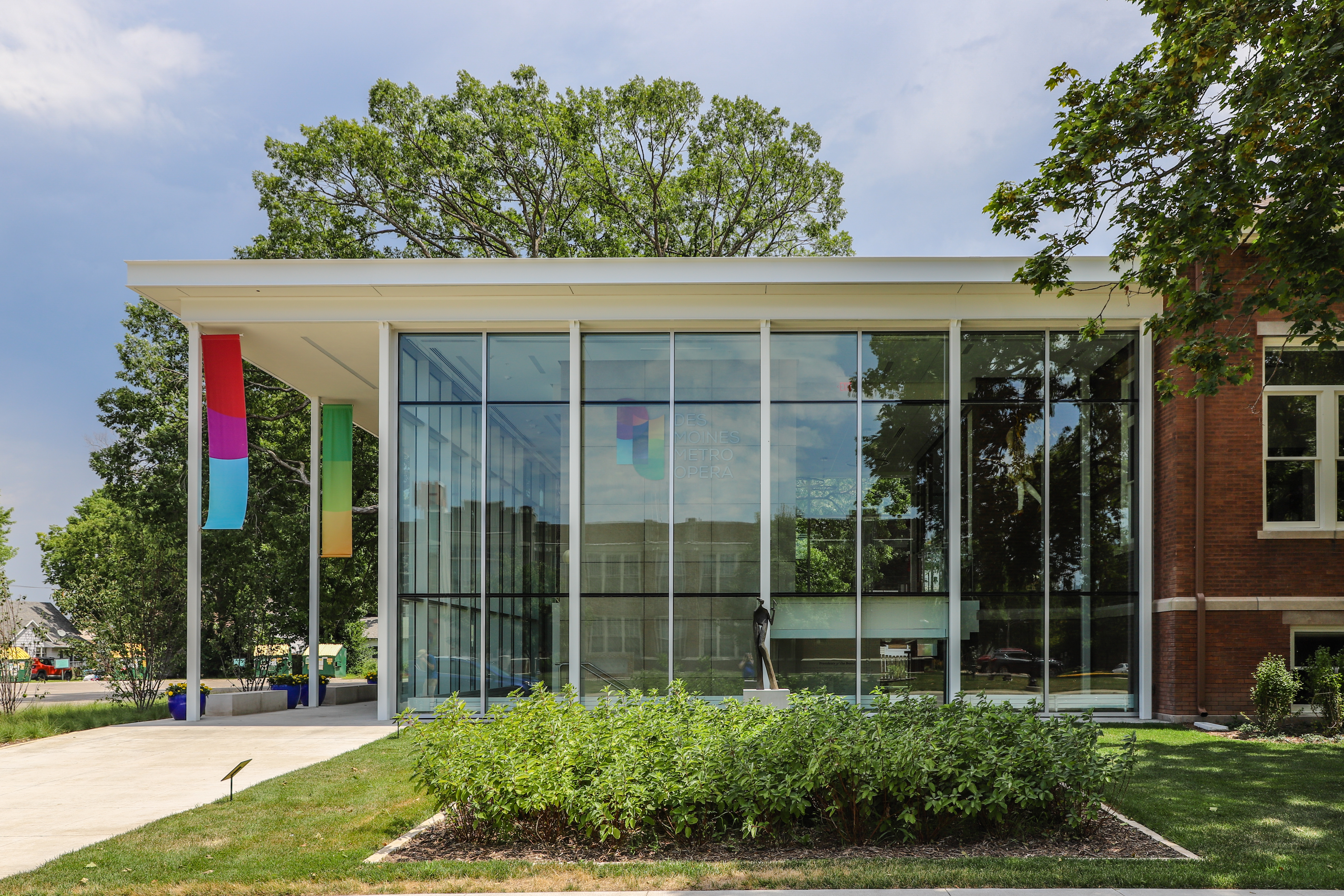
- Des Moines Metro Opera main office at the Indianola Carnegie Library
- Founded: 1973; 53 years ago
- Location: Indianola, Iowa
- Website: desmoinesmetroopera.org

Des Moines Metro Opera (DMMO) is an American opera company based in Indianola, Iowa. Founded in 1973 by Robert L. Larsen and Douglas Duncan, the company presents an annual summer opera festival at the Blank Performing Arts Center on the campus of Simpson College. Its productions are performed in repertory and are staged in an intimate 467-seat theater. Michael Egel has served as general and artistic director since 2013 and artistic director since 2010, and David Neely was appointed music director and principal conductor in 2012.

The company has received national and international critical attention for its programming and artistic scale. In a 2025 profile, The New York Times described Des Moines Metro Opera as "one of the country’s most ambitious and successful smaller companies," noting its presentation of large-scale works in a small venue. In a 2024 review, The New Yorker described the company as "one of America’s boldest smaller companies," highlighting its adventurous repertory and the intimacy of its performances. In 2024, the company was named a finalist for Festival of the Year at the International Opera Awards, the only American company nominated in that category.

In addition to its summer festival, Des Moines Metro Opera operates programs including the OPERA Iowa educational touring troupe and the Frank R. Brownell III Apprentice Artist Program, which provides training and performance opportunities for emerging artists.

== History ==
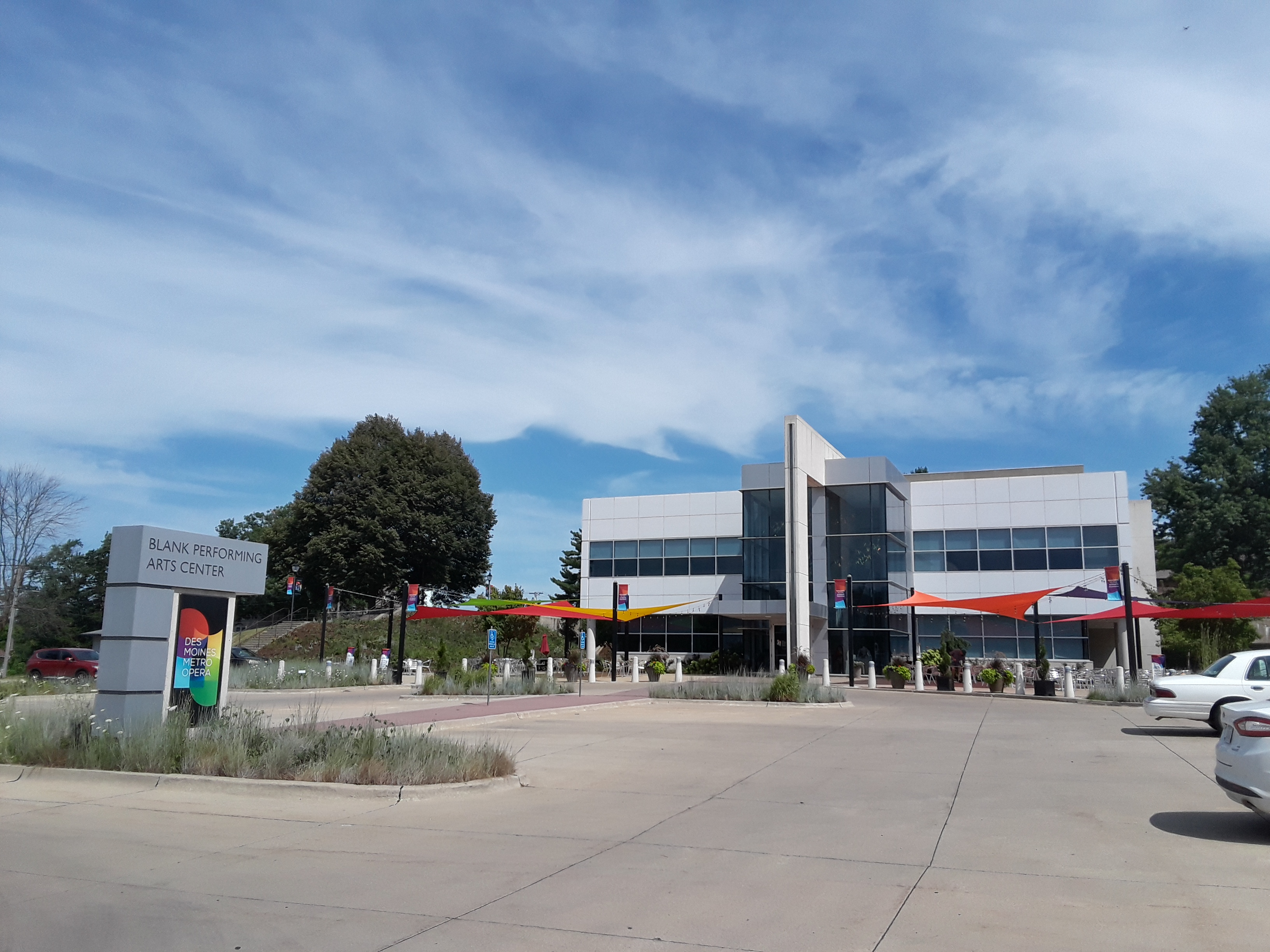
The Blank Performing Arts Center at Simpson College is the company's main performance venue

Des Moines Metro Opera was founded in 1973 by Simpson College music professors Robert L. Larsen and Douglas Duncan. Larsen had previously founded the Des Moines Civic Opera, which performed for two seasons at Hoyt Sherman Place in downtown Des Moines. He was also involved in the construction of Simpson College's Blank Performing Arts Center, named after Des Moines businessman Abraham Harry Blank, which opened in 1971.

The company's initial season was produced in the Blank Performing Arts Center at a cost of $22,000 (equivalent to $130,000 in 2024), and featured Larsen as the director and conductor of three productions: Albert Herring, La rondine, and a double-bill of The Medium and Arthur Benjamin's Prima Donna. All four operas were sung in English, and presented with contemporary stagings. The inaugural season began a longstanding tradition of the company employing early-career singers to develop their careers.

By the early 1980s, the company had grown significantly, while continuing its core format of three English-language operas at Simpson College. It also staged additional performances at the Des Moines Civic Center, such as a 1984 production of Aida that featured live elephants and camels, and added a statewide music education program during the winter season. The company promoted itself as a contrast to other regional opera companies, airing television commercials in 1986 that promoted its focus on younger singers and English-language works. That year, the DMMO premiered its first commissioned work, Lee Hoiby's The Tempest.

Duncan sang some roles in the DMMO's early seasons and later took on the administrative leadership of the company, including a 1983 fundraising campaign that involved his personal weight loss. He led the company's administration until his death in 1988, at the age of 37. After Duncan's death, Larsen took on the administrative leadership of the company, which he continued until his retirement in 2009.

The company's first performance of an opera in a language other than English was Tosca in 1998, at the Civic Center in Des Moines. Critic Brian Kellow wrote in a 2003 Opera News review that Larsen's leadership of the company had given it a "reputation for having a unified tone and feel," and commented that Larsen attended every audition. Kellow noted Larsen's focus on the smallest of details in music, scenic design, and costuming, and argued that the company's success was aided by its large-scale apprenticeship program.

Des Moines Metro Opera's budget rose to $2.2 million in 2013, as the company continued to expand. Larsen retired in 2009, and Michael Egel took over the role of artistic director in 2010. Egel took over the company's administrative leadership in 2013. Egel started at the company in 1994, and rose through its ranks, and by the company's 35th anniversary in 2007, Larsen reportedly called Egel his "right-hand man." Under Egel's leadership, the company expanded its production values and featured more well-known singers.

In a 2025 profile, The New York Times described Des Moines Metro Opera as "one of the country’s most ambitious and successful smaller companies," noting its reputation for presenting large-scale productions in an intimate theater setting.

Des Moines Metro Opera’s orchestra is represented by the American Federation of Musicians Local 75, and in 2022 the company voluntarily recognized the American Guild of Musical Artists (AGMA) as the union representing its stage managers and assistant stage managers.

== Labor practices and response ==
In September 2025, The Des Moines Register published an investigative series by reporter Tyler Jett examining working conditions at Des Moines Metro Opera, including allegations from former employees regarding long hours and workplace practices. The reporting referenced historical examples, including a 1978 Iowa PBS broadcast that depicted extended rehearsal hours.

In a follow-up report published in February 2026, the Register reported that the company had taken steps to address staffing and workload concerns, including adding production staff and implementing overtime pay at 1.5 times the regular rate for hours worked beyond 40 per week.
