= Royal Tulip Al Rasheed Hotel =

Hotel in Baghdad, Iraq

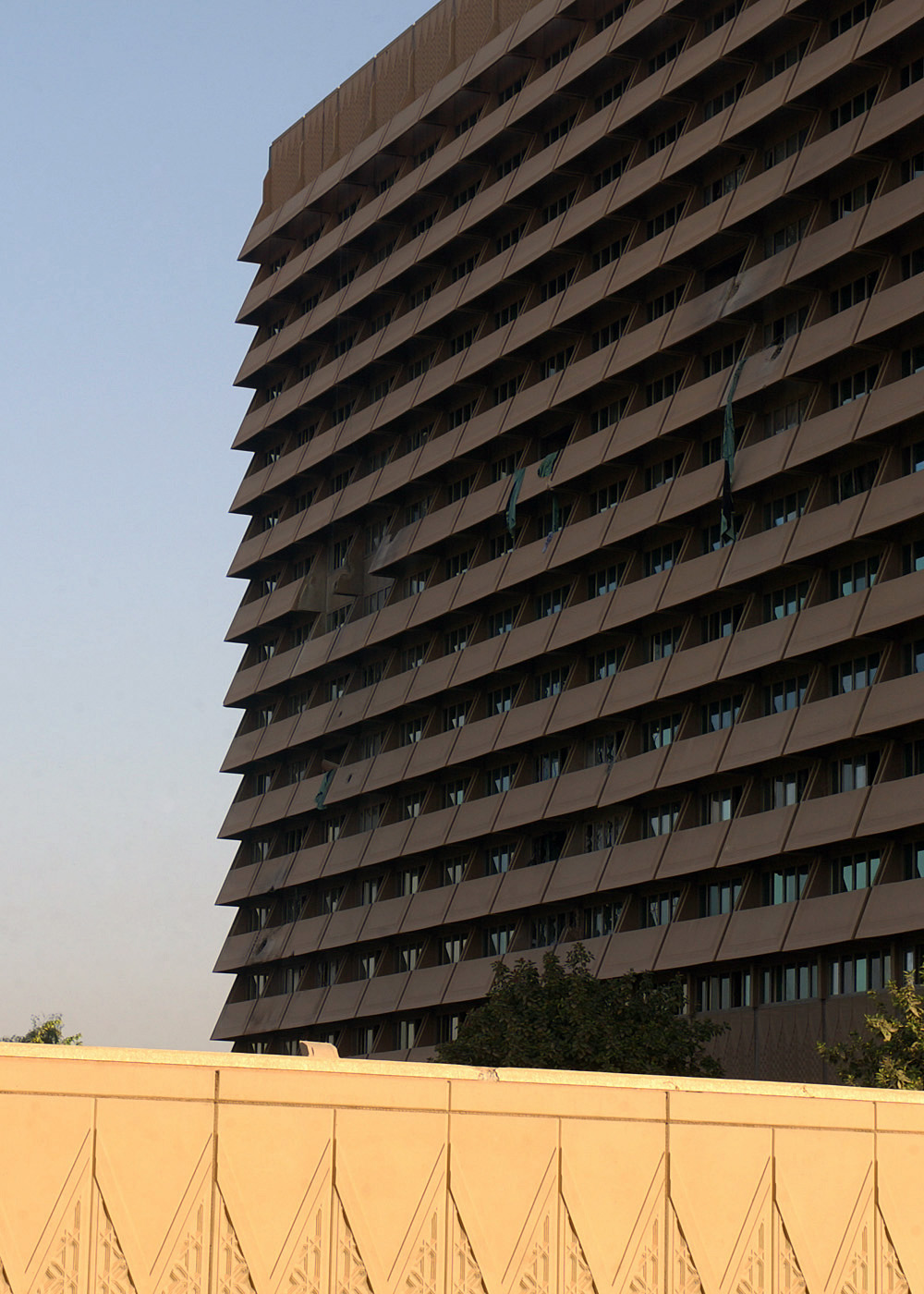

- Location in Baghdad

General information
- Location: Baghdad, Iraq
- Coordinates: 33°18′58″N 44°23′21″E
- Operator: Golden Tulip Hotels

Technical details
- Floor count: 18

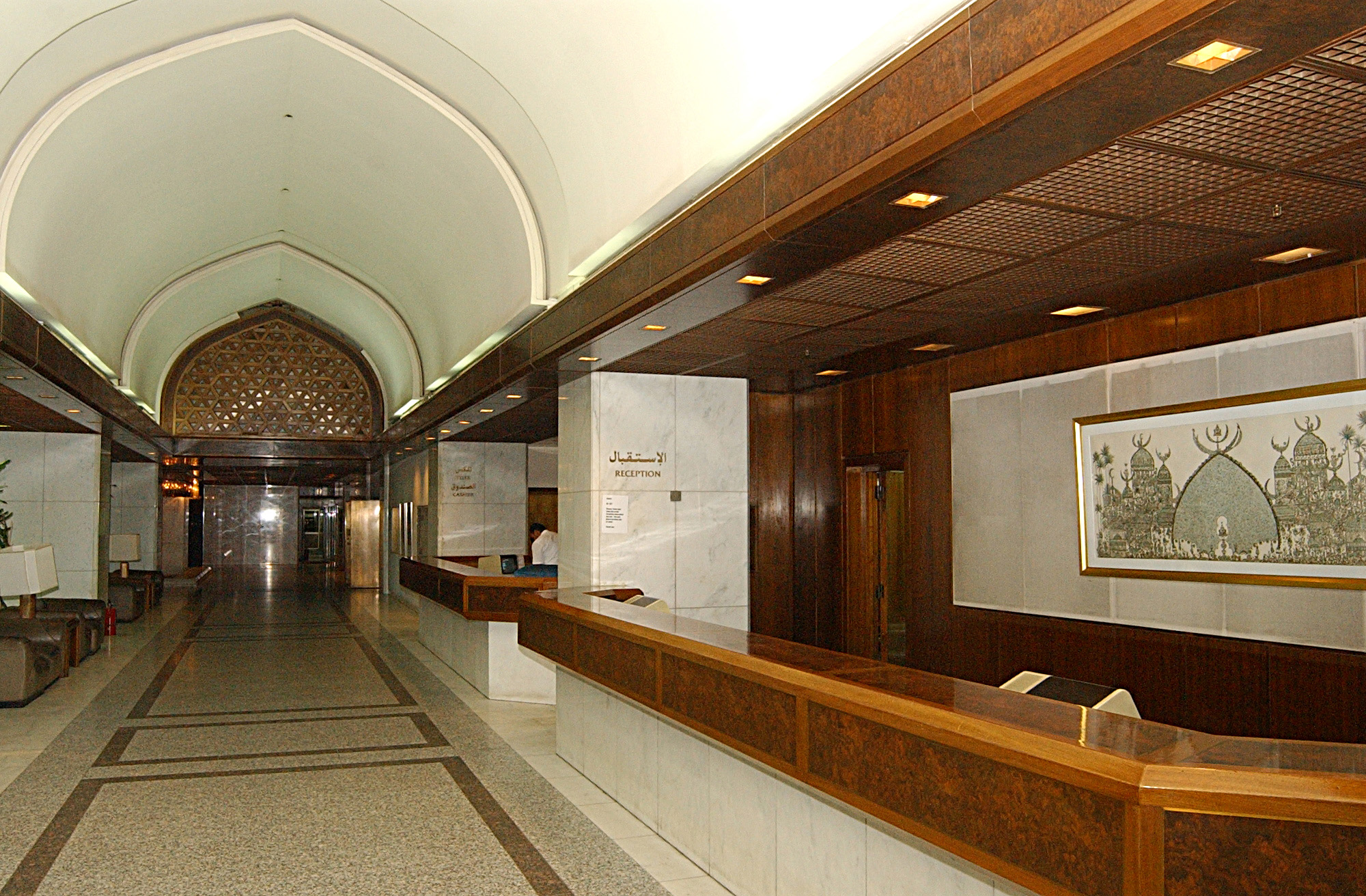
Reception desk

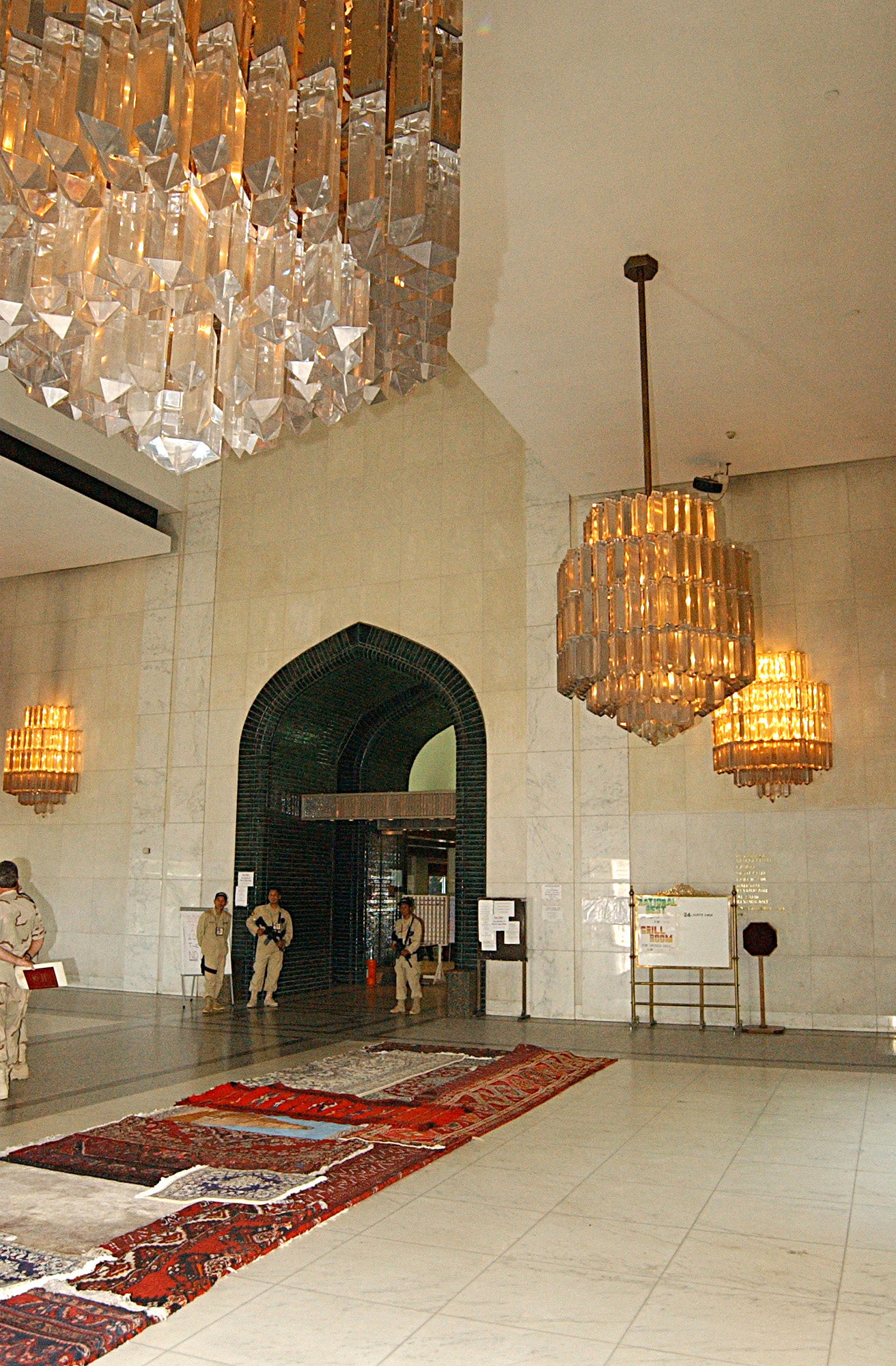
Lobby

The Royal Tulip Al Rasheed Hotel (sometimes spelled Al-Rashid; Arabic: فندق الرشيد) is an 18-story hotel in Baghdad, Iraq, often visited by journalists and media personnel due to its location within Baghdad's Green Zone. It is named after the eighth-century Caliph Harun Al-Rashid. It has been a focal point in a number of conflicts in the region, most recently the 2026 Iran war.

== History ==
The Rashid Hotel opened in 1982. Its bar was frequented by Iraqi president Saddam Hussein's sons Uday Hussein and Qusay Hussein.

The hotel opened in the midst of the Iran–Iraq War. In an attempt to show the world that Iraq was stable and safe, Saddam Hussein planned to host an international Non-Aligned Movement conference in the hotel in 1983. Iranian general and fighter pilot Abbas Doran led an air attack on Baghdad to prove Saddam wrong and hit civilian targets in the city. When his F-4 Phantom fighter plane was badly hit, rather than ejecting and being taken prisoner, he crashed his fighter jet into a square near the hotel, killing a civilian. As a result, the conference was relocated to New Delhi rather than Baghdad, and Doran is revered today as a legendary pilot and martyr in Iran.

The hotel gained worldwide fame during the 1991 Gulf War when CNN conducted their newscasts from the hotel, propelling the network's senior war correspondent Peter Arnett to fame. Between the Gulf War and the 2003 invasion of Iraq, the building was the main housing facility for Western businessmen and diplomats, as well as foreign press.

A tile mosaic depicting U.S. President George H. W. Bush was installed on the floor of the lobby after the Gulf War. This was intended to force any visitors to walk over his face to enter the hotel (a serious insult in Arab culture). On 17 January 1993, the hotel was damaged in a U.S. missile strike and the attack resulted in civilian casualties. The artist, Layla Al-Attar, who created the mosaic died along with her husband and housekeeper when another stray U.S. missile hit her house. After the invasion in 2003, the mosaic was smashed by U.S. soldiers, who left a portrait of Saddam behind.

After the invasion, the hotel was converted into a base for the Coalition forces and the American military. On 26 October 2003 28, 68 mm and 85 mm Katyusha rockets were fired at and struck the hotel, killing Lieutenant Colonel Charles H. Buehring and injuring 17 others. An additional 12 rockets failed to fire and remained in their tubes in the improvised launcher which was located less than 250 meters (820 ft) from the hotel. Deputy Defense Secretary Paul Wolfowitz was staying in the hotel the night of the attack but was unhurt, while author and United States Department of Labor official Craig Davis was injured.

Prior to the 2003 invasion, the hotel housed a shopping centre. The shops offered handmade items, souvenirs, carpets and jewellery shops. The hotel also housed an internet café in 2002. From 2005 through 2006 when a U.S. military Dining Facility (DFAC) was located in its lobby restaurant, the shops did a brisk business with American servicemembers. As of 2008, the shops and the internet café had returned, as well as a café. The hotel was used as a safe and neutral meeting place between the Iraqi Government, visiting dignitaries and Coalition Forces during 2007 – 2008. The hotel hosts meetings for economic development. Its position astride the International Zone ("Green Zone") boundary allows relative ease of attendance by Iraqis residing outside the International Zone.

The hotel was renovated by the United States Army Corps of Engineers with the help of local manpower and renovations were completed in 2008.

It was bombed on 19 August 2009. The hotel underwent a subsequent $65m renovation between 2010 and 2011 in preparation for an intended Arab leader's summit.

It joined the Rixos chain in 2012 and was renamed the Rixos Al Rasheed Baghdad Hotel. It transferred to the Golden Tulip Hotels chain in 2014, and was renamed the Royal Tulip Al Rasheed Hotel.

During the 2026 Iran war, the top two floors of the hotel were hit by a drone, which caused material damage.
