= Nine Parts of Desire (play) =

9 Parts of Desire
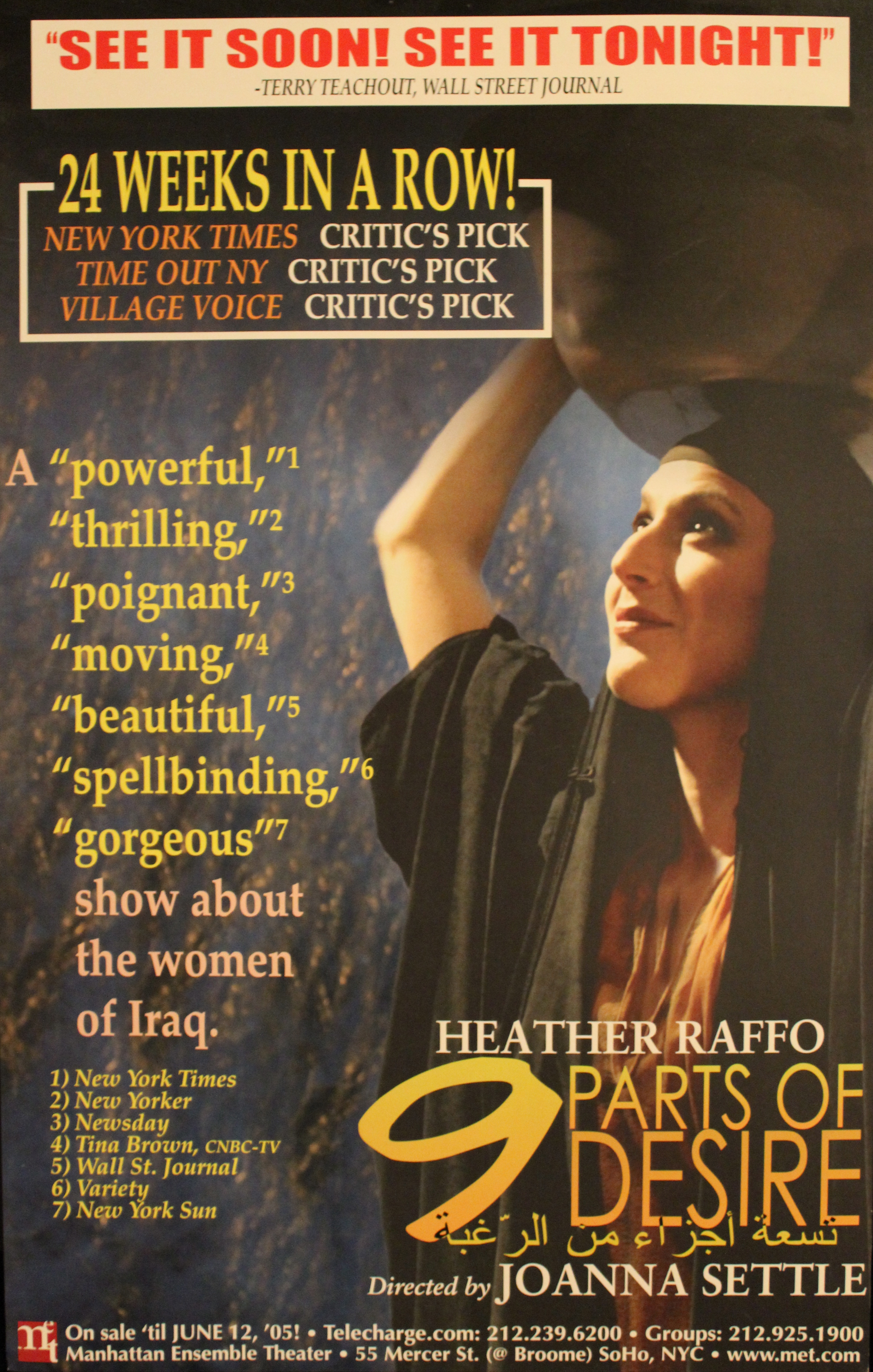
- Poster from the Manhattan Ensemble Theatre production, 2005
- Original language: English
- Written by: Heather Raffo
- Characters: Character list

Premiere
- Date: October 9, 2004
- Place: Manhattan Ensemble Theatre, New York City

9 Parts of Desire (Arabic: تسعة اجزاء من الرغبة) is a play written by Heather Raffo.

In the original version, a single performer plays all nine characters. Heather Raffo herself has acted in productions of 9 Parts of Desire. Some productions opt to use multiple actors. Joanna Settle directed the play's first productions.

Michael Billington of The Guardian wrote that the play's "great virtue" "is that it not only deals with the plight of Iraqi women but forces us to confront the moral issues of war." Melissa Rose Bernardo of Entertainment Weekly wrote that "What Raffo unearths, beneath the aforementioned Saddam-inflicted atrocities, is the universal and very basic human trait of insecurity." Billington added that "The play raises a difficult question, especially for those opposed to the recent war: what should the west have done about Iraq?"

== Title ==
The title originates from a statement from Ali that "God created sexual desire in 10 parts; then he gave nine parts to women and one to men." This statement is from a hadith in the 100 Maxims of Imam Ali. Lauren Sandler of The New York Times wrote that "The play's emphasis on sex is inherent in its title." Geraldine Brooks had used this statement as a title of her 1995 book, Nine Parts of Desire. The only aspect the book by Brooks and the play share are the title. Raffo thanked Brooks for inspiration in the program of the play.

== Creation and conception ==
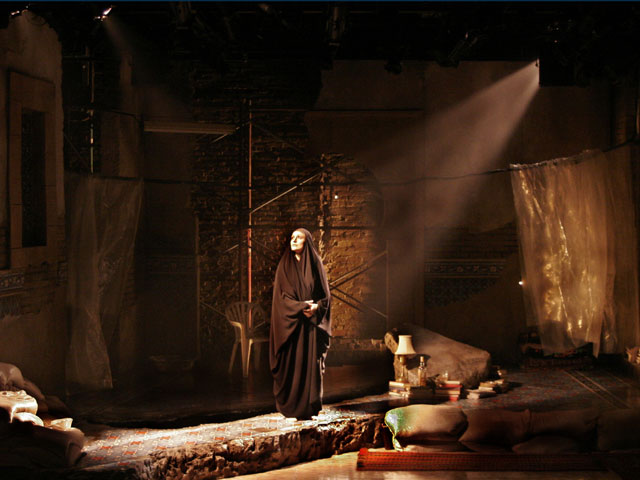
Heather Raffo in Fishelson's production of 9 Parts of Desire at Manhattan Ensemble Theatre, 2005.

During an August 1993 trip to Baghdad to see family, Heather Raffo visited the Saddam Art Center. According to Raffo, a painting titled "Savagery", depicting a naked woman holding onto a tree, gave her the inspiration to make this play. This painting was made by Layla al-Attar. Raffo was curious about the life of Al-Attar, and in the play she placed the al-Attar character prominently.

Raffo had, for ten years, interviewed Iraqi women from various social backgrounds, and she used this information to write the play. Some women were strangers to her and some were relatives. According to Raffo, "[being an Iraqi] got me in the door" but that the women were more willing to confide in her because she was also an American.

In 1998 Raffo declared that she would use this concept as her Master of Fine Arts thesis. As part of the thesis, she did a 20-minute performance at the Old Globe Theatre in San Diego, California. The final play was created in 2003.

== Characters ==
The characters are composites of the Iraqi women Raffo had interviewed. If one actress portrays all the characters, she may wear an abaya differently each time she portrays a distinct character. There were no changes of costume in Raffo's original performance, and instead there was only a difference in how the abaya is worn. In the play Raffo used different accents to portray regional and class differences; at the time she first performed the play she did not know Arabic. The abaya itself is also used as a prop. The women are, in order: Mulaya, Layal, Amal, Huda, the doctor, the girl, Umm Ghada, the American, and Nanna.

- Mulaya - The first character in the play. Mulaya is a woman who responds and lead calls to women at funerals. The play does not state the identity of the person who hired Mulaya. Magda Romanska of Alif: Journal of Comparative Poetics wrote that Mulaya's mourning is directed at all of Iraq rather than a specific person, and that "In a way, she is more symbolic figuration than character". "Mulaya" is the traditional name of a woman hired at funerals.
  - Joel Hirschhorn of Variety describes her as "a poignant, pitiable figure."
- Layal (the name means "all the nights") - She is the play's main speaker. An artist from Baghdad, Layal is the curator of the Saddam Art Center. Layal has a privileged position and she is the only artist in Iraq allowed to make nude paintings. She had been forced into having sexual relations with Saddam's sons. She had watched the execution of one of her friends, who died after being fed to dogs. She survives during the rule of Saddam because she painted portraits of Saddam Hussein. The end of the play reveals that Layal has been killed in a bombing by American missile. She is based on an Iraqi artist, Layla Attar, who died in 1993 after her house was bombed by American missile.
  - When Raffo played Layal, in the words of Maria Beach of the Theatre Journal, she "[moved] with a confident grace that is betrayed by nervous giggles" and "[stroked] her throat sensually". The abaya is draped on the character's shoulders.
  - Romanska wrote that Layal "struggles to maintain a coherent self-image" because she feels trapped by the conflicting perceptions of herself being a victim, collaborator, and critic of Saddam's government, and that Layal operates on a survival mode because she is so deeply traumatized by what she has experienced. Billington wrote that even though Layal is "apparently compromised by her complicity with Saddam's regime" she "defends herself vigorously and, through her painting, brings to life a wide range of oppressed Iraqi women". John Lahr of The New Yorker wrote that "Of the many atrocities that the women report, the most compelling is the spiritual mutation of Layal, whose collaboration with Saddam’s regime leaves her internally empty and morally bankrupt. She is beyond shame or pity." Hirschhorn argues that Layal is the "most fascinating personality" of the play. Romanska also wrote that Layal both subtly criticizes Saddam's government and sympathizes with it at the same time.
- Amal - A Bedouin woman who talks about her romantic issues, Amal, who wears an abaya, is fat, and the production calls for the costume to give the appearance of a fat woman. Beach described Amal as "sweetly sensitive". In her story, she moves to London with her husband and two children. She discovers that her husband is having sexual intercourse with her best friend. Nine Parts of Desire does not state whether she divorced her husband; Amal moves back to Iraq after her discovery, leaving her husband. She later moves to Israel and becomes the second wife of one of her father's friends, an Arab tribesman. Amal takes care of the eight children of the first wife because that wife leaves for periods of several months. Amal leaves the Israeli Arab when he does not take the family to Canada like he promises. In Baghdad, Amal is rejected by a friend of her ex-husband after the two have a year-long correspondence over the telephone. She returns to her first husband who is still in London.
  - Lauren Sandler of The New York Times wrote that Amal "confesses heartbreak and desire in a monologue that sounds more HBO than how some audiences might perceive women in the Middle East." The woman who Amal was based on saw a production of the play in 2003.
- Huda (or Hooda) - Huda, 70 years old, is a resident of London who believes that the United States should have removed Saddam Hussein from power during the 1991 Gulf War. Hooda drinks and smokes. A leftist and an academic, Huda left Iraq in 1963. Before she left Iraq, she was a member of a political party opposed to the Ba'ath Party, and therefore becoming imprisoned for a period. After leaving Iraq, she was involved in many political causes. Romanska wrote that Huda "left Iraq a long time ago, and by now should have adjusted to her new life, but Huda lives in her past, reliving traumatic memories from the old country." She has ambivalent feelings about the 2003 invasion of Iraq. Even though she is opposed to U.S. imperialism, she has a strong hatred of Saddam Hussein.
  - Romanska wrote that "Next to Layal, Huda is perhaps the most complex of the nine characters."
- The Doctor - A woman, educated in the United Kingdom, she had returned to Iraq in order to help her country. She had treated various injuries related to war. The doctor's hospital is in a poor condition and she encounters negative effects of uranium weapons, including newborn babies with mutations. Her name is not stated and she is referred to as "The Doctor".
- The Girl - A 9-year-old girl, this character has no name. Her mother withdrew her from school after some American soldiers had visited the school. She actively follows American popular culture, such as listening to 'N Sync, through the television and satellite, and she believes American soldiers appear like Justin Timberlake. Romanska states that she describes violent events and possibilities "matter-of-factly, so used to the twisted reality around her that she appears unaware of its horror." Romanska states that it is common for survivors of traumatic events to feel a sense of numbness. The girl describes the death of her grandparents; they were unwilling to answer the door and did not speak English, and a tank killed them afterwards. The girl can distinguish types of weapons from hearing them fired. Romanska stated, "She is proud of this skill and brags about it with a blasé attitude, on the same emotional scale with which she chats about Justin Timberlake and Oprah".
  - Beach stated that when Raffo played the girl, she "[danced] with awkward exuberance to music videos on satellite television." The character wears the abaya twisted into a braid.
- Umm Ghada - She describes the United States-perpetrated February 13, 1991 Amiriyah shelter bombing, in which she lost her family. She had since become a caretaker of the site, serving as its guide, while living a yellow trailer outside of the site and calling herself "Umm Ghada" or "mother of Ghada" after her deceased daughter. The name "Ghada" also means "tomorrow" and the character states "so I am Umm Ghada, Mother of Tomorrow. My full name is dead with them." Umm Ghada makes it her singular life mission to tell the world what had happened, and Romanska states that this reaction is typical of trauma survivors; Romanska added that "Her life never returns to normal, as she is unable to function outside of the shelter", and that she had lost her personal identity as a result of the bombing. Umm Ghada is based on a real person.
  - Twair argues she is "[p]erhaps the most tragic" character.
- The American - Un-named, she is an Iraqi American exile in Manhattan, has family in Iraq, and watches the news of the war there. Her monologues are scattered throughout the play. She is anxious for news about her family. She recites the names of Iraqi relatives while holding a rosary and watching CNN coverage of bombing in Baghdad. She engages in trivial pursuits in order to stay sane but cannot enjoy them. Romanska wrote "Watching the bombs come down on her family neighborhood, the American is stunned by her own sense of alienation: She has grown to identify herself as an American, and now, she is asked to view herself as the other, the enemy." Pat McDonnell Twair of The Middle East wrote that the character "may even be Raffo herself". Romanska refers to her as the "alter ego" of Raffo.
- Nanna - An elderly street peddler who had lived through Iraq's political turmoil, she sells objects salvaged from destroyed structures to U.S. Marines. The final item she attempts to sell is Savagery, a painting by Layal. The play indicates in this way that Layal is now dead. Marilyn Stasio of Variety describes her as a "Mother Courage-like figure".

== Production ==
The play opened in August 2003 at the Traverse Theatre in Edinburgh, Scotland. In September of that year, it debuted off West End in the Bush Theatre. From October 2004 to May 2005, it debuted off-Broadway at the Manhattan Ensemble Theatre.

Raffo and Amir ElSaffar, an Iraqi maqam musician, created a concert version. This version played at The Kennedy Center.

== Reception ==
Magda Romanska of Alif: Journal of Comparative Poetics wrote that there was a "general enthusiasm" for the play when it was first released. She stated that at the time of the release, "There was curiosity about Iraq and Iraqis in the US, at the same time as the invasion was presented to American people as if it were meant to 'liberate' Iraq, and particularly oppressed Iraqi women." The writing of the play occurred before the 2003 Invasion of Iraq but the release happened after the invasion.

In 2003 The Independent named this play as one of the five best plays. In regards to the 2003 performance at the Traverse Theatre, Billington wrote that "Although Raffo is a fine actress, her transitions from one character to another are not always sharply defined. But aesthetic niggles pale beside the importance of her subject." Twair wrote that the performance in London in the September 2003 season was ranked among the best five plays in London.

Bernardo gave the performance opening on October 9, 2004 an "A−". In regards to a 2004 performance in New York City, Stasio wrote "While a full-cast production might have given this incendiary material a more devastating impact, it's impossible to hear the voices of these women without wanting to line up to sign their witness book." Stasio was referring to a scene where Umm Ghada asks the audience to sign her witness book.

Damaso Reyes of the New York Amsterdam News wrote regarding the 2004 New York performance that ""Nine Parts" would be an amazing experience if it contained a full cast, but Ms. Raffo's solo performance makes it even more spectacular. She seamlessly shifts from one character to another and then back again to stitch together a narrative which attempts to give the audience a far deeper understanding of the world of Iraq's women than anything we have seen before."

Hirschhorn argued that the differentiation of the characters "isn’t as clear as it could be, and Raffo’s unrelentingly impassioned portrayal can grow exhausting. Some modulation and subtlety would give the audience room to respond more fully."

Geraldine Brooks, the author of the book Nine Parts of Desire, wrote that "It is resonant. It unpeels layer upon layer of the characters' lives, never reaching for the easy or simple assumptions about who or what is to blame for their predicaments."
