= City Opera of Vancouver =

Canadian chamber opera company

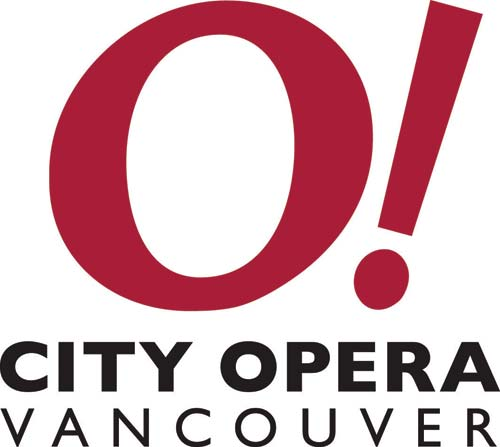

City Opera of Vancouver is a professional chamber opera company in Vancouver, Canada, founded in 2006. Its past productions include the Vancouver premiere of Nigredo Hotel by Ann-Marie MacDonald and Nic Gotham; commission and premiere of Missing, by librettist Marie Clements and composer Brian Current, given in co-production with Pacific Opera Victoria; the premiere of a 'new' Mozart chamber opera, The Lost Operas of Mozart; the world premiere of Pauline, a chamber opera with an original libretto by Margaret Atwood; the commission and workshop premiere of Fallujah, with music by Tobin Stokes and libretto by Heather Raffo, and supported by the Annenberg Foundation of Los Angeles; the Canadian event premiere of Sumidagawa and Curlew River in double bill; and, the British Columbia premiere of Viktor Ullmann's The Emperor of Atlantis.

== Performance venues ==
City Opera of Vancouver led efforts to restore Vancouver's Pantages Theatre as a home for the company as well as the Vancouver Cantonese Opera and Vancouver Moving Theatre. Built by Alexander Pantages in 1907, the building was considered to be the oldest remaining vaudeville theatre in Western Canada and was listed as one of Vancouver's heritage buildings. However, after Vancouver City Council voted to refuse restoration in 2011, the structure was demolished, and the company now uses other proscenium houses in Metro Vancouver as its performing venues.

== Board and advisors ==
City Opera is managed by an incorporated non-profit Board of Directors, headed by President Janet Lea. It is a member of the Community Arts Council of Vancouver, and a Community Partner of the Canadian Music Centre. Its staff includes Conductor and Artistic Director Dr Charles Barber, and General Manager Victoria Wilcott. Roger Parton serves as Staff Coache and accompanist, and David Kerr as Production Manager. The company's musical advisors were the late Sir Charles Mackerras, and remain Sean Bickerton, Robert Baker, and Colin Miles of the Canadian Music Centre. City Opera's honorary patron is Evgeny Kissin.

== Productions ==
=== Der Kaiser von Atlantis ===
On 1 February 2009, City Opera gave the British Columbia premiere of Viktor Ullmann's The Emperor of Atlantis (Der Kaiser von Atlantis). It was attended and addressed by the Lieutenant-Governor of British Columbia, the Honourable Steven Point. Subsequent remarks and analysis were provided by Dr Jaap Hamburger, a child of Auschwitz survivors. This chamber opera, professionally produced, was undertaken in partnership with the Vancouver Holocaust Education Centre. It was written at Theresienstadt in 1944, and has been recorded by Decca.

=== Sumidagawa and Curlew River ===
Opening 26 May 2010, City Opera (together with co-producers UBC Drama and Film, and Blackbird Theatre) gave the Canadian premiere of Sumidagawa together with the opera it inspired, Benjamin Britten's Curlew River. The first, drawn from the 15th-century Japanese noh play, starred Butoh artist Denise Fujiwara as Madwoman in a choreography by Natsu Nakajima. The second starred tenor Isaiah Bell as Madwoman, together with John Minágro, Sam Marcacinni, Joel Klein, and members of the Vancouver Cantata Singers. It was directed by John Wright of Blackbird Theatre, with scenography by Robert Gardiner of UBC Theatre and Film.

=== Fallujah ===
On 21 February 2011, it was announced that City Opera Vancouver had received the largest opera commission grant in Canadian history. The Annenberg Foundation of Los Angeles, in collaboration with its Explore.org affiliate, awarded City Opera $250,000 US to create a chamber opera based on an original story about the war in Iraq. That story was inspired by the life and work of USMC Sergeant Christian Ellis. The new opera, using the working title Fallujah, was created over a period of two years, with its workshops held in Vancouver. The fourth and final workshop set was given before an invited audience at the Frederic Wood Theatre on 13 May 2012. It is scored for nine singers and eleven players. The librettist is Iraqi-American Heather Raffo, of New York City, and the composer Canadian Tobin Stokes of Vancouver. On 2 July 2012, the work was officially launched via a long-form feature published by The Associated Press. At the same time, the Annenberg Foundation's explore.org affiliate began the online release of a series of filmed excerpts from the opera. On 9 July, it was announced that the foundation had granted City Opera Vancouver an additional $100,000 toward the making of these film materials. In March 2016, "Fallujah" received its US premiere, produced in Los Angeles by Long Beach Opera and, in November 2016, its New York premiere at New York City Opera. A KCET television documentary about the work received a Los Angeles Emmy in July 2017.

=== Pauline ===
On 23 May 2014, the company presented the world premiere of Pauline, a chamber opera composed by Tobin Stokes to a libretto by Margaret Atwood. Starring dramatic mezzo-soprano Rose-Ellen Nichols, soprano Sarah Vardy, and tenor Adam Fisher, it sold out all five nights. Commissioned by City Opera of Vancouver, the opera is set in Vancouver in March 1913 during the final days in the life of the Canadian writer and performer Pauline Johnson. At the invitation of the literary festival Québec en toutes lettres, the work was performed in concert version at Le Grand Theatre du Québec on 16 October 2015 featuring the original cast.

=== The Lost Operas of Mozart ===
The company produced its first comedy, its first Mozart, its first production at Christ Church Cathedral, the first appearance of Bramwell Tovey in an opera, and the premiere of a 'new' Mozart opera, on 27, 28 and 29 October 2016. Based on the scholarship of Raphaël De Vos, John Drummond, Jane Oakshott, and Richard Rastall, these were re-constructions of three operas Mozart started, but never finished. Two were Italian comedies (Lo sposo deluso, and L'oca del Cairo), and the third a German Singspiel (Zaide). They were conjoined in an original play by Maria Reva, and all founded on a concept by stage director Alan Corbishley: an impresario is sitting in a theatre, considering his next project when – to his amazement – the Gates of Limbo open. Out pour lost souls, spirits who have been waiting 200 years for Mozart to give them life. They beg for a chance to sing, but the impresario is unimpressed.

=== Missing ===
Missing, City Opera Vancouver's third commission, premiered on 3 November at the York Theatre in Vancouver. After a five-performance run, the opera moved to Victoria, the home of Pacific Opera who co-commissioned the work, and ran until 26 November. A chamber opera composed by Brian Current to a libretto by Marie Clements, Missing explores how the murders and unexplained disappearances of at least 18 women along the Highway of Tears and over a thousand Canada-wide, most of them Indigenous, affected the people in their lives.

=== Nigredo Hotel ===
The Vancouver premiere of this "bizarre operatic thriller" was given by City Opera Vancouver in September 2018, at The Cultch Historic Theatre. Nigredo Hotel was written by Canadians Nic Gotham and Ann-Marie MacDonald, and originally premiered in 1992. Directed by Alan Corbishley, and starring baritone Tyler Duncan and soprano Sarah Vardy, this production featured a giant head conceived and lit by John Webber. Barbara Clayden designed the costumes, and Malcolm Dow the sound. The four-player combo performed onstage throughout.

== Canadian Classics ==
City Opera created the recording series, Canadian Classics, a survey of Canadian art music from c. 1800 to the present. It is designed in four genres: symphonic, chamber, instrumental, and vocal/choral/operatic repertoire. A national panel of a dozen advisors has recommended worthy Canadian repertoire. Naxos Records is the lead partner in the long-term endeavour. Violinist Mark Fewer, pianist Rena Sharon, the Vancouver International Song Institute, clarinetist François Houle, and other artists have agreed to join the Canadian Classics roster. The series manager is Raymond Bisha. Canadian Classics was officially launched at the opening season gala concert of the Vancouver Symphony Orchestra at that city's Orpheum Theatre on 24 September 2011. The first CD released in the new series, Fugitive Colours, featured the music of Jeffrey Ryan, with the VSO led by conductor Bramwell Tovey. The series plans the release of 6 to 8 new CDs every year.

== Concerts and special events ==
City Opera has offered special events, concerts, and recitals at neighbourhood and service institutions. As of April 2019, there have been 131 such events. In October 2007 the company produced Canada's first Sing-Along Carmina Burana. In May 2009, City Opera produced the first in a series of New Canadian Chamber Opera workshops. This event, with twelve guest artists and recorded on DVD, workshopped the new chamber opera Sea Change, with music by Constantine Caravassilis of Toronto, and libretto by Nora Kelly. In November 2010 the company began a new opera recital series at Minoru Chapel in Richmond, British Columbia.
