= Suad al-Attar =

Iraqi painter (born 1942)

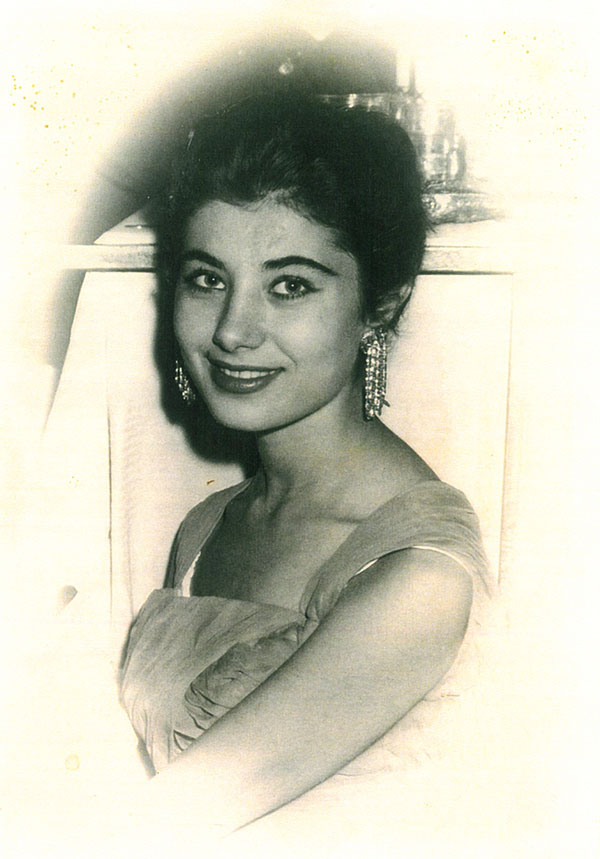
- Suad al-Attar in 1960
- Born: 1942 (age 83–84); Kadhimiyah, Baghdad, Iraq
- Education: Baghdad University; California State University
- Known for: Painter

Suad al-Attar (Arabic, سعاد العطار; born 1942) is an Iraqi painter whose work is in private and public collections worldwide, including The British Museum and the Gulbenkian Collection. She has held over twenty solo exhibitions, including one in Baghdad that became the first solo exhibition in the country's history for a woman artist. Her many awards include the first prize at the International Biennale in Cairo in 1984 and an award of distinction at the Biennale held in Malta in 1995.

== Life and career ==
Suad al-Attar painted from a very young age. She was "discovered" by the influential Iraqi artist, Jawad Saleem after exhibiting in a high school event. He encouraged her to exhibit in events staged by The Baghdad Modern Art Group, and she became one of the few women who participated in functions organized by such art groups.

Suad attained degrees from both Baghdad University and California State University. She also undertook graduate work at the Wimbledon School of Art and the Central School of Art and Design in London, where she studied printmaking. She was the first female artist to have a solo exhibition in Baghdad.

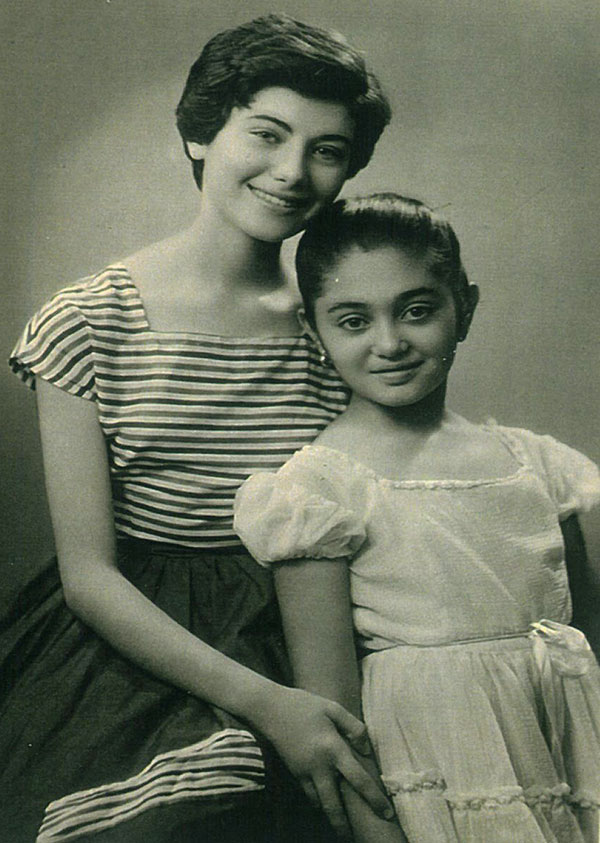
Suad (left) with her sister, Layla, c.1956

Suad left Baghdad with her husband and children in 1976, and settled in London. For her, the perpetual sense of longing for "home" has always been balanced by an awareness of the freedom that comes with distance. This freedom—a condition that gained added significance following the regime’s rise to power under Saddam Hussein in the late 1970s—has enabled her to explore her relationship with her homeland and to develop a personal visual language with which to express it.

Elements of this language are to be found within the traditions of Middle Eastern art. The winged creatures of Assyrian reliefs, Sumerian sculptures, and the illuminated manuscripts of the Baghdadi School were instrumental. However, this awareness of her Arab heritage did not result in slavish imitation, but was forged with her own romantic imagination and an appreciation of western figurative traditions to create enigmatic images in which narrative and symbolism are intertwined.

A substantial monograph documenting her career was published in London in 2004. Much of Suad’s painting is characterized by an intense dreamlike and poetic sensibility that draws on motifs and symbols from within the traditions of Middle Eastern art. In recent years, these richly colored representations of paradise and of sleeping cities bathed in turquoise blue have disappeared from her work as she has become increasingly preoccupied with the plight of Iraq.

Her sister, Layla al-Attar (1944-1993), also an artist, together with her husband and their housekeeper, were killed by a U.S. missile attack on the Iraqi Intelligence main building which was just behind her house, ordered by U.S. President Bill Clinton on 27 June 1993.

== Work ==
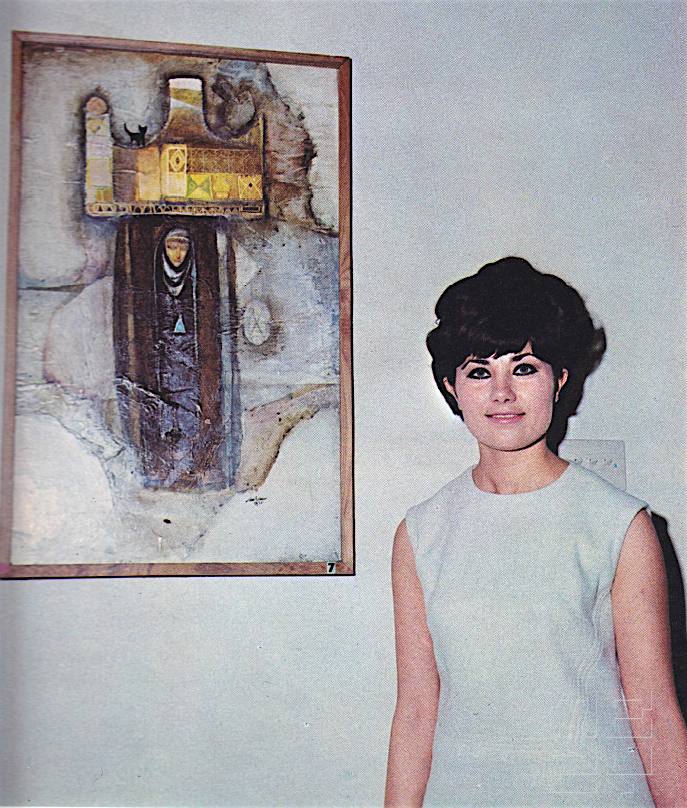
Suad al-Attar with her painting Housewife, Baghdad, 1965

Her work has been described as introducing "an introspective dimension to visual folkloric investigations" ... Paintings represent a synthesis of Mesopotamian and Islamic aesthetics, expressed in a distinct and personal style.

When she relocated to London, much of her work was left behind in her Baghdad house and was lost to looting and vandalism following the 2003 invasion.

== See also ==
- Art of Mesopotamia
- Iraqi art
- Islamic art
- List of Iraqi artists
