= Carey Newman =

Canadian Kwakwakaʼwakw/Salish artist

- Hayalthkin’geme
- Born: February 15, 1975 (age 51)
- Citizenship: Kwakiutl First Nation and Canadian
- Website: careynewman.ca

Carey Newman (Hayalthkin’geme) (born 1975) is a Kwakwakaʼwakw/Salish Canadian multidisciplinary artist, wood carver, filmmaker and author.

== Early life ==
Newman was born to a mother of English, Irish and Scottish settler heritage. His father is of northern Vancouver Island Kwakwaka'wakw people and was of the Kukwakam, Gixsam, and Wawałaba’yi clans, as well as Coast Salish from Xwchíyò:m (Cheam) of the traditional territories of the Stó:lō S'olh Temexw people of British Columbia.

== Career ==
Newman holds the position of the Impact Chair of Indigenous Art Practices at the University of Victoria. He is a member of the board of directors at the Pacific Opera.

His work, Witness Blanket, made in collaboration with the sound engineer Kirk McNally, is constructed of various objects collected from 77 Indigenous communities that represent Indigenous resilience. The objects assembled in the installation were collected from survivors of the Canadian Indian residential schools, various cultural sites, churches and governments. Newman intends the work to symbolize truth and reconciliation as well as comfort and care. It has been shown in numerous venues.

== Collections ==
Witness Blanket is held in the permanent collection of the Canadian Museum for Human Rights.

== Publications ==
Newman's book, Picking Up the Pieces:Residential School Memories and the Making of the Witness Blanket, was co-authored with Kirstie Hudson.

== Awards ==
In 2017, Newman received the Government of Canada Meritorious Service Medal. In 2018, Newman was awarded with the Order of British Columbia. In 2020, Newman received the Extending Reconciliation Award by Leadership Victoria. In 2022, he received the National Opera Directors Award. In 2023, he received an honorary degree of Doctor of Laws Honoris Causa from Royal Roads University.
