= Pauline (Stokes opera) =

- Chamber opera by Tobin Stokes
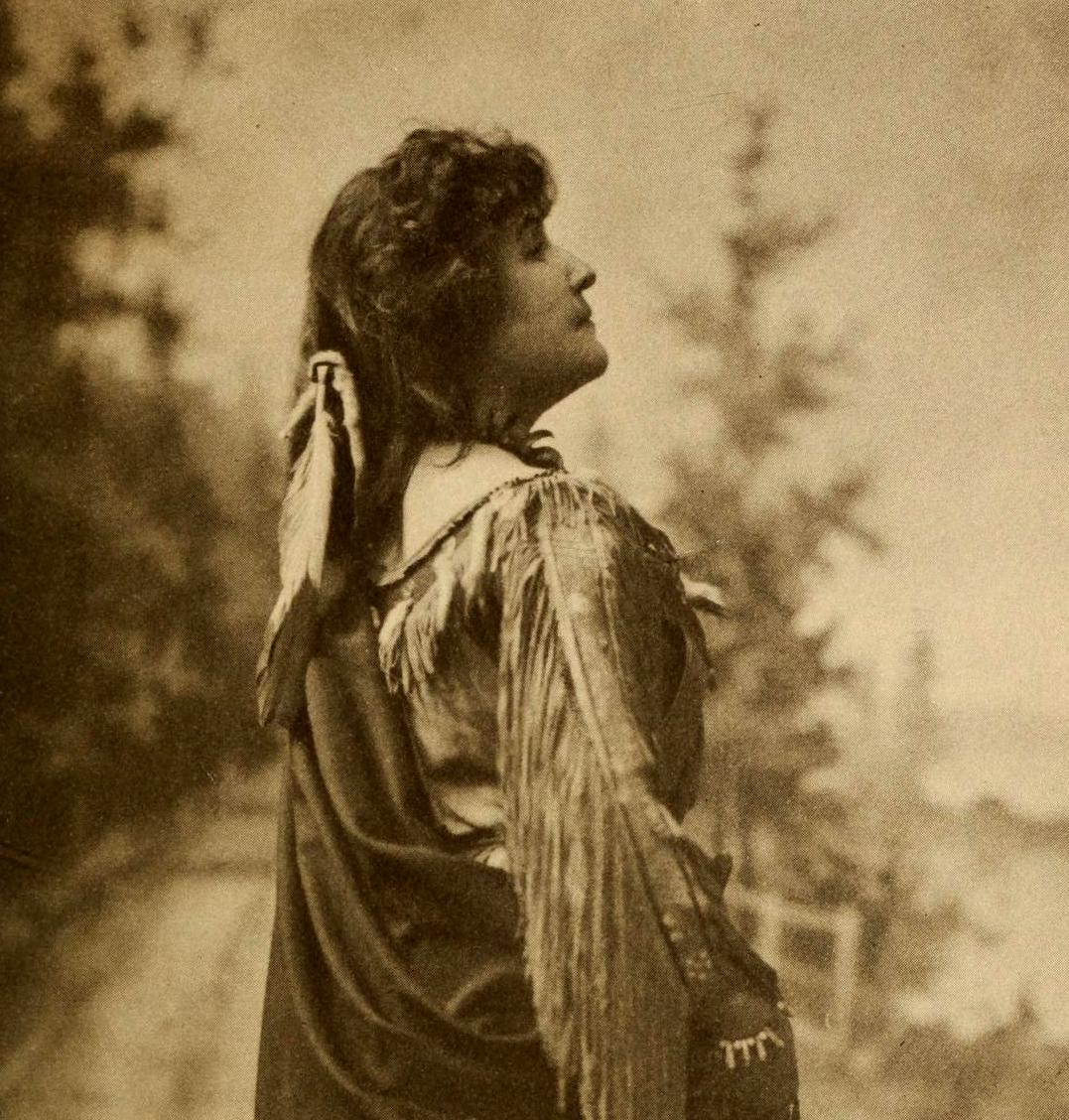
- Pauline Johnson, on whose life the opera is based
- Librettist: Margaret Atwood
- Premiere: 23 May 2014; York Theatre, Vancouver

Pauline is a chamber opera in two acts composed by Tobin Stokes to a libretto by Margaret Atwood. Commissioned by City Opera Vancouver, the opera is set in Vancouver in March 1913 during the final days in the life of the Canadian writer and performer Pauline Johnson. It premiered on 23 May 2014 at Vancouver's York Theatre.

== Creation and performance history ==
Poul Ruders's 2000 opera The Handmaid's Tale had a libretto by Paul Bentley based on Margaret Atwood's novel The Handmaid's Tale. However, Pauline marked the Canadian poet, novelist, and literary critic's debut as an opera librettist in her own right. The history of the Pauline libretto began in 1999 when Atwood wrote it as a commission from the Canadian Opera Company for a new opera to be composed by Randolph Peters, but when the composer pulled out, the project was shelved. In 2006 Charles Barber, the Artistic Director of the newly founded chamber opera company City Opera of Vancouver, approached her to write a libretto for a new opera with a signature role for the distinguished British Columbian mezzo-soprano Judith Forst. Atwood suggested using the libretto she had written for the Canadian Opera Company but pared down to make the work suitable for performance as a chamber opera. Christos Hatzis was to be the composer and the opera was due to premiere in 2010 at Vancouver's historic Pantages Theatre.

As Atwood continued the process of revising the libretto, City Opera of Vancouver was unable to reach an agreement with Hatzis and the premiere was postponed. A new composer, Tobin Stokes, was chosen in 2012. By that time, the Pantages Theatre had been demolished, and Forst's commitments meant that she could no longer take on the title role. Following auditions in March 2013, Rose-Ellen Nichols was chosen to create the role of Pauline. The opera with the preliminary piano/vocal score was workshopped before invited audiences in September, October and November 2013. Both Atwood and Stokes continued revising the work through December of that year with the final orchestration completed by April 2014, shortly before rehearsals began. The opera premiered on 23 May 2014 at the York Theatre in Vancouver, conducted by Charles Barber, directed by Norman Armour, and produced by Nora Kelly and Janet Lea. On the opening night the performance began nearly two hours late following a power outage in Vancouver's East Side. The audience, which included Margaret Atwood, Mayor of Vancouver Gregor Robertson, Squamish Elder Sam George, and Mohawk poet Janet Marie Rogers, waited outside the 371-seat theatre while emergency generators were brought in. Pauline ran for four more sold-out performances, closing on 31 May 2014. At the invitation of the literary festival Québec en toutes lettres, the work was performed in concert version at Le Grand Theatre du Québec on 16 October 2015. It featured the original cast, and a Québec orchestra.

== Roles ==
| Role | Voice type | Premiere cast, 23 May 2014 (Conductor: Charles Barber) |
|---|---|---|
| Pauline Johnson | mezzo-soprano | Rose-Ellen Nichols |
| Eva Johnson (Pauline's sister) | soprano | Sarah Vardy |
| Charles Drayton (Pauline's fiance) / Pauline's manager / Pauline's doctor | tenor | Adam Fisher |
| Grandfather Smoke (Pauline's grandfather) | bass | John Minágro |
| Pauline's nurse /Society woman 3 | mezzo-soprano | Cathleen Gingrich |
| Owen Smiley (Pauline's stage partner) / Rev. Chisholme | baritone | Ed Moran |
| Lady 1 / Society woman 2 | soprano | Diane Speirs |
| Lady 2 / Society woman 2 | soprano | Eleonora Higginson |

== Score ==
The opera requires eight singers taking a total of 14 roles, supported by seven players in the pit. It is scored for cello, viola, violin, keyboard, bassoon, clarinet and bass clarinet (doubled), and flute and alto flute (doubled).
