= Craig Davis (author) =

Anti-corruption and Muslim specialist

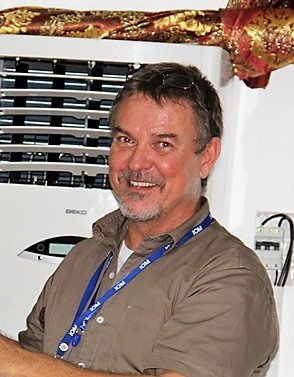
- Born: Craig Steven Davis
- Education: Indiana University Bloomington
- Occupations: Author, Development Specialist
- Spouse: Mirna Davis
- Children: 4

Craig Steven Davis is an international development and anti-corruption worker, specializing in the Muslim world, and author of multiple publications, including The Middle East for Dummies. He has worked in the developing world, primarily the Middle East and South Asia, as a government employee and USAID contractor. In 2009, he was the subject of accusations in Pakistan and left the country out of concerns for his own safety.

== Life and career ==
=== Education ===
Davis studied at Indiana University Bloomington, where he earned two PhDs, in Near Eastern language and culture and religious theory. He conducted fieldwork on Afghan education in Afghanistan and Pakistan in 1999-2000, as a Boren graduate fellow.

=== Career in government ===
In 2002, Davis joined the United States Department of Labor, as an International Education Program Specialist for the Bureau of International Labor Affairs. In July 2003 The Middle East for Dummies, a 316-page paperback in the for Dummies line, was published.

For 10 months in 2003 and 2004, while employed by the US Department of Labor, working through the Coalition Provisional Authority (CPA), he served as a labor advisor to the Iraqi Ministry of Labor and Social Affairs. In this role, he helped establish 26 vocational training centers around the country, rewrite labor laws, and rework government salaries. He was injured in the October 26, 2003 attack on the Al-Rashid Hotel in Baghdad.

=== Work in international development ===
In April 2005 Davis joined the USAID-funded Iraq Civil Society Program as Anti-Corruption Director. Despite significant challenges, including partner staff assassinations, he supported NGO programs that trained over 8,000 Iraqi officials on corruption and its mitigation and created a network of civil society organizations. After leaving Iraq, he served as the Director of Civil Society Programs at the International Research and Exchanges Board (IREX)

==== Allegations ====
While working in Pakistan in 2009 for Creative Associates Inc., a USAID implementing partner, allegations were raised that Davis was a Blackwater representative. The charge was initiated by Nation columnist Shireen Mazari and Ahmed Qureshi, a journalist and conspiracy theorist. As evidence, the similarity in acronyms between Creative Associates International, Inc. (CAII) and the Central Intelligence Agency (CIA) was cited. According to some reports, Davis was the victim of a campaign by the Pakistani government to blacklist certain journalists and NGO workers. Mazari raised the accusations when she worked for The News International. The US Embassy objected to the charges and the editorial leadership determined that the story was inaccurate. Mazari consequently left The News International to work for the Nation and decried US Ambassador Anne Patterson for interfering in Pakistani media. Wall Street Journal reporter Matthew Rosenberg also left the country after similar allegations connecting him to Blackwater put his safety at risk.

=== Views ===
Davis believes that one way to reverse the growing anti-American sentiment among local Muslims in Afghanistan and Pakistan is by respecting and working within the traditional madrasa system. He has written that reform to the education system in Afghanistan and Pakistan is critical to its stability.

== Interests ==
Davis's passion is studying medieval Islamic culture in South Asia.
