= Missing (opera) =

2017 chamber opera

Missing is a 2017 chamber opera with a libretto by Marie Clements and music by Brian Current. Co-commissioned by Pacific Opera Victoria and City Opera Vancouver, its topic is missing and murdered Indigenous women.

== Development ==
The libretto for the work was developed by Marie Clements prior to the selection of the composer. Four different composers were asked to set a portion of this libretto, and their settings were anonymized and sung before a jury to select the work's ultimate composer (Brian Current).

The compositional style is spare, reminiscent of a "chamber music suite". It "eschews familiar operatic conventions such as showy arias, huge choruses and a linear plot". The opera is in English and Gitxsan, an indigenous language spoken in the traditional territory along much of the Highway of Tears.

== Performance history ==
The opera's unofficial premiere in November 2017 was before the "community of the missing" in the Downtown Eastside of Vancouver, one of the opera's two settings. This was followed by a five-night run in each of Vancouver and Victoria later in the month. The show was directed by renowned Canadian director Peter Hinton-Davis.

In 2019 Pacific Opera Victoria remounted Missing, in partnership with the Victoria Native Friendship Centre, Prince George Native Friendship Centre, Regina Treaty/Status Indian Services, Regina Symphony Orchestra, and Prince George Symphony Orchestra. The performances took place in Victoria, Regina, and Prince George.

The United States première of Missing was presented by Anchorage Opera in March 2023.

== Synopsis ==
The opera presents a dual narrative. The primary narrative focuses on Ava, a young white woman who is thrown into a tree during a car crash and sees the body of an indigenous woman known as "Native Girl". This experience makes such an impression on Ava that she adopts many elements of Gitxsan culture, and later sees the murder of Native Girl in her dreams. The secondary narrative focuses on the grief of Native Girl's brother and mother.

== Reception ==
A review in Vancouver Magazine states that Missing "lays the foundation for a bridge between two cultural solitudes that must work together... to give birth to a new Canada". According to Opera Canada, "As an opera, Missing is under-written. As an important piece of theatre that builds over its short 80 minutes to a shatteringly emotional conclusion... [it] is something every Canadian should see".
