= Brian Current =

Canadian composer

- Born: May 4, 1972 (age 54); London, Ontario, Canada
- Genres: Contemporary classical music
- Occupations: Composer, conductor
- Website: http://www.briancurrent.com

Brian Current (born May 4, 1972) is a Canadian composer and conductor.

Born in London, Ontario, Current grew up in Ottawa where he studied piano, guitar and euphonium, and was a chorister. Following studies at McGill University under composers John Rea and Bengt Hambraeus, he earned a doctorate in composition at the University of California, Berkeley where he also studied conducting with David Milnes and Michael Morgan.

In 2006, Current was appointed director of the New Music Ensemble of the Glenn Gould School at the Royal Conservatory of Music. He became director of the Continuum Contemporary Music Ensemble in 2011, and was chosen artistic director of New Music Concerts in Toronto in 2021.

He is an advocate of contemporary classical music, including for young audiences.

Current composes mainly in larger instrumental forms and opera. A key compositional method, which Current has termed "slanted time," involves fluctuations in tempo and shifts in timbre and texture to make the music in a perpetual state of evolution.

His work has been widely recognized with commissions and awards including:

- Dora Award, 2022, for the opera, Gould's Wall
- Jules Léger Prize for New Chamber Music, 2018, for Shout, Sisyphus, Flock
- Commission for the chamber opera, Missing, 2017
- Juno Award for Classical Composition of the Year, 2015, for the Naxos recording of the chamber opera, Airline Icarus.
- First prize, Azrieli Commissioning Competition, 2015, for The Seven Heavenly Halls
- Victor Martyn Lynch-Staunton Award, 2012
- Premio Fedora, 2011, for the chamber opera, Airline Icarus
- Barlow Prize, 2003, for Symphonies in Slanted Time
- Outstanding work by a composer under 30, International Rostrum of Composers, 2001, for This Isn't Silence
- Grand Prize, 2001, CBC National Radio Competition for Young Composers, for For the Time Being
- SOCAN awards, 1997, 1998, 2000

Current has had residencies in the US, Italy and Japan and was the recipient of a Guggenheim Fellowship.
