= The Tempest (Hoiby) =

The Tempest is an opera in three acts by the American composer Lee Hoiby to a libretto by Mark Shulgasser adapted from Shakespeare's The Tempest. It was first performed in 1986 by the Des Moines Metro Opera.

== Recording ==
- The Tempest – Robert Balonek (baritone), Molly Davey (soprano), Catherine Webber (soprano), Joshua Benevento (tenor), Anthony Caputo (tenor), Julian Whitley (tenor), Rasdia Wilmot (alto), Jeffrey Taveras (vocals), JungBum Heo (vocals), Derek Greten-Harrison (counter-tenor), Said Pressley (vocals), D'ana Lombard (vocals), Diana Wangerin (vocals), Ilene Pabon (vocals), Purchase Symphony Orchestra, Hugh Murphy. Purchase Opera, Director Jacque Trussel. Albany Records 2009
