= Tobin Stokes =

Canadian composer

- Born: Tobin David Stokes; November 11, 1966 (age 58); North Vancouver, British Columbia, Canada
- Occupation: Composer
- Website: www.tobinstokes.com

Tobin David Stokes (born 1966) is a Canadian composer and theatre creator, notable for his work in opera, theatre, choral music and television. His works have been performed by New York City Opera, Long Beach Opera, City Opera of Vancouver, the Moscow Symphony Orchestra, and the Victoria Symphony. He also composes for television, including scores for documentaries by the BBC, ABC, and PBS.

== Life and career ==
Stokes was born in North Vancouver, British Columbia, Canada. He studied the piano from the age of three and became a charter member of the Powell River Boy's Choir at age seven, performing, competing and touring internationally with them until he was fourteen. He holds a BMus in percussion from the University of Victoria and an MFA in creative writing from the University of British Columbia. Stokes was resident composer at the biannual International Choral Kathaumixw Festival in Powell River, British Columbia, B.C. from 1994 to 2014. He was resident composer with the Victoria Symphony from 2005 to 2008, at the Legislative Assembly of British Columbia, and with the Urban Youth Choir Festival in Örebro, Sweden from 2011 to 2012.

Stokes has composed several operas: Fallujah, with libretto by Heather Raffo, Pauline, with libretto by Margaret Atwood, The Vinedressers, and Rattenbury.
