= Heather Raffo =

American dramatist

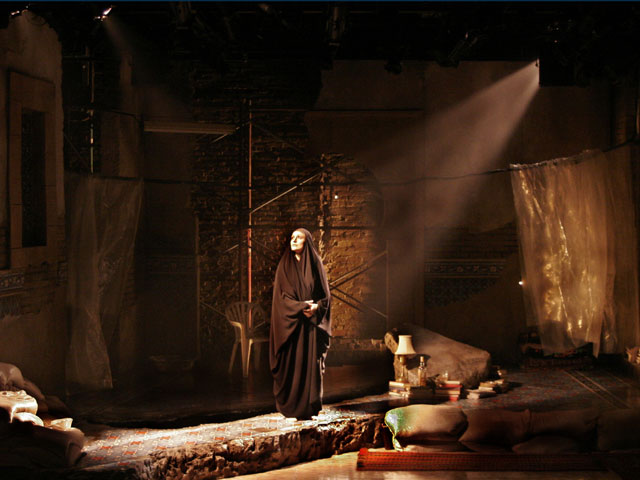
- Heather Raffo in Fishelson's production of 9 Parts of Desire at Manhattan Ensemble Theatre, 2005.
- Born: Heather Raffo; Michigan, United States
- Education: University of Michigan
- Awards: 2005 Lucille Lortel Award for Outstanding Solo Show in 9 Parts of Desire

Heather Raffo (born in Michigan, United States) is a Lucille Lortel Award-winning Iraqi-American playwright and actress, best known for her leading role in the one-woman play 9 Parts of Desire.

== Biography ==
=== Early life ===
Her father is Iraqi, born in Mosul but lived in Baghdad. He was a civil engineer and her mother is American. Heather is Chaldean on her father's side and Roman Catholic on her mother's side. She grew up in Okemos, Michigan. but lived in New York City for thirty years. Heather holds a BA from the University of Michigan where she studied Literature and Theater, and graduated Magna Cum Laude in Literature. A MFA from the University of San Diego and also studied at the Royal Academy of Dramatic Art in London. Having been born in the United States, she and her family initially visited Iraq in 1974 when she was four years old, 1993 as a little girl, and again in 2013. She also visited Iraqi family in Damascus and Dubai in 2006. She had flown in and her family drove since it was not safe to travel into Iraq at the time.

Raffo credits Ntozake Shange as her most significant artistic influence and has noted her as an inspiration to writing her own work after reading For Colored Girls Who Have Considered Suicide When the Rainbow Is Enuf.

=== Career ===
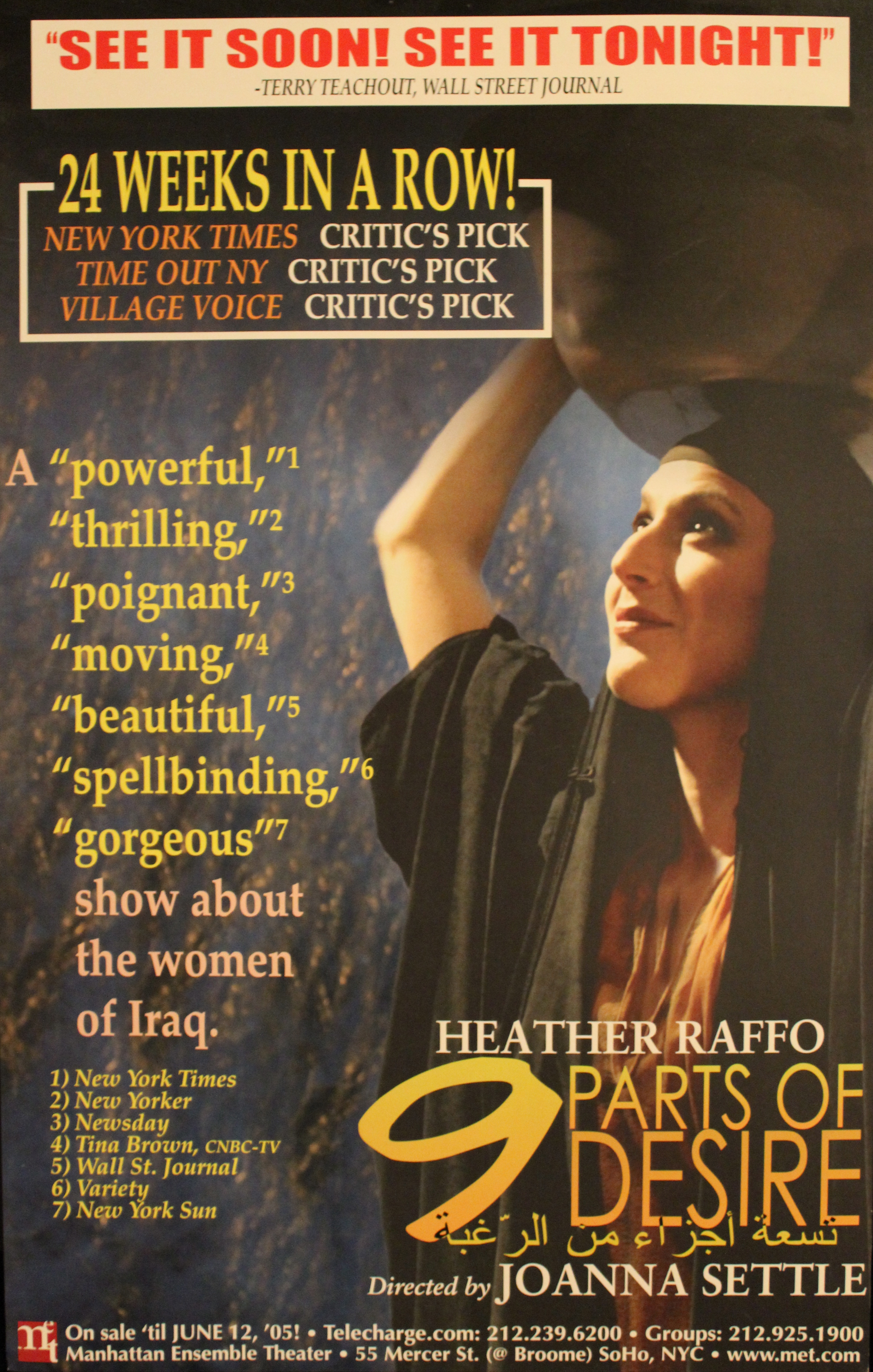
9 Parts of Desire: poster from the Manhattan Ensemble Theatre production, 2005

Heather Raffo is most famous for her notable role in the one-woman play 9 Parts of Desire. The play focuses on the lives of women in her father's homeland, and was originally conceived in 1993 after a visit to her Iraqi relatives. It was also inspired by Raffo's trip to the Saddam Art Centre in Baghdad where she saw only billboard sized portraits of Saddam Hussein. Later, in a back room, she saw a painting of a nude woman clinging to a barren tree. She took a photo of the painting, returned to America and devised a way of replicating the painting into a play. A decade later she completed the play, which features monologues by nine highly distinct Iraqi women, all played by herself.

When asked about 9 Parts of Desire, she comments

"I'd love to hear an American say, 'That Bedouin woman is just like my aunt.' But at the same time, I want American audiences to walk out a little confused, not able to say, 'Oh, I get it,' but rather to understand how difficult it is to grasp the psyche of people who have lived under Saddam for 30 years with American support, then had a war with Iran, resulting in 1.5 million deaths, followed by 13 years of sanctions and two wars under American firepower."

The response to the play drew much media attention to Heather, as she has given numerous public appearances and interviews on American television shows. She has also spoken to the National Press Club, as well as featuring in O: The Oprah Magazine as part of her "Aha Moment". With such major success in London, Los Angeles, New York, Seattle, Chicago, Philadelphia and Washington DC, 9 Parts of Desire is currently being translated for international productions in France, Brazil and Turkey. On July 18, 2008, she recreated some of her monologues from "9 Parts of Desire" at the New York Open Center

and shared what she has learned from what John Lahr in The New Yorker called "an example of how art can remake the world." In May 2013, 9 Parts of Desire was performed for the first time in Iraq by students from The American University of Iraq – Sulaimani, with Heather in the audience.

Heather has also been approached by International press about doing stories on her show, but she refused as she did not want to draw attention to her family in Iraq, as it could lead to dangerous circumstances.

Heather is also one of the six participating writers for the play The Middle East, In Pieces, a play which displays the current developments in the Middle East and addresses the conflicts in Lebanon, Israel and Iraq.

Her other acting credits include, playing Sarah Woodruff in the world premiere of The French Lieutenant's Woman performed at the Fulton Opera House. The off-Broadway, Over the River and Through the Woods, the off Broadway/National Tour of Macbeth where she played Lady Macbeth, The Merry Wives of Windsor as Mistress Page and The Rivals all with The Acting Company. Regionally in theatre productions of the following, Othello, Romeo and Juliet, As You Like It, Macbeth, and The Comedy of Errors all with The Old Globe Theatre in San Diego.

She has performed her plays at Off Broadway in New York, Off West-End in London, at the Kennedy Center, at the U.S.-Islamic World Forum and at dozens of large performance venues nationally as well as hundreds of universities across the country. They have been performed in nearly every regional theater market in the United States. (Just some of the most famous are: Playwrights Horizons in New York, Arena Stage, Shakespeare Theater, Kennedy Center, The Guthrie, Seattle Re, Berkley Rep, The Old Globe). 9 Parts of Desire was the 5th most produced play across the country according to American Theater Magazine in one season.

9 Parts of Desire has had international productions in Brazil, Greece, Hungary, Turkey, Iraq, Sweden, Malta, India, UK, Scotland, Canada.

Noura has been performed in Cairo, Abu Dhabi and in major theaters cross the U.S., Playwrights Horizons Off Broadway, Shakespeare Theater in D.C., The Guthrie Theater in Minneapolis, The Old Globe in San Diego, Marin Theater in California and Detroit Public Theater.

She has performed in the play In Darfur by Winter Miller at New Yorks Public Theatre, revealing the depth of the crisis in Darfur, Sudan. The play was made to raise awareness of the ongoing genocide in Darfur and help encourage activism.

She wrote the libretto for Tobin Stokes' opera Fallujah, based on the Second Battle of Fallujah.

Her play Noura opened at Playwrights Horizons on December 10, 2018.

She also wrote Tomorrow Will Be Sunday: A New Theatrical Platform.

Raffo also took part in the Seen Jeem podcast. She was interviewed by Pauline Homsi Vinson and explained her plays.

== Filmography ==
- Vino Veritas
- 9 Parts of Desire
- In Darfur
- The Middle East, In Pieces
- The Surrogate

== Awards ==
- Susan Smith Blackburn Prize Special Commendation
- Marian Seldes-Garson Kanin Fellowship for 9 Parts of Desire.
- Lucille Lortel Award (2005) for Outstanding Solo Show
- Helen Hayes Award
- Weissberger Award

=== Nominations ===
- Outer Critics Circle Nomination
- Drama League nomination for Outstanding Performance
