= Beil =

Beil may refer to:

- Beil (surname)
- Großer Beil, mountain in Austria
- A former spelling of Biel, East Lothian
