= Dan Muller =

American painter

- Born: Daniel Cody Muller; October 11, 1889; Near Choteau, Montana
- Died: December 4, 1976 (aged 87); Port Washington, Wisconsin
- Occupations: Artist, writer, cowboy

Daniel Cody Muller, generally known as Dan Muller (1889–1976) was a cowboy, an artist, illustrator, and writer of the American West. Having grown up on a ranch, he learned to break in horses, a skill he utilized for the United States Army during World War I. He made and sold paintings of the American Old West and worked occasionally as a ranch hand into the 1920s. In 1933, his first published story was Break 'Em Gentle for Esquire magazine. He wrote and illustrated books, like Chico of the Cross Up Ranch and Horses. He created three large murals for the Chicago World's Fair (Century of Progress) which were awarded a gold medal and a $1,200 cash prize.

Muller was a prolific artist who painted scenes with great detail due to his photographic memory. He married Edna Groeschel while both of them were on horseback in Nevada. The couple moved in 1939 to Port Washington, Wisconsin, where Muller continued to work as a creator and lived the rest of his life.

Muller wrote the book My Life with Buffalo Bill, which sounds autobiographical, but there has been no verification that Muller had the kind of relationship with Cody that he asserts. (Note: According to Muller, Carl previously worked as a scout with William F. Cody, known as Buffalo Bill. Also, according to Muller, he got into serious legal trouble when he was a teenager and helped two men steal 40 horses in Buffalo, Wyoming. They were caught by the sheriff and the two men went to the penitentiary and Muller, at 15 years of age, was held in jail. To pass the time, Muller drew pictures on the walls with charcoal, which remained on the walls. Cody stepped in to provide discipline for the teenager. Muller states that Cody legally adopted Muller and took him on the road with his Buffalo Bill's Wild West shows across the United States, Canada, Mexico, and Europe. At some point, Muller worked in the shows, too. Cody taught Muller to ride broncs and rope steers. When not on tour Muller stayed with Cody on his ranch. Muller lived with Cody for 18 years. Muller states that he tried to model himself after Buffalo Bill and treasures the letters that he has received from him. Samuels restates Muller's claim with greater detail. He states that between 1911 and 1913, Muller was with the Buffalo Bill shows and worked on a film with Cody. Muller's claims of a close relationship, though, have never been verified.)

== Early life ==
Muller was born on October 11, 1889 near Choteau, Montana. He grew up on Cross-Up Ranch near the headwaters of the Teton River. Muller claimed that his father was one quarter Piegan Blackfeet. On December 25, 1894, his father was killed while riding a bronc. Muller was five years old. (Note: Dorothy Harmsen states that Muller was nine years old when his father died, which would have been in 1898.) In the story Break 'Em Gentle he tells of the tragic death of the father of a five year old boy.

Muller describes the education that he received as a child,

My education being sadly corrupted with years of such surroundings as cattle, bosses, cards, and... a mite of horse laraceny. I'm of the old school of cowpunching, when cowboying was done with a tough bronc, a good saddle, and a stout rope, and one followed the chuckwagons and slept under the stars. The sum total of my education adds up to only six months— three months each term for two winter seasons in a one-room country schoolhouse. I found school dull — and that is just the way it found me.

== World War I and 1920s ==
Muller helped train soldiers how to ride horses and helped break in wild horses for the Army during World War I. He moved to Chicago after the war and ran a sign shop. He headed west to Yellowstone National Park in 1920, where he sold his paintings to tourists. He worked in New York City as an illustrator and then worked as a ranch hand.

== Artist ==
Muller developed a talent for art as a boy and created and sold his paintings and illustrations, but it was awhile before the career was self-sustaining. In 1930, he returned to Chicago and had better luck selling his paintings of western scenes. His first major sale was for a roundup picture that was purchased by Mr. Anderson of the Anderson Art Company in Chicago.

Muller made oil and watercolor paintings and works using pastels. He painted with great detail, aided by his photographic memory. Muller skillfully depicted the anatomy of horses and other elements in his paintings, while also intending to be historically accurate. According to Gladys Rowley, Muller was said to have captured the "toss of head, look of eyes, and tenseness or ease of muscles." He used western props to set the scenes for his works, including boots, hats, pistols, and saddles.

Muller created pen and ink drawings for Break 'Em Gentle, a true story, that was published in the first issue of Esquire magazine in 1933. (Note: In 1939, Muller stated that the story was true, but not autobiographical.) He received a commission to create murals for Chicago's World Fair (Century of Progress) in 1933. The paintings, described as "immense", were entitled The Stage Coach, The Covered Wagon, and the Pony Express Attack. Muller won a gold medal and a cash prize of $1,200 (equivalent to $29,846 in 2025) for three murals that he made depicting western life in the Travel and Transportation building.

Charles Marion "Charlie" Russell, a leader of the Western American Art movement provided encouragement and inspiration for himself and other creators, like Olaf C. Seltzer, Charles Beil, and Joe De Yong. Muller, like Will James, found an audience for their works that "combined artistic and prose skills... for their popular rendition of the West."

While in Nevada during the 1930s, he created murals for the Farley's Dude Ranch, Reno's Town House, and the Nevada Stock Farm and Dude Ranch, the latter of which was owned by George Wingfield.

Muller exhibited a painting at the 1936 Annual National Exhibit of American Art. With commissions for 25 paintings, Muller and his wife moved to Wisconsin in 1939. In the 1940s, Muller had a steady practice of making paintings that he supplied to art dealers. Muller's studio was made from a summer kitchen on his father-in-law, Emil Groeschel's former farm in Knellsville, Wisconsin.

His works are in museums and private collections throughout the Americas and Europe. Two of Mullers watercolor paintings were altered with a fake signature of Russell to create a forgery. The same thing occurred with other artist's works.

== Writer ==
Muller wrote and illustrated books, including:

- Wyoming Trails, by 1936
- Horses, The Reilly & Lee Company, Chicago, 1936
- Chico of the Cross Up (+ Up) ranch, The Reilly & Lee Company, Chicago, 1938 of a boy and his palomino colt
- My Life with Buffalo Bill, The Reilly & Lee Company, Chicago, by 1942 (Note: According to census records, Muller did not live with the Codys in 1900. That year, Cody only lived with his wife Louisa and daughter Irma. Muller claims to have a letter from Cody dated May 31, 1910 that was sent to Muller at Cody's ranch. It was written on Buffalo Bill's Wild West stationery.)
- Hell's Acres
- Rawhide is Tough

The American Association of Journalists and Authors made him an honorary member.

== Personal life ==
Muller moved to Nevada in 1935. Muller and Edna Groeschel, both who loved horses, were married while on horseback. The ceremony took place at a rodeo in Elko, Nevada, on May 26, 1936. Edna, born on April 28, 1904, was the daughter of Emil Groeschel. In 1940, Muller and Edna lived with her father, Emil Groeschel, in Port Washington, Wisconsin. The Mullers lived by themselves in Port Washington in 1950.

Muller died on December 4, 1976. Edna died on November 11, 1985, at her Port Washington home. They were buried at Union Cemetery in Port Washington.
