= Beil (surname) =

Beil is a German surname. Derived from the Geman word meaning 'axe' or 'hatchet', most commonly, it is an occupational surname for a person who deals with these tools: carpenter, hatchet smith, etc. Other, less common origins exist. Notable people with the surname include:

- Caroline Beil (born 1966), German actress
- Charles Beil (1894–1976), Canadian sculptor
- Gerhard Beil (1926–2010), German politician
- Larry Beil, American sportscaster
- Larry Beil (American football) (1923–1986), American football player
- Ryan Beil, Canadian actor, comedian, and podcaster
- Vivien Beil (born 1995), German footballer
