= Charles Marion Russell =

American artist (1864–1926)

Charles M. Russell
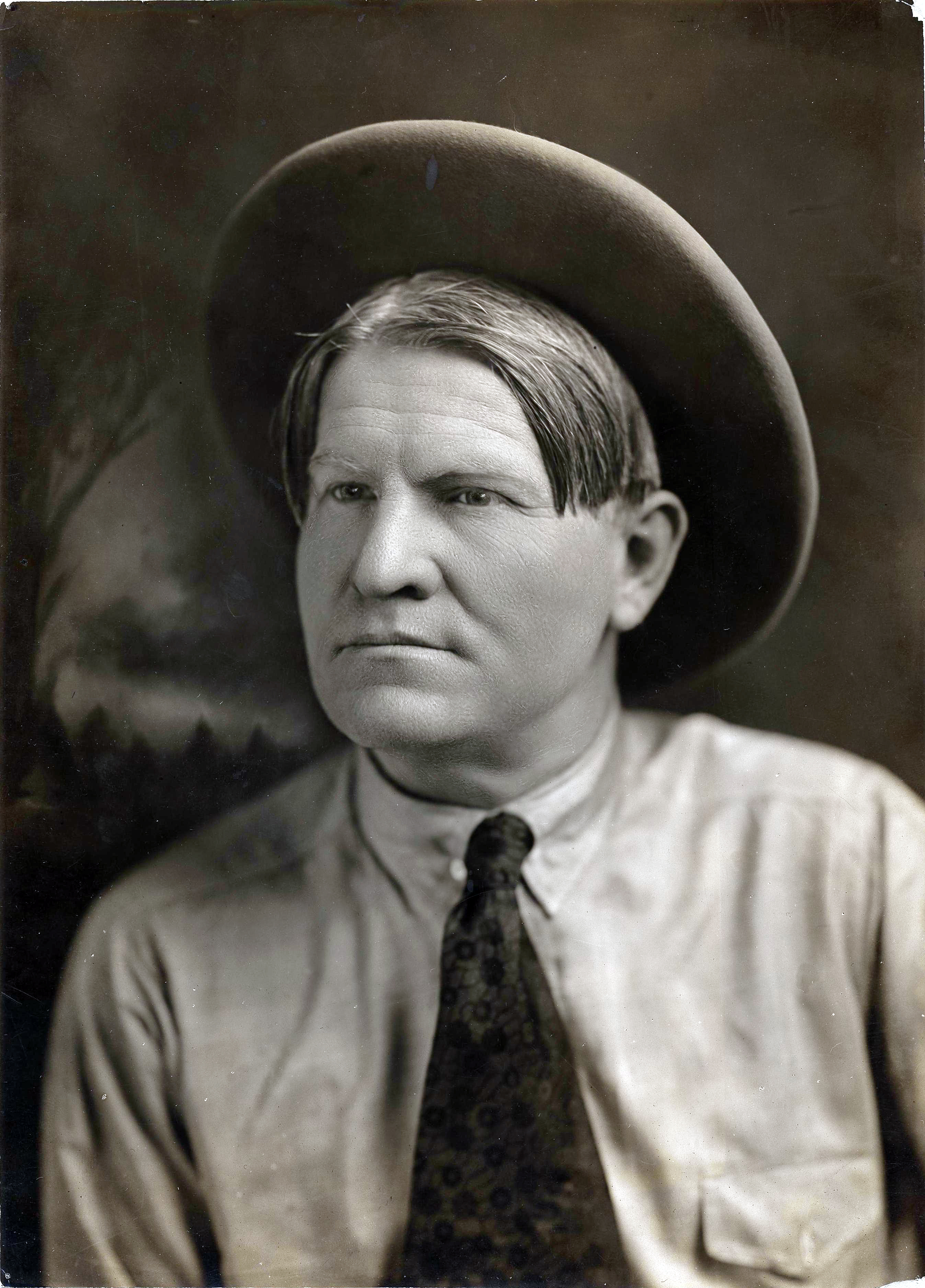
- Russell in 1907
- Born: March 19, 1864; St. Louis, Missouri, U.S.
- Died: October 24, 1926 (aged 62); Great Falls, Montana, U.S.
- Known for: Painting, bronze sculpture

Charles Marion Russell (Note: Also known by his aliases C. M. Russell, Charlie Russell, and "Kid" Russell) (March 19, 1864 – October 24, 1926) was an American artist credited for his prolific work of more than 2,000 paintings of cowboys, Native Americans, and landscapes set in the western United States and in Alberta, Canada, in addition to bronze sculptures. He is known as "the cowboy artist" and was also a storyteller and author. Russell became an advocate for Native Americans in the west, supporting the bid by landless Chippewa to have a reservation established for them in Montana. In 1916, Congress passed legislation to create the Rocky Boy Reservation.

The C. M. Russell Museum Complex in Great Falls, Montana houses more than 2,000 Russell artworks, personal objects, and artifacts. Other major collections are held at the Montana Historical Society in Helena, Montana, the Buffalo Bill Center of the West in Cody, Wyoming, the Amon Carter Museum of American Art in Fort Worth, Texas, the Sid Richardson Museum in Fort Worth, the National Cowboy & Western Heritage Museum in Oklahoma City, Oklahoma, and the Gilcrease Museum in Tulsa, Oklahoma. His 1912 mural Lewis and Clark Meeting Indians at Ross' Hole hangs in the House chambers of the Montana Capitol in Helena, and his 1918 painting Piegans sold for $5.6 million at a 2005 auction. In 1955, he was inducted into the Hall of Great Westerners of the National Cowboy & Western Heritage Museum.

== Childhood ==
Art was always a part of Russell's life. Growing up in Missouri, he drew sketches and made clay figures of animals. Russell had an intense interest in the "wild west" and would spend hours reading about it. Russell would watch explorers and fur traders who frequently came through Missouri. He learned to ride horses at Hazel Dell Farm near Jerseyville, Illinois, on a famous Civil War horse named Great Britain. Russell's instructor was Col. William H. Fulkerson, who had married into the Russell family. At the age of sixteen, Russell left school and went to Montana to work on a sheep ranch.

== Montana and the West ==
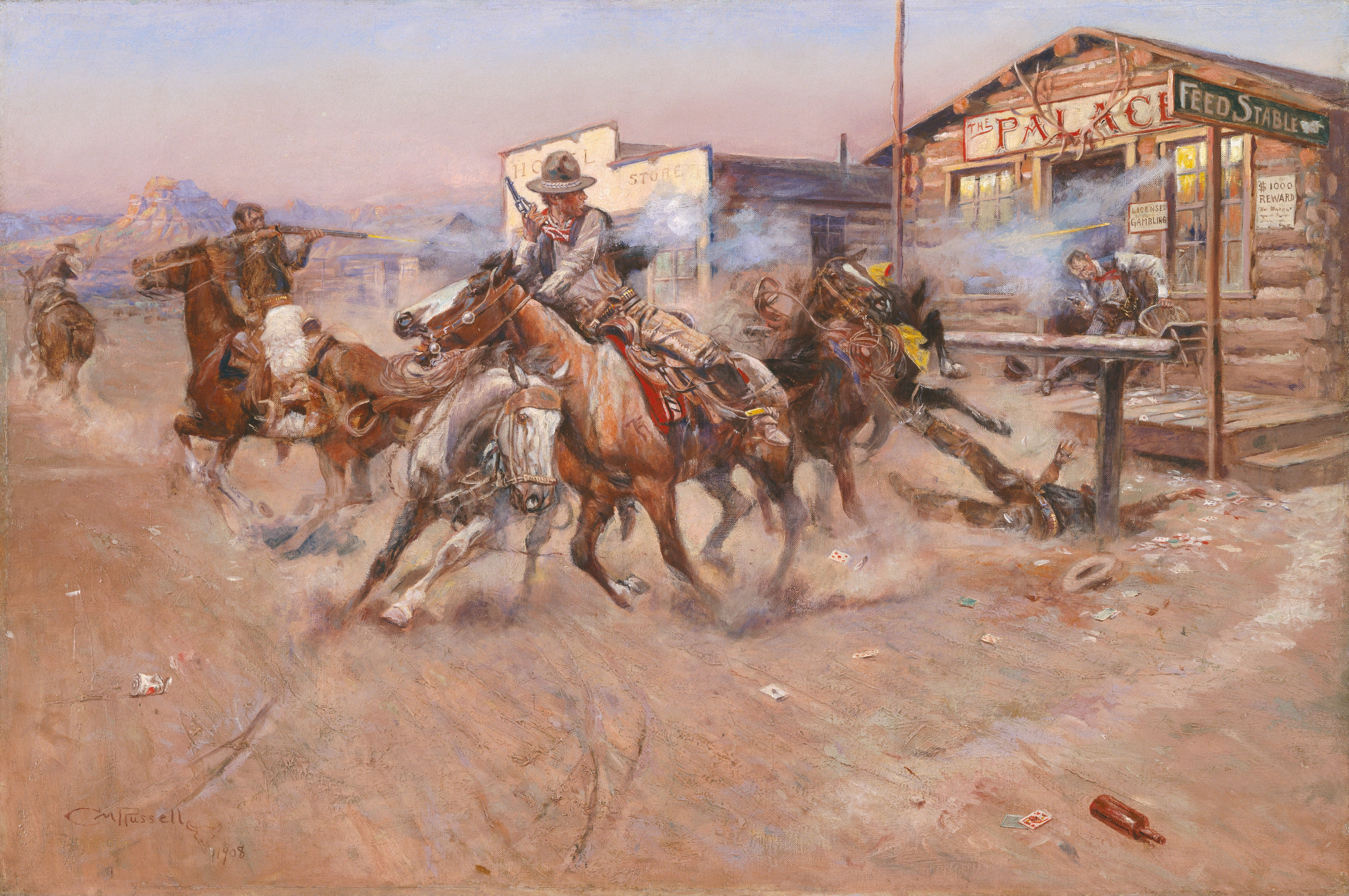
Smoke of a .45, oil on canvas, 1908

Russell left the sheep ranch after a short time, and found work with Jake Hoover, a hunter and trapper who had become a rancher. Hoover owned land in the Judith Basin of Central Montana. Russell learned much about the ways of the West from him, and the two men remained lifelong friends. After a brief visit in 1882 to his family in Missouri, Russell returned to Montana, and lived and worked there for the remainder of his life.

He worked as a cowboy for a number of outfits, and documented the harsh winter of 1886–1887 in a number of watercolors. Russell was working on the O-H Ranch in the Judith Basin at the time. The ranch foreman received a letter from the owner, asking how the cattle herd had weathered the winter. In reply, the foreman sent a postcard-sized watercolor that Russell had painted of a gaunt steer being watched by wolves under a gray winter sky. The ranch owner showed the postcard to friends and business acquaintances, and eventually displayed it in a shop window in Helena, Montana. After this, the artist began to receive commissions for new work. Russell's caption on the sketch, Waiting for a Chinook, became the title of the watercolor. Russell later painted a more detailed version of the scene which became one of his best-known works.

Beginning in 1888, Russell spent a period living with the Blood Indians, a branch of the Blackfeet nation. Scholars believe that he gained much of his intimate knowledge of Native American culture during this period. When he returned to the Judith Basin in 1889, he found it filling with settlers. He worked in more open places for a couple of years before settling in the area of Great Falls, Montana, in 1892. There he worked to make a living as a full-time artist.

In 1896, Russell married his wife Nancy Cooper. He was 32 and she was 18. In 1897, they moved from the small community of Cascade, Montana to the bustling county seat of Great Falls. Russell spent the majority of the remainder of his life there. He continued with his art, becoming a local celebrity and gaining the acclaim of critics worldwide. As Russell was not skilled in marketing his work, Nancy is generally given credit for making him an internationally known artist. She set up many shows for Russell throughout the United States and in London, creating many followers.

In 1906 Russell's The Bull Head Lodge and Studio was completed. It is located off Going-to-the-Sun Road in Glacier National Park, and was Russell's summer home. It is listed on the National Register of Historic Places.

In 1912 he was joined by cowboy artist Frank Tenney Johnson on a sketching expedition to the Blackfoot Reservation east of Glacier National Park in Montana.

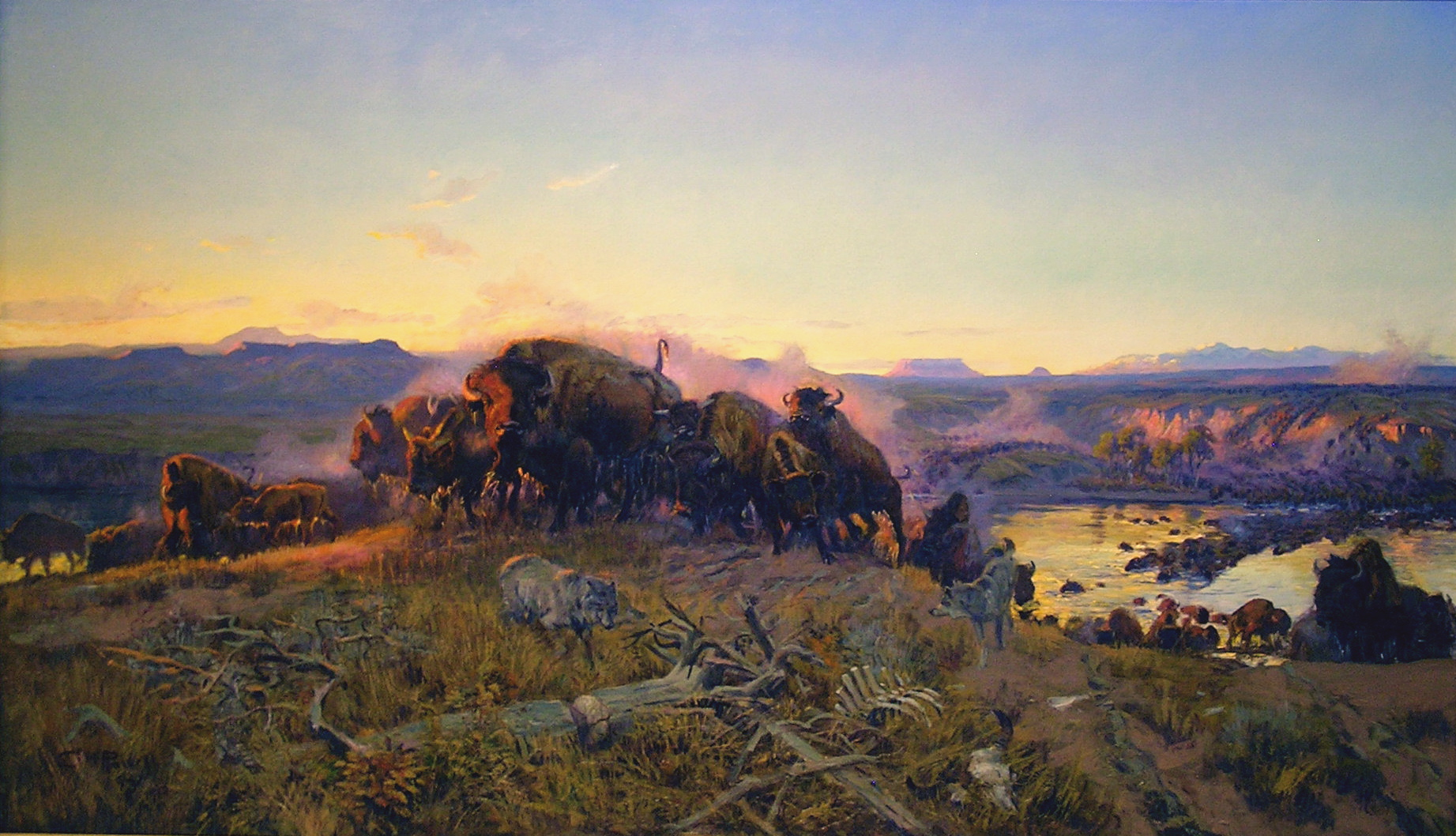
When The Land Belonged to God, 1914, replica image displayed for many years in the Montana Senate

In 1913, Russell painted Wild Horse Hunters, which depicts riders capturing wild horses, each band of which is dominated by a stallion. He used as much color as an artist could on his mountain landscapes. As an artist, Russell emerged at a time when the Wild West was of intense interest to people who lived in cities, and cattle drives were still being conducted over long distances. He painted images of the Old West that were later adopted by Westerns, which became a movie staple.

Russell was fond of these popular art forms and made many friends among the well-off collectors of his works, including actors and film makers such as William S. Hart, Harry Carey, Will Rogers, and Douglas Fairbanks. Russell also kept up with fellow artists of the West, including painter Edgar Samuel Paxson, painter Edward "Ed" Borein, illustrator and painter Maynard Dixon and Will Crawford the illustrator.

On the day of Russell's funeral in 1926, the children in Great Falls were released from school so they could watch the funeral procession. Russell's coffin was displayed in a glass-sided coach, pulled by four black horses.

Russell produced about 4,000 works of art, including oil and watercolor paintings, drawings and sculptures in wax, clay, plaster and other materials, some of which were also cast in bronze.

== Depictions of Charles Marion Russell ==
Works by others

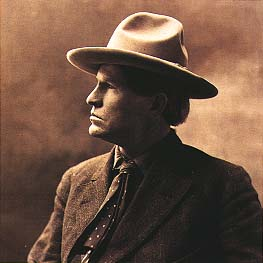
Portrait by A.O. Gregory

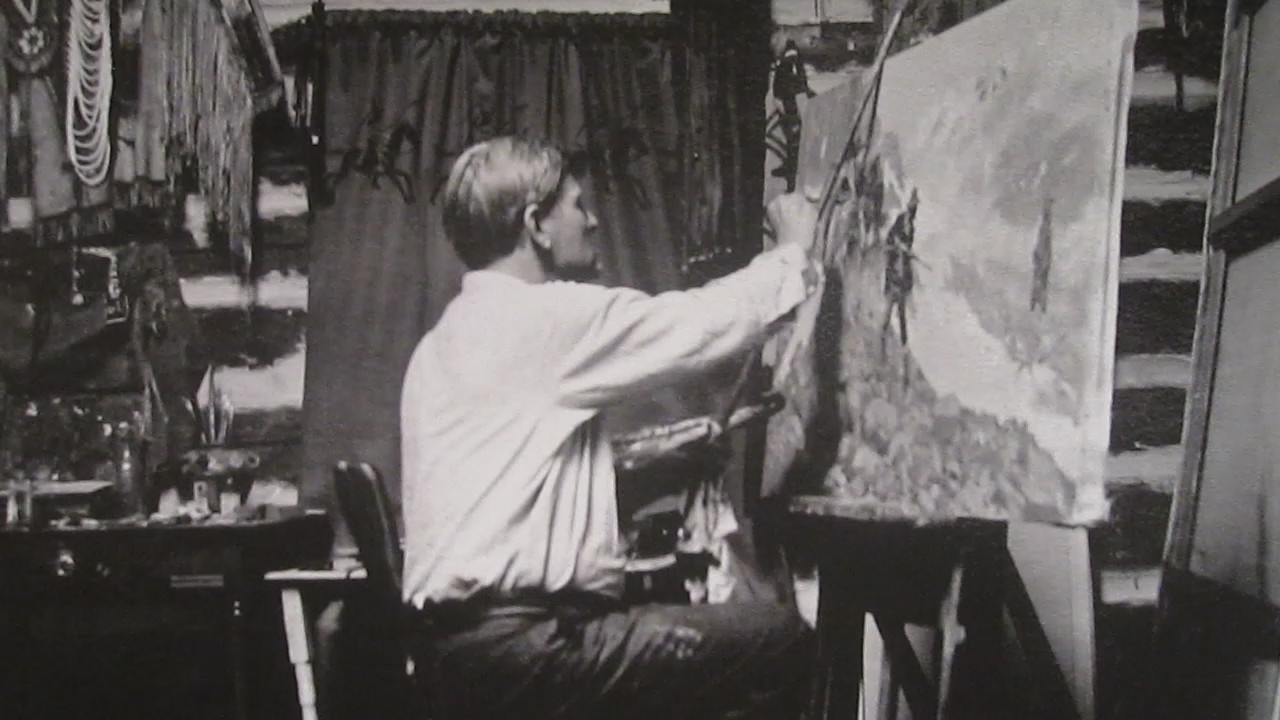
Russell working in his studio in Great Falls, Montana

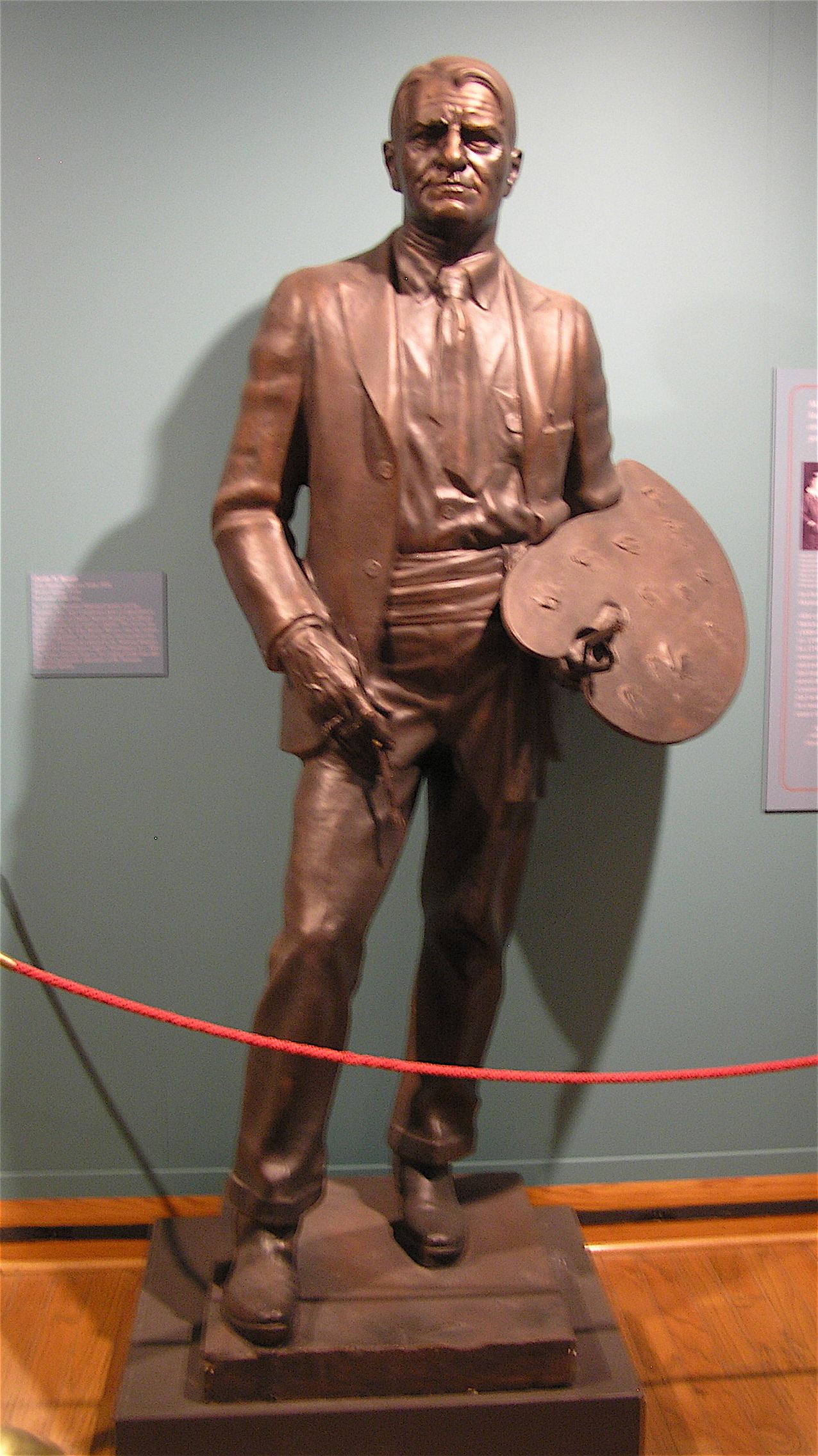
C. M. Russell statue by John Weaver; Identical statues are held in the National Statuary Hall Collection and by the Montana Historical Society.

Statue of Charles Marion Russell in the National Statuary Hall Collection in the U.S. Capitol Building in Washington D.C.
Charles Marion Russell portraits

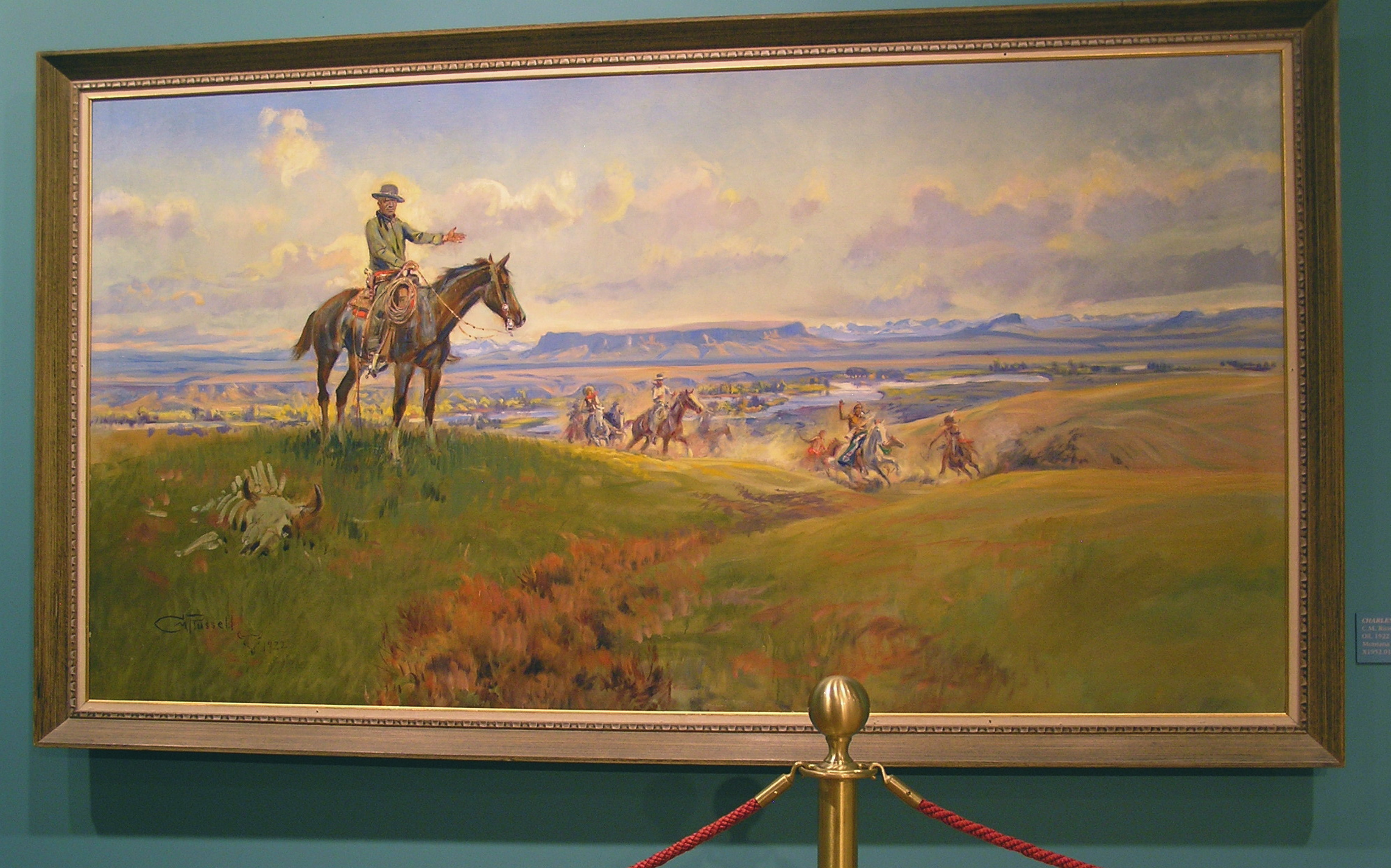
C. M. Russell and his friends. A detail of the picture was used for a Montana U.S. Postage Stamp in 1989.

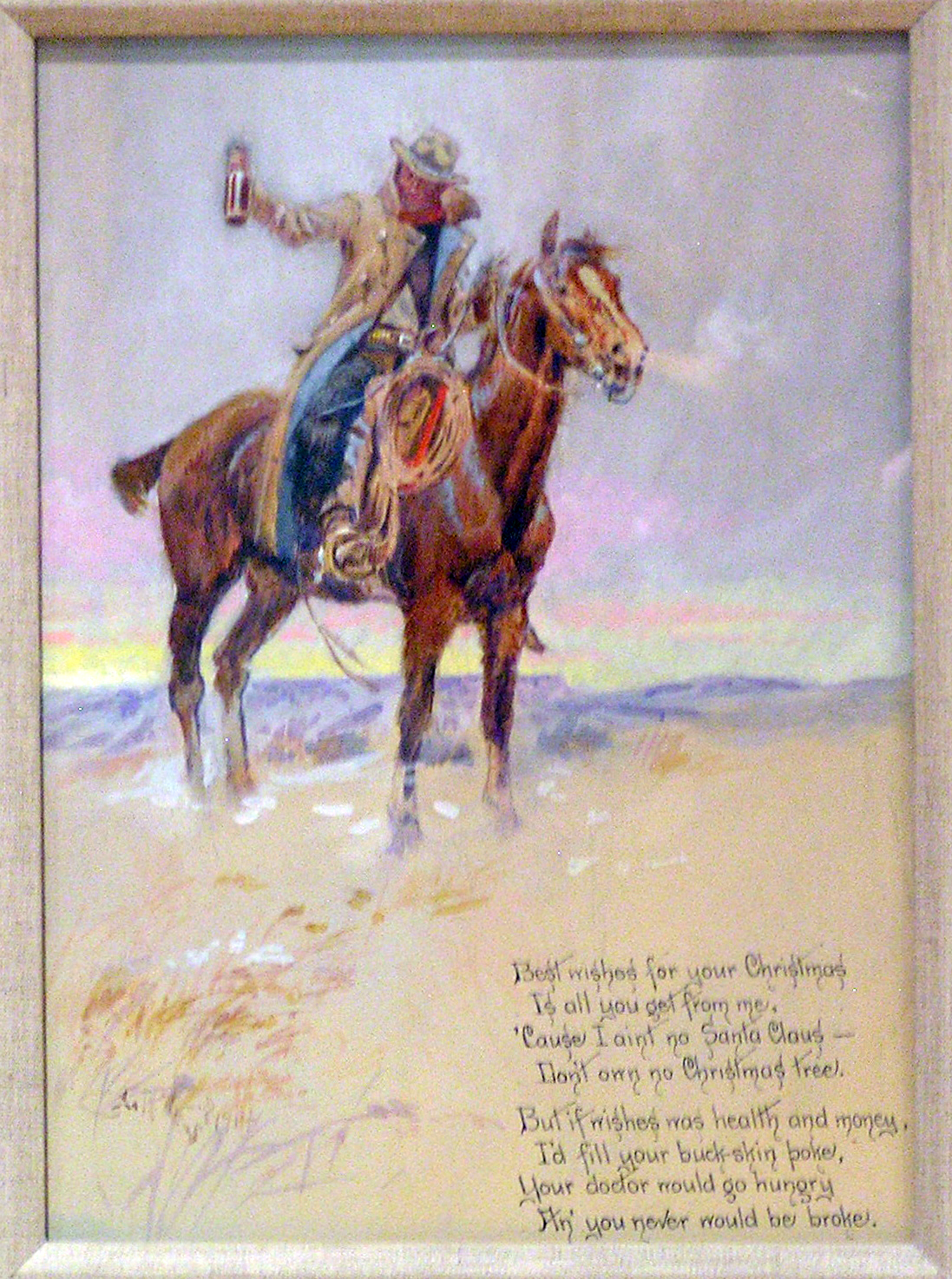
Self-portrait with Christmas greeting, 1914

== Tributes ==
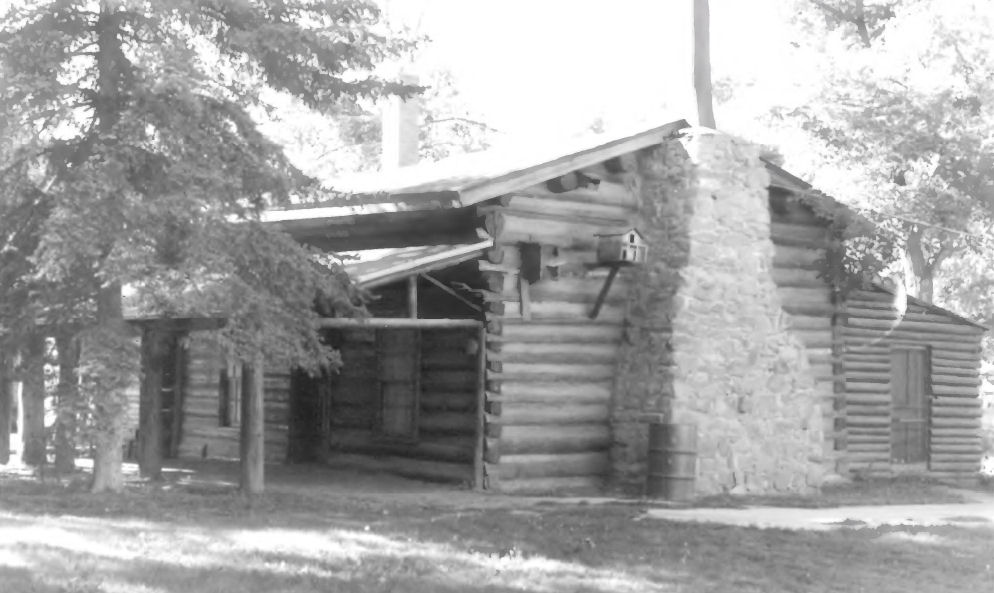
Russell's log cabin studio, in Great Falls, Montana. Preserved and now part of the C. M. Russell Museum Complex

A collection of Russell's short stories called Trails Plowed Under was published a year after his death.

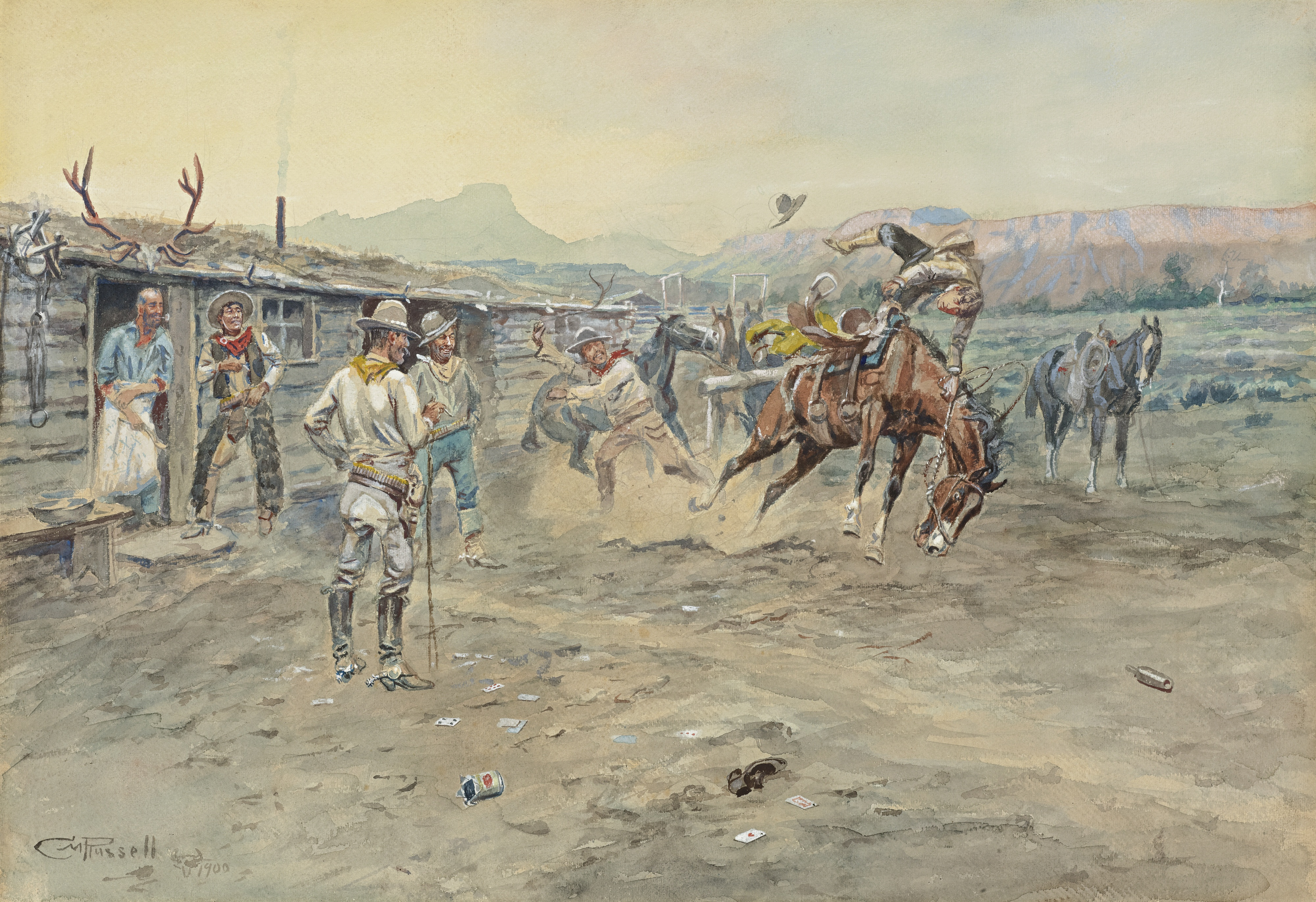
The Tenderfoot (1900)

In 1960, Charles M. Russell Elementary School was built in Missoula, Montana. In 1965, a high school was built on the north side of the Missouri River in Great Falls, Montana and named Charles M. Russell High School, in honor of Russell. Ian Tyson's 1987 album, Cowboyography, includes a song titled "The Gift" telling the story of Russell. Michael Nesmith, of Monkees fame, recorded a song titled "Laugh Kills Lonesome" which was inspired by, and describes the contents of, a well-known Russell painting of the same name. Native Blackfeet folk singer Jack Gladstone wrote a song dedicated to Russell titled "When the Land Belonged to God." The song describes Russell's painting of the same name.

In 1985, Russell was inducted into the Society of Illustrators Hall of Fame in New York. In 1991, Russell was inducted into the St. Louis Walk of Fame.

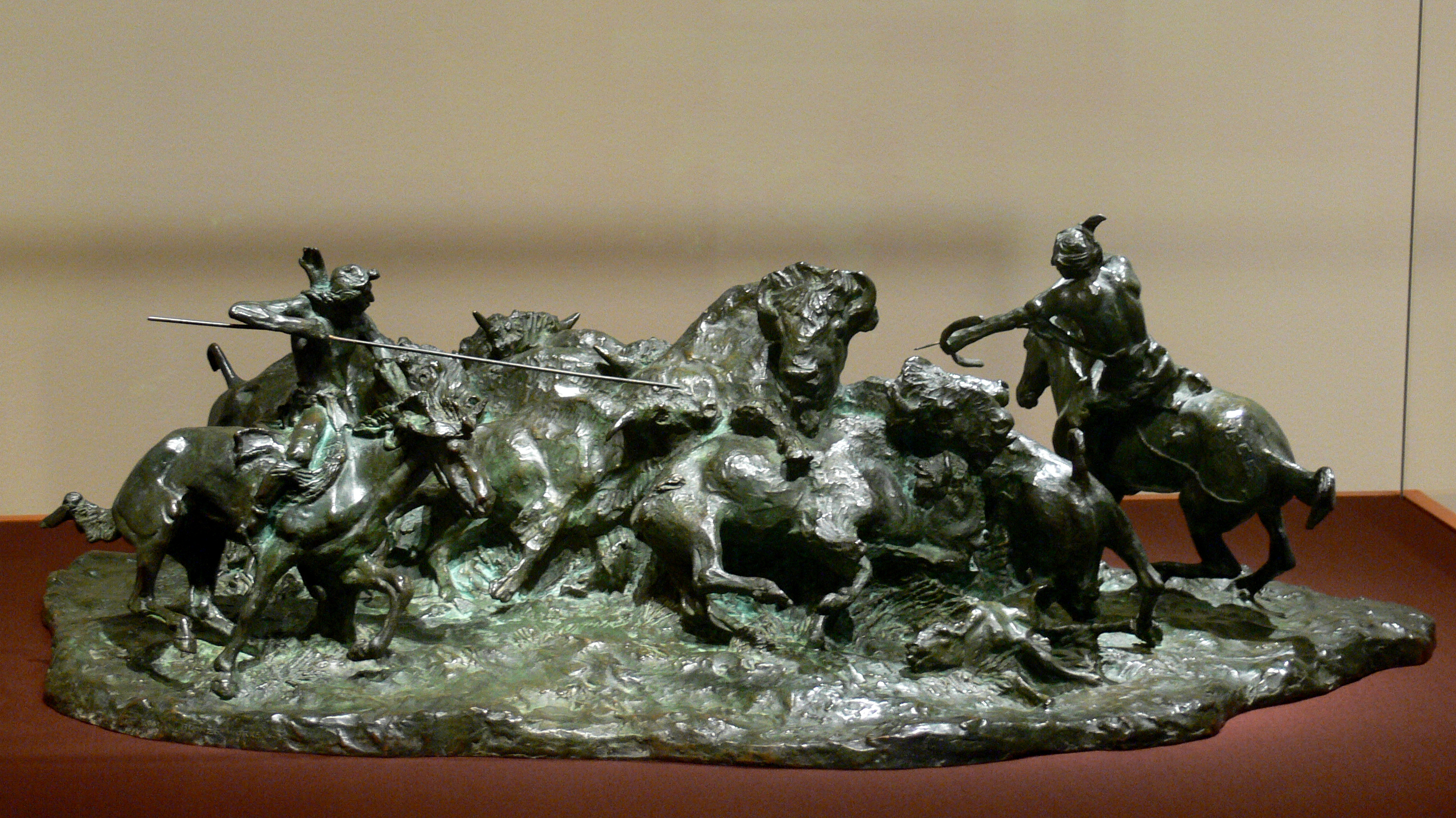
Meat for Wild Men, bronze sculpture, depicting a buffalo hunt

Some of Russell's paintings were shown during the credits of the ABC television series How the West Was Won, starring James Arness. James McDowell Sr. of Tulsa, Oklahoma donated 24 volumes of his illustrations to the Western History Collections at the University of Oklahoma in 1997.

Russell was inducted into the inaugural class of the Montana Outdoor Hall of Fame in 2014. He is honored at the Stockmen's Memorial in Cochrane, Alberta, Canada.

The Charles M. Russell National Wildlife Refuge is named for Russell, a World War II Liberty Ship, SS Charles M. Russell, was named in his honor and launched in 1943 in Portland, Oregon.

In 1959 a statue of Russell was placed in the National Statuary Hall Collection in the United States Capitol Building in Washington D.C.

== Auction ==
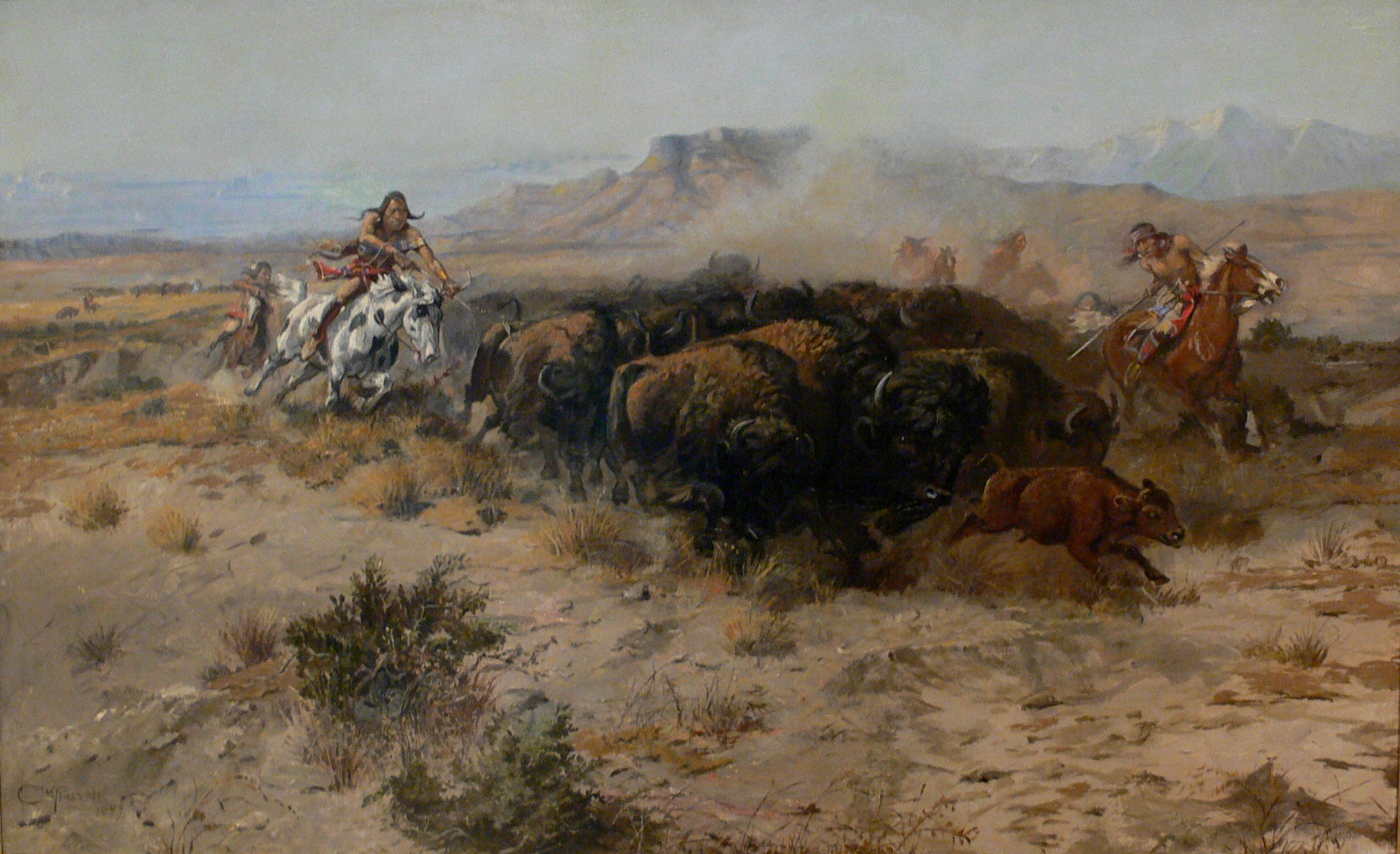
The Buffalo Hunt 1899. Amon Carter Museum, Fort Worth

Russell's Piegans sold in 2005 for $5.6 million, more than double the highest price his work had sold for a few years earlier. At auction in 2008, Russell's oil painting The Hold Up (20 Miles to Deadwood) sold for $5.2 million, and his bronze sculpture Buffalo Hunt (which depicted two Native Americans attacking a running bison) sold for $4.1 million. In July 2009, Russell's 1907 watercolor and gouache The Truce went for $2.03 million to an anonymous phone bidder. Russell's 1911 18 inches (460 mm) by 13 inches (330 mm) bronze sculpture, Bronc Twister, auctioned in 2008 for $805,000—far above the $300,000 pre-auction estimate.

In July 2011, the price of Russell's work soared again. His 1892 oil painting Water for Camp (depicting Native American women dipping pots into a stream) and his 1924 watercolor A Dangerous Sport (in which two cowboys lasso a mountain lion) sold for nearly $1.5 million each.

A collection of 30 pieces of Russell's art were sold for several million dollars at the Coeur d'Alene Art Auction (held in Reno, Nevada) in July 2014, setting new records for many pieces. Russell's Trail of the Iron Horse watercolor (depicting a group of horseback Native Americans contemplating railroad track) sold for $1.9 million, while Dakota Chief (which depicts a young Lakota chieftain on horseback) was auctioned for $1.1 million (almost double the last price it commanded). Even small pencil sketches sold for $25,000.

== Notable works ==
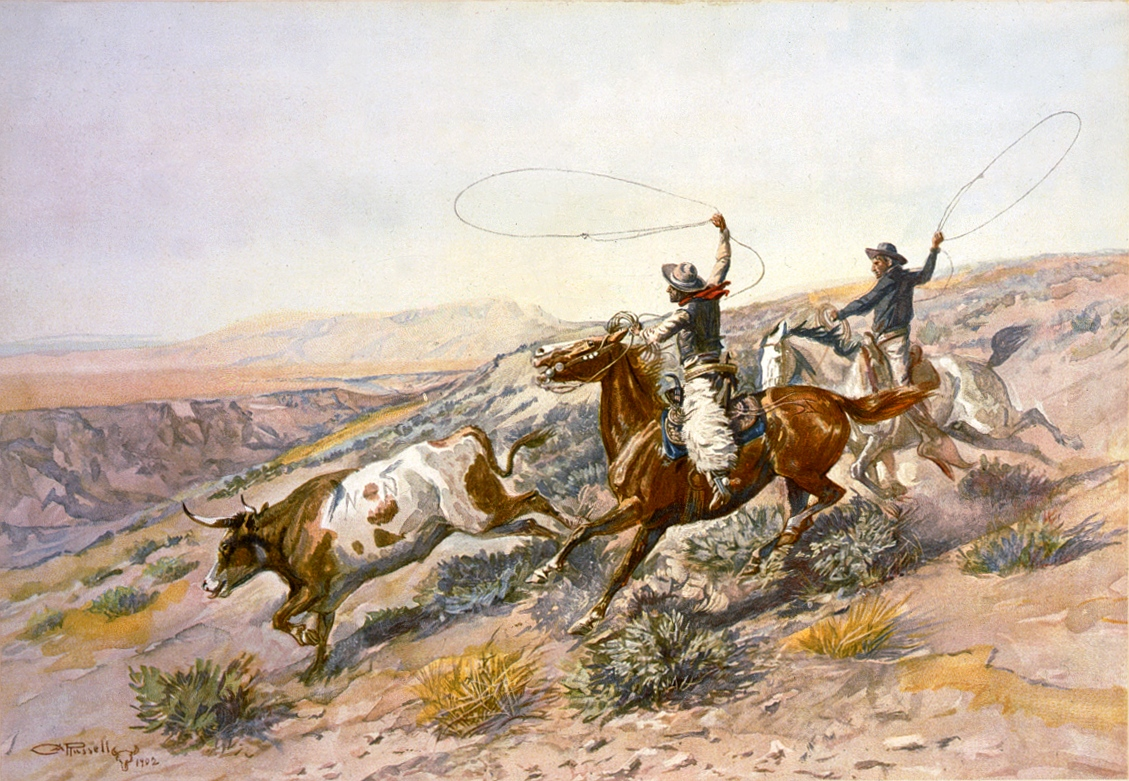
Buccaroos, 1902

Russell's works comprised a wide variety of topics, including major historical events and everyday life in the west. His work was noted for the frequency with which he portrayed well-known events from the point of view of Native American people instead of the non-Native viewpoint. He was noted for a keen eye on the social undercurrents of society and the meticulous authenticity with which he portrayed the clothing and equipment of both cowboys and Native people.

Historians studying women's roles in the West have critiqued Russell's portrayal of women. They note the contrasting levels of sensuality in his depictions of white and native women, as he seemed to transfer sexuality from white to Native women, so as to conform to the moral standards and perceptions of women in his time. Most of Russell's portrayals of white women are shown as "pure" and non-sexual, other than those paintings specifically depicting prostitutes. In contrast, his series of five Keeoma paintings and related images show a sensual native woman. They are documented by the statement that Keeoma was a real woman whom Russell had loved. Photographs exist that show the body model for these images was Russell's wife, Nancy.

=== Cowboy life ===
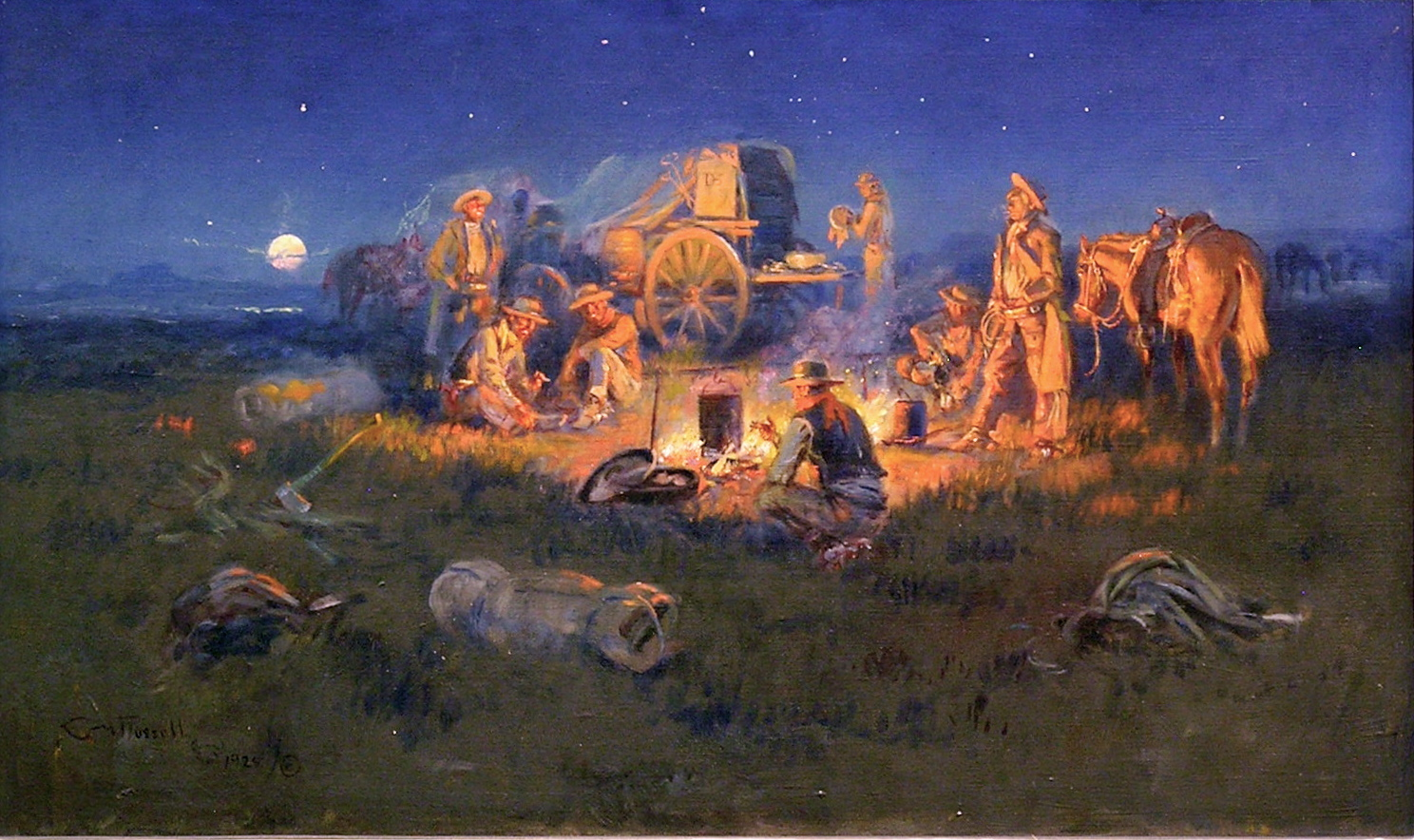
Laugh Kills Lonesome, oil on canvas, 1925. Along with Bronc to Breakfast and In Without Knocking, arguably the most famous of Russell's "cowboy" paintings.

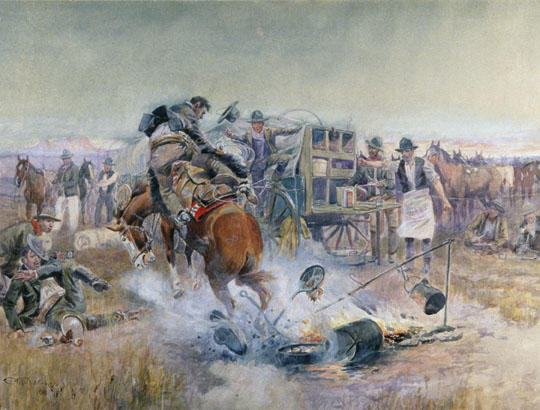
Bronc to Breakfast, oil, 1908

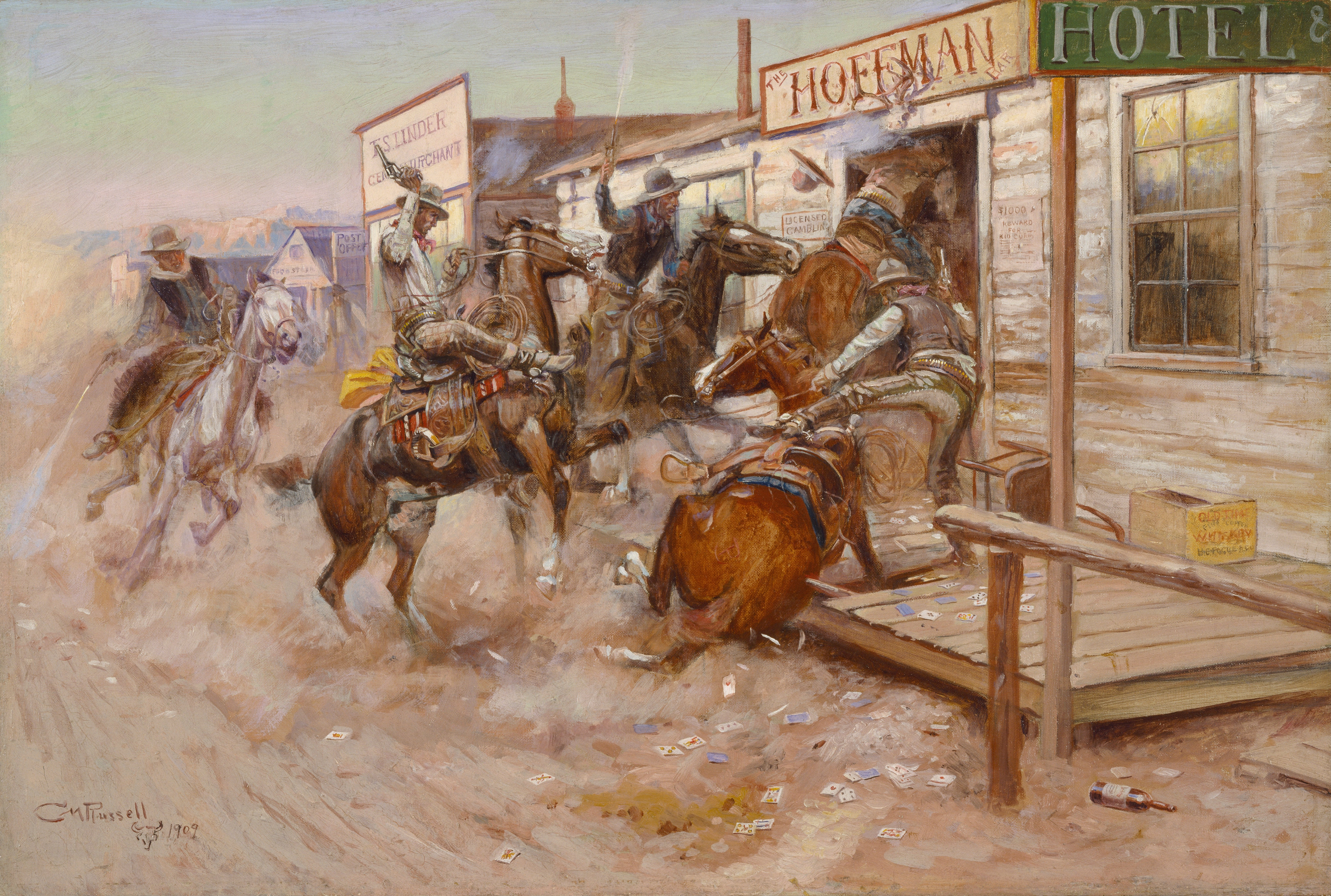
In Without Knocking 1909

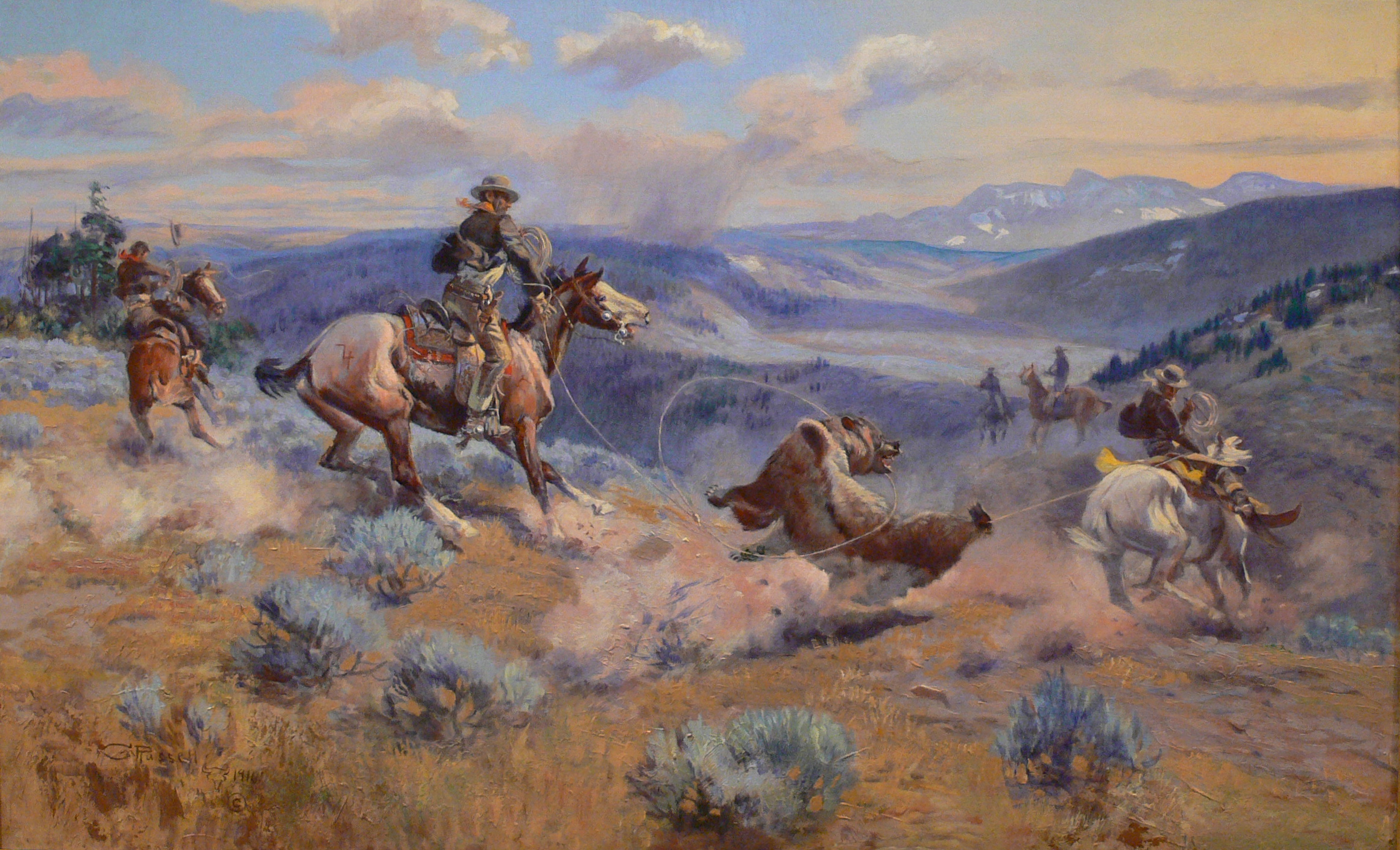
Loops and Swift Horses are Surer than Lead, 1916

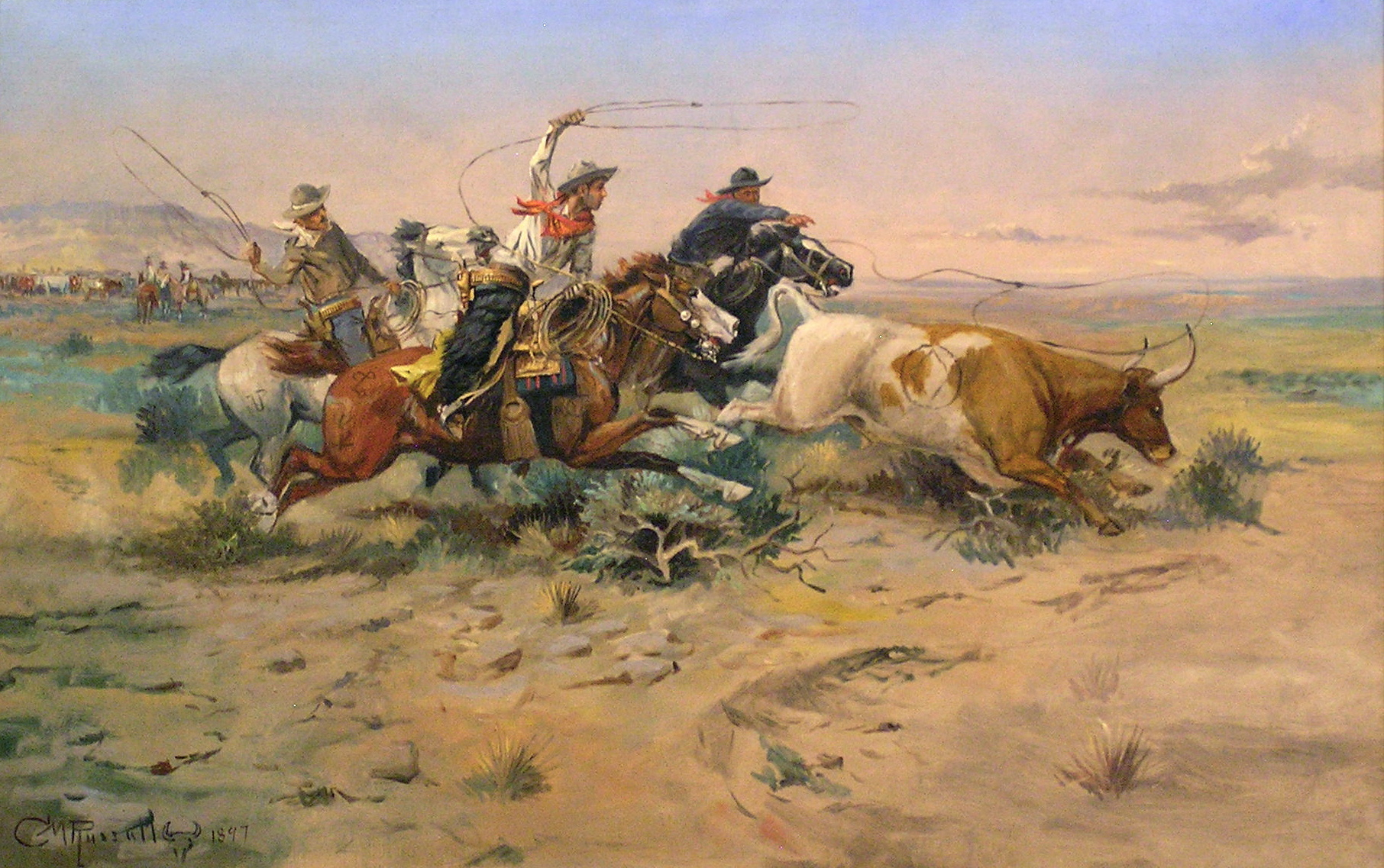
The Herd Quitter, oil on canvas, 1897

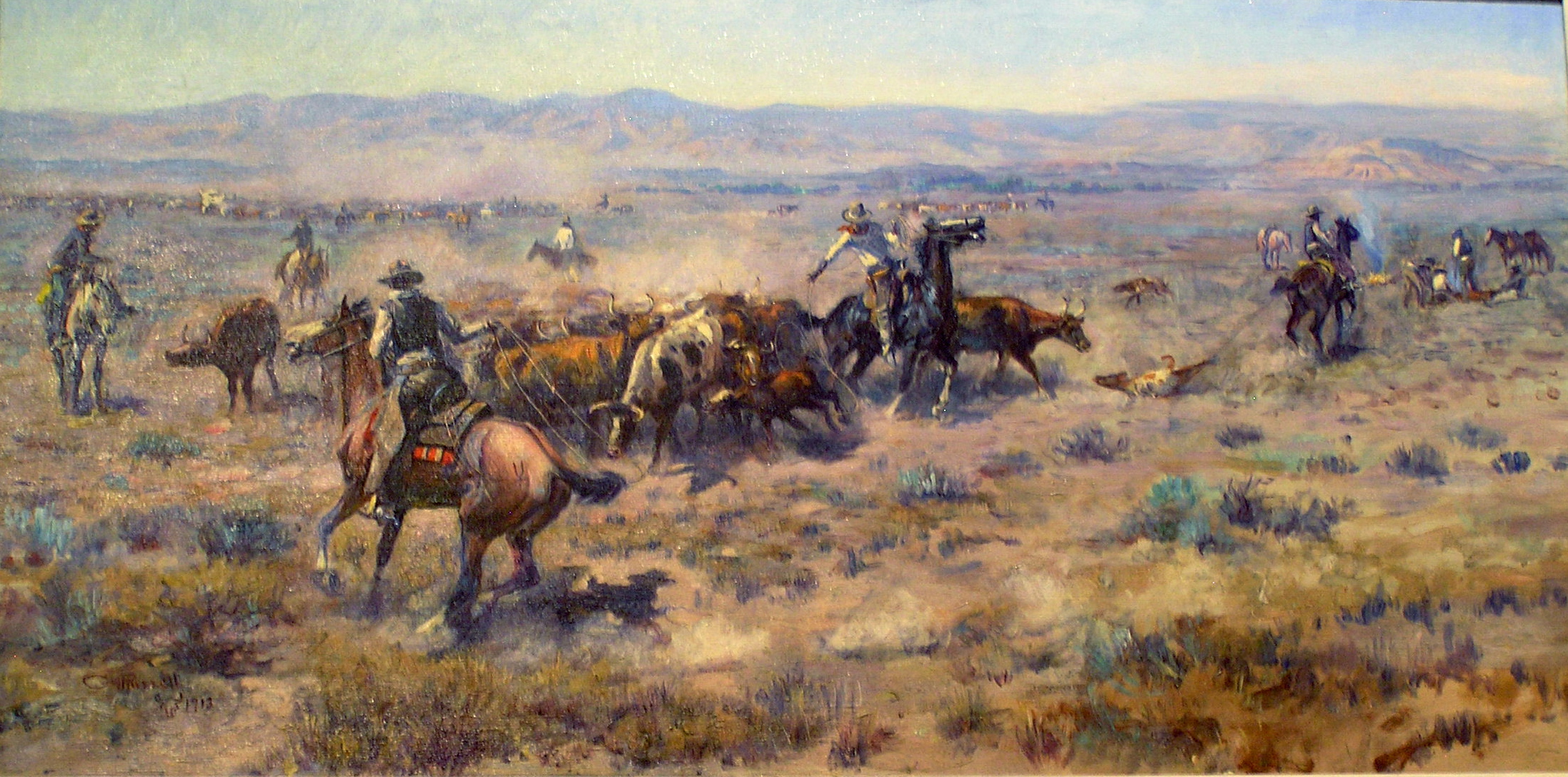
Roundup #2, oil 1913

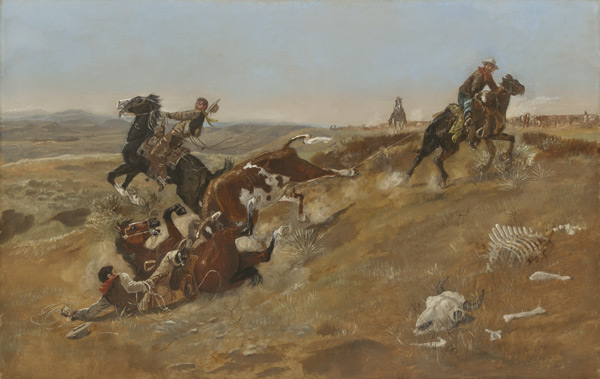
Cowpunching Sometimes Spells Trouble, 1889, Oil on canvas, Sid Richardson Museum, Fort Worth, Texas

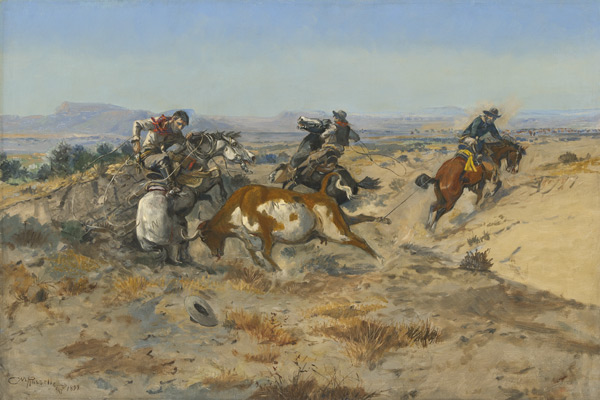
When Cowboys Get in Trouble (The Mad Cow), 1899, Oil on canvas, Sid Richardson Museum, Fort Worth, Texas

=== Native Americans ===
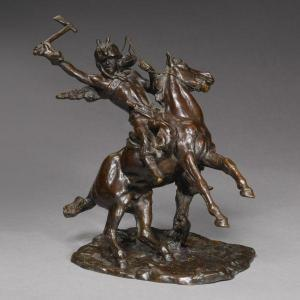
The Cryer, bronze sculpture

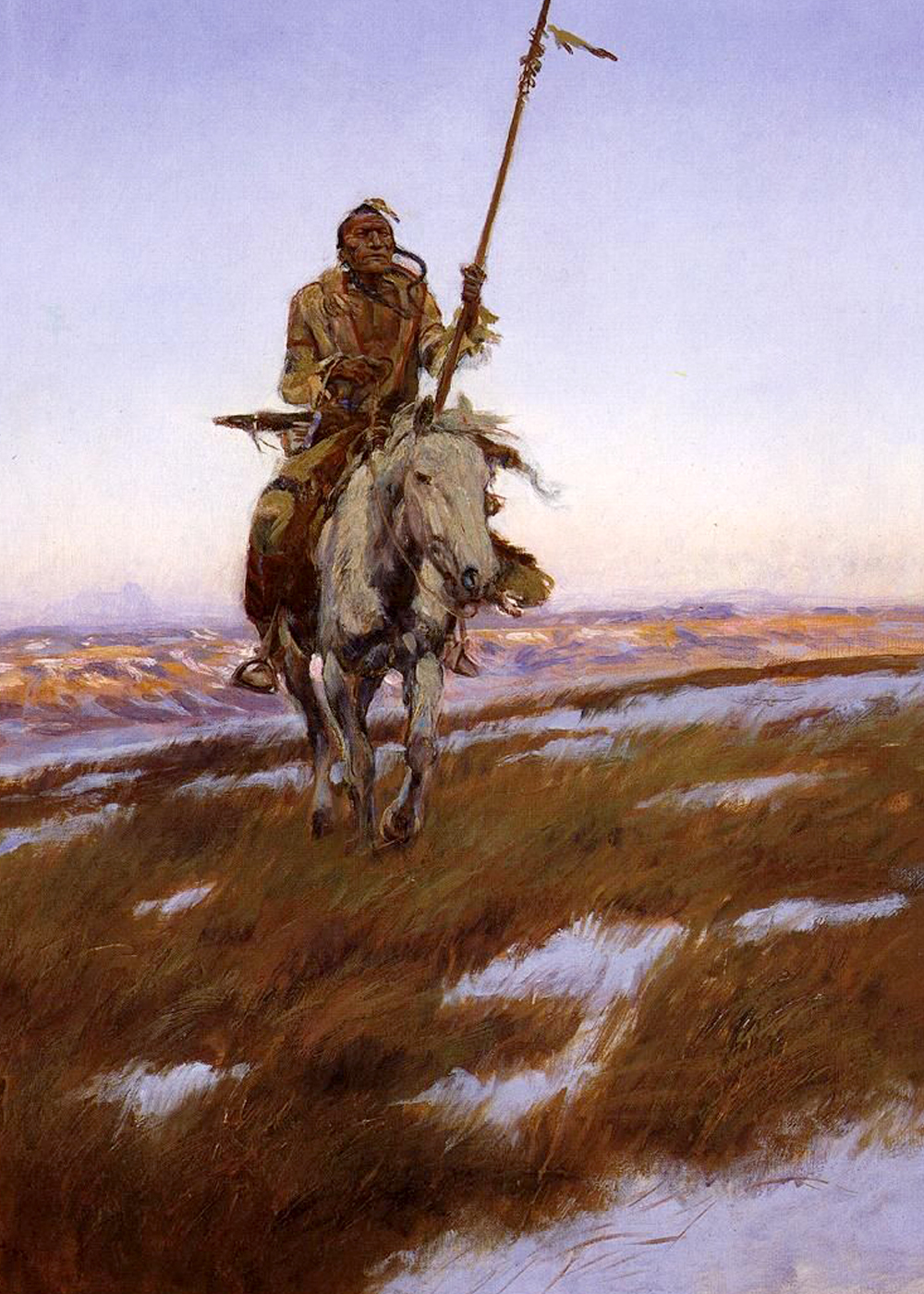
Cree Indian

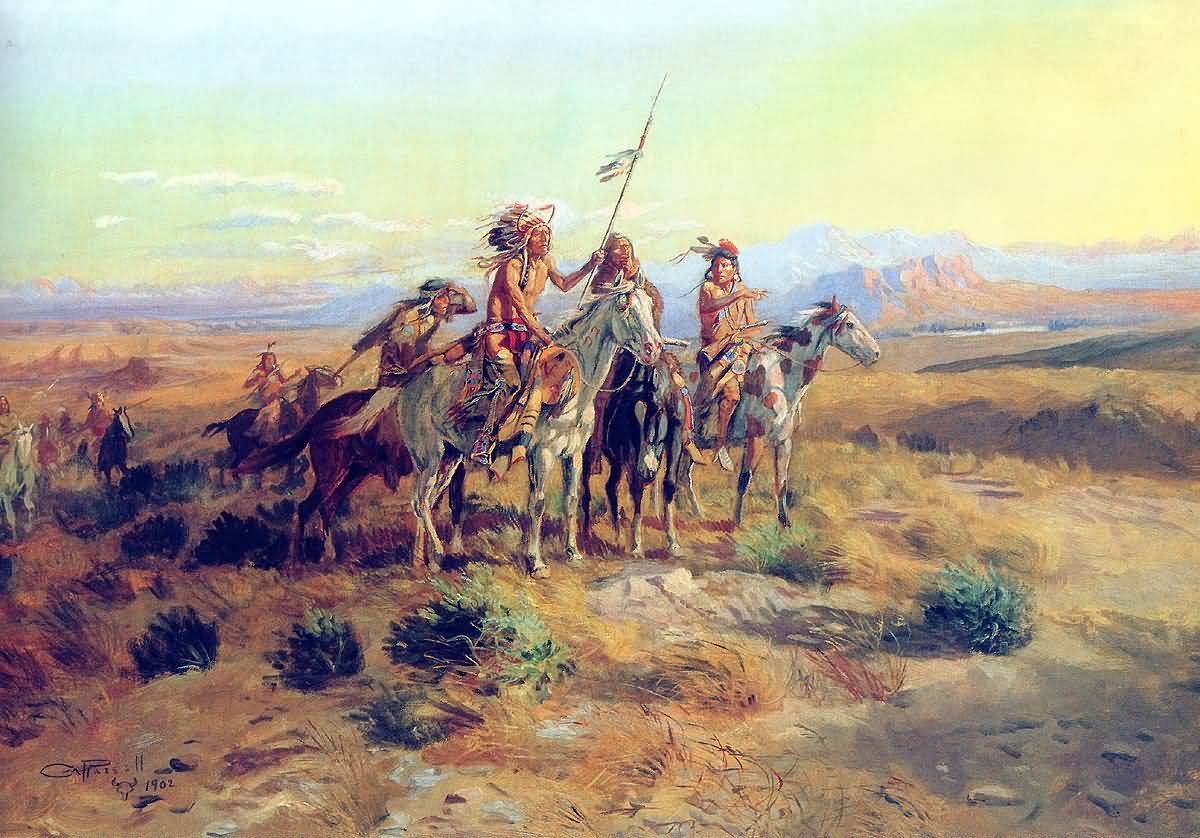
The Scouts

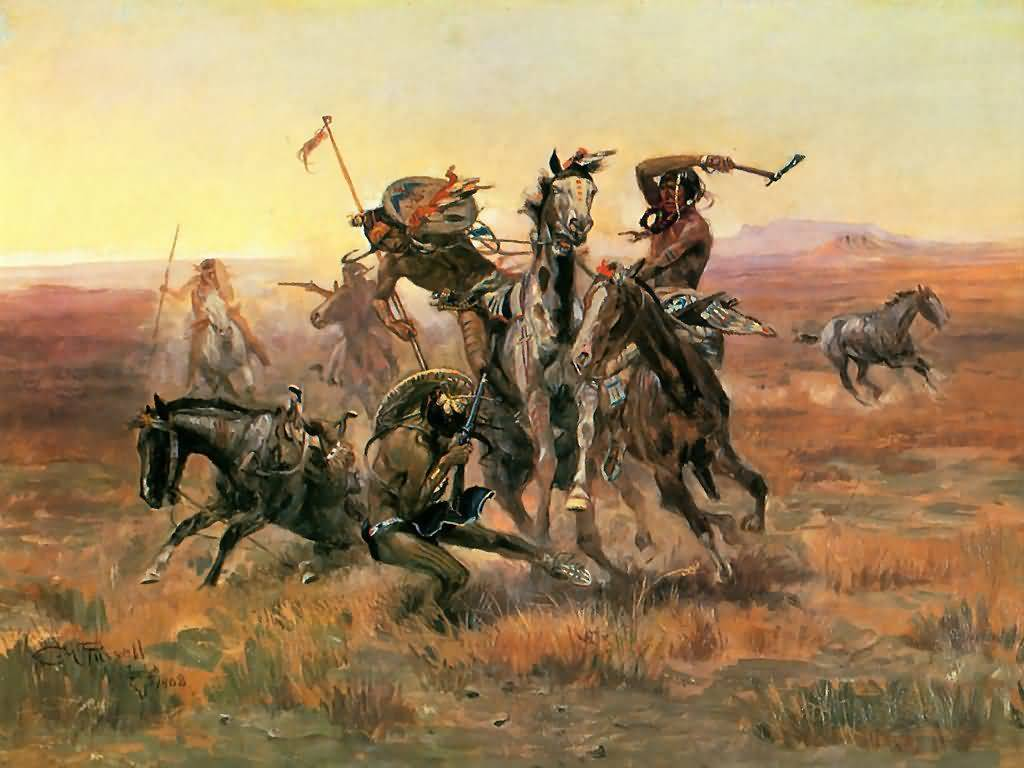
When Blackfoot and Sioux Meet

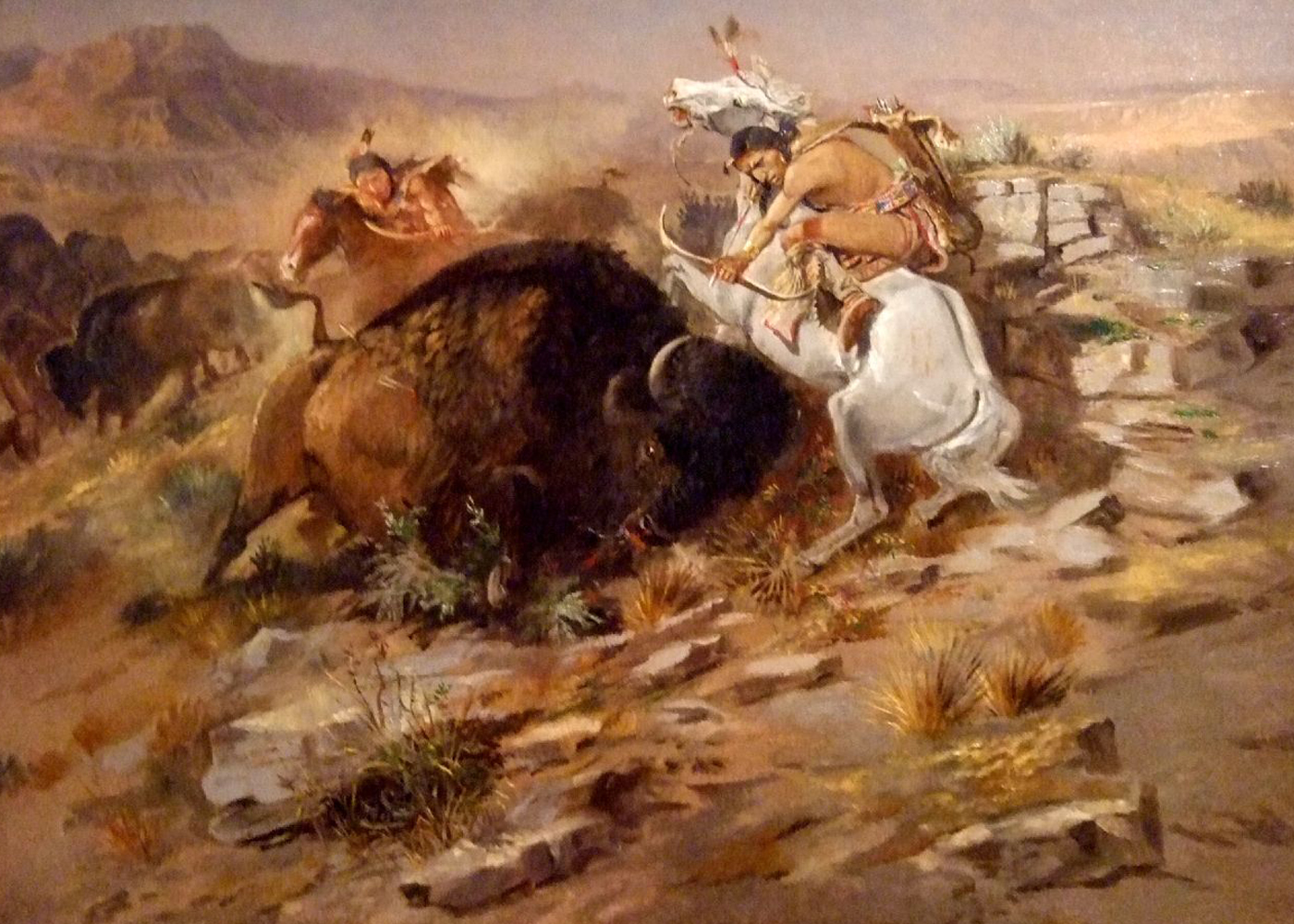
Buffalo Hunt

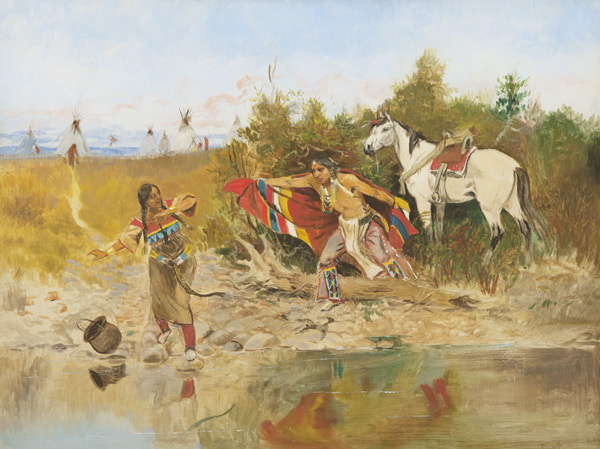
The Marriage Ceremony (Indian Love Call), 1894, Oil on cardboard, Sid Richardson Museum, Fort Worth, Texas

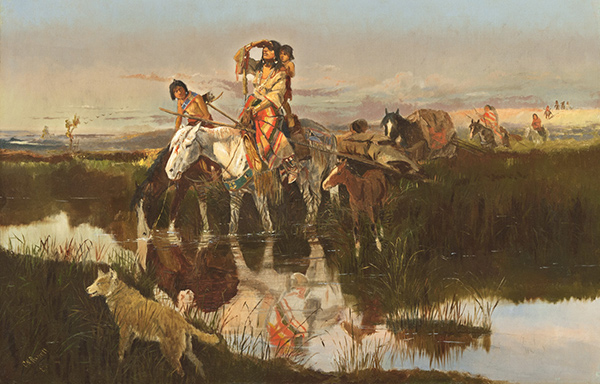
Bringing Up the Trail, 1895, Oil on canvas, Sid Richardson Museum, Fort Worth, Texas

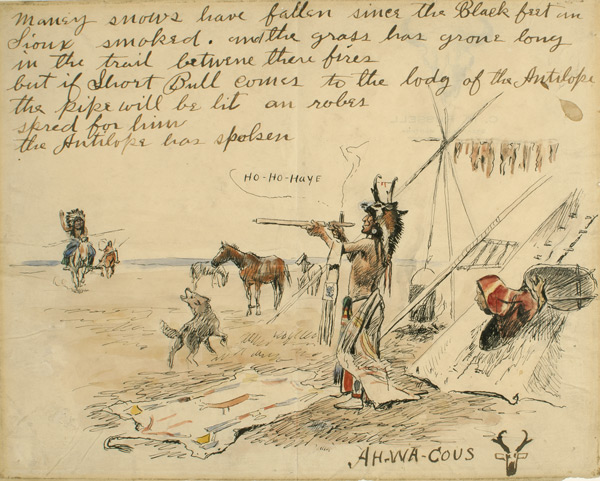
Maney Snows Have Fallen...(Letter from Ah-Wa-Cous (Charles Russell) to Short Bull), ca.1909 - 1910, Watercolor, pen & ink on paper, Sid Richardson Museum, Fort Worth, Texas

=== Women ===
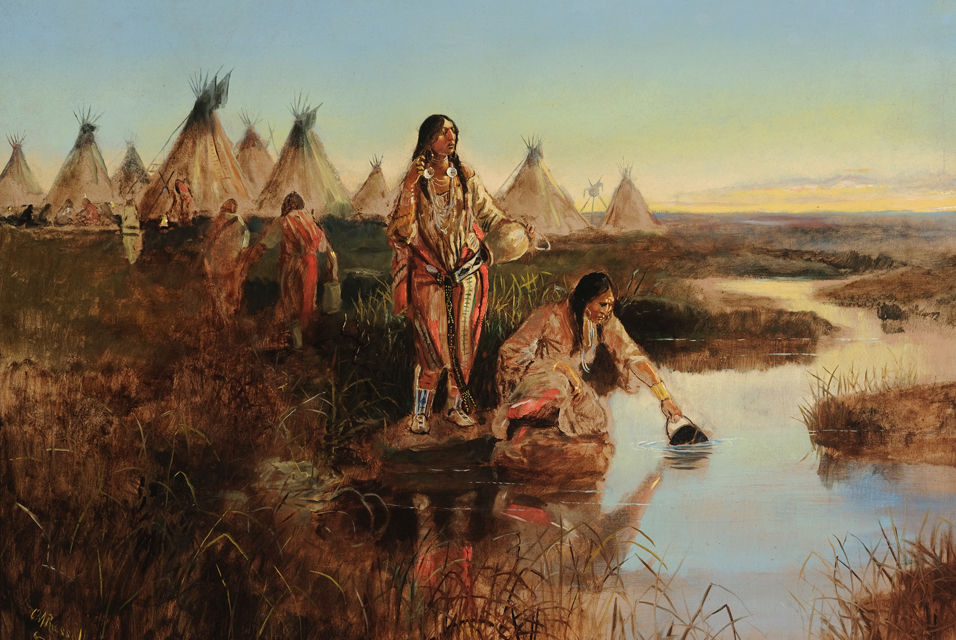
Water for Camp, depicting the everyday life of Native American women

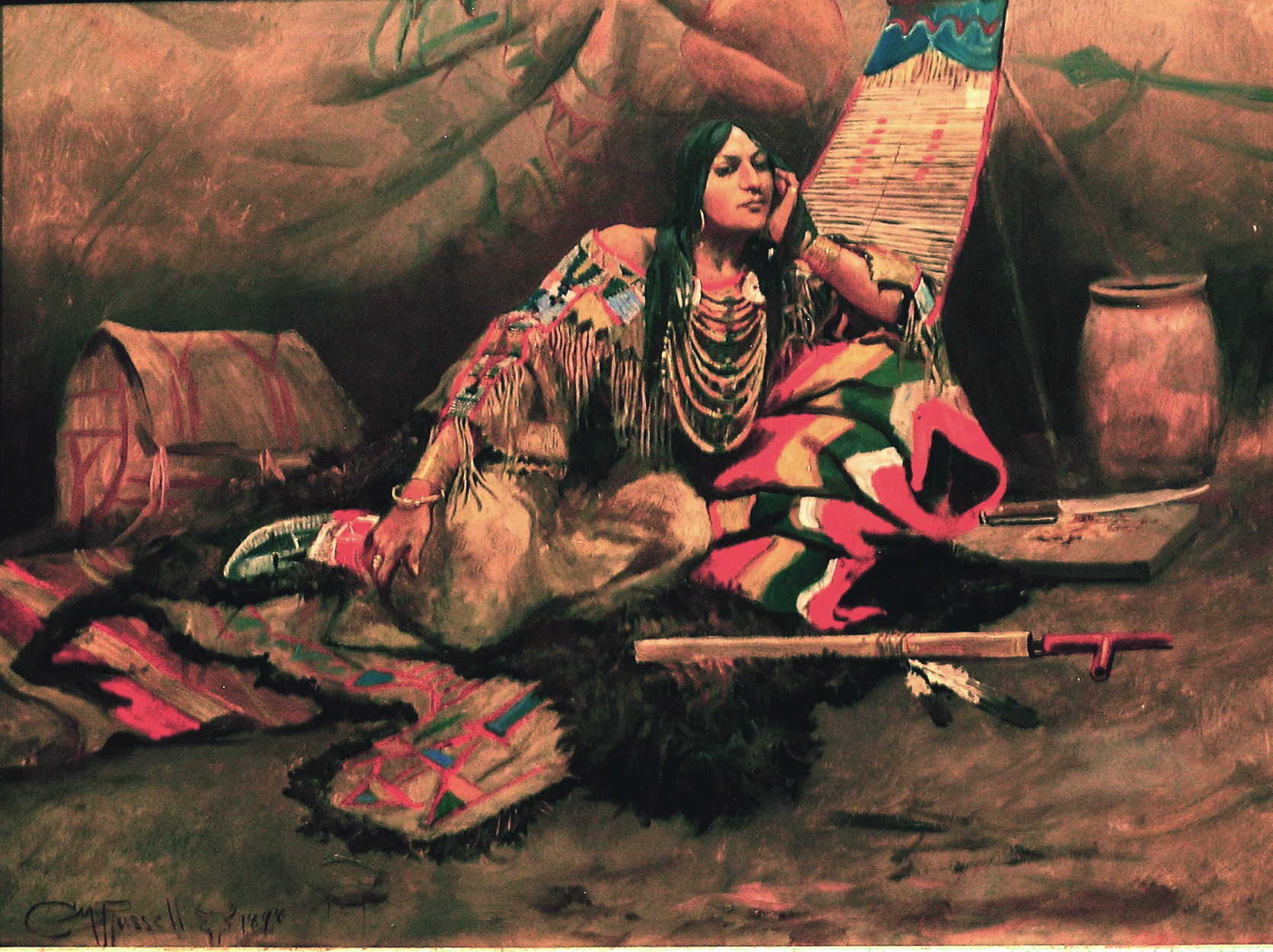
Keeoma #3, one of five "Keeoma" paintings of sensual Native women (body model was his wife Nancy)

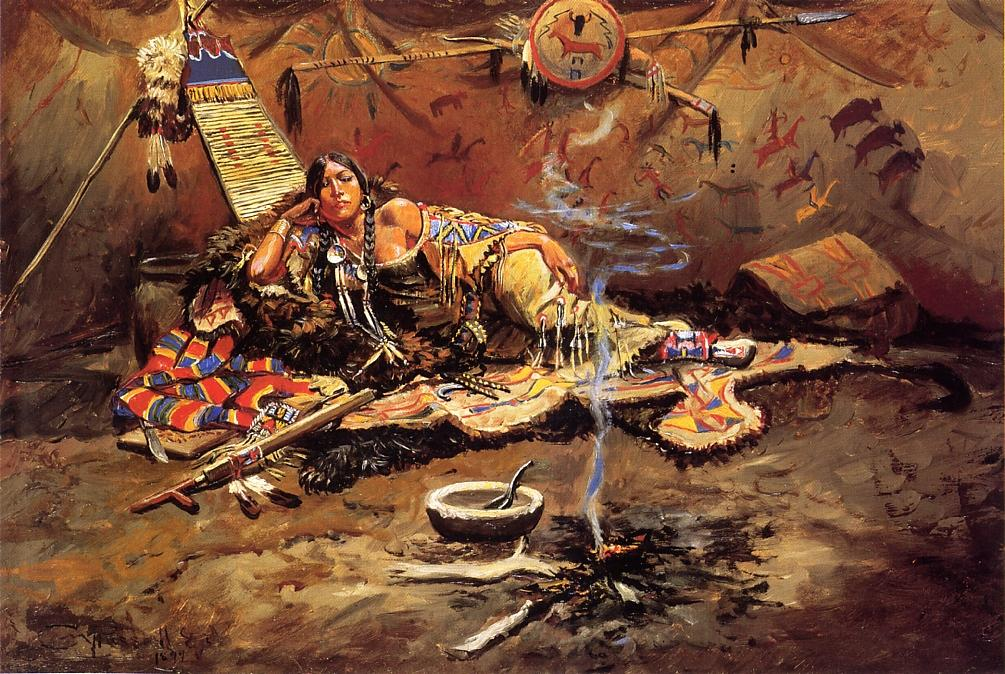
Waiting and Mad, not an official "Keeoma" painting, but sometimes considered part of the series

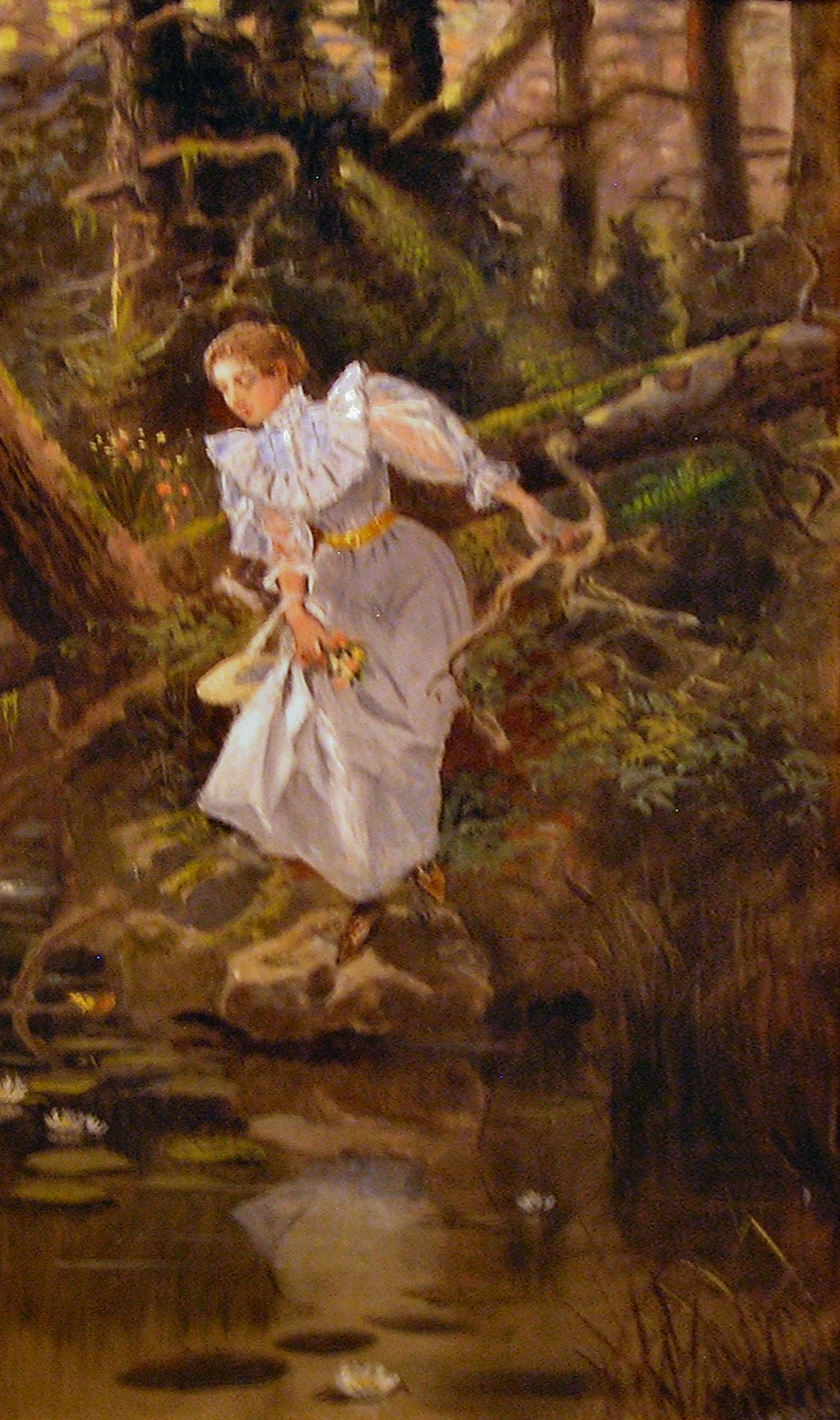
Lolly, showing a young Victorian woman

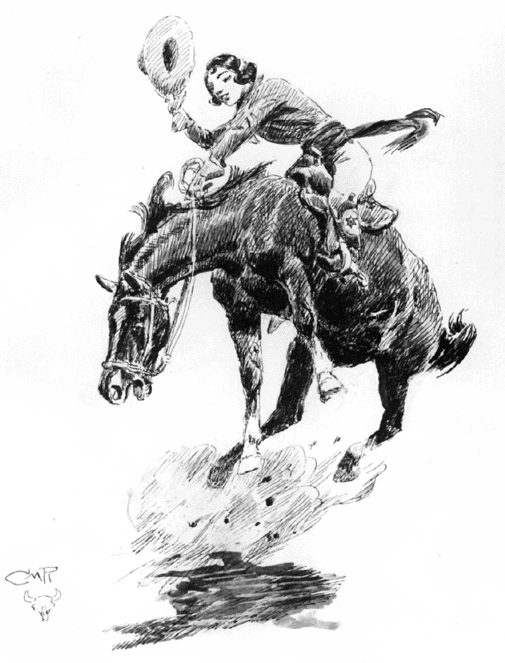
Rodeo cowgirl

=== Other ===
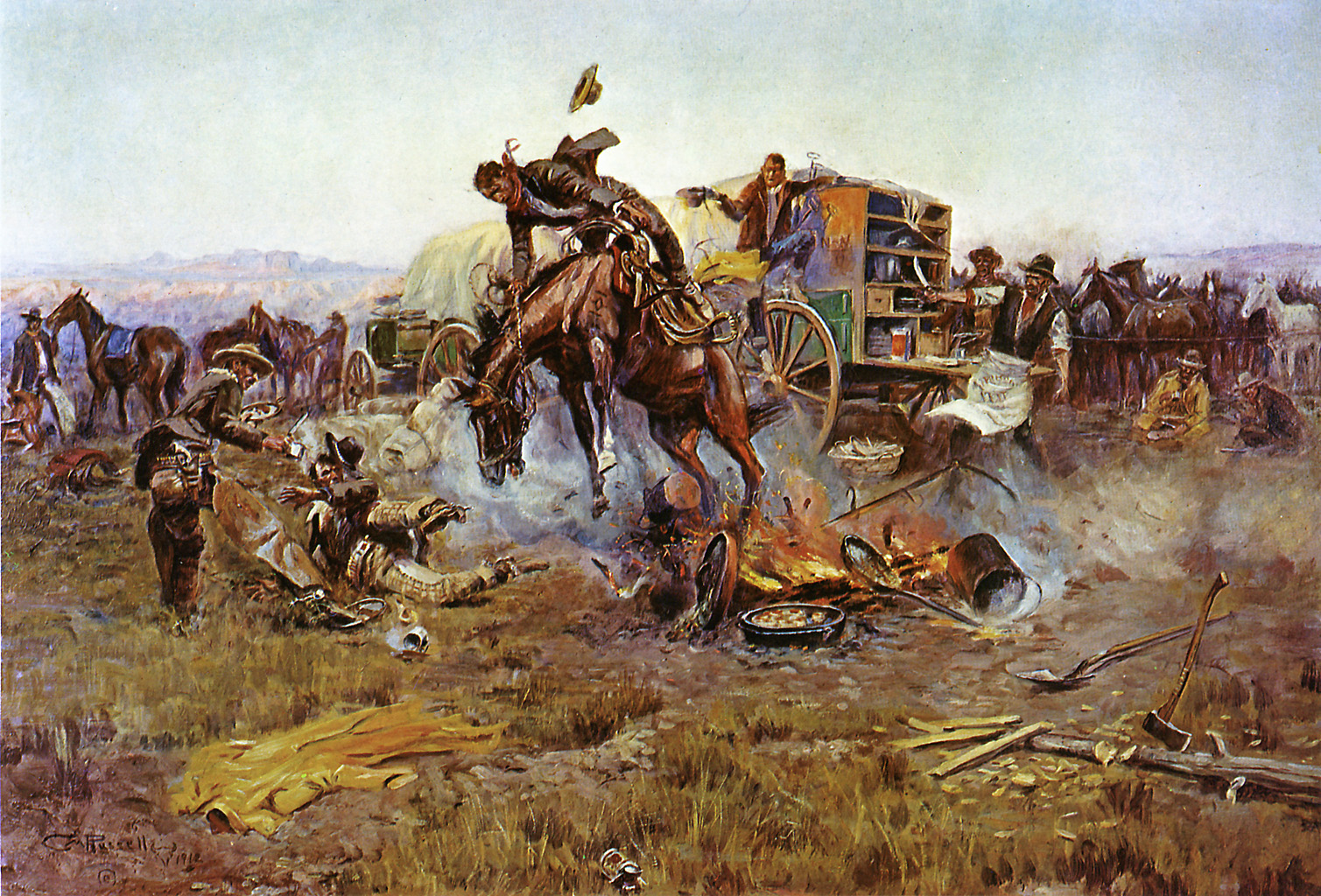
Camp Cook's Troubles

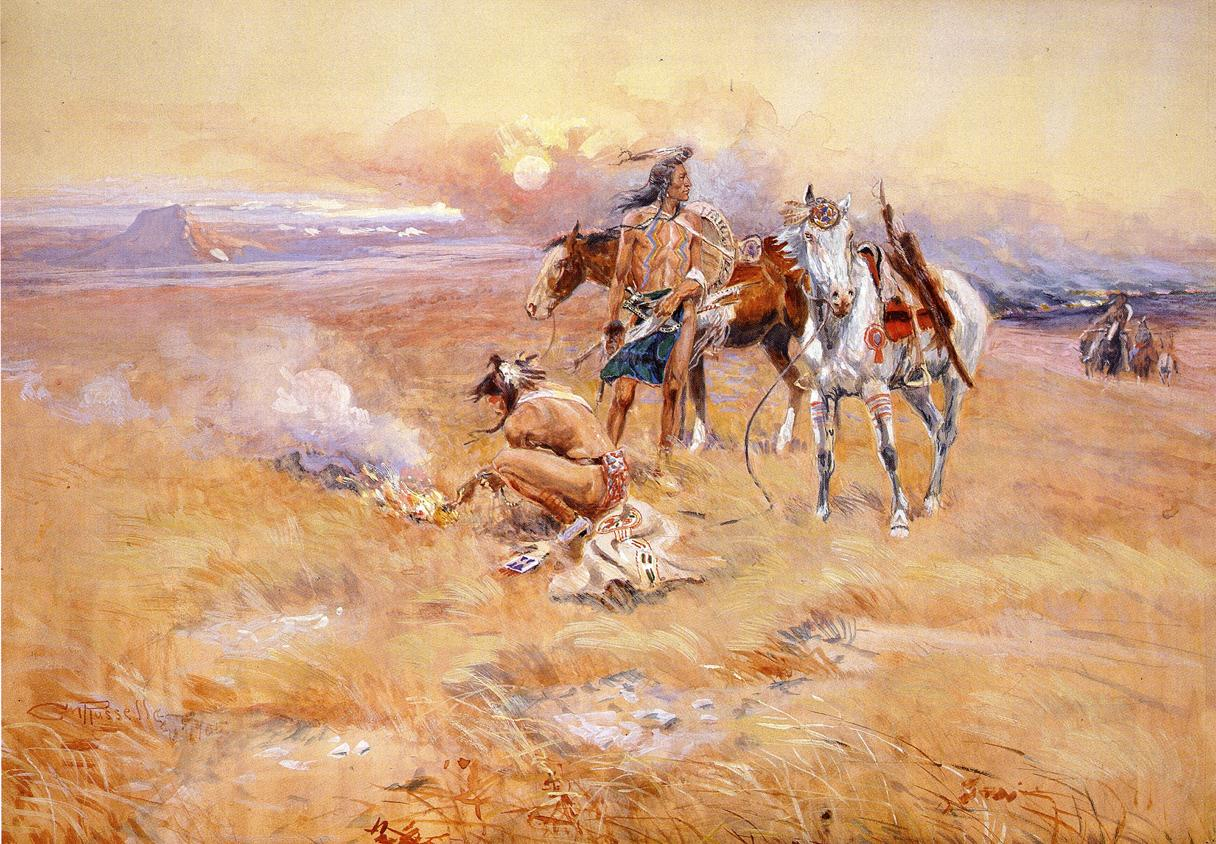
Burning Crow Buffalo Range

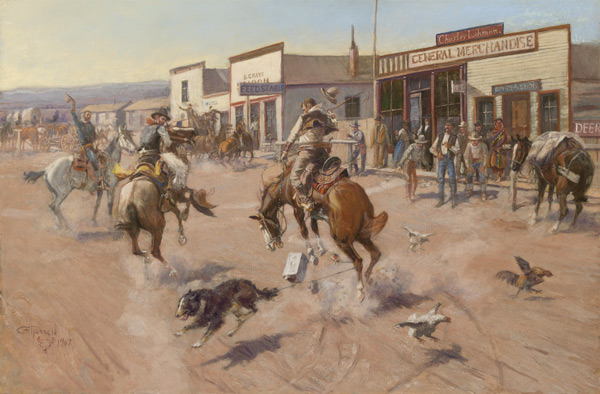
Utica (A Quiet day in Utica), 1907

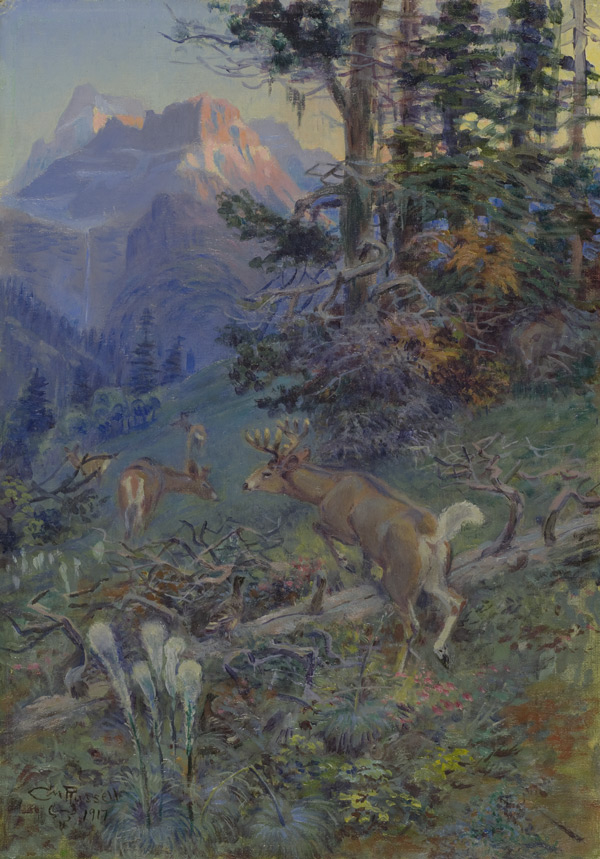
Deer in Forest (White Tailed Deer), 1917, Oil on canvasboard
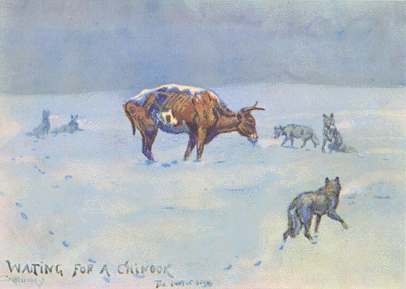
Waiting for a Chinook, also known as Last of the 5000. One of several depictions of the winter of 1886–87

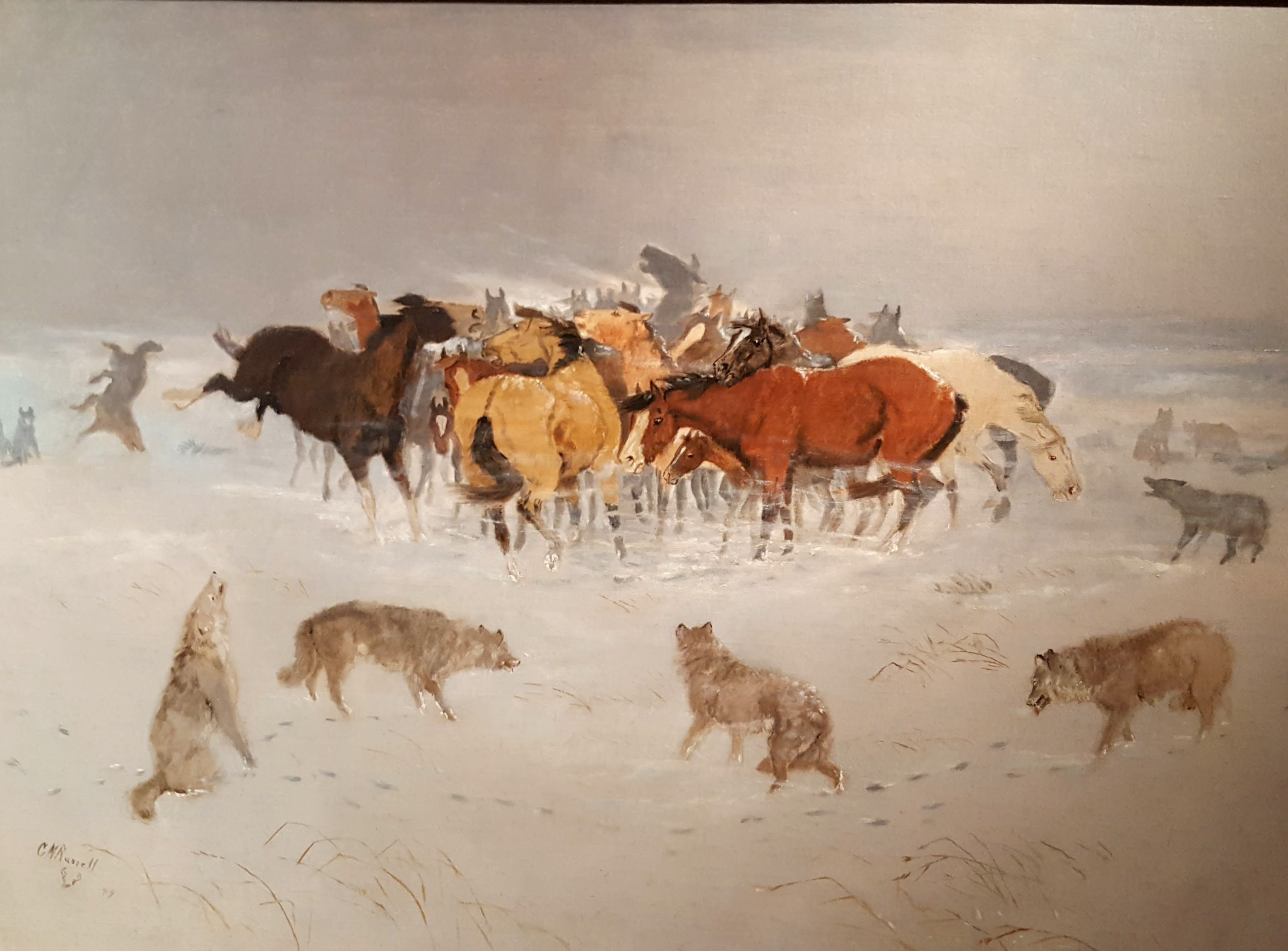
Flying hoofs, 1894

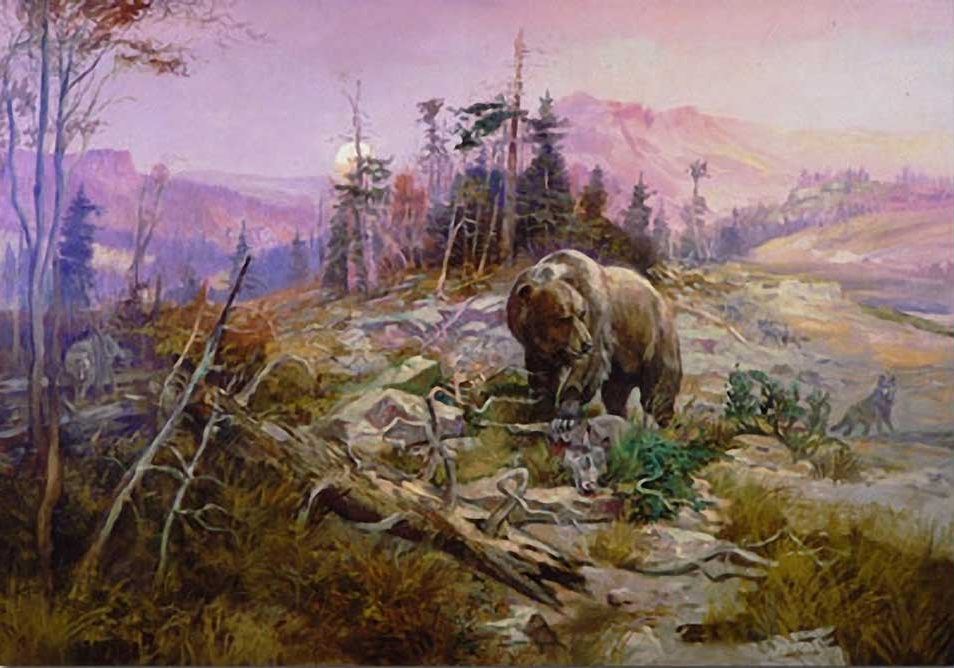
To The Victor Belongs The Spoils

=== Historical events ===
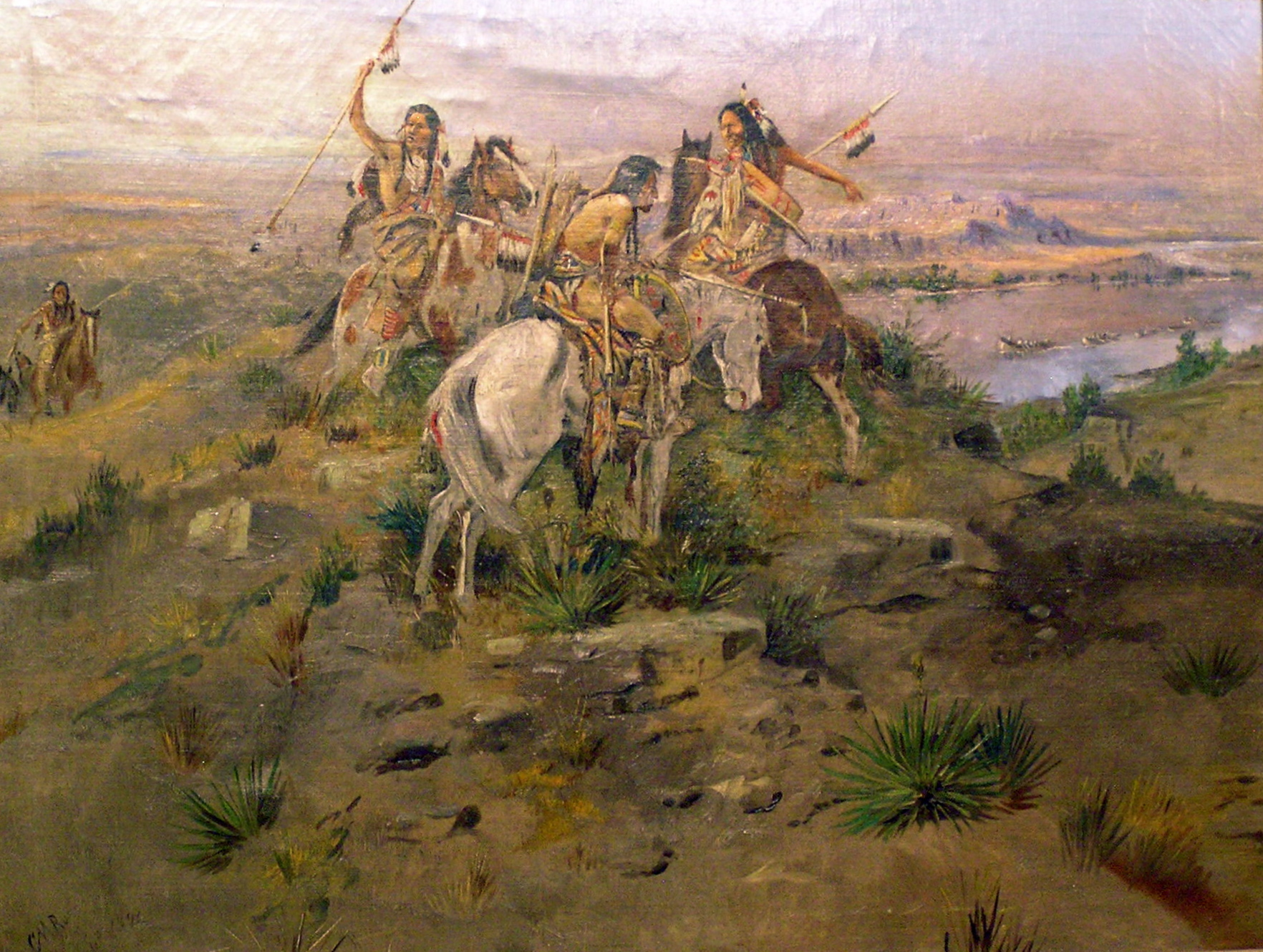
The Indians discovering Lewis and Clark. Russell depicted various stages of the Lewis and Clark Expedition in a number of works.

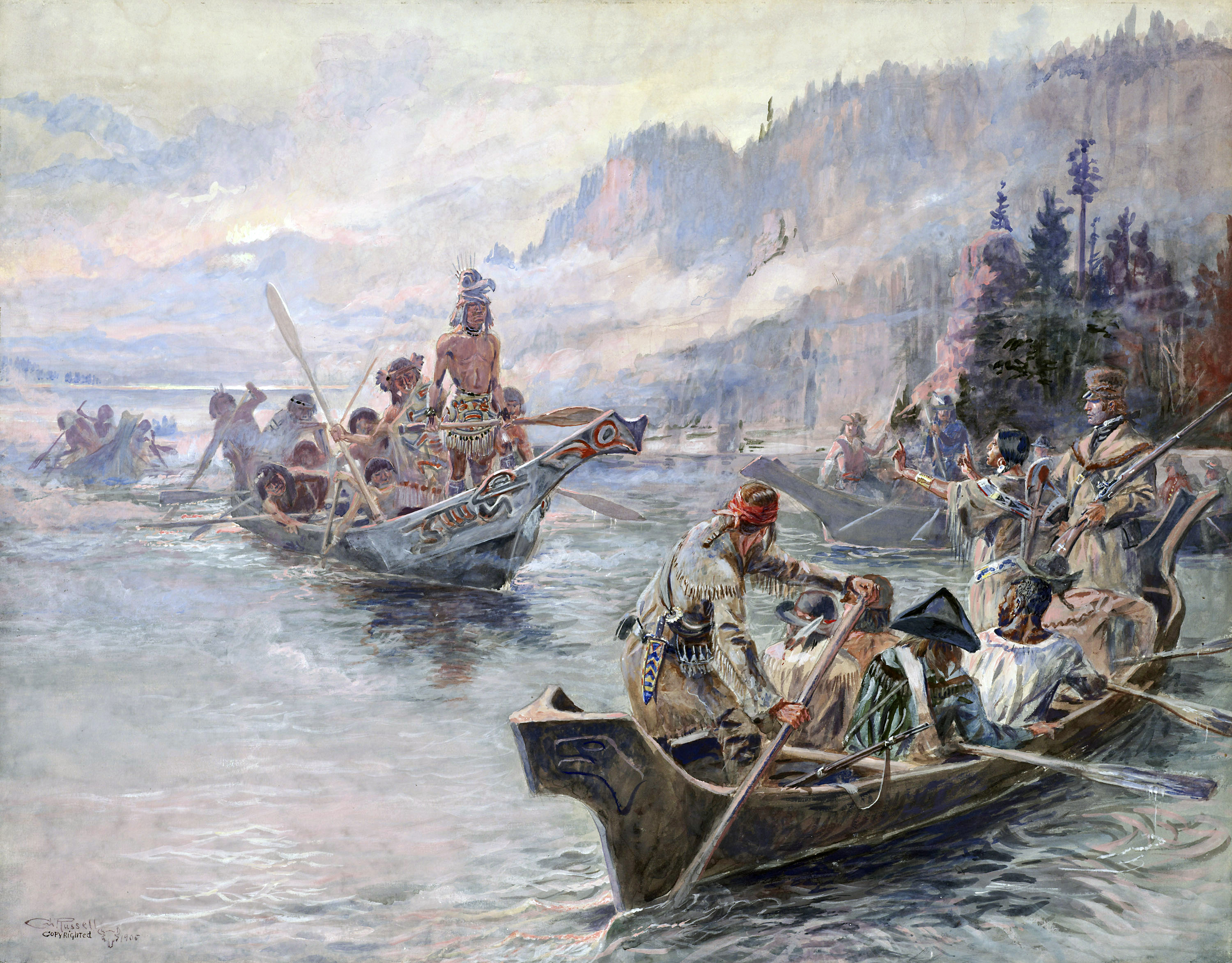
Lewis and Clark on the Lower Columbia.

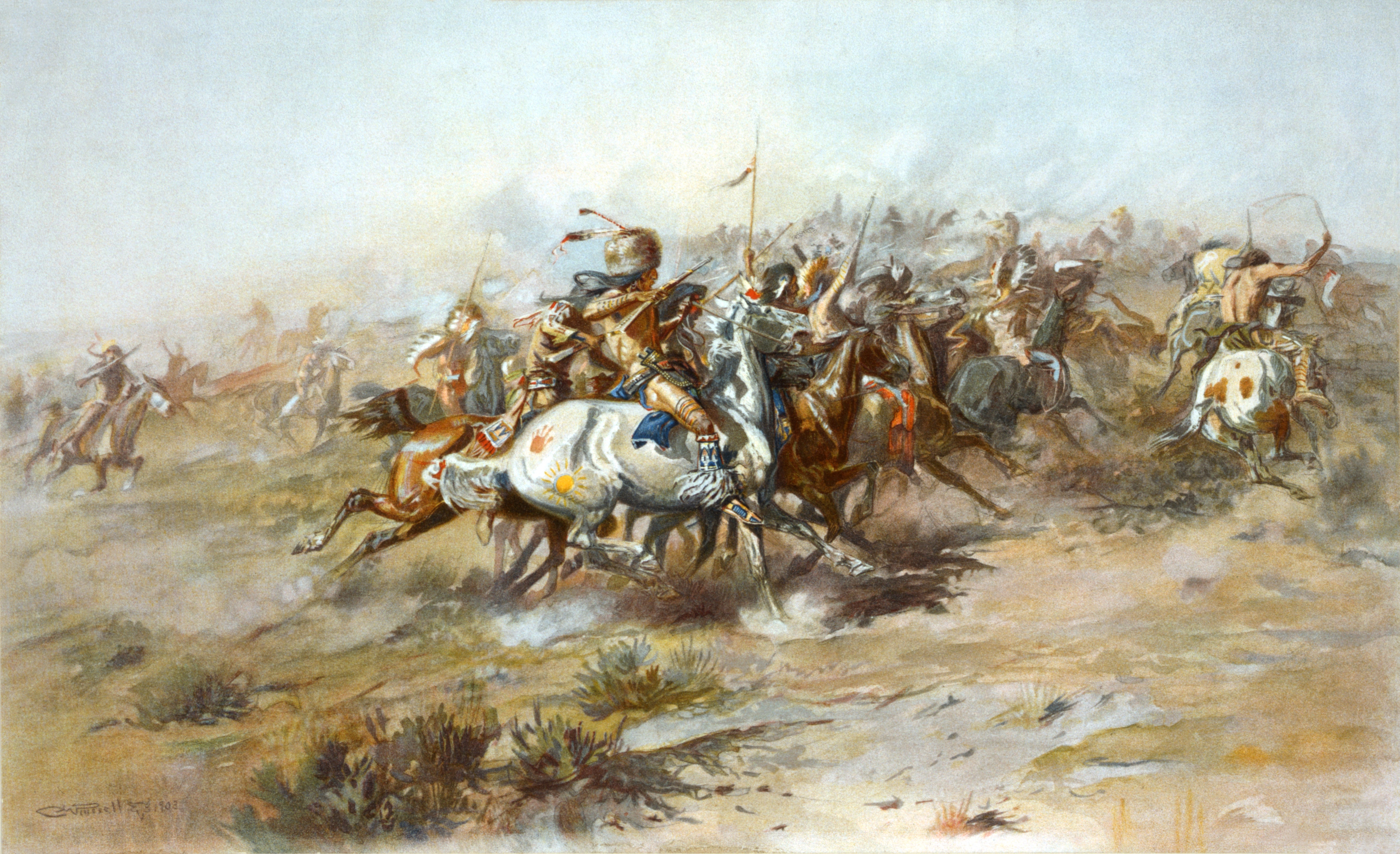
The Custer Fight (lithograph, 1903). Depicts the Battle of the Little Bighorn from the point of view of the Native American combatants.

== See also ==
- Earl W. Bascom, cowboy artist/sculptor influenced by and related to Charlie Russell
- Charles Beil, cowboy sculptor and protégé of Russell
- Harold Dow Bugbee, Western artist influenced by Russell
- Dan Muller, cowboy artist influenced by C M Russell
- J. K. Ralston, western artist
- Frederic Remington, western artist
