= Charles Beil =

Canadian artist

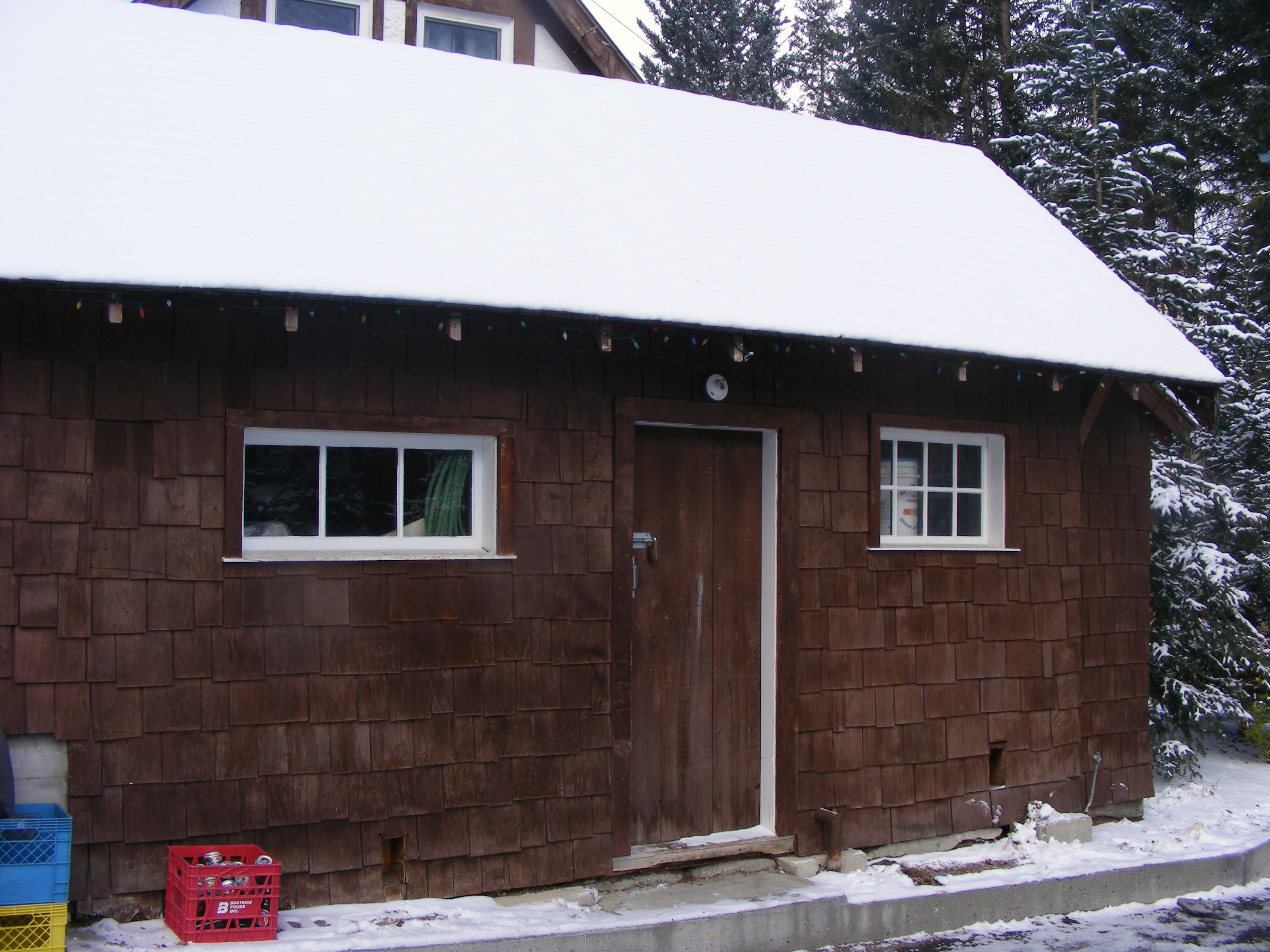
- Beil's workshop at 119 Cave Avenue, Banff
- Born: Charles Alois Beil; April 10, 1894; Black Forest, Germany
- Died: July 29, 1976 (aged 82); Banff, Alberta, Canada
- Known for: Sculptor
- Spouse: Olive Luxton

Charles A. Beil CM LL. D. (1894 – July 29, 1976) was a Canadian sculptor best known for his sculptures of cowboys and the plain Indians of the early West. He was a protégé and friend of artist Charles Marion Russell. He was born in Germany and left at the age of 11. He worked for some time in South America before making his way to North America, where he discovered his love of the Wild West and the Frontier. It was Russell who encouraged him to start creating art, and inspired him to start working with pencil and clay. Beil moved to Banff, Alberta, in the 1930s, where he began to take an interest in casting clay into bronze.

His studio was established on Bear Street in Banff above a bakery, and it was there that Beil continued to further his reputation as a Western artist. In fact, his main form of work was to create trophies for the Calgary Stampede, which he did for over 20 years. In 1940, he married a Banff girl by the name Olive Luxton, the niece of famed Banff businessman Norman Luxton, and they moved into a house on Cave Avenue in Banff. Together they had three children; Charles, Lois, and Carol.

Charlie Beil was a recipient of many honours and awards over the years, including being made a Member of the Order of Canada in 1973. He also received the Canada Medal, an Honorary Doctorate from the University of Calgary (1968), the Alberta Achievement Award in 1974. He was also made an Honorary Associate Director of the Calgary Exhibition and Stampede and an Honorary Member of the Cowboy Artists of America.

== Art ==
Charlie Beil's main form of work was with bronze casting, but the artist was well-versed in watercolour, oil, pen and ink, and etchings as well. He cast not only bronze statues, but also sculpted in clay, did woodcarving, and cast in cement. His art focused on the theme of Western life, such as packhorses, First Nations, and cowboys.

Today, his work sits scattered in various museums and galleries across the globe. He has murals in the Stampede offices in Calgary, the Luxton Museum in Banff, and a statue even sits in the entrance of Buckingham Palace. As well, the many trophies he created throughout his lifetime sit on the mantels of many North Americans to date.
