= Canadian pipers in World War I =

Soldiers who played bagpipes

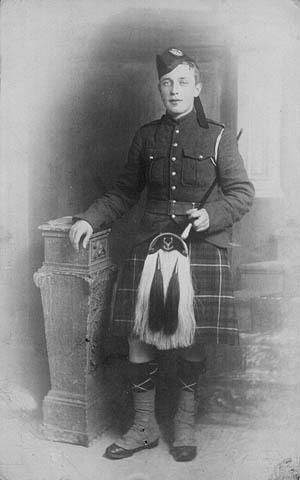
James Cleland Richardson, the only Canadian piper to have been awarded a Victoria Cross

Canadian pipers in World War I were soldiers who contributed to the First World War by playing the bagpipes as they marched the troops to the front. These men were often members of a pipe band, that chose to enlist at the outbreak of World War I to assist with the Canadian war effort. Although most of the pipers were trained to fight, many of them played the bagpipes throughout the war as a way to encourage the troops as they walked into battle.

== Background ==
The use of bagpipes in wars is believed to have originated from the Battle of Culloden whereby Scottish Pipers would play war tunes while marching their troops into battle. Since the Highland Regiment never went to battle without a piper, the bagpipes in turn become known as both an instrument and a weapon of war. The Great Highland bagpipe, which is native to Scotland and was used in the Battle of Culloden, is the type of bagpipe that the Canadian pipe bands played during World War I. After the defeat of the Jacobite army at the Battle of Culloden in 1746, the British sought to suppress highland culture in a bid to quell nationalism in Scotland. The unification of Scotland and England had only taken place in 1707 and the Jacobite rebellions of the first half of the 18th century clearly highlighted the union’s fragility. A ban on highland culture and tradition, including the bagpipes and the wearing of tartan, was an attempt to eliminate any Scottish sentiments of independence which found its strongest support in the highlands. As a result, many Scots immigrated to Canada bringing along their culture and traditions. During the Seven Years' War and the American Revolution, the British Army employed Scottish pipers with its Highland regiments to fight alongside the Canadian militia.

== History ==
At the outbreak of World War I, many Scottish-Canadians felt a sense of duty of enlist in the war. Various battalions of the Canadian Expeditionary Force, such as the 16th Battalion, the 13th Battalion (Royal Highlanders of Canada), CEF, the 15th Battalion (48th Highlanders of Canada), CEF, the 107th Battalion (Winnipeg), CEF, the 1st Battalion, Canadian Mounted Rifles, CEF, the 224th Battalion, CEF, the 208th Battalion (Canadian Irish), CEF, the Princess Patricia's Canadian Light Infantry, and the Canadian Railway Troops, employed pipers from all across Canada, except Prince Edward Island, to fight in the war. The purpose of having pipers play for the troops as they marched into battle was to encourage the troops to march on and face the enemy with courage. The sound of the bagpipes often lifted the spirit of the pipers fellow comrades and drowned out the sounds of the battle. The use of pipers in the First World War was often criticized due to the belief that the sound of the bagpipes would not be heard during the battles, and that the pipers were too vulnerable since they did not have a weapon to defend themselves with against the enemy fire. The commanding officer in several battalions would allow pipers to march to and from the front, but they did not allow them to play during the battles as there were too many piper casualties. The pipers who did play during the battles were faced with gas attacks and constant gunfire by enemy troops. For this reason, pipers were assigned other duties such as, stretcher-bearers and supply runners.

=== 16th Battalion ===
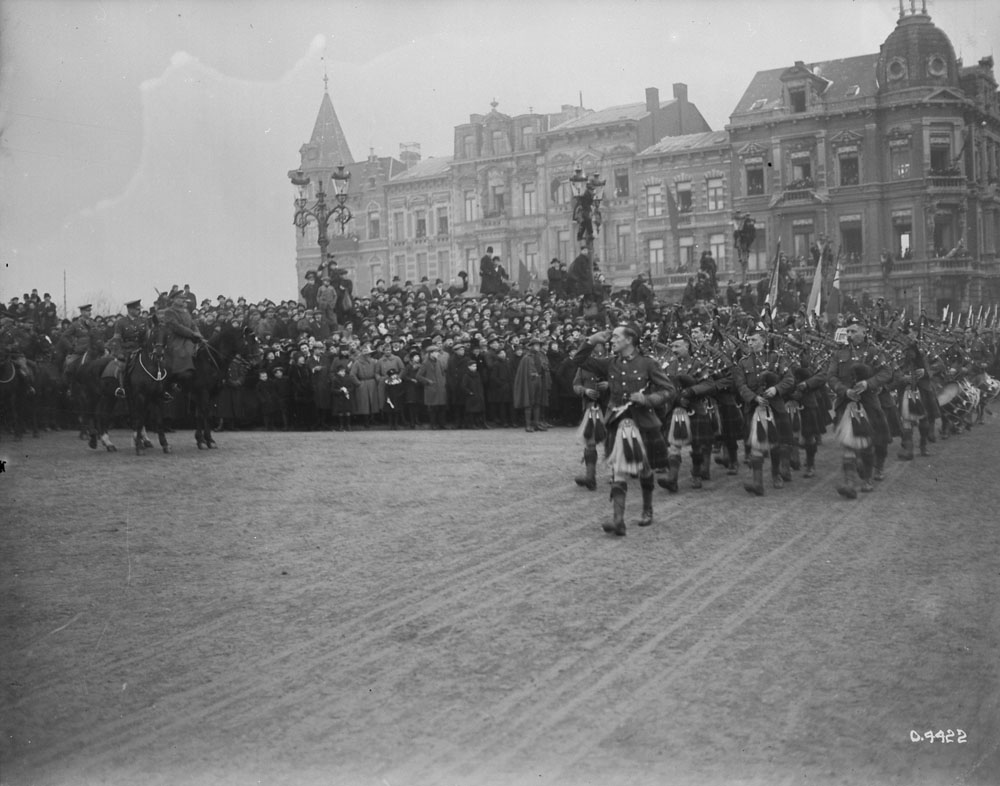
The 16th Battalion (Canadian Scottish) march past during a review of the 1st Canadian Division, February 1919. The unit's pipers are visible at the front of the column.

Canadian Regiments in World War I often had a pipe band also known as Canadian military bands. The most well known Canadian pipe band during World War I played alongside the 16th Battalion (Canadian Scottish), CEF. The 16th Battalion was formed in September 1914, shortly after Canada entered the First World War. After the enlistment process began, the 16th Battalion called for an entire pipe band to escort them in the war. After arriving on the front, and throughout the war, the 16th Battalion rarely fought without the Canadian pipers. During the war, many of the 16th Battalion pipers served as runners who brought orders, rations, and ammunition to the front, while others acted as stretcher-bearers responsible for bringing wounded troops to the rear. Although some pipers were permitted to play during the battles, most would play while the troops marched to the front, and during the ceremonies that were held between battles. For the first part of the war, the tune "Scotland is my ain Hame" was used during the marches, which was later changed to "All the Blue Bonnets are O'er the Border." In total, the 16th Battalion had thirty pipers enlist during the First World War.

== Notable pipers ==
During the Second Battle of Ypres in April 1915, pipers James Thomson and William McIvor of the 16th Battalion died of wounds they received following a German gas attack. A month later, pipers George Birnie and Augus Morrison of the 16th Battalion died from enemy fire. In 1917, piper John Park of the 16th Battalion was killed. In August 1918, piper George Paul, who later received a Military Medal was killed while playing the bagpipes atop a tank in Amiens. Piper Alec McGillivray of the 16th Battalion, who also received a Military Medal, was killed by a shell burst. In September 1918, Pipe Major James Groat was awarded the Distinguished Conduct Medal for playing his colonel (Cyrus Peck VC) into action. Pipers Walter Teller and W. Brand of the 25th Battalion (Nova Scotia Rifles), CEF were both awarded Military Medals for playing the bagpipes during the Battle of Vimy Ridge. Other pipers were awarded medals for their bravery during the war including Corporal William Curries and piper Hugh Mackenzie of the 21st Battalion. Each battalion suffered piper casualties, with the total number of casualties of pipers during the war is estimated to be over one thousand, five-hundred of which were fatal.

=== James Cleland Richardson ===
Canada's famous piper James Cleland Richardson and his family immigrated to Canada from Scotland in 1913, and when war broke out in 1914, James enlisted as a piper with the 16th Battalion. Richardson was involved in the Capture of Regina Trench, during the Battle of Somme, where he volunteered to pipe his troops through the battle. During the attack, Richardson was ordered to take care of a wounded comrade and some prisoners, forcing him to leave behind his bagpipes. Upon returning to retrieve the bagpipes, Richardson was killed. On October 22, 1918, James Richardson became the only Canadian piper to be awarded the Victoria Cross for his bravery and action at Regina Trench. In 2006, it was reported by the Canadian Broadcasting Corporation, that the bagpipes of James Richardson had been returned to Canada eighty years after Richardson initially lost them on the battlefield.

== See also ==
- Canadian-Scottish regiment
- History of the Canadian Army
- Military history of Canada during World War I
