= James Cleland Richardson =

Scottish-born Canadian recipient of the Victoria Cross (1895-1916)

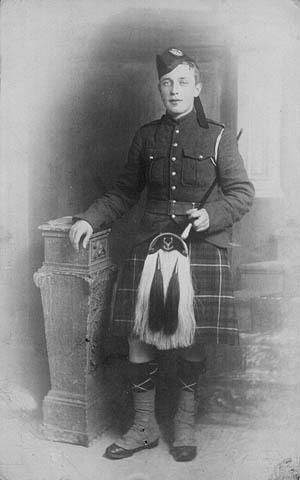
- Piper James C. Richardson, VC, circa. 1914-15
- Born: 25 November 1895; Bellshill, Scotland
- Died: 9 October 1916 (aged 20); Ancre Heights, Somme, France
- Burial place: Adanac Military Cemetery
- Military career
- Allegiance: Canada
- Branch: Canadian Expeditionary Force
- Service years: 1914 - 1916
- Rank: Piper
- Nickname: Jimmy
- Units: 16th (Canadian Scottish) Battalion, CEF
- Conflicts: First World War: Battle of the Somme; Battle of the Ancre Heights †
- Awards: Victoria Cross

James Cleland Richardson VC (25 November 1895 – 8/9 October 1916) was a Scottish-born Canadian recipient of the Victoria Cross, the highest and most prestigious award for gallantry in the face of the enemy that can be awarded to British and Commonwealth forces.

== Youth, pre-war life, and enlistment ==
James Cleland Richardson was born in Bellshill, Scotland on 25 November 1895 and was one of seven children. His father, David, was a police officer and his mother Mary was a mill worker. At the time of the 1901 UK census the family was living at the police station houses in Blantyre, South Lanarkshire where his father was police sergeant and at the 1911 census, they were based at nearby Rutherglen where his father had risen to the rank of Police Inspector and Fire Chief. As the family moved, James (known as Jimmy) attended school at Bellshill Academy, Auchinraith Public School at Blantyre and John Street School, Bridgeton, Glasgow. He was also a member of the Boy Scouts in Rutherglen. During these years, he learned to play the bagpipes and won several prizes.

Sources vary, but somewhere between 1911 and 1913, when James would have been between 16 and 18 years old, the Richardsons emigrated to Canada, first settling in Vancouver and then Chilliwack, British Columbia, where his father became Chief of Police. James took up work as an apprentice electrician in a factory in the False Creek area of Vancouver. In a precursor of the valour he would later show on the Somme, while at work in 1914 he learned of a youth drowning in a nearby creek and proceeded to run to the scene, dive into the water and bring up the boy, who died despite Richardson's efforts.

In Vancouver, James joined the cadet corps of the 72nd Seaforth Highlanders of Canada and became a Piper in the regiment's famous pipe band. At the outbreak of World War I, he voluntarily enlisted and was taken on strength on 23 September 1914 as a private/piper with the Seaforths. His regiment contributed a large draught to 16th (Canadian Scottish) Battalion and were among the first echelons of the Canadian Expeditionary Force sent overseas on October 3, 1914, and after further training in England, the 1st Canadian Division were sent to France on 9 February 1915.

== 1915 war service ==
In April 1915, the 1st Canadian Division were placed in a reserve position behind the frontlines near the Belgian city of Ypres as the German Army unleashed a series of poison gas attacks that began the Second Battle of Ypres. On the night of April 22, the opening day of the battle, Richardson's 16th, along with the 10th Battalion were moved into the front lines and ordered to counterattack and advance into a position known as Kitcheners' Wood in the dark of night.

In what became known as the Battle of Kitcheners' Wood, Richardson set out among a group of 50 men who began digging in under enemy fire after advancing about 30 metres. James however continued the advance and discovered a farmhouse in and around which a group of German soldiers had taken cover. In doing so, he was spotted by a German officer who was leading the group and shot him before returning to the position his unit was digging out. There he explained what he had seen to a Sergeant Major, who sent the information back to officers behind the lines who then directed artillery onto the position.

== Fighting at the Somme, earning the Victoria Cross, death ==
In 1916, the 1st Canadian Division were involved in fighting several episodes of the Battle of the Somme. On 8 October 1916, in a phase of the action known as the Battle of the Ancre Heights Richardson's battalion was pinned down by barbed wire barriers and intense enemy fire during an attack on Regina Trench. The 20-year-old fearlessly encouraged his comrades forward by marching in front of them, playing his bagpipes in the face of the withering enemy fire, inspiring them to get up and continue their attack, which was ultimately successful. Later in the day, James realized he had left his bagpipes at or near the front lines and decided to traverse the battlefield to recover them, however, Richardson never returned and was presumed to have been killed.

For his actions, he was awarded the British Empire's highest medal for bravery and valour, the Victoria Cross. The citation given for the awarding of the Victoria Cross, as published in the London Gazette No. 30967, dated 18 October 1918, stated the following:

For most conspicuous bravery and devotion to duty when, prior to attack, he obtained permission from his Commanding Officer to play his company "over the top".
As the Company approached the objective, it was held up by very strong wire and came under intense fire, which caused heavy casualties and demoralised the formation for the moment. Realising the situation, Piper Richardson strode up and down outside the wire, playing his pipes with the greatest coolness. The effect was instantaneous. Inspired by his splendid example, the company rushed the wire with such fury and determination that the obstacle was overcome and the position captured.
Later, after participating in bombing operations, he was detailed to take back a wounded comrade and prisoners.
After proceeding about 200 yards, Piper Richardson remembered that he had left his pipes behind. Although strongly urged not to do so, he insisted on returning to recover his pipes. He has never been seen since, and death has been presumed accordingly owing to lapse of time.

== Richardson's bagpipes ==
External videos
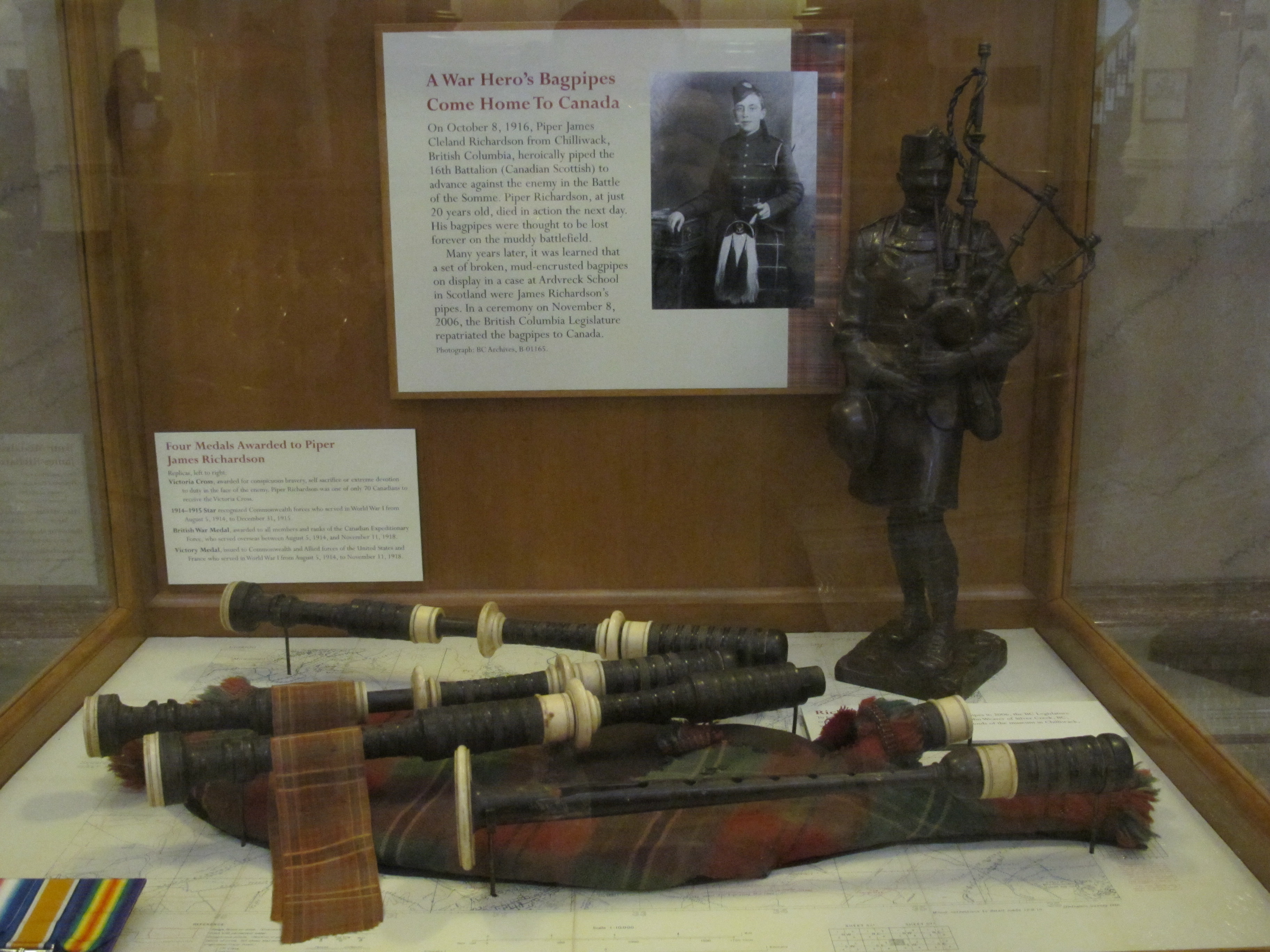
- Richardson's bagpipes
- CANADIAN SCOTTISH REGIMENT, Liza Dawson-Whisker and Matt Mathiason as part of ACP, Camosun College

Richardson's bagpipes were believed to have been lost in the mud of the Somme for almost 90 years until 2002, when the Pipe Major of The Canadian Scottish Regiment (Princess Mary's) responded to an Internet posting. He discovered that Ardvreck preparatory school in Crieff (Perthshire, Scotland) had possession of a set of bagpipes with the unique Lennox tartan on them, the same tartan used by the pipers of the 16th (Canadian Scottish) Battalion.

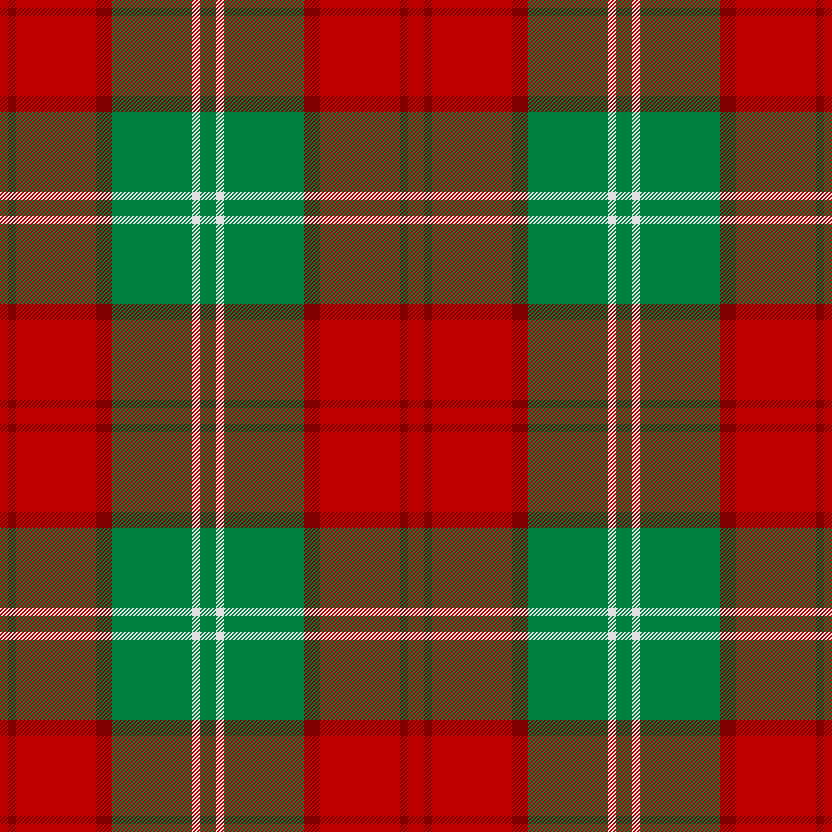
Lennox tartan

A British Army Chaplain, Major Edward Yeld Bate, had found the pipes in 1917 and brought them back home after the war to a school in Scotland where he was a teacher. The pipes were unidentified for several decades, and served as a broken, mud-caked, and blood-stained reminder of an unknown piper from the Great War.

Andrew Winstanley of The Canadian Club and Pipe Major Roger McGuire were largely responsible for the investigative work into identifying Richardson's pipes. With the support of The Canadian Club and a group of patriotic citizens, Pipe Major McGuire travelled to Scotland in January 2003 to help identify the pipes that had been displayed at Ardvreck School for over seven decades. Tomas Christie, a parent of students there and also a piper, initiated the search for the origin of the pipes.

Their collective effort led to conclusive evidence that identified the pipes as those played by Piper Richardson on that day in 1916. An anonymous donor facilitated the purchase of the pipes on behalf of the citizens of Canada. In October 2006, a party of dignitaries visited Scotland and received the pipes from the Headmaster of Ardvreck School for repatriation to Canada.

On 8 November 2006, the bagpipes were officially repatriated when troops from The Canadian Scottish Regiment (Princess Mary's) placed them at the British Columbia Legislature as a reminder of a generation's valour. They are currently on public display.

== Burial and memorial ==
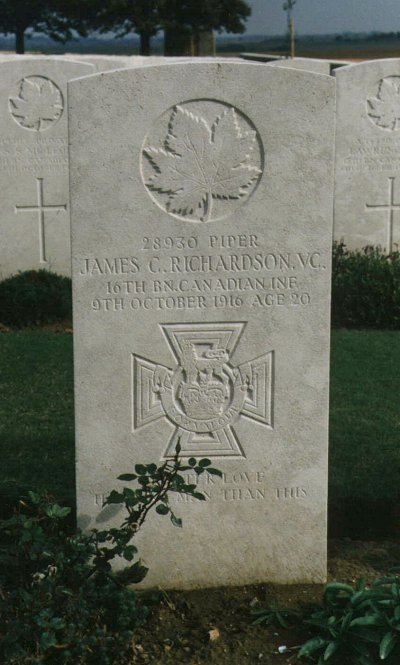
Richardson's headstone

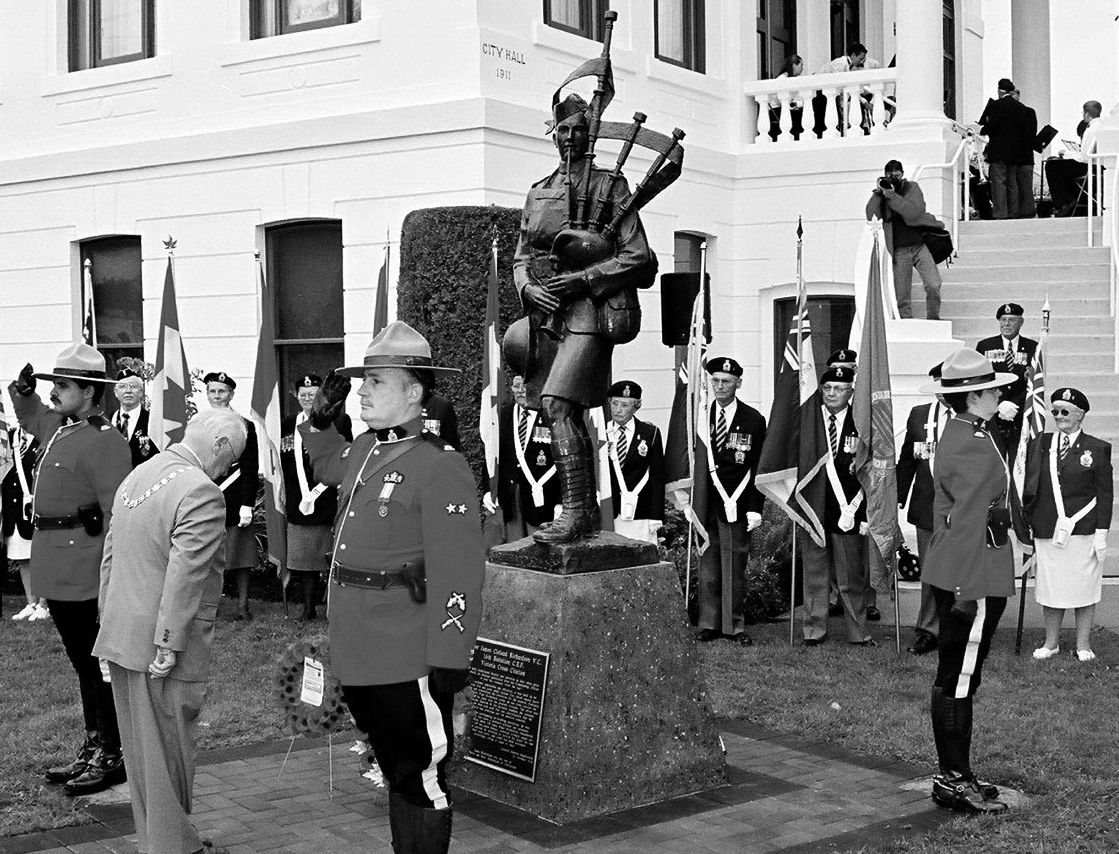
The 2003 statue ceremony in front of the Chilliwack Museum and Historical Society

After the war, in June 1920, James Richardson's body was discovered by a farmer about 300 metres north of the northeast corner of Le Sars village and recovered for burial. He is interred at Adanac Military Cemetery (Plot III, Row F, Grave 36) which is located on the east side of the D107 Road, 1.6 kilometres north of the village of Courcelette, France. The battlefield where he earned the Victoria Cross is situated roughly one kilometre east of the back wall of the cemetery, and can be seen on a clear day.

Sculptor John Weaver was commissioned to produce a statue of Richardson, which has been display at the Chilliwack Museum and Archives in Chilliwack since 2003.

Richardson is also commemorated with an inscribed paving stone in Bellshill, Scotland, the town he was born in.

Richardson's Victoria Cross and war medals are on display at the Canadian War Museum in Ottawa, Canada.

== See also ==
- Canadian pipers in World War I
