= John Weaver (artist) =

American sculptor

John Barney Weaver
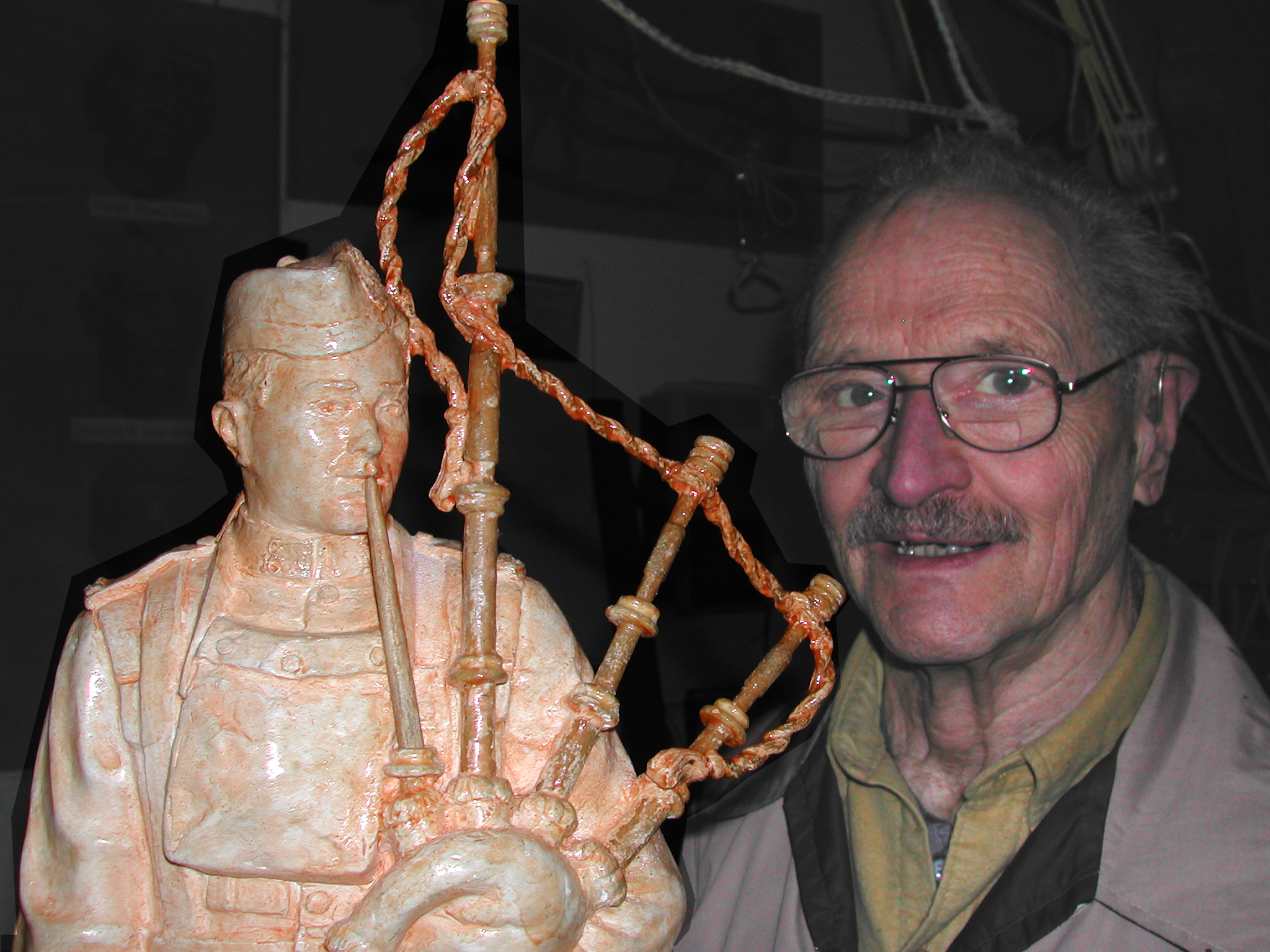
- John Weaver with a Piper Richardson statue model, circa 2003
- Born: March 28, 1920; Anaconda, Montana
- Died: April 10, 2012 (aged 92); Silver Creek, BC
- Education: School of the Art Institute of Chicago
- Known for: Sculptor
- Notable work: Statue of Charles Marion Russell, in the National Statuary Hall Collection; Wayne Gretzky statue in Edmonton "The Bullwacker" in Helena, Montana
- Awards: Doctorate of Laws, Honoris Causa, University of Alberta, 1984. Alberta Achievement Award, 1977; Rotary Club Blue Ribbon, Clay Modeling, 1929–1931
- Patrons: State of Montana; City of Edmonton; Helena Civic Center Board
- Website: http://johnweaversculptor.com

John Barney Weaver (March 28, 1920 – April 10, 2012) was an American sculptor from Anaconda, Montana. He was known for creating a statue of Charles Marion Russell at the National Statuary Hall Collection, and three busts of Chester W. Nimitz for the United States Navy.

== Biography ==
John Barney Weaver was born on March 28, 1920, in Anaconda, Montana. He trained under his father, John Bruce "Pop" Weaver, a painter and sculptor. He has a son named Henry, and a daughter named Sara.

== Career ==
Weaver graduated from the School of the Art Institute of Chicago in 1946, where he studied with Albin Polasek and Emil Zettler. He received a teaching position in sculpture and figure drawing at the Layton School of Art in Milwaukee where he taught from 1946 to 1951. He was a curator for the Montana Historical Society for five years. He worked as a Natural History Sculptor for the Smithsonian Institution for six years. In 1966, he started working with the Alberta Provincial Museum prior to its opening on December 6, 1967. He became a Canadian citizen in 1973. Weaver died of a heart attack at the age of 92 on April 12, 2013, at his home of many years in Silver Creek, BC. "In bronze his zest for fine art and human achievement can endure for millennia; in our hearts his strength and loving care will endure forever."

== Notable works ==
Weaver created over 2000 works in his lifetime.

=== Canada ===
- The Stake, Royal Alberta Museum, Edmonton, 1967
- Pronghorn Antelopes, Royal Alberta Museum, Edmonton, 1970
- The Frieze, Royal Alberta Museum, Edmonton, 1971
- Edmonton Traders, south side of Stanley A. Milner Library, 1971
- Deerfoot, Deerfoot Mall, Calgary, 1982
- Arthur Henry Griesbach, Northlands Coliseum entrance to the LRT station, Edmonton, 1982
- The Speed Skater, Olympic Oval, Calgary, 1984
- Wayne Gretzky, Rogers Place, Edmonton, 1989.
- The Merchant, outside Sun Life Place, Edmonton, 1989
- Victoria Pacifica, Songhees Walkway, Victoria, 1990.
- Madonna of the Wheat, outside Edmonton City Hall, 2000
- Robbie Burns, Oliver Park, across from Hotel Macdonald, Edmonton, 2000
- Piper Richardson, in front of Chilliwack Museum, 2003. (Weaver's last public monument)
- Stampede Rescue, unfinished, to be completed by his son.

=== United States ===
- World War II Jungle Fighter, Butte, Montana, 1944.
- Bust of Sam W. Mitchell, Montana Secretary of State, 1933–1955, Montana State Capitol
- Charles Marion Russell, a Montana contribution to the National Statuary Hall Collection, 1958.
- Jacqueline Kennedy, Lady Bird Johnson, Smithsonian Institution, Washington, D.C., 1962–64
- Three busts of Chester W. Nimitz purchased in 1965. Presently located at the United States Naval Academy, Annapolis, Maryland; the USS North Carolina, Wilmington, North Carolina and the U.S. Navy Museum, Washington, D.C.
- The Bullwacker, for the city of Helena, Montana, 1976.
- Trophies for the Brave, Canton Museum of Art, Canton, Ohio.

== Legacy ==
On March 28, 2010, Weaver's 90th birthday, the House of Representatives and Senate both stopped proceedings to give the sculptor a standing ovation as well as singing happy birthday.

== Gallery ==
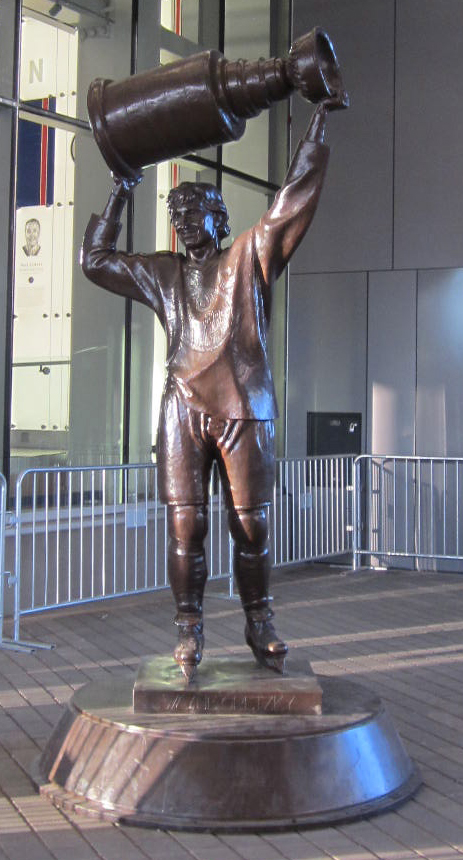
Statue located in Edmonton, of Wayne Gretzky hoisting the Stanley Cup.

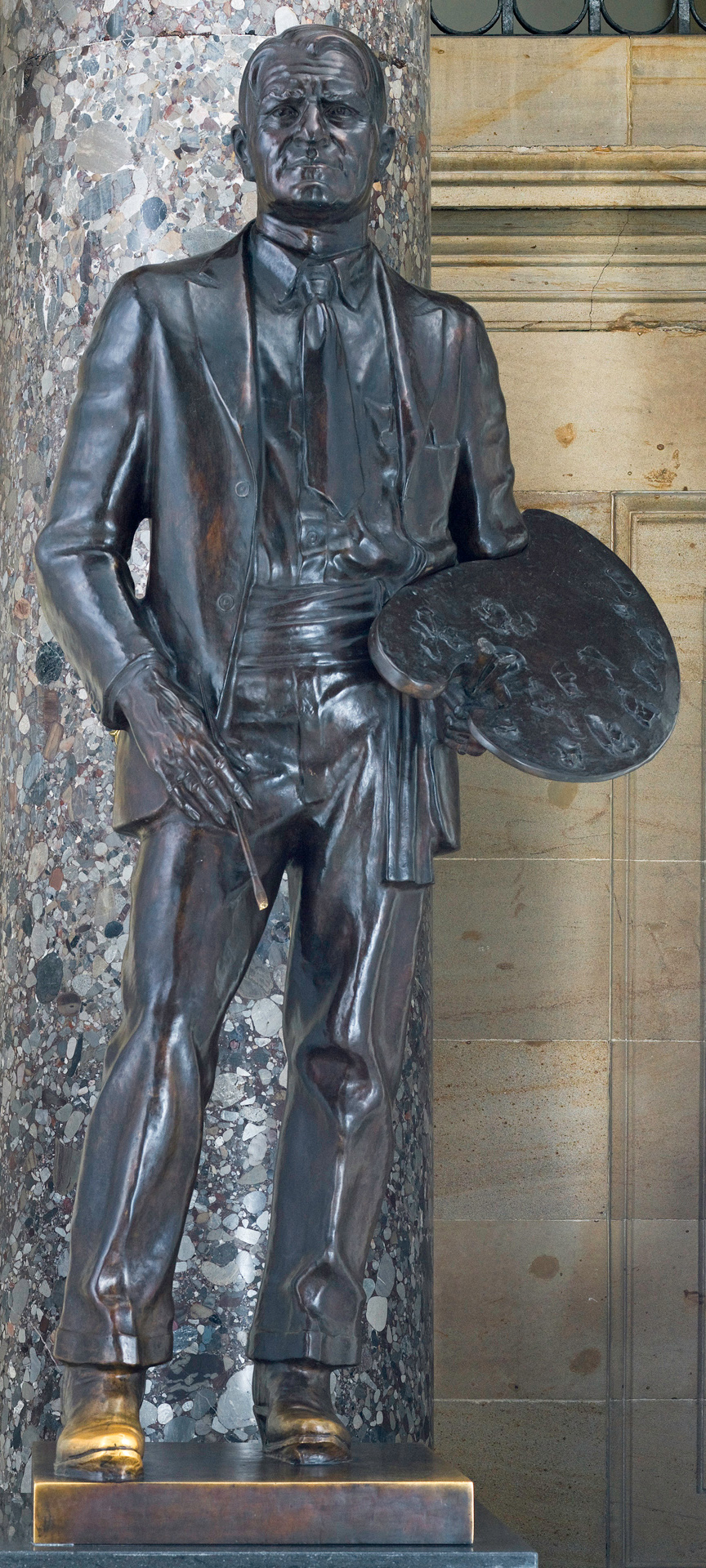
Charles Marion Russell, National Statuary Hall Collection

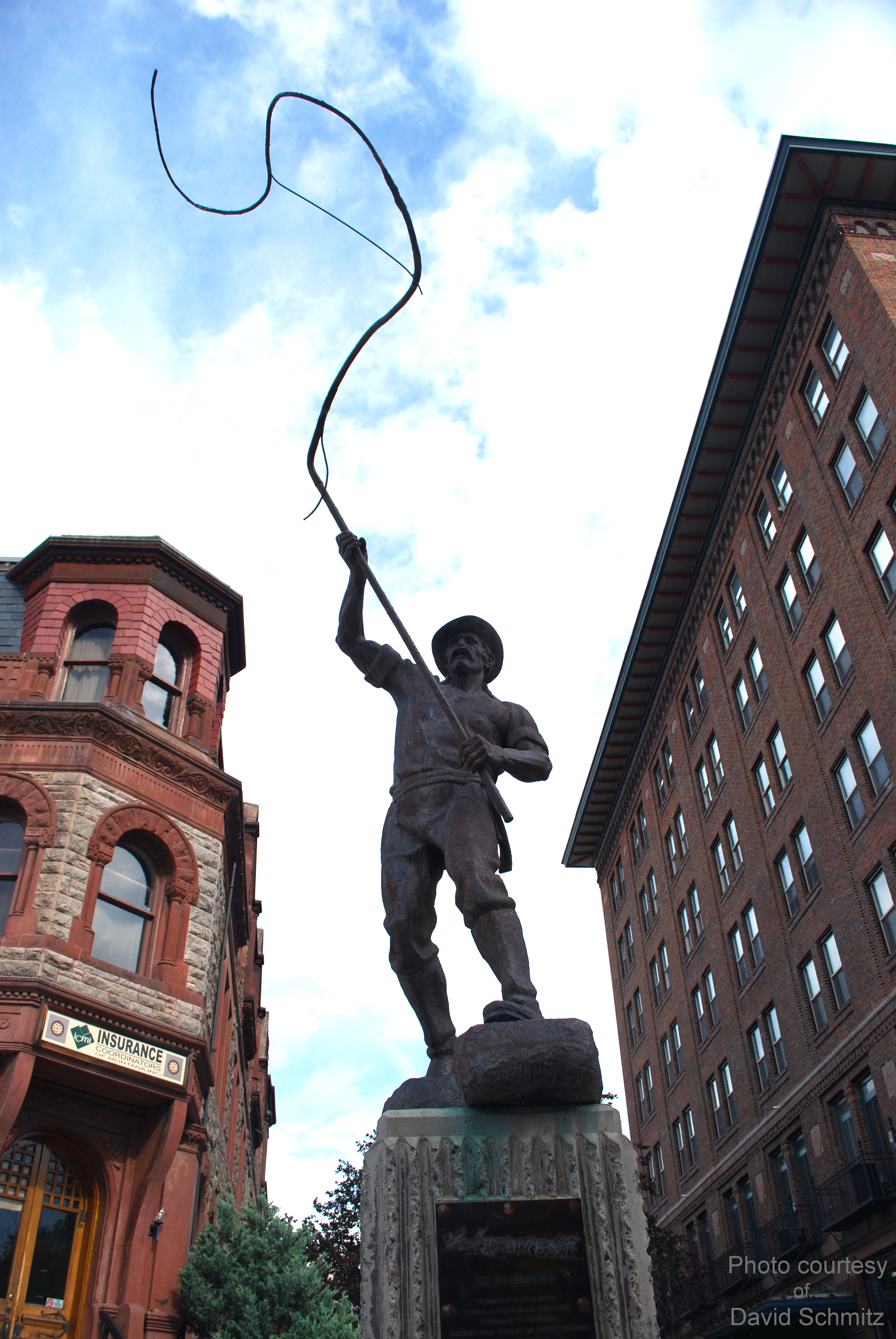
The Bullwacker in Helena, Montana

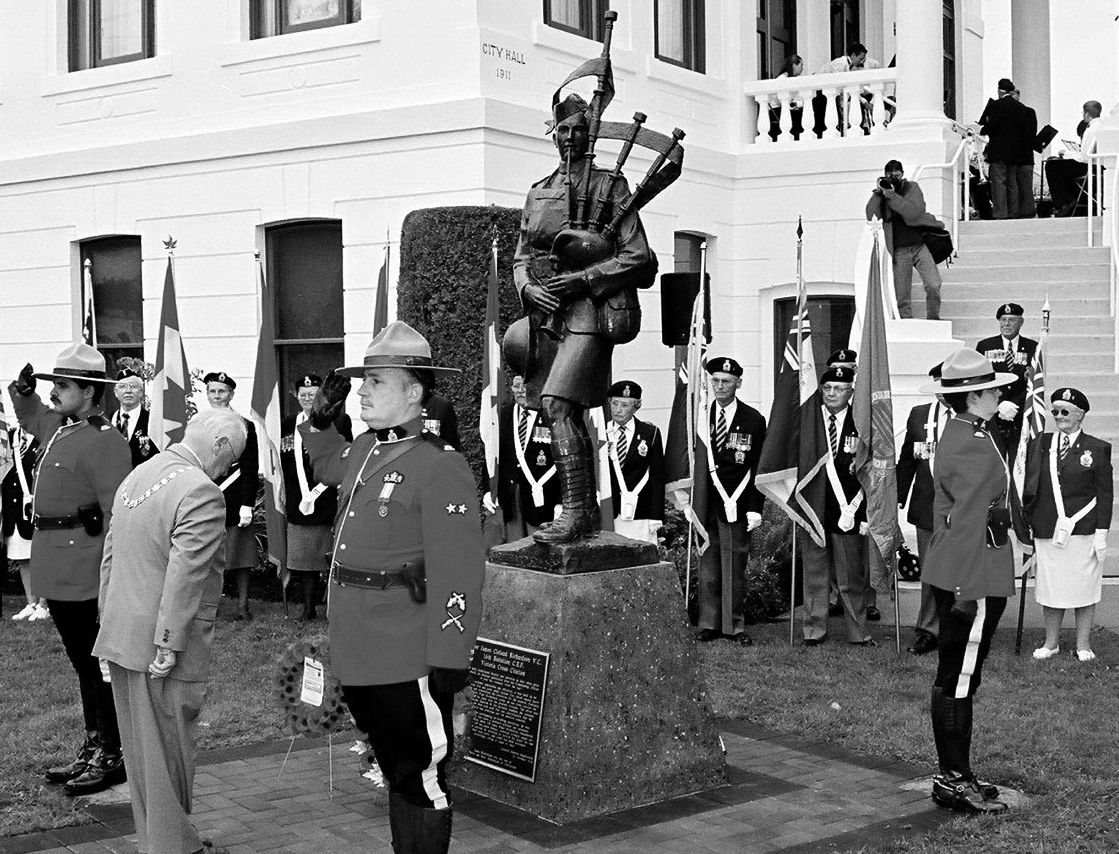
Piper Richardson statue in Chilliwack, BC.

== Bibliography ==
- epl.ca
