= Scottish tenor drum =

Scottish membranophone similar to tenor drums

Example of a Scottish Tenor Drum

The Scottish tenor drum is a musical instrument used within Scottish pipe bands. It is a double-headed membranophone that is held vertically with one head up, one head down, and played with soft mallets on the top head only. Common sizes of drums are 15, 16, 18, or 20 inch in diameter, with 12, 14, or 16 inch depth. The playing style of the Scottish tenor drum has varied throughout the years, but there is typically a variation of the combination of swings (or flourishes) and rhythmic accompaniment to the Scottish snare drum and the Great Highland Bagpipes. It is similar to the more common marching band style tenor drum.

== Within Competition ==
During band competitions, under most pipe band organizations, a pipe band is required to have at least one tenor drummer competing with the band. Many bands use between 3 and 7 tenor drummers to create variety in the music.

During solo competitions, a tenor drummer plays a set that is often either written by themselves, or their instructor. There is no standard to the type of music that is written for the tenor drum, although common styles exist for each region where competitions are held. Most pipe band organizations worldwide require that a solo tenor drummer have both a Great Highland bagpipe player, and a Scottish snare drummer as accompaniment. Commonly within a competition a tenor drummer would play either a hornpipe and jig set, or a march, strathspey, and reel set. However, the selection also depends on what the competition asks of the competitor to play.

== Tone ==
The tone of the tenor drum is similar to a bass drum, however it is often higher pitched. Often pipe bands will tune the tenor drums to play different pitches, allowing for more melodic and harmonic accompaniment to the band. The drums are tuned to the drones of the Great Highland bagpipes, and also notes on the chanter (commonly A, E, C chord). Although both heads of the drum are tensioned and tuned equally (to avoid the drum producing overtones when struck), a player only strikes the top head with the mallet.

== Swings ==
Although not used by all bands, swings are becoming increasingly popular. Tenor drummers using swings are often referred to as 'flourishing tenors.' Swings are done by tying a string to the end of the drum stick, and the fingers of the players. Then the player can "drop" the drumstick without losing it, and swing it around in a controlled manner. Many flourishing tenor drummers create choreographed sequences within a line of drummers, creating different effects while using the same basic swings. Currently whether tenor drummers should or should not flourish, or how much they should flourish, is a large area of debate.

== Rhythm ==
The music being played by the tenors often varies greatly between different regions and styles. Some tenors only play rhythm rather than flourishing, either as accent to the bass drum or snare drums, or to create intricate runs that add variation to the band's music. The bands that use tonally tuned tenor drummers also split the music for the tenor drummers, such that one player only plays certain notes, causing a melody to occur within the tenor line. This melody is used to provide a more full sound to the pipe corps or to provide harmonic accompaniment. Although more difficult rhythms are becoming popular among competitive pipe bands and competitive solo tenor drummers, the idea of a basic rhythmic accompaniment from the bass section is still the more popular ideal.

== See also ==
- Tenor drum
- Marching percussion
