= Adanac Military Cemetery =

CWGC cemetery in Somme, France

Adanac Military Cemetery, Miraumont
- Commonwealth War Graves Commission
- Used for those deceased 1914-1918
- Location: 50°4′27″N 2°44′40″E near Courcelette, France
- Total burials: 3186
- Unknowns: 1708
- Commemorated: 13

Adanac Military Cemetery is a Commonwealth War Graves Commission burial ground for the dead of World War I located near the French villages of Miraumont, Pys and Courcelette and contains 3,187 interments, 1483 of whom are identified.

The cemetery was formed after the war ended from the consolidation of existing burial sites into a 'concentration cemetery' by consolidating several smaller cemeteries onto the site.

The name 'Adanac' is a reversal of word Canada, the home of over five hundred of the men interred there. The name was necessary because a cemetery near Cambrai that had been established during the war in October 1918 had already received the name "Canada Cemetery".

== History ==
The cemetery sits on land that was wrested from the Germans by the Canadian Corps in October and November 1916 during the final phases of the Battles of the Somme. Most of the men buried at Adanac are British and Canadian soldiers who fell between September and November 1916 in the fields north of the village of Courcelette.

Following the Somme, the British occupied the nearby villages of Miraumont and Pys on 24–25 February 1917 after the German withdrawal to the Hindenburg Line. The Germans reoccupied the area on 25 March 1918 at the beginning of the Spring Offensive until the British recaptured it on 24 August 1918 during the Second Battle of the Somme.

There are also a smaller number of British and New Zealand soldiers killed in fighting in the Hundred Days Offensive of 1918 buried in the cemetery as well that came from this later phase of fighting in the area.

Sir Herbert Baker designed the cemetery. It contains the burials from the battlefields around Courcelette and the relocated graves from smaller cemeteries surrounding Miraumont, including:

- Pys British Cemetery [22 Canadian soldiers, 2 from the United Kingdom, 5 unknown]
- Pys New British Cemetery [35 war dead from the United Kingdom, 1 from New Zealand]
- Aqueduct Road Cemetery [11 soldiers from the United Kingdom]
- New Zealand Cemetery, Grevillers [19 soldiers from New Zealand]
- Shrine Cemetery, Grevillers [13 soldiers from New Zealand, 2 from the United Kingdom]

== Notable burials ==
- Serjeant Samuel Forsyth (1891–1918), a New Zealand recipient of the Victoria Cross is buried in Plot I Row I Grave 39. Forsyth earned the VC for valourous actions while serving with the No.3 Field Company, New Zealand Engineers on 24 August 1918 in the fighting during the Second Battle of Bapaume and died in the fighting later that day. Forsyth had been previously interred at the aforementioned New Zealand Cemetery at Grevillers before its concentration into Adanac.
- Piper James Cleland Richardson (1895–1916), a Scottish-Canadian Victoria Cross recipient is buried in Plot III, Row F, Grave 36. Richardson earned the VC serving with the Canadian Corps' 16th Infantry Battalion during the Battle of the Ancre Heights on the 8th of October, 1916 and was killed the same day.
- Under-age soldiers:
  - Joseph Lorne Dewart, 16 years old (Grave Reference: Plot I Row D Grave 39)
  - Russell Lewis Collingridge, 16 years old (Gr. Ref.: VI.C.3)
  - Thomas Ethelbert Tombs, 16 years old (Gr. Ref.: IV.H.9)
  - Thomas Flannigan, 17 years old (Gr. Ref.: VIII.G.36)
  - Joshua Watts, 17 years old (Gr. Ref.: VIII.E.10)
