= Statue of Charles Marion Russell =

Statue by John Weaver

Charles Marion Russell
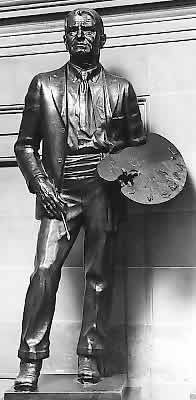
- Sculpture in the National Statuary Hall Collection
- Artist: John Weaver
- Subject: Charles Marion Russell
- Location: Helena, Montana; Washington, D.C., United States

Charles Marion Russell is a sculpture depicting the American artist of the same name by John Weaver.

One version, a bronze, is installed in the United States Capitol's National Statuary Hall, in Washington, D.C., as part of the National Statuary Hall Collection. The statue was gifted by the U.S. state of Montana in 1959.

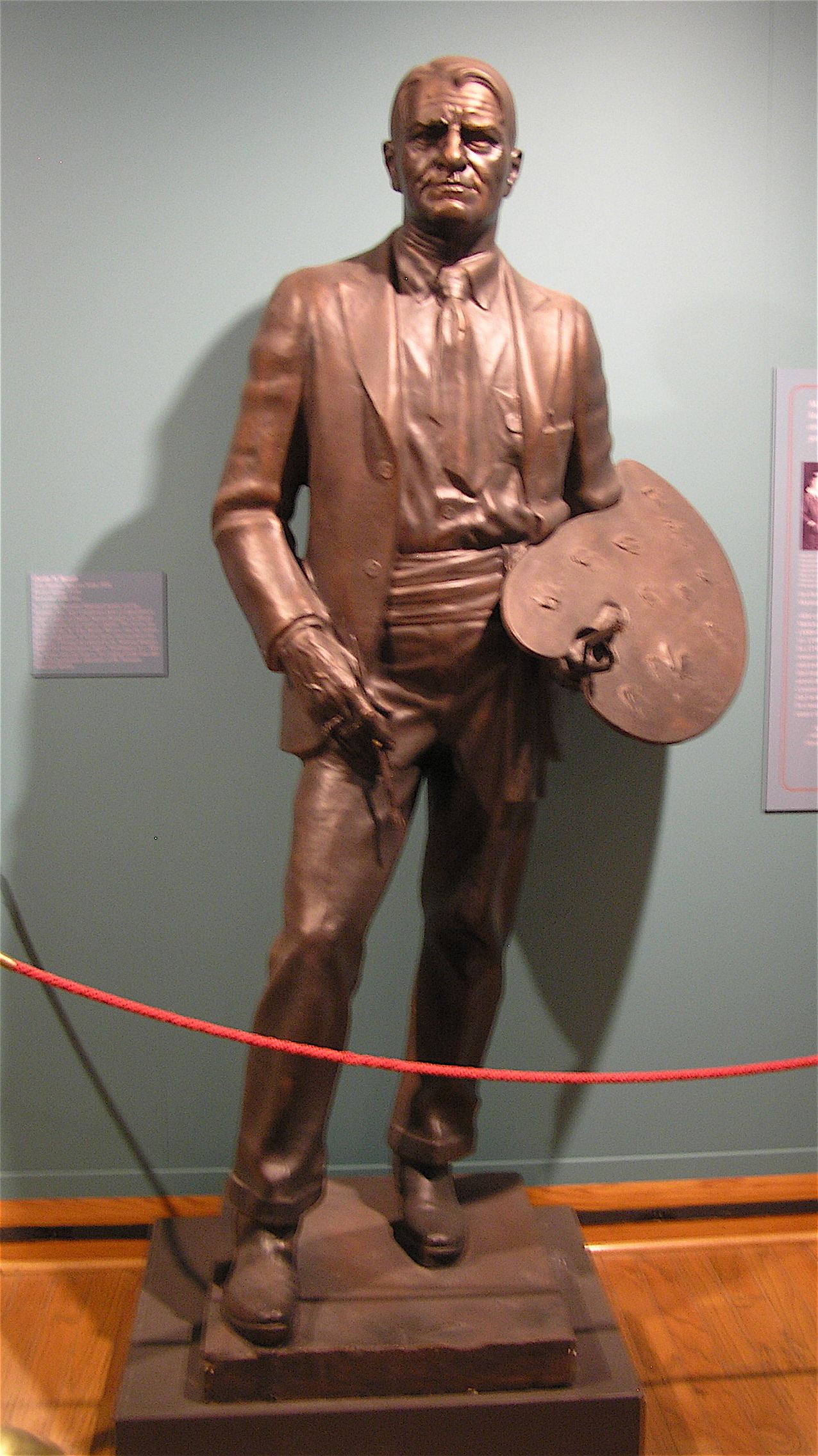
Version in the Montana Historical Society's MacKay Collection, in Helena, Montana

Another version is installed in the Montana Historical Society's MacKay Collection, in Helena, Montana.
