= Pipe band =

Class of musical ensembles usually in Scotland

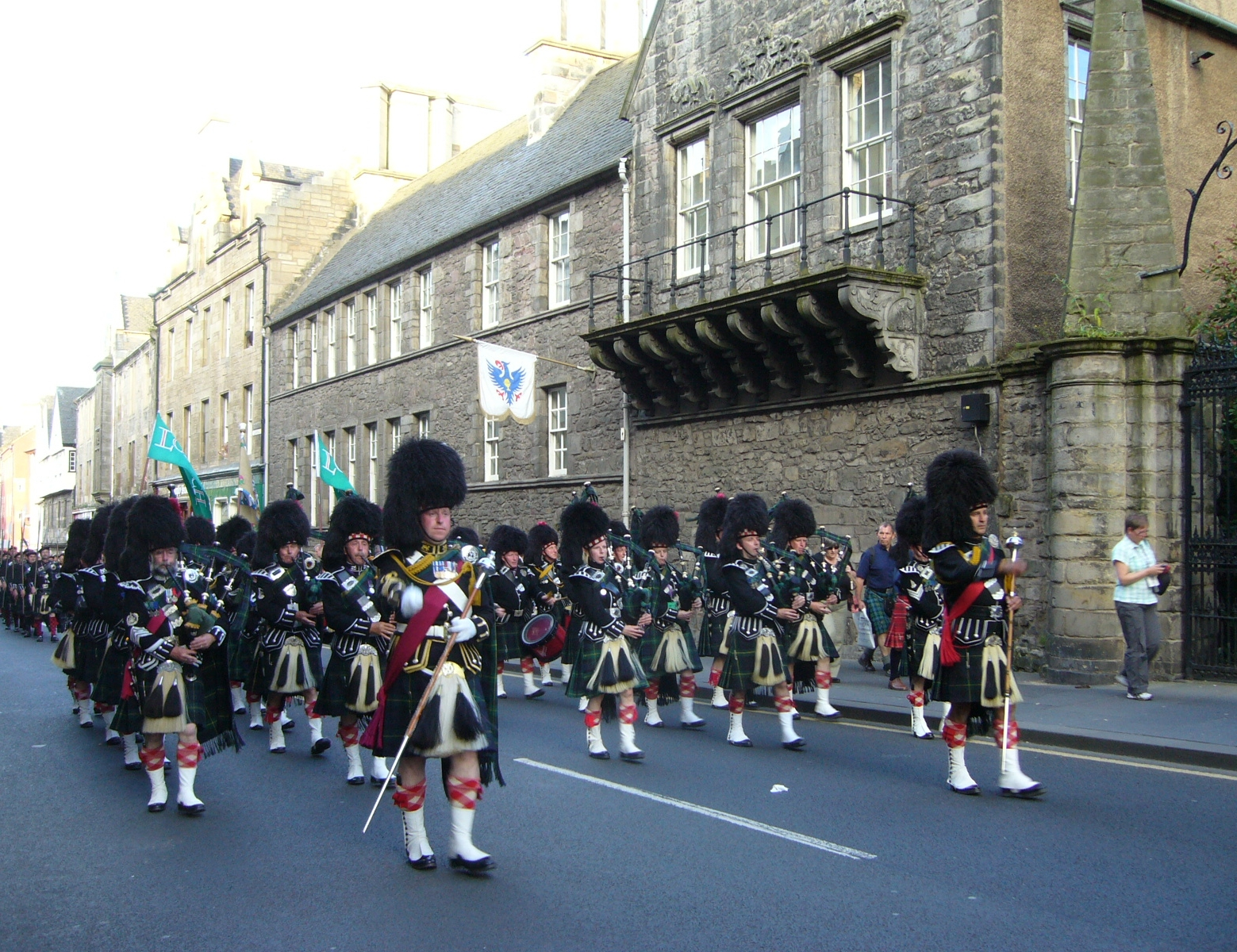
Lonach Pipe band, Edinburgh, Scotland, 2009

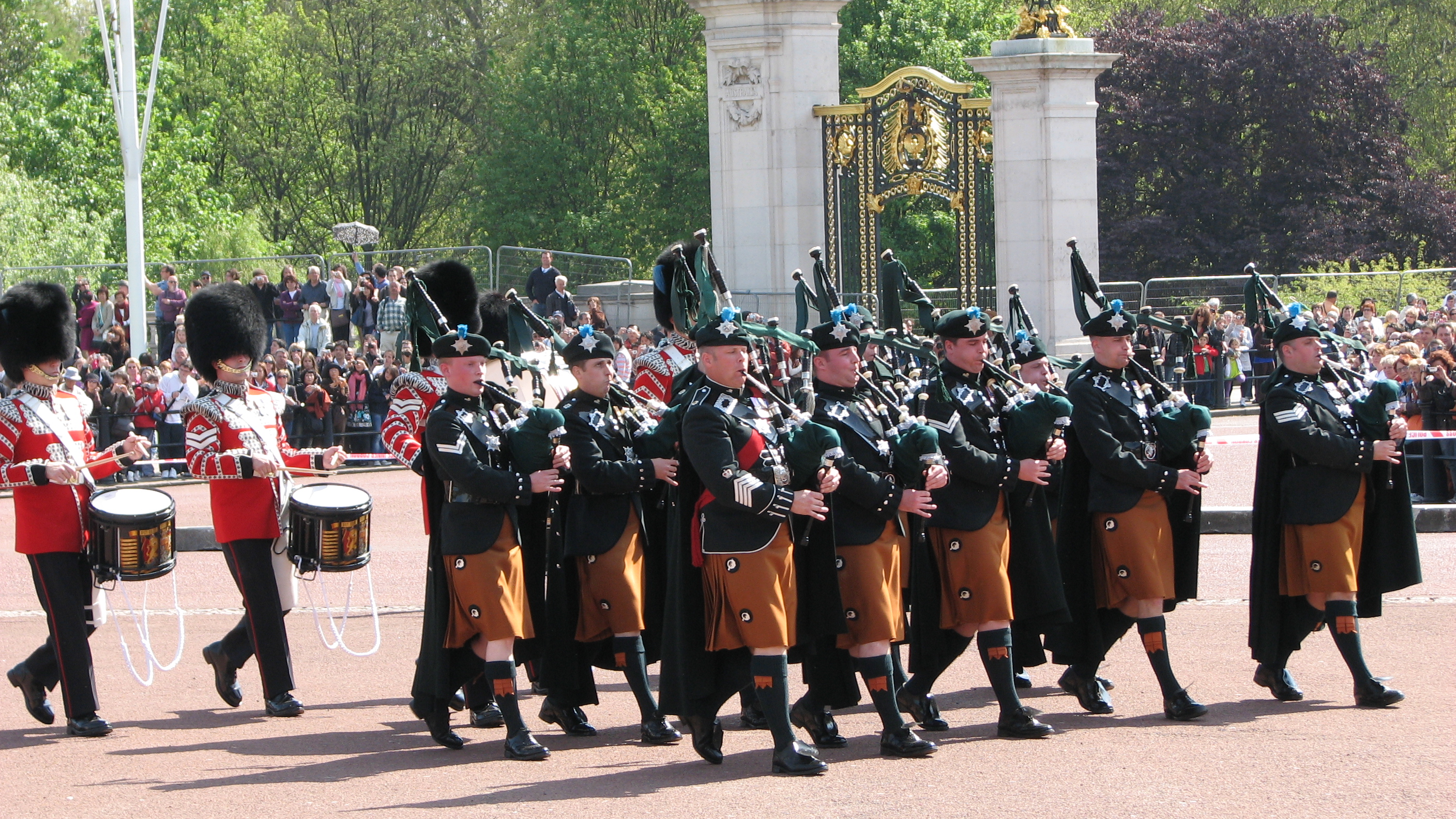
Pipes and Drums of the Irish Guards, 2009.

Scotland the Brave - United States Air Force Pipe Band

A pipe band is a musical ensemble consisting of pipers and drummers. The term pipes and drums, used by military pipe bands, is also common.

The most common form of pipe band consists of a section of pipers playing the Great Highland bagpipe, a section of snare drummers (often referred to as 'side drummers'), several tenor drummers and usually one, though occasionally two, bass drummers. The tenor drummers and bass drummer are referred to collectively as the 'bass section' (or in North America as the 'midsection'), and the entire drum section is collectively known as the drum corps. The band follows the direction of the pipe major; when on parade the band may be led by a drum major, who directs the band with a mace. Standard instrumentation for a pipe band involves 6 to 25 pipers, 3 to 10 side drummers, 1 to 6 tenor drummers and 1 bass drummer. Occasionally this instrumentation is augmented to include additional instruments (such as additional percussion instruments or keyboard instruments), but this is typically done only in concert settings.

Pipe bands started in Scottish Regiments of the British Army, in the nineteenth century. The tradition then spread to former British colonies such as Canada, Australia, New Zealand, and the United States, as well as constituents of the Commonwealth of Nations. In addition, a number of other countries have adopted the tradition, notably in areas with Celtic roots: Ireland (circa 1900), Brittany in Northwestern France (1940s), and the regions of Galicia, Asturias and Cantabria in Northern Spain.

== History ==
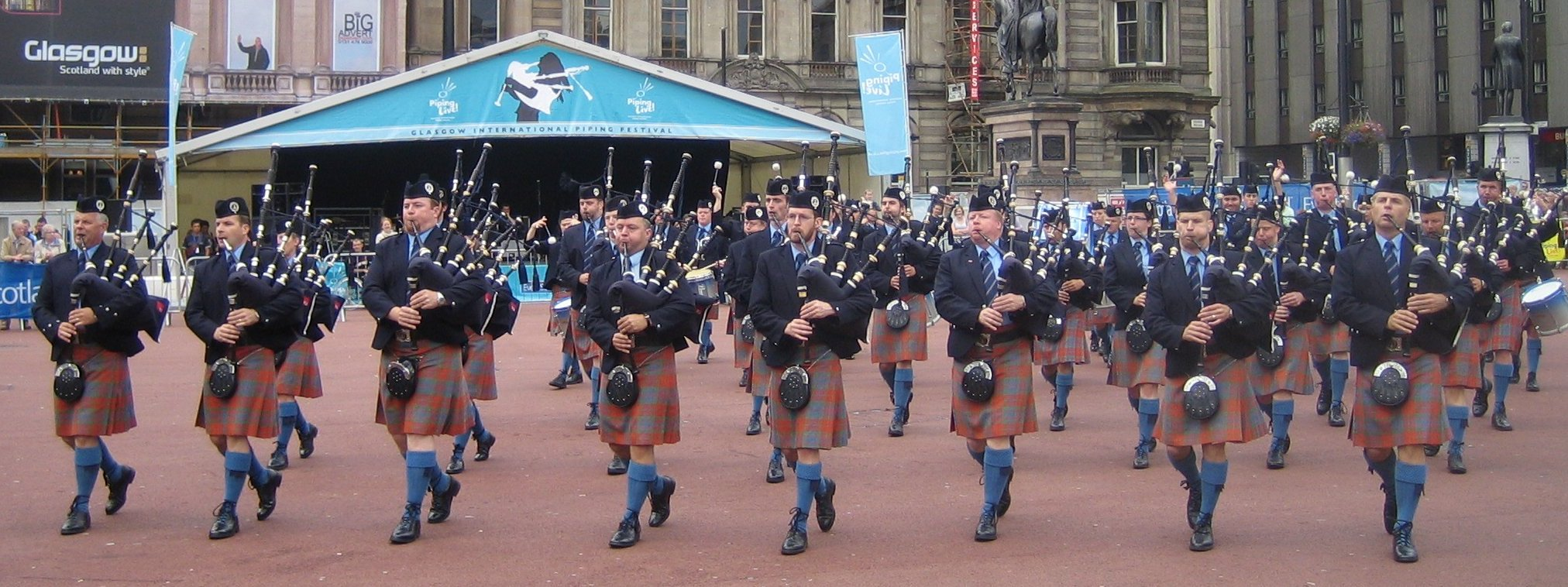
Canada's Simon Fraser University Pipe Band, winner of six World Pipe Band Championships, performing in George Square, Glasgow

The pipe band's origins are in the military, but are obscure as contemporary historical regimental records had no direct interest in piping, giving only hints at details. The Royal Scottish Pipe Band Association maintains that the origin of military pipe bands are traced back to the early 1800s as soldiers tasked with keeping pace and morale on long marches with their respective regiments. The global spread of piping can also be directly attributed with British colonial expansion. Pipers and drummers in the employ of the British Army and Scottish emigrants brought with them traditional music and the culture surrounding the practice.

It is known that pipers served in regiments from the earliest times; the Royal Scots have records referring to pipers dating back to the early seventeenth century. During this time, soldiers specially employed as pipers were employed by the officers of the regiments as private pipers, although countless others were certainly trained in piping while serving. This situation continued until the 1840s, when Queen Victoria's enthusiasm for all things Highland was instrumental in the War Office's decision that each battalion of the Highland regiments be allowed five pipers and a pipe major, which continues to be all that the British Army provides funds for to this day. Any additional pipers in the battalion pipe band were and are equipped today by funds from the officers' mess fund of the battalion.

By this time, pipers were already playing together with drummers, probably modelling themselves on the fife and drum bands which had existed in Switzerland since the 15th century. Drumming itself is as ancient as the concept of formed military units, and their original purpose on the battlefield was to signal tactical movements and keep cadence on the march.

By the time World War I broke out, the pipe band represented a popular image of Scotland, both internally and externally. Military pipers were killed and injured in significant numbers in the Great War, before the practice of playing in the trenches was banned. The ban was often not observed; Canadian piper James Richardson was awarded the Victoria Cross for playing in action in 1916. Pipes have occasionally played into battle, notably at El Alamein, Dieppe, the Normandy beaches, and the crossing of the Rhine. The Calgary Highlanders went into action for the first time at Hill 67 in Normandy with company pipers playing; it was the only time the Regiment did so. Military pipers have also served in both Gulf Wars.

== Military pipes and drums ==
Pipe bands have long been part of military tradition, most notably in the United Kingdom and its former colonies. Many of the same standard tunes are found in both the military and civilian pipe band repertoires, and many similarities exist in terms of musical style, historical and musical influences, and dress and deportment.

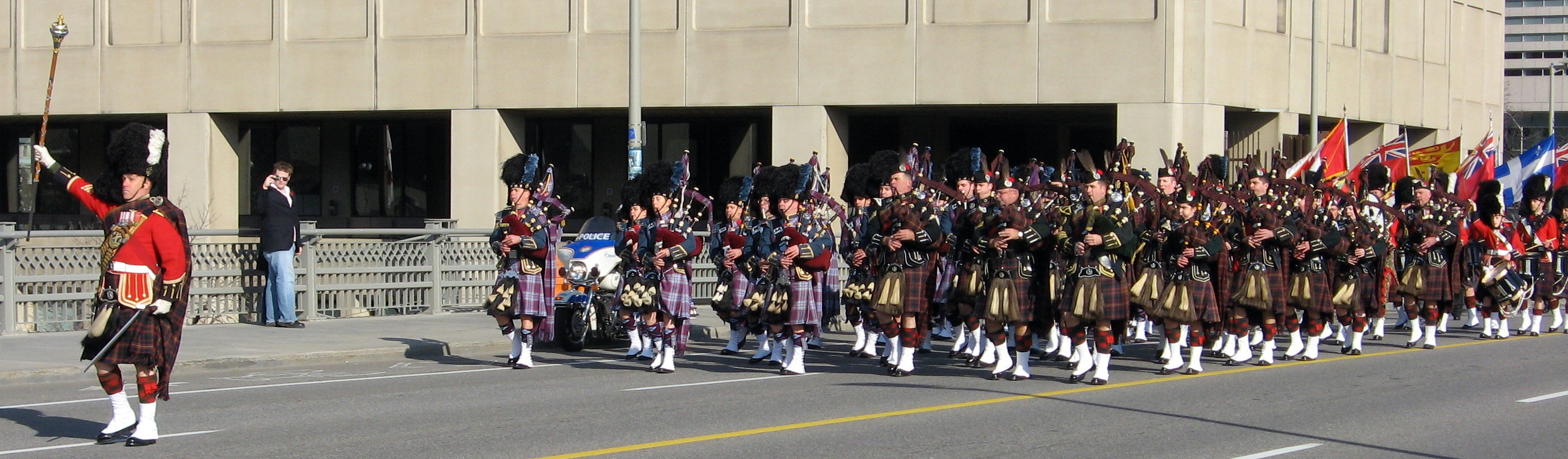
A military Remembrance Day parade in Ottawa, Ontario.

Military bandsmen as full time musicians in British Army bands are normally required to take on a secondary role in the battlefield as medics. However, in most cases, soldiers in the pipes and drums in a Scottish or Irish infantry regiment are fully trained infantrymen who constitute a machine gun or mortar platoon, or are Assault Pioneers or as a rifle platoon. (This is similar to corps of drums in an English or Welsh infantry regiment although their tradition of fifes and drums is quite separate from that of the Highland bagpipes). As a result, in addition to being musicians, members of the pipes and drums must also be qualified fighting soldiers. Unlike musicians, who belong to the Royal Corps of Army Music, the pipers and drummers belong to the regiment in which they serve and are combat soldiers first and foremost. Pipers in particular uphold a centuries-old tradition of inspiring soldiers in the field and this can be traced back into Scotland's clan system to the 16th century at least.

In other parts of the world, military pipe bands are generally part of reserve regiments, and also draw civilian members into their ranks.

The British Army runs its own pipes and drums training facility, the Army School of Bagpipe Music and Highland Drumming, in Edinburgh, Scotland. To be qualified as a pipe major or drum major in the pipes and drums of a regiment of the British Army, candidates must successfully pass a series of courses at the school.

== Music ==
The City of Auckland Pipe Band playing Amazing Grace during the festival interceltique de Lorient in 2016.

The music played by pipe bands generally consists of music from the Scottish tradition, the Irish tradition and the Breton tradition, either in the form of traditional folk tunes and dances or popular music that has been adapted for pipes. Examples of typical pipe bands forms include marches, slow airs, jigs and reels, and strathspeys. In recent years there has been a great deal of emphasis placed on new forms, especially the suite. A good example of a suite for pipe band is Don Thompson's composition Journey to Skye (1987).

In conventional pipe band music, each section of instruments has a different role in the music. Generally speaking, the pipers deliver the melodic and harmonic material, while the side drummers provide a rhythmically interactive accompaniment part. The tenor drummers provide rhythmic pulses and the bass drummer anchors the rhythms, providing a strong and steady beat.

=== Pipe section ===
The bagpipers are responsible for providing all melodic material in the music. Generally speaking, all of the pipers play a unison melody on their chanters, with their drones providing the harmonic support and filling out the sound.

When harmony is written within the pipe section, it is usually a two-part harmony, and is usually scored in a 2:1 ratio (with two-thirds of the players on the melody and one third of the players on the harmony part). Because of the limited range of the chanter, the harmonic possibilities are somewhat limited, but well-written harmony in a pipe band setting can be extremely effective. Pipe band harmony is sometimes referred to as 'seconds', although this simply refers to a second part and not to the interval of a second. In fact, intervals of a second are rarely found in pipe band harmony parts, except in passing. Instead, it is the consonant intervals which are stressed, such as perfect fourths and fifths, and even more commonly, parallel thirds and sixths.

In contemporary arrangements, a merge between harmony and melody known as 'counter-melody' has been aired. A counter-melody is similar to a harmony part, but is distinguished because it has a melodic line of its own. Counter-melody can take a completely different thematic approach and can dramatically change the flow and atmosphere of the melodic unison. This technique is relatively new in the pipe band circuit, and in most cases require skill and timing to achieve in full unison.

=== Drum corps ===
The drum corps of a pipe band consists of a section of drummers playing highland snare drums and the bass section. In the early days of pipe bands, rope tension snare drums were common, but as bagpipe tuning pitches became higher, a brighter tone was demanded from the drum corps. Pipe band drummers now play on drums with very tight, knitted kevlar heads, designed for maximum tension to create a very crisp and strident sound. Since today's drum is so facile as a result of its design, players are often able to execute extremely complicated and technically demanding rudimentary patterns.

The pipe band drum corps is responsible for both supporting the piping with a solid rhythmic foundation and sense of pulse, often creating an interesting contrapuntal line unto itself. The line played by the drum corps (referred to as the 'drum score') is usually based on rudimentary patterns and can often be quite involved, with solo, unison and contrapuntal passages throughout. A popular pattern in many scores is for the lead drummer to play a phrase, and the section to play in response. This technique is known as seconds (sometimes referred to as chips, or forte). The drum corps is also responsible for the dynamics of the band. Given that the bagpipes are at a constant volume, it is the drum corps which adds dynamic effect to the ensemble by varying the weight of playing and the number of players playing at any given time.

While standard practice in pipe bands is for the pipe section to perform the traditional or standard arrangements of the melodies, including gracenotes, drum scores are very often composed by the lead drummer of the band.

==== Bass section ====
The bass section (also referred to as a midsection) consists of a section of tenor drummers and a bass drummer. Their role is to provide rhythmic support to the entire ensemble. In this respect, the bass section allows the drum corps to delegate their timekeeping responsibilities and allows more freedom in the drum scores.

Generally, the bass drum provides a steady pulse, playing on the downbeat and on the strong beats of the bar, and the tenors support that pulse, often adding supporting beats, accents and dynamic interest.

Tenor drums in their modern form are a relatively new addition to the pipe band. While pipe bands of the past would often include tenor drummers, they would usually be "swinging tenors", players who would swing their sticks for elaborate visual effect but who would rarely play. They are more known as flourishing tenors. Today's tenor drummers play pitched drums, and careful thought is given as to which pitches to use and at which times. The pitches help provide melodic or harmonic accompaniment to the bagpipes; creating a more dynamic flow between the drum corps and the pipe corps. In some cases, five or six tenor drummers have been used, providing a palette of individual pitches for use in a variety of musical situations. The swinging also known as flourishing has developed somewhat into an art form, with drummers playing and swinging in unison or sequential flows. Tenor drums are also still commonly played on a soft harness, or sling, instead of the typical marching harness used by the snare drums, but shoulder harness tenors are now used by several pipe bands.

=== Band Numbers ===
Competing bands must adhere to minimum numbers requirements. Typically, a band must consist of a minimum of 6 pipers, 2 snare drummers, and 1 bass drummer with numbers varying slightly for different grades (see more on grades below).

== Uniform ==
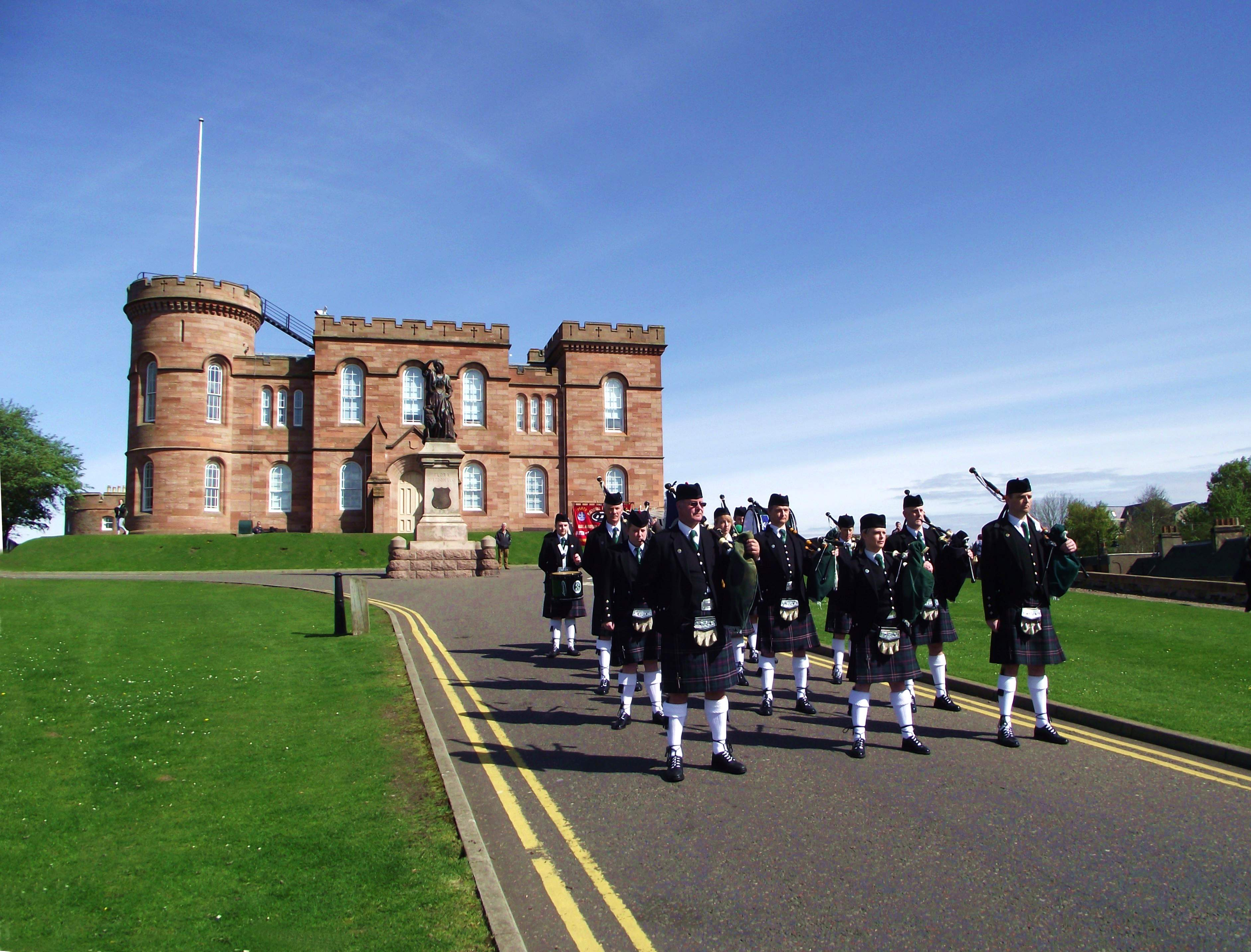
Pipe band at Inverness Castle

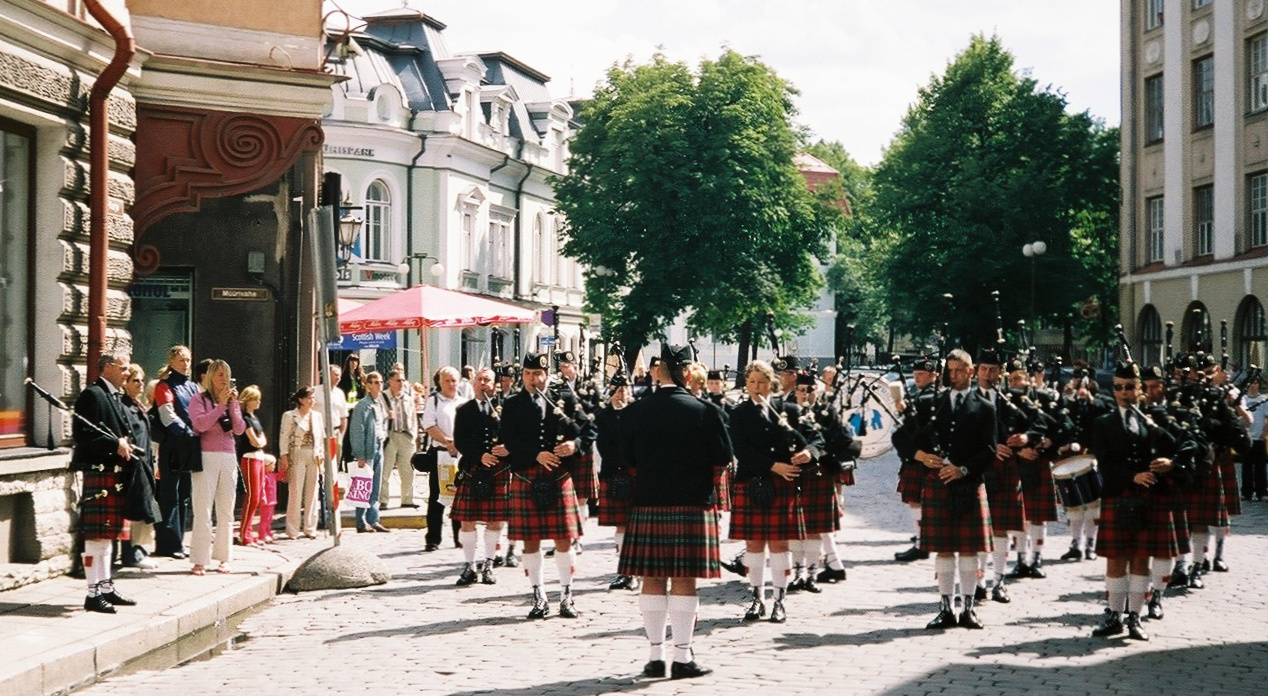
Pipe band during the 2004 Scottish Week in Tallinn, Estonia

Pipe band uniforms vary from band to band. However, the typical uniform consists of a glengarry (cap), shirt, tie, waistcoat (vest), jacket, kilt, hose and ghillie brogues. Many pipe bands wear a tartan that may reflect the area the band originated from or the history of the band. Jackets and waistcoats are usually black, and shirts are often short-sleeved for comfort. Each band also has its own tie, which can match the kilt tartan, or is sometimes merely a block colour. In competition, appearing smart in uniform is essential; some competitions have dress codes, for instance certain types of jackets only, ties must be knotted at the collar and so on.

Pipe bands often vary the uniform worn, depending on the formality of the occasion. Very formal occasions require jackets to be worn, whereas less formal occasions do not, and only the waistcoat is worn. On semi-formal occasions, the jacket is not worn, but a long-sleeved shirt is worn under the waistcoat. This increases the formality of the outfit, but decreases the comfort. On occasion, no waistcoat is worn, in which case the shirt sleeve must be of long length.

Pipe Major uniforms are usually different, to distinguish them from the other members of the band. More traditional highland dress may be worn, sometimes with a feather bonnet.

== Competition ==
Competition is a primary focus for many pipe bands throughout the world. Every year, mainly in the period from spring to autumn, pipe bands around the world compete against each other at various venues, often at Highland festivals. For many, this usually culminates in the World Pipe Band Championships, held on the 2nd weekend of August. A typical season for many competing pipe bands might include ten or more of these competitions. Europe (especially the UK and Ireland), North America, Australia, and New Zealand have active competitive pipe band communities, but there are competing bands from throughout the world.

Since 1930, when the Scottish band association (today known as the Royal Scottish Pipe Band Association or RSPBA) was formed, there has been a World Pipe Band Championship competition, known as 'The Worlds' held annually in Glasgow during August. For competitive bands, the title of World Champion is highly coveted, and this event is seen as the culmination of a year's worth of preparation, rehearsal and practice.

Traditionally, the entirety of the World Championships had taken place on one day in August, on Glasgow Green. However, in more recent years, the competition has been spread over Friday and Saturday, with Friday hosting a qualifying event for the Grade 1 final. Typically, several hundred bands attend across the two days, traveling from all over the world. Bands arrive early and, in most grades, are required to perform in a qualifying round which takes place in the morning. The top bands at the end of the qualifying round play in a second event in the afternoon to determine an aggregate winner.

To win, Grade One bands must perform in two events, a March, Strathspey & Reel event (known as a "set" or "MSR") which consists of three pre-arranged tunes, and a Medley event, which consists of a short selection of music chosen and arranged by the band. The rules for the medley contest are very open, requiring only a minimum and maximum time frame (between 5:30 and 7 minutes) and a minimum of different time signatures that must be played as well as two 3 pace rolls played at the beginning of the tune (also known as an attack).

In addition to performing at 'The Worlds', most internationally competitive bands participate in a season of events that are generally held during Scotland's summer months. While events of this type are usually held at Highland Games, band competitions in Scotland, Ireland and Northern Ireland are often large enough to be held as events unto themselves. The grading and organization of these events is generally consistent with the World Championships and the events are typically administered by the governing Pipe Band Association.

In addition to the World Pipe Band Championships, the RSPBA also typically hosts four other major championships throughout the year. These are the Scottish, British, UK, and European Pipe Band Championships. Despite their naming, these events are not limited to entrants from the region after which they are named and it is common for bands from outside these regions to enter.

=== Grading system ===
Prizes at the Worlds are awarded in the following nine categories:

- Grade 1
- Grade 2
- Grade 3A
- Grade 3B
- Juvenile
- Grade 4A
- Grade 4B
- Novice Juvenile A
- Novice Juvenile B

In the Novice Juvenile and Juvenile categories, band members must be under the age of eighteen, with the exception of one "adult" player, often an instructor, who may serve as the Pipe Major or Pipe Sergeant. The remaining categories have no age restriction, and are instead based on proficiency. Grading and eligibility are overseen by the National Council and Music Board of the RSPBA, and bands can be downgraded or upgraded at the annual regrading, which takes place at the end of the competition season. A band can apply for downgrading, but will have to compete in two further contests in their existing grade.

Because of time constraints, the RSPBA uses "A" and "B" designations in Grade 3, 4, and Novice Juvenile for major competitions. In doing so, bands are grouped based on prior-years' performances, and can receive promotions within their respective grade. These vary slightly throughout the world. For example, in the Republic of Ireland and North America, Grade 4B is known as Grade 5, and in Australia and New Zealand there is no Novice grade at all.

== Non-competitive piping ==
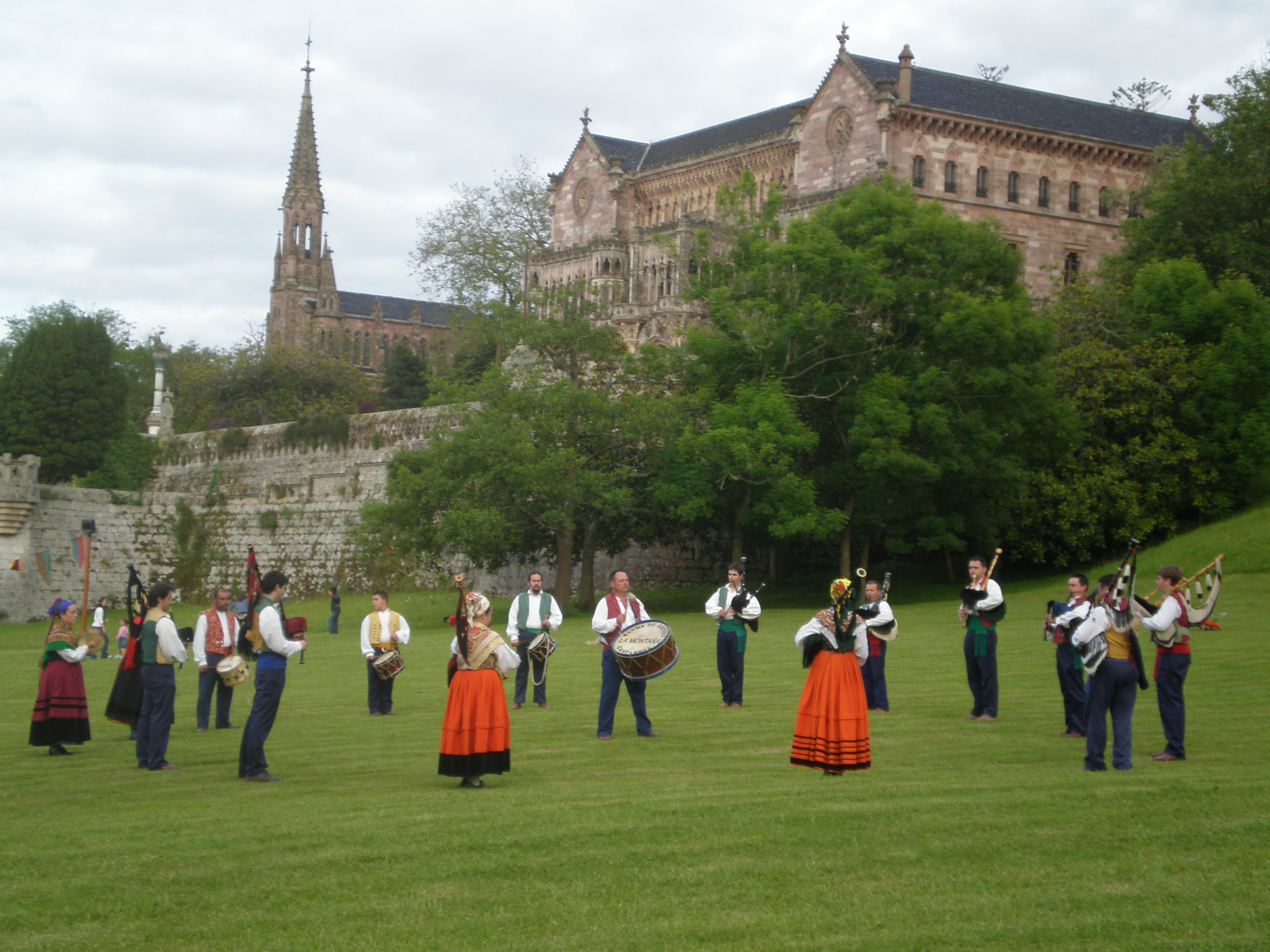
Traditional Cantabrian bagpipe band in Comillas, Cantabria.

Many pipe bands perform in parades and other public events as a primary activity. These bands are sometimes referred to as "street bands" or "parade bands". Some military bands fall into this category as well, playing for regimental functions in lieu of, or supplemented by, competitions and/or concerts.

In recent times, concert performances have become increasingly popular. The purely musical nature of these venues enable the exploration of non-traditional repertoire, and serves as another means by which piping and drumming can present itself to the public in a modern fashion.

== Bagad ==
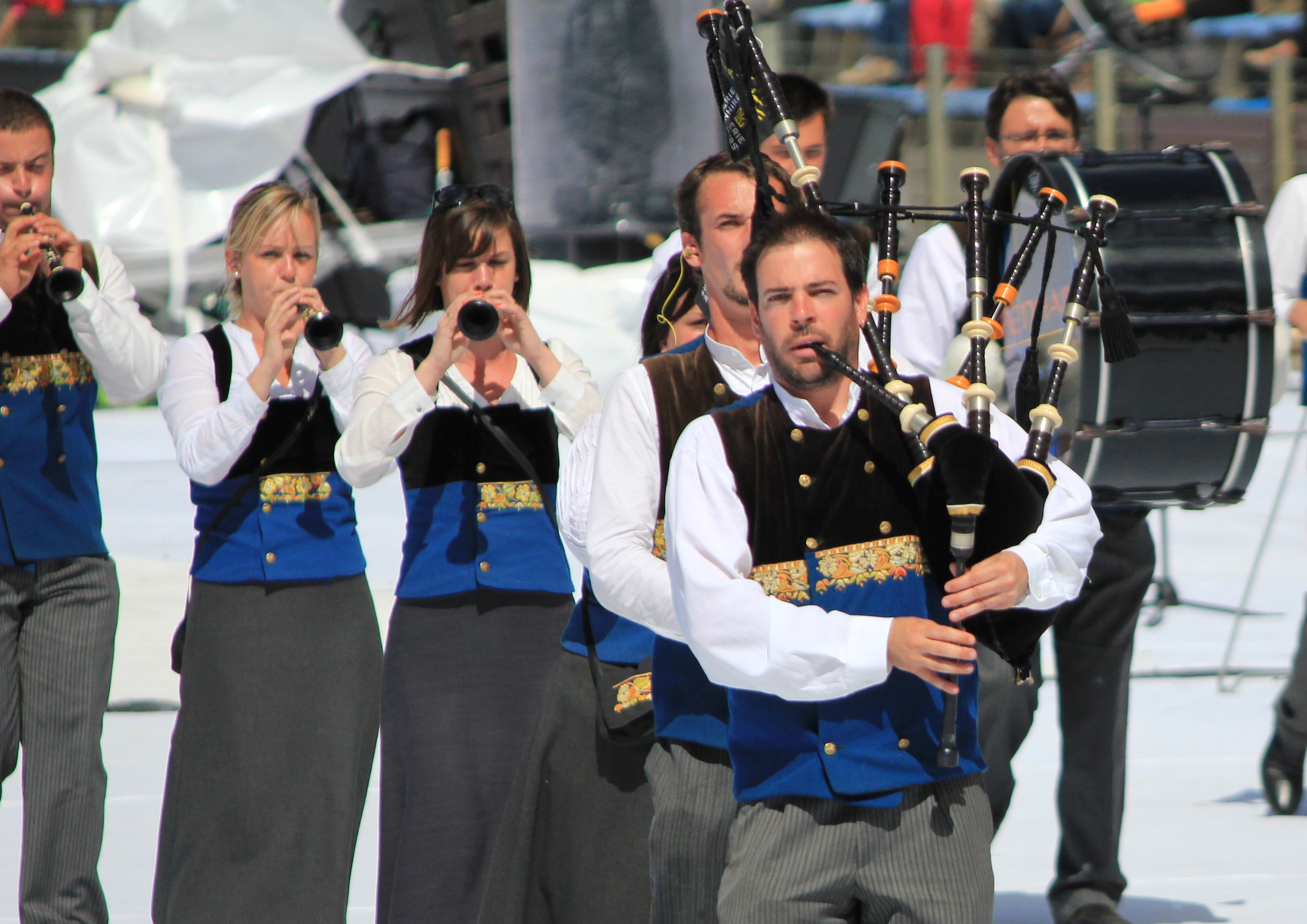
Bagad Penhars from Quimper, with bagpipes, bombardes, and drums.

A lesser-known type of pipe band that has already expanded the pipe band genre is the bagad, a Breton cultural phenomenon. Bagads began in the thirties to counter the widespread decay of the living Breton folk tradition.

A modern-day bagad consists of a biniou braz (Breton bagpipes), a bombarde section, a drum corps, and any additional musical instruments the band wishes to add. Common additions are clarinets, brass instruments (often trumpets or saxophones), guitars, and other forms of binious.

== See also ==
- List of pipe bands and associations
- Corps of drums, military formation music traditionally used by the rest of Europe
- Drum and bugle corps, military formation music traditionally used by the United States after the American Civil War
